= Figure skating at the 1932 Winter Olympics – Pairs =

Figure skating at the Olympics

Pairs at the III Olympic Winter Games
- Venue: Herb Brooks Arena
- Date: 12 February 1932
- Competitors: 14 from 4 nations

Medalists
1st place, gold medalist(s)		Andrée Joly / Pierre Brunet; France
2nd place, silver medalist(s)		Beatrix Loughran / Sherwin Badger; United States
3rd place, bronze medalist(s)		Emília Rotter / László Szollás; Hungary

The pair skating event was held as part of the figure skating at the 1932 Winter Olympics. It was the fifth appearance of the event, which had previously been held twice at the Summer Olympics in 1908 and 1920 and twice at the Winter Games in 1924 and 1928. The competition was held on Friday 12 February 1932. Fourteen figure skaters from four nations competed.

== Results ==
Andrée Brunet / Pierre Brunet successfully defended their 1928 title.

Rank	Name	Nation	Total points	Places
1	Andrée Brunet / Pierre Brunet	France	76.7	12
2	Beatrix Loughran / Sherwin Badger	United States	77.5	16
3	Emília Rotter / László Szollás	Hungary	76.4	20
4	Olga Orgonista / Sándor Szalay	Hungary	72.2	28
5	Constance Wilson-Samuel / Montgomery Wilson	Canada	69.6	35
6	Frances Claudet / Chauncey Bangs	Canada	68.9	36
7	Gertrude Meredith / Joseph Savage	United States	59.8	49

Referee:

- (United States) Joel B. Liberman

Judges:

- (Hungary) Jenő Minnich
- (Norway) Yngvar Bryn
- (Austria) Hans Grünauer
- (Finland) Walter Jakobsson
- (France) Georges Torchon
- (United Kingdom) Herbert J. Clarke
- (United States) Charles M. Rotch
