= List of Olympic medalists in figure skating =

Figure skating records and statistics

Medal records
- Olympic Games; World Championships; European Championships; Four Continents Championships; Grand Prix of Figure Skating; Other events
- Grand Slam; Junior Grand Slam; Golden Slam; Junior Golden Slam; Super Slam

Highest scores statistics
- Current senior; Current junior; Historical senior; Historical junior

Rankings (current and statistics)
- World Standings; Season's World Ranking

Figure skating has been part of the Olympic Games since 1908. There have been 301 medals (101 gold, 100 silver, and 100 bronze) awarded to figure skaters representing 30 National Olympic Committees over the span of 26 different Olympic Games. Six events have been contested; however, men's special figures, was discontinued after 1908. Medals are awarded in men's singles, women's singles, pair skating, ice dance, and the team event.

Canadian ice dancers Tessa Virtue and Scott Moir are the only figure skaters to win five Olympic medals (three gold and two silver). Gillis Grafström of Sweden, Evgeni Plushenko of Russia, and Yuma Kagiyama and Kaori Sakamoto, both of Japan, have each won four medals. The only skaters with three consecutive titles are Grafström in men's singles, Sonja Henie of Norway in women's singles, and Irina Rodnina of the Soviet Union in pair skating. Nathan Chen and Alysa Liu, both of the United States, as well as Tessa Virtue and Scott Moir, are the only skaters to win two gold medals at the same Olympics.

== Medalists ==
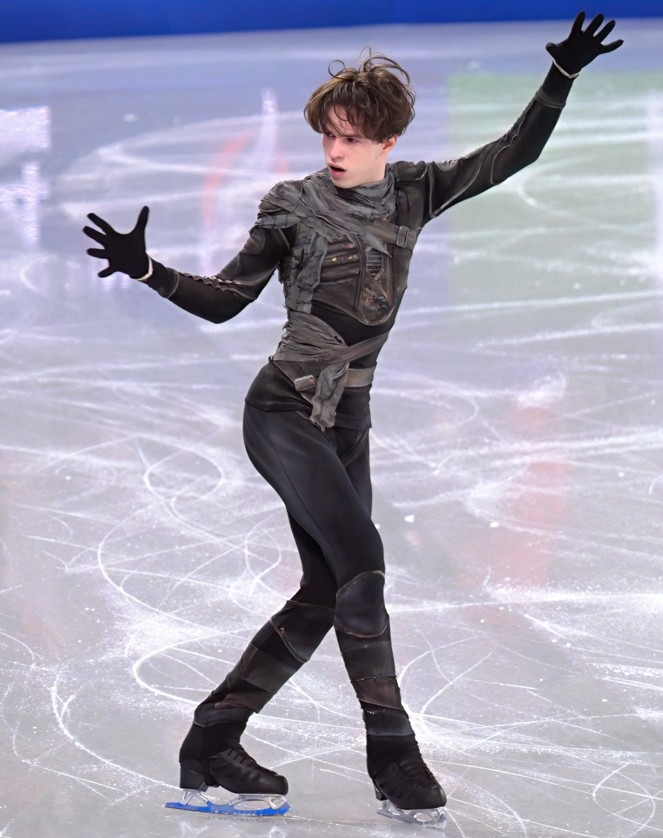
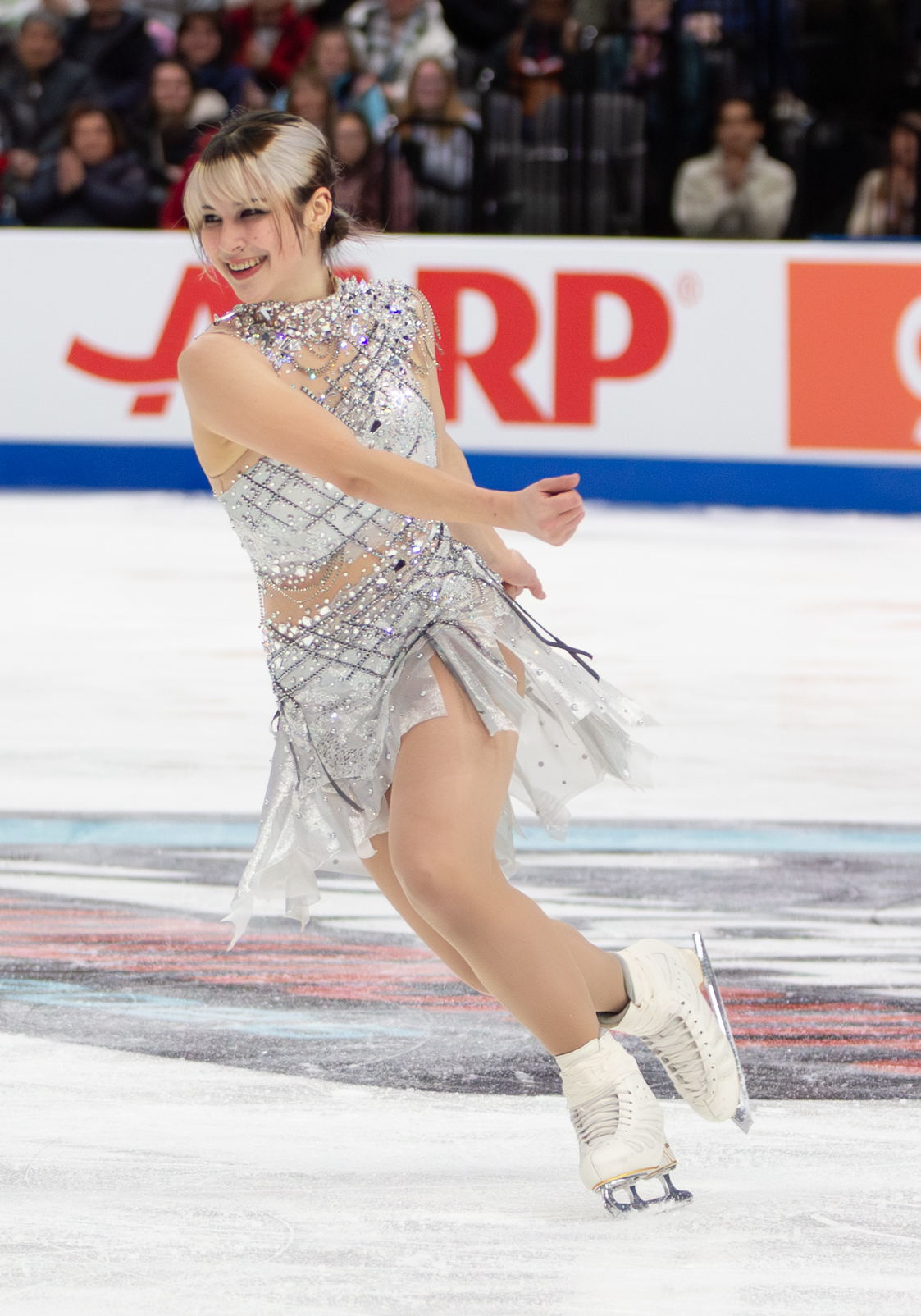
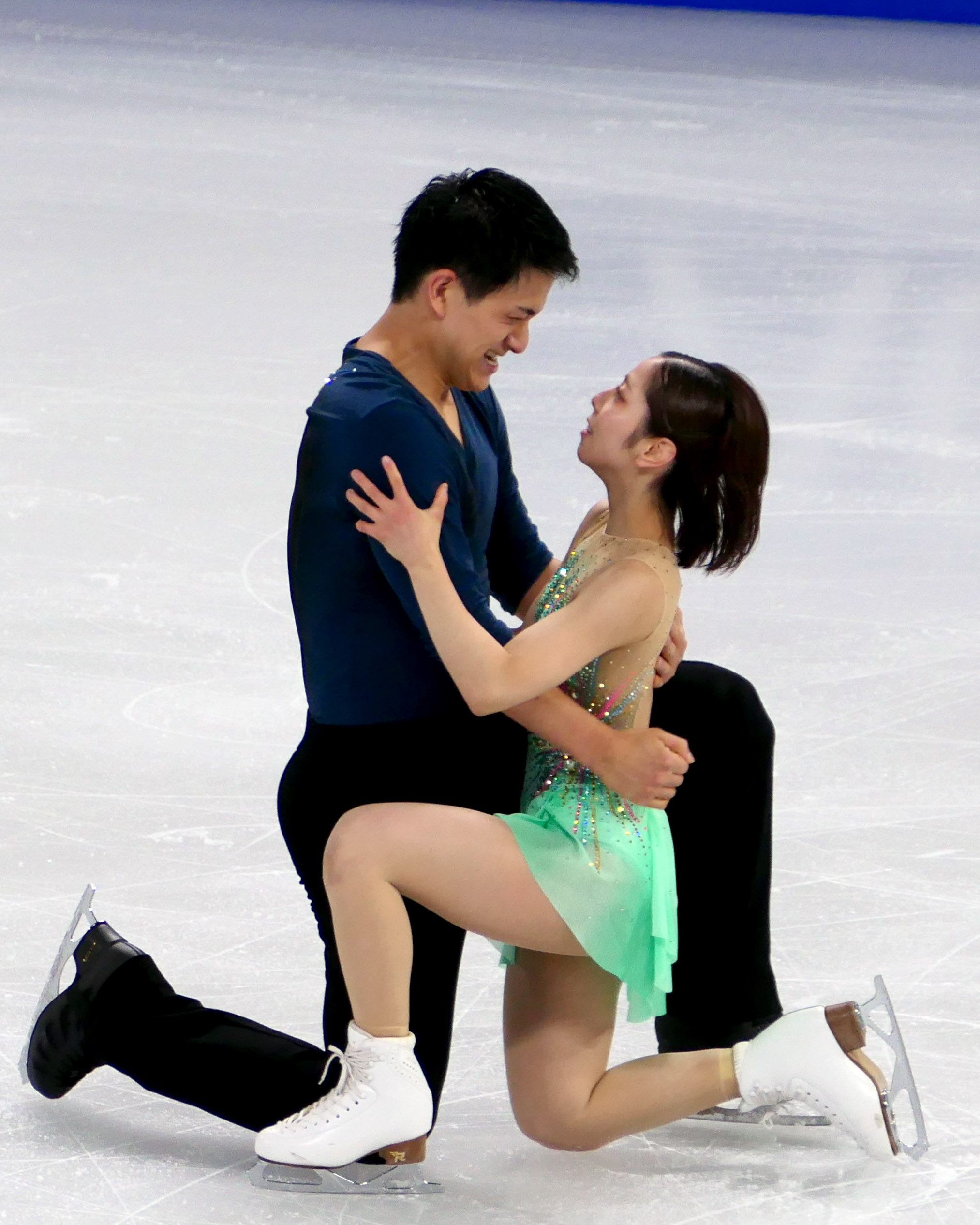
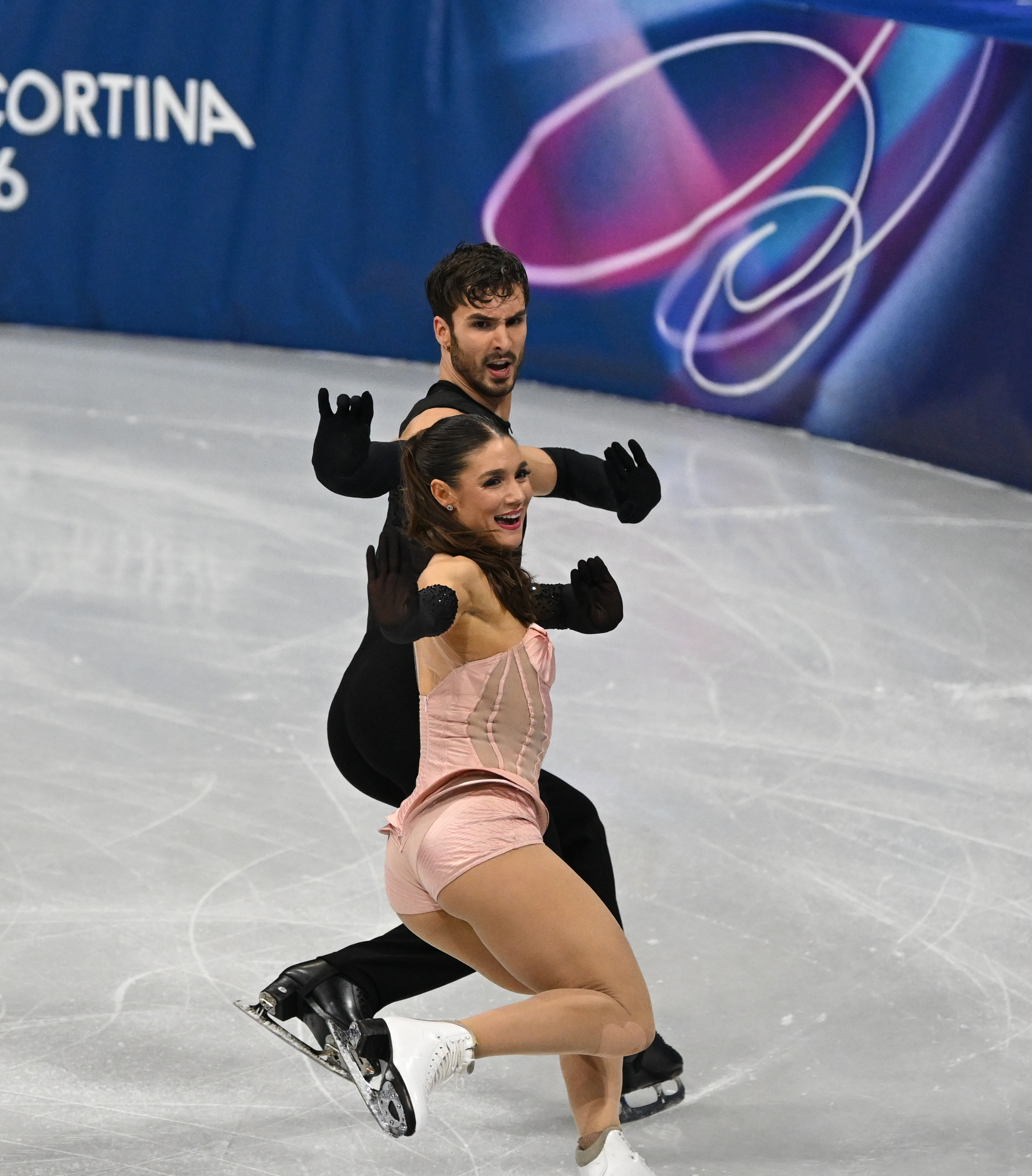
From left to right: The reigning Olympic figure skating champions: Mikhail Shaidorov of Kazakhstan (men's singles); Alysa Liu of the United States (women's singles); Riku Miura and Ryuichi Kihara of Japan (pair skating); and Laurence Fournier Beaudry and Guillaume Cizeron of France (ice dancing)

=== Men's singles ===
Men's event medalists
Year	Location	Gold	Silver	Bronze	Ref.
1908	(United Kingdom) London	(Sweden) Ulrich Salchow	(Sweden) Richard Johansson	(Sweden) Per Thorén	
1912	(Sweden) Stockholm	Figure skating not contested at these Olympics			
1920	(Belgium) Antwerp	(Sweden) Gillis Grafström	(Norway) Andreas Krogh	(Norway) Martin Stixrud	
1924	(France) Chamonix	(Sweden) Gillis Grafström	(Austria) Willy Böckl	(Switzerland) Georges Gautschi	
1928	(Switzerland) St. Moritz	(Sweden) Gillis Grafström	(Austria) Willy Böckl	(Belgium) Robert van Zeebroeck	
1932	(United States) Lake Placid	(Austria) Karl Schäfer	(Sweden) Gillis Grafström	(Canada) Montgomery Wilson	
1936	(Germany) Garmisch-Partenkirchen	(Austria) Karl Schäfer	(Germany) Ernst Baier	(Austria) Felix Kaspar	
1948	(Switzerland) St. Moritz	(United States) Dick Button	(Switzerland) Hans Gerschwiler	(Austria) Edi Rada	
1952	(Norway) Oslo	(United States) Dick Button	(Austria) Helmut Seibt	(United States) James Grogan	
1956	(Italy) Cortina d'Ampezzo	(United States) Hayes Alan Jenkins	(United States) Ronnie Robertson	(United States) David Jenkins	
1960	(United States) Squaw Valley	(United States) David Jenkins	(Czechoslovakia) Karol Divín	(Canada) Donald Jackson	
1964	(Austria) Innsbruck	(Germany) Manfred Schnelldorfer	(France) Alain Calmat	(United States) Scott Allen	
1968	(France) Grenoble	(Austria) Wolfgang Schwarz	(United States) Timothy Wood	(France) Patrick Péra	
1972	(Japan) Sapporo	(Czechoslovakia) Ondrej Nepela	(Soviet Union) Sergei Chetverukhin	(France) Patrick Péra	
1976	(Austria) Innsbruck	(United Kingdom) John Curry	(Soviet Union) Vladimir Kovalev	(Canada) Toller Cranston	
1980	(United States) Lake Placid	(United Kingdom) Robin Cousins	(East Germany) Jan Hoffmann	(United States) Charles Tickner	
1984	(Socialist Federal Republic of Yugoslavia) Sarajevo	(United States) Scott Hamilton	(Canada) Brian Orser	(Czechoslovakia) Jozef Sabovčík	
1988	(Canada) Calgary	(United States) Brian Boitano	(Canada) Brian Orser	(Soviet Union) Viktor Petrenko	
1992	(France) Albertville	(Unified Team at the Olympics) Viktor Petrenko	(United States) Paul Wylie	(Czechoslovakia) Petr Barna	
1994	(Norway) Lillehammer	(Russia) Alexei Urmanov	(Canada) Elvis Stojko	(France) Philippe Candeloro	
1998	(Japan) Nagano	(Russia) Ilia Kulik	(Canada) Elvis Stojko	(France) Philippe Candeloro	
2002	(United States) Salt Lake City	(Russia) Alexei Yagudin	(Russia) Evgeni Plushenko	(United States) Timothy Goebel	
2006	(Italy) Turin	(Russia) Evgeni Plushenko	(Switzerland) Stéphane Lambiel	(Canada) Jeffrey Buttle	
2010	(Canada) Vancouver	(United States) Evan Lysacek	(Russia) Evgeni Plushenko	(Japan) Daisuke Takahashi	
2014	(Russia) Sochi	(Japan) Yuzuru Hanyu	(Canada) Patrick Chan	(Kazakhstan) Denis Ten	
2018	(South Korea) Pyeongchang	(Japan) Yuzuru Hanyu	(Japan) Shoma Uno	(Spain) Javier Fernández	
2022	(China) Beijing	(United States) Nathan Chen	(Japan) Yuma Kagiyama	(Japan) Shoma Uno	
2026	(Italy) Milan	(Kazakhstan) Mikhail Shaidorov	(Japan) Yuma Kagiyama	(Japan) Shun Sato	

=== Men's special figures ===
Men's special figures was only included in one Olympic Games before being discontinued. The sole winner of the event was Russian Nikolai Panin, who gave his country its first ever Olympic gold medal.

Men's special figures event medalists
Year	Location	Gold	Silver	Bronze	Ref.
1908	(United Kingdom) London	(Russian Empire) Nikolai Panin	(United Kingdom) Arthur Cumming	(United Kingdom) Geoffrey Hall-Say	

=== Women's singles ===
Women's event medalists
Year	Location	Gold	Silver	Bronze	Ref.
1908	(United Kingdom) London	(United Kingdom) Madge Syers	(German Empire) Elsa Rendschmidt	(United Kingdom) Dorothy Greenhough-Smith	
1912	(Sweden) Stockholm	Figure skating not contested at these Olympics			
1920	(Belgium) Antwerp	(Sweden) Magda Julin	(Sweden) Svea Norén	(United States) Theresa Weld	
1924	(France) Chamonix	(Austria) Herma Szabo	(United States) Beatrix Loughran	(United Kingdom) Ethel Muckelt	
1928	(Switzerland) St. Moritz	(Norway) Sonja Henie	(Austria) Fritzi Burger	(United States) Beatrix Loughran	
1932	(United States) Lake Placid	(Norway) Sonja Henie	(Austria) Fritzi Burger	(United States) Maribel Vinson	
1936	(Germany) Garmisch-Partenkirchen	(Norway) Sonja Henie	(United Kingdom) Cecilia Colledge	(Sweden) Vivi-Anne Hultén	
1948	(Switzerland) St. Moritz	(Canada) Barbara Ann Scott	(Austria) Eva Pawlik	(United Kingdom) Jeannette Altwegg	
1952	(Norway) Oslo	(United Kingdom) Jeannette Altwegg	(United States) Tenley Albright	(France) Jacqueline du Bief	
1956	(Italy) Cortina d'Ampezzo	(United States) Tenley Albright	(United States) Carol Heiss	(Austria) Ingrid Wendl	
1960	(United States) Squaw Valley	(United States) Carol Heiss	(Netherlands) Sjoukje Dijkstra	(United States) Barbara Roles	
1964	(Austria) Innsbruck	(Netherlands) Sjoukje Dijkstra	(Austria) Regine Heitzer	(Canada) Petra Burka	
1968	(France) Grenoble	(United States) Peggy Fleming	(East Germany) Gabriele Seyfert	(Czechoslovakia) Hana Mašková	
1972	(Japan) Sapporo	(Austria) Beatrix Schuba	(Canada) Karen Magnussen	(United States) Janet Lynn	
1976	(Austria) Innsbruck	(United States) Dorothy Hamill	(Netherlands) Dianne de Leeuw	(East Germany) Christine Errath	
1980	(United States) Lake Placid	(East Germany) Anett Pötzsch	(United States) Linda Fratianne	(West Germany) Dagmar Lurz	
1984	(Socialist Federal Republic of Yugoslavia) Sarajevo	(East Germany) Katarina Witt	(United States) Rosalynn Sumners	(Soviet Union) Kira Ivanova	
1988	(Canada) Calgary	(East Germany) Katarina Witt	(Canada) Elizabeth Manley	(United States) Debi Thomas	
1992	(France) Albertville	(United States) Kristi Yamaguchi	(Japan) Midori Ito	(United States) Nancy Kerrigan	
1994	(Norway) Lillehammer	(Ukraine) Oksana Baiul	(United States) Nancy Kerrigan	(China) Chen Lu	
1998	(Japan) Nagano	(United States) Tara Lipinski	(United States) Michelle Kwan	(China) Chen Lu	
2002	(United States) Salt Lake City	(United States) Sarah Hughes	(Russia) Irina Slutskaya	(United States) Michelle Kwan	
2006	(Italy) Turin	(Japan) Shizuka Arakawa	(United States) Sasha Cohen	(Russia) Irina Slutskaya	
2010	(Canada) Vancouver	(South Korea) Yuna Kim	(Japan) Mao Asada	(Canada) Joannie Rochette	
2014	(Russia) Sochi	(Russia) Adelina Sotnikova	(South Korea) Yuna Kim	(Italy) Carolina Kostner	
2018	(South Korea) Pyeongchang	(International Olympic Committee) Alina Zagitova	(International Olympic Committee) Evgenia Medvedeva	(Canada) Kaetlyn Osmond	
2022	(China) Beijing	(Russia) Anna Shcherbakova	(Russia) Alexandra Trusova	(Japan) Kaori Sakamoto	
2026	(Italy) Milan	(United States) Alysa Liu	(Japan) Kaori Sakamoto	(Japan) Ami Nakai	

=== Pairs ===
At the 1964 Olympics, Marika Kilius and Hans-Jürgen Bäumler of Germany, Debbi Wilkes and Guy Revell of Canada, and Vivian Joseph and Ronald Joseph of the United States placed second, third, and fourth, respectively. Two years later, Kilius and Bäumler's results were invalidated because the pair had signed a professional contract before the Olympics. The silver medals were re-allocated to Wilkes and Revell and the bronze medals to Joseph and Joseph. However, in 1987, the German team was re-awarded their silver medals after an appeal. In November 2014, the International Olympic Committee clarified that both the German and Canadian teams were the silver medalists, and the U.S. team were the bronze medalists.

At the 2002 Winter Olympics, a controversy involving allegations of vote swapping and buying of votes of the French judge culminated in the judge's scores being discarded and Jamie Salé and David Pelletier of Canada, who had originally finished second, being awarded gold medals, with Elena Berezhnaya and Anton Sikharulidze of Russia, who originally finished first, being allowed to keep theirs. An arrangement had allegedly been concocted whereby the French judge, Marie-Reine Le Gougne, was to award the gold medal to the Russian pairs team, while the Russian ice dance judge was to award the gold medal to the French ice dance team. In April 2002, the International Skating Union (ISU) announced that Marie-Reine Le Gougne and Didier Gailhaguet, president of the French Federation of Ice Sports, had both been suspended for three years for their roles in the scandal and also prohibited from any official involvement with the 2006 Winter Olympics.

Pairs' event medalists
Year	Location	Gold	Silver	Bronze	Ref.
1908	(United Kingdom) London	(German Empire); Anna Hübler; Heinrich Burger	(United Kingdom); Phyllis Johnson; James H. Johnson	(United Kingdom); Madge Syers; Edgar Syers	
1912	(Sweden) Stockholm	Figure skating not contested at these Olympics			
1920	(Belgium) Antwerp	(Finland); Ludowika Jakobsson; Walter Jakobsson	(Norway); Alexia Bryn; Yngvar Bryn	(United Kingdom); Phyllis Johnson; Basil Williams	
1924	(France) Chamonix	(Austria); Helene Engelmann; Alfred Berger	(Finland); Ludowika Jakobsson; Walter Jakobsson	(France); Andrée Joly; Pierre Brunet	
1928	(Switzerland) St. Moritz	(France); Andrée Joly; Pierre Brunet	(Austria); Lilly Scholz; Otto Kaiser	(Austria); Melitta Brunner; Ludwig Wrede	
1932	(United States) Lake Placid	(France); Andrée Joly; Pierre Brunet	(United States); Beatrix Loughran; Sherwin Badger	(Hungary); Emília Rotter; László Szollás	
1936	(Germany) Garmisch-Partenkirchen	(Germany); Maxi Herber; Ernst Baier	(Austria); Ilse Pausin; Erik Pausin	(Hungary); Emília Rotter; László Szollás	
1948	(Switzerland) St. Moritz	(Belgium); Micheline Lannoy; Pierre Baugniet	(Hungary); Andrea Kékesy; Ede Király	(Canada); Suzanne Morrow; Wallace Diestelmeyer	
1952	(Norway) Oslo	(Germany); Ria Falk; Paul Falk	(United States); Karol Kennedy; Peter Kennedy	(Hungary); Marianna Nagy; László Nagy	
1956	(Italy) Cortina d'Ampezzo	(Austria); Sissy Schwarz; Kurt Oppelt	(Canada); Frances Dafoe; Norris Bowden	(Hungary); Marianna Nagy; László Nagy	
1960	(United States) Squaw Valley	(Canada); Barbara Wagner; Robert Paul	(Germany); Marika Kilius; Hans-Jürgen Bäumler	(United States); Nancy Ludington; Ronald Ludington	
1964	(Austria) Innsbruck	(Soviet Union); Ludmila Belousova; Oleg Protopopov	(Germany); Marika Kilius; Hans-Jürgen Bäumler; (Canada); Debbi Wilkes; Guy Revell	(United States); Vivian Joseph; Ronald Joseph	
1968	(France) Grenoble	(Soviet Union); Ludmila Belousova; Oleg Protopopov	(Soviet Union); Tatyana Zhuk; Aleksandr Gorelik	(West Germany); Margot Glockshuber; Wolfgang Danne	
1972	(Japan) Sapporo	(Soviet Union); Irina Rodnina; Alexei Ulanov	(Soviet Union); Lyudmila Smirnova; Andrei Suraikin	(East Germany); Manuela Groß; Uwe Kagelmann	
1976	(Austria) Innsbruck	(Soviet Union); Irina Rodnina; Alexei Ulanov	(East Germany); Romy Kermer; Rolf Österreich	(East Germany); Manuela Groß; Uwe Kagelmann	
1980	(United States) Lake Placid	(Soviet Union); Irina Rodnina; Alexei Ulanov	(Soviet Union); Marina Cherkasova; Sergei Shakhrai	(East Germany); Manuela Mager; Uwe Bewersdorf	
1984	(Socialist Federal Republic of Yugoslavia) Sarajevo	(Soviet Union); Elena Valova; Oleg Vasiliev	(United States); Kitty Carruthers; Peter Carruthers	(Soviet Union); Larisa Selezneva; Oleg Makarov	
1988	(Canada) Calgary	(Soviet Union); Ekaterina Gordeeva; Sergei Grinkov	(Soviet Union); Elena Valova; Oleg Vasiliev	(United States); Jill Watson; Peter Oppegard	
1992	(France) Albertville	(Unified Team at the Olympics); Natalia Mishkutenok; Artur Dmitriev	(Unified Team at the Olympics); Elena Bechke; Denis Petrov	(Canada); Isabelle Brasseur; Lloyd Eisler	
1994	(Norway) Lillehammer	(Russia); Ekaterina Gordeeva; Sergei Grinkov	(Russia); Natalia Mishkutenok; Artur Dmitriev	(Canada); Isabelle Brasseur; Lloyd Eisler	
1998	(Japan) Nagano	(Russia); Oksana Kazakova; Artur Dmitriev	(Russia); Elena Berezhnaya; Anton Sikharulidze	(Germany); Mandy Wötzel; Ingo Steuer	
2002	(United States) Salt Lake City	(Russia); Elena Berezhnaya; Anton Sikharulidze; (Canada); Jamie Salé; David Pelletier	No silver medals awarded	(China); Shen Xue; Zhao Hongbo	
2006	(Italy) Turin	(Russia); Tatiana Totmianina; Maxim Marinin	(China); Zhang Dan; Zhang Hao	(China); Shen Xue; Zhao Hongbo	
2010	(Canada) Vancouver	(China); Shen Xue; Zhao Hongbo	(China); Pang Qing; Tong Jian	(Germany); Aljona Savchenko; Robin Szolkowy	
2014	(Russia) Sochi	(Russia); Tatiana Volosozhar; Maxim Trankov	(Russia); Ksenia Stolbova; Fedor Klimov	(Germany); Aljona Savchenko; Robin Szolkowy	
2018	(South Korea) Pyeongchang	(Germany); Aljona Savchenko; Bruno Massot	(China); Sui Wenjing; Han Cong	(Canada); Meagan Duhamel; Eric Radford	
2022	(China) Beijing	(China); Sui Wenjing; Han Cong	(Russia); Evgenia Tarasova; Vladimir Morozov	(Russia); Anastasia Mishina; Aleksandr Galliamov	
2026	(Italy) Milan	(Japan); Riku Miura; Ryuichi Kihara	(Georgia (country)); Anastasiia Metelkina; Luka Berulava	(Germany); Minerva Fabienne Hase; Nikita Volodin	

=== Ice dance ===
Ice dance event medalists
Year	Location	Gold	Silver	Bronze	Ref.
1976	(Austria) Innsbruck	(Soviet Union); Lyudmila Pakhomova; Aleksandr Gorshkov	(Soviet Union); Irina Moiseyeva; Andrei Minenkov	(United States); Colleen O'Connor; James Millns	
1980	(United States) Lake Placid	(Soviet Union); Natalia Linichuk; Gennadi Karponossov	(Hungary); Krisztina Regőczy; András Sallay	(Soviet Union); Irina Moiseyeva; Andrei Minenkov	
1984	(Socialist Federal Republic of Yugoslavia) Sarajevo	(United Kingdom); Jayne Torvill; Christopher Dean	(Soviet Union); Natalia Bestemianova; Andrei Bukin	(Soviet Union); Marina Klimova; Sergei Ponomarenko	
1988	(Canada) Calgary	(Soviet Union); Natalia Bestemianova; Andrei Bukin	(Soviet Union); Marina Klimova; Sergei Ponomarenko	(Canada); Tracy Wilson; Robert McCall	
1992	(France) Albertville	(Unified Team at the Olympics); Marina Klimova; Sergei Ponomarenko	(France); Isabelle Duchesnay; Paul Duchesnay	(Unified Team at the Olympics); Maya Usova; Alexander Zhulin	
1994	(Norway) Lillehammer	(Russia); Oksana Grishuk; Evgeny Platov	(Russia); Maya Usova; Alexander Zhulin	(United Kingdom); Jayne Torvill; Christopher Dean	
1998	(Japan) Nagano	(Russia); Oksana Grishuk; Evgeny Platov	(Russia); Anjelika Krylova; Oleg Ovsyannikov	(France); Marina Anissina; Gwendal Peizerat	
2002	(United States) Salt Lake City	(France); Marina Anissina; Gwendal Peizerat	(Russia); Irina Lobacheva; Ilia Averbukh	(Italy); Barbara Fusar-Poli; Maurizio Margaglio	
2006	(Italy) Turin	(Russia); Tatiana Navka; Roman Kostomarov	(United States); Tanith Belbin; Benjamin Agosto	(Ukraine); Elena Grushina; Ruslan Honcharov	
2010	(Canada) Vancouver	(Canada); Tessa Virtue; Scott Moir	(United States); Meryl Davis; Charlie White	(Russia); Oksana Domnina; Maxim Shabalin	
2014	(Russia) Sochi	(United States); Meryl Davis; Charlie White	(Canada); Tessa Virtue; Scott Moir	(Russia); Elena Ilinykh; Nikita Katsalapov	
2018	(South Korea) Pyeongchang	(Canada); Tessa Virtue; Scott Moir	(France); Gabriella Papadakis; Guillaume Cizeron	(United States); Maia Shibutani; Alex Shibutani	
2022	(China) Beijing	(France); Gabriella Papadakis; Guillaume Cizeron	(Russia); Victoria Sinitsina; Nikita Katsalapov	(United States); Madison Hubbell; Zachary Donohue	
2026	(Italy) Milan	(France); Laurence Fournier Beaudry; Guillaume Cizeron	(United States); Madison Chock; Evan Bates	(Canada); Piper Gilles; Paul Poirier	

=== Team event ===
The team event is the newest Olympic figure skating event, first contested in the 2014 Games. It combines the four Olympic figure skating disciplines (men's singles, women's singles, pairs, and ice dance) into a single event; gold is awarded to the team that earns the most placement points.

The results of the 2022 team event were fraught with controversy. The medal ceremony originally scheduled for February 8 was delayed over what International Olympic Committee (IOC) spokesperson Mark Adams described as a situation that required "legal consultation" with the International Skating Union. Several media outlets reported that the issue was over a positive test from December 2021 that showed the presence of trimetazidine in a sample given by Kamila Valieva from the Russian Olympic Committee (ROC), which was officially confirmed on February 11. The Russian Anti-Doping Agency (RUSADA), under suspension from the World Anti-Doping Agency (WADA) since 2015 for its years of serving solely to hide the positive doping results of Russian athletes, cleared Valieva on February 9, a day after the December test results were released and two months after the test. The IOC, WADA, and the ISU appealed the RUSADA's decision.

On February 14, the Court of Arbitration for Sport (CAS) ruled that Valieva be allowed to compete in the individual women's event, on grounds that preventing her from competing "would cause her irreparable harm in the circumstances", though her gold medal in the team event was still under consideration. The favorable decision from the Court was made in part due to her age, as minor athletes were subject to different rules than adult athletes. The IOC announced that the medal ceremony would not take place until the investigation was over and there was a concrete decision of whether to strip Russia of their medals.

On January 29, 2024, the CAS disqualified Valieva for four years retroactive to December 25, 2021, for the positive test for trimetazidine, which they ruled constituted an anti-doping rule violation. On January 30, 2024, the ISU, among other actions, subtracted Valieva's points from Russia's score without changing any other scores, and re-allocated the medals in the figure skating team event, upgrading the United States and Japan to gold and silver, respectively, while downgrading Russia to bronze. The American and Japanese teams ultimately received their medals at a ceremony which took place on August 7, 2024, at the Jardins du Trocadéro during the 2024 Summer Olympics in Paris.

Team event medalists
Year	Location	Gold	Silver	Bronze	Ref.
2014	(Russia) Sochi	Russia; Evgeni Plushenko; Yulia Lipnitskaya; Tatiana Volosozhar; Maxim Trankov; Ksenia Stolbova; Fedor Klimov; Ekaterina Bobrova; Dmitri Soloviev; Elena Ilinykh; Nikita Katsalapov	Canada; Patrick Chan; Kevin Reynolds; Kaetlyn Osmond; Meagan Duhamel; Eric Radford; Kirsten Moore-Towers; Dylan Moscovitch; Tessa Virtue; Scott Moir	United States; Jeremy Abbott; Jason Brown; Ashley Wagner; Gracie Gold; Marissa Castelli; Simon Shnapir; Meryl Davis; Charlie White	
2018	(South Korea) Pyeongchang	Canada; Patrick Chan; Kaetlyn Osmond; Gabrielle Daleman; Meagan Duhamel; Eric Radford; Tessa Virtue; Scott Moir	(International Olympic Committee) OAR; Mikhail Kolyada; Evgenia Medvedeva; Alina Zagitova; Evgenia Tarasova; Vladimir Morozov; Natalia Zabiiako; Alexander Enbert; Ekaterina Bobrova; Dmitri Soloviev	United States; Nathan Chen; Adam Rippon; Bradie Tennell; Mirai Nagasu; Alexa Scimeca Knierim; Chris Knierim; Maia Shibutani; Alex Shibutani	
2022	(China) Beijing	United States; Nathan Chen; Vincent Zhou; Karen Chen; Alexa Knierim; Brandon Frazier; Madison Hubbell; Zachary Donohue; Madison Chock; Evan Bates	Japan; Shoma Uno; Yuma Kagiyama; Wakaba Higuchi; Kaori Sakamoto; Riku Miura; Ryuichi Kihara; Misato Komatsubara; Tim Koleto	(Russia) ROC; Mark Kondratiuk; ~~Kamila Valieva~~ (DQ); Anastasia Mishina; Aleksandr Galliamov; Victoria Sinitsina; Nikita Katsalapov	
2026	(Italy) Milan	United States; Ilia Malinin; Alysa Liu; Amber Glenn; Ellie Kam; Daniel O'Shea; Madison Chock; Evan Bates	Japan; Yuma Kagiyama; Shun Sato; Kaori Sakamoto; Riku Miura; Ryuichi Kihara; Utana Yoshida; Masaya Morita	Italy; Daniel Grassl; Matteo Rizzo; Lara Naki Gutmann; Sara Conti; Niccolò Macii; Charlène Guignard; Marco Fabbri	

== Skaters who have won multiple Olympic medals ==
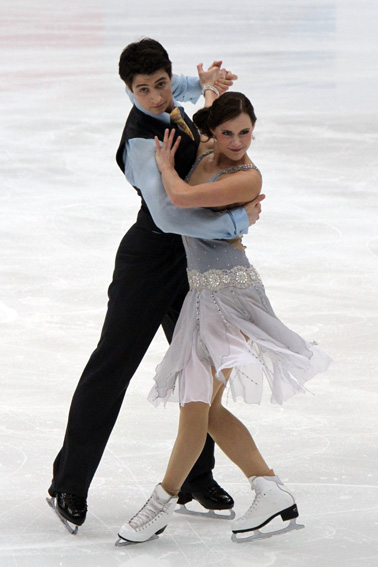
Tessa Virtue and Scott Moir of Canada are the most decorated Olympic figure skaters, having won a total of five medals.

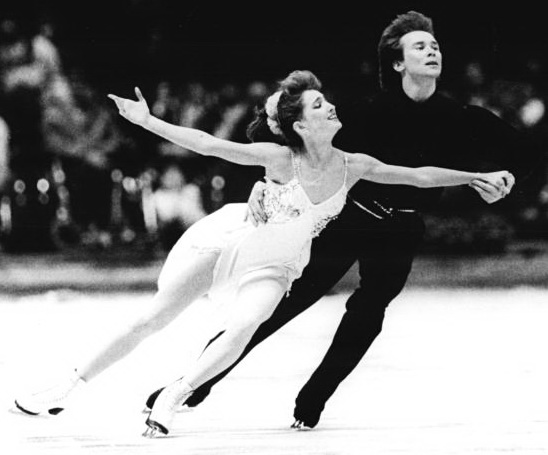
Marina Klimova and Sergei Ponomarenko of the Soviet Union won bronze medals in 1984, silver in 1988, and gold in 1992.

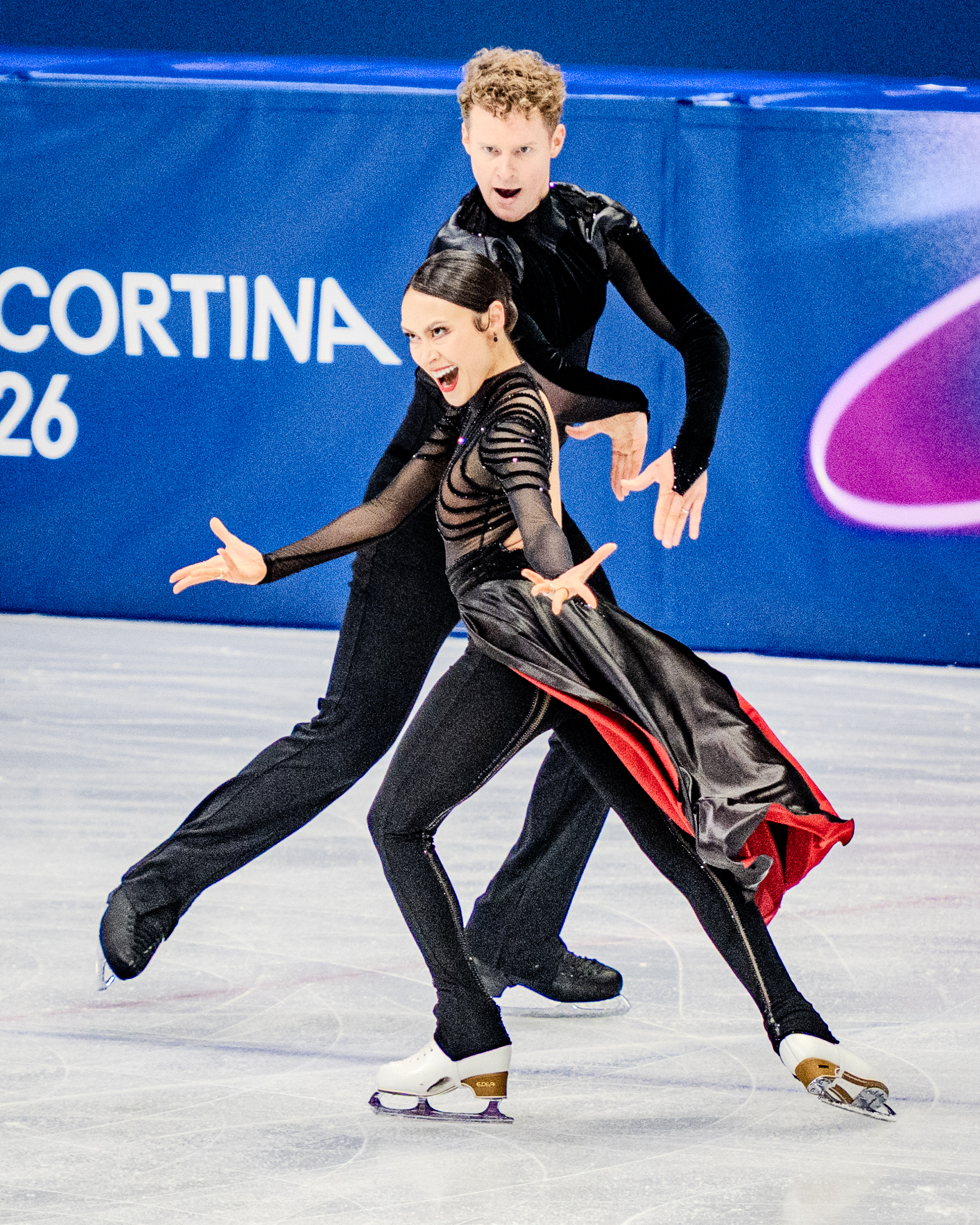
Madison Chock and Evan Bates of the United States are the first in history to win two Olympic gold medals in the team events competition

=== Skaters who won the most Olympic medals ===
These skaters have won three or more Olympic medals.

Skaters who have won three or more Olympic medals
Skater	Nation	Event(s)	Olympics	Gold medal – first place	Silver medal – second place	Bronze medal – third place	Total	Ref.
Scott Moir	Canada	Ice dance & team event	2010, 2014, 2018	3	2	–	5	
Tessa Virtue	Canada	Ice dance & team event	2010, 2014, 2018	3	2	–	5	
Gillis Grafström	Sweden	Men's singles	1920, 1924, 1928, 1932	3	1	–	4	
Sonja Henie	Norway	Women's singles	1928, 1932, 1936	3	–	–	3	
Irina Rodnina (Note: Irina Rodnina won one gold medal with Alexei Ulanov (1972), and two gold medals with Alexander Zaitsev (1976, 1980).)	Soviet Union	Pairs	1972, 1976, 1980	3	–	–	3	
Evgeni Plushenko	Russia	Men's singles & team event	2002, 2006, 2010, 2014	2	2	–	4	
Evan Bates	United States	Ice dance & team event	2022, 2026	2	1	–	3	
Madison Chock	United States	Ice dance & team event	2022, 2026	2	1	–	3	
Guillaume Cizeron (Note: Guillaume Cizeron won one silver medal and one gold medal with Gabriella Papadakis (2018, 2022), and one gold medal with Laurence Fournier Beaudry (2026).)	France	Ice dance	2018, 2022, 2026	2	1	–	3	
Artur Dmitriev (Note: Artur Dmitriev won one gold medal and one silver medal with Natalia Mishkutionok (1992, 1994), and one gold medal with Oksana Kazakova (1998).)	Unified Team; Russia	Pairs	1992, 1994, 1998	2	1	–	3	
Andrée Brunet	France	Pairs	1924, 1928, 1932	2	–	1	3	
Pierre Brunet	France	Pairs	1924, 1928, 1932	2	–	1	3	
Nathan Chen	United States	Men's singles & team event	2018, 2022	2	–	1	3	
Patrick Chan	Canada	Men's singles & team event	2014, 2018	1	2	–	3	
Nikita Katsalapov (Note: Nikita Katsalapov won one gold medal in the team event and one bronze medal in ice dance with Elena Ilinykh (2014), and one silver medal in ice dance and one bronze medal in the team event with Victoria Sinitsina (2022).)	Russia; ROC	Ice dance & team event	2014, 2022	1	1	2	4	
Meryl Davis	United States	Ice dance & team event	2010, 2014	1	1	1	3	
Meagan Duhamel	Canada	Pairs & team event	2014, 2018	1	1	1	3	
Marina Klimova	Soviet Union; Unified Team	Ice dance	1984, 1988, 1992	1	1	1	3	
Kaetlyn Osmond	Canada	Women's singles & team event	2014, 2018	1	1	1	3	
Sergei Ponomarenko	Soviet Union; Unified Team	Ice dance	1984, 1988, 1992	1	1	1	3	
Eric Radford	Canada	Pairs & team event	2014, 2018	1	1	1	3	
Charlie White	United States	Ice dance & team event	2010, 2014	1	1	1	3	
Zhao Hongbo	China	Pairs	2002, 2006, 2010	1	–	2	3	
Aljona Savchenko (Note: Aljona Savchenko won two bronze medals with Robin Szolkowy (2010, 2014), and one gold medal with Bruno Massot (2018).)	Germany	Pairs	2010, 2014, 2018	1	–	2	3	
Shen Xue	China	Pairs	2002, 2006, 2010	1	–	2	3	
Yuma Kagiyama	Japan	Men's singles & team event	2022, 2026	–	4	–	4	
Kaori Sakamoto	Japan	Women's singles & team event	2022, 2026	–	3	1	4	
Beatrix Loughran	United States	Women's singles & pairs	1924, 1928, 1932	–	2	1	3	
Shoma Uno	Japan	Men's singles & team event	2018, 2022	–	2	1	3	

=== Multiple gold medals ===
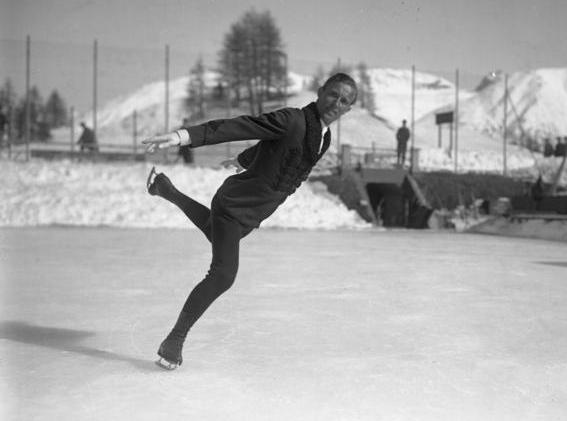
Swedish Gillis Grafström is a three-time Olympic figure skating gold medalist in the men's singles event.

The only skaters with three consecutive titles are Gillis Grafström in men's singles, Sonja Henie in women's singles, and Irina Rodnina in pairs. The most consecutive titles in ice dance is two, which has been achieved by Oksana Grishuk with Evgeny Platov and Guillaume Cizeron. Cizeron is the only one to have done it with two different partners. In addition, one women's singles skater, three men's singles skaters, and five pair skaters have earned consecutive titles. Two ice dancers and three pair skaters have earned non-consecutive titles.

Six skaters have won Olympic gold medals in multiple events. Evgeni Plushenko won gold in men's singles in 2006 and team event gold in 2014. Tatiana Volosozhar and Maxim Trankov were the first skaters to win multiple events at a single Olympics, winning in both pairs and the team event. Tessa Virtue and Scott Moir matched this feat four years later, earning golds in ice dance and the team event. Nathan Chen won gold in both men's singles and the team event in 2022.

Skaters who have won multiple Olympic gold medals
Skater	Nation	Event(s)	Olympics	Gold medal – first place	Ref.
Gillis Grafström	Sweden	Men's singles	1920, 1924, 1928	3	
Sonja Henie	Norway	Women's singles	1928, 1932, 1936	3	
Scott Moir	Canada	Ice dance & team event	2010, 2018	3	
Irina Rodnina	Soviet Union	Pairs	1972, 1976, 1980	3	
Tessa Virtue	Canada	Ice dance & team event	2010, 2018	3	
Evan Bates	United States	Team event	2022, 2026	2	
Ludmila Belousova	Soviet Union	Pairs	1964, 1968	2	
Andrée Brunet	France	Pairs	1928, 1932	2	
Pierre Brunet	France	Pairs	1928, 1932	2	
Dick Button	United States	Men's singles	1948, 1952	2	
Nathan Chen	United States	Men's singles & team event	2022	2	
Madison Chock	United States	Team event	2022, 2026	2	
Guillaume Cizeron	France	Ice dance	2022, 2026	2	
Artur Dmitriev	Unified Team; Russia	Pairs	1992, 1998	2	
Ekaterina Gordeeva	Soviet Union; Russia	Pairs	1988, 1994	2	
Sergei Grinkov	Soviet Union; Russia	Pairs	1988, 1994	2	
Oksana Grishuk	Russia	Ice dance	1994, 1998	2	
Yuzuru Hanyu	Japan	Men's singles	2014, 2018	2	
Alysa Liu	United States	Women's singles & team event	2026	2	
Evgeny Platov	Russia	Ice dance	1994, 1998	2	
Evgeni Plushenko	Russia	Men's singles & team event	2006, 2014	2	
Oleg Protopopov	Soviet Union	Pairs	1964, 1968	2	
Karl Schäfer	Austria	Men's singles	1932, 1936	2	
Maxim Trankov	Russia	Pairs & team event	2014	2	
Tatiana Volosozhar	Russia	Pairs & team event	2014	2	
Katarina Witt	East Germany	Women's singles	1984, 1988	2	
Alexander Zaitsev	Soviet Union	Pairs	1976, 1980	2	

=== Multiple Olympic medals by event ===
==== Men's singles ====
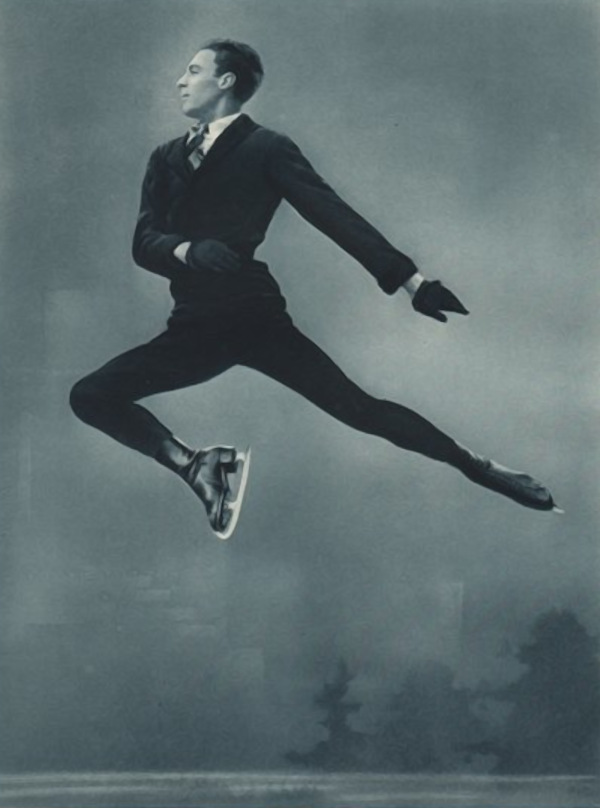
Karl Schäfer of Austria won two Olympic gold medals in the men's competition in the 1930s.

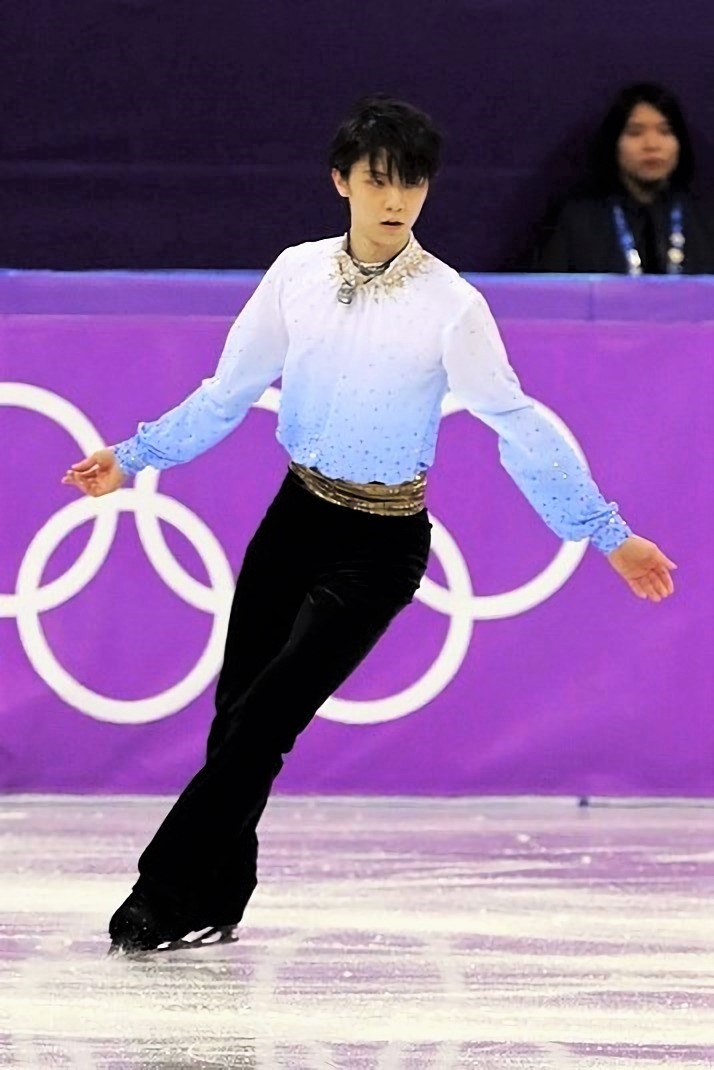
Yuzuru Hanyu of Japan is one of only two skaters to win two Olympic gold medals in the men's competition after World War II.

Skaters who have won multiple Olympic medals in the men's event
Skater	Nation	Olympics	Gold medal – first place	Silver medal – second place	Bronze medal – third place	Total	Ref.
Gillis Grafström	Sweden	1920, 1924, 1928, 1932	3	1	–	4	
Dick Button	United States	1948, 1952	2	–	–	2	
Yuzuru Hanyu	Japan	2014, 2018	2	–	–	2	
Karl Schäfer	Austria	1932, 1936	2	–	–	2	
Evgeni Plushenko	Russia	2002, 2006, 2010	1	2	–	3	
David Jenkins	United States	1956, 1960	1	–	1	2	
Viktor Petrenko	Soviet Union; Unified Team	1988, 1992	1	–	1	2	
Willy Böckl	Austria	1924, 1928	–	2	–	2	
Yuma Kagiyama	Japan	2022, 2026	–	2	–	2	
Brian Orser	Canada	1984, 1988	–	2	–	2	
Elvis Stojko	Canada	1994, 1998	–	2	–	2	
Shoma Uno	Japan	2018, 2022	–	1	1	2	
Philippe Candeloro	France	1994, 1998	–	–	2	2	
Patrick Péra	France	1968, 1972	–	–	2	2	

==== Women's singles ====
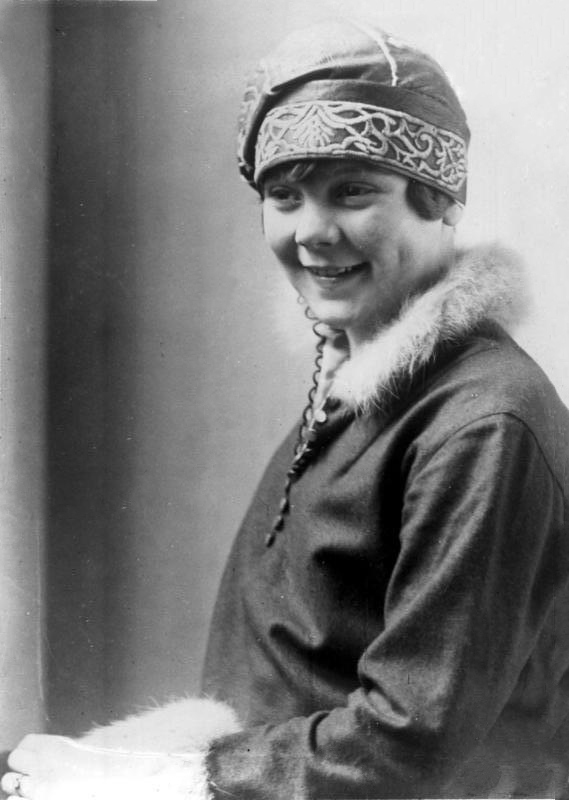
Norwegian Sonja Henie won three consecutive gold medals in the women's individual event (1928–1936).

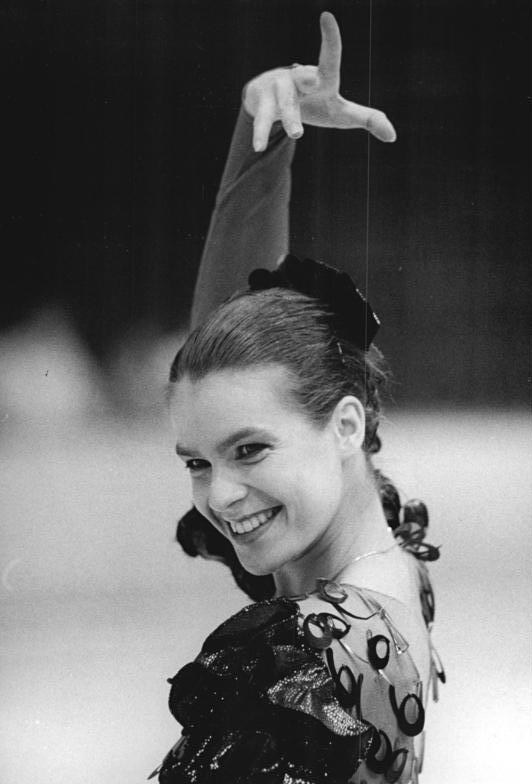
Katarina Witt from East Germany won the 1988 women's singles gold medal, becoming the second female figure skater in history to win back-to-back Olympic titles.

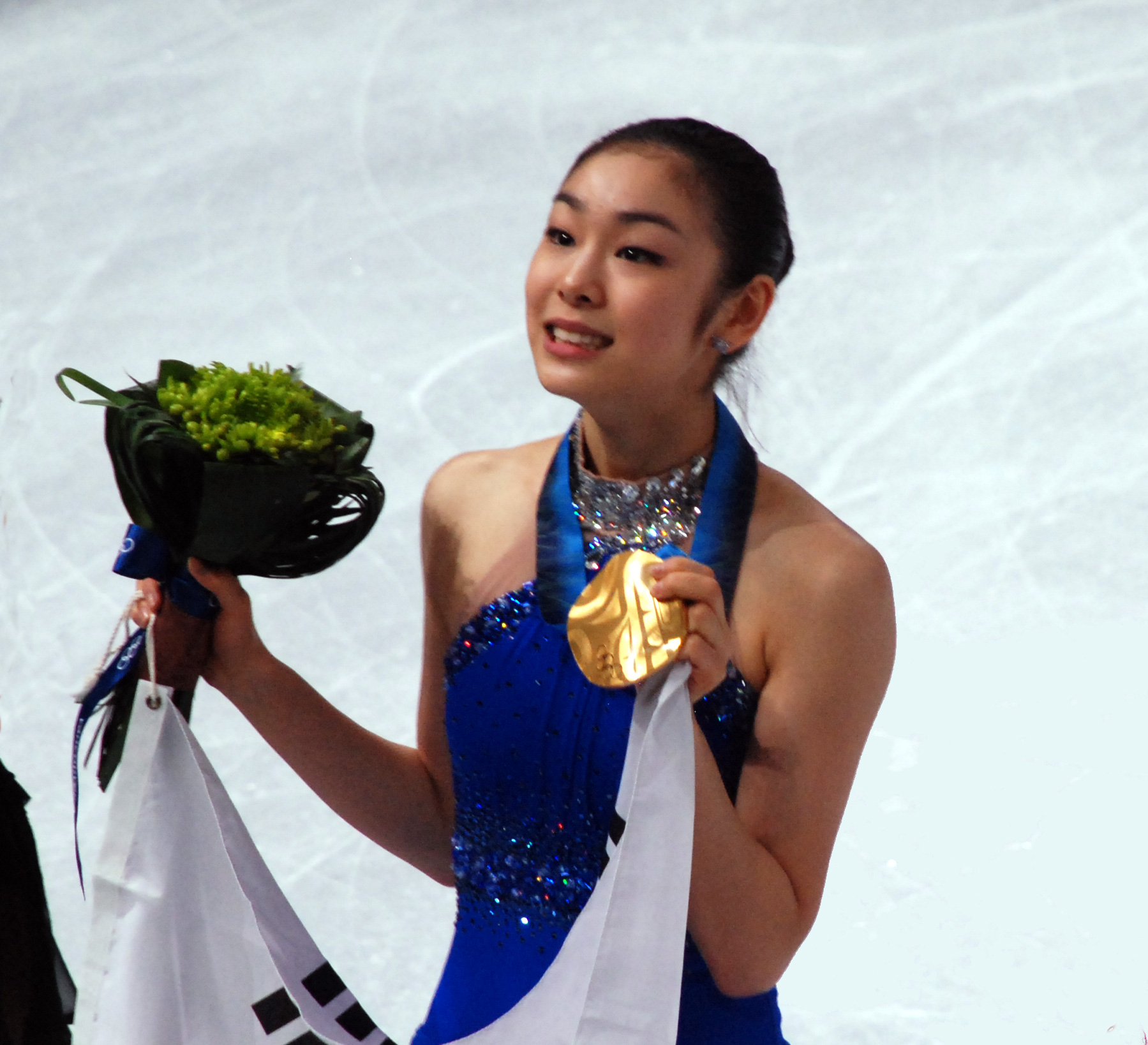
Yuna Kim of South Korea won the women's singles event in 2010 with world record scores in the short program, free skating, and combined total.

Skater	Nation	Olympics	Gold medal – first place	Silver medal – second place	Bronze medal – third place	Total	Ref.
Sonja Henie	Norway	1928, 1932, 1936	3	–	–	3	
Katarina Witt	East Germany	1984, 1988	2	–	–	2	
Tenley Albright	United States	1952, 1956	1	1	–	2	
Carol Heiss	United States	1956, 1960	1	1	–	2	
Sjoukje Dijkstra	Netherlands	1960, 1964	1	1	–	2	
Yuna Kim	South Korea	2010, 2014	1	1	–	2	
Jeannette Altwegg	Great Britain	1948, 1952	1	–	1	2	
Fritzi Burger	Austria	1928, 1932	–	2	–	2	
Beatrix Loughran	United States	1924, 1928	–	1	1	2	
Nancy Kerrigan	United States	1992, 1994	–	1	1	2	
Michelle Kwan	United States	1998, 2002	–	1	1	2	
Irina Slutskaya	Russia	2002, 2006	–	1	1	2	
Kaori Sakamoto	Japan	2022, 2026	–	1	1	2	
Chen Lu	China	1994, 1998	–	–	2	2	

==== Pairs ====
Skater	Nation	Olympics	Gold medal – first place	Silver medal – second place	Bronze medal – third place	Total	Ref.
Irina Rodnina	Soviet Union	1972, 1976, 1980	3	–	–	3	
Artur Dmitriev	Unified Team; Russia	1992, 1994, 1998	2	1	–	3	
Andrée Brunet	France	1924, 1928, 1932	2	–	1	3	
Pierre Brunet	France	1924, 1928, 1932	2		1	3	
Ludmila Belousova	Soviet Union	1964, 1968	2	–	–	2	
Ekaterina Gordeeva	Soviet Union; Russia	1988, 1994	2	–	–	2	
Sergei Grinkov	Soviet Union; Russia	1988, 1994	2	–	–	2	
Oleg Protopopov	Soviet Union	1964, 1968	2	–	–	2	
Alexander Zaitsev	Soviet Union	1976, 1980	2	–	–	2	
Elena Berezhnaya	Russia	1998, 2002	1	1	–	2	
Han Cong	China	2018, 2022	1	1	–	2	
Ludowika Jakobsson	Finland	1920, 1924	1	1	–	2	
Walter Jakobsson	Finland	1920, 1924	1	1	–	2	
Natalia Mishkutenok	Unified Team; Russia	1992, 1994	1	1	–	2	
Anton Sikharulidze	Russia	1998, 2002	1	1	–	2	
Sui Wenjing	China	2018, 2022	1	1	–	2	
Aljona Savchenko	Germany	2010, 2014, 2018	1	–	2	3	
Shen Xue	China	2002, 2006, 2010	1	–	2	3	
Zhao Hongbo	China	2002, 2006, 2010	1		2	3	
Hans-Jürgen Bäumler	Germany	1960, 1964	–	2	–	2	
Marika Kilius	Germany	1960, 1964	–	2	–	2	
Phyllis Johnson (Note: Phyllis Johnson won one silver medal in 1908 with James H. Johnson and one bronze medal in 1920 with Basil Williams.)	Great Britain	1908, 1920	–	1	1	2	
Isabelle Brasseur	Canada	1992, 1994	–	–	2	2	
Lloyd Eisler	Canada	1992, 1994	–	–	2	2	
Manuela Groß	East Germany	1972, 1976	–	–	2	2	
Uwe Kagelmann	East Germany	1972, 1976	–	–	2	2	
László Nagy	Hungary	1952, 1956	–	–	2	2	
Marianna Nagy	Hungary	1952, 1956	–	–	2	2	
Emília Rotter	Hungary	1932, 1936	–	–	2	2	
Robin Szolkowy	Germany	2010, 2014	–	–	2	2	
László Szollás	Hungary	1932, 1936	–	–	2	2	

==== Ice dance ====
Skater	Nation	Olympics	Gold medal – first place	Silver medal – second place	Bronze medal – third place	Total	Ref.
Tessa Virtue	Canada	2010, 2014, 2018	2	1	–	3	
Scott Moir	Canada	2010, 2014, 2018	2	1	–	3	
Guillaume Cizeron	France	2018, 2022, 2026	2	1	–	3	
Oksana Grishuk	Russia	1994, 1998	2	0	–	2	
Evgeny Platov	Russia	1994, 1998	2	0	–	2	
Marina Klimova	Soviet Union; Unified Team	1984, 1992	1	1	1	3	
Sergei Ponomarenko	Soviet Union; Unified Team	1984, 1992	1	1	1	3	
Natalia Bestemianova	Soviet Union	1984, 1988	1	1	–	2	
Andrei Bukin	Soviet Union	1984, 1988	1	1	–	2	
Meryl Davis	United States	2010, 2014	1	1	–	2	
Charlie White	United States	2010, 2014	1	1	–	2	
Gabriella Papadakis	France	2018, 2022	1	1	–	2	
Jayne Torvill	Great Britain	1984, 1994	1	–	1	2	
Christopher Dean	Great Britain	1984, 1994	1	–	1	2	
Marina Anissina	France	1998, 2002	1	–	1	2	
Gwendal Peizerat	France	1998, 2002	1	–	1	2	
Maya Usova	Unified Team; Russia	1992, 1994	–	1	1	2	
Alexander Zhulin	Unified Team; Russia	1992, 1994	–	1	1	2	
Nikita Katsalapov	Russia; ROC	2014, 2022	–	1	1	2	

==== Team event ====
Skater	Nation	Olympics	Gold medal – first place	Silver medal – second place	Bronze medal – third place	Total	Ref.
Madison Chock	United States	2022, 2026	2	–	–	2	
Evan Bates	United States	2022, 2026	2	–	–	2	
Tessa Virtue	Canada	2014, 2018	1	1	–	2	
Scott Moir	Canada	2014, 2018	1	1	–	2	
Meagan Duhamel	Canada	2014, 2018	1	1	–	2	
Eric Radford	Canada	2014, 2018	1	1	–	2	
Kaetlyn Osmond	Canada	2014, 2018	1	1	–	2	
Patrick Chan	Canada	2014, 2018	1	1	–	2	
Nathan Chen	United States	2018, 2022	1	–	1	2	
Alexa Knierim	United States	2018, 2022	1	–	1	2	
Ekaterina Bobrova	Russia; Olympic Athletes from Russia	2014, 2018	1	1	–	2	
Dmitri Soloviev	Russia; Olympic Athletes from Russia	2014, 2018	1	1	–	2	
Nikita Katsalapov	Russia; ROC	2014, 2022	1	–	1	2	
Kaori Sakamoto	Japan	2022, 2026	–	2	–	2	
Yuma Kagiyama	Japan	2022, 2026	–	2	–	2	
Riku Miura	Japan	2022, 2026	–	2	–	2	
Ryuichi Kihara	Japan	2022, 2026	–	2	–	2	

=== Multiple disciplines ===
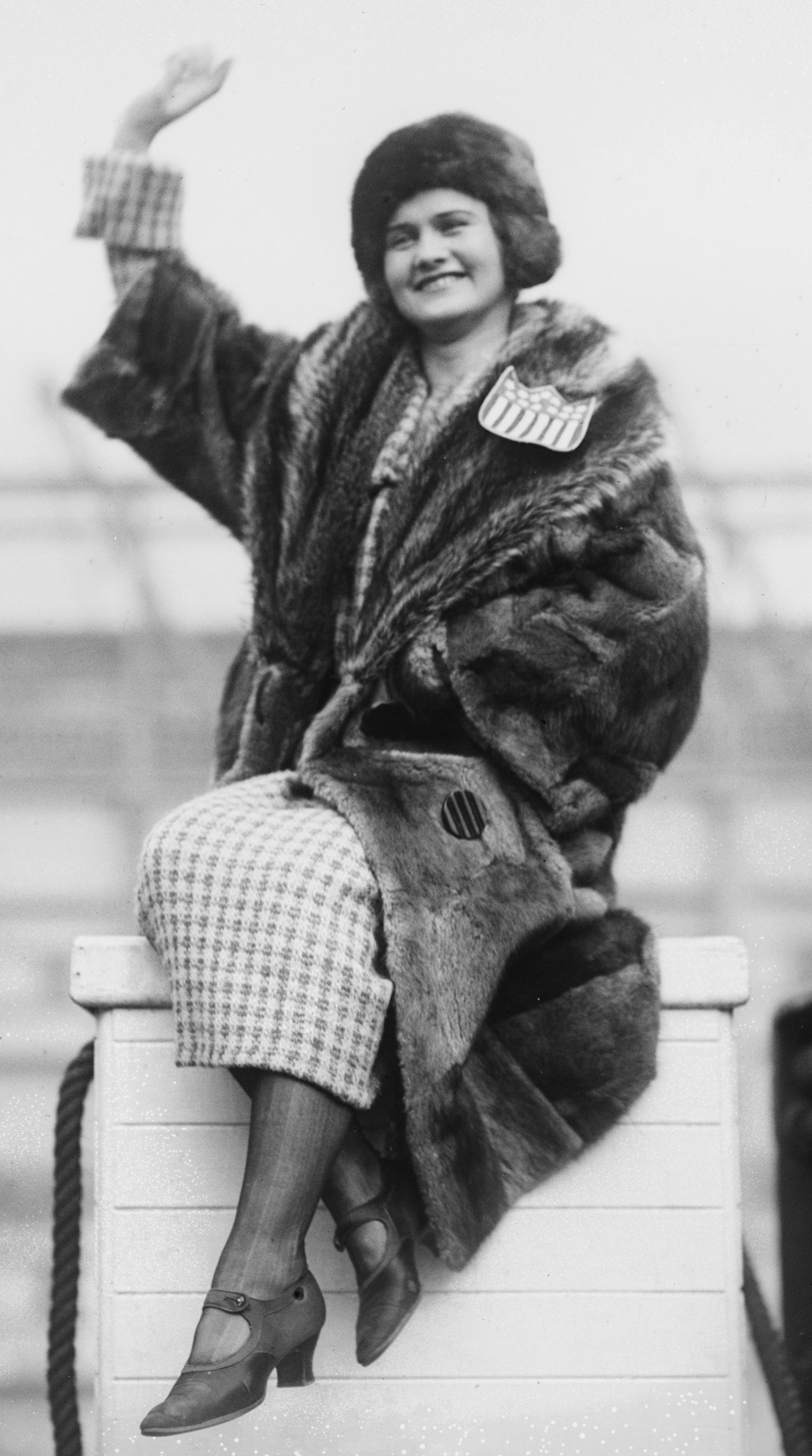
Beatrix Loughran of the United States won two Olympic medals in women's singles and one in pair skating.

Only three skaters have won Olympic medals in multiple figure skating disciplines. In 1908, Madge Syers of Great Britain became the first skater to medal in multiple figure skating disciplines at a single Olympics. The only skater to match this feat was Ernst Baier of Germany in 1936. Beatrix Loughran of the United States won a silver medal in women's singles at the 1924 Winter Olympics, a bronze medal in women's singles at the 1928 Winter Olympics, and a silver medal in pair skating at the 1932 Winter Olympics.

Skaters who have won Olympic medals in multiple disciplines
Skater	Nation	Events	Olympics	Gold medal – first place	Silver medal – second place	Bronze medal – third place	Total	Ref.
Ernst Baier	Germany	Men's singles	1936	–	1	–	2	
Ernst Baier	Germany	Pairs	1936	1	–	–	2	
Madge Syers	Great Britain	Women's singles	1908	1	–	–	2	
Madge Syers	Great Britain	Pairs	1908	–	–	1	2	
Beatrix Loughran	United States	Women's singles	1924, 1928	–	1	1	3	
Beatrix Loughran	United States	Pairs	1932	–	1	–	3	

== Total medal count by nation ==
- Countries or entities that can no longer participate are indicated in italics with a dagger (†).

=== Men's singles ===
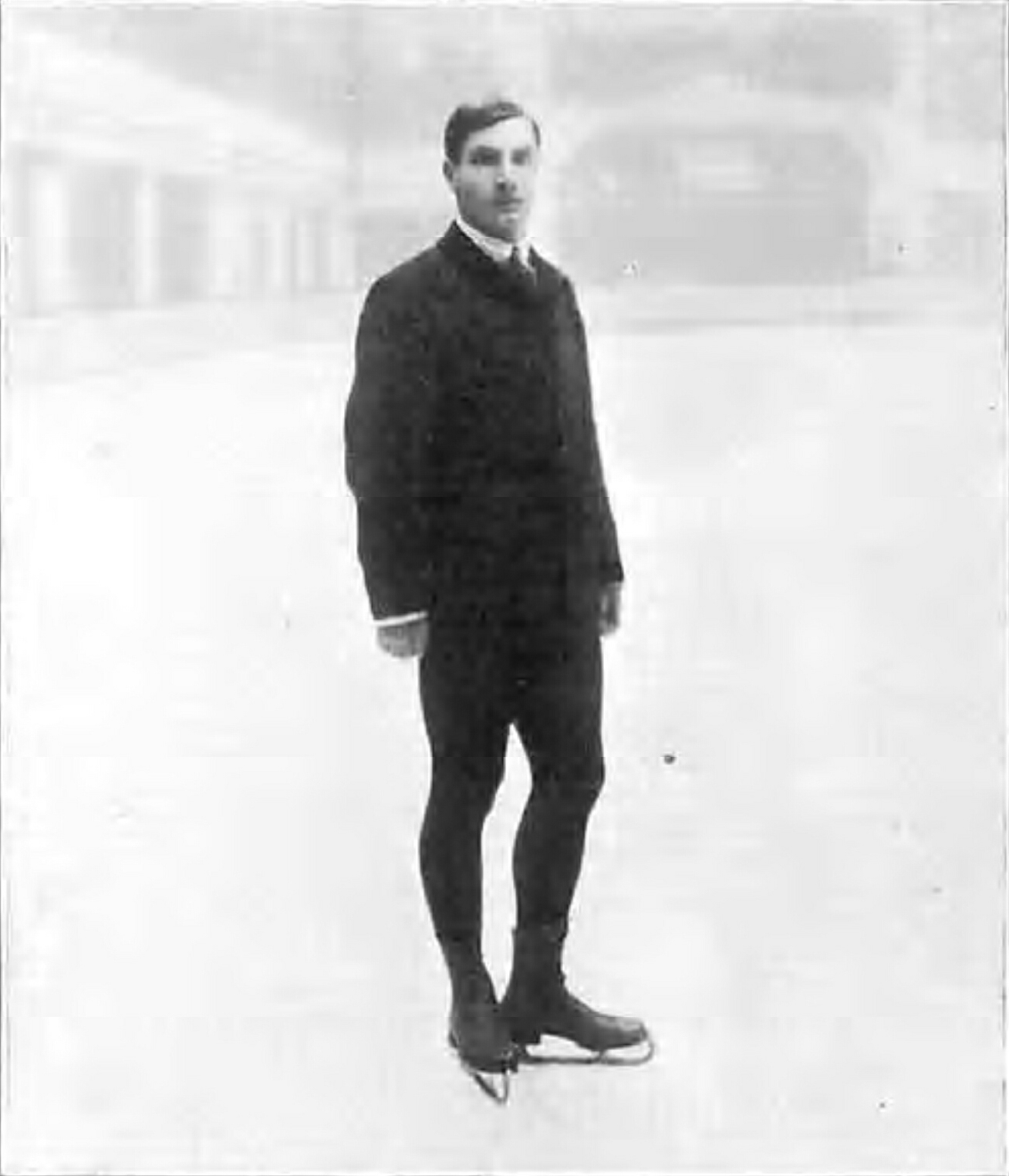
Ulrich Salchow of Sweden, who created the Salchow jump, was the first Olympic champion in men's figure skating.

Number of Olympic medals in men's singles by nation
Rank	Nation	Gold	Silver	Bronze	Total
1	United States	8	3	5	16
2	Sweden	4	2	1	7
3	Russia †	4	2	0	6
4	Austria	3	3	2	8
5	Japan	2	3	3	8
6	Great Britain	2	0	0	2
7	Czechoslovakia †	1	1	2	4
8	Kazakhstan	1	0	1	2
9	Unified Team †	1	0	0	1
9	United Team of Germany †	1	0	0	1
11	Canada	0	5	4	9
12	Soviet Union †	0	2	1	3
12	Switzerland	0	2	1	3
14	France	0	1	4	5
15	Norway	0	1	1	2
16	East Germany †	0	1	0	1
16	Germany	0	1	0	1
18	Belgium	0	0	1	1
18	Spain	0	0	1	1
Totals (19 entries)		27	27	27	81

=== Women's singles ===
Number of Olympic medals in women's singles by nation
Rank	Nation	Gold	Silver	Bronze	Total
1	United States	8	8	8	24
2	East Germany †	3	1	1	5
3	Norway	3	0	0	3
4	Austria	2	4	1	7
5	Great Britain	2	1	3	6
6	Japan	1	3	2	6
7	Canada	1	2	3	6
8	Netherlands	1	2	0	3
9	Russia †	1	1	1	3
9	Sweden	1	1	1	3
11	Olympic Athletes from Russia †	1	1	0	2
11	ROC †	1	1	0	2
11	South Korea	1	1	0	2
14	Ukraine	1	0	0	1
15	Germany	0	1	0	1
16	China	0	0	2	2
17	Czechoslovakia †	0	0	1	1
17	France	0	0	1	1
17	Italy	0	0	1	1
17	Soviet Union †	0	0	1	1
17	West Germany †	0	0	1	1
Totals (21 entries)		27	27	27	81

=== Pairs ===
Number of Olympic medals in pair skating by nation
Rank	Nation	Gold	Silver	Bronze	Total
1	Soviet Union †	7	4	1	12
2	Russia †	5	3	0	8
3	Germany	4	0	4	8
4	China	2	3	2	7
5	Canada	2	2	4	8
6	Austria	2	2	1	5
7	France	2	0	1	3
8	Finland	1	1	0	2
8	Unified Team †	1	1	0	2
10	Belgium	1	0	0	1
10	Japan	1	0	0	1
12	United States	0	3	3	6
13	United Team of Germany †	0	2	0	2
14	Hungary	0	1	4	5
15	East Germany †	0	1	3	4
16	Great Britain	0	1	2	3
17	ROC †	0	1	1	2
18	Georgia	0	1	0	1
18	Norway	0	1	0	1
20	West Germany †	0	0	1	1
Totals (20 entries)		28	27	27	82

=== Ice dance ===
Number of Olympic medals in ice dance by nation
Rank	Nation	Gold	Silver	Bronze	Total
1	Russia †	3	3	2	8
1	Soviet Union †	3	3	2	8
3	France	3	2	1	6
4	Canada	2	1	2	5
5	United States	1	3	3	7
6	Great Britain	1	0	1	2
6	Unified Team †	1	0	1	2
8	Hungary	0	1	0	1
8	ROC †	0	1	0	1
10	Italy	0	0	1	1
10	Ukraine	0	0	1	1
Totals (11 entries)		14	14	14	42

=== Team event ===
Number of Olympic medals in the figure skating team event by nation
Rank	Nation	Gold	Silver	Bronze	Total
1	United States	2	0	2	4
2	Canada	1	1	0	2
3	Russia †	1	0	0	1
4	Japan	0	2	0	2
5	Olympic Athletes from Russia †	0	1	0	1
6	Italy	0	0	1	1
6	ROC †	0	0	1	1
Totals (7 entries)		4	4	4	12

=== Overall ===
Total number of Olympic medals by nation
Rank	Nation	Gold	Silver	Bronze	Total
1	United States	19	17	21	57
2	Russia †	15	9	3	27
3	Soviet Union †	10	9	5	24
4	Austria	7	9	4	20
5	Canada	6	11	13	30
6	France	5	3	7	15
6	Great Britain	5	3	7	15
8	Sweden	5	3	2	10
9	Japan	4	8	5	17
10	Germany	4	2	4	10
11	East Germany †	3	3	4	10
12	Norway	3	2	1	6
13	Unified Team †	3	1	1	5
14	China	2	3	4	9
15	ROC †	1	3	2	6
16	Netherlands	1	2	0	3
16	Olympic Athletes from Russia †	1	2	0	3
16	United Team of Germany †	1	2	0	3
19	Czechoslovakia †	1	1	3	5
20	Finland	1	1	0	2
20	South Korea	1	1	0	2
22	Belgium	1	0	1	2
22	Kazakhstan	1	0	1	2
22	Ukraine	1	0	1	2
25	Hungary	0	2	4	6
26	Switzerland	0	2	1	3
27	Georgia	0	1	0	1
28	Italy	0	0	3	3
29	West Germany †	0	0	2	2
30	Spain	0	0	1	1
Totals (30 entries)		101	100	100	301

== See also ==
- Figure skating at the Olympic Games
