= 1931 European Figure Skating Championships =

Figure skating competition

1931 European Championships
- Type: ISU Championship
- Season: 1930–31
- Location: Vienna, Austria

Champions
- Men's singles: (Austria) Karl Schäfer
- Ladies' singles: (Norway) Sonja Henie
- Pairs: (Kingdom of Hungary) Olga Orgonista / Sándor Szalay
- Previous: 1930 European Championships
- Next: 1932 European Championships

The 1931 European Figure Skating Championships were held in Vienna, Austria. Elite senior-level figure skaters from European ISU member nations competed for the title of European Champion in the disciplines of men's singles, ladies' singles, and pair skating.

== Results ==
=== Men ===
Rank	Name	Places
1	(Austria) Karl Schäfer	
2	(Germany) Ernst Baier	
3	(Austria) Hugo Distler	
4	(Kingdom of Hungary) Marcell Vadas	21
5	(Austria) Otto Hartmann	
6	(Austria) Rudolf Zettelmann	

=== Ladies ===
Rank	Name	Places
1	(Norway) Sonja Henie	
2	(Austria) Fritzi Burger	
3	(Austria) Hilde Holovsky	
4	(Sweden) Vivi-Anne Hultén	
5	(Austria) Lilly Weiler	
6	(Belgium) Yvonne de Ligne-Geurts	
7	(Austria) Ilse Hornung	
8	(Germany) Else Flebbe	
9	(Kingdom of Italy) Reneé Volpato	
10	(Kingdom of Hungary) Piroska Levitzky	

=== Pairs ===
Rank	Name	Places
1	(Kingdom of Hungary) Olga Orgonista / Sándor Szalay	8
2	(Kingdom of Hungary) Emília Rotter / László Szollás	14.5
3	(Austria) Lilly Gaillard / Willy Petter	
