= Figure skating at the 1932 Winter Olympics – Ladies' singles =

Figure skating at the Olympics

Ladies' singles at the III Olympic Winter Games
- Venue: Herb Brooks Arena
- Dates: 9-10 February 1932
- Competitors: 15 from 7 nations

Medalists
1st place, gold medalist(s)		Sonja Henie; Norway
2nd place, silver medalist(s)		Fritzi Burger; Austria
3rd place, bronze medalist(s)		Maribel Vinson; United States

The ladies' individual skating event was held as part of the figure skating at the 1932 Winter Olympics. It was the fifth appearance of the event, which had previously been held twice at the Summer Olympics in 1908 and 1920 as well as at the Winter Games in 1924 and 1928. The competition was held on Tuesday 9 February and on Wednesday 10 February 1932. Fifteen figure skaters from seven nations competed.

== Results ==
Sonja Henie successfully defended her 1928 title with Austrian Fritzi Burger finishing in second place again.

The points and score are given as shown in the official Olympic report, placing Colledge in eighth, Phillips in ninth, Davis in twelfth, and Fisher in 13th.

Rank	Name	Nation	CF	FS	Total points	Place
1	Sonja Henie	Norway	1	1	2302.5	7
2	Fritzi Burger	Austria	2	2	2167.1	18
3	Maribel Vinson	United States	3	3	2158.8	23
4	Constance Wilson-Samuel	Canada	4	5	2129.5	28
5	Vivi-Anne Hultén	Sweden	5	4	2129.5	29
6	Yvonne de Ligne	Belgium	6	6	1942.5	45
7	Megan Taylor	Great Britain	7	7	1911.8	55
8	Cecilia Colledge	Great Britain	8	10	1851.6	64
9	Mollie Phillips	Great Britain	9	9	1864.7	63
10	Joan Dix	Great Britain	11	11	1833.6	75
11	Margaret Bennett	United States	12	8	1826.8	75
12	Suzanne Davis	United States	10	14	1780.4	83
13	Elizabeth Fisher	Canada	13	12	1801.0	82
14	Louise Weigel	United States	14	13	1769.4	92
15	Mary Littlejohn	Canada	15	15	1711.6	101

Referee:

- (United States) Joel B. Liberman

Judges:

- (Norway) Yngvar Bryn
- (United Kingdom) Herbert J. Clarke
- (Austria) Hans Grünauer
- (Finland) Walter Jakobsson
- (Canada) J. Cecil McDougall
- (France) Georges Torchon
- (United States) Charles M. Rotch
