= 1932 World Figure Skating Championships =

Annual figure skating competition held in 1932

- Type: ISU Championship
- Date: February 17 – 20
- Season: 1932
- Location: Montreal, Quebec, Canada
- Host: The Figure Skating Department of Canada
- Venue: Montreal Winter Club; Montreal Forum

Champions
- Men's singles: (Austria) Karl Schäfer
- Ladies' singles: (Norway) Sonja Henie
- Pairs: (France) Andrée Brunet / Pierre Brunet
- Previous: 1931 World Championships
- Next: 1933 World Championships

The 1932 World Figure Skating Championships were the annual figure skating competition sanctioned by the International Skating Union in which figure skaters competed for the title of World Champion. The competitions took place from February 17 to 20 in Montreal, Quebec, Canada. The compulsory figures competition took place at the Montreal Winter Club, while the free skating was held at the city's landmark Montreal Forum.

These were the first figure skating world championships in Canada, a choice of venue that corresponded with the hosting of the 1932 Winter Olympics in adjacent Lake Placid, New York. It was the third year in a row that all competitions were held at the same location and at the same time, and the first time that Japanese skaters participated.

== Medal table ==
* Host nation (Canada)

Rank	Nation	Gold	Silver	Bronze	Total
1	Austria	1	1	0	2
2	France	1	0	0	1
2	Norway	1	0	0	1
4	Canada*	0	1	1	2
5	Hungary	0	1	0	1
6	Germany	0	0	1	1
6	United States	0	0	1	1
Totals (7 entries)		3	3	3	9

== Results ==
=== Men ===
Rank	Name	Places
1	(Austria) Karl Schäfer	7
2	(Canada) Montgomery Wilson	14
3	(Germany) Ernst Baier	25
4	(Finland) Markus Nikkanen	30
5	(United States) Roger Turner	30
6	(United States) James Maden	41
7	(Japan) Kazuyoshi Oimatsu	53
8	(Japan) Ryoichi Obitani	55
9	(United States) Robin Lee	60

Judges:

- (Norway) Yngvar Bryn
- (United Kingdom) Herbert Clarke
- (Austria) Hans Günauer
- (Finland) Walter Jakobsson
- (United States) J. B. Liberman
- (Canada) Norman Scott
- (France) Georges Torchon

=== Ladies ===
Rank	Name	Places
1	(Norway) Sonja Henie	7
2	(Austria) Fritzi Burger	22
3	(Canada) Constance Samuel	24
4	(United States) Maribel Vinson	26
5	(Sweden) Vivi-Anne Hultén	27
6	(Belgium) Yvonne de Ligne-Geurts	45
7	(United Kingdom) Megan Taylor	51
8	(United Kingdom) Cecilia Colledge	60
9	(United Kingdom) Mollie Phillips	67
10	(United Kingdom) Joan Dix	72
11	(United States) Suzanne Davis	71
12	(United States) Margaret Bennet	82
13	(Canada) Elizabeth Fisher	83
14	(Canada) Mary Littlejohn	98

Judges:

- (Norway) Yngvar Bryn
- (United Kingdom) Herbert Clarke
- (Austria) Hans Günauer
- (Finland) Walter Jakobsson
- (United States) J. B. Liberman
- (Canada) Norman Scott
- (France) Georges Torchon

=== Pairs ===
Rank	Name	Places
1	(France) Andrée Brunet / Pierre Brunet	9
2	(Kingdom of Hungary) Emília Rotter / László Szollás	16
3	(United States) Beatrix Loughran / Sherwin Badger	22.5
4	(Kingdom of Hungary) Olga Orgonista / Sándor Szalay	24
5	(Canada) Frances Claudet / Chauncey Bangs	36.5
6	(Canada) Constance Samuel / Montgomery Wilson	40
7	(Canada) Maude Smith / Jack Eastwood	49
8	(United States) Theresa Weld / Nathaniel Niles	58.5
9	(Canada) Isobel Rogers / Melville Rogers	59.5

Judges:

- (Norway) Yngvar Bryn
- (Austria) Hans Günauer
- (Finland) Walter Jakobsson
- (United States) J. B. Liberman
- (Kingdom of Hungary) Jenő Minich
- (Canada) Norman Scott
- (France) Georges Torchon
