= 1931 World Figure Skating Championships =

Annual figure skating competition held in 1931

- Type: ISU Championship
- Date: February 28 – March 1
- Season: 1931
- Location: Berlin, Germany

Champions
- Men's singles: (Austria) Karl Schäfer
- Ladies' singles: (Norway) Sonja Henie
- Pairs: (Kingdom of Hungary) Emília Rotter / László Szollás
- Previous: 1930 World Championships
- Next: 1932 World Championships

The World Figure Skating Championships is an annual figure skating competition sanctioned by the International Skating Union in which figure skaters compete for the title of World Champion.

The competitions took place from February 28 to March 1 in Berlin, Germany. It was the second year when all competitions were held at the same location and the same time, but the first time in Europe.

== Medal table ==
* Host nation (Germany)

Rank	Nation	Gold	Silver	Bronze	Total
1	Austria	1	1	2	4
2	Hungary	1	1	0	2
3	Norway	1	0	0	1
4	United States	0	1	0	1
5	Germany*	0	0	1	1
Totals (5 entries)		3	3	3	9

== Results ==
=== Men ===
Rank	Name	Age	Total	Points	Places
1	(Austria) Karl Schäfer	21	2563.26	366.18	8
2	(United States) Roger Turner	29	2362.60	337.51	26
3	(Germany) Ernst Baier	26	2310.70	330.10	33
4	(Austria) Hugo Distler		2286.97	326.71	33
5	(Germany) Leopold Maier-Labergo	23	2264.78	323.54	41
6	(Kingdom of Hungary) Marcell Vadas		2213.54	316.22	46
7	(Finland) Marcus Nikkanen	27	2217.97	316.85	48
8	(Germany) Herbert Haertel		2170.77	310.11	55
9	(France) Pierre Brunet	28	2100.07	300.01	59
10	(Czechoslovakia) Rudolf Pražnovský		2173.50	310.50	60
11	(United States) George Hill	23	2072.00	296.00	76
12	(Czechoslovakia) Josef Slíva	32	2138.29	305.47	73
13	(Germany) Theo Lass		2035.88	290.84	79

- Referee: (Sweden) Ulrich Salchow

Judges:

- (United Kingdom) Herbert Clarke
- (Austria) Ludwig Fänner
- (United States) Walter Hildburgh
- (Finland) Walter Jakobsson
- (Kingdom of Hungary) Jenő Minich
- (Germany) Ludwig Niedermayer
- (Czechoslovakia) H. Pika

=== Ladies ===
Rank	Name	Age	CF	FS	Total	Points	Places
1	(Norway) Sonja Henie	18	1	1	2545.90	363.70	8
2	(Austria) Hilde Holovsky	13	2	2	2688.77	384.11	17
3	(Austria) Fritzi Burger	20	3	3	2386.30	340.90	21
4	(United States) Maribel Vinson	19	4	5	2333.24	333.24	26
5	(Sweden) Vivi-Anne Hultén	19	5	4	2244.76	320.68	35
6	(Norway) Edel Randem	20	6	7	2061.85	294.55	47
7	(Norway) Nanna Egedius	17	7	8	2068.64	295.52	48
8	(Belgium) Yvonne de Ligne-Geurts	23	8	6	2056.04	293.72	50
9	(Norway) Randi Gulliksen		9	9	1884.26	269.18	63

- (United Kingdom) Referee: Herbert Clarke

Judges:

- (Sweden) August Anderberg
- (Czechoslovakia) Erich Bartel
- (Germany) Kurt Dannenberg
- (Austria) Hans Grünauer
- (United States) Walter Hildburgh
- (Norway) Oscar R. Kolderup
- (United Kingdom) S. Wallwork

=== Pairs ===
Rank	Name	Age	Total	Points	Places
1	(Kingdom of Hungary) Emília Rotter / László Szollás	24/23	74.0	10.57	13.5
2	(Kingdom of Hungary) Olga Orgonista / Sándor Szalay	29/37	73.4	10.49	14.5
3	(Austria) Idi Papez / Karl Zwack	/25	70.7	10.10	23.5
4	(Austria) Lilly Gaillard-Scholz / Willy Petter	27/	69.7	9.96	27.5
5	(United States) Maribel Vinson / George Hill	19/23	64.0	9.14	39
6	(Czechoslovakia) Else Hoppe / Oscar Hoppe	/45	62.6	8.94	39
7	(Germany) Ilse Gaste / Ernst Gaste	24/32	62.7	8.96	45
8	(Austria) Hansi Kast / Otto Kaiser	/29	60.8	8.70	50
9	(Germany) Elisabeth Böckel / Otto Hayek		49.9	7.13	63

- Referee: (Germany) Hans Pfeifer

Judges:

- (Czechoslovakia) Erich Bartel
- (Austria) J. Edhoffer
- (United States) Walter Hildburgh
- (Finland) Walter Jakobsson
- (Kingdom of Hungary) Jenő Minich
- (Germany) C. Schulze
- (United Kingdom) S. Wallwork
