= 1930 European Figure Skating Championships =

Figure skating competition

1930 European Championships
- Type: ISU Championship
- Season: 1929–30
- Location: Berlin, Germany

Champions
- Men's singles: (Austria) Karl Schäfer
- Ladies' singles: (Austria) Fritzi Burger
- Pairs: (Kingdom of Hungary) Olga Orgonista / Sándor Szalay
- Previous: 1929 European Championships
- Next: 1931 European Championships

The 1930 European Figure Skating Championships were held in Berlin, Germany. Elite senior-level figure skaters from European ISU member nations competed for the title of European Champion in the disciplines of men's singles, for the first time ladies' singles, and pair skating.

The men's competition was skated twice, as the results of the first competition were nullified due to two issues: the referee was not certified by the ISU, and the Yugoslavian judge was likewise not certified but appeared under the name of an official judge. The winner of the initial competition was Josef Slíva, who did not complete the second competition.

== Results ==
=== Men ===
Rank	Name	Places
1	(Austria) Karl Schäfer	
2	(Czechoslovakia) Otto Gold	
3	(Finland) Marcus Nikkanen	
4	(Germany) Herbert Haertel	
5	(Germany) Ernst Baier	
6	(Austria) Josef Bernhauser	
7	(Czechoslovakia) Rudolf Praznowski	
8	(Germany) Benno Wellmann	
9	(Czechoslovakia) Otto Zappe	

=== Ladies ===
Rank	Name	Places
1	(Austria) Fritzi Burger	
2	(Austria) Ilse Hornung	
3	(Sweden) Vivi-Anne Hultén	
4	(Austria) Lilly Weiler	
5	(Austria) Gerda Hornung	
6	(Norway) Edel Randem	
7	(Belgium) Yvonne de Ligne-Geurts	
8	(United Kingdom) Kathleen Shaw	
9	(Switzerland) Lilly Kuhn	

=== Pairs ===
Rank	Name	Places
1	(Kingdom of Hungary) Olga Orgonista / Sándor Szalay	6
2	(Kingdom of Hungary) Emília Rotter / László Szollás	15
3	(Austria) Gisela Hochhaltinger / Otto Preißecker	
4	(Kingdom of Hungary) Ilona Philipovits / Rudolf Dillinger	21
5	(Austria) Idi Papez / Karl Zwack	
6	(Austria) Ridi Jauernik / Pepo Jauernik	
7	(Czechoslovakia) Else Hoppe / Oscar Hoppe	
