= Josef Slíva =

Czech figure skater

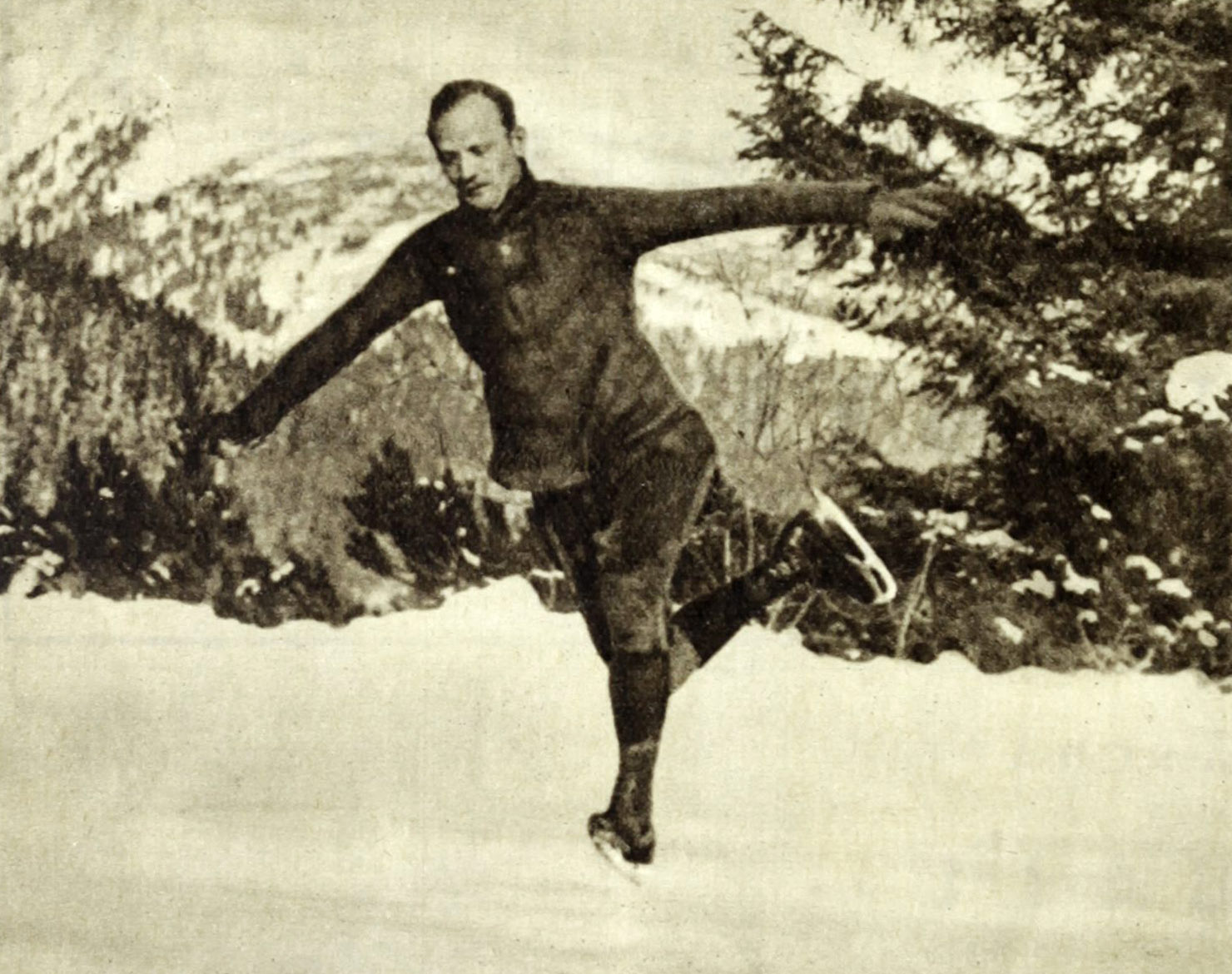
- Slíva in 1930

Personal information
- Full name: Josef Slíva
- Born: November 25, 1898 Třinec, Austria-Hungary

Figure skating career
- Country: Czechoslovakia

Josef Slíva (born November 25, 1898, date of death unknown) was a Czech figure skater who competed for Czechoslovakia in the 1924 Winter Olympics and in the 1928 Winter Olympics. He was a nine-time Czechoslovak national champion.

In 1924, he finished fourth in the singles event. Four years later, he finished fifth in the singles competition at the St. Moritz Games.

In 1930, he was initially declared the winner of the European Championships; however, the results were nullified because two of the officials were not certified, and the event was ordered to be redone. Slíva did not complete the second competition. His last international competition was the 1931 World Championships, where he placed twelfth.

== Results ==
Event	1924	1925	1926	1927	1928	1929	1930	1931	1932
Winter Olympic Games	4th				5th				
World Championships		5th	5th					12th	
Czechoslovak Championships	1st	1st	1st	1st	1st	1st	1st	1st	1st
