= Otto Gold =

Personal information
- Born: 18 May 1909 Prague, Czechoslovakia
- Died: 7 April 1977 (aged 67) Toronto, Canada

Figure skating career
- Country: Czechoslovakia
Medal record
Representing Czech Republic
Men's figure skating
European Championships
Silver medal – second place	1930 Berlin	Men

Otto Gold (18 May 1909 – 7 April 1977) was a Czechoslovak figure skater and coach.

Gold, who competed in men's singles, won the silver medal at the 1930 European Figure Skating Championships in Berlin.

He began coaching in 1932. He coached Sonia Henie at the 1935 World Figure Skating Championships.

In 1937, he moved to Ontario, Canada, where he began a four-decade coaching career at the Minto Skating Club. He was one of the first coaches of 1948 Olympic champion Barbara Ann Scott, and also worked in Vancouver, Connecticut and Lake Placid. He has been recognised for raising the level of figure skating in North America.

In April 1977, Gold died in a Toronto hospital from injuries caused by a fire at his apartment.

His daughter, Frances Gold Lynn, was a figure skater who placed fourth at the 1962 U.S. Figure Skating Championships and later became a coach. He was inducted into the Canadian Figure Skating Hall of Fame in its inaugural class of 1990.

== Competitive highlights ==
Event	1928	1929	1930
European Championships			2nd
Czechoslovak Championships	3rd		
