= Edel Randem =

Norwegian figure skater

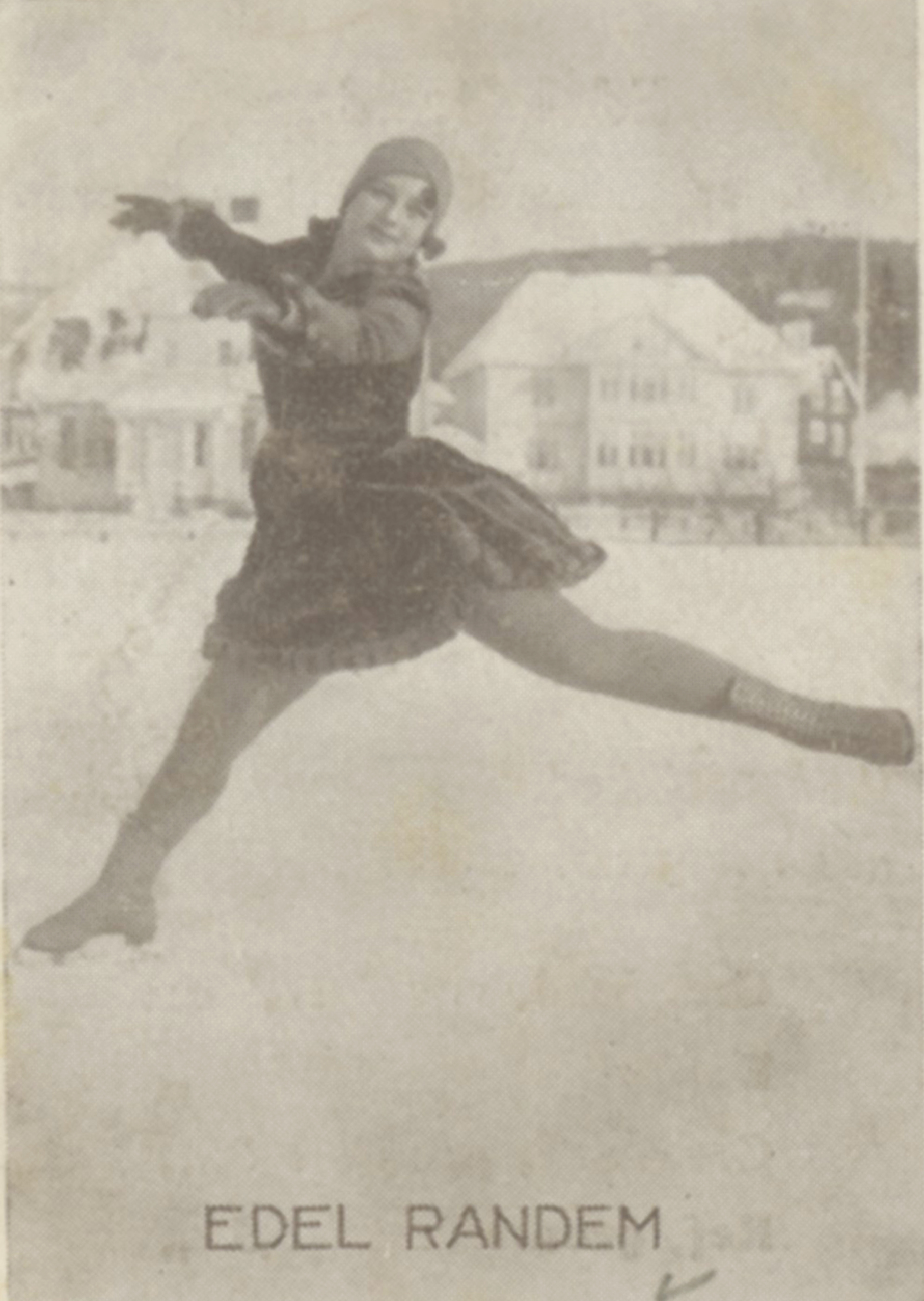

Personal information
- Full name: Edel Signe Randem
- Born: 11 September 1910 Oslo
- Died: 26 November 2001 (aged 91) Stabekk

Figure skating career
- Country: Norway
- Skating club: Oslo Skøiteklub

Edel Signe Randem (married name: Uvland; born 11 September 1910 in Oslo – died 26 November 2001 in Stabekk) was a Norwegian figure skater.

She competed at the 1931 World Figure Skating Championships, where she finished sixth. She also finished sixth at the 1930 European Figure Skating Championships, and she participated at the 1928 Winter Olympics, where she finished 13th.

Randem won the Norwegian Figure Skating Championships in 1930 and 1931.

== Results ==
| Event | 1928 | 1929 | 1930 | 1931 |
|---|---|---|---|---|
| Winter Olympic Games | 13th | | | |
| World Championships | | | | 6th |
| European Championships | | | 6th | |
| Norwegian Championships | | | 1st | 1st |
