= Leopold Maier-Labergo =

German figure skater (1907–1939)

Leopold Maier-Labergo (3 March 1907 – 9 May 1939) was a German figure skater. He was born in Salzburg, Austria.

Maier-Labergo was a three-time German men's champion in figure skating between 1930 and 1942. He came in fifth place at the 1931 World Championships, but never participated in the Olympics or the European Championships. At club level, he represented Münchner EV (based in Munich), where his coach was Ludwig Niedermayer.

After Maier-Labergo's amateur career he became a professional skater and skating coach in Winnipeg, Manitoba, Canada, where he was known as Leopold Labergo. One of his students was Mary Rose Thacker, a future Canadian and North American champion, while others included Fraser Sweatman and Audrey Garland, who skated for Canada at the 1936 Winter Olympics. A graduate of the Ludwig-Maximilians-Universität München in music, he was an accomplished pianist who taught music, and gave occasional recitals on CKY-FM. Maier-Labergo died in Winnipeg in 1939, aged 32, at the Misericordia Health Centre. His death came after a short illness, and was unexpected.

== Competitive highlights in figure skating ==
Event	1930	1931	1932
World Championships		5	
German Championships	1	1	1
