= Hilde Holovsky =

Austrian figure skater

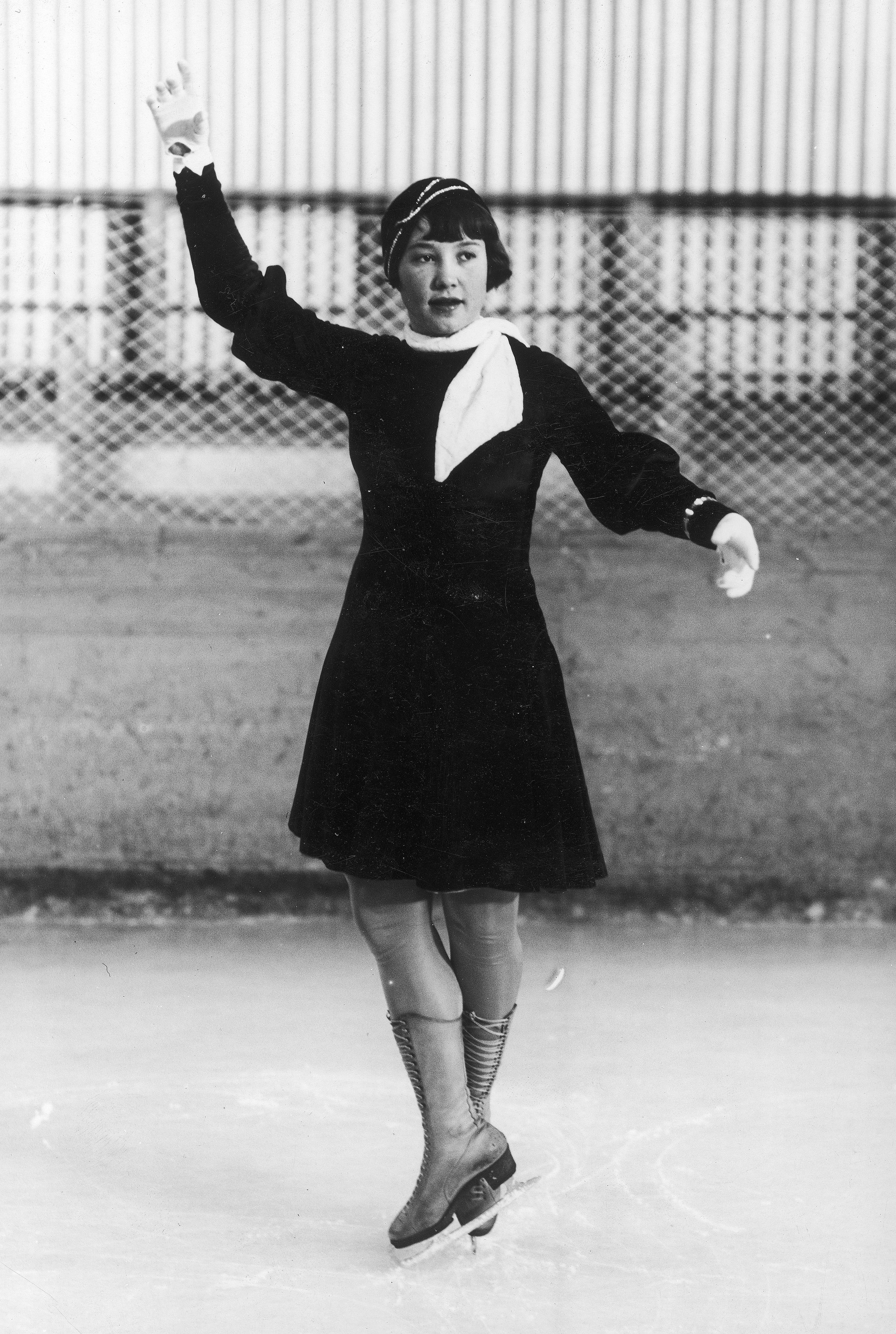
- Holovsky at the 1933 World Championships

Personal information
- Born: 29 April 1917 Vienna, Austria-Hungary
- Died: 3 July 1933 (aged 16) Vienna, Austria

Figure skating career
- Country: Austria
Medal record
Representing Austria
Figure skating: Ladies' singles
World Championships
Bronze medal – third place	1933 Stockholm	Ladies' singles
Silver medal – second place	1931 Berlin	Ladies' singles
European Championships
Bronze medal – third place	1931 St. Moritz	Ladies' singles

Hilde Holovsky (29 April 1917 – 3 July 1933) was an Austrian figure skater. She was the 1931 World silver medalist, the 1933 World bronze medalist, and the 1931 European bronze medalist. At the 1931 World Championships, she was only 13 years old and finished second to Sonja Henie. Holovsky did not compete at the 1932 Winter Olympics or 1932 World Championships because her family could not afford to send her to North America, where both events took place.

Holovsky also competed in speed skating. In 1932, she set the Austrian record for ladies in the 500 meters. She died suddenly of appendicitis in July 1933.

== Competitive highlights ==
International
Event	1931	1932	1933
World Championships	2nd		3rd
European Championships	3rd	4th	4th
National
Austrian Championships		1st	1st
