= Fritzi Burger =

Austrian figure skater

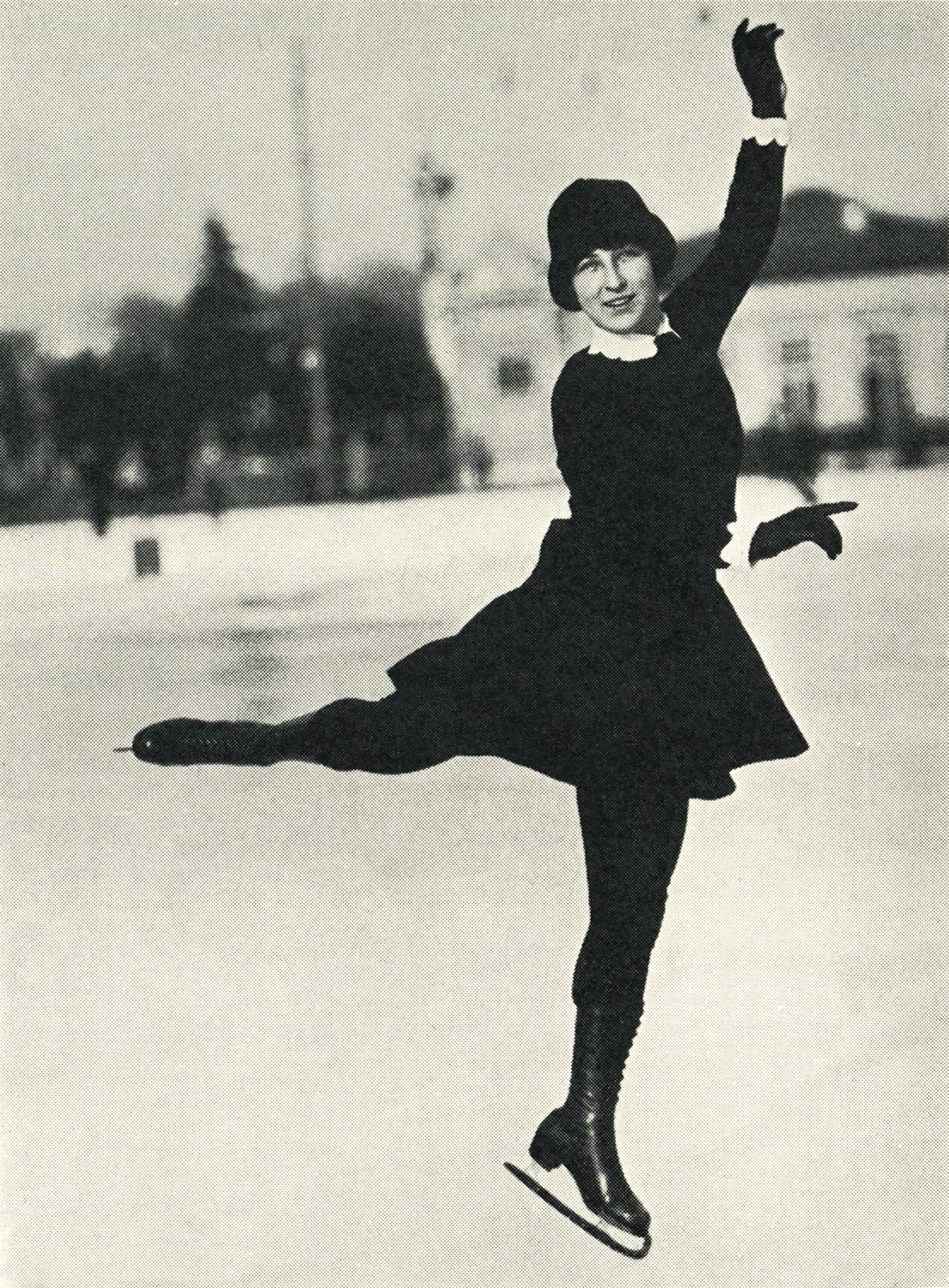

Personal information
- Full name: Friederike Burger
- Born: 6 June 1910 Vienna, Austria-Hungary
- Died: 16 February 1999 (aged 88) Bad Gastein, Austria

Figure skating career
- Country: Austria
- Retired: 1934
Medal record
Representing Austria
Figure skating: Ladies' singles
Olympic Games
Silver medal – second place	1932 Lake Placid	Ladies' singles
Silver medal – second place	1928 St. Moritz	Ladies' singles
World Championships
Silver medal – second place	1929 Budapest	Ladies' singles
Silver medal – second place	1932 Montreal	Ladies' singles
Bronze medal – third place	1928 London	Ladies' singles
Bronze medal – third place	1931 Berlin	Ladies' singles
European Championships
Gold medal – first place	1930 Vienna	Ladies' singles
Silver medal – second place	1932 Paris	Ladies' singles
Silver medal – second place	1931 St. Moritz	Ladies' singles
Bronze medal – third place	1933 London	Ladies' singles

Friederike "Fritzi" Burger (6 June 1910 – 16 February 1999) was an Austrian figure skater. She was a two-time Olympic silver medalist (1928, 1932), a four-time World medalist (silver in 1929 and 1932, bronze in 1928 and 1931), the 1930 European champion, and a four-time Austrian national champion (1928–1931).

== Life and career ==
Burger was born on 6 June 1910 in Vienna. Her family was Jewish.

Burger was the Austrian national champion from 1928 to 1931. She won the first-ever contested European Championships, held in 1930. Sonja Henie, who held a monopoly in women's figure skating at the time, was not present at this championship. She placed second behind Henie at the 1928 and 1932 Winter Olympics and earned bronze medals at the 1929 World Championships, behind Henie and Maribel Vinson of the U.S., and at the 1931 World Championships, behind Henie and Hilde Holovsky from Austria.

After the 1932 Olympics, Burger ended her skating career and went to London, where in 1935 she married Shinkichi Nishikawa, a grandson of the Japanese pearl tycoon Kōkichi Mikimoto. She returned with her husband to Vienna, where she gave birth to her son in the summer of 1937, just before the Anschluss (annexation of Austria by Nazi Germany). She, her husband and her son moved to London in 1938 and a few years later moved to Tokyo, Japan, where Nishikawa was from.

In the 1990s, living in the United States, Burger was interviewed for several documentaries on the history of figure skating. She joked in a 1994 interview, "I had two husbands. [Sonja Henie] even beat me at that. She had three."

Burger died on 16 February 1999 in Bad Gastein, Austria.

== Results ==
International
Event	1927	1928	1929	1930	1931	1932	1933	1934
Winter Olympics		2nd				2nd		
World Championships		3rd	2nd		3rd	2nd		
European Championships				1st	2nd	2nd	3rd	
National
Austrian Championships	3rd	1st	1st	1st	1st	2nd		3rd

== See also ==
- List of select Jewish figure skaters

== Book ==
- Carol Bergman (1999). Searching for Fritzi. Mediacs. ISBN 0-9673134-0-6.
