= Ilse Hornung =

Austrian figure skater

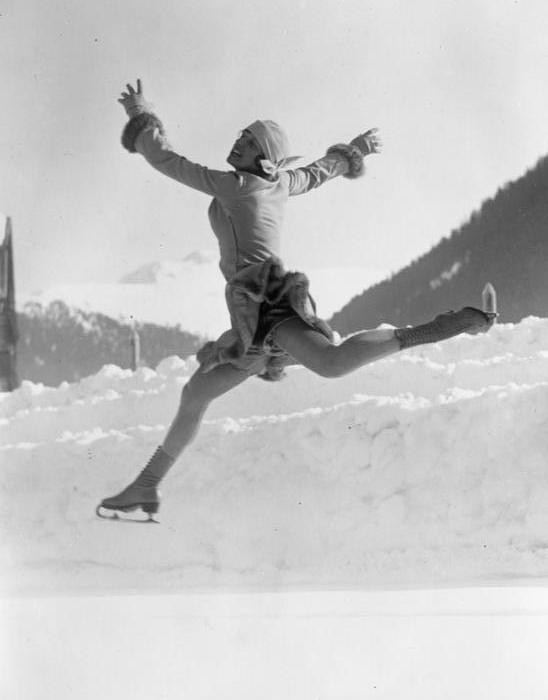
- Hornung in December 1932

Personal information
- Other names: Ilse Bietak
- Born: 10 April 1908
- Died: 22 March 1994 (aged 85) Vienna, Austria

Figure skating career
- Country: Austria
- Retired: c. 1931

Ilse Hornung (later Bietak; 10 April 1908 – 22 March 1994) was an Austrian figure skater who competed in ladies' singles. She finished eighth at the 1928 Winter Olympics and won the silver medal at the 1930 European Championships. She was the mother of Austrian figure skater Wilhelm Bietak.

== Results ==
International
Event	1928	1929	1930	1931
Winter Olympics	8th			
World Championships		4th		
European Championships			2nd	7th
National
Austrian Championships			3rd	2nd
