= Figure skating at the 1932 Winter Olympics =

Figure skating at the III Winter Olympics
- Type: Olympic Games

Champions
- Men's singles: (Austria) Karl Schäfer
- Ladies' singles: (Norway) Sonja Henie
- Pairs: (France) Andrée Brunet / Pierre Brunet
- Previous: 1928 Winter Olympics
- Next: 1936 Winter Olympics

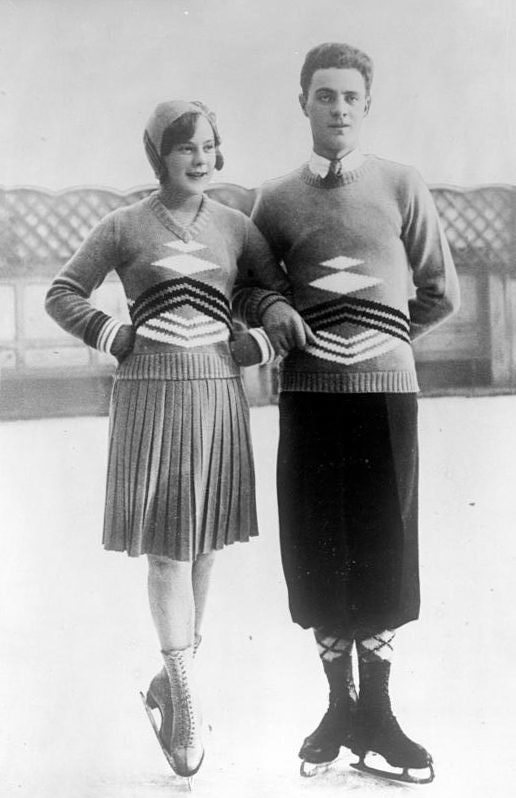
Figure skating

Figure skating at the 1932 Winter Olympics took place at the Olympic Center Arena in Lake Placid, New York. Three figure skating events were contested: men's singles, ladies' singles, and pair skating. The competitions were held from Monday, 8 February to Friday, 12 February 1932. It was the first time the events were held indoors.

== Medal summary ==
=== Medalists ===
Event	Gold	Silver	Bronze
Men's singles	Karl Schäfer (AUT)	Gillis Grafström (SWE)	Montgomery Wilson (CAN)
Ladies' singles	Sonja Henie (NOR)	Fritzi Burger (AUT)	Maribel Vinson (USA)
Pair skating	Andrée Brunet and Pierre Brunet (FRA)	Beatrix Loughran and Sherwin Badger (USA)	Emília Rotter and László Szollás (HUN)

=== Medal table ===
Rank	Nation	Gold	Silver	Bronze	Total
1	Austria	1	1	0	2
2	France	1	0	0	1
2	Norway	1	0	0	1
4	United States	0	1	1	2
5	Sweden	0	1	0	1
6	Canada	0	0	1	1
6	Hungary	0	0	1	1
Totals (7 entries)		3	3	3	9

== Participating nations ==
Two figure skaters competed in both the singles and the pairs event.

A total of 39 figure skaters (18 men and 21 ladies) from 13 nations (men from ten nations and ladies from nine nations) competed at the Lake Placid Games:

- Austria (2) (men 1, women 1)
- Belgium (1) (men 0, women 1)
- Canada (6) (men 2, women 4)
- Czechoslovakia (1) (men 1, women 0)
- Finland (1) (men 1, women 0)
- France (2) (men 1, women 1)
- Germany (1) (men 1, women 0)
- Great Britain (4) (men 0, women 4)
- Hungary (4) (men 2, women 2)
- Japan (2) (men 2, women 0)
- Norway (1) (men 0, women 1)
- Sweden (2) (men 1, women 1)
- United States (12) (men 6, women 6)
