= László Szollás =

Hungarian figure skater

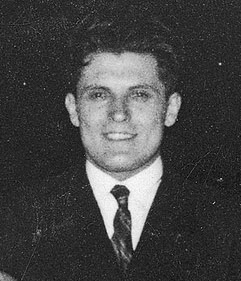
- Szollás in 1935

Personal information
- Full name: László Szollás
- Born: 13 November 1907 Budapest, Hungary
- Died: 4 October 1980 (aged 72) Budapest, Hungary

Figure skating career
- Country: Hungary
- Retired: 1936
Medal record
Representing Hungary
Pairs Figure skating
Olympic Games
Bronze medal – third place	1936 Garmisch-Partenkirchen	Pairs
Bronze medal – third place	1932 Lake Placid	Pairs
World Championships
Gold medal – first place	1935 Budapest	Pairs
Gold medal – first place	1934 Helsinki	Pairs
Gold medal – first place	1933 Stockholm	Pairs
Silver medal – second place	1932 Montreal	Pairs
Gold medal – first place	1931 Berlin	Pairs
European Championships
Gold medal – first place	1934 Prague	Pairs
Silver medal – second place	1931 St. Moritz	Pairs
Silver medal – second place	1930 Vienna	Pairs

László (Ladislaus) Szollás (13 November 1907 – 4 October 1980) was a Hungarian world champion and Olympic medalist pair skater.

== Early life ==
Szollás was Jewish. He attended the Ludovika Military Academy in the Horthy era..

== Figure skating career ==
With partner Emília Rotter he won the World Figure Skating Championship four times in five years (1931, 1933, 1934, and 1935), and they were the 1932 World silver medalists. They were also the 1934 European Champions, and 1930 and 1931 silver medalists.

They represented Hungary at the 1932 Winter Olympics and at the 1936 Winter Olympics, winning two bronze medals.

== Later life ==
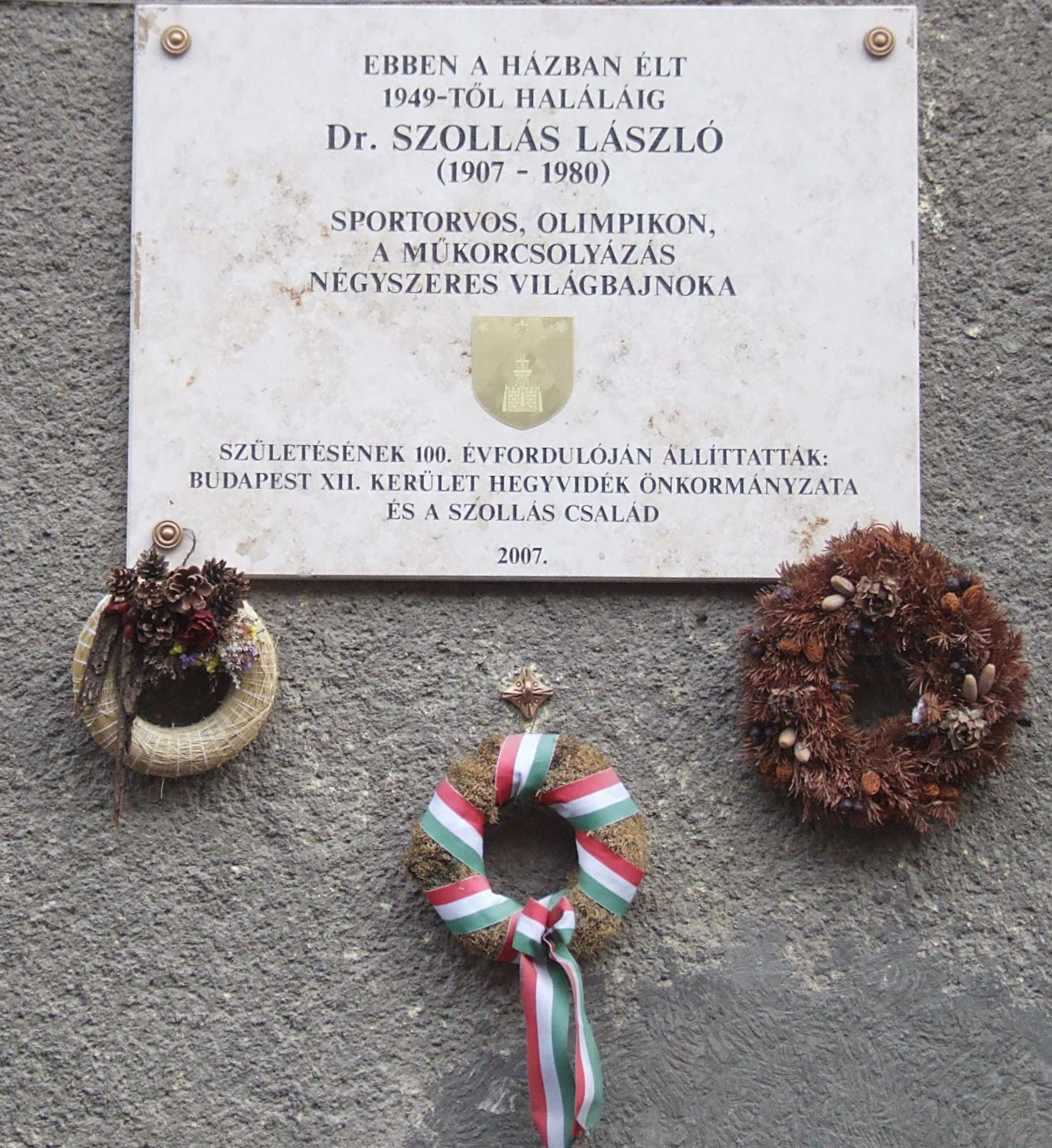
László Szollás commemorative plaque in Budapest District XII, Győri Street No 2/c

After retirement, Szollás attended Semmelweis Medical School in Budapest and earned a medical degree at the Royal Hungarian Pázmány Péter University. He joined the military in 1934 and became a military doctor in 1936. From 1945 until 1948, he was a prisoner of war, first by the Americans and then later the Soviets. Upon returning to Hungary the Hungarian Stalinist government nationalized nearly all of his assets, including a large rental apartment building in Budapest's 7th district..

Once he returned to Hungary, he spent a short time as a physician at Kossuth Academy, then in 1951 became a surgeon at the Országos Sportegészségügyi Intézet (National Institute of Sports Medicine) in Budapest. He also returned to skating as a coach and judge. He coached the pair Marianna and László Nagy after their coach was imprisoned due to a skater's defection in 1950, and he served as President of the Hungarian Skating Association from 1956 to 1961.

== Hall of Fame ==
He and his partner, Emília Rotter, were elected to the International Jewish Sports Hall of Fame in 1995.

== Competitive highlights ==
(with Rotter)

Event	1929	1930	1931	1932	1933	1934	1935	1936
Winter Olympic Games				3rd				3rd
World Championships	5th		1st	2nd	1st	1st	1st	
European Championships		2nd	2nd			1st		
Hungarian Championships			1st	1st	1st	1st	1st	1st

== See also ==
- List of select Jewish figure skaters
- List of flag bearers for Hungary at the Olympics
