= Sándor Szalay (figure skater) =

Hungarian figure skater

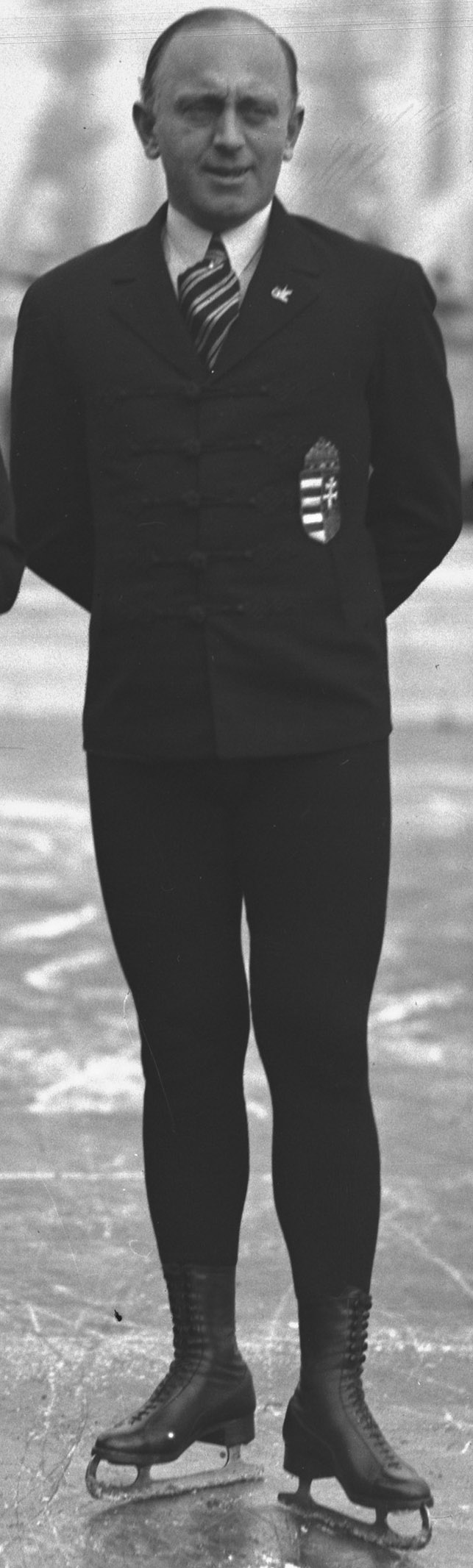
- Szalay in 1930

Personal information
- Born: 6 June 1893
- Died: 5 April 1965 (aged 71)

Figure skating career
- Country: Hungary
- Partner: Olga Orgonista
- Retired: 1932
Medal record
Representing Hungary
Pairs Figure skating
World Championships
| Silver medal – second place | 1931 Berlin | Pairs |
| Bronze medal – third place | 1929 Budapest | Pairs |
European Championships
| Gold medal – first place | 1931 St. Moritz | Pairs |
| Gold medal – first place | 1930 Vienna | Pairs |

Sándor Szalay (also Sándorral Szalay) (6 June 1893 – 5 April 1965) was a Hungarian pair skater. With partner Olga Orgonista, he was the 1930 and 1931 European Champion. They won two medals at the World Figure Skating Championships, a bronze in 1929 and a silver in 1931. They placed 4th at the 1932 Winter Olympics. After the 1932 World Figure Skating Championships, Sándor and Olga retired. Sándor worked as a construction inspector in a rubber factory, and served as the president of the Hungarian Skating Federation from 1945 to 1950.

== Results ==
(pairs with Olga Orgonista)

| Event | 1928 | 1929 | 1930 | 1931 | 1932 |
|---|---|---|---|---|---|
| Winter Olympic Games | | | | | 4th |
| World Championships | | 3rd | | 2nd | 4th |
| European Championships | | | 1st | 1st | |
| Hungarian Championships | 1st | 1st | 1st | | |
