= Marcus Nikkanen =

Finnish figure skater

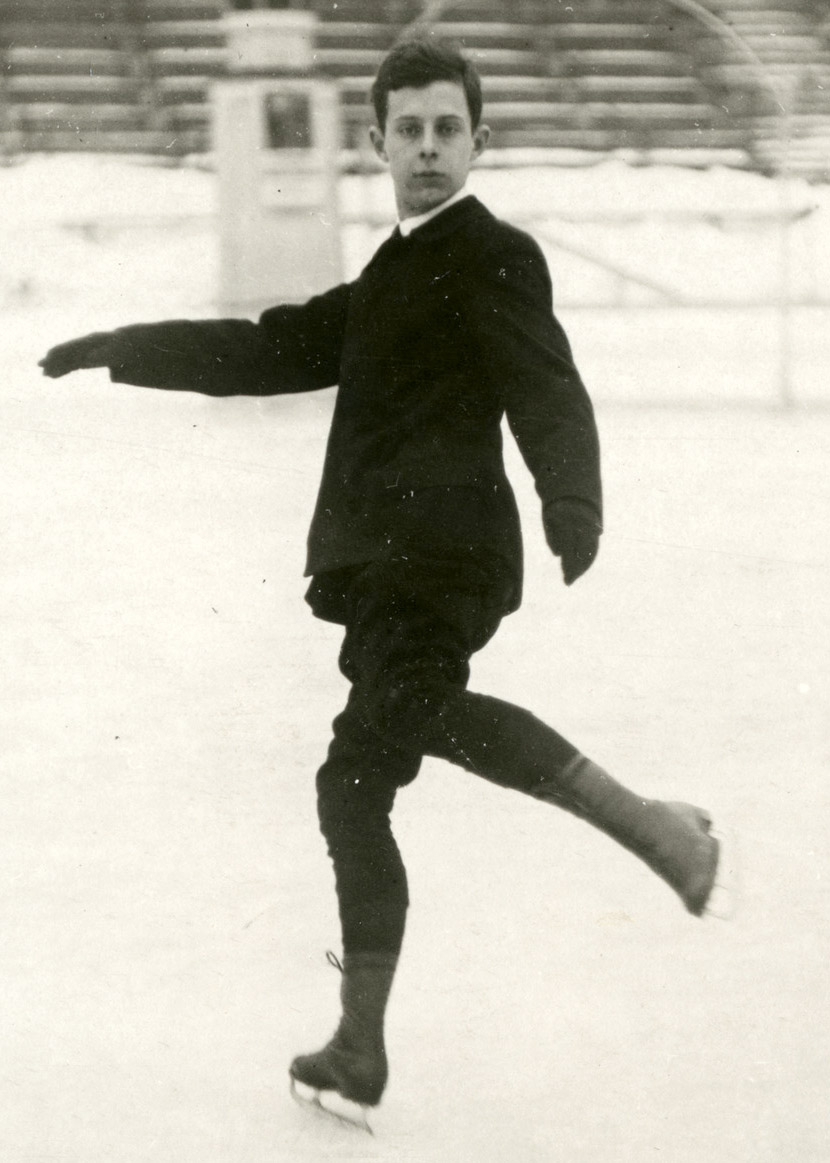
- Nikkanen in 1921

Personal information
- Full name: Marcus Rafael Nikkanen
- Born: 26 January 1904 Helsinki, Grand Duchy of Finland, Russian Empire
- Died: 28 March 1985 (aged 81) Helsinki, Finland

Figure skating career
- Country: Finland
- Skating club: Helsingfors Skridskoklubb
Medal record
Representing Finland
Men's Figure skating
World Championships
Bronze medal – third place	1933 Zürich	Men's singles
European Championships
Bronze medal – third place	1930 Vienna	Men's singles

Marcus Rafael Nikkanen (26 January 1904 – 28 March 1985) was a Finnish figure skater. He was the 1930 European bronze medalist and the 1933 World bronze medalist. He represented Finland at the 1928 Winter Olympics, at the 1932 Winter Olympics, and the 1936 Winter Olympics. He placed sixth in 1928, fourth in 1932, and seventh in 1936.

He was born and died in Helsinki.

== Results ==
International
Event	1922	1923	1927	1928	1929	1930	1931	1932	1933	1934	1935	1936	1937	1938	1939	1945	1946
Winter Olympics				6th				4th				7th					
World Champ.					6th		7th	4th	3rd	4th	5th		7th				
European Champ.						3rd					5th	6th	7th				
Nordics																	3rd
National
Finnish Champ.	3rd	2nd	1st	1st	1st	1st				1st	1st	2nd		1st	1st	1st	1st
