= Olga Orgonista =

Hungarian pair skater

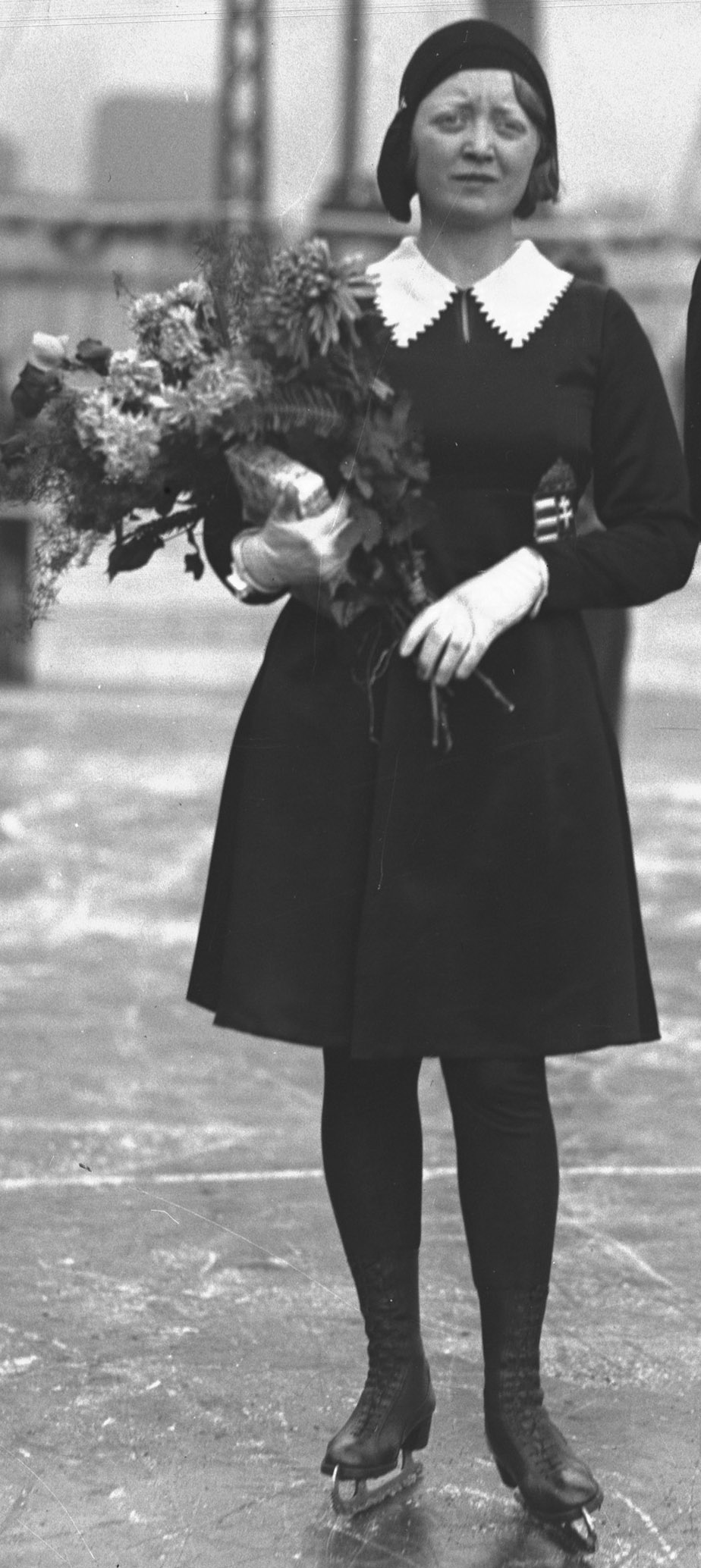
- Orgonista in 1930

Personal information
- Born: 22 February 1901
- Died: 20 November 1978 (aged 77)

Figure skating career
- Country: Hungary
- Partner: Sándor Szalay
- Retired: 1932
Medal record
Representing Hungary
Pairs Figure skating
World Championships
Silver medal – second place	1931 Berlin	Pairs
Bronze medal – third place	1929 Budapest	Pairs
European Championships
Gold medal – first place	1931 St. Moritz	Pairs
Gold medal – first place	1930 Vienna	Pairs

Olga Orgonista (born 22 February 1901 in Budapest, died 20 November 1978 in Budapest) was a Hungarian pair skater. With partner Sándor Szalay, she was the 1930 and 1931 European Champion. They won two medals at the World Figure Skating Championships, a bronze in 1929 and a silver in 1931. They placed 4th at the 1932 Winter Olympics.

== Results ==
(pairs with Sándor Szalay)

Event	1928	1929	1930	1931	1932
Winter Olympic Games					4th
World Championships		3rd		2nd	4th
European Championships			1st	1st	
Hungarian Championships	1st	1st	1st		
