= Emília Rotter =

Hungarian pair skater (1906–2003)

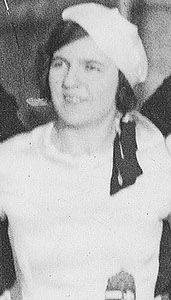
- Rotter in 1934

Personal information
- Full name: Emília Rotter
- Born: 8 September 1906 Budapest
- Died: 28 January 2003 (aged 96) Budapest

Figure skating career
- Country: Hungary
- Retired: 1936
Medal record
Pairs figure skating
Representing Hungary
Olympic Games
Bronze medal – third place	1936 Garmisch-Partenkirchen	Pairs
Bronze medal – third place	1932 Lake Placid	Pairs
World Championships
Gold medal – first place	1935 Budapest	Pairs
Gold medal – first place	1934 Helsinki	Pairs
Gold medal – first place	1933 Stockholm	Pairs
Silver medal – second place	1932 Montreal	Pairs
Gold medal – first place	1931 Berlin	Pairs
European Championships
Gold medal – first place	1934 Prague	Pairs
Silver medal – second place	1931 St. Moritz	Pairs
Silver medal – second place	1930 Vienna	Pairs

Emília Rotter (8 September 1906 in Budapest, Hungary – 28 January 2003) was a Hungarian pair skater.

With partner László Szollás she won the World Figure Skating Championship four times in five years (1931, 1933, 1934, and 1935), and were the 1932 World silver medalists. They were the 1934 European Champions and 1930 & 1931 silver medalists. They represented Hungary at the 1932 Winter Olympics and at the 1936 Winter Olympics, winning two bronze medals.

Rotter was Jewish, and was inducted into the International Jewish Sports Hall of Fame in 1995.

== Competitive highlights ==
(with Szollás)

Event	1929	1930	1931	1932	1933	1934	1935	1936
Winter Olympic Games				3rd				3rd
World Championships	5th		1st	2nd	1st	1st	1st	
European Championships		2nd	2nd			1st		
Hungarian Championships			1st	1st	1st	1st	1st	1st

== See also ==
- List of select Jewish figure skaters
