= Yvonne de Ligne =

Belgian figure skater

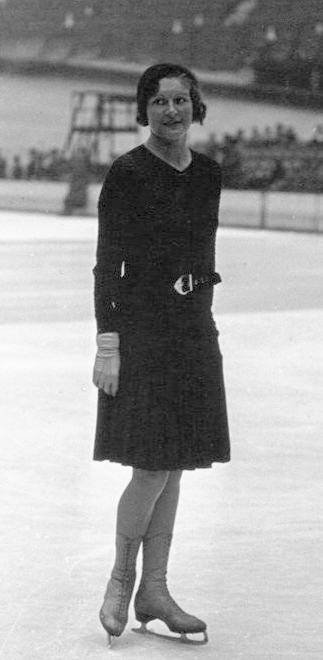
- Yvonne de Ligne at the 1932 European Championships

Personal information
- Born: 18 May 1902 Brussels, Belgium
- Died: 1952 (aged c. 50)

Sport
- Sport: Figure skating

Yvonne de Ligne (née Geurts; 18 May 1902 – 1952) was a Belgian figure skater. She competed in the ladies' singles event at all major competitions from 1929 to 1936, including Winter Olympics, world and European championships. Her best achievements were sixth place at the 1929 and 1932 world championships and 1932 Olympics, and fifth place at the 1933 European Championships.

She was born Yvonne Geurts and changed her last name after marrying speed skater Charles de Ligne. During World War II she fell in love with Dutch figure skater Jacob Hartog, who then lived in Antwerp. She arranged the murder of her husband, for which she was sentenced to death, which was later reduced to a 20-year prison sentence. Geurts was released from prison in August 1951 due to her suffering from tuberculosis. She died from her illness shortly thereafter.
