= 1937 World Figure Skating Championships =

Annual figure skating competition held in 1937

- Type: ISU Championship
- Date: February 12-13 (men); March 1-2 (ladies and pairs)
- Season: 1937
- Location: Vienna, Austria (men); London, United Kingdom (ladies and pairs)
- Venue: Empress Stadion (ladies and pairs)

Champions
- Men's singles: (Austria) Felix Kaspar
- Ladies' singles: (United Kingdom) Cecilia Colledge
- Pairs: (Nazi Germany) Maxi Herber / Ernst Baier
- Previous: 1936 World Championships
- Next: 1938 World Championships

The World Figure Skating Championships is an annual figure skating competition sanctioned by the International Skating Union in which figure skaters compete for the title of World Champion.

Men's competitions took place from February 12 to 13 in Vienna, Austria. Ladies' and pairs' competitions took place from March 1 to 2 also in London, United Kingdom.

== Medal table ==
* Host nations (Austria, Great Britain)

Rank	Nation	Gold	Silver	Bronze	Total
1	Great Britain*	1	2	1	4
2	Austria*	1	1	0	2
3	Germany	1	0	0	1
4	Hungary	0	0	1	1
4	Sweden	0	0	1	1
Totals (5 entries)		3	3	3	9

== Results ==
=== Men ===
Rank	Name	CF		FS		Points	Places
1	(Austria) Felix Kaspar	1	210.30	1	147.468	357.768	5
2	(United Kingdom) Graham Sharp	2	204.62	3	140.616	345.236	10
3	(Kingdom of Hungary) Elemer Tertak	3	199.62	5	138.892	338.52	17
4	(Austria) Herbert Alward	5	197.02	4	139.608	336.628	19
5	(United Kingdom) Freddie Tomlins	7	189.18	2	142.264	332.064	25
6	(Austria) Leopold Linhart	6	194.02	6	137.088	331.108	30
7	(Finland) Marcus Nikkanen	4	197.38	10	129.528	326.908	35
8	(Belgium) Freddy Mesot	8	187.8	8	130.808	318.608	42
9	(Austria) Emil Ratzenhofer	10	185.00	7	131.040	316.040	45
10	(Switzerland) Lucian Büeler	9	186.52	11	123.228	309.748	52
11	(Czechoslovakia) Jaroslav Sadílek	11	183.48	9	129.780	313.260	50

Judges:

- (Switzerland) A. Huber
- (Austria) Rudolf Kaler
- (Czechoslovakia) B. Pavliska
- (Nazi Germany) Fritz Schober
- (Kingdom of Hungary) Andor Szende

=== Ladies ===
Rank	Name	Places
1	(United Kingdom) Cecilia Colledge	7
2	(United Kingdom) Megan Taylor	14
3	(Sweden) Vivi-Anne Hultén	25.5
4	(France) Hedy Stenuf	31.5
5	(Austria) Emmy Putzinger	32
6	(Austria) Hanne Niernberger	42
7	(United Kingdom) Belita Jepson-Turner	49
8	(United Kingdom) Gladys Jagger	58
9	(Nazi Germany) Martha Mayerhans	70
10	(Switzerland) Angela Anderes	72
11	(Nazi Germany) Victoria Lindpaintner	67
12	(United States) Audrey Peppe	78

Judges:

- (Sweden) August Anderberg
- (United Kingdom) Herbert Clarke
- (Nazi Germany) Kurt Dannenberg
- (Austria) Fritz Kachler
- (France) Charles Sabouret
- (Poland) K. Skulicz
- (Kingdom of Hungary) Andor Szende

=== Pairs ===
Rank	Name	Places
1	(Nazi Germany) Maxi Herber / Ernst Baier	8.5
2	(Austria) Ilse Pausin / Erich Pausin	14.5
3	(United Kingdom) Violet Cliff / Leslie Cliff	24.5
4	(Kingdom of Hungary) Piroska Szekrényessy / Attila Szekrényessy	30.5
5	(Nazi Germany) Inge Koch / Günther Noack	31.5
6	(Kingdom of Italy) Anna Cattaneo / Ercole Cattaneo	42.5
7	(Poland) Stephanie Kalus / Erwin Kalus	46.5
8	(Czechoslovakia) Feda Kalenčíková / Karel Globar	53.5

Judges:

- (Kingdom of Italy) E. Bonfiglio
- (Nazi Germany) Kurt Dannenberg
- (Austria) Hans Grünauer
- (United Kingdom) John Page
- (Poland) K. Skulicz
- (Czechoslovakia) Josef Slíva
- (Kingdom of Hungary) Andor Szende

== Sources ==
- newspaper Berliner Tageblatt, 4 March 1937
