= 1938 European Figure Skating Championships =

Figure skating competition

1938 European Championships
- Type: ISU Championship
- Season: 1937–38
- Location: St. Moritz, Switzerland

Champions
- Men's singles: (Austria) Felix Kaspar
- Ladies' singles: (United Kingdom) Cecilia Colledge
- Pairs: (Nazi Germany) Maxi Herber / Ernst Baier
- Previous: 1937 European Championships
- Next: 1939 European Championships

The 1938 European Figure Skating Championships were held in St. Moritz, Switzerland. Elite senior-level figure skaters from European ISU member nations competed for the title of European Champion in the disciplines of men's singles, ladies' singles, and pair skating.

== Results ==
=== Men ===
Rank	Name	Places
1	(Austria) Felix Kaspar	
2	(United Kingdom) Graham Sharp	
3	(Austria) Herbert Alward	
4	(Nazi Germany) Horst Faber	
5	(Kingdom of Hungary) Elemér Terták	27
6	(United Kingdom) Freddie Tomlins	
7	(Austria) Edi Rada	
8	(Nazi Germany) Günther Lorenz	
9	(Denmark) Per Cock-Clausen	

=== Ladies ===
Rank	Name	Places
1	(United Kingdom) Cecilia Colledge	
2	(United Kingdom) Megan Taylor	
3	(Austria) Emmy Putzinger	
4	(Nazi Germany) Maxi Herber	
5	(Nazi Germany) Lydia Veicht	
6	(Switzerland) Angela Anderes	
7	(United Kingdom) Gladys Jagger	
8	(Czechoslovakia) Eva Nyklová	
9	(Austria) Hanne Niernberger	
10	(United Kingdom) Daphne Walker	
11	(United Kingdom) Pamela Stephany	
12	(Austria) Lissy König	
13	(Kingdom of Hungary) Nadine Szilassy	
14	(Nazi Germany) Susi Demoll	
15	(Switzerland) Inge Manger	
16	(France) Jacqueline Bossoutrot	
17	(Czechoslovakia) Zdeňka Porgesova	

=== Pairs ===
Rank	Name	Places
1	(Nazi Germany) Maxi Herber / Ernst Baier	
2	(Austria) Ilse Pausin / Erich Pausin	
3	(Nazi Germany) Inge Koch / Günther Noack	
4	(Kingdom of Hungary) Piroska Szekrényessy / Attila Szekrényessy	20
5	(Poland) Stephanie Kalusz / Erwin Kalusz	
6	(Czechoslovakia) A. Wächter / Fritz Lesk	
