= 1937 European Figure Skating Championships =

Figure skating competition

1937 European Championships
- Type: ISU Championship
- Season: 1936–37
- Location: Prague, Czechoslovakia

Champions
- Men's singles: (Austria) Felix Kaspar
- Ladies' singles: (United Kingdom) Cecilia Colledge
- Pairs: (Nazi Germany) Maxi Herber / Ernst Baier
- Previous: 1936 European Championships
- Next: 1938 European Championships

The 1937 European Figure Skating Championships were held in Prague, Czechoslovakia. Elite senior-level figure skaters from European ISU member nations competed for the title of European Champion in the disciplines of men's singles, ladies' singles, and pair skating.

== Results ==
=== Men ===
Rank	Name	Places
1	(Austria) Felix Kaspar	
2	(United Kingdom) Graham Sharp	
3	(Kingdom of Hungary) Elemér Terták	20
4	(United Kingdom) Freddie Tomlins	
5	(Austria) Herbert Alward	
6	(Austria) Leopold Linhart	
7	(Finland) Marcus Nikkanen	
8	(Nazi Germany) Horst Faber	
9	(Czechoslovakia) Jaroslav Sadílek	
10	(Belgium) Freddy Mésot	
11	(France) Jean Henrion	
12	(Czechoslovakia) Rudolf Praznowski	
13	(Kingdom of Yugoslavia) Paul Schwab	
14	(Kingdom of Yugoslavia) Emanuel Thuma	

=== Ladies ===
Rank	Name	Places
1	(United Kingdom) Cecilia Colledge	
2	(United Kingdom) Megan Taylor	
3	(Austria) Emmy Putzinger	
4	(France) Hedy Stenuf	
5	(Austria) Hanne Niernberger	
6	(United Kingdom) Gladys Jagger	
7	(Czechoslovakia) Věra Hrubá	
8	(Czechoslovakia) Eva Nyklová	
9	(Kingdom of Hungary) Klára Erdős	
10	(Nazi Germany) Martha Mayerhans	
11	(United States) Audrey Peppe	
12	(United Kingdom) Joy Ricketts	
13	(Nazi Germany) Irma Hartung	
14	(Norway) Gerd Helland-Bjørnstad	
15	(Norway) Anne-Marie Sæther	

=== Pairs ===
Rank	Name	Places
1	(Nazi Germany) Maxi Herber / Ernst Baier	
2	(Austria) Ilse Pausin / Erich Pausin	
3	(Kingdom of Hungary) Piroska Szekrényessy / Attila Szekrényessy	24.5
4	(United Kingdom) Violet Cliff / Leslie Cliff	
5	(Nazi Germany) Inge Koch / Günther Noack	
6	(Kingdom of Italy) Anna Cattaneo / Ercole Cattaneo	
7	(Austria) Liese Kianek / Adolf Rosdol	
8	(Czechoslovakia) Věra Trejbalová / Josef Vosolsobě	
9	(Czechoslovakia) Feda Kalenčíková / Karel Glogar	
