= 1936 World Figure Skating Championships =

Annual figure skating competition held in 1936

- Type: ISU Championship
- Date: February 28 – 29 (men and pairs); February 21 – 22 (ladies)
- Season: 1936
- Location: Paris, France

Champions
- Men's singles: (Austria) Karl Schäfer
- Ladies' singles: (Norway) Sonja Henie
- Pairs: (Nazi Germany) Maxi Herber / Ernst Baier
- Previous: 1935 World Championships
- Next: 1937 World Championships

The World Figure Skating Championships is an annual figure skating competition sanctioned by the International Skating Union in which figure skaters compete for the title of World Champion.

Men's and pairs' competitions took place from February 28 to 29 in Paris, France. Ladies' competitions took place from February 21 to 22 also in Paris, France.

== Medal table ==
* Host nation (France)

Rank	Nation	Gold	Silver	Bronze	Total
1	Austria	1	1	1	3
2	Germany	1	0	0	1
2	Norway	1	0	0	1
4	Great Britain	0	2	1	3
5	Sweden	0	0	1	1
Totals (5 entries)		3	3	3	9

== Results ==
=== Men ===
Rank	Name	Age	CF		FS		Points	Places
1	(Austria) Karl Schäfer	26	1	226.76	1	156.80	383.56	6
2	(United Kingdom) Graham Sharp	18	2	224.66	4	152.60	377.26	10
3	(Austria) Felix Kaspar	21	3	215.70	3	154.56	370.26	17
4	(United Kingdom) Jack Dunn	19	5	213.54	2	155.40	368.94	18
5	(Canada) Montgomery Wilson	26	4	214.40	6	146.64	361.04	26
6	(Kingdom of Hungary) Dénes Pataky	19	6	206.36	5	148.96	355.32	29
7	(Austria) Leopold Linhart	21	10	194.66	7	141.96	336.62	42
8	(United States) Robin Lee	16	7	200.92	10	134.12	335.04	42
9	(Austria) Herbert Alward		8	198.62	9	134.40	333.02	43
10	(Belgium) Freddy Mésot	30	9	196.54	8	136.64	333.18	45
11	(United States) Erle Reiter	19	11	191.68	13	127.32	319.00	58
12	(France) Jean Henrion		14	185.70	11	129.17	314.87	63
13	(Japan) Toshikazu Katayama	22	12	188.98	12	127.40	316.38	62
14	(Switzerland) Lucian Büeler	25	13	188.60	17	119.56	308.16	69
15	(Japan) Kazuyoshi Oimatsu	24	15	176.56	14	125.44	302.00	77
16	(Japan) Zenjiro Watanabe	21	16	172.48	16	119.28	291.76	78
17	(Japan) Tsugio Hasegawa	22	17	166.88	15	121.52	288.40	80

Judges:

- (France) Louis Barbey
- (United Kingdom) Kenneth Dundas
- (Austria) Rudolf Kaler
- (United States) Charles Rotch
- (Nazi Germany) Fritz Schober

=== Ladies ===
Rank	Name	Age	CF		FS		Points	Places
1	(Norway) Sonja Henie	23	1	237.65	1	161.15	398.80	7
2	(United Kingdom) Megan Taylor	15	2	228.72	4	150.80	379.52	15
3	(Sweden) Vivi-Anne Hultén	24	3	222.58	2	153.99	376.57	21
4	(Austria) Emmy Putzinger	14	6	212.82	3	151.23	363.43	31
5	(United Kingdom) Gweneth Butler	20	4	217.42	11	138.20	355.62	37
6	(Nazi Germany) Victoria Lindpaintner	17	5	215.91	6	140.60	356.51	37
7	(United Kingdom) Mollie Phillips	28	8	202.94	5	140.90	343.74	53
8	(United Kingdom) Mia Macklin		7	206.11	8	139.80	345.91	55
9	(United Kingdom) Pamela Prior		9	201.27	10	138.60	339.87	69
10	(Japan) Etsuko Inada	11	10	198.57	9	139.40	337.97	73
11	(Belgium) Yvonne de Ligne-Geurts	28	11	198.17	12	136.17	334.34	81
12	(United Kingdom) Glady Jagger		15	193.47	13	136.11	329.58	85
13	(United States) Audrey Peppe	18	16	186.85	7	140.20	327.05	92
14	(France) Gaby Clericetti		13	195.74	14	133.33	329.07	95
15	(France) Jacqueline Vaudecrane	22	14	194.22				102
16	(United Kingdom) Pamela Stephany		12	194.74				102
17	(France) Jeanine Garanger		17	186.61				115

Judges:

- (Austria) Wilhelm Bayerle
- (Norway) B. Børjeson
- (United Kingdom) W. Bowhill
- (Belgium) Fernand de Montigny
- (United States) Charles Rotch
- (France) Charles Sabouret
- (Nazi Germany) Fritz Schober

=== Pairs ===
Rank	Name	Age	Points	Places
1	(Nazi Germany) Maxi Herber / Ernst Baier	15/30	11.40	5
2	(Austria) Ilse Pausin / Erich Pausin	16/15	11.10	11
3	(United Kingdom) Violet Cliff / Leslie Cliff	19/27	10.72	18
4	(Canada) Louise Bertram / Stewart Reburn	27/23	10.56	20
5	(United States) Maribel Vinson / George Hill	24/28	10.54	22
6	(United States) Grace Madden / J. Lester Madden	24/26	10.04	29

Judges:

- (United Kingdom) Kenneth Dundas
- (Austria) Hans Grünauer
- (United States) Charles Rotch
- (France) Charles Sabouret
- (Nazi Germany) Fritz Schober
