= 1938 World Figure Skating Championships =

Annual figure skating competition held in 1938

- Type: ISU Championship
- Date: February 4-5 (ladies); February 18-19 (men and pairs)
- Season: 1938
- Location: Stockholm, Sweden (ladies) (Nazi Germany) Berlin, Germany (men and pairs)

Champions
- Men's singles: (Austria) Felix Kaspar
- Ladies' singles: (United Kingdom) Megan Taylor
- Pairs: (Nazi Germany) Maxi Herber / Ernst Baier
- Previous: 1937 World Championships
- Next: 1939 World Championships

The World Figure Skating Championships is an annual figure skating competition sanctioned by the International Skating Union in which figure skaters compete for the title of World Champion.

Men's competitions took place on February 18 to 19 in Berlin, Germany and ladies' competitions took place on February 4 to 5 in Stockholm, Sweden. Pairs' competition took place on February 18 in Berlin, Germany.

== Results ==
=== Men ===
Graham Sharp won the CF by 231.4 ahead of Felix Kaspar who gained 229.7, but the FS won by Kaspar with 164.6 ahead of Sharp who gained 159.8. With this in the overall points Felix Kaspar finished before Graham Sharp with 3.1 margin.

Rank	Name	CF	FS	Points	Places
1	(Austria) Felix Kaspar	2	1	394.3	9
2	(United Kingdom) Graham Sharp	1	2	391.2	12
3	(Austria) Herbert Alward	3		363.6	32
4	(Nazi Germany) Horst Faber	4		368.1	33
5	(United Kingdom) Freddie Tomlins	7		366.4	35
6	(Belgium) Robert van Zeebroeck	9		366.0	37
7	(Austria) Edi Rada	6		359.3	47
8	(Nazi Germany) Günther Lorenz	8		357.7	47
9	(Kingdom of Hungary) Elemer Tertak	5			65
10	(Denmark) Per Cock-Clausen	10			68

- Referee: (Nazi Germany) Kurt Dannenberg

Judges:

- (United Kingdom) Herbert Clarke
- (Belgium) E. Delpy
- (Nazi Germany) O. Gattwinkel
- (Finland) Walter Jakobsson
- (Austria) Rudolf Kaler
- (Kingdom of Hungary) János Liedemann
- (Denmark) P. Sørensen

=== Ladies ===
Rank	Name	Places
1	(United Kingdom) Megan Taylor	7
2	(United Kingdom) Cecilia Colledge	8
3	(United States) Hedy Stenuf	21
4	(United Kingdom) Gladys Jagger	22
5	(Nazi Germany) Lydia Veicht	23
6	(Austria) Hanne Niernberger	29
7	(United Kingdom) Daphne Walker	30
8	(Norway) Gerd Helland-Bjørnstad	43
9	(Sweden) Gunnel Ericson	44
10	(Sweden) Britta Råhlén	50
11	(Norway) Anne-Marie Sæther	53
WD	(Austria) Emmy Putzinger	DNS

Judges:

- (United Kingdom) Herbert Clarke
- (Austria) H. Deistler
- (Norway) Z. Johansen
- (Sweden) Thore Mothander
- (Nazi Germany) P. Weiss

=== Pairs ===
Rank	Name	Places
1	(Nazi Germany) Maxi Herber / Ernst Baier	12
2	(Austria) Ilse Pausin / Erich Pausin	16
3	(Nazi Germany) Inge Koch / Günther Noack	30
4	(United Kingdom) Violet Cliff / Leslie Cliff	37
5	(Kingdom of Hungary) Piroska Szekrényessy / Attila Szekrényessy	44
6	(Switzerland) Pierette Dubois / Paul Dubois	67
7	(Nazi Germany) Elisabeth Roth / Bruno Walter	72.5
8	(Nazi Germany) Gisela Grätz / Otto Weiß	79
9	(Austria) Hildegard Faulhaber / Karl Eigel	79.5
10	(Kingdom of Italy) Anna Cattaneo / Ercole Cattaneo	82.5
11	(Austria) Elisabeth Kianek / Adolf Rosdol	88
12	(Poland) Stephanie Kalusz / Erwin Kalusz	94.5
13	(Czechoslovakia) A. Wächter / Fritz Lesk	117

Judges:

- (Kingdom of Italy) E. Bonfiglio
- (United Kingdom) Herbert Clarke
- (Austria) Eduard Engelmann
- (Finland) Ludowika Jakobsson-Eilers
- (Poland) Alfred Theuer
- (Nazi Germany) P. Weiss
- (Switzerland) A. Winkler
- (Czechoslovakia) Otto Zappe
