= 1939 World Figure Skating Championships =

Annual figure skating competition held in 1939

- Type: ISU Championship
- Date: February 11–12 (men and pairs); February 17–19 (ladies)
- Season: 1939
- Location: (Kingdom of Hungary) Budapest, Hungary (men and pairs); Prague, Czechoslovakia (ladies)

Champions
- Men's singles: (United Kingdom) Graham Sharp
- Ladies' singles: (United Kingdom) Megan Taylor
- Pairs: (Nazi Germany) Maxi Herber / Ernst Baier
- Previous: 1938 World Championships
- Next: 1947 World Championships

The World Figure Skating Championships is an annual figure skating competition sanctioned by the International Skating Union in which figure skaters compete for the title of World Champion.

Men and pairs competitions took place from February 17 to 19 in Budapest, Hungary. Ladies' competitions took place from February 11 to 12 in Prague, Czechoslovakia.

These World Figure Skating Championships were the last before World War II. The Austrian skaters Edi Rada, Emmy Puzinger, Ilse Pausin / Erich Pausin, and the judge H. Deistler represented Germany. The former Austrian skater Herbert Alward represented Hungary.

== Results ==
=== Men ===
Rank	Name	Places
1	(United Kingdom) Graham Sharp	5
2	(United Kingdom) Freddie Tomlins	11
3	(Nazi Germany) Horst Faber	15
4	(Austria) Edi Rada	24
5	(Kingdom of Hungary) Herbert Alward	27
6	(Kingdom of Hungary) Elemér Terták	25
7	(Kingdom of Hungary) Kristóf Kállay	36
8	(Nazi Germany) Franz Loichinger	39
9	(Denmark) Per Cock-Clausen	43
10	(Romania) Max Bindea	52
11	(Estonia) Alfred Hirv	53

Judges:

- (United Kingdom) Herbert Clarke
- (Poland) J. Kowalski
- (Nazi Germany) Fritz Schober
- (Kingdom of Hungary) Andor Szende
- (Switzerland) A. Winkler

=== Ladies ===
Rank	Name	Places
1	(United Kingdom) Megan Taylor	5
2	(United States) Hedy Stenuf	14
3	(United Kingdom) Daphne Walker	15
4	(Nazi Germany) Lydia Veicht	18
5	(Czechoslovakia) Eva Nyklová	27
6	(Austria) Emmy Putzinger	29
7	(Austria) Marta Musilek	37
8	(United Kingdom) Gladys Jagger	35
9	(Norway) Gerd Helland-Bjørnstad	52
10	(Norway) Anne-Marie Sæther	53
11	(Switzerland) Anita Wägeler	54
12	(Norway) Turid Helland-Bjørnstad	57
13	(Sweden) Britta Råhlén	52
14	(France) Jacqueline Bossoutrot	65
15	(Czechoslovakia) Zdeňka Porgesova	75

Judges:

- (United Kingdom) Herbert Clarke
- (Austria) H. Deistler
- (Czechoslovakia) J. Hainz
- (Switzerland) A. Huber
- (France) Charles Sabouret

=== Pairs ===
Rank	Name	Places
1	(Nazi Germany) Maxi Herber / Ernst Baier	8
2	(Austria) Ilse Pausin / Erich Pausin	13
3	(Nazi Germany) Inge Koch / Günther Noack	24
4	(Kingdom of Hungary) Piroska Szekrényessy / Attila Szekrényessy	32
5	(United Kingdom) Violet Cliff / Leslie Cliff	38
6	(Switzerland) Pierette Dubois / Paul Dubois	44.5
7	(Kingdom of Hungary) Nadine Szilassy / Ferenc Kertész	48
8	(Kingdom of Hungary) Erika Bass / Béla Barcza	51
9	(Poland) Stephanie Kalusz / Erwin Kalusz	62.5
10	(Kingdom of Yugoslavia) Silva Palme / Paul Schwab	64

Judges:

- (Kingdom of Yugoslavia) E. Bedetto
- (Poland) J. Kowalski
- (United Kingdom) Ethel Muckelt
- (Nazi Germany) P. Weiss
- (Switzerland) A. Winkler
- (Netherlands) C. Witt
- (Kingdom of Hungary) O. Zöllner
