= 1939 European Figure Skating Championships =

Figure skating competition

1939 European Championships
- Type: ISU Championship
- Season: 1938–39
- Location: Davos, Switzerland (men); London, United Kingdom (ladies); Zakopane, Poland (pairs)

Champions
- Men's singles: (United Kingdom) Graham Sharp
- Ladies' singles: (United Kingdom) Cecilia Colledge
- Pairs: (Nazi Germany) Maxi Herber / Ernst Baier
- Previous: 1938 European Championships
- Next: 1947 European Championships

The 1939 European Figure Skating Championships were held in Davos, Switzerland (men), London, United Kingdom (ladies), and Zakopane, Poland (pairs). Elite senior-level figure skaters from European ISU member nations competed for the title of European Champion in the disciplines of men's singles, ladies' singles, and pair skating.

== Results ==
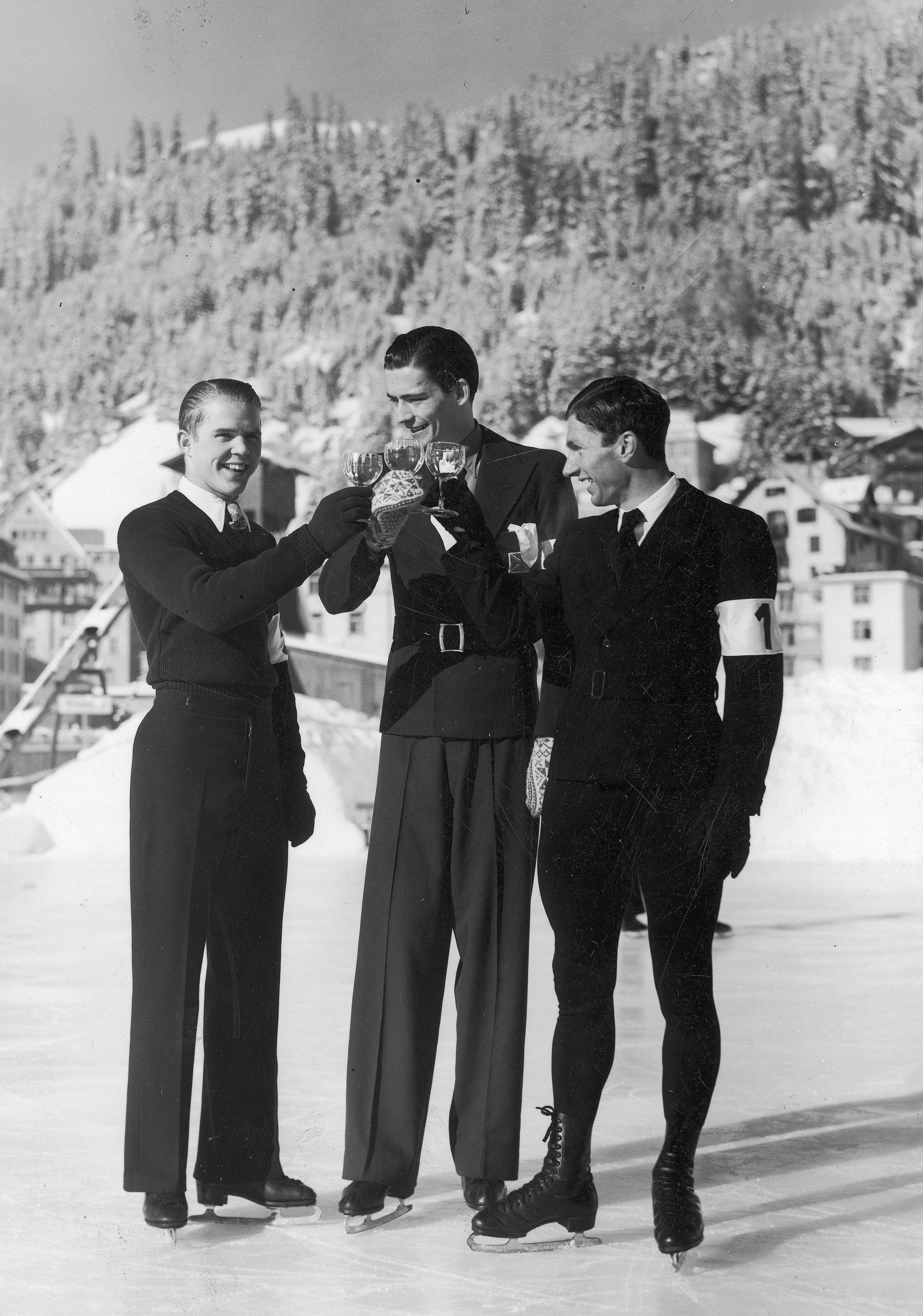
Men's podium

=== Men ===
Rank	Name	Places
1	(United Kingdom) Graham Sharp	
2	(United Kingdom) Freddie Tomlins	
3	(Nazi Germany) Horst Faber	
4	(Austria) Edi Rada	
5	(Switzerland) Hans Gerschwiler	
6	(Sweden) Bo Mothander	
7	(Austria) Emil Ratzenhofer	
8	(Nazi Germany) Franz Loichinger	
9	(Austria) Hellmuth May	
10	(Denmark) Per Cock-Clausen	
11	(United Kingdom) Tony Austin	
12	(United Kingdom) Ian Currie	

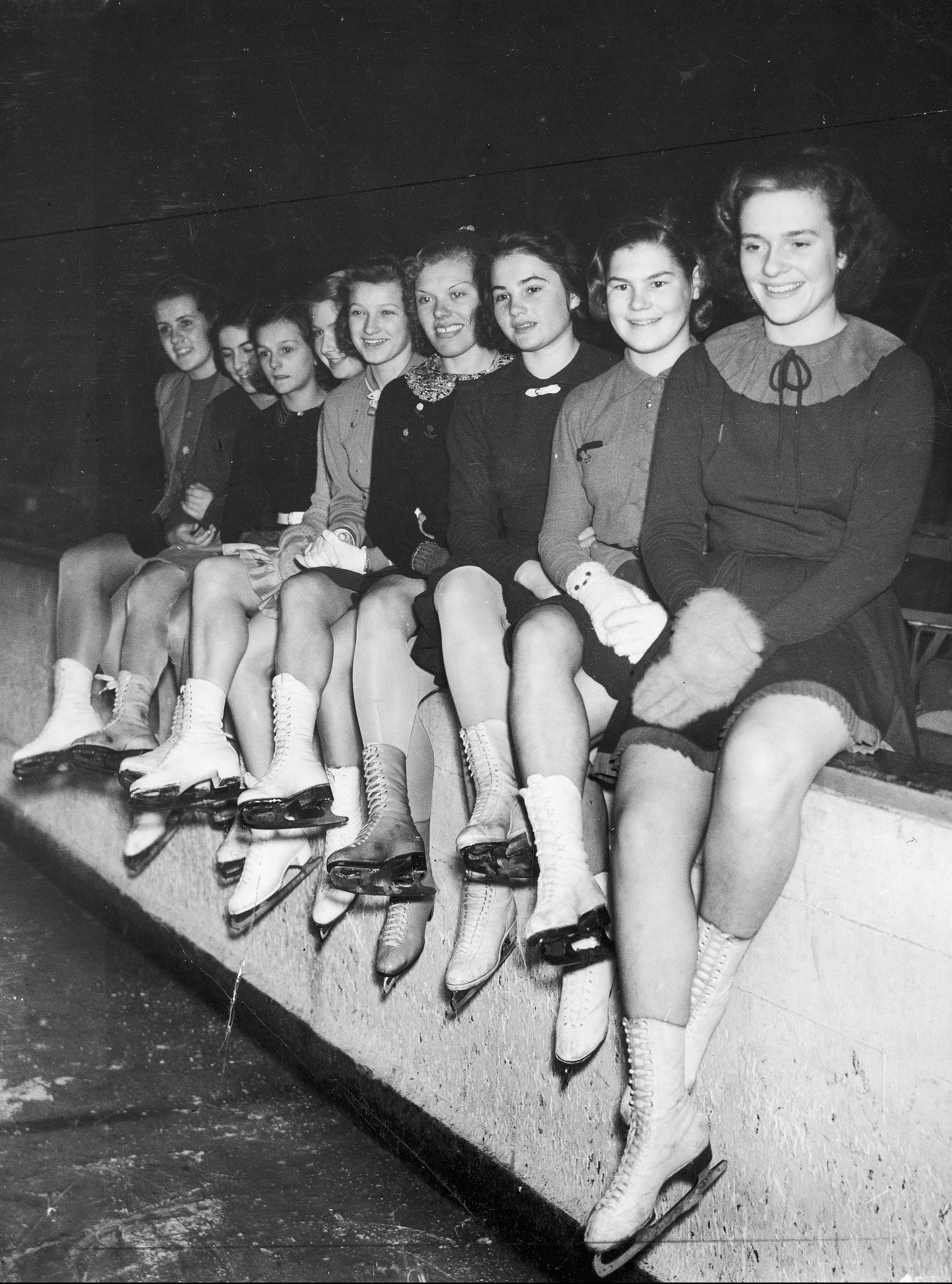
Women competitors

=== Ladies ===
Rank	Name	Places
1	(United Kingdom) Cecilia Colledge	
2	(United Kingdom) Megan Taylor	
3	(United Kingdom) Daphne Walker	
4	(Austria) Hanne Niernberger	
5	(Austria) Emmy Putzinger	
6	(Switzerland) Angela Anderes	
7	(Czechoslovakia) Eva Nyklová	
8	(United Kingdom) Gladys Jagger	
9	(Austria) Marta Musilek	
10	(Norway) Anne-Marie Sæther	
11	(Sweden) Britta Råhlén	
12	(Czechoslovakia) Eva Katzová	

=== Pairs ===
Rank	Name	Places
1	(Nazi Germany) Maxi Herber / Ernst Baier	
2	(Austria) Ilse Pausin / Erich Pausin	
3	(Nazi Germany) Inge Koch / Günther Noack	
4	(Kingdom of Hungary) Erika Bass / Béla Barcza	
5	(Poland) Stephanie Kalusz / Erwin Kalusz	
6	(Nazi Germany) Gisela Grätz / Otto Weiß	
7	(Kingdom of Yugoslavia) Silva Palme / Paul Schwab	
8	(Romania) Trude Heuchert / Guber Heuchert	
9	(Romania) Ileana Moldovan / Alfred Eisenbeisser	
