= Camel spin =

Figure skating spin position

Figure skating element
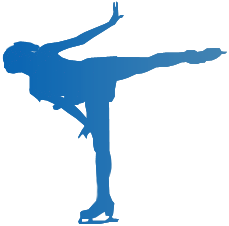
- Element name: Camel spin
- Alternative name: Parallel spin
- Scoring abbreviation: CSp
- Element type: Spin

The camel spin (also called the parallel spin) is one of the three basic figure skating spin positions. British figure skater Cecilia Colledge was the first to perform it. The camel spin, for the first ten years after it was created, was performed mostly by women, although American skater Dick Button performed the first forward camel spin, a variation of the camel spin, and made it a regular part of the repertoire performed by male skaters. The camel spin is executed on one foot, and is an adaptation of the ballet pose the arabesque to the ice. When the camel spin is executed well, the stretch of the skater's body creates a slight arch or straight line. Skaters increase the difficulty of camel spins in a variety of ways.

== Description ==
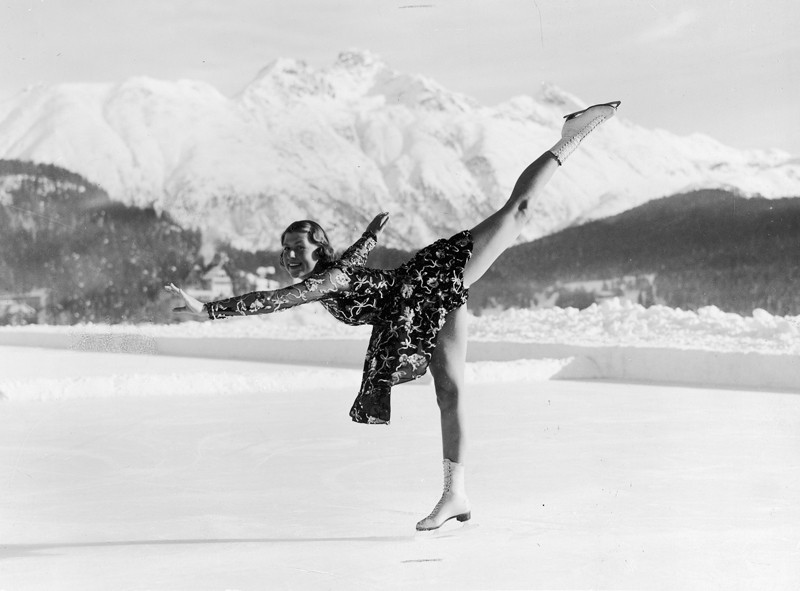
Cecilia Colledge, 1938

The camel spin is one of the three basic figure skating spin positions. British figure skater Cecilia Colledge was the first to perform it, in the mid-1930s. The camel spin, also called the "parallel spin", was borrowed directly from the ballet pose, the arabesque, but adapted to the ice. Writer Ellyn Kestnbaum speculates that the camel and layback spins, which "heightened the visual function of the skater creating interesting shapes with her body", were, for the first ten years after their inventions, performed mostly by women because it was thought to be easier for women to achieve than it was for men. American skater Dick Button, however, performed the first forward camel spin, a variation of the camel spin, and made it a regular part of the repertoire performed by male skaters.

The most important difference between the sit spin and the camel spin is that the skater enters the sit spin directly instead of first developing a slow part at the beginning of the entry. The camel spin is executed on one foot, with the torso and the free leg stretched in opposite directions, parallel to the ice at hip level, similar to the arabesque position. The skater's skating leg is slightly bent or straight, their body is bent forward, and their free leg is bent upward or extended on a horizontal line or higher. When executed well, the stretch of their body should create a slight arch or straight line. Camel spins tend to rotate more slowly than other spins because the circumference of the camel spin's rotation is much greater than in other spin positions, so a prolonged and fast camel spin requires a great deal of technique and skill.

The preparation and entry phases of the camel spin are similar to the preparation and entry phases of the upright spin. At the end of the entry, the skater begins to spin by executing small circles on the backward inside edge of the skate while their shoulders and hips rotate at the same angular velocity. Their skating knee extends, and their body rises in a locked position. Then their body stretches upward toward the head and neck while the skating leg, which is locked and straight, pushes forward.

== Gallery ==
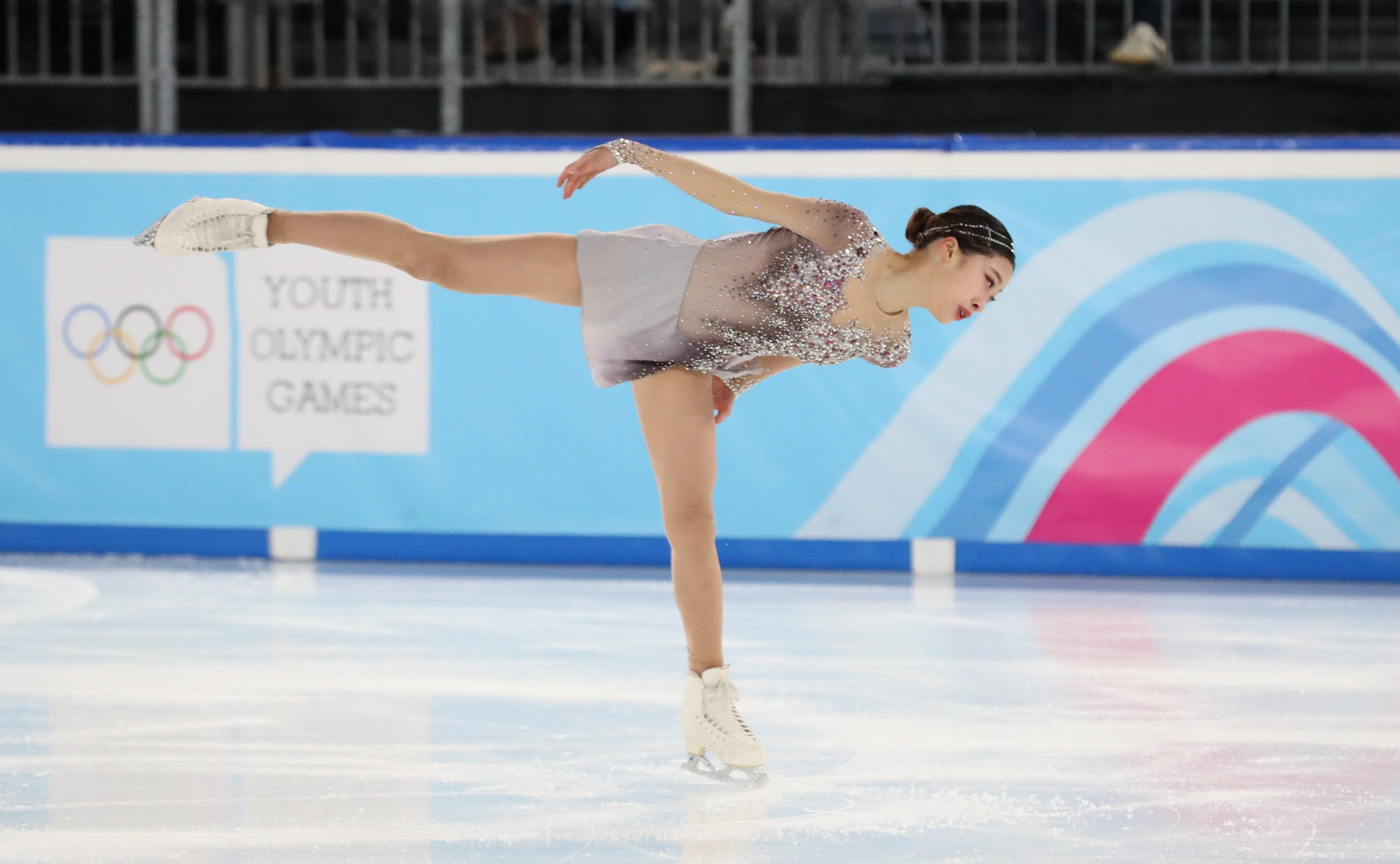
Camel spin
(You Young)

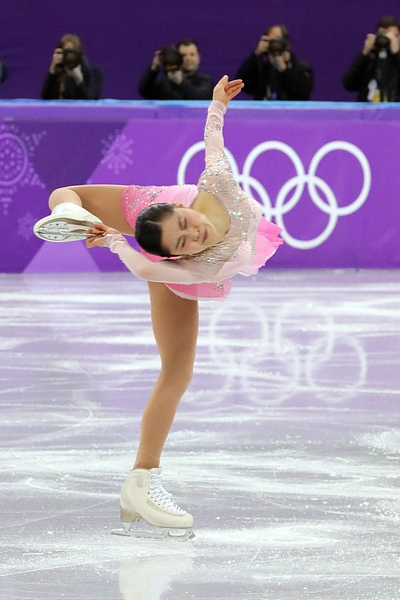
Donut spin
(Satoko Miyahara)

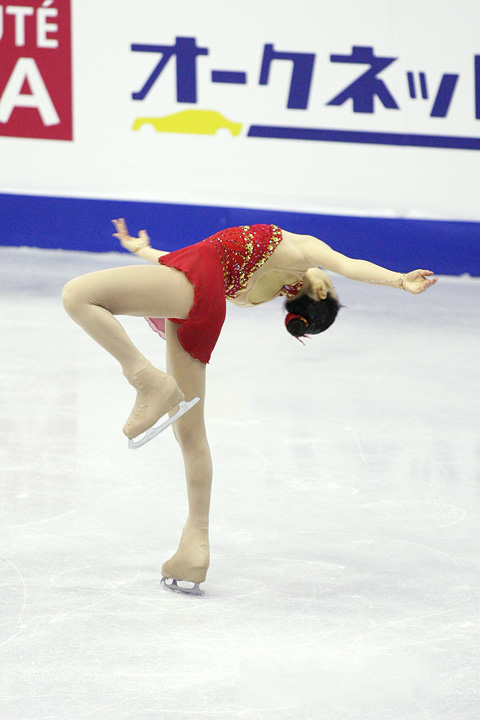
Bent-leg layover camel spin
(Yuna Kim)

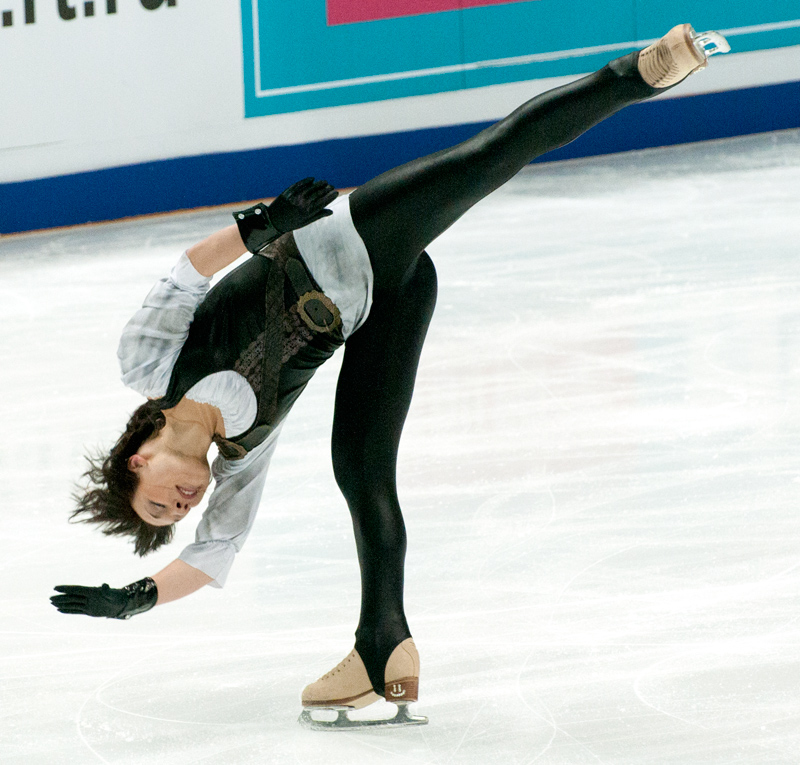
Swinging camel spin
(Alena Leonova)

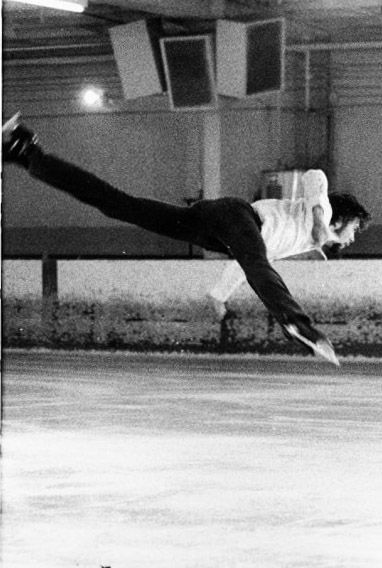
Flying camel spin
(Robert Bradshaw)

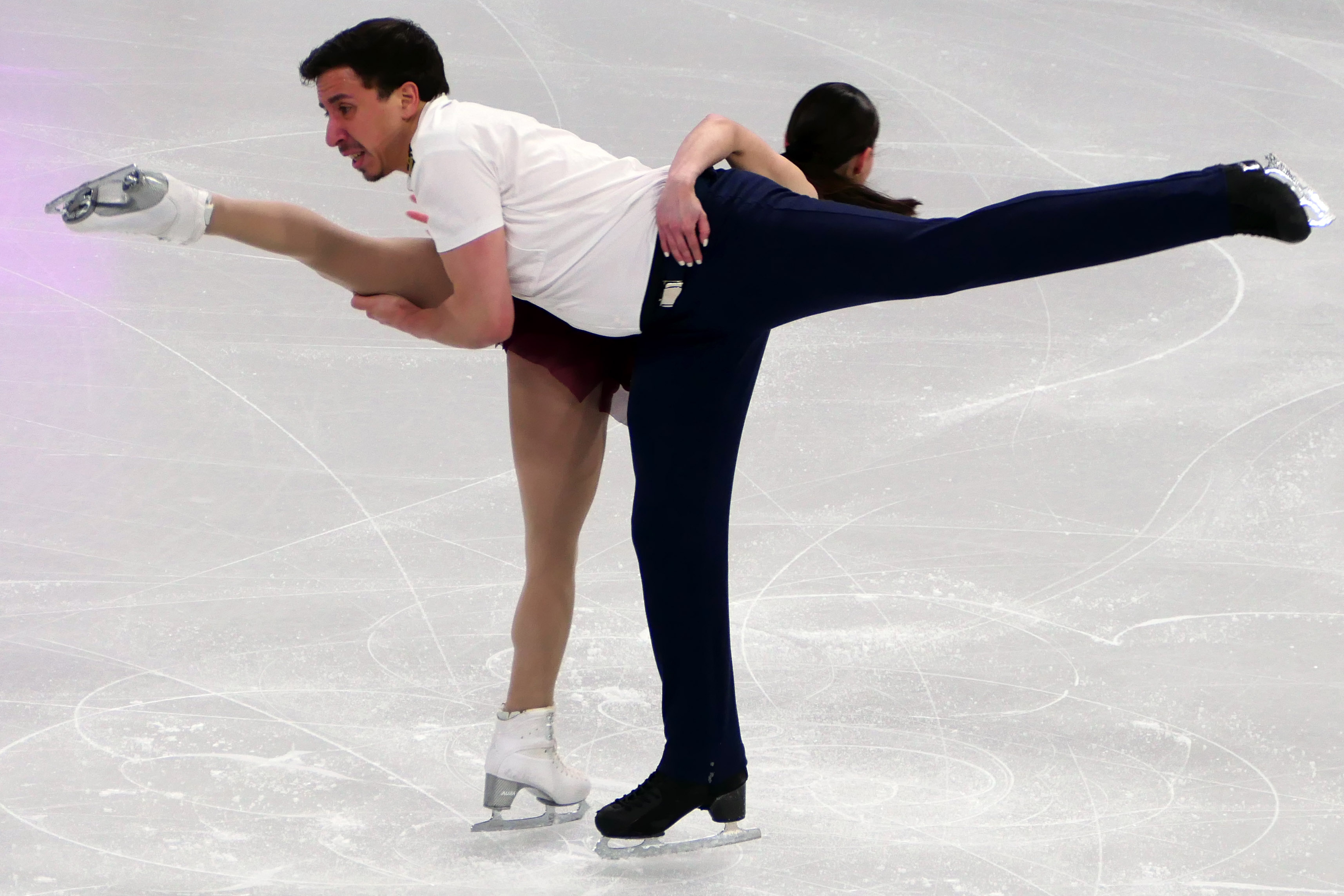
Pairs camel spin
(Valentina Plazas & Maximiliano Fernandez)

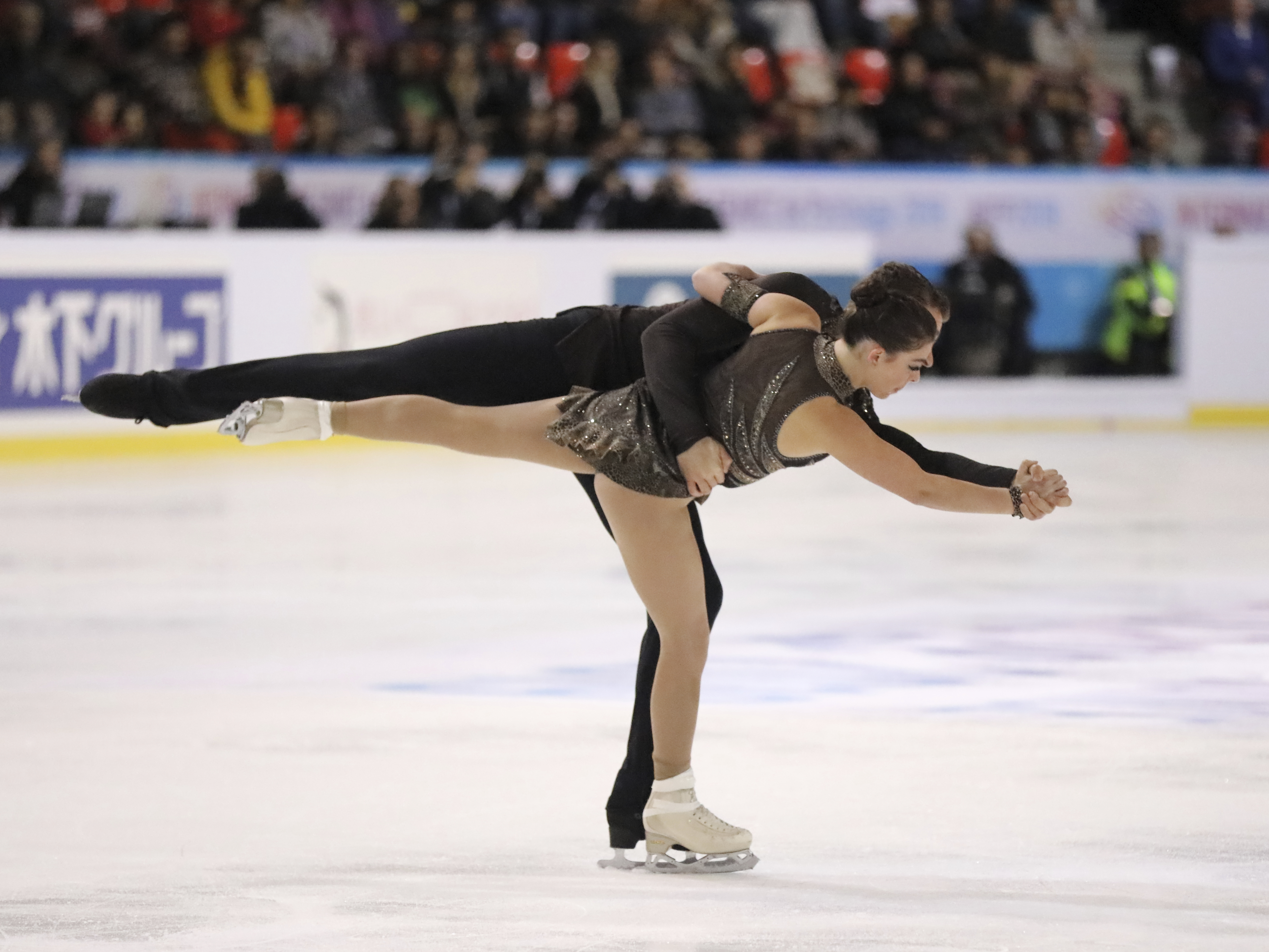
Pairs camel spin
(Haven Denney & Brandon Frazier)

== Works cited ==
- Cabell, Lee; Bateman, Erica (2018). "Biomechanics in Figure Skating". In Vescovi, Jason D.; VanHeest, Jaci L. (eds.). The Science of Figure Skating. New York: Routledge Publishing. pp. 13–34. ISBN 978-1-138-22986-0.
- Hines, James R. (2006). Figure Skating: A History. Urbana, Illinois: University of Illinois Press. ISBN 978-0-252-07286-4.
- Kestnbaum, Ellyn (2003). Culture on Ice: Figure Skating and Cultural Meaning. Middletown, Connecticut: Wesleyan University Press. ISBN 0819566411.
