= Megan Taylor =

British figure skater

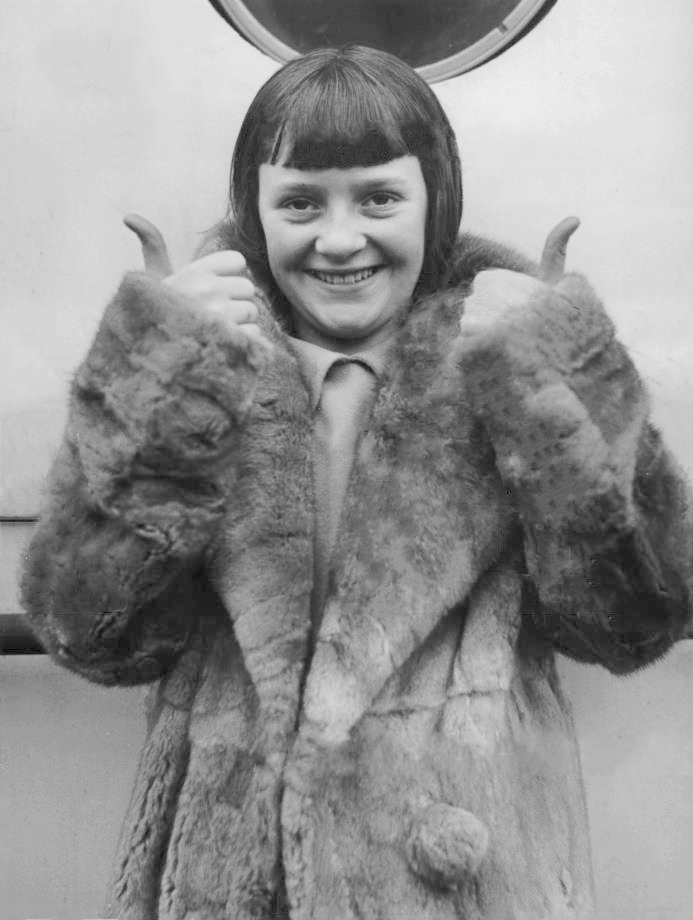
- Taylor in 1932

Personal information
- Full name: Megan Devenish Taylor
- Born: 25 October 1920 Rochdale, England
- Died: 23 July 1993 (aged 72) Jamaica
- Height: 157 cm (5 ft 2 in)

Figure skating career
- Country: United Kingdom
- Retired: 1945
Medal record
Ladies' Figure skating
Representing Great Britain
World Championships
Gold medal – first place	1939 Prague	Ladies' singles
Gold medal – first place	1938 Stockholm	Ladies' singles
Silver medal – second place	1937 London	Ladies' singles
Silver medal – second place	1936 Paris	Ladies' singles
Silver medal – second place	1934 Oslo	Ladies' singles
European Championships
Silver medal – second place	1939 London	Ladies' singles
Silver medal – second place	1938 St. Moritz	Ladies' singles
Silver medal – second place	1937 Prague	Ladies' singles
Bronze medal – third place	1936 Berlin	Ladies' singles

Megan Olwen Devenish Taylor (later Mandeville, later Ellis, 25 October 1920 – 23 July 1993) was a British figure skater competitive in the 1930s. She won the World Championships in 1938 and 1939. Her father was Phil Taylor, a speed skater.

== Career ==
Megan and fellow Brit Cecilia Colledge participated in the 1932 Winter Olympics. They were virtually the same age—Colledge was 11 years and 68 days old, and Taylor was 11 years and 102 days. They are the youngest ever female competitors in any Olympic sport and the youngest ever competitors at the Winter Olympics. Taylor finished seventh, with Colledge following in eighth in the singles competition. Sonja Henie, the dominant figure in women's figure skating at the time, won her second Olympic gold medal here.

Taylor finished second behind Henie at the World Championships in 1934 and 1936. After Henie retired in 1936, Taylor and Colledge competed for prominence. Colledge won the Worlds in 1937, while Taylor won in 1938 and 1939. Taylor placed second behind Colledge three times at the European Championships (1937, 1938, and 1939).

After her retirement from amateur competition, Taylor toured with the Ice Capades.

== Competitive highlights ==
Event	1932	1933	1934	1935	1936	1937	1938	1939
Winter Olympic Games	7th							
World Championships	7th	4th	2nd		2nd	2nd	1st	1st
European Championships			4th		3rd	2nd	2nd	2nd
British Championships	1st	1st	1st	*	*	2nd	2nd	2nd

*Did not participate
