= Felix Kaspar =

Austrian figure skater (1915–2003)

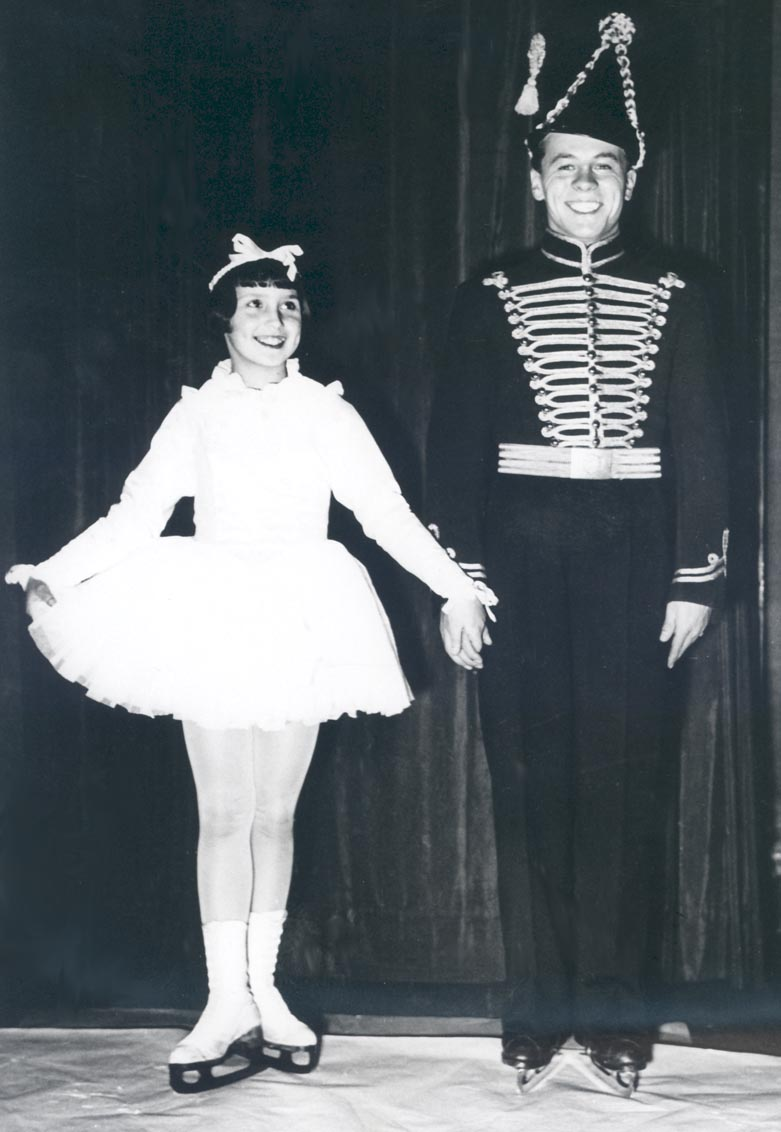
- World Champion Felix Kaspar together with child prodigy and later European Champion Eva Pawlik ("The Fairy Tale of the Steady Tin Soldier", Vienna 1937)

Personal information
- Born: January 14, 1915
- Died: December 5, 2003 (aged 88)

Figure skating career
- Country: Austria
Medal record
Representing Austria
Men's Figure skating
Olympic Games
Bronze medal – third place	1936 Garmisch-Partenkirchen	Singles
World Championships
Gold medal – first place	1937 London	Singles
Gold medal – first place	1938 Berlin	Singles
Bronze medal – third place	1936 Paris	Singles
European Championships
Gold medal – first place	1937 Prague	Singles
Gold medal – first place	1938 St. Moritz	Singles
Silver medal – second place	1935 St. Moritz	Singles

Felix Kaspar (January 14, 1915 in Vienna, Austria – December 5, 2003 in Bradenton, Florida, U.S.) was an Austrian figure skater, a twice World champion, and the bronze medalist in 1936.

Kaspar began figure skating at the age of 9. He trained on the artificial ice rink of Eduard Engelmann Jr. Kaspar was renowned for his impressive high jumps.

At the outset of World War II, Kaspar was in Australia, where he met his future wife, June. The couple remained married for 54 years and had one daughter named Cherie. Kaspar spent the entirety of World War II in Australia.

During the late 1950s and early 1960s, Kaspar taught in Hershey, Pennsylvania. In 1965, he relocated with his family to Minneapolis, Minnesota, and worked as a coach at the figure skating center in Golden Valley within the Twin Cities. Among others, he coached the Japanese skater Emi Watanabe during his time there.

In 1977, he and his family moved to Pasadena, California, where he continued to work as a figure skating coach.

In 1998, Kaspar was admitted to the World Figure Skating Hall of Fame.

In 1989, Kaspar and his wife retired to Florida.

Kaspar died at the age of 88 while battling Alzheimer's disease.

== Results ==
International
Event	1934	1935	1936	1937	1938
Winter Olympics			3rd		
World Championships			3rd	1st	1st
European Championships	7th	2nd	4th	1st	1st
National
Austrian Championships		1st		1st	1st

== See also ==
- World Figure Skating Championships
- List of Jewish figure skaters
