= Graham Sharp =

British figure skater

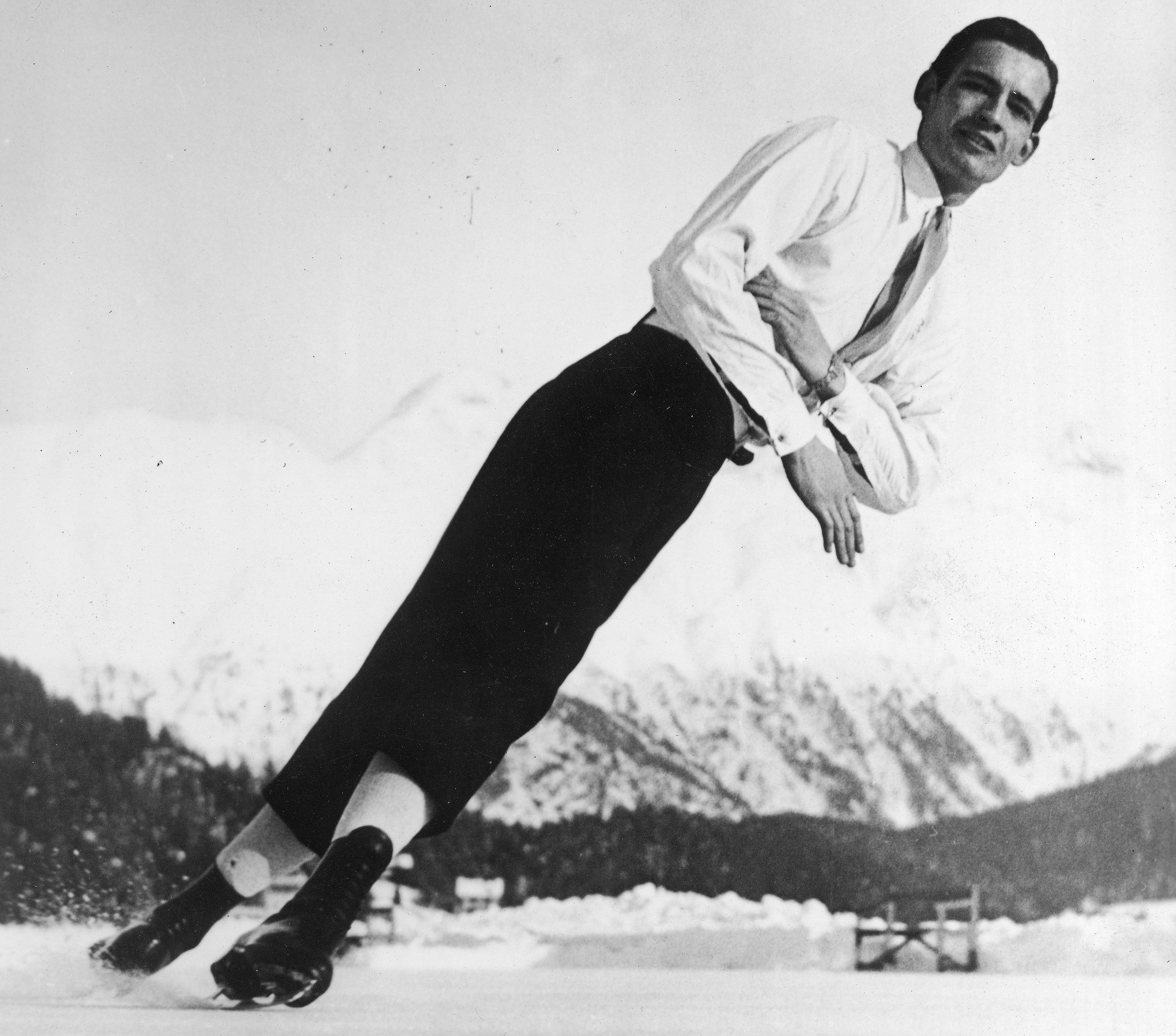
- Sharp performing an inside edge spread eagle at the 1938 European Championships

Personal information
- Born: Henry Graham Sharp; 19 December 1917 Bournemouth, England
- Died: 2 January 1995 (aged 77)

Figure skating career
- Country: United Kingdom
Medal record
Representing United Kingdom
Men's Figure skating
World Championships
| Gold medal – first place | 1939 Budapest | Men's singles |
| Silver medal – second place | 1936 Paris | Men's singles |
| Silver medal – second place | 1937 London | Men's singles |
| Silver medal – second place | 1938 Berlin | Men's singles |
European Championships
| Gold medal – first place | 1939 London | Men's singles |
| Silver medal – second place | 1936 Berlin | Men's singles |
| Silver medal – second place | 1937 Prague | Men's singles |
| Silver medal – second place | 1938 St. Moritz | Men's singles |

Henry Graham Sharp (19 December 1917 – 2 January 1995) was a British figure skater. In 1939, he won both the European Figure Skating Championships and the World Figure Skating Championships. Before that, he had won three consecutive silver medals at Worlds and Europeans. He competed at the 1936 Winter Olympics, where he placed fifth, and at the 1948 Winter Olympics, where he placed seventh.

== Life and career ==
Born in Bournemouth, Sharp began training as a skater at the age of 13 at a rink owned by his father in Bournemouth. At the age of 15 he competed for the first time in the British Figure Skating Championships (BFSC), winning silver in 1933. He competed in the BFSC eight more times, winning gold each time in 1934, 1935, 1936, 1937, 1938, 1939, 1946, and 1948. On the international stage he won consecutive silver medals at the World Championships and the European Championships from 1936 through 1938, and took home gold in both events in 1939. Writing in 1938, T. D. Richardson (author of Modern Figure Skating and Ice Rink Skating) said "Graham Sharp is by far the best male School Skater of the day. He has an ease and accuracy that is a joy to those with real knowledge and appreciation of the fine points of the School Figures." It was predicted that he would have won gold in the winter Olympic Games in 1940, but the events of World War II prevented those games from occurring and otherwise significantly interrupted his career when he was at his peak as an athlete.

Sharp was a captain in the Royal Army Service Corps during WWII. He was at the Battle of France and was part of the Dunkirk evacuation in May and June 1940. He was later part of military campaigns in North Africa and Italy during the war. After the war, he continued his skating career, and while he won gold at the BFSC twice, he did not medal at the Winter Olympic Games and World Championships in 1948. He carried the British flag in the opening ceremonies of the Winter Olympics.

Sharp's father died in 1948, and he took over the management of the family's Bournemouth skating rink where he also taught lessons through 1964. He then relocated to the United States where he worked as a teacher. He died on 2 January 1995 at the age of 77.

== Results ==
| Event | 1934 | 1935 | 1936 | 1937 | 1938 | 1939 | 1946 | 1948 |
|---|---|---|---|---|---|---|---|---|
| Winter Olympic Games | | | 5th | | | | | 7th |
| World Championships | 6th | 4th | 2nd | 2nd | 2nd | 1st | | 6th |
| European Championships | | | 2nd | 2nd | 2nd | 1st | | |
| British Championships | 1st | 1st | 1st | 1st | 1st | 1st | 1st | 1st |
