= Maxi Herber =

German figure skater (1920–2006)

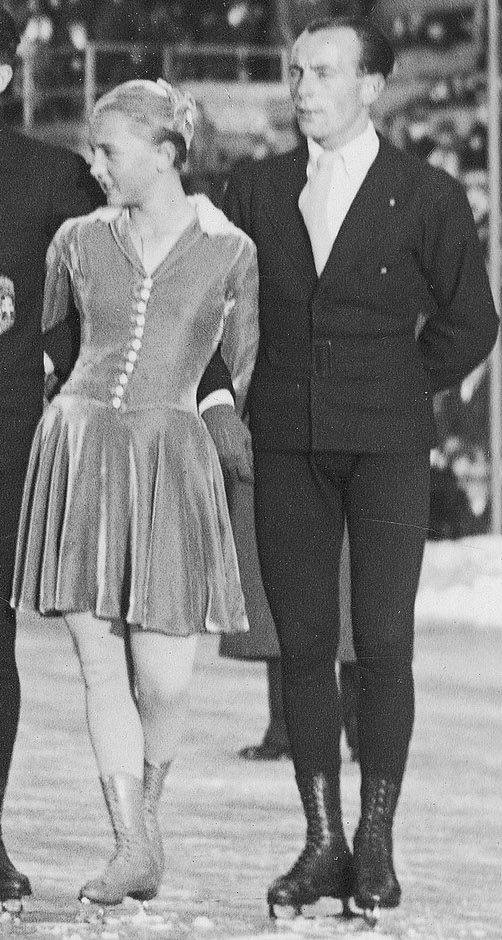
- Herber and Baier at the 1934 World Championships

Personal information
- Born: 8 October 1920 Munich, Bavaria, Germany
- Died: 20 October 2006 (aged 86) Garmisch-Partenkirchen, Bavaria, Germany

Figure skating career
- Country: Germany
- Retired: 1941
Medal record
Representing Germany
Pairs Figure skating
Olympic Games
Gold medal – first place	1936 Garmisch-Partenkirchen	Pairs
World Championships
Gold medal – first place	1939 Budapest	Pairs
Gold medal – first place	1938 Berlin	Pairs
Gold medal – first place	1937 Vienna	Pairs
Gold medal – first place	1936 Paris	Pairs
Bronze medal – third place	1934 Helsinki	Pairs
European Championships
Gold medal – first place	1939 London	Pairs
Gold medal – first place	1938 St. Moritz	Pairs
Gold medal – first place	1937 Prague	Pairs
Gold medal – first place	1936 Berlin	Pairs
Gold medal – first place	1935 St. Moritz	Pairs

Maxi Herber (8 October 1920 – 20 October 2006) was a German figure skater who competed in pair skating and single skating. She remains the youngest figure skating Olympic champion (at the age of 15 years and 128 days) from when she won gold in pair skating together with Ernst Baier at the 1936 Winter Olympics.

Born in Munich, Herber was also an accomplished single skater, winning the German nationals three times, from 1933 to 1935. She skated for the Münchner EV (Munich EV) club.

Skating with Baier, she won seven national titles, five European titles, and four World titles, in addition to their Olympic gold. Herber later sold her Olympic gold medal and donated the money to survivors of the Holocaust. The pair performed several side-by-side jumps, including side-by-side Axel jumps at the 1934 Championships, likely the first side-by-side Axels competed by a pair at an ISU championship. They also developed a 'Baier lift', which was similar to a twist lift but lacking a release of Herber into the air.

Herber and Baier married after their skating career ended in 1940. They had three children. After World War II they skated in ice shows; they created their own, which was later sold to Holiday on Ice. In 1964 they were divorced. She worked as a coach, then supported by public welfare and the "Deutsche Sporthilfe" (German Sport help organisation), she moved to Oberau near Garmisch-Partenkirchen in Bavaria. Some years later Herber and Baier remarried, but they divorced again.

Herber suffered from Parkinson's disease. In 2000, she moved to the Lenzheim retirement home in Garmisch-Partenkirchen, where she held an exhibition of her watercolor paintings. She died in 2006 at age 86.

== Results ==
(ladies singles)

Event	1933	1934	1935	1936	1937	1938
World Championships		7th				
European Championships			4th	7th		4th
German Championships	1st	1st	1st			2nd

(pairs with Ernst Baier)

Event	1934	1935	1936	1937	1938	1939	1940	1941
Winter Olympic Games			1st					
World Championships	3rd		1st	1st	1st	1st		
European Championships		1st	1st	1st	1st	1st		
German Championships	1st	1st	1st		1st	1st	1st	1st
