= Upright spin =

Figure skating position

Figure skating element
- Element name: Upright spin
- Scoring abbreviation: USp
- Element type: Spin

The upright spin is one of the three basic figure skating spin positions. The International Skating Union (ISU), the governing body of figure skating, defines an upright spin as a spin with "any position with the skating leg extended or slightly bent which is not a camel position". It was invented by British figure skater Cecilia Colledge. Variations of the upright spin include the layback spin, the Biellmann spin, the full layback, the split, the back upright spin, the forward upright spin, the scratchspin, and the sideways leaning spin.

== Description ==
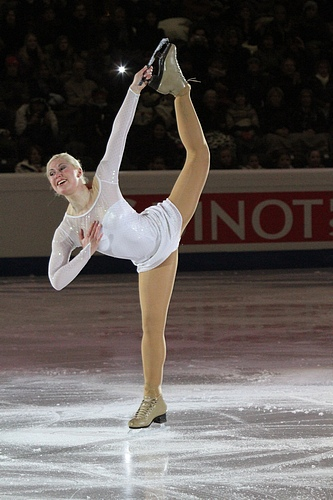
Denise Biellmann, 2011

The International Skating Union (ISU), the governing body of figure skating, defines an upright spin as a spin with "any position with the skating leg extended or slightly bent which is not a camel position". British figure skater Cecilia Colledge was "responsible for the invention" of the spin and the first to execute it. Colledge's coach, Jacques Gerschwiler, who was a former gymnastics teacher and, according to Colledge "very progressive in his ideas", got the idea for the upright spin while watching one of Colledge's trainers, a former circus performer turned acrobatics instructor, train Colledge to perform backbends "by means of a rope tied around her waist". The upright spin has long been associated with women's skating, but men have also performed it. Skaters include it in their programs because it increases its technical content and fulfills choreographic needs.

A variation of the upright spin is the layback spin, executed by holding the free leg in a back attitude position and arching the head and upper body backward so that the skater faces up towards the sky, ceiling, or further. The free leg position is optional. A variation of the layback spin is the Biellmann spin, made popular by world champion Denise Biellmann, which the ISU considers a difficult variation of the layback spin. It is executed by the skater grabbing their free blade and pulling the heel of their boot behind and above the level of the head so that their legs are in an approximate full split, with the head and back arched upward. The spin "requires much strength and extreme flexibility".

Figure skating champion and writer John Misha Petkovich categorizes the upright spin into two further groups: the back upright spin and the forward upright spin. He calls the back upright spin "perhaps the most important spin in skating" because the position skaters execute toward the end of the spin is also executed in the middle of multi-rotational jumps. Petkovich also states that the forward upright spin "may well be the most exciting basic spin in skating". Skaters can attain "unbelievable" speed while performing the upright spin. Due to its speed, it is often the final spin in a program. Other variations of the upright spin is the scratchspin and the sideways leaning spin. The scratchspin gets its name from the scratches made by the blade on the ice, which creates loops or circles on the ice parallel to the tracings made when the skater's weight is centered between the center of the spinning blade and the first tooth of the skate's toepick. When performed extremely quickly, it is also called the blur spin. The sideways leaning spin is executed when the skater's head and shoulders are leaning sideways and their upper body is arched. The free leg position is optional.

The angular velocity of an upright spin is low, about one revolution per second, but its moment of inertia is large during its balancing stage. As the angular velocity increases (up to five revolutions per second), the moment of inertia is decreased as the arms and free leg move towards the center of the spin. At this point, the center of gravity reaches its maximum as the skater stretches vertically, the moment of inertia is at its minimum, and the angular velocity is at its maximum. The skater ends the spin by opening their arms, which increases the moment of inertia, and they exit the spin on a curve.

== Photo gallery of upright spins ==
=== In single skating ===
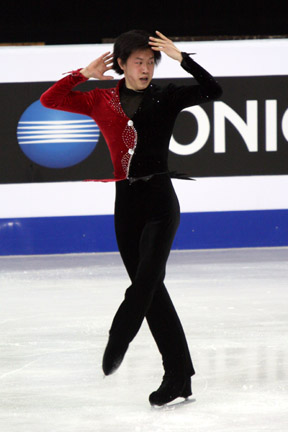
Scratch spin
(Guan Jinlin)

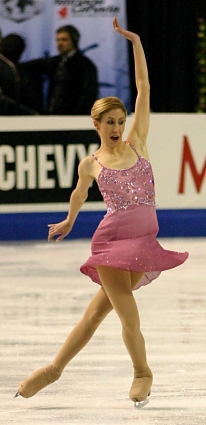
Corkscrew or crossover spin
(Amber Corwin)

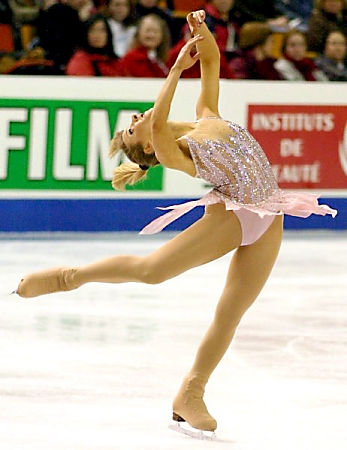
Layback spin
(Angela Nikodinov)

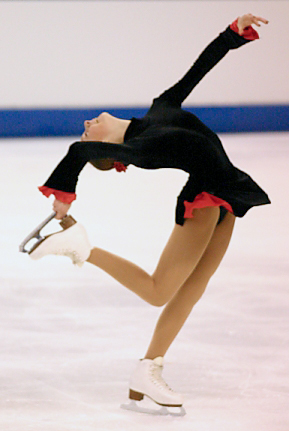
Catch foot layback spin
(Jelena Glebova)

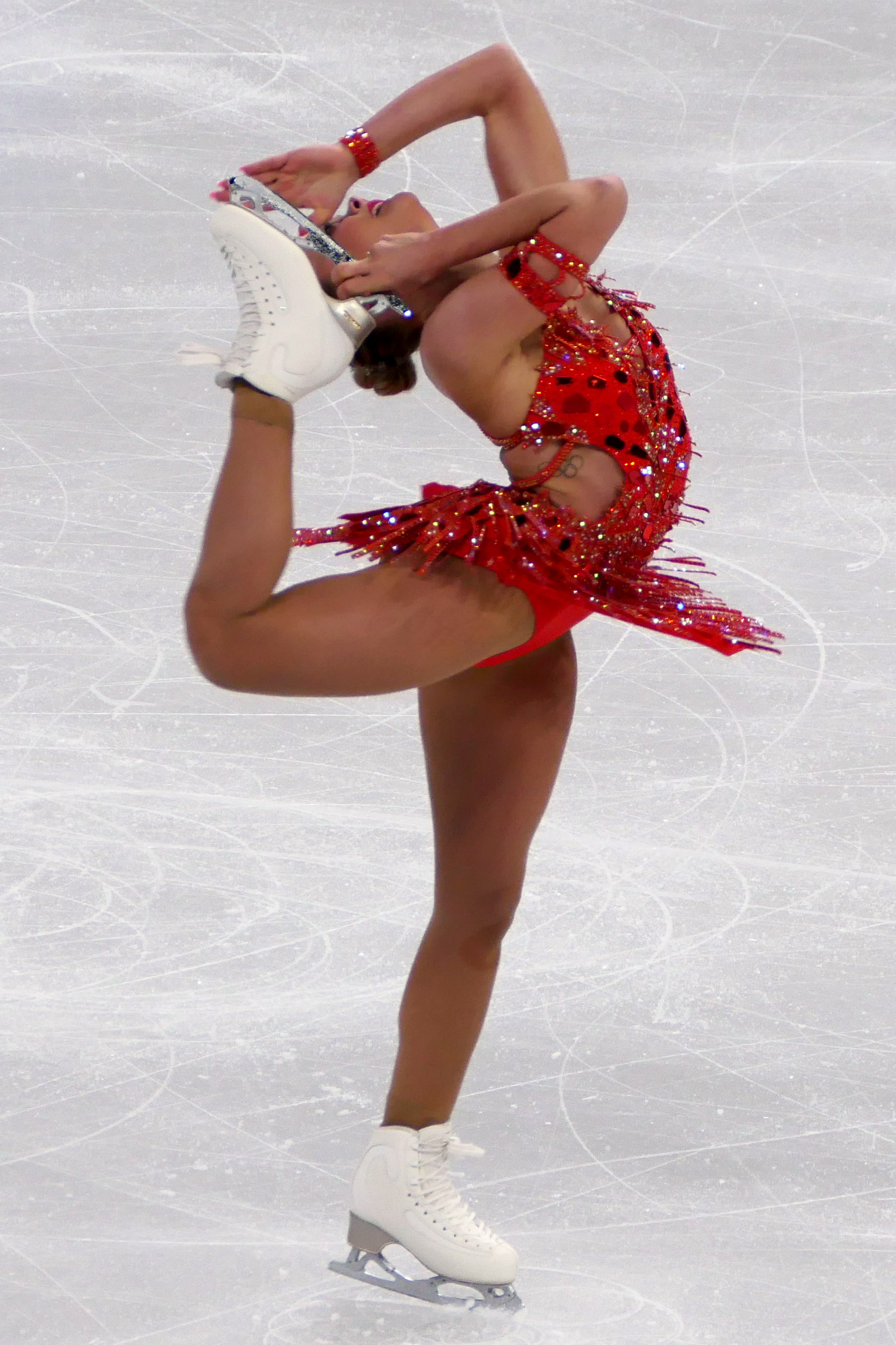
Haircutter spin
(Loena Hendrickx)

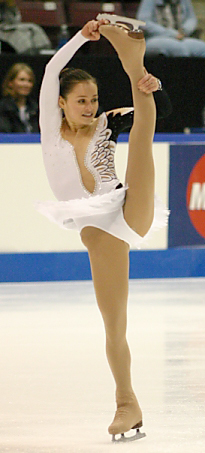
I spin - ankle hold
(Sasha Cohen)

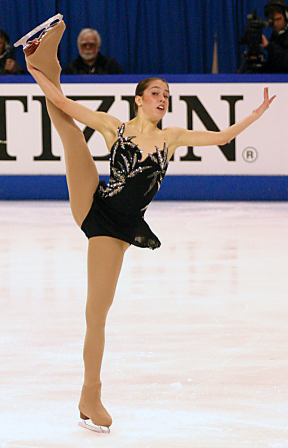
Y spin - ankle hold
(Alissa Czisny)

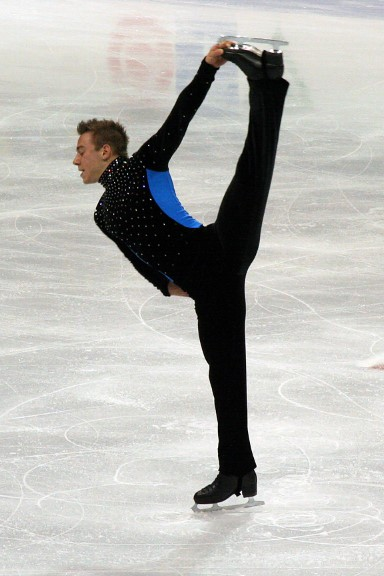
Y spin - skate hold
(Shawn Sawyer)

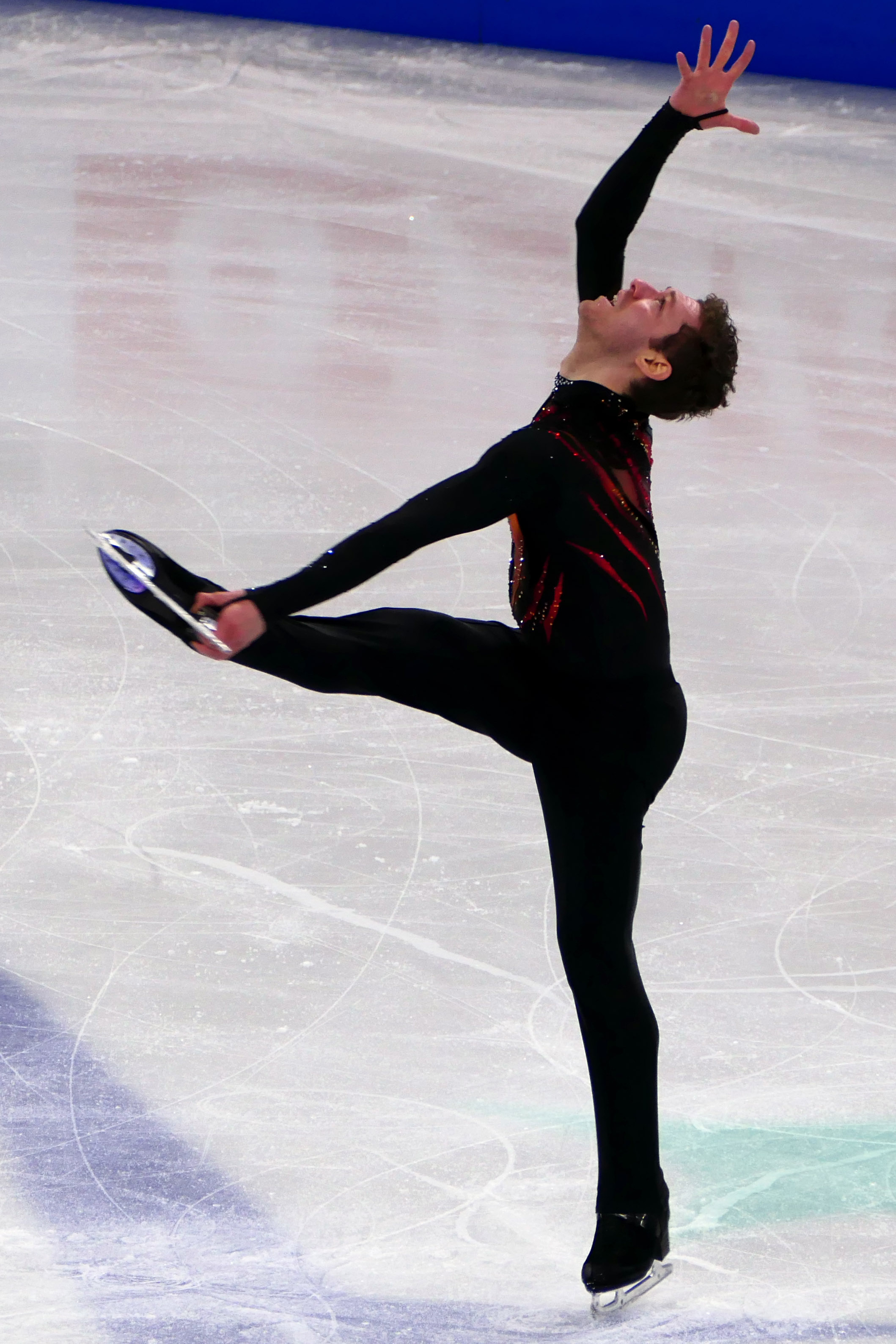
Shotgun spin
(Jason Brown)

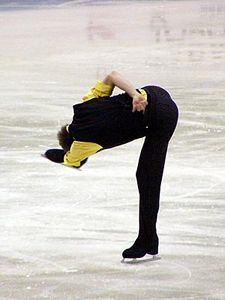
An "A" spin
(Jeffrey Buttle)

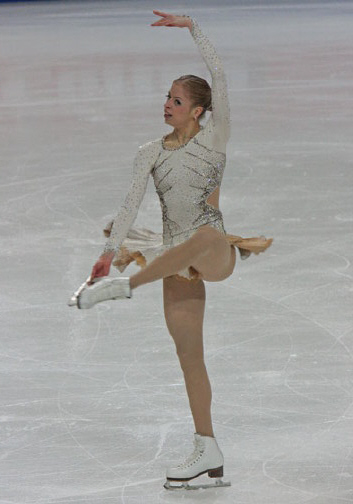
An upright spin variation
(Carolina Kostner)

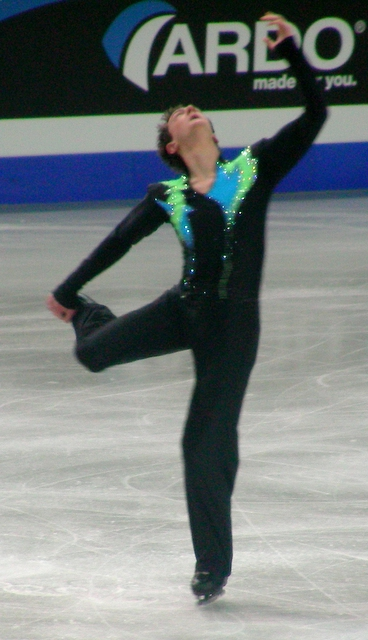
An upright spin variation
(John Hamer)

=== In pair skating and ice dance ===
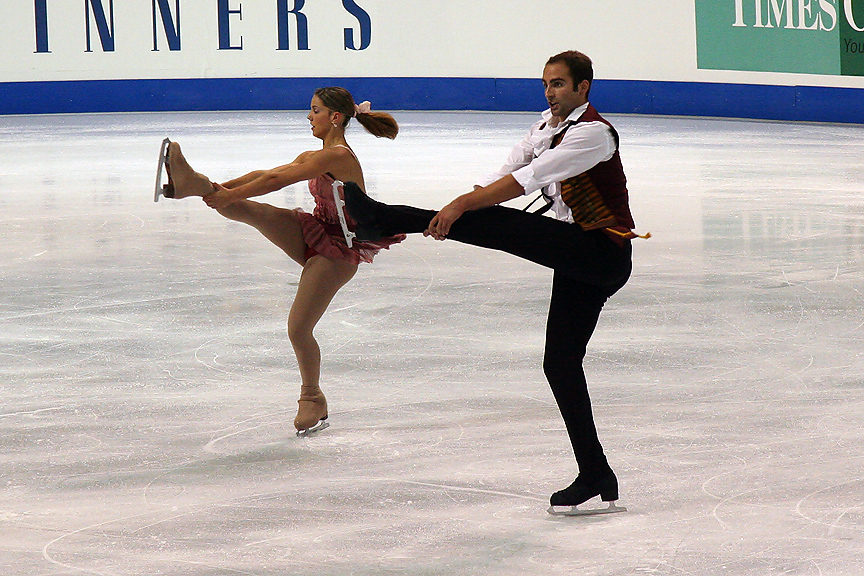
Side by side shotgun spins
(Tiffany Vise & Derek Trent)

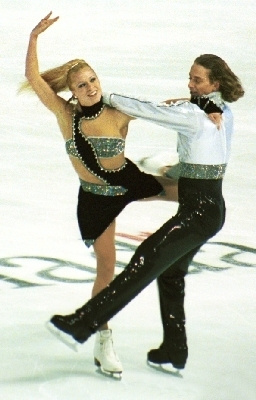
Dance upright spin
(Shae-Lynn Bourne & Viktor Kraatz)

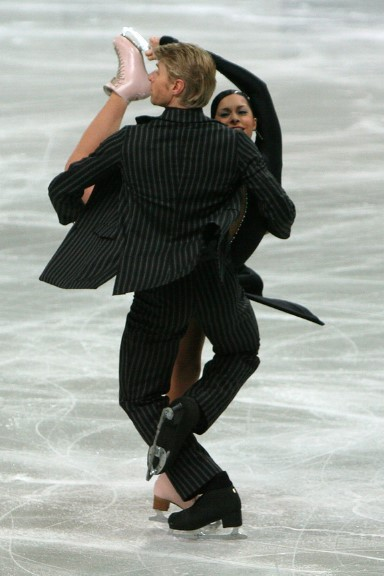
Dance upright and catchfoot spin
(Isabelle Delobel & Olivier Schoenfelder)

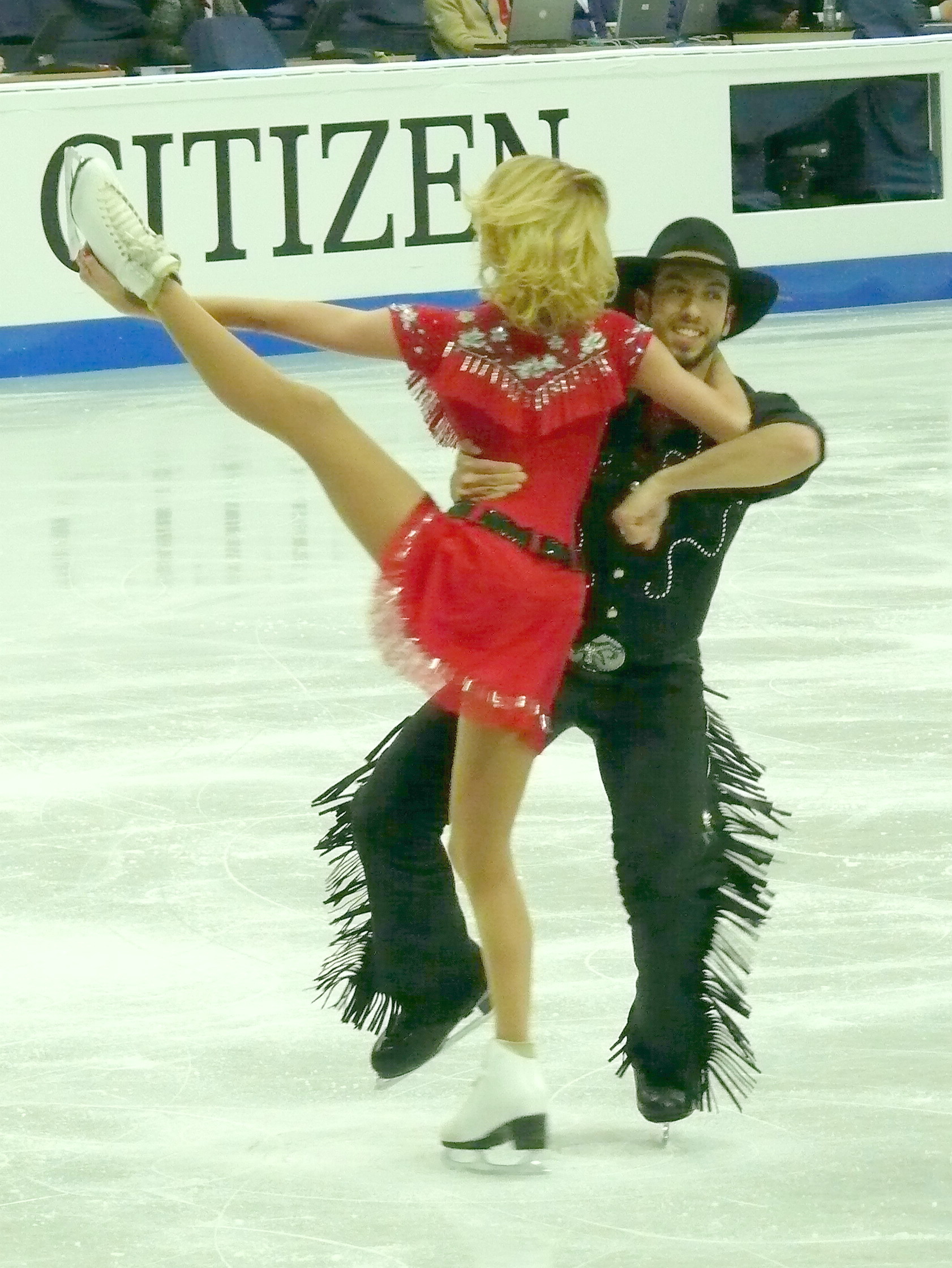
Dance upright and Y-spin
(Tanith Belbin & Benjamin Agosto)

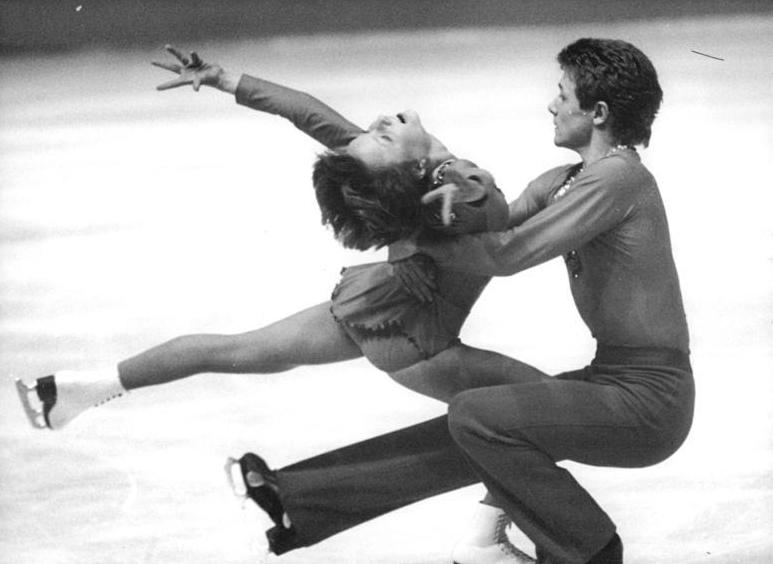
Pair sit and layback (upright variation) spin
(Sabine Baeß & Tassilo Thierbach)

== Works cited ==
- Hines, James R. (2006). Figure Skating: A History. Urbana, Illinois: University of Illinois Press. ISBN 978-0-252-07286-4.
- Kestnbaum, Ellyn (2003). Culture on Ice: Figure Skating and Cultural Meaning. Middletown, Connecticut: Wesleyan University Press. ISBN 0819566411.
- Petkevich, John Misha (1988). Sports Illustrated Figure Skating: Championship Techniques (1st ed.). New York: Sports Illustrated. ISBN 978-1-4616-6440-6. OCLC 815289537.
