= Ernst Baier =

German figure skater (1905–2001)

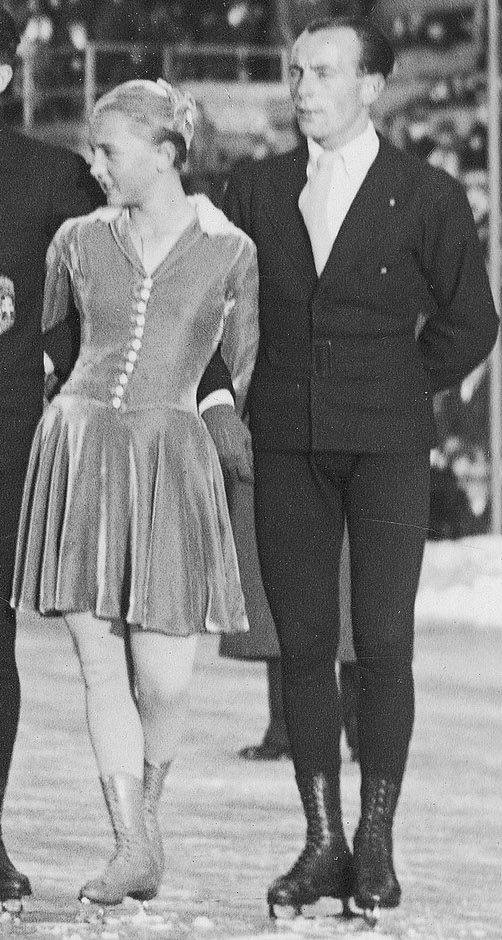
- Herber and Baier at the 1934 World Championships

Personal information
- Born: 27 September 1905 Zittau, German Empire
- Died: 8 July 2001 (aged 95) Garmisch-Partenkirchen, Germany

Figure skating career
- Country: Germany
- Retired: 1941
Medal record
Representing Germany
Men's Figure skating
Olympic Games
Silver medal – second place	1936 Garmisch-Partenkirchen	Singles
World Championships
Silver medal – second place	1933 Zürich	Singles
Silver medal – second place	1934 Stockholm	Singles
Bronze medal – third place	1931 Berlin	Singles
Bronze medal – third place	1932 Montreal	Singles
European Championships
Silver medal – second place	1931 St. Moritz	Singles
Silver medal – second place	1932 Paris	Singles
Silver medal – second place	1933 London	Singles
Bronze medal – third place	1935 St. Moritz	Singles
Bronze medal – third place	1936 Berlin	Singles
German Championships
Gold medal – first place	1933 Opole	Men's singles
Gold medal – first place	1934 Braunlage	Men's singles
Gold medal – first place	1935 Garmisch-Partenkirchen	Men's singles
Gold medal – first place	1936 Garmisch-Partenkirchen	Men's singles
Gold medal – first place	1937 Hamburg	Men's singles
Gold medal – first place	1938 Cologne	Men's singles
Silver medal – second place	1932 Riessersee	Men's singles
Pairs Figure skating
Olympic Games
Gold medal – first place	1936 Garmisch-Partenkirchen	Pairs
World Championships
Gold medal – first place	1936 Paris	Pairs
Gold medal – first place	1937 Vienna	Pairs
Gold medal – first place	1938 Berlin	Pairs
Gold medal – first place	1939 Budapest	Pairs
Bronze medal – third place	1934 Helsinki	Pairs
European Championships
Gold medal – first place	1935 St. Moritz	Pairs
Gold medal – first place	1936 Berlin	Pairs
Gold medal – first place	1937 Prague	Pairs
Gold medal – first place	1938 St. Moritz	Pairs
Gold medal – first place	1939 London	Pairs

Ernst Baier (27 September 1905 in Zittau, Saxony, Germany – 8 July 2001 in Garmisch, Bavaria, Germany) was a German figure skater who competed in pair skating and single skating. He became Olympic pair champion in 1936 together with Maxi Herber. The duo also won several World and European championships.

Ernst Baier skated for the club Berliner SC. He also enjoyed success as a single skater and won silvers at the European, World and Olympic games in singles. He competed at the European Championships in 1929, coming in seventh place, and again in 1930, coming in fifth place. He competed at the World Championships four times, between 1931 and 1934, and won two bronze medals and two silver medals.

Skating with Herber, he won seven national titles, five European titles, and four World titles, in addition to their Olympic gold. The pair performed several side-by-side jumps, including side-by-side Axel jumps at the 1934 Championships, when they won a bronze medal, likely the first side-by-side Axels competed by a pair at an ISU championship. They also developed a 'Baier lift', which was similar to a twist lift but lacking a release of Herber into the air. They did not compete in 1935 due to an injury, but returned in 1936 and as figure skating historian James R. Hines put, "were unbeatable for the remainder of the prewar period". They won the gold medal at the Winter Olympics in 1936.

Herber and Baier married after their skating career ended in 1940. They had three children and divorced in 1964. After World War II they skated in ice shows; they created their own, which was later sold to Holiday on Ice. He also worked as an architect and coach. They were elected to the World Figure Skating Hall of Fame in 1979.

On 15 May 1965 he married the Swedish figure skater Birgitta Wennström (born 10 November 1935 in Enskede, Stockholm, Sweden) known by the stage name "Topsy" from Holiday on Ice together with her partner Steve. They had a daughter in 1968, but divorced in 1973.

Some years later he remarried Maxi Herber, but they later divorced again.

== Results ==
(men's singles)

Event	1929	1930	1931	1932	1933	1934	1935	1936	1937	1938
Winter Olympic Games				5th				2nd		
World Championships			3rd	3rd	2nd	2nd				
European Championships	7th	5th	2nd	2nd	2nd		3rd	3rd		
German Championships	2nd			2nd	1st	1st	1st	1st	1st	1st

(pairs with Maxi Herber)

Event	1934	1935	1936	1937	1938	1939	1940	1941
Winter Olympic Games			1st					
World Championships	3rd		1st	1st	1st	1st		
European Championships		1st	1st	1st	1st	1st		
German Championships	1st	1st	1st		1st	1st	1st	1st
