= Figure skating at the 1936 Winter Olympics =

Figure skating at the IV Winter Olympics
- Type: Olympic Games

Champions
- Men's singles: (Austria) Karl Schäfer
- Ladies' singles: (Norway) Sonja Henie
- Pairs: (Germany) Maxi Herber / Ernst Baier
- Previous: 1932 Winter Olympics
- Next: 1948 Winter Olympics

Figure skating at the 1936 Winter Olympics took place at the Olympia-Kunsteisstadion in Garmisch-Partenkirchen, Bavaria, from 9 to 15 February 1936. Three figure skating events were contested: men's singles, ladies' singles, and pairs skating.

== Medal summary ==
Event	Gold	Silver	Bronze
Men's singles	Karl Schäfer; Austria	Ernst Baier; Germany	Felix Kaspar; Austria
Ladies' singles	Sonja Henie; Norway	Cecilia Colledge; Great Britain	Vivi-Anne Hultén; Sweden
Pairs skating	Maxi Herber and Ernst Baier; Germany	Ilse Pausin and Erik Pausin; Austria	Emília Rotter and László Szollás; Hungary

== Medal table ==
Rank	Nation	Gold	Silver	Bronze	Total
1	Austria	1	1	1	3
2	Germany	1	1	0	2
3	Norway	1	0	0	1
4	Great Britain	0	1	0	1
5	Hungary	0	0	1	1
5	Sweden	0	0	1	1
Totals (6 entries)		3	3	3	9

== Participating nations ==
Only three figure skaters (two men and one lady) competed in both the singles and the pairs event.

A total of 84 figure skaters (41 men and 43 ladies) from 17 nations (men from 16 nations and ladies from 16 nations) competed at the Garmisch-Partenkirchen Games:

- Austria (12) (men 6, women 6)
- Belgium (4) (men 1, women 3)
- Canada (6) (men 3, women 3)
- Czechoslovakia (3) (men 1, women 2)
- Estonia (2) (men 1, women 1)
- Finland (1) (men 1, women 0)
- Germany (7) (men 3, women 4)
- Great Britain (12) (men 6, women 6)
- Hungary (7) (men 4, women 3)
- Italy (2) (men 1, women 1)
- Japan (5) (men 4, women 1)
- Latvia (4) (men 2, women 2)
- Norway (4) (men 1, women 3)
- Romania (3) (men 2, women 1)
- Sweden (1) (men 0, women 1)
- Switzerland (2) (men 1, women 1)
- United States (9) (men 4, women 5)
