= Erle Reiter =

American figure skater

Erle Charles Reiter (December 29, 1916 in Minneapolis, MN – December 3, 2008 in Bloomington, MN) was an American figure skater. He began skating as a seven-year-old. He went on to become a three-time silver medalist at the U.S. Figure Skating Championships and competed at the 1936 Winter Olympics. He died in 2008 and is buried in Lakewood Cemetery in Minneapolis.

== Results ==
Event	1936	1937	1938
Winter Olympics	13th		
World Championships	11th		
U.S. Championships	2nd	2nd	2nd
