= Cecilia Colledge =

British figure skater (1920–2008)

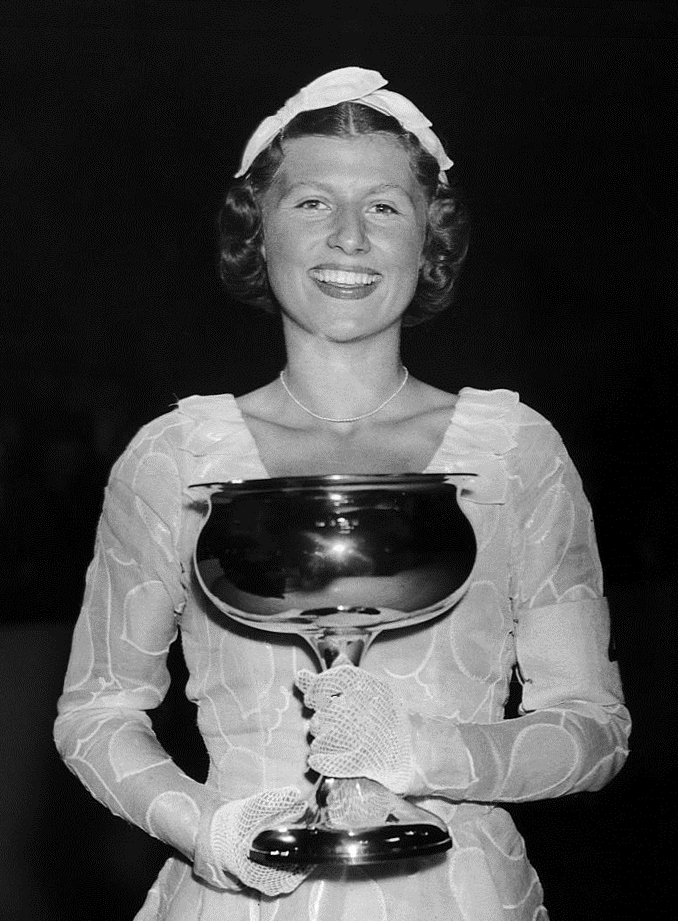
- Cecilia Colledge in 1937

Personal information
- Full name: Magdalena Cecilia Colledge
- Born: 28 November 1920 London, England
- Died: 12 April 2008 (aged 87) Cambridge, Massachusetts, U.S.
- Height: 152 cm (5 ft 0 in)

Figure skating career
- Country: Great Britain
- Coach: Jacques Gerschwiler; Eva Keats (former)
- Skating club: Queens Park Ice Rink
- Retired: 1946
Medal record
Representing Great Britain
Ladies' singles figure skating
Olympic Games
Silver medal – second place	1936 Garmisch-Partenkirchen	Ladies' singles
World Championships
Silver medal – second place	1938 Stockholm	Ladies' singles
Gold medal – first place	1937 London	Ladies' singles
Silver medal – second place	1935 Vienna	Ladies' singles
European Championships
Gold medal – first place	1939 London	Ladies' singles
Gold medal – first place	1938 St. Moritz	Ladies' singles
Gold medal – first place	1937 Prague	Ladies' singles
Silver medal – second place	1936 Berlin	Ladies' singles
Bronze medal – third place	1935 St. Moritz	Ladies' singles
Silver medal – second place	1933 London	Ladies' singles

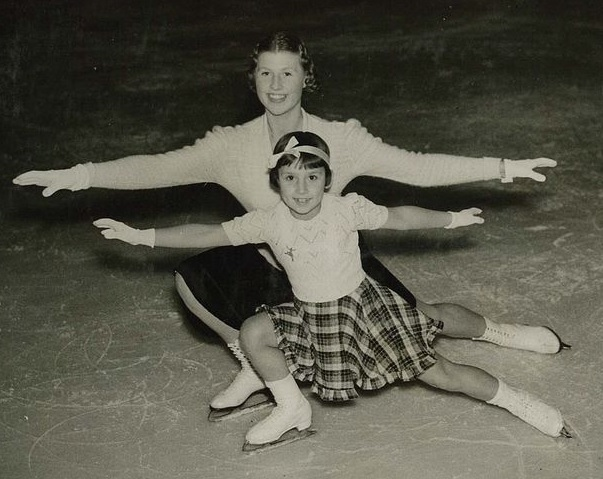
Colledge with Austrian figure skater Eva Pawlik (1937)

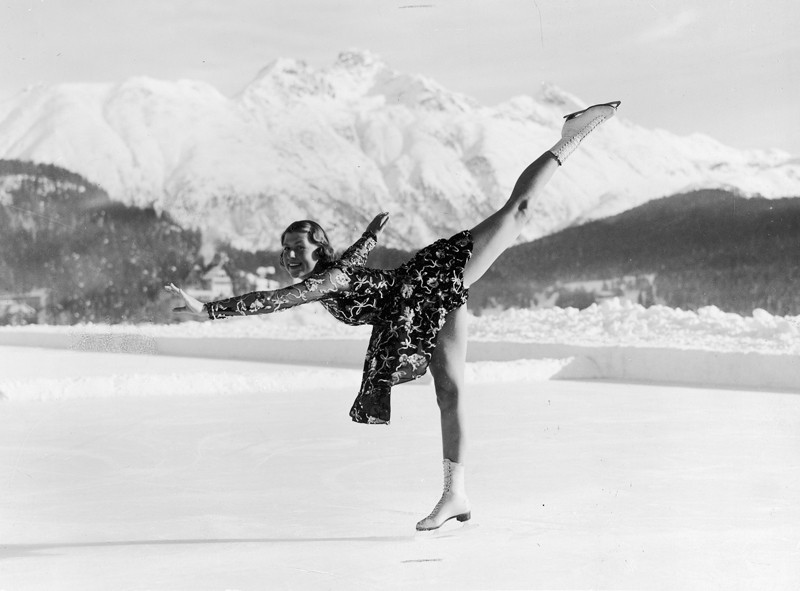
Colledge in 1938

Magdalena Cecilia Colledge (28 November 1920 – 12 April 2008) was a British figure skater. She was the 1936 Olympic silver medalist, the 1937 World Champion, the 1937–1939 European Champion, and a six-time (1935–1939, 1946) British national champion.

Colledge is credited as being the first female skater to perform a double jump, as well as being the inventor of both the camel spin and the layback spin.

== Personal life ==
Cecilia Colledge grew up in London. Her father, Lionel, was a surgeon researching the treatment of throat cancer, and her mother, Margaret, was the daughter of Admiral John Brackenbury. She had one sibling, a brother named Maule who served in the Royal Air Force and died in 1943 during World War II. It is believed the cause of his death was a collision with a Lancaster Bomber piloted by David Maltby, who also died in the crash.

Colledge never married and had no children. She died on 12 April 2008 at Mount Auburn Hospital in Cambridge, Massachusetts.

== Career ==
Colledge began skating after watching the 1928 World Championships, which were held in London. Her mother, Margaret, had been invited by the mother of Maribel Vinson. At the event, Cecilia was inspired by the performances of Sonja Henie and Maribel Vinson, who won gold and silver respectively.

During her career, Colledge was coached by Eva Keats and Jacques Gerschwiler. Gerschwiler was a former gymnastics teacher; according to Colledge, he was "very progressive in his ideas". Colledge also stated that since she was his youngest pupil, he tested his theories on her. He directed her to take ballet lessons, as well as "stretch" lessons from Miss Lee, an acrobatics instructor and former circus performer. Gerschwiler came up with the layback spin while watching Lee train Colledge how to do backbends with a rope tied around Colledge's waist.

At age eleven years and four months, she represented Great Britain at the 1932 Winter Olympics, where she became the youngest Olympic figure skater. She placed 8th in the event.

She won the silver medal at the 1933 European Championships. She won her first British national title in 1935. She won the bronze medal at the 1935 European Championships and the silver medal at the 1935 World Championships.

In 1936, she won her second national title and her second Europeans silver medal. At the 1936 European Championships, Colledge landed a double salchow jump, becoming the first woman to perform a double jump in competition. At age fifteen, she represented Great Britain at the 1936 Winter Olympics, where she won the silver medal behind Henie, finishing a very close second to her, became one of the youngest figure skating Olympic medalists. After the school figures section, Colledge and Henie were virtually neck and neck with Colledge trailing by just a few points. According to Sandra Stevenson in The Independent on 21 April 2008, "the closeness [of the competition] infuriated Henie, who, when the result for that section was posted on a wall in the competitors' lounge, swiped the piece of paper and tore it into little pieces. The draw for the free skating [then] came under suspicion after Henie landed the plum position of skating last, while Colledge had to perform second of the 26 competitors. The early start was seen as a disadvantage, with the audience not yet whipped into a clapping frenzy and the judges known to become freer with their higher marks as the event proceeded. Years later, a fairer, staggered draw was adopted to counteract this situation".

There were two British Championships held in 1937 and Colledge won both of them. She won her first European title at the 1937 European Championships and her first World title at the 1937 World Championships. The following year, Colledge won a fifth national title, a second European title, and won the silver medal at the 1938 World Championships. Writing in 1938, T. D. Richardson (author of Modern Figure Skating and Ice Rink Skating) said "Her Free Skating Programme is by far the most difficult attempted by anyone, man or woman, in the Skating World, but she brings off these staggeringly difficult combinations of jumps and spins with such ease and sureness and at such speed that even experts are sometimes deceived as to the real worth of her programme."

In 1939, she won a third European title, but was unable to compete at the 1939 World Championships because of a strained Achilles tendon.

During World War II, there were no skating competitions. Colledge drove an ambulance in the Motor Transport Corps during the London Blitz. Following the war, she returned to competitive skating and won the British national title for the sixth and final time. After she turned professional, she performed in ice shows and won the 1947 and 1948 Open Professional Championship.

She moved to the United States in 1951 and became a coach in Boston. She coached at the Skating Club of Boston between 1952 and 1977. Among her students were Albertina Noyes, Paul McGrath, and Ron Ludington.

She was inducted into the World Figure Skating Hall of Fame in 1980.

== Innovations ==
At the 1936 European Championships, Colledge became the first female skater to land a double jump in competition when she landed a double salchow.

Colledge, along with her coach Jacques Gerschwiler invented the camel spin (In 1937) and the layback spin. She also invented the one-foot Axel jump, which is also known as the "Colledge".

== Competitive highlights ==
International
Event	1932	1933	1934	1935	1936	1937	1938	1939	1946
Winter Olympics	8th				2nd				
World Championships	8th	5th		2nd		1st	2nd		
European Championships		2nd		3rd	2nd	1st	1st	1st	
National
British Championships	2nd	2nd	2nd	1st	1st	1st	1st	1st	1st
