= Lydia Veicht =

German figure skater (1922–2007)

Lydia Veicht (1922 – 18 September 2007) was a German figure skater. She won five national titles. She placed fifth at the 1938 World Championships and fourth at the 1939 World Championships.

Veicht worked also as an actress, appearing in the movies The Black Forest Girl (1950) and The Colourful Dream (1952).

== Results ==
Event	1937	1938	1939	1940	1941
World Championships		5th	4th		
European Championships		5th			
German Championships	1st	1st	1st	1st	1st
