= Layback spin =

Element in figure skating

Figure skating element
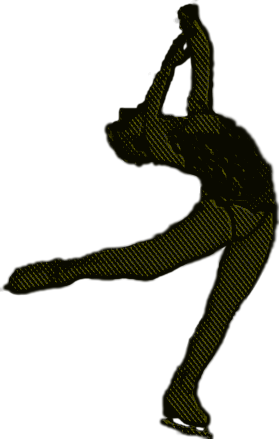
- Element name: Layback spin
- Scoring abbreviation: LSp
- Element type: Upright spin
- Inventor: Cecilia Colledge

A layback spin is a variation of the upright spin, a spin in figure skating. British figure skater Cecilia Colledge was "responsible for the invention" of the spin and the first to execute it. Colledge's coach, Jacques Gerschwiler, who was a former gymnastics teacher and according to Colledge "very progressive in his ideas", got the idea for the upright spin while watching one of Colledge's trainers, a former circus performer turned acrobatics instructor, train Colledge to perform backbends "by means of a rope tied around her waist". The upright spin has long been associated with women's skating, but men have also performed it. Skaters include it in their programs because it increases their technical content and fulfills choreographic needs.

The layback spin is executed by holding the free leg in a back attitude position and arching the head and upper body backward so that the skater faces up towards the sky, ceiling, or further. The free leg position is optional. A variation of the layback spin is the Biellmann spin, made popular by world champion Denise Biellmann, which the International Skating Union (ISU), the organization that governs figure skating, considers a difficult variation of the layback spin. It is executed by the skater grabbing their free blade and pulling the heel of their boot behind and above the level of the head so that their legs are in an approximate full split, with the head and back arched upward. The spin "requires much strength and extreme flexibility".

== Gallery ==
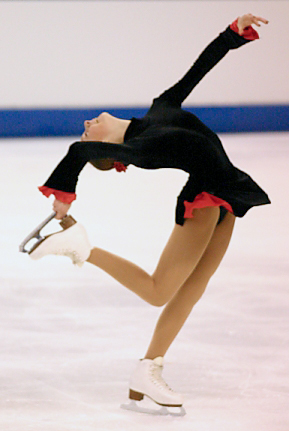
Catch foot layback spin
(Jelena Glebova)

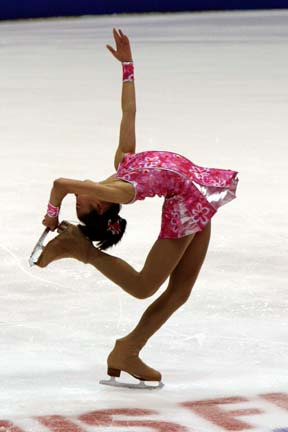
Catch foot layback spin
(Mirai Nagasu)

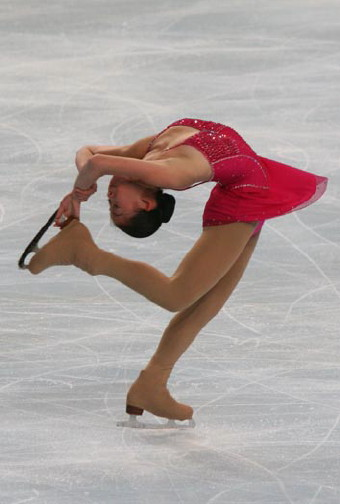
Catch foot layback spin
(Caroline Zhang)

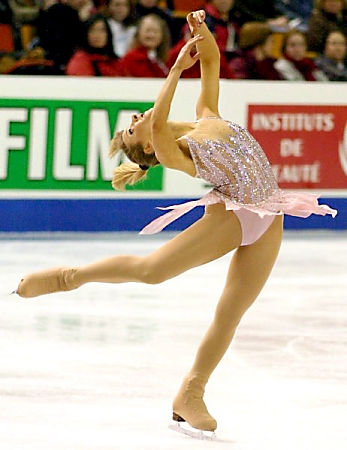
(Angela Nikodinov)

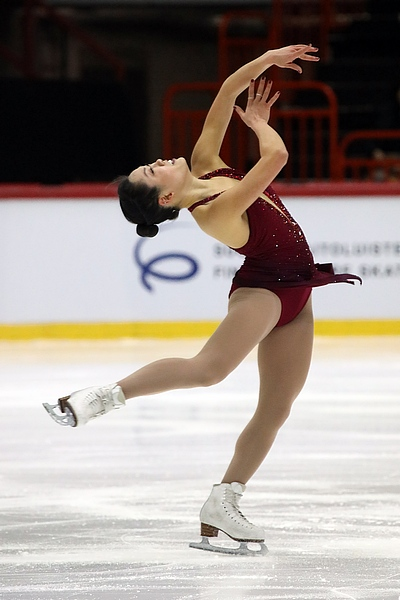
(Angela Wang)

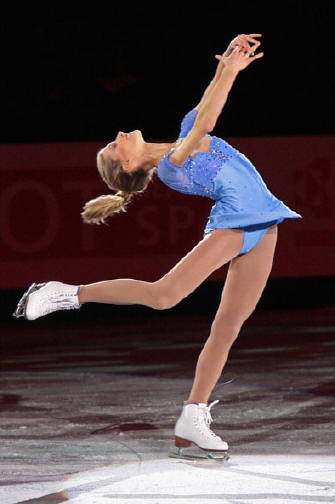
(Becky Bereswill)

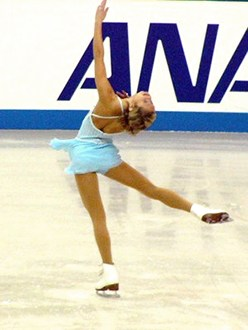
(Jennifer Kirk)

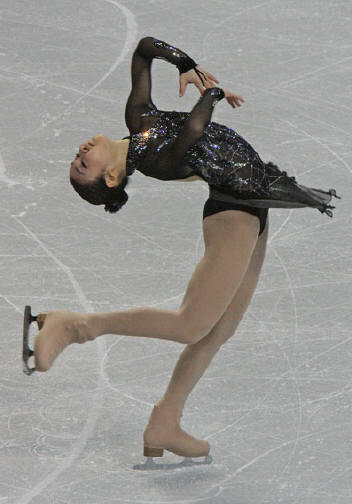
(Yuna Kim)

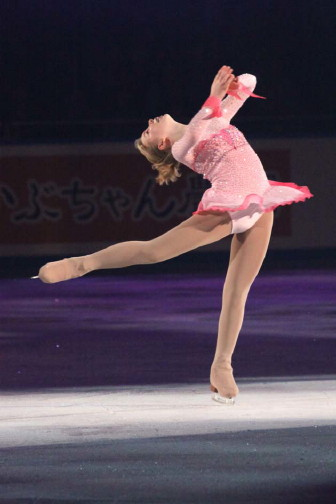
Layback spin
(Rachael Flatt)

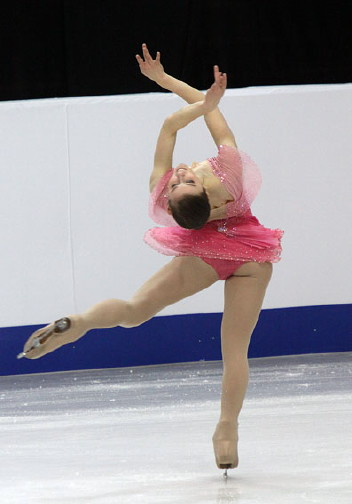
Layback spin
(Ashley Wagner)

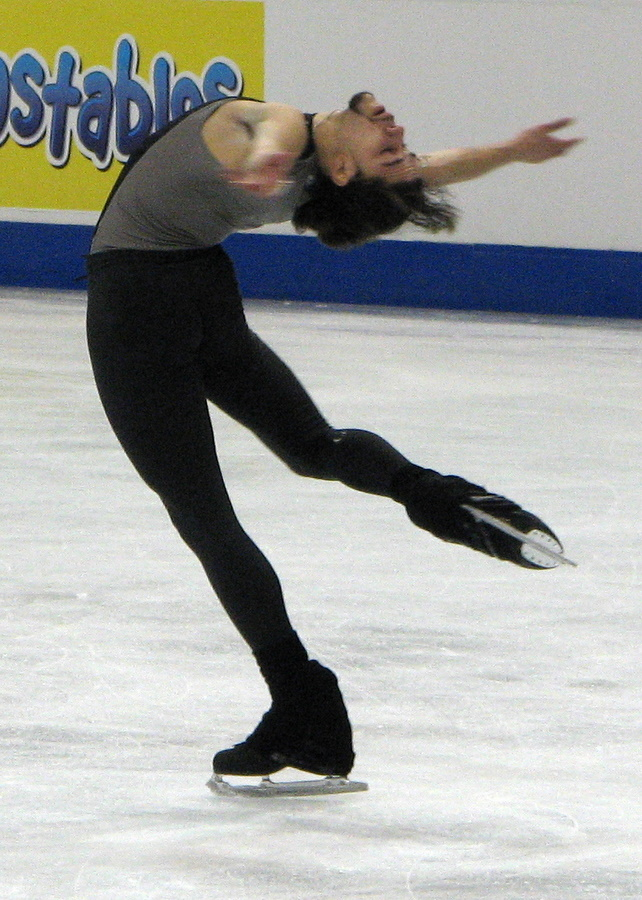
A man performs layback spin
(Rohene Ward)

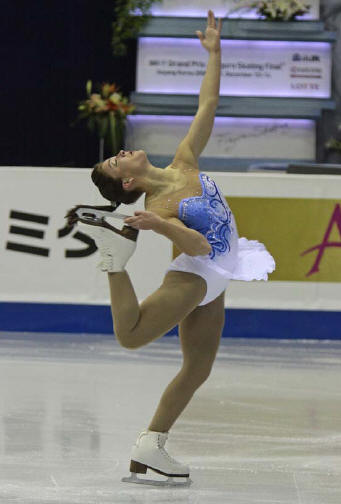
"Haircutter" variation
(Diane Szmiett)

== Works cited ==
- Hines, James R. (2006). Figure Skating: A History. Urbana, Illinois: University of Illinois Press. ISBN 978-0-252-07286-4.
- Kestnbaum, Ellyn (2003). Culture on Ice: Figure Skating and Cultural Meaning. Middletown, Connecticut: Wesleyan University Press. ISBN 0819566411.
