= Günther Noack =

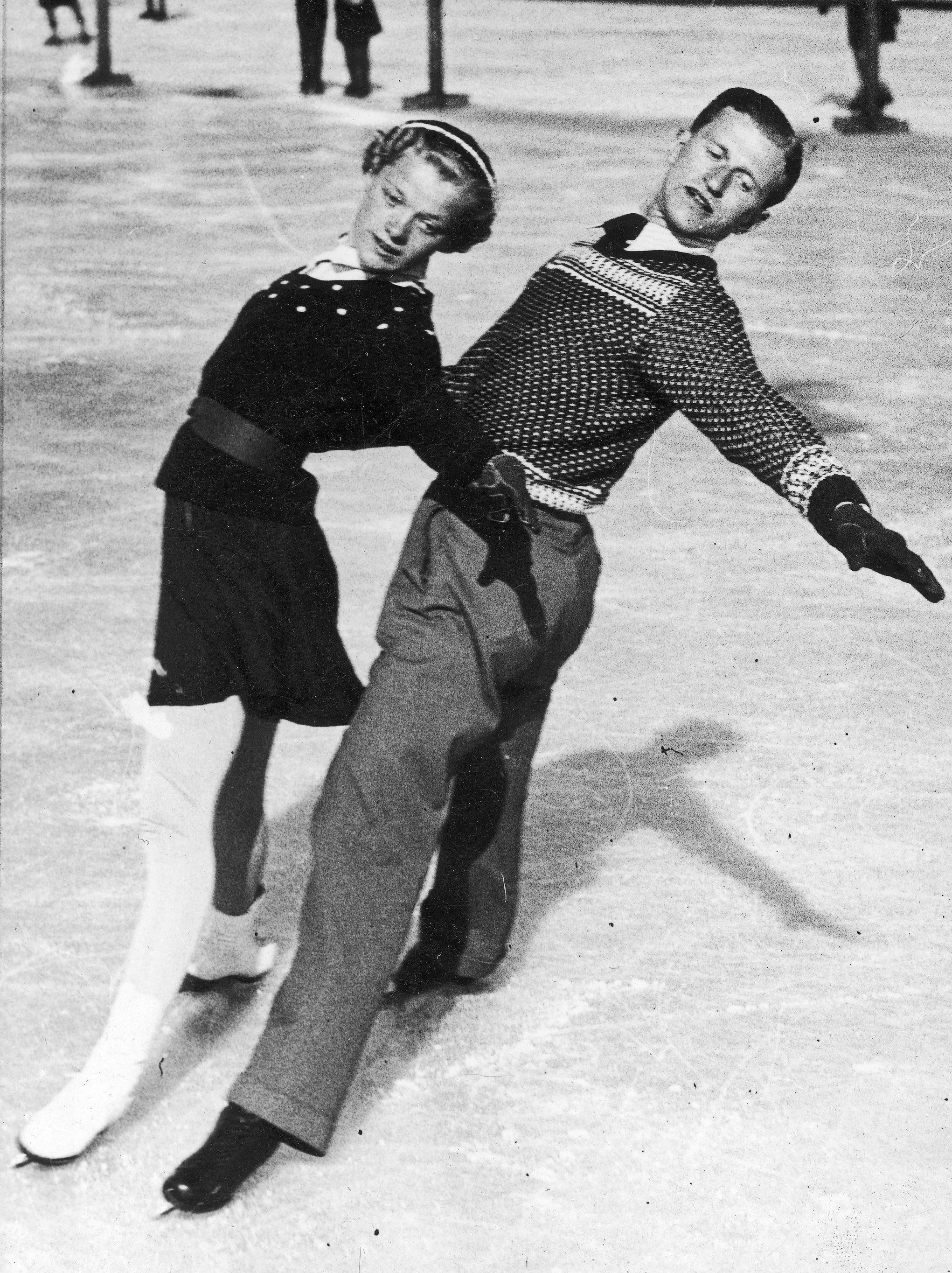
- Noack with Inge Koch at the 1939 World Championships

Figure skating career
- Country: Germany
Medal record
Representing Germany
Pairs figure skating
World Championships
Bronze medal – third place	1938 Berlin	Pairs
Bronze medal – third place	1939 Budapest	Pairs
European Championships
Bronze medal – third place	1938 St. Moritz	Pairs
Bronze medal – third place	1939 Davos	Pairs

Günther Noack (24 December 1912 in Budapest — 3 May 1991 in Biberach an der Riß) was a German figure skater who competed in pair skating.

With partner Inge Koch, he won bronze medals at two World Figure Skating Championships (in 1938 and 1939) and two European Figure Skating Championships (also in 1938 and 1939).

== Competitive highlights ==
With Inge Koch

Event	1937	1938	1939
World Championships	5th	3rd	3rd
European Championships	5th	3rd	3rd
German Championships	2nd	2nd	

With Gerda Strauch

Event	1941	1942	1943
German Championships	3rd	1st	1st
