= Daphne Walker (figure skater) =

British figure skater

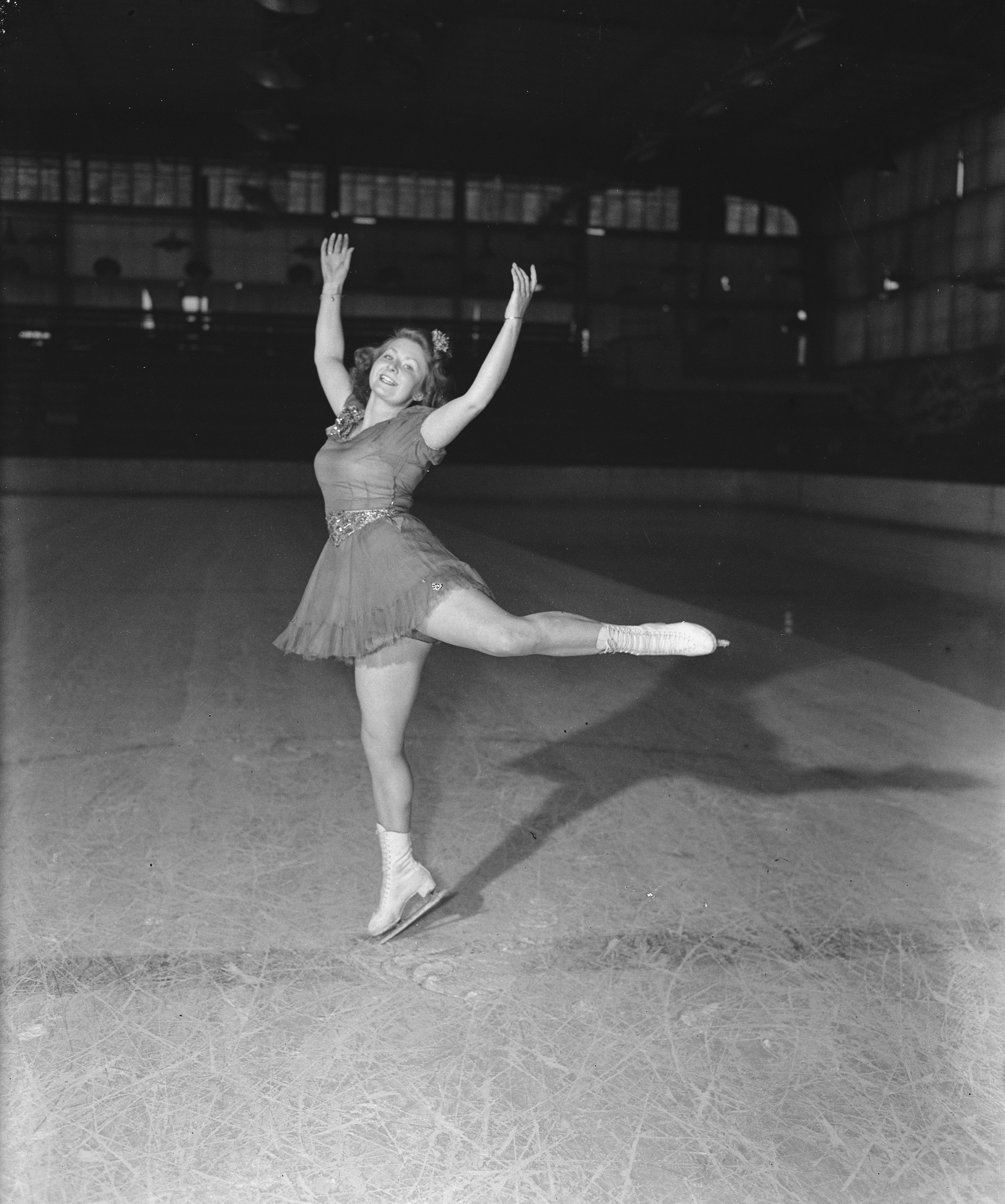
- Daphne Walker in 1946

Personal information
- Full name: Daphne Walker
- Born: c. 1924

Figure skating career
- Country: United Kingdom
- Retired: 1947
Medal record
Representing United Kingdom
Ladies' Figure skating
World Championships
Silver medal – second place	1947 Stockholm	Ladies' singles
Bronze medal – third place	1939 Prague	Ladies' singles
European Championships
Bronze medal – third place	1947 Davos	Ladies' singles
Bronze medal – third place	1939 London	Ladies' singles

Daphne M. Walker (born c. 1924) is a British retired figure skater. She is the 1939 World bronze medalist and 1947 silver medalist, and the 1939 & 1947 European bronze medalist.

Walker almost drowned in Brighton in 1947, but was rescued by American William Keefe. The pair married in London in 1948.

== Results ==
Event	1938	1939	1947
World Championships	7th	3rd	2nd
European Championships	10th	3rd	3rd
British Championships			1st

== Sources ==
- "ISU Official Results: World Figure Skating Championships" (PDF). Archived from the original (PDF) on 3 June 2011.
- "ISU Official Results: European Figure Skating Championships" (PDF). Archived from the original (PDF) on 29 September 2011.
