= Inge Koch (figure skater) =

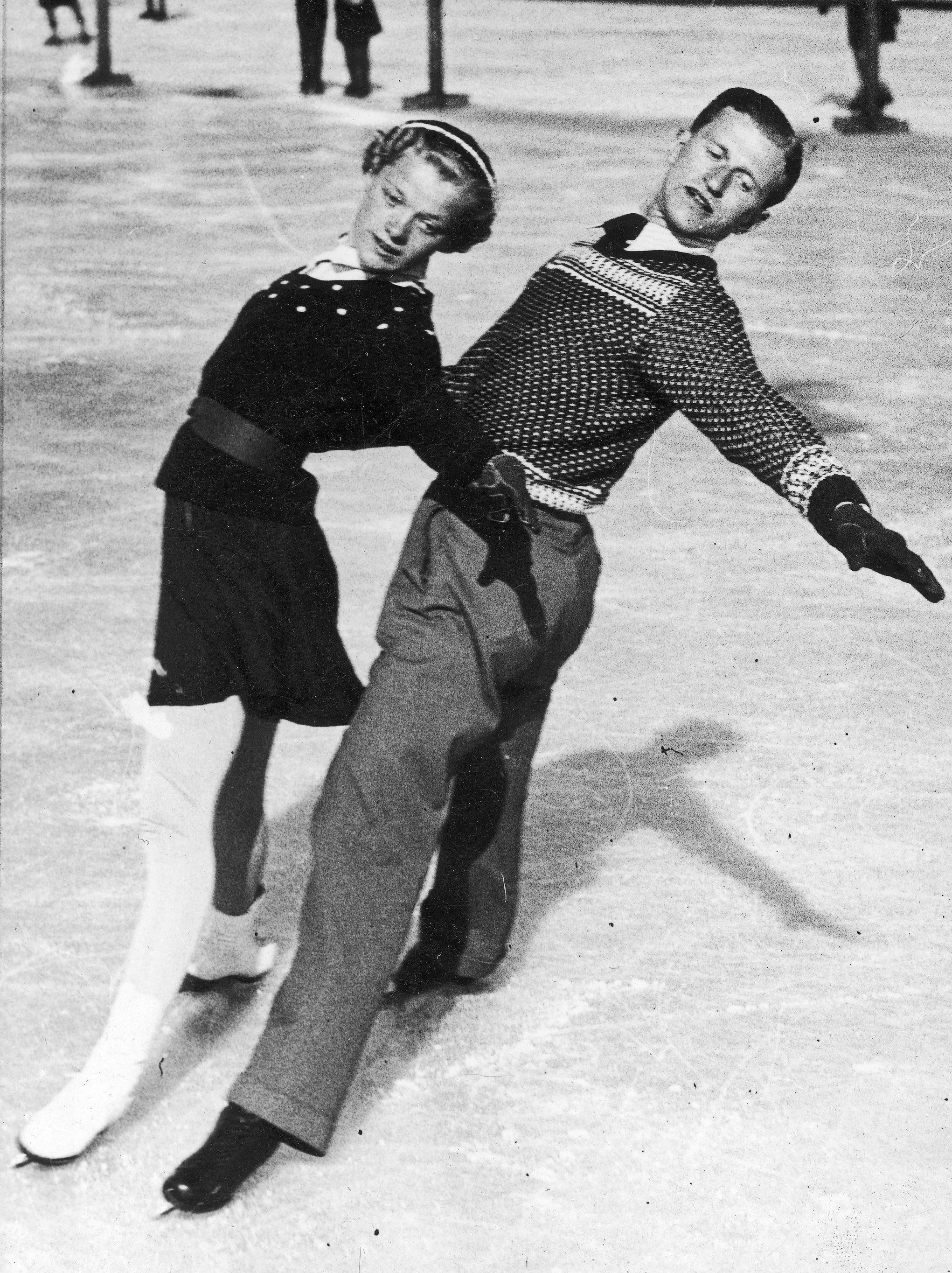
- Koch with Günther Noack at the 1939 World Championships

Figure skating career
- Country: Germany
Medal record
Representing Germany
Pairs figure skating
World Championships
Bronze medal – third place	1938 Berlin	Pairs
Bronze medal – third place	1939 Budapest	Pairs
European Championships
Bronze medal – third place	1938 St. Moritz	Pairs
Bronze medal – third place	1939 Davos	Pairs

Inge Koch was a German figure skater who competed in pair skating.

With partner Günther Noack, she won bronze medals at two World Figure Skating Championships (in 1938 and 1939) and two European Figure Skating Championships (also in 1938 and 1939).

== Competitive highlights ==
With Günther Noack

Event	1937	1938	1939
World Championships	5th	3rd	3rd
European Championships	5th	3rd	3rd
German Championships	2nd	2nd	
