= Elemér Terták =

Hungarian figure skater

Personal information
- Born: 2 November 1918
- Died: 8 July 1999 (aged 80)

Figure skating career
- Country: Hungary
Medal record
Representing Hungary
Men's Figure skating
World Championships
Bronze medal – third place	1937 London	Men's singles
European Championships
Bronze medal – third place	1934 Prague	Men's singles
Bronze medal – third place	1937 Prague	Men's singles

Elemér Terták (born 2 November 1918 in Budapest, Hungary; died 8 July 1999 in Budapest) was a Hungarian figure skater who competed in men's singles. He won the bronze medal at the 1934 European Figure Skating Championships, the 1937 European Championships, and the 1937 World Figure Skating Championships. He also competed in the 1936 Winter Olympic Games, finishing eighth. He was also a figure skating judge and referee.

== Results ==
Event	1933	1934	1935	1936	1937	1938	1939
Winter Olympic Games				8th			
World Championships		7th	6th		3rd	6th	6th
European Championships		3rd	7th	5th	3rd	5th	
Hungarian Championships	3rd	3rd	2nd	2nd	1st	1st	1st
