= Freddy Mésot =

Belgian figure skater

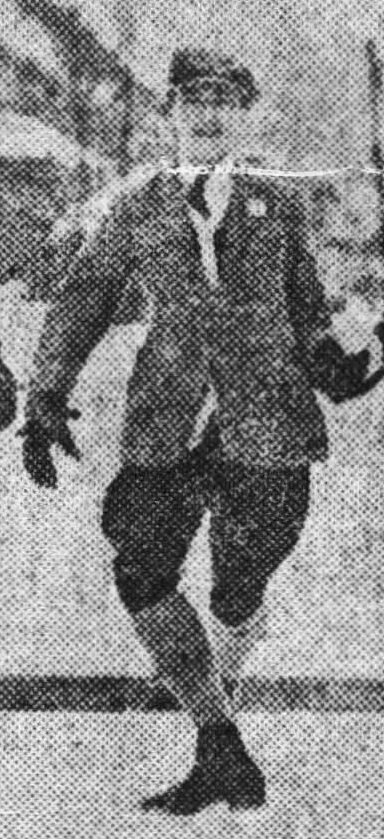

Personal information
- Full name: Frédéric A. Mésot
- Born: 25 May 1905 Sint-Niklaas
- Died: 31 October 1979 (aged 74) Atlanta, Georgia

Figure skating career
- Country: Belgium

Frédéric "Freddy" A. Mésot (25 May 1905 – 31 October 1979) was a Belgian figure skater who competed in the 1924 Winter Olympics. In 1924, he finished ninth in the singles event.

== Results ==
Major results
Event	1923	1924	1936	1937
Winter Olympics		9th		
World Championships			10th	8th
Belgian Championships	1st	1st		1st
