= Herbert Clarke (skater) =

British figure skater

Personal information
- Full name: Herbert James Clarke
- Born: 10 April 1879 London, England
- Died: 5 September 1956 (aged 77)

Figure skating career
- Country: Great Britain

Herbert James Clarke (10 April 1879 – 5 September 1956) was a British figure skater who competed in the 1924 Winter Olympics. He was born in London.

In 1924, Clarke finished tenth in the singles event. He competed and tested in both the English and international styles of skating.

Clarke was a longtime world judge and referee in figure skating, serving almost every year at international competitions during the years leading up to World War II. He was vice-president of the International Skating Union (ISU) twice, from 1927-1935 and 1937-1945. Clarke was also president of the ISU from 1945 to 1953 and was named honorary president in 1955.

According to figure skating historian James R. Hines, Clarke was "instrumental in reviving quickly the international championships following World War II with countries 'not under the control of foreign forces' being allowed to participate, a stipulation established primarily because the prewar federations in those countries no longer existed". Hines also credited the ISU's rapid growth in the years following the war to Clarke's leadership. Clarke was inducted into the World Figure Skating Hall of Fame in 1996.

Sporting positions
| Preceded by Gerrit W. A. van Laer | President of the International Skating Union; 1945–1953 | Succeeded by James Koch |
