= Angela Anderes =

Swiss figure skater (born 1919)

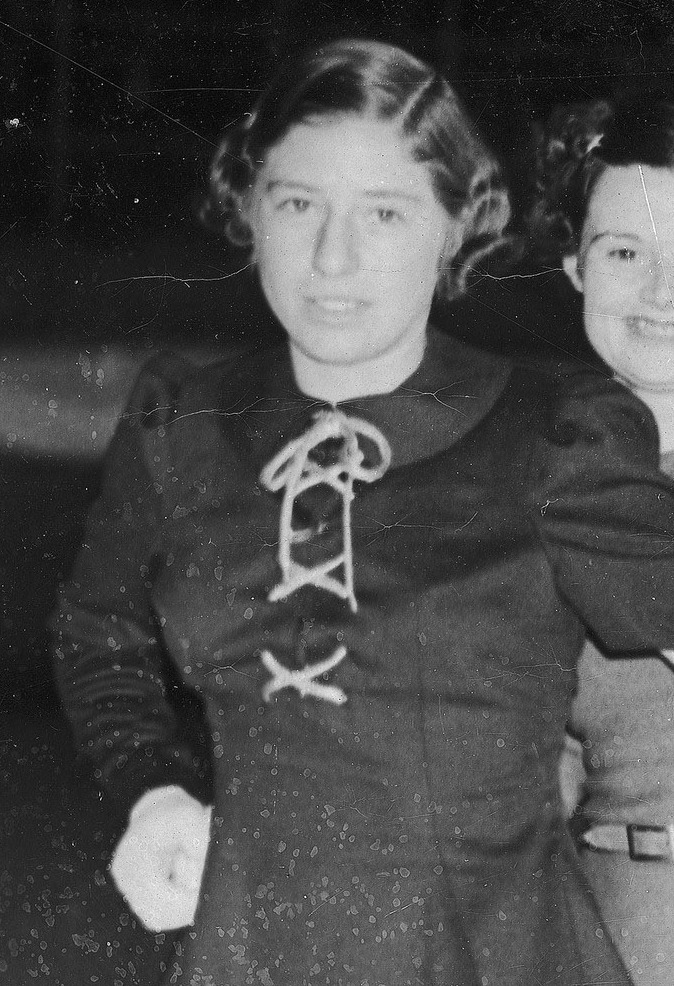
- Angela Anderes (1937)

Personal information
- Nationality: Swiss
- Born: 10 July 1919; Zürich, Switzerland

Sport
- Sport: Figure skating

Angela Rosa Anderes (born 10 July 1919, date of death unknown) was a Swiss figure skater. She competed in the ladies' singles event at the 1936 Winter Olympics. She won five Swiss national titles between 1935 and 1937 and again in 1939 and 1940. Anderes is deceased.
