= Leopold Linhart =

Austrian figure skater

Personal information
- Nationality: Austrian
- Born: 29 July 1914; Vienna, Austria-Hungary
- Died: 5 December 1974 (aged 60)

Sport
- Sport: Figure skating

Leopold Linhart (29 July 1914 – 5 December 1974) was an Austrian figure skater. He competed in the men's singles event at the 1936 Winter Olympics.
