= Emmy Putzinger =

Austrian figure skater

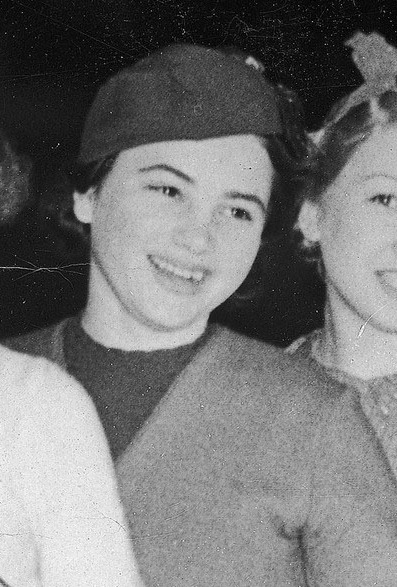

Personal information
- Born: 8 February 1921
- Died: 6 June 2001 (aged 80)

Figure skating career
- Country: Austria
Medal record
Representing Austria
Ladies' Figure skating
European Championships
Bronze medal – third place	1938 St. Moritz	Ladies' singles
Bronze medal – third place	1937 Prague	Ladies' singles

Emmy Putzinger (8 February 1921 – 6 June 2001) was an Austrian figure skater who competed in ladies' singles. She finished seventh at the 1936 Winter Olympic Games and won the bronze medal at the European Figure Skating Championships in 1937 and 1938.

== Results ==
International
Event	1935	1936	1937	1938	1939	1940
Winter Olympics		7th				
World Championships		4th	5th	WD	6th	
European Championships	13th		3rd	3rd	5th	
National
Austrian Championships		1st	1st	1st	1st	2nd
WD = Withdrew
