= Herbert Alward =

Austrian figure skater

Johan Lefstad
Figure skating career
- Country: Austria
Medal record
Representing Austria
Men's figure skating
World Championships
| Bronze medal – third place | 1938 Berlin | Men |

Herbert Alward was an Austrian figure skater who competed in men's singles.

He won the bronze medal in men's single skating at the 1938 World Figure Skating Championships.

== Competitive highlights ==
International
| Event | 1936 | 1937 | 1938 | 1939 |
|---|---|---|---|---|
| World Championships | 9th | 4th | 3rd | 5th |
| European Championships | | 5th | 3rd | |
National
| Austrian Championships | | | | 2nd |

Note: "Gau-Championships" ("Ostmark" Championships) were held instead of Austrian Championships from 1938 to 1943.
