= 1935 European Figure Skating Championships =

Competition in St. Moritz, Switzerland

- Type: ISU Championship
- Date: January 23 – 26
- Season: 1935
- Location: St. Moritz, Switzerland

Champions
- Men's singles: (Austria) Karl Schäfer
- Ladies' singles: (Norway) Sonja Henie
- Pairs: (Germany) Maxi Herber / Ernst Baier
- Previous: 1934 European Figure Skating Championships
- Next: 1936 European Figure Skating Championships

The 1935 European Figure Skating Championships were held in St. Moritz, Switzerland from January 23 to 26. Elite senior-level figure skaters competed for the title of European Champion in the disciplines of men's singles, ladies' singles, and pair skating.

== Results ==
=== Men ===
Rank	Name	Places
1	(Austria) Karl Schäfer	8
2	(Austria) Felix Kaspar	18
3	(Germany) Ernst Baier	22
4	(United Kingdom) Jack Dunn	26
5	(Finland) Marcus Nikkanen	41
6	(Austria) Erich Erdös	44
7	(Kingdom of Hungary) Elemér Terták	44
8	(Austria) Leopold Linhart	49
9	(Austria) Emil Ratzenhofer	71
10	(Switzerland) Lucian Büeler	72
11	(France) Jean Henrion	75
12	(Germany) Herbert Haertel	76

Judges were

- (United Kingdom) Kenneth Dundas
- (Austria) Josef Fellner
- (Switzerland) A. Huber
- (Belgium) Freddy Mésot
- (France) Charles Sabouret
- (Kingdom of Hungary) László Orbán
- (Germany) Artur Vieregg

=== Ladies ===
Rank	Name	Places
1	(Norway) Sonja Henie	7
2	(Austria) Liselotte Landbeck	17
3	(United Kingdom) Cecilia Colledge	21
4	(Germany) Maxi Herber	35
5	(United Kingdom) Gweneth Butler	37
6	(Austria) Grete Lainer	39
7	(Austria) Hedy Stenuf	47
8	(United Kingdom) Mollie Phillips	74
9	(Belgium) Yvonne de Ligne-Geurts	76
10	(Norway) Nanna Egedius	76
11	(Switzerland) Herta Frey-Dexler	77
12	(Germany) Victoria Lindpaintner	82
13	(Austria) Emmy Putzinger	79
14	(Kingdom of Hungary) Nadine Szilassy	81
15	(United Kingdom) Diana Fane-Gladwin	98
16	(France) Gaby Clericetti	106

Judges were

- (Germany) Kurt Dannenberg
- (Austria) Hans Günauer
- (Norway) Z. Johansen
- (United Kingdom) H. Martineau
- (Belgium) Freddy Mésot
- (Kingdom of Hungary) László Orbán
- (France) Charles Sabouret

=== Pairs ===
Rank	Name	Places
1	(Germany) Maxi Herber / Ernst Baier	11
2	(Austria) Idi Papez / Karl Zwack	15
3	(Kingdom of Hungary) Lucy Galló / Rezső Dillinger	31.5
4	(Austria) Ilse Pausin / Erik Pausin	24
5	(Kingdom of Hungary) Éva Tusák / Zoltán Balázs	38
6	(Austria) Eleanore Bäumel / Fritz Wächtler	42
7	(United Kingdom) Violet Supple / Leslie Cliff	46
8	(Czechoslovakia) Traute Jäger / Fritz Lesk	53.5
9	(France) Gaby Clericetti / Jean Henrion	54

Judges were

- (Austria) Wilhelm Bayerle
- (United Kingdom) Kenneth Beaumont
- (Switzerland) L. Liebermann
- (Belgium) Freddy Mésot
- (Kingdom of Hungary) László Orbán
- (France) Charles Sabouret
- (Germany) Artur Vieregg
