= 1934 European Figure Skating Championships =

Figure skating competition

1934 European Championships
- Type: ISU Championship
- Season: 1933–34
- Location: Seefeld, Austria and (Czechoslovakia) Prague

Champions
- Men's singles: (Austria) Karl Schäfer
- Ladies' singles: (Norway) Sonja Henie
- Pairs: (Kingdom of Hungary) Emília Rotter / László Szollás
- Previous: 1933 European Championships
- Next: 1935 European Championships

The 1934 European Figure Skating Championships were held in Seefeld, Austria (men) and in Prague (women and pairs). Elite senior-level figure skaters from European ISU member nations, as well as the United States, competed for the title of European Champion in the disciplines of men's singles, ladies' singles, and pair skating.

== Results ==
=== Men ===
Rank	Name	Places
1	(Austria) Karl Schäfer	
2	(Kingdom of Hungary) Dénes Pataky	14
3	(Kingdom of Hungary) Elemér Terták	22
4	(Austria) Leopold Linhart	
5	(Austria) Erich Erdös	
6	(United Kingdom) Jack Dunn	
7	(Austria) Felix Kaspar	
8	(Kingdom of Hungary) Ferenc Kertesz	
9	(Czechoslovakia) Vladimir Koudelka	
10	(Switzerland) Erwin Keller	
11	(France) Jean Henrion	
12	(Austria) Josef Bernhauser	
13	(Austria) Rudolf Zettelmann	

=== Ladies ===
Rank	Name	Places
1	(Norway) Sonja Henie	
2	(Austria) Liselotte Landbeck	
3	(United States) Maribel Vinson	
4	(United Kingdom) Megan Taylor	
5	(Austria) Grete Lainer	
6	(Norway) Nanna Egedius	
7	(Belgium) Yvonne de Ligne-Geurts	
8	(Denmark) Esther Bornstein	
9	(United Kingdom) Mollie Phillips	
10	(Czechoslovakia) Fritzi Metznerová	

=== Pairs ===
Rank	Name	Places
1	(Kingdom of Hungary) Emília Rotter / László Szollás	7
2	(Austria) Idi Papez / Karl Zwack	
3	(Poland) Zofia Bilorówna / Tadeusz Kowalski	
4	(Kingdom of Hungary) Lucy Galló / Rezső Dillinger	22
5	(Austria) Herta Baumgartner / Rolf Stillebacher	
6	(Czechoslovakia) Traute Jäger / Fritz Lesk	
7	(Romania) Irina Timcic / Alfred Eisenbeisser	
8	(Czechoslovakia) Netty Eisenbeiss / Karl Friedel	
9	(Latvia) Hildegarde Schwarz / Eduards Goschel	
10	(Czechoslovakia) Libuše Veselá / Vojtěch Veselý	
