= 1934 World Figure Skating Championships =

Annual figure skating competition held in 1934

- Type: ISU Championship
- Date: February 16 – 18 (men); February 10 – 11 (ladies); February 23 (pairs)
- Season: 1934
- Location: Stockholm, Sweden (men); Oslo, Norway (ladies); Helsinki, Finland (pairs)

Champions
- Men's singles: (Austria) Karl Schäfer
- Ladies' singles: (Norway) Sonja Henie
- Pairs: (Kingdom of Hungary) Emília Rotter / László Szollás
- Previous: 1933 World Championships
- Next: 1935 World Championships

The World Figure Skating Championships is an annual figure skating competition sanctioned by the International Skating Union in which figure skaters compete for the title of World Champion.

Men's competitions took place from February 16 to 18 in Stockholm, Sweden. Ladies' competitions took place February from 10 to 11 in Oslo, Norway. Pairs' competition took place on February 23 in Helsinki, Finland.

== Medal table ==
* Host nations (Sweden, Norway)

Rank	Nation	Gold	Silver	Bronze	Total
1	Austria	1	1	2	4
2	Hungary	1	0	0	1
2	Norway*	1	0	0	1
4	Germany	0	1	1	2
5	Great Britain	0	1	0	1
Totals (5 entries)		3	3	3	9

== Results ==
=== Men ===
Rank	Name	Age	Total	Points	Places
1	(Austria) Karl Schäfer	24	2693.7	384.81	7
2	(Germany) Ernst Baier	29	2540.1	362.87	26
3	(Austria) Erich Erdös	19	2525.2	360.74	26
4	(Finland) Marcus Nikkanen	30	2500.7	357.24	26
5	(Kingdom of Hungary) Dénes Pataky	17	2458.7	351.24	28
6	(United Kingdom) Graham Sharp	16	2431.1	347.30	41
7	(Kingdom of Hungary) Elemér Terták	15	2432.9	347.55	42
8	(United States) Gail Borden	27	2310.7	330.10	56

- Referee: (Sweden) Ulrich Salchow

Judges:

- (United Kingdom) Herbert J. Clarke
- (Austria) Hans Günauer
- (Finland) Walter Jakobsson
- (Kingdom of Hungary) A. Jármy
- (Norway) Zaden Johansen
- (Poland) Władysław Kuchar
- (Germany) Artur Vieregg

=== Ladies ===
Rank	Name	Places
1	(Norway) Sonja Henie	7
2	(United Kingdom) Megan Taylor	19
3	(Austria) Liselotte Landbeck	20
4	(Sweden) Vivi-Anne Hultén	28
5	(United States) Maribel Vinson	32
6	(Austria) Grete Lainer	48
7	(Germany) Maxi Herber	55
8	(Norway) Nanna Egedius	55
9	(United Kingdom) Mollie Phillips	59
10	(Norway) Erna Andersen	73
11	(Germany) Edith Michaelis	70
12	(Denmark) Ester Bornstein	82
13	(Norway) Randi Gulliksen	89

Judges:

- (Austria) Hans Günauer
- (Kingdom of Hungary) A. Jármy
- (Norway) R. Lund
- (France) Charles Sabouret
- (Sweden) Per Thorén
- (Germany) Artur Vieregg
- (United Kingdom) C. L. Wilson

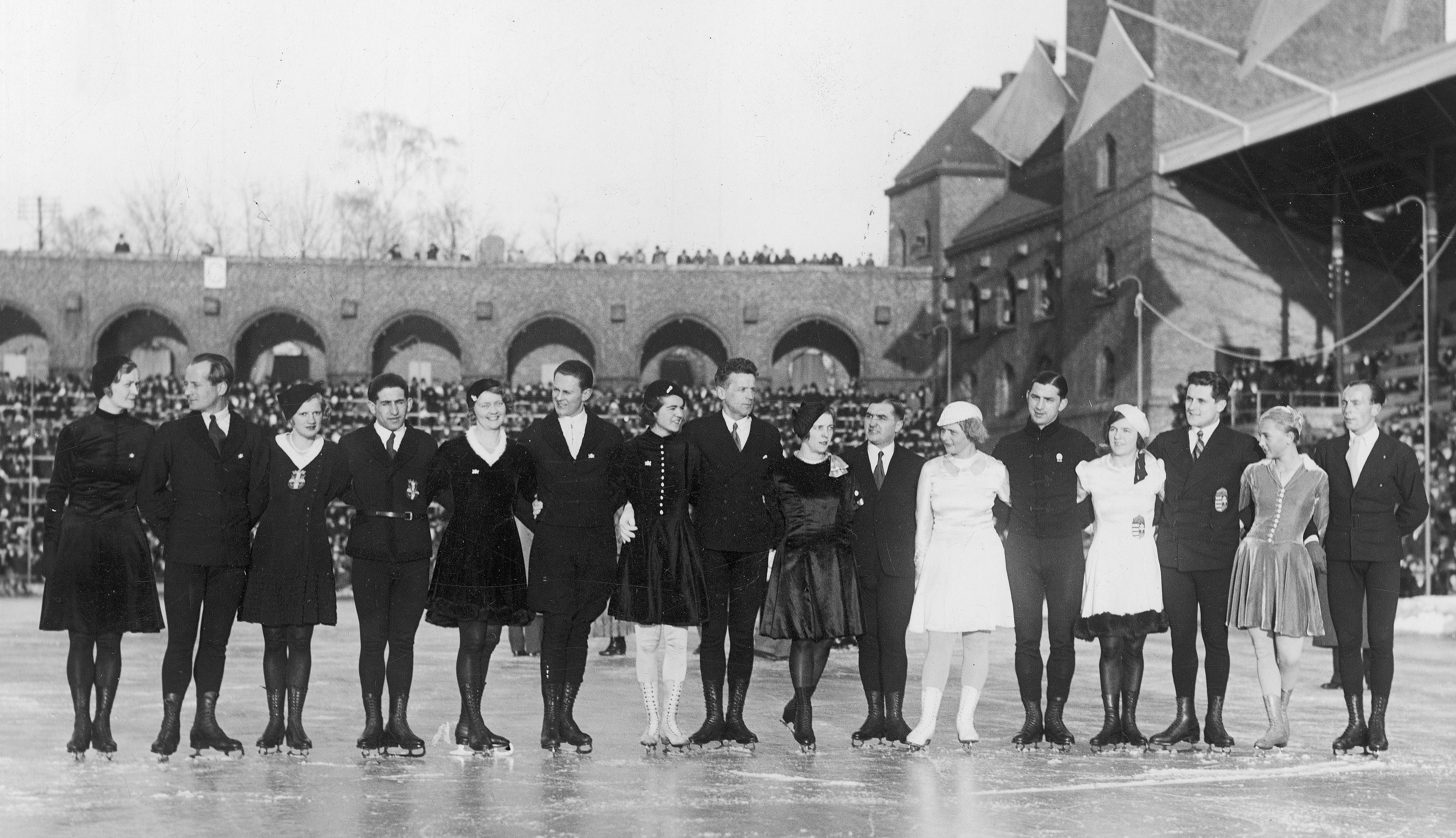
Pairs at the 1934 World Championships

=== Pairs ===
Rank	Name	Places
1	(Kingdom of Hungary) Emília Rotter / László Szollás	12
2	(Austria) Idi Papez / Karl Zwack	14
3	(Germany) Maxi Herber / Ernst Baier	18
4	(Poland) Zofia Bilorówna / Tadeusz Kowalski	30
5	(Norway) Randi Bakke / Christen Christensen	32.5
6	(Sweden) Margit Josephson / Anders Palm	40.5

Judges:

- (Finland) H. Bardy
- (Austria) Hans Günauer
- (Kingdom of Hungary) A. Jármy
- (Poland) Władysław Kuchar
- (Sweden) Tore Monthander
- (Norway) Th. Schjöll
- (Germany) Artur Vieregg
