= Figure skating at the 1936 Winter Olympics – Ladies' singles =

Figure skating at the Olympics

Ladies' singles at the IV Olympic Winter Games
- Venue: Olympia-Kunsteisstadion
- Dates: 11-15 February 1936
- Competitors: 26 from 13 nations

Medalists
1st place, gold medalist(s)		Sonja Henie	Norway
2nd place, silver medalist(s)		Cecilia Colledge	Great Britain
3rd place, bronze medalist(s)		Vivi-Anne Hultén	Sweden

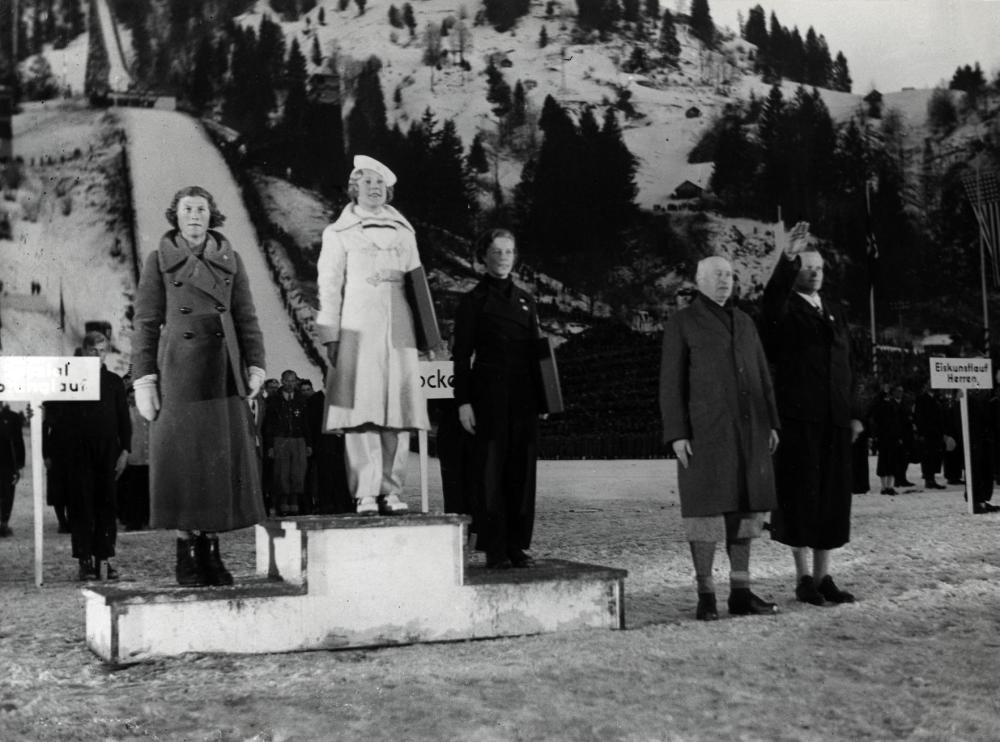
Single skating

The ladies' individual skating event was held as part of the figure skating at the 1936 Winter Olympics. It was the sixth appearance of the event, which had previously been held twice at the Summer Olympics in 1908 and 1920 and at all three Winter Games from 1924 onward. The competition was held from Tuesday, 11 February to Saturday, 15 February 1936. Twenty-six figure skaters from 13 nations competed.

== Results ==
Sonja Henie successfully defended her 1928 and 1932 title again; making her the most successful female Olympic figure skater ever.

Rank	Name	Nation	CF	FS	Total points	Places
1	Sonja Henie	Norway	1	1	424.5	7.5
2	Cecilia Colledge	Great Britain	2	2	418.1	13.5
3	Vivi-Anne Hultén	Sweden	4	4	394.7	28
4	Liselotte Landbeck	Belgium	3	6	393.3	32
5	Maribel Vinson	United States	6	7	388.7	39
6	Hedy Stenuf	Austria	8	3	387.6	40
7	Emmy Putzinger	Austria	9	4	381.8	49
8	Victoria Lindpaintner	Germany	7	10	381.4	51
9	Grete Lainer	Austria	10	11	373.4	65
10	Etsuko Inada	Japan	13	9	368.1	77
11	Mollie Phillips	Great Britain	12	12	366.2	78
12	Audrey Peppe	United States	18	8	363.3	85
13	Angela Anderes	Switzerland	15	16	355.4	101
14	Bianca Schenk	Austria	16	14	356.4	102
15	Éva Botond	Hungary	11	17	356.1	106
16	Belita Jepson-Turner	Great Britain	14	18	352.6	107
17	Věra Hrubá	Czechoslovakia	20	13	353.3	111
18	Yvonne de Ligne	Belgium	19	15	348.2	118
19	Herta Frey-Dexler	Switzerland	17	19	345.4	129
20	Fritzi Metznerová	Czechoslovakia	21	21	339.2	141
21	Louise Weigel	United States	22	20	336.4	140
22	Estelle Weigel	United States	23	22	324.5	151
23	Alise Dzeguze	Latvia	24	23	280.9	161
WD	Gweneth Butler	Great Britain	5			
WD	Constance Wilson-Samuel	Canada				
WD	Nanna Egedius	Norway				

Referee:

- (Finland) Walter Jakobsson

Judges:

- (United States) Charles M. Rotch
- (United Kingdom) C.L. Wilson
- (Germany) Fritz Schober
- (Belgium) Henri Hoyoux
- (Sweden) August Anderberg
- (Austria) Wilhelm Bayerle
- (Czechoslovakia) Ladislav Fürst
