= 1935 World Figure Skating Championships =

Annual figure skating competition held in 1935

- Type: ISU Championship
- Date: February 16 – 17 (men and pairs); February 8 – 9 (ladies)
- Season: 1935
- Location: (Kingdom of Hungary) Budapest, Hungary (men and pairs); Vienna, Austria (ladies)

Champions
- Men's singles: (Austria) Karl Schäfer
- Ladies' singles: (Norway) Sonja Henie
- Pairs: (Kingdom of Hungary) Emília Rotter / László Szollás
- Previous: 1934 World Championships
- Next: 1936 World Championships

The World Figure Skating Championships is an annual figure skating competition sanctioned by the International Skating Union in which figure skaters compete for the title of World Champion.

Men's and pairs' competitions took place from February 16 to 17 in Budapest, Hungary. Ladies' competitions took place from February 8 to 9 in Vienna, Austria.

== Medal table ==
* Host nations (Hungary, Austria)

Rank	Nation	Gold	Silver	Bronze	Total
1	Austria*	1	1	0	2
2	Hungary*	1	0	2	3
3	Norway	1	0	0	1
4	Great Britain	0	2	0	2
5	Sweden	0	0	1	1
Totals (5 entries)		3	3	3	9

== Results ==
=== Men ===
Rank	Name	Places
1	(Austria) Karl Schäfer	8
2	(United Kingdom) Jack Dunn	15
3	(Kingdom of Hungary) Dénes Pataky	15
4	(United Kingdom) Graham Sharp	21
5	(Finland) Marcus Nikkanen	25
6	(Kingdom of Hungary) Elemér Terták	25
7	(Austria) Erich Erdös	36
8	(Kingdom of Hungary) Ferenc Kertész	38

Judges:

- (United Kingdom) Herbert Clarke
- (Austria) Hans Günauer
- (France) Charles Sabouret
- (Germany) Fritz Schober
- (Kingdom of Hungary) Andor Szende

=== Ladies ===
Rank	Name	Places
1	(Norway) Sonja Henie	7
2	(United Kingdom) Cecilia Colledge	17
3	(Sweden) Vivi-Anne Hultén	22
4	(Austria) Hedy Stenuf	30
5	(United Kingdom) Gweneth Butler	38
6	(Switzerland) Herta Frey-Dexler	42
7	(Norway) Nanna Egedius	40.5
8	(Austria) Helga Schrittwieser-Dietz	55.5

Judges:

- (Sweden) August Anderberg
- (Austria) Wilhelm Bayerle
- (United Kingdom) Herbert Clarke
- (Switzerland) A. Huber
- (Norway) R. Lund
- (France) Charles Sabouret
- (Czechoslovakia) Jiří Sýkora

=== Pairs ===
Rank	Name	Places
1	(Kingdom of Hungary) Emília Rotter / László Szollás	5
2	(Austria) Ilse Pausin / Erich Pausin	12.5
3	(Kingdom of Hungary) Lucy Galló / Rezső Dillinger	14.5
4	(Kingdom of Hungary) Piroska Szekrényessy / Attila Szekrényessy	25.5
5	(Poland) Zofia Bilorówna / Tadeusz Kowalski	26
6	(Germany) Wally Hampel / Otto Weiß	27
7	(Austria) Liese Kianek / Adolf Rosdol	31
8	(Poland) Barbara Chachlewska / Alfred Theuer	38.5

Judges:

- (United Kingdom) Herbert Clarke
- (Austria) Rudolf Kaler
- (Poland) Władysław Kuchar
- (Kingdom of Hungary) László Orbán
- (Germany) Fritz Schober
