= Skippy Baxter =

Canadian-born American figure skater

Personal information
- Full name: Lloyd Valdemar Baxter
- Born: December 6, 1919 Saskatchewan, Canada
- Died: December 18, 2012 (aged 93) United States

Figure skating career
- Country: United States
- Discipline: Men's singles, Pairs
- Partner: Hedy Stenuf

Lloyd Valdemar "Skippy" Baxter (December 6, 1919 – December 18, 2012) was an American figure skater. He was third in men's singles and second in pairs (with Hedy Stenuf) at the U.S. Figure Skating Championships (1940). For most of his career he performed professionally in ice shows.

== Skating career ==
As a child, Baxter won awards in speed skating. As a figure skater, he competed nationally in both singles and pairs, winning bronze in men's singles and a silver in pair skating with Hedy Stenuf at the 1940 U.S. Figure Skating Championships. Baxter was named to the United States Olympic Figure Skating team in 1940, but the Winter Olympics were cancelled due to World War II.

Baxter was one of the first skaters to land a triple salchow jump, in 1939 and the 1940s, although the first to be officially completed in international competition would not be until 1955 by Ronald Robertson. He was also one of the first skaters to perform a double lutz, reportedly a regular part of his exhibition programs as early as 1941. He and his pairs partner Hedy also demonstrated some of the first axel jumps performed on roller skates in 1940.

Baxter went on to skate professionally with companies including the Ice Capades. He starred in ice shows at the Rockefeller Center Theater in New York from 1946 to 1950, and then Sonja Henie and the Hollywood Ice Revue until 1956. Baxter was famous for the backflip that he regularly performed during shows. He was inducted into the United States Figure Skating Hall of Fame in 2003, and is a member of the PSA hall of fame.

== Coaching career ==
After the Hollywood Ice Revue closed, Skippy and his brother Meryl Baxter owned an ice rink in Santa Rosa, California on Summerfield Road. Some of their early students included Tickner and Peggy Fleming. Charles Schulz often took his family to their rink for skating lessons. Schulz and Baxter formed a close friendship that lasted until the death of Schulz' death. The Santa Rosa Ice Skating Rink closed in 1968 due to structural problems with the roof. After the closing, Schulz asked Baxter and his brother if they would run a new rink if he built it, to which they agreed.

He then taught figure skating in Northern California at the Redwood Empire Ice Arena in Santa Rosa, California, more commonly known as Snoopy's Home Ice - the rink Schulz built. Baxter was in charge of instruction, and his brother was the manager.

== Personal life ==
Born in Saskatchewan, Canada, his family moved to Oakland, California when he was 1 year old. He endured an accident as a youth with a tractor, which almost resulted in a leg amputation. After this, he began skating at the urging of his mother to strengthen his leg to avoid amputation.

Baxter enlisted in the United States army in 1943 and served in Northern Italy during the war with the 10th Mountain Division, along with his brother Meryl Baxter.

== Results ==
(men's singles)

Event	1940
U.S. Championships	3rd

(pairs with Stenuf)

Event	1940
U.S. Championships	2nd
