= Pausin =

Pausin is a surname. Notable people with the surname include:

- Erik Pausin (1920–1997), Austrian pair skater
- Ilse Pausin (1919–1999), Austrian pair skater
