= 1933 European Figure Skating Championships =

Figure skating competition

1933 European Championships
- Type: ISU Championship
- Season: 1933–34
- Location: London, United Kingdom

Champions
- Men's singles: (Austria) Karl Schäfer
- Ladies' singles: (Norway) Sonja Henie
- Pairs: (Austria) Idi Papez / Karl Zwack
- Previous: 1932 European Championships
- Next: 1934 European Championships

The 1933 European Figure Skating Championships were held in London, United Kingdom. Elite senior-level figure skaters from European ISU member nations competed for the title of European Champion in the disciplines of men's singles, ladies' singles, and pair skating.

== Results ==
=== Men ===
| Rank | Name | Places |
|---|---|---|
| 1 | (Austria) Karl Schäfer | |
| 2 | (Germany) Ernst Baier | |
| 3 | (Austria) Erich Erdös | |
| 4 | (France) Jean Henrion | |
| 5 | (United Kingdom) William Clunie | |

=== Ladies ===
| Rank | Name | Places |
|---|---|---|
| 1 | (Norway) Sonja Henie | |
| 2 | (United Kingdom) Cecilia Colledge | |
| 3 | (Austria) Fritzi Burger | |
| 4 | (Austria) Hilde Holovsky | |
| 5 | (Belgium) Yvonne de Ligne-Geurts | |
| 6 | (Austria) Liselotte Landbeck | |
| 7 | (United Kingdom) Mollie Phillips | |
| 8 | (Austria) Grete Lainer | |
| 9 | (United Kingdom) Gweneth Butler | |
| 10 | (Denmark) Esther Bornstein | |
| 11 | (France) Margeret Thorpe | |

=== Pairs ===
| Rank | Name | Places |
|---|---|---|
| 1 | (Austria) Idi Papez / Karl Zwack | |
| 2 | (Austria) Lilly Gaillard / Willy Petter | |
| 3 | (United Kingdom) Mollie Phillips / Rodney Murdoch | |
| 4 | (United Kingdom) Violet Supple / Leslie Cliff | |
| 5 | (United Kingdom) Gertrude Burman / Proctor Burman | |
