= Willy Petter =

Austrian figure skater

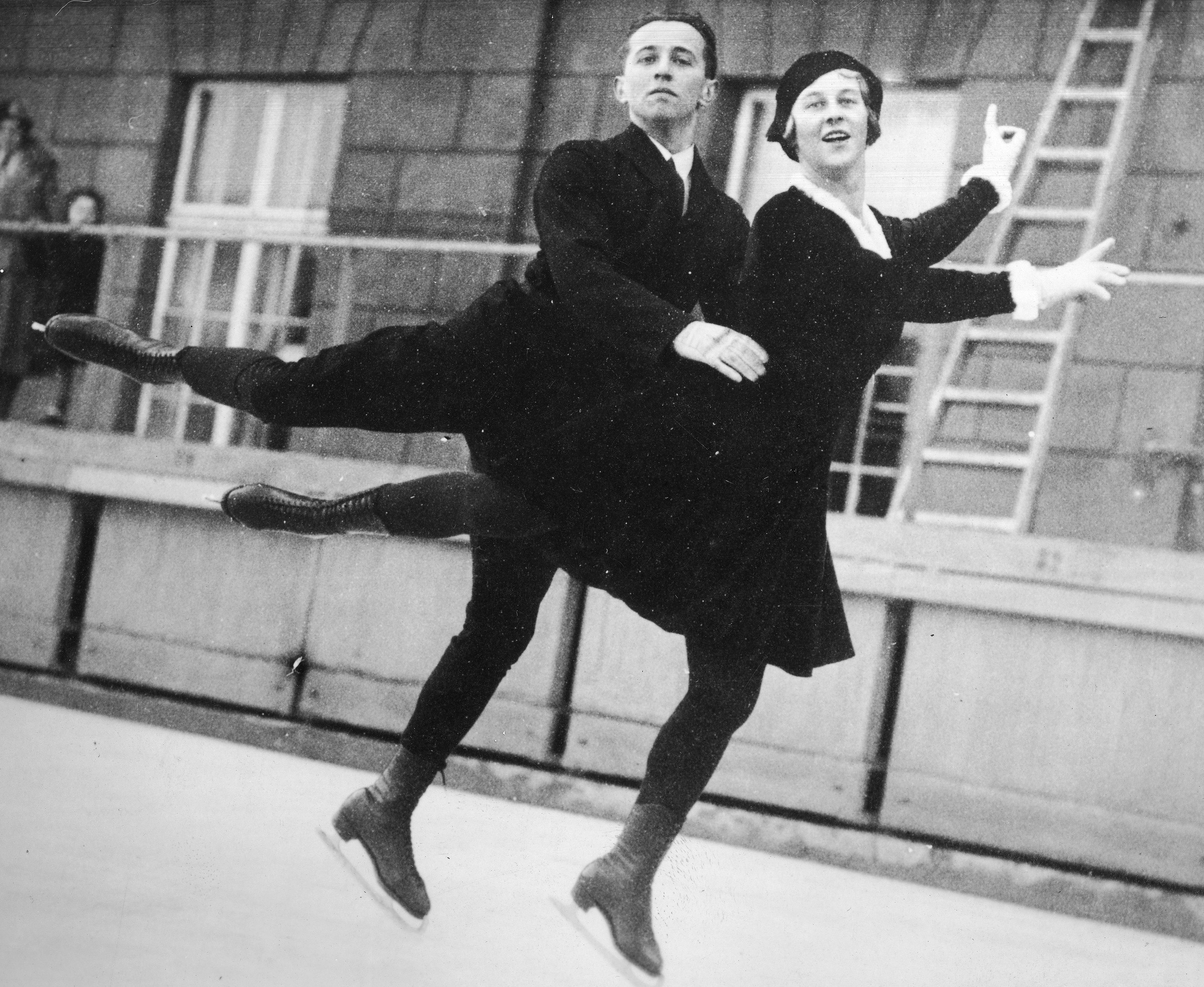
- Petter with partner Gaillard in 1932

Figure skating career
- Country: Austria
- Partner: Lilly Gaillard
- Retired: 1933
Medal record
Representing Austria
Figure skating: Pairs
European Championships
Silver medal – second place	1932 Paris	Pairs
Silver medal – second place	1933 London	Pairs
Bronze medal – third place	1931 St. Moritz	Pairs

Willy Petter was an Austrian figure skater who competed in pair skating. With partner Lilly Gaillard, he became a three-time European medalist, winning bronze in 1931 and silver in 1932 and 1933.

== Competitive highlights ==
With Lilly Gaillard

International
Event	1931	1932	1933
World Championships	4th		
European Championships	3rd	2nd	2nd
National
Austrian Championships	1st	1st	2nd
