= Henryk Bilor =

Polish sportsperson and soldier (1889–1940)

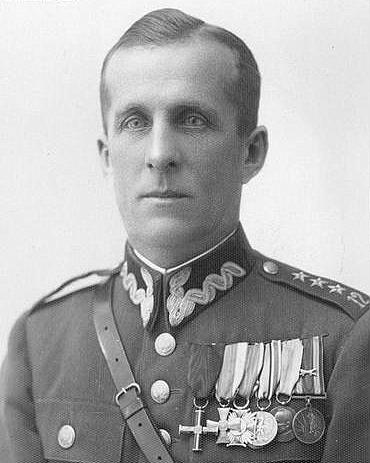
- Bilor in a military uniform
- Born: Henryk Józef Bilor; 19 November 1889; Lemberg, Austrian Poland
- Died: May or June 1940 (age 50); Kyiv, Soviet Union
- Resting place: Bykivnia graves (presumably)
- Occupations: Sportsperson, soldier

Henryk Józef Bilor (19 November 1889 – May or June 1940) was a Polish footballer, sport activist, founder of the Czarni Lwów football club, and a military officer. A victim of the Katyn massacre.

== Biography ==
Bilor was born on 19 November 1889 in Lemberg (later known as Lwów, now Lviv), in Austria-Hungary (Austrian Partition of Poland). His sister, Zofia Bilorówna, was a figure skater, and his brother, Marian Bilor, was a footballer too.

He attended gymnasium and a real school. In August 1903, together with his brother Marian and their friend Walerian Pappius, he founded the school football section called Sława Lwów, which would eventually evolve into the Czarni Lwów club. Since 1913, Bilor studied at the Lemberg Polytechnic.

Following the start of the First World War, in August 1914 Bilor joined the Polish Legions. During the war, he participated in football matches between Polish soldiers. During the Polish–Ukrainian War, Bilor took part in the Battle of Lemberg as an artillery officer.

In independent Poland, he was promoted to the rank of artillery second lieutenant in 1919. He remained a member of the Czarni Lwów club and took part in the Polish football champions. He was supposed to represent Poland in football at the 1920 Summer Olympics, but the Polish team did not attend the olympics due to the ongoing Polish–Soviet War. He participated in pro-Polish agitation in Upper Silesia before the 1921 plebiscite. He broke his leg in a propaganda "match of Polish Silesia" between Czarni Lwów and local Silesian footballers on 29 June 1920.

In 1921, Bilor became a lieutenant, and since 1923 he was a captain. Other than football, he also practiced skiing. In 1922, he was a bronze medalist of Polish skiing championships. He trained the Janina Złoczów football club. He worked in the local football association.

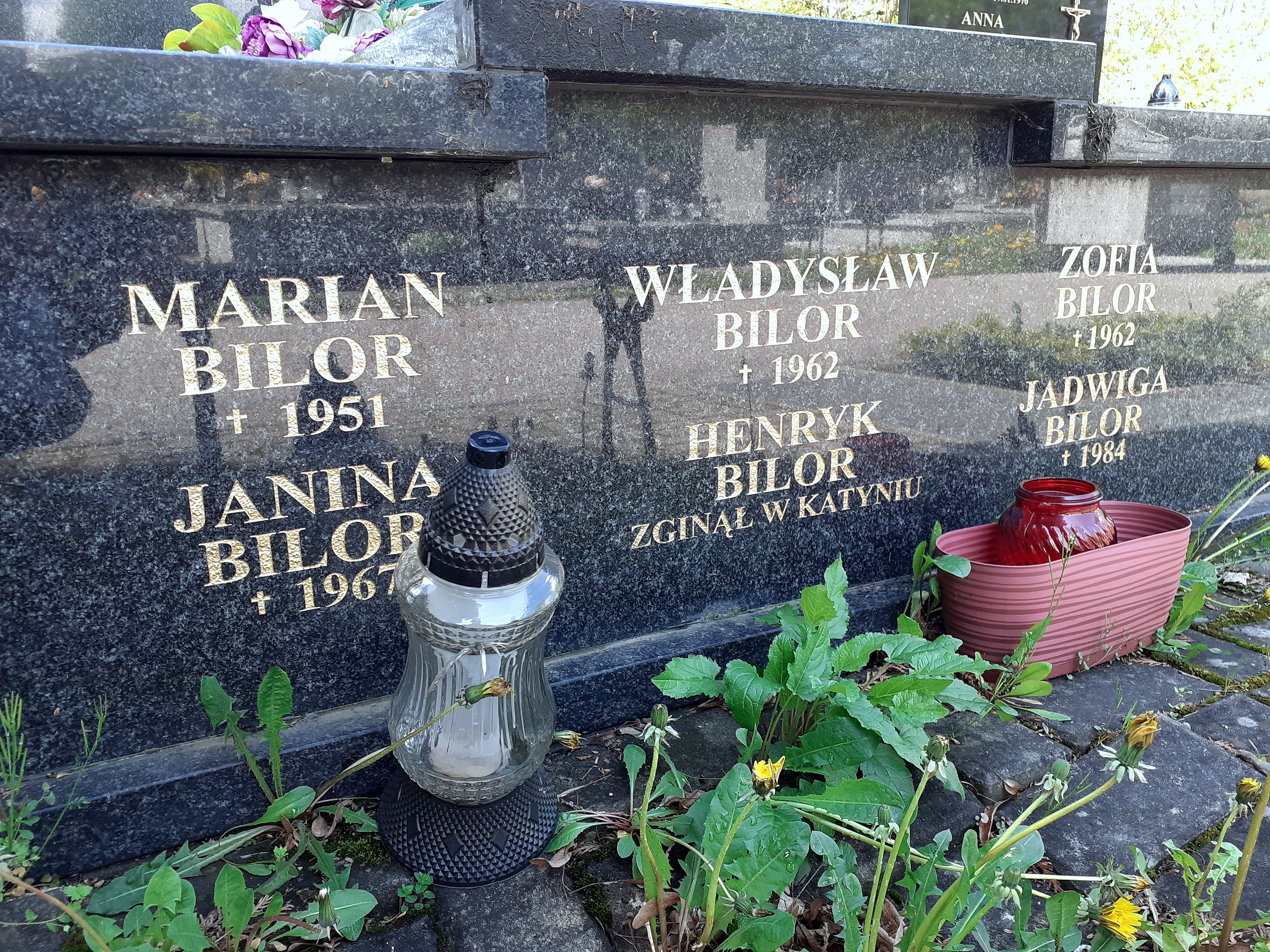
Symbolic tomb at a cemetery in Rzeszów

Following the Soviet invasion of Poland at the start of the Second World War, Bilor took part in the Battle of Lwów. Following the city's capitulation, he was taken prisoner by the Soviets. According to the Ukrainian Katyn List, published in 1994, Bilor was executed in May or June 1940 in the NKVD prison in Kyiv. His place of burial remains unknown, but is presumed to be the Bykivnia graves.

== Honours ==
Honours awarded to Bilor included:

- Cross of Independence
- Cross of Valour
- Silver Cross of Merit (twice)

== Bibliography ==
- Zdziarski, Maciej (2023), Sportowcy dla Niepodległej: Katyń, Kraków: Instytut Łukasiewicza, ISBN 978-83-967147-0-1
