= Lilly Scholz =

Austrian figure skater (1903–1994)

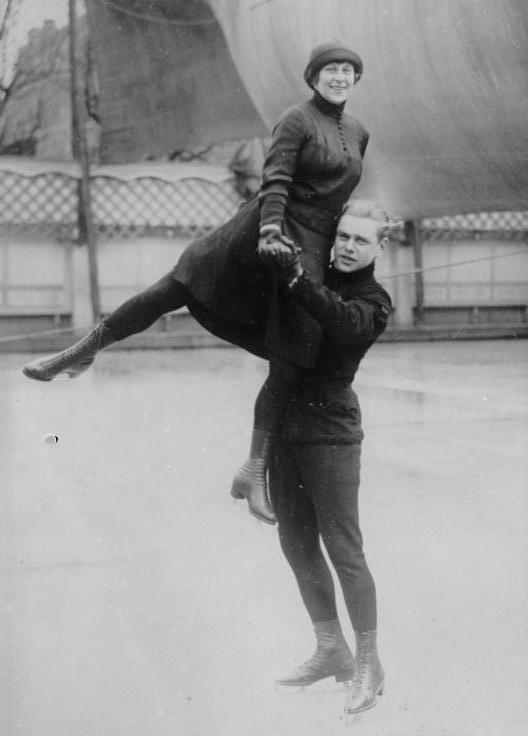
- Scholz and Kaiser at a pre-Olympic event in 1928

Personal information
- Full name: Carolina Anna Elisabeth Scholz
- Other names: Lilly Gaillard
- Born: 18 April 1903 Vienna, Austria-Hungary
- Died: 14 December 1994 (aged 91) Vienna, Austria

Figure skating career
- Country: Austria
- Partner: Willy Petter; Otto Kaiser
- Retired: 1933
Medal record
Representing Austria
Figure skating: Pairs
Olympic Games
Silver medal – second place	1928 St. Moritz	Pairs
World Championships
Gold medal – first place	1929 Budapest	Pairs
Silver medal – second place	1928 London	Pairs
Silver medal – second place	1927 Vienna	Pairs
Silver medal – second place	1926 Berlin	Pairs
Bronze medal – third place	1925 Vienna	Pairs
European Championships
Silver medal – second place	1933 London	Pairs
Silver medal – second place	1932 Paris	Pairs
Bronze medal – third place	1931 St. Moritz	Pairs

Lilly Scholz (married name Gaillard; 18 April 1903 – 14 December 1994) was an Austrian pair skater. Competing in partnership with Otto Kaiser, she became the 1928 Olympic silver medalist and 1929 World champion. The pair won the bronze medal at Worlds in 1925 and silver from 1926 through 1928. Scholz later competed with Willy Petter and won three European medals.

== Results ==
=== With Willy Petter ===
International
Event	1931	1932	1933
World Championships	4th		
European Championships	3rd	2nd	2nd
National
Austrian Championships	1st	1st	2nd

=== With Otto Kaiser ===
International
Event	1924	1925	1926	1927	1928	1929
Winter Olympics					2nd	
World Championships		3rd	2nd	2nd	2nd	1st
National
Austrian Championships	1st			1st	1st	1st
