= Alise Dzeguze =

Latvian figure skater

Personal information
- Full name: Alise Antonija Dzeguze
- Nationality: Latvian
- Born: 15 April 1914; Riga
- Died: 23 September 1999 (aged 85); Toronto, Ontario, Canada

Sport
- Sport: Figure skating

Alise Antonija Dzeguze (15 April 1914 – 23 September 1999) was a Latvian figure skater. She competed in the ladies' singles event at the 1936 Winter Olympics.
