= Hedy Stenuf =

Austrian figure skater

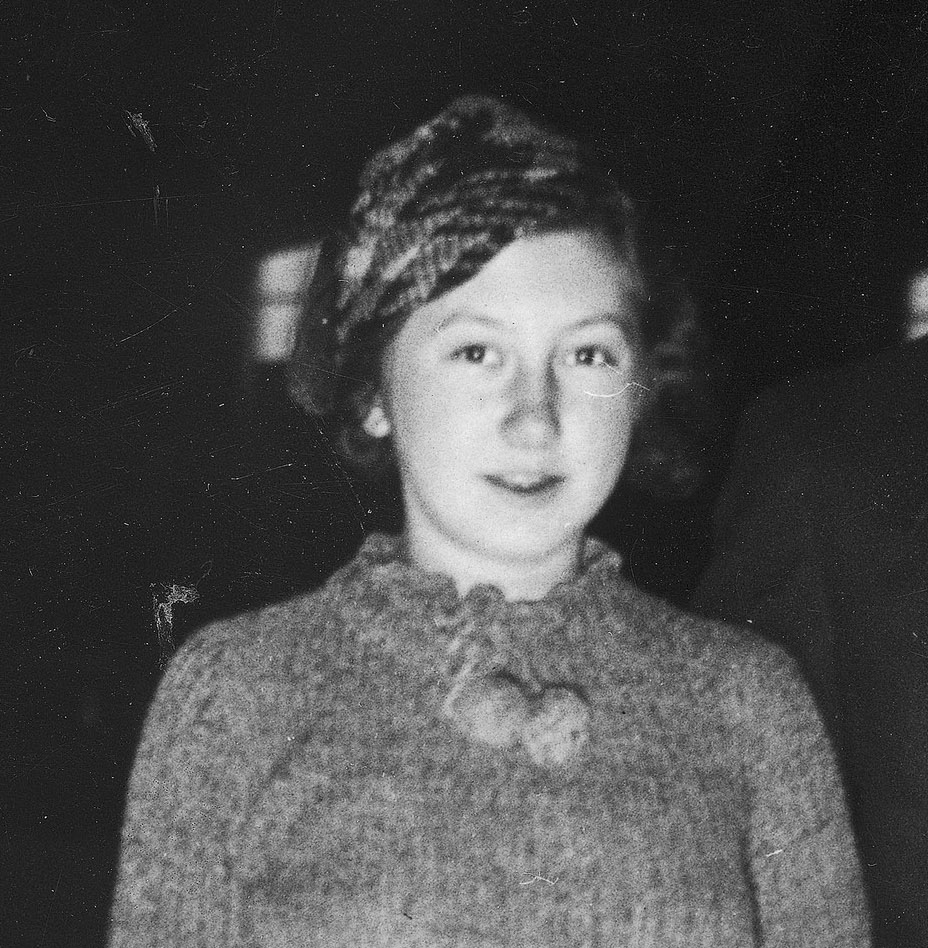
- Hedy Stenuf in 1936

Personal information
- Born: July 18, 1922 Vienna, Austria-Hungary
- Died: November 7, 2010 (aged 88) Hallandale Beach, Florida, U.S.

Figure skating career
- Country: United States; France; Austria
Medal record
Representing the United States
Figure skating: Ladies' singles
World Championships
Silver medal – second place	1939 London	Ladies' singles
Bronze medal – third place	1938 Stockholm	Ladies' singles

Hedy Stenuf Byram (July 18, 1922 – November 7, 2010) was an Austrian figure skater who later competed for France and the United States. Representing the United States, she became a two-time World medalist.

== Life and career ==
Stenuf was born in Vienna with the name Hedwig Stenuf. Her father Joseph Stenuf moved to Rochester where he worked as an accountant before he was joined by Stenuf, her mother Caroline and younger brother Theodore in 1937.

She first became known in the United States in 1934, when as an eleven-year-old she accompanied the Austrian champion Karl Schäfer on an exhibition tour in North America. The following season, she began appearing at major international competitions, placing 7th at the 1935 European Championships and fourth at the 1935 World Championships, which were held in her hometown of Vienna. She was considered a strong challenger to reigning champion Sonja Henie.

At the 1936 Winter Olympics, Stenuf finished sixth in the singles competition.

Later in 1937, she switched to competing for France, and then in 1938, to the United States. She won bronze and silver medals at the World Championships in 1938 and 1939, respectively. In addition to her accomplishments in single skating, she also competed in pair skating with partner Skippy Baxter; the pair won silver at the 1940 U.S. Figure Skating Championships.

In 1943 Stenuf married Dixon Beale Perry-Smith (1922–1989), the third son of Oliver Perry-Smith. At her death she went by the name Hedy Stenuf Byram.

== Competitive highlights ==
=== Ladies' singles ===
International
Event	1935	1936	1937	1938	1939	1940
Winter Olympics		6th^{1}				
World Championships	4th^{1}		4th^{2}	3rd^{3}	2nd^{3}	
European Championships	7th^{1}	6th^{1}	4th^{2}			
National
U.S. Championships						2nd
Austrian Championships	3rd	2nd				
Representing ^{1} Austria, ^{2} France, ^{3} the United States

=== Pairs with Baxter ===
National
Event	1940
U.S. Championships	2nd
