= 1932 European Figure Skating Championships =

Figure skating competition

1932 European Championships
- Type: ISU Championship
- Season: 1931–32
- Location: Paris, France

Champions
- Men's singles: (Austria) Karl Schäfer
- Ladies' singles: (Norway) Sonja Henie
- Pairs: (France) Andrée Joly / Pierre Brunet
- Previous: 1931 European Championships
- Next: 1933 European Championships

The 1932 European Figure Skating Championships were held in Paris, France. Elite senior-level figure skaters from European ISU member nations competed for the title of European Champion in the disciplines of men's singles, ladies' singles, and pair skating.

== Results ==
=== Men ===
Rank	Name	Places
1	(Austria) Karl Schäfer	
2	(Germany) Ernst Baier	
3	(Austria) Erich Erdös	
4	(Austria) Hugo Distler	
5	(Austria) Otto Hartmann	
6	(France) Jean Henrion	
7	(France) Georges Torchon	

=== Ladies ===
Rank	Name	Places
1	(Norway) Sonja Henie	
2	(Austria) Fritzi Burger	
3	(Sweden) Vivi-Anne Hultén	
4	(Austria) Hilde Holovsky	
5	(Austria) Liselotte Landbeck	
6	(Belgium) Yvonne de Ligne-Geurts	
7	(United Kingdom) Joan Dix	
8	(France) Gaby Clericetti	
9	(Kingdom of Italy) Reneé Volpato	
10	(France) Jacqueline Vaudecrane	

=== Pairs ===
Rank	Name	Places
1	(France) Andrée Joly / Pierre Brunet	
2	(Austria) Lilly Gaillard / Willy Petter	
3	(Austria) Idi Papez / Karl Zwack	
4	(United Kingdom) Lavender / MacKenzie	
