= Tairen Soul =

Novel series by C.L. Wilson

The Tairen Soul
- Lord of the Fading Lands; Lady of Light and Shadows; King of Sword and Sky; Queen of Song and Souls; Crown of Crystal and Flames
- Author: C. L. Wilson
- Country: United States
- Language: English
- Genre: Fantasy and Romance
- Publisher: Avon Books (US)
- Published in English: 2007-2010

Tairen Soul is a series of high fantasy romance novel series by C. L. Wilson.

== Books ==
Tairen Soul, can be read in chronological order or order of publication. The author has recommended reading in publication order as listed below.

- Lord of the Fading Lands (2007)
- Lady of Light and Shadows (2007)
- King of Sword and Sky (2008)
- Queen of Song and Souls (2009)
- Crown of Crystal and Flames (2010)

== Characters ==
- Ellysetta Baristani: The adopted daughter of master woodcarver Sol Baristani and his wife, Ellysetta was found abandoned in the forest north of Norban when she was a baby. Afflicted throughout her youth by frightening, violent seizures diagnosed as demon possession, Ellysetta has always feared the dark dangers of magic, even while she's been inexorably drawn to all things Fey. The poetry and legends of the shapeshifting Rain Tairen Soul, in particular, have fascinated her all her life. And when the infamous Fey king steps from the sky to claim Ellie as his truemate, she finds herself swept into the very center of a struggle filled with the magic and darkness she has always feared, and the consuming passion she has always secretly longed for.
- Rainier vel'En Daris: Rain Tairen Soul, a master of all five Fey magics and the only living Fey capable of shapeshifting into one of the magical, winged tairen of the Fading Lands, Rain Tairen Soul has survived what no Fey ever has: the death of his mate. When the Mages killed his beloved e'tani, Sariel, during the Wars, he went mad with grief and scorched the world, decimating half an entire continent in days and turning the dark forests of Eld into smoldering ashlands. Only the combined will of every tairen and shei'dalin in the Fading Lands managed to stop him. For the last thousand years he has lived in madness and torment, waiting for another Tairen Soul to be born so he can at last join Sariel in death. Now that darkness is rising again in the homeland of his enemies, and his soul-kin the tairen are dying. Rain Tairen Soul must return to the world to confront evil once more.
- Vadim Maur: The white-haired, silver-eyed High Mage of Eld. At 1,800 years old he is nearing the end of his unusually long first incarnation. After the scorching of the world, he assumed leadership over all the Mages who had escaped Rain Tairen Soul's wrath and has been quietly and secretly rebuilding the strength and power of the Mages beneath the dark, forested surface of Eld.
- Kolis Manza: Kolis currently serves his master in Celieria, Vadim Maur. If his efforts succeed, the Fey-Celierian alliance will fall and all of Celieria will become subservient to the Mages.

== Races ==
Eloran is home to several races, including Celierians, Fey, Elves, Danae, and Eld.

=== Celierians ===
Bordered by the Pereline Ocean to the east, and four of the World's most powerful magical races to the north, west, and south, Celieria exists as a buffering island of humanity in a sea of magical and immortal beings. Ruled by a King whose ancestors include a powerful Fey shei'dalin, Celieria has long been a close ally of the Fey. For a thousand years, the alliance stood strong and unchallenged, but times are changing. Distrust of the Fey is growing.

=== Fey ===
The Fey are a race of legendary, fiercely powerful immortals. Also called the Shining Folk for their incomparable beauty and the faint luminosity of their pale skin, the Fey are champions of Light who throughout the millennia have willingly sacrificed themselves again and again to defeat the forces of darkness in the World. Their greatest enemies are the followers of Seledorn, God of Shadows, chief among them the dark-souled Mages of Eld. The Fey used to mingle freely with other races, but after the devastation of the Mage Wars, they returned to the Fading Lands, erected the Faering Mists, and withdrew from the World.

==== About the Fey ====
Physically, all Fey are tall and slender, with pale, flawless skin that shines with a faint, silvery luminescence. Fey have bright, distinctive eyes with slightly elongated, pupils that can lengthen and widen like a cat's. Their eyes glow when they work magic or are under intense emotion.

Fey women are empaths and healers. Though powerful in their own right, their heightened empathic senses leave many of them vulnerable and unable to defend themselves against aggression. The strongest and most magically-gifted of the women are called shei'dalins, Truthspeakers. Though shei'dalins, like all Fey women, cannot kill, they can use touch to force truth from even the most hardened criminal and leave them weeping like infants. Shei'dalins can also use their empathy as a weapon, forcing evildoers to live each acute emotion suffered by every victim impacted by their crime. Most criminals would rather be drawn and quartered than suffer a shei'dalin's touch.

Fey men are trained from boyhood to be warriors, as fierce and deadly with magic as they are with the numerous swords and throwing daggers they wear. Each level in the Dance of Knives (warrior's training) takes decades to complete. Only the greatest and most powerful of Fey warriors, those who have completed a full four hundred years of weapons and magic training and who have achieved total mastery of at least one branch of Fey magic earn the right to guard a shei'dalin as a member of her cha'kor, her quintet of five Fey warriors who guard her with their lives when she leaves the safety of the Fading Lands.

Fey children possess a small amount of magic, but it is not until adolescence that the Fey come into the fullness of their gifts. Each young Fey boy must undertake a Soul Quest, a physical and spiritual journey, to discover the nature of his magical gifts and gain an understanding of his true soul. Upon completion of that quest, the tairen present the boy with his sorreisu'kiyr "Soul Quest crystal" a magic-amplifying stone made from Tairen's Eye crystal that is uniquely tuned to the magical frequency of the boy who receives it.

Among the Fey, men and women mate for life. There exist two separate and distinct mating bonds: e'tanitsa, bonds of the heart, and shei'tanitsa, bonds of the soul, or truemating. E'tanitsa is a bond that can be chosen between two Fey who love one another. Shei'tanitsa, the truemate bond, is a rare and singular joining of perfectly matched souls. It forms only between two people of equal magical strength, and only where deep and abiding love can form. Shei'tanitsa bonds ensure fertility, and truemates are the only Fey couples capable of bearing female children.

==== Types of Fey ====
- Tairen: Tairen are the magical winged cats of the Fading Lands. Larger than dragons, they resemble giant winged panthers with pupiless, glowing eyes. Unsurpassed predators, they possess dangerous, venom-filled fangs, razor-sharp retractable claws, and they breathe fire. Tairen fire can burn anything: wood, stone, soil, even magic. The tairen live in prides in the volcanic caverns of the Feyls mountain range. Cave-riddled Fey'Bahren, the largest volcano in the Feyls, is home to the tairen nesting lair where all tairen eggs are incubated until hatching. It is on a plateau at the base of the volcano that all adolescent Fey boys gather to be judged by the makai of the Fey'Bahren pride and receive their sorreisu'kiyr, their Soul Quest crystals, after undertaking the journey of self-discovery that reveals the nature of their magic and their true soul. The Fey have a saying, "The tairen lives in us all." Although the exact relationship between the tairen and the Fey is a mystery that has been lost to the mists of time, the two species are so closely intertwined that one cannot survive without the other. If the tairen die, so too will the Fey.
- Tairen Souls: Very rarely, a Fey warrior is born with a master's gift in all five Fey magics. These Fey become feyreisen, Tairen Souls, Fey capable of shapeshifting into a tairen, one of the great, winged cats of the Fading Lands. Tairen Souls are the fiercest defenders of the Fey, and the oldest among them becomes the Feyreisen, King of the Fading Lands, Defender of the Fey. Once there were dozens of Tairen Souls, now only Rain remains. Because of the Tairen Souls' powerful magic and their fierce natures, there has never been a shei'dalin born strong enough to be a feyreisen's truemate. Never, that is, until Rain Tairen Soul meets Ellysetta Baristani.
- Dalh'reisen: Dahl'reisen are former Fey warriors who have been banished from the Fading Lands for killing another Fey or choosing to walk the Shadowed Path. Fey warriors pay a high price for their many gifts. Each time a Fey warrior claims a life, he takes the weight of that soul upon his. He absorbs the pain of that soul's unfulfilled promise, its darkness, its sorrows and regrets, and he carries the weight of it like a burning stone hung round his neck. Unless the warrior is lucky enough to find his truemante, the weight of the souls he has taken will eventually become too much for him to bear. When the stain on his soul grows so dark it threatens to consume him, the warrior has only two choices: sheisan'dahlein, the honor death, or becoming dahl'reisen, a lost soul, outcast from the Fading Lands, in danger of turning to Azrahn and other dark magics, doomed for eternity. Dahl'reisen live outside the bounds of Fey honor and serve as bodyguards and mercenaries to Lords and Kings. Each of them is a veteran of countless wars, and each is a brutally efficient and merciless killing machine. They are capable of many things a Fey would find abhorrent. The torment of their souls is so great, empathetic Fey women cannot bear to be near them.

==== Fey Magic ====
Fey magic is composed of four elementals and two mystics, although all Fey are prohibited from wielding Azrahn, one of the two mystics.

- Earth (Telah). Earth magic appears as glowing green threads when woven. It is the magic that controls solid mass. Masters of earth can create inanimate physical objects using Earth. In a Fey woman's hands, Earth can also be used to enhance fertility and perform healing. Warriors on the battlefield use Earth to temporarily patch wounds, but true healing, particularly of grievous wounds, requires a Fey woman's touch.
- Air (Leiss). Air magic appears as glowing white threads. It is the magic that controls the winds and other vapors. Masters of Air can summon great winds, create and disperse tornados, weave the oxygen out of an enemy's lungs, and float or glide on cushions of air.
- Fire (Shera). Fire magic appears as glowing red-orange threads when woven. It is the magic that controls heat, cold and energy. Masters of Fire can ignite or quench flames raise or drastically lower the temperature of any object or area, and even spawn lightning.
- Water (Felas). Water magic appears as glowing blue threads when woven. It is the magic that controls water and other liquids. Water masters can create fountains, redirect rivers, raise and lower the tides, and more.
- Spirit (Mena). Spirit magic appears as glowing lavender threads when woven. It is the magic of consciousness, thought, memory, sensory perception, and illusion. Fey can send and receive thoughts to and from any other conscious being using Spirit (telepathy). Masters of Spirit can weave illusion so detailed it seems like reality, render someone unconscious, plant or erase memories, control thoughts, and manipulate senses. One common use of Spirit is invisibility weaves.

Azreisenahn, more commonly called Azrahn. Azrahn is the soul magic, the unmaker, the magic that can control and manipulate souls of the living and the dead, including demons. Azrahn appears as shadowy black threads when woven, and the eyes of a person wielding Azrahn appear as black pits sparkling with red lights. Fey are forbidden, upon pain of banishment, to wield this dark, dangerous magic, and very little is known about its uses or limitations. The Eld Mages, however, wield it freely. Through Azrahn, the Mages can claim souls and force them to do their bidding as well as summon and control demons.

All Fey wield one or more of the four Elemental magics of the World and the mystic Spirit, though with varying degrees of mastery. Magic is spun as threads which are woven into a pattern. Multiple branches of magic can be interwoven to great effect. Fivefold weaves, which combine all four elementals and the one mystic controlled by the Fey, are extremely powerful, and the only defense against demons.

=== Elves ===
The Elves closely resemble the Fey in appearance except for their tapered ears and golden-brown skin. The Elves are woodsmen, hunters and bowmen of great renown. They are led by their prince, Galad Hawksheart, Lord of Valorian, whose home lies in the heart of Deepwood, and by his twin sister, Illona Brighthand, who lives in the cloudforests of the Silvermist mountains. The Elves follow an ancient and complex prophecy called The Dance, through which it is said all the secrets of the World can be revealed.

=== Danae ===
The groves and marshes of Danael serve as home to an elusive race of beings called the Danae. Although the Danae came to the aid of the Fey and Elves during the Mage Wars, they prefer to remain isolated from the rest of the world. Mortal lore is full of caution about Danae tree and water spirits who delight in luring intruders to their doom.

=== Eld ===
The Eld are a race of long-lived mortal beings ruled by powerful sorcerous Mages who devote their lives to mastering the darkest magics of the world. The Mages are ruled by the Mage Council, which is headed by the High Mage of Eld. Unlike the Fey, who will live many thousands of years barring a mortal blow or the death of a bonded mate, Eld do eventually age and die, but the Mages have learned how to extend their already naturally long lives through magic. Instead of the normal Eld lifespan of two hundred years, Mages can live nearly a thousand years in each of up to six incarnations.
