= Idi Papez =

Austrian pair skater

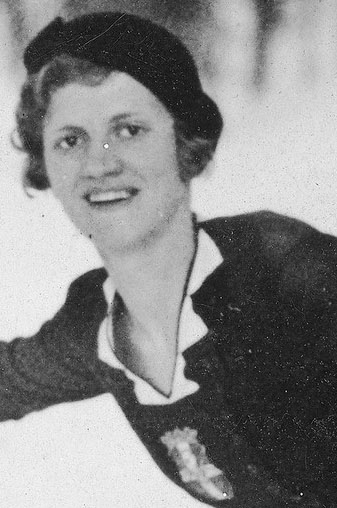
- Papez in 1933

Personal information
- Full name: Idi Papez

Figure skating career
- Country: Austria
- Partner: Karl Zwack
Medal record
Pairs Figure skating
Representing Austria
World Championships
| Silver medal – second place | 1934 Helsinki | Pairs |
| Silver medal – second place | 1933 Montreal | Pairs |
| Bronze medal – third place | 1931 Berlin | Pairs |
European Championships
| Silver medal – second place | 1935 St. Moritz | Pairs |
| Silver medal – second place | 1934 Prague | Pairs |
| Gold medal – first place | 1933 London | Pairs |
| Bronze medal – third place | 1932 Paris | Pairs |

Idi Papez was an Austrian pair skater. With partner Karl Zwack, she was the 1933 European Champion and was a three-time World medalist.

== Results ==
(with Karl Zwack)

International
| Event | 1930 | 1931 | 1932 | 1933 | 1934 | 1935 |
|---|---|---|---|---|---|---|
| World Championships | | 3rd | | 2nd | 2nd | |
| European Championships | 5th | | 3rd | 1st | 2nd | 2nd |
National
| Austrian Championships | | 2nd | 2nd | 1st | 1st | 1st |
