= Karl Zwack =

Austrian pair skater

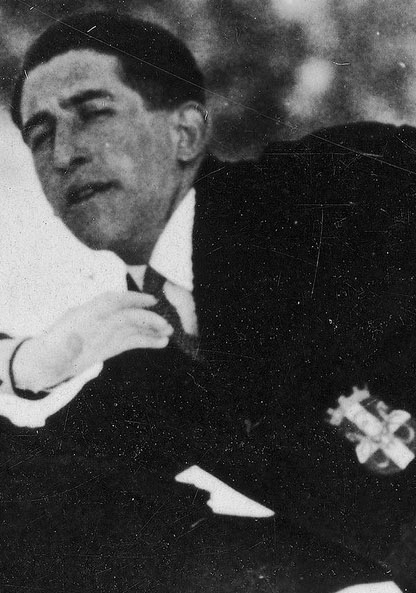
- Zwack in 1933

Personal information
- Full name: Karl Zwack

Figure skating career
- Country: Austria
- Partner: Idi Papez
Medal record
Pairs Figure skating
Representing Austria
World Championships
Silver medal – second place	1934 Helsinki	Pairs
Silver medal – second place	1933 Montreal	Pairs
Bronze medal – third place	1931 Berlin	Pairs
European Championships
Silver medal – second place	1935 St. Moritz	Pairs
Silver medal – second place	1934 Prague	Pairs
Gold medal – first place	1933 London	Pairs
Bronze medal – third place	1932 Paris	Pairs

Karl Zwack was an Austrian pair skater. With partner Idi Papez, he was the 1933 European Champion and was a three-time World medalist.

== Results ==
(with Idi Papez)

International
Event	1930	1931	1932	1933	1934	1935
World Championships		3rd		2nd	2nd	
European Championships	5th		3rd	1st	2nd	2nd
National
Austrian Championships		2nd	2nd	1st	1st	1st
