= C. L. Wilson =

American novelist

C.L. Wilson
- Born: December 14, 1973 (age 52); Bradenton, Florida, U.S.
- Occupations: Novelist; screenwriter; producer
- Writing career
- Period: 2000–present
- Genres: Fantasy; Romance; Science fiction
- Notable work: Tairen Soul series
- Website: clwilson.com

C. L. Wilson is a cross-genre American author. She is known for her 5-part Romance and High Fantasy books Tairen Soul series, as well as her ongoing Weathermages of Mystral series. In addition to this, Wilson has also written a collection of science fiction short stories titled Futuristic Romance. She has also collaborated with authors Erica Ridley and Elissa Wilds on the short story collection One Enchanted Season.

Her most widely held book, is in 903 libraries, according to WorldCat

== Bibliography ==
=== Tairen Soul series ===
- Lord of the Fading Lands (October 2, 2007)
- Lady of Light and Shadows (October 30, 2007)
- King of Sword and Sky (September 30, 2008)
- Queen of Song and Souls (October 27, 2009)
- Crown of Crystal and Flames (October 26, 2010)

=== Weathermages of Mystral series ===
- The Winter King (July 29, 2014)
- The Sea King (October 31, 2017)
