= Rezső Dillinger =

Hungarian figure skater

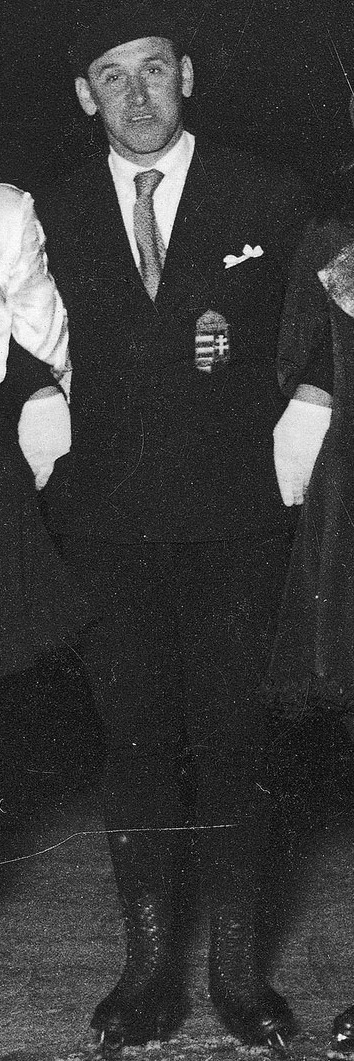
- Dillinger at the 1935 World Championships

Figure skating career
- Country: Hungary
Medal record
Representing Hungary
Pairs figure skating
World Championships
Bronze medal – third place	1935 Budapest	Pairs
European Championships
Bronze medal – third place	1935 St. Moritz	Pairs

Rezső Dillinger was a Hungarian figure skater who competed in pair skating.

With partner Lucy Galló, in 1935 he won bronze medals at both the World Figure Skating Championships and the European Figure Skating Championships.

== Competitive highlights ==
With Lucy Galló

Event	1934	1935
World Championships		3rd
European Championships	4th	3rd
