= Dénes Pataky =

Hungarian figure skater

Personal information
- Born: 25 June 1916
- Died: 7 April 1987 (aged 70)

Figure skating career
- Country: Hungary
Medal record
Representing Hungary
Men's Figure skating
World Championships
Bronze medal – third place	1935 Budapest	Men's singles
European Championships
Silver medal – second place	1934 Prague	Men's singles

Dénes Pataky (25 June 1916 – 7 April 1987) was a Hungarian figure skater who competed in men's singles. He was a four-time gold medalist at the Hungarian Figure Skating Championships from 1933 to 1936. He also won the silver medal at the 1934 European Figure Skating Championships, won the bronze medal at the 1935 World Figure Skating Championships, and finished ninth at the 1936 Winter Olympics.

== Results ==
Event	1931	1932	1933	1934	1935	1936	1937	1938
Winter Olympic Games						9th		
World Championships				5th	3rd	6th		
European Championships				2nd				
Hungarian Championships	3rd	3rd	1st	1st	1st	1st		3rd
