= Jack Dunn (figure skater) =

British figure skater (1917-1938)

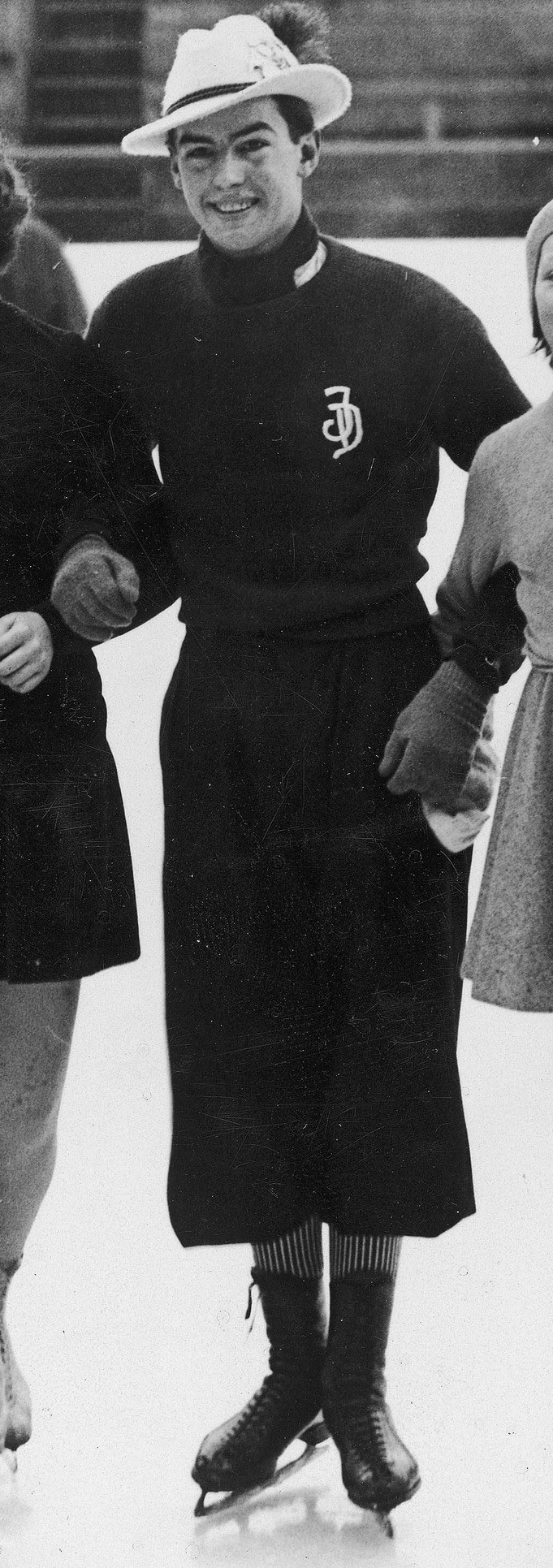
- Dunn at the 1936 Winter Olympics

Personal information
- Full name: John Edward Powell Dunn
- Born: 28 March 1917
- Died: 16 July 1938 (aged 21) Hollywood, Los Angeles

Figure skating career
- Country: United Kingdom
Medal record
Representing United Kingdom
Men's Figure skating
World Championships
Silver medal – second place	1935 Budapest	Men's singles

John Edward Powell Dunn (28 March 1917 – 16 July 1938) was a British figure skater who competed in the 1930s. His best finish was a silver medal at the 1935 World Figure Skating Championships.

Dunn was a close friend and lover of Sonja Henie, who was training in London towards the end of her competitive career. Following Henie's victory at the 1936 Winter Olympics, where Dunn placed sixth in the singles event, he accompanied the Henie family to the United States and became her professional skating partner in her touring ice show for the next two years. Their relationship ended when Henie became involved with Tyrone Power. Shortly afterward, in 1938, Dunn died from tularemia contracted from handling a rabbit while on a hunting trip in Texas. He died in Hollywood.

At the time of his death Dunn had appeared in the movie Everybody's Girl, been cast by producer Edward Small in the lead of The Duke of West Point (1938) and was in the running to play Rudolph Valentino in a film based on that actor's life.

== Results ==
Event	1934	1935	1936
Winter Olympic Games			6th
World Championships		2nd	4th
European Championships	6th	4th	
British Championships	2nd	2nd	
