= Salchow =

Salchow is a surname. Notable people with the surname include:

- Josha Salchow (born 1999), German competitive swimmer
- Kelly Salchow (born 1973), American rower
- Mitch Michaels (Richard Salchow, born 1948), American rock and roll radio DJ
- Ulrich Salchow (1877–1949), Swedish figure skater
  - Salchow jump, a figure skating jump named after him
  - ISU Junior Grand Prix in Sweden, originally called the Salchow Trophy
