= Fritzi Metznerová =

Czech figure skater

Personal information
- Nationality: Czech
- Born: 16 December 1915
- Died: 16 January 1997 (aged 81)

Sport
- Sport: Figure skating

Fritzi Metznerová (16 December 1915 – 16 January 1997) was a Czech figure skater. She competed in the ladies' singles event at the 1936 Winter Olympics.
