= Herta Frey-Dexler =

Swiss figure skater

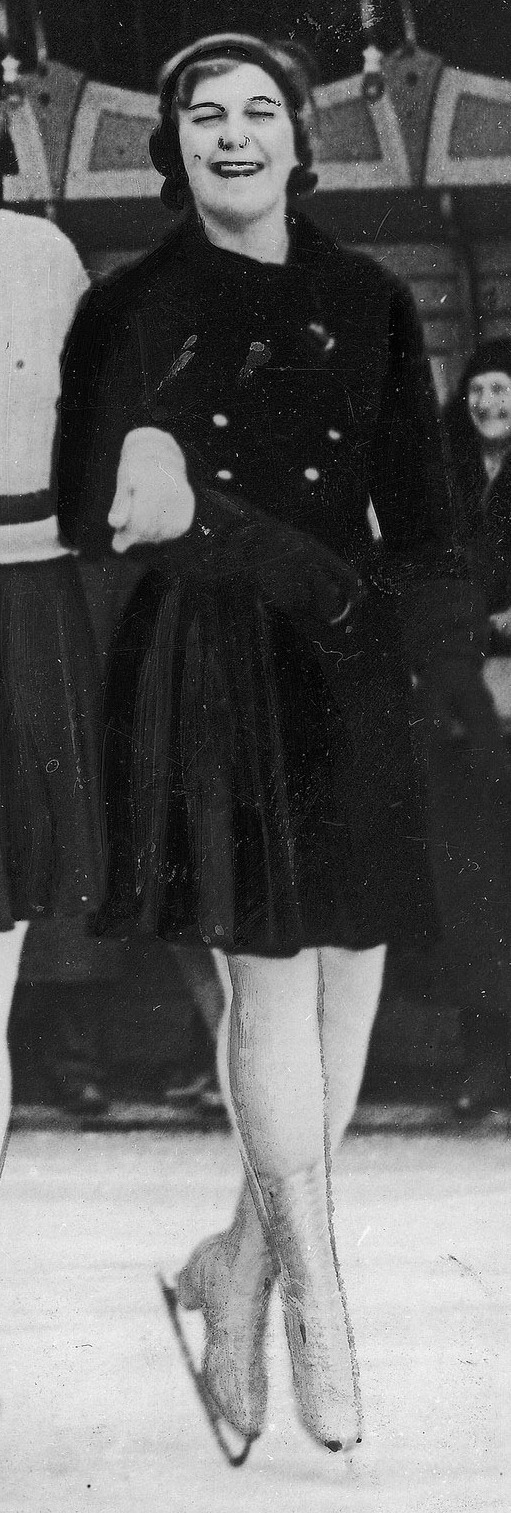
- Herta Frey Dexler

Personal information
- Nationality: Swiss
- Born: 16 January 1917; Vienna, Austria-Hungary
- Died: 10 January 1999 (aged 81); Zürich, Switzerland

Sport
- Sport: Figure skating

Herta Frey-Dexler (16 January 1917 – 10 January 1999) was a Swiss figure skater. She competed in the ladies' singles event at the 1936 Winter Olympics.
