= Zofia Bilorówna =

Polish figure skater

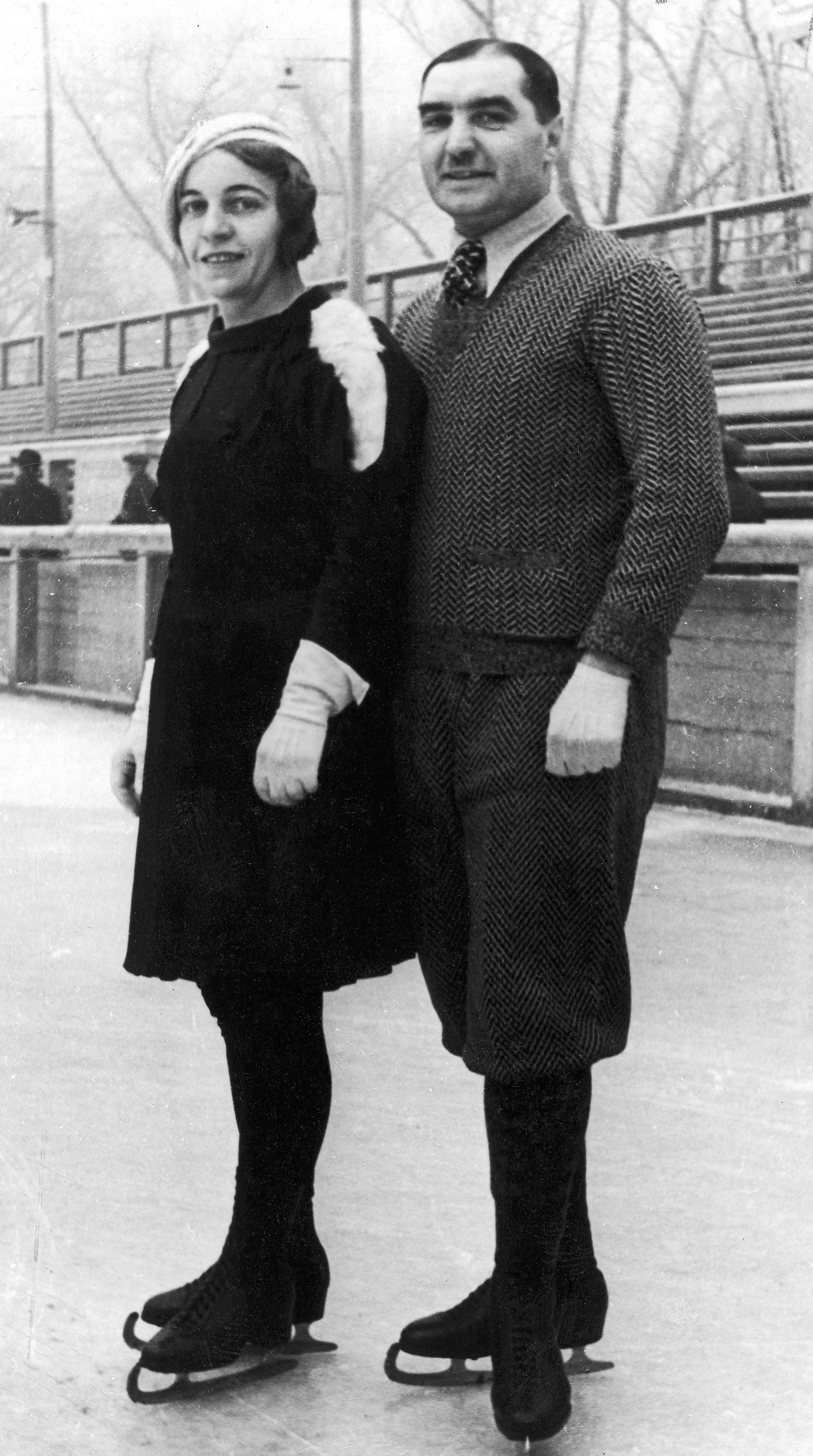
- Bilor with her partner Kowalski at the 1934 European Championships

Personal information
- Born: 16 June 1895 Lwów, Austro-Hungary
- Died: 23 June 1962 (aged 67) Rzeszów

Figure skating career
- Country: Poland
- Retired: 1935
Medal record
Representing Poland
Figure skating: Pairs
European Championships
Bronze medal – third place	1934 Prague	Pairs

Zofia Bilorówna (or Zofia Bilor) (16 June 1895 in Lwów – 23 June 1962 in Rzeszów) was a Polish figure skater who competed in pair skating.

With partner Tadeusz Kowalski, she won bronze at the 1934 European Figure Skating Championships.

Bilorówna was from Lwów, the sister of Henryk Bilor, a soldier and football player murdered in the Katyn massacre. Their parents were Tomasz and Zofia.

== Competitive highlights ==
With Tadeusz Kowalski:

Event	1927	1928	1929	1930	1931	1932	1933	1934	1935
World Championships								4th	5th
European Championships								3rd	
Polish Championships	1st	1st	1st	1st	1st	1st	1st	1st	1st
