= Ilse Pausin =

Austrian figure skater (1919–1999)

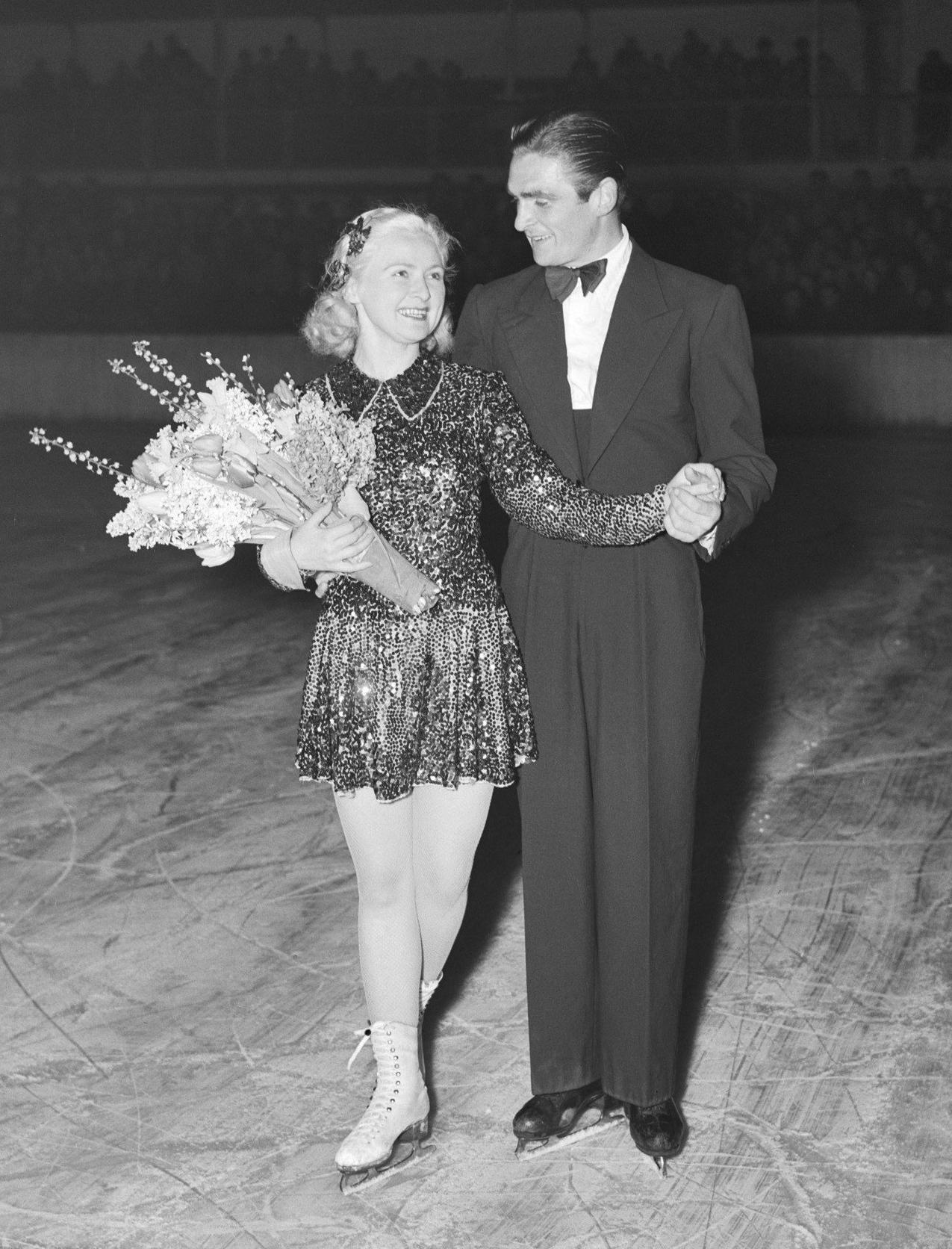
- Ilse and Erik Pausin (1950)

Personal information
- Born: 17 February 1919
- Died: 6 August 1999 (aged 80)

Figure skating career
- Country: Germany; Austria
- Partner: Erich Pausin
- Retired: 1941
Medal record
Figure skating: Pairs
Representing Germany
World Championships
Silver medal – second place	1939 Budapest	Pairs
European Championships
Silver medal – second place	1939 London	Pairs
Representing Austria
Olympic Games
Silver medal – second place	1936 Garmisch-Partenkirchen	Pairs
World Championships
Silver medal – second place	1938 Berlin	Pairs
Silver medal – second place	1937 Vienna	Pairs
Silver medal – second place	1936 Paris	Pairs
Silver medal – second place	1935 Budapest	Pairs
European Championships
Silver medal – second place	1938 St. Moritz	Pairs
Silver medal – second place	1937 Prague	Pairs

Ilse Pausin-Ulrich (née Pausin; 7 February 1919 – 6 August 1999) was an Austrian pair skater. With her brother Erik Pausin, she won the silver medal at the 1936 Winter Olympics at age 17. They won five consecutive silver medals (1935-1939) at the World Figure Skating Championships and three consecutive silver medals (1937-1939) at the European Figure Skating Championships. In 1939, they competed representing Nazi Germany, which swept the Worlds pairs podium that year.

== Results ==
(with Erich Pausin)

International
Event	1935	1936	1937	1938	1939	1940	1941
Winter Olympics		2nd					
World Championships	2nd	2nd	2nd	2nd	2nd		
European Championships	4th		2nd	2nd	2nd		
National
German Championships					2nd		2nd
Austrian Championships	2nd	1st	1st	1st	1st	1st	1st
