= Vivi-Anne Hultén =

Swedish figure skater (1911–2003)

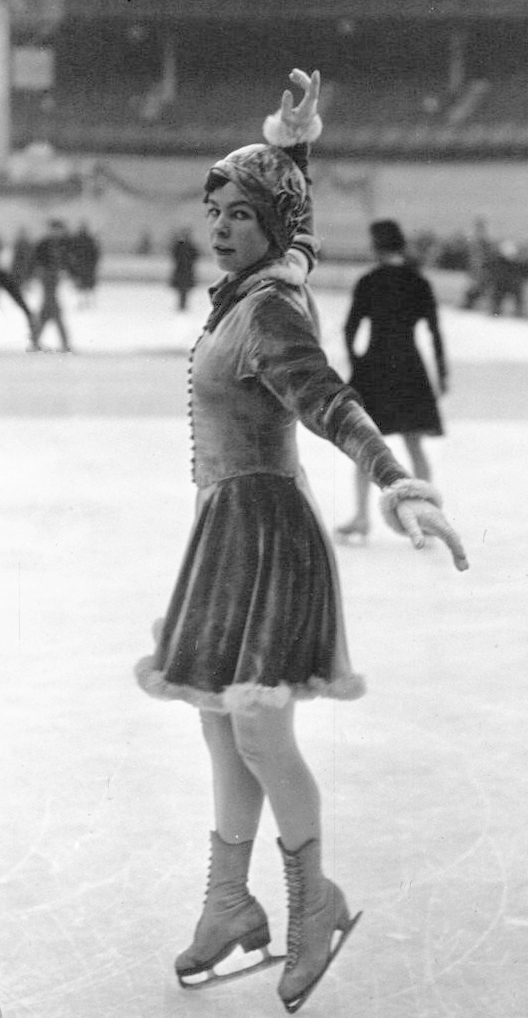
- Vivi-Anne Hultén in 1932

Personal information
- Born: 25 August 1911 Antwerp, Belgium
- Died: 15 January 2003 (aged 91) Corona del Mar, California, United States

Figure skating career
- Country: Sweden
- Skating club: Stockholms Allmänna Skridskoklubb
Medal record
Representing Sweden
Figure skating: Ladies' singles
Olympic Games
Bronze medal – third place	1936 Garmisch-Partenkirchen	Singles
World Championships
Bronze medal – third place	1937 London	Singles
Bronze medal – third place	1936 Paris	Singles
Bronze medal – third place	1935 Vienna	Singles
Silver medal – second place	1933 Stockholm	Singles
European Championships
Bronze medal – third place	1932 Paris	Singles
Bronze medal – third place	1930 Vienna	Singles

Vivi-Anne Hultén (25 August 1911 – 15 January 2003) was a Swedish figure skater who competed in ladies' singles. She was the 1936 Olympic bronze medalist, a four-time World medalist, a two-time European bronze medalist, and a ten-time Swedish national champion.

== Personal life ==
Vivi-Anne Hultén was born in Antwerp, Belgium. She was married twice, first to the American steel importer Nils Tholand. In 1942, she married Gene Theslof, a Finnish figure skater and gymnast, with whom she had a son by the same name. The Teslofs trained their son Gene Theslof III to become a leading adagio skater who toured with Holiday on Ice in the USA during the 1960s. He later became a business executive in California. Hultén died at 91 of heart failure in Corona del Mar, California, surviving her husband by 20 years. She was the grandmother of American professional soccer coach Nick Theslof.

== Career ==
Hultén was coached by a brother of Gillis Grafström. She finished fifth at the 1932 Winter Olympics. In 1933, she finished second to Sonja Henie at the 1933 World Championships held in Stockholm.

Hultén won the bronze medal at the 1936 Winter Olympics in Garmisch-Partenkirchen. When told to do a Nazi salute to Hitler, she declined and said "I am from Sweden. I don't do things like that." Swedish newspapers have named her the country's all-time female athlete. A lake in Budapest has a statue of her performing a spiral.

After turning professional, Hultén toured with the Ice Follies, Ice Cycles, and Ice Capades. She formed an adagio pair with Theslof, her future husband, who had skated with Henie for seven years, and the pair toured the United States and Europe. In the mid 1960s, she settled in the United States and opened a large skating school in St. Paul, Minnesota with Theslof.

Hultén was hired as a skating coach by Herb Brooks for his Minnesota North Stars hockey team. She performed for the King and Queen of Sweden and also skated in ten ice shows with the Ice Capades in Minneapolis, Minnesota up until the age of 80. She actively taught on the ice until age 86.

== Results ==
International
Event	1927	1928	1929	1930	1931	1932	1933	1934	1935	1936	1937
Winter Olympics						5th				3rd	
World Champ.					5th	5th	2nd	4th	3rd	3rd	3rd
European Champ.				3rd	4th	3rd					
National
Swedish Champ.	1st	1st	1st				1st	1st			
