= Sonja Henie =

Norwegian figure skater and film star (1912–1969)

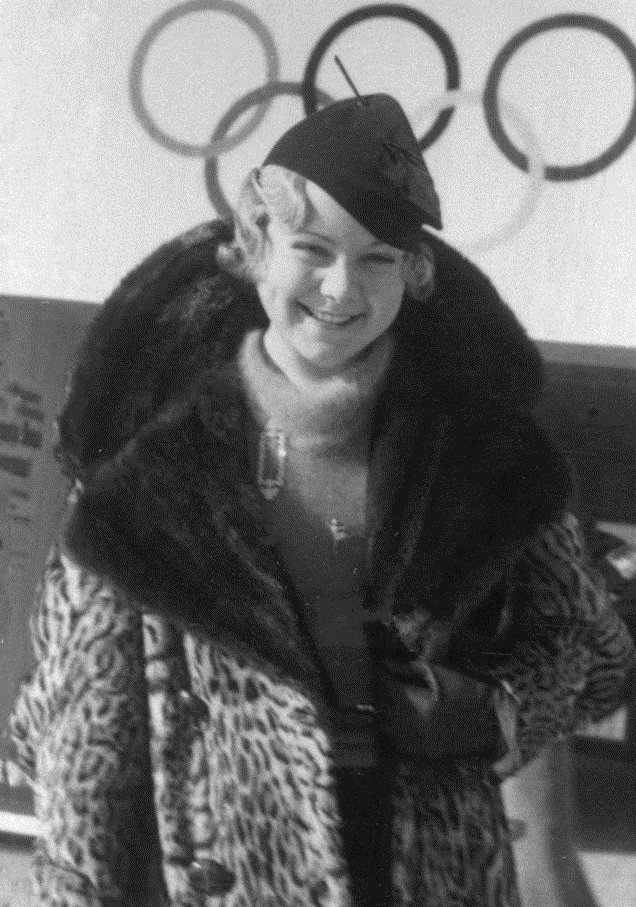
- Henie at the 1936 Olympics

Personal information
- Full name: Sonja Henie
- Born: 8 April 1912 Oslo, Norway
- Died: 12 October 1969 (aged 57) on an ambulance plane flying from Paris to Oslo
- Height: 1.55 m (5 ft 1 in)

Figure skating career
- Country: Norway
- Skating club: Oslo SK
- Retired: 1956
Medal record
Representing Norway
Ladies' Figure skating
Olympic Games
| Gold medal – first place | 1928 St. Moritz | Singles |
| Gold medal – first place | 1932 Lake Placid | Singles |
| Gold medal – first place | 1936 Garmisch-Partenkirchen | Singles |
World Championships
| Gold medal – first place | 1927 Oslo | Singles |
| Gold medal – first place | 1928 London | Singles |
| Gold medal – first place | 1929 Budapest | Singles |
| Gold medal – first place | 1930 New York | Singles |
| Gold medal – first place | 1931 Berlin | Singles |
| Gold medal – first place | 1932 Montreal | Singles |
| Gold medal – first place | 1933 Stockholm | Singles |
| Gold medal – first place | 1934 Oslo | Singles |
| Gold medal – first place | 1935 Vienna | Singles |
| Gold medal – first place | 1936 Paris | Singles |
| Silver medal – second place | 1926 Stockholm | Singles |
European Championships
| Gold medal – first place | 1931 St. Moritz | Singles |
| Gold medal – first place | 1932 Paris | Singles |
| Gold medal – first place | 1933 London | Singles |
| Gold medal – first place | 1934 Prague | Singles |
| Gold medal – first place | 1935 St. Moritz | Singles |
| Gold medal – first place | 1936 Berlin | Singles |

Sonja Henie (8 April 1912 – 12 October 1969) was a Norwegian figure skater and film star. She was a three-time Olympic champion (1928, 1932, 1936) in women's singles, a ten-time World champion (1927–1936) and a six-time European champion (1931–1936). Henie won more Olympic and World titles than any other ladies' figure skater. She is one of only two skaters to successfully defend a ladies' singles Olympic title, the other being Katarina Witt, and her six consecutive European titles have only been matched by Witt.

At the height of Henie's American acting career, she was one of the highest-paid stars in Hollywood and starred in a series of box-office hits, including Thin Ice (1937), Happy Landing (1938), My Lucky Star (1938), Second Fiddle (1939), and Sun Valley Serenade (1941).

== Biography ==
=== Early life ===
Henie was born on 8 April 1912 in Kristiania (now Oslo), Norway; she was the only daughter of Wilhelm Henie (1872–1937), a prosperous Norwegian furrier, and his wife, Selma Lochmann-Nielsen (1888–1961). In addition to the income from the fur business, both of Henie's parents had inherited wealth. Wilhelm Henie had been a one-time World Cycling Champion and the Henie children were encouraged to take up a variety of sports at a young age. Henie initially showed talent at skiing, then followed her older brother, Leif, to take up figure skating. As a girl Henie also was a nationally ranked tennis player, and a skilled swimmer and equestrian. Once Henie began serious training as a figure skater, her formal schooling ended. She was educated by tutors, and her father hired the best experts in the world, including the famous Russian ballerina, Tamara Karsavina, to transform his daughter into a sporting celebrity.

Henie began skating at the age of 5. She enjoyed music and dance from an early age, studying ballet and after starting her competitive skating career, admired the Russian ballet dancer Anna Pavlova after seeing her perform in London.

=== Competitive career ===
Henie skating with Arne Lie in 1925

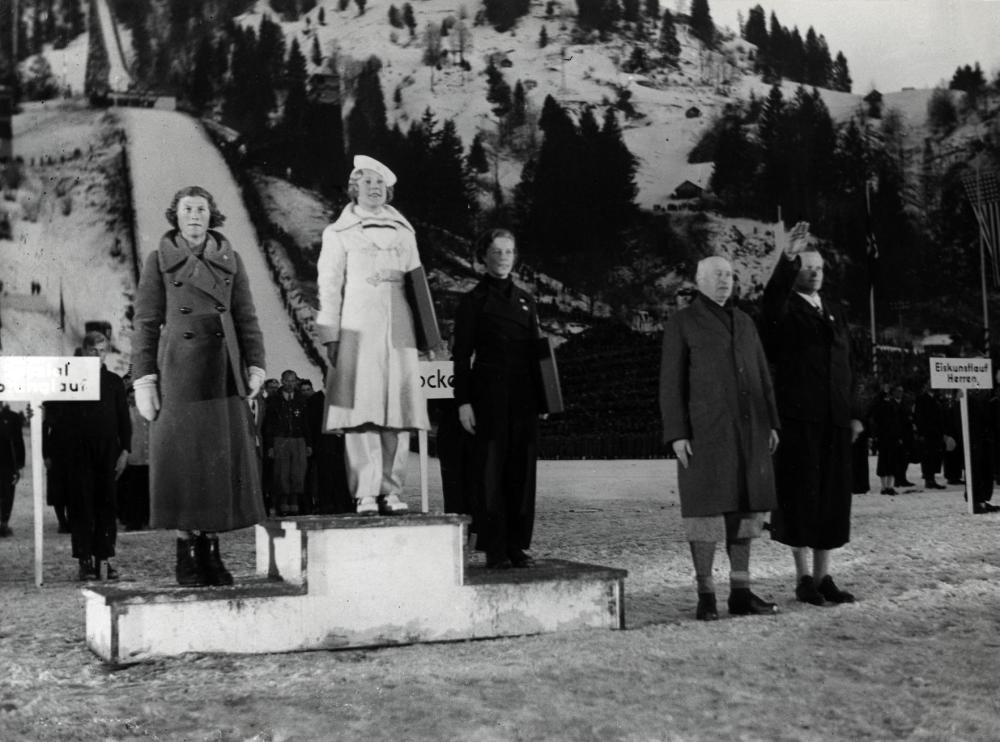
Henie with British skater Cecilia Colledge during the medals ceremony at the 1936 Olympics in Garmisch-Partenkirchen.

Henie placed eighth in a field of eight at the 1924 Winter Olympics, at the age of eleven. Henie won the first of an unprecedented ten consecutive World Figure Skating Championships in 1927 at the age of fourteen. The results of 1927 World Championships, where Henie won in 3–2 decision (or 7 vs. 8 ordinal points) over the defending Olympic and World Champion Herma Szabo of Austria, was "controversial", as three of the five judges that gave Henie first-place ordinals were Norwegian (1 + 1 + 1 + 2 + 2 = 7 points) while Szabo received first-place ordinals from an Austrian and a German judge (1 + 1 + 2 + 2 + 2 = 8 points). Henie went on to win the first of her three Olympic gold medals the following year, becoming one of the youngest figure skating Olympic champions. She defended her Olympic titles in 1932 and in 1936, and her world titles annually until 1936. Henie and Gillis Grafström from Sweden are the only skaters to win three Olympic gold medals in single skating. She also won six consecutive European championships from 1931 to 1936.

Henie's unprecedented three Olympic gold medals have not been matched by any ladies' singles skater since, nor have her achievements as ten-time consecutive World champion. While Irina Slutskaya of Russia has held the record for most European titles among ladies' skaters since 2006, Henie still retains the record of most consecutive titles, sharing it with Katarina Witt of East Germany/Germany (1983–1988).

Towards the end of her career, she began to be strongly challenged by younger skaters including Cecilia Colledge, Megan Taylor, and Hedy Stenuf. However, she held off these competitors and went on to win her third Olympic title at the 1936 Winter Olympics, albeit in very controversial circumstances with Cecilia Colledge finishing a very close second. Indeed, after the school figures section at the 1936 Olympic competition, Colledge and Henie were virtually neck and neck with Colledge trailing by just a few points. As Sandra Stevenson recounted in The Independent, "the closeness [of the competition] infuriated Henie, who, when the result for that section was posted on a wall in the competitors' lounge, swiped the piece of paper and tore it into little pieces.

The draw for the free skating [then] came under suspicion after Henie landed the plum position of skating last, while Colledge had to perform second of the 26 competitors. The early start was seen as a disadvantage, with the audience not yet whipped into a clapping frenzy and the judges known to become freer with their higher marks as the event proceeded. Years later, a fairer, staggered draw was adopted to counteract this situation".

During her competitive career, Henie traveled widely and worked with a variety of foreign coaches. At home in Oslo, she trained at Frogner Stadium, where her coaches included Hjørdis Olsen and Oscar Holte. During the latter part of her competitive career she was coached primarily by the American Howard Nicholson in London.

In addition to traveling to train and compete, she was much in demand as a performer at figure skating exhibitions in both Europe and North America. Henie became so popular with the public that police had to be called out for crowd control on her appearances in various disparate cities such as Prague and New York City.

It was an open secret that, in spite of the strict amateurism requirements of the time, Wilhelm Henie demanded "expense money" for his daughter's skating appearances. Both of Henie's parents had given up their own pursuits in Norway—leaving Leif to run the fur business—in order to accompany Sonja on her travels and act as her managers.

=== Professional and film career ===
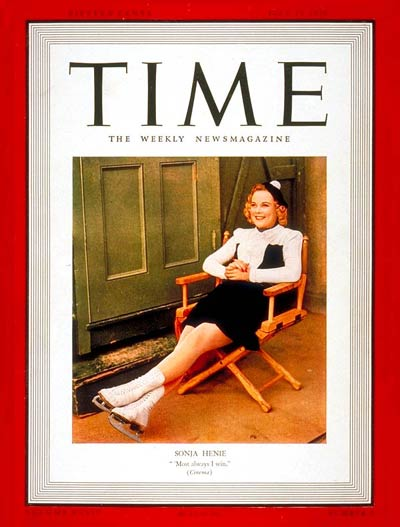
Sonja Henie appeared on the cover of Time magazine on 17 July 1939

After the 1936 World Figure Skating Championships, Henie gave up her amateur status and took up a career as a professional performer in acting and live shows. While still a girl, Henie had decided that she wanted to move to California and become a movie star when her competitive days were over, without considering that her strong accent might hinder her acting ambitions.

Henie opened up opportunities for figure skaters to use their skills to earn a living. In addition to appearing in Hollywood films, she toured North America with her own professional shows, thus amassing a great deal of personal wealth and by popularizing the ice show, opened up professional skating opportunities for other lesser-known figure skaters.

In 1936, following a successful ice show in Los Angeles orchestrated by her father to launch her film career, Hollywood studio chief Darryl Zanuck signed her to a long-term contract at Twentieth Century Fox, which made her one of the highest-paid actresses of the time. After the success of her first film, One in a Million (1936), Henie's position was assured and she became increasingly demanding in her business dealings with Zanuck. Henie also insisted on having total control of the skating numbers in her films such as Second Fiddle (1939).

Henie tried to break the musical comedy mould with the anti-Nazi film Everything Happens at Night (1939) and It's a Pleasure (1945), a skating variation of the often-told A Star Is Born tale about alcoholic-star-in-decline-helps-newcomer-up. It was her only film shot in Technicolor, but it was not as huge at the box office as her other films and also proved her limitations as a dramatic actress in her only dramatic film.

When Zanuck realized this, he cast her in more musical comedies: Sun Valley Serenade (1941) with Glenn Miller, John Payne, The Nicholas Brothers, and hit songs such as "In the Mood", "Chattanooga Choo Choo", "It Happened in Sun Valley", and "I Know Why (And So Do You)"; followed by Iceland (1942) with Jack Oakie, Payne, and the hit song "There Will Never Be Another You"; and finally Wintertime (1943) with Cesar Romero, Carole Landis, Cornel Wilde, and Oakie. Sonja had by now developed a comedy flair and these films were all among the top box-office hits for 20th Century-Fox the respective years. Adjusted for 2017 dollars, eight Henie movies crossed the $100 million domestic gross mark. Happy Landing (1938) was her biggest box office hit.

In her film Everything Happens at Night (1939), Ray Milland and Robert Cummings star as rival reporters hot on the trail of Hugo Norden (Maurice Moscovich). Norden, a Nobel Prize winner, was supposedly murdered by the Gestapo, but is rumoured to be in hiding and writing anonymous dispatches advocating world peace. When Geoffrey and Ken track Norden to a small village in the Swiss Alps, they soon find themselves competing over the affections of beautiful Louise (Henie), who has a deeper connection to the missing Nobel laureate than the reporters realize. When Geoffrey and Ken get so distracted by romance that they begin to neglect their assignments, it almost leads to disaster as the Gestapo sets out to silence Norden once and for all. Released on 22 December 1939, it was banned in Nazi Germany.

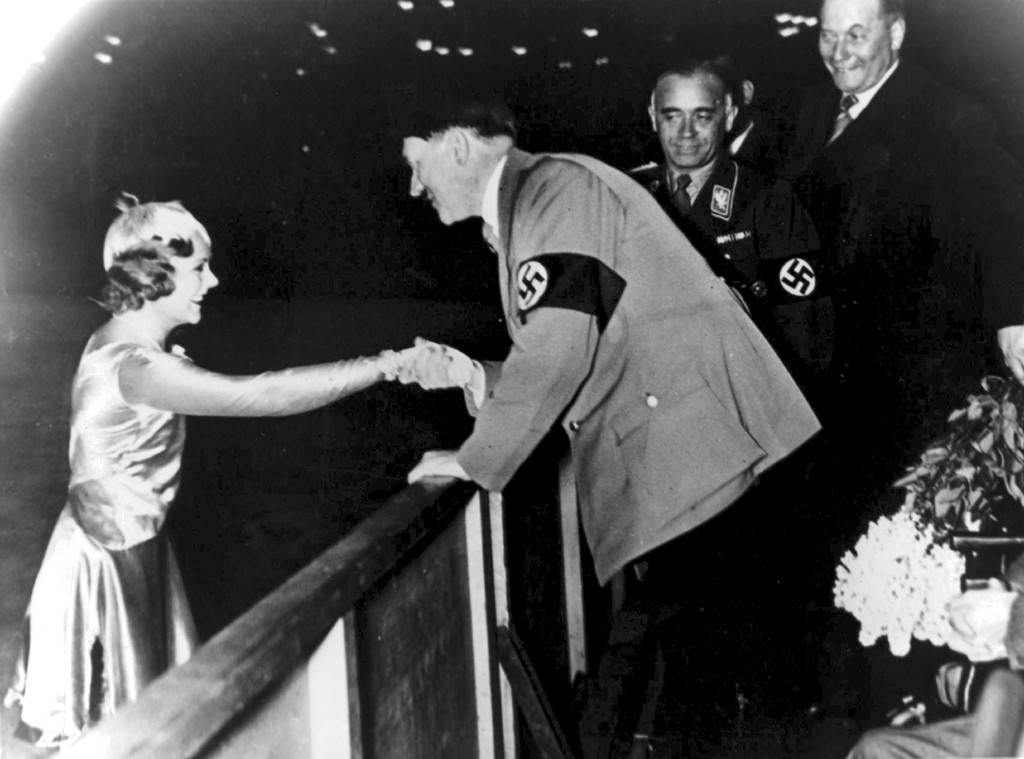
Henie with Hitler in 1936

In addition to her film career at Fox from 1936 to 1943, Henie formed a business arrangement with Arthur Wirtz, who produced her touring ice shows under the name of "Hollywood Ice Revue". Wirtz also acted as Henie's financial advisor. At the time, figure skating and ice shows were not yet an established form of entertainment in the United States. Henie's popularity as a film actress attracted many new fans and instituted skating shows as a popular new entertainment. Throughout the 1940s, Henie and Wirtz produced lavish musical ice skating extravaganzas at Rockefeller Center's Center Theatre attracting millions of ticket buyers.

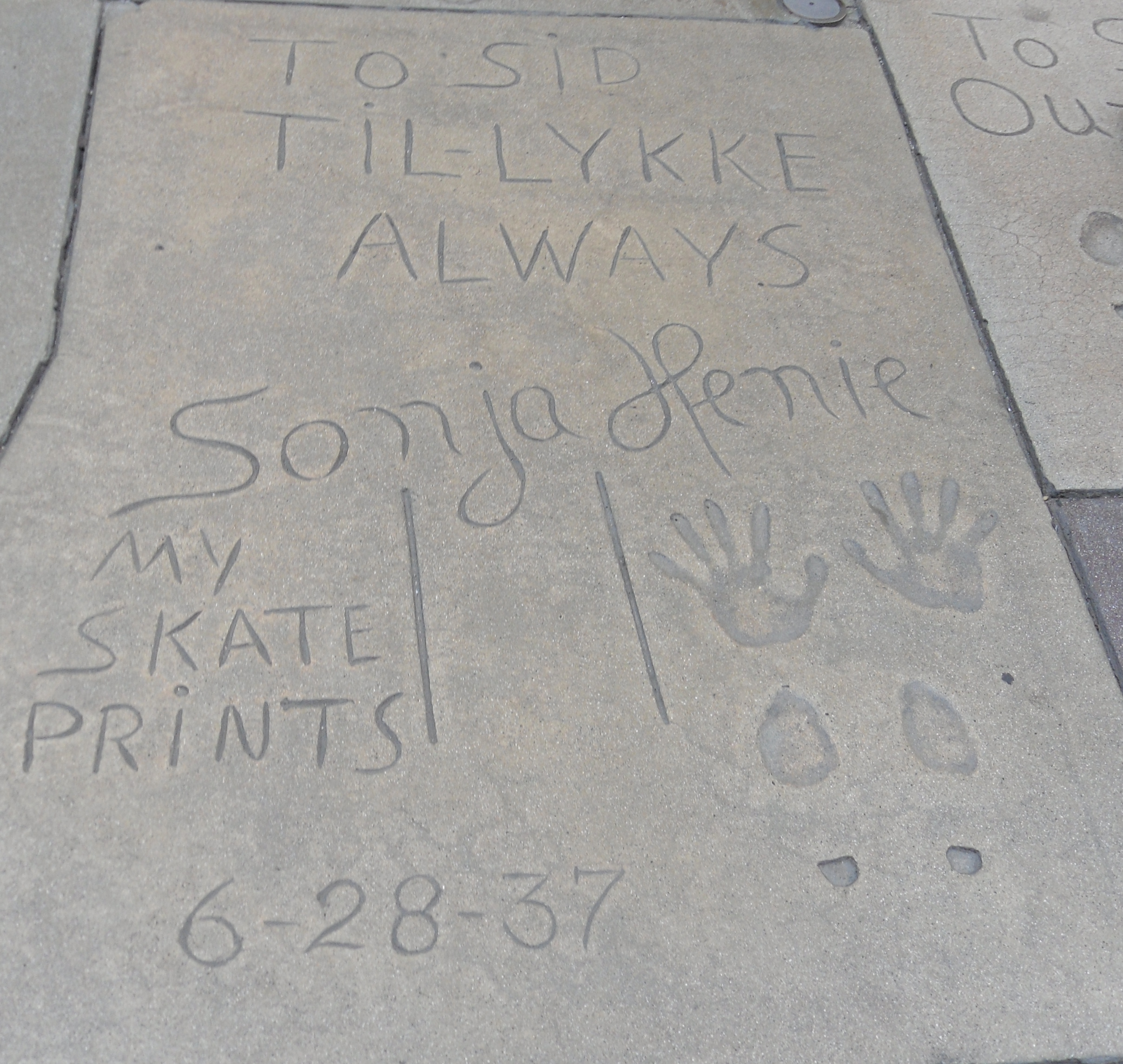
Henie's handprint/signature in front of Grauman's Chinese Theatre

Henie broke off her arrangement with Wirtz in 1950 and for the next three seasons produced her own tours under the name "Sonja Henie Ice Revue". It was an ill-advised decision to set herself up in competition with Wirtz, whose shows now featured the new Olympic champion Barbara Ann Scott. Since Wirtz controlled the best arenas and dates, Henie was left playing smaller venues and markets already saturated by other touring ice shows such as Ice Capades. The collapse of a section of bleachers during a show in Baltimore, Maryland, in 1952 compounded the tour's legal and financial woes.

In 1953, Henie formed a new partnership with Morris Chalfen to appear in his European Holiday On Ice tour, which proved to be a great success. She produced her own show at New York's Roxy Theatre in January 1956. However, a subsequent South American tour in 1956 was a disaster. Henie was drinking heavily at that time and could no longer keep up with the demands of touring, and this marked her retirement from skating.

She did try to make a film series at her own expense; a series that would serve as a travelogue to several cities. Paris and London were mentioned, but only Hello London (1958) was made with her own backing, co-starring Michael Wilding and special guest star Stanley Holloway. While her ice show numbers were still worth watching, the film received few distributors and poor reviews, ending her film career.

Her autobiography Mitt livs eventyr was published in 1938. An English translation, Wings on My Feet, was released in 1940 and republished in a revised edition in 1954. At the time of her death, the 57-year-old Henie was planning a comeback for a television special that would have aired in January 1970. She was to have danced to "Lara's Theme" from Doctor Zhivago.

=== As international celebrity ===
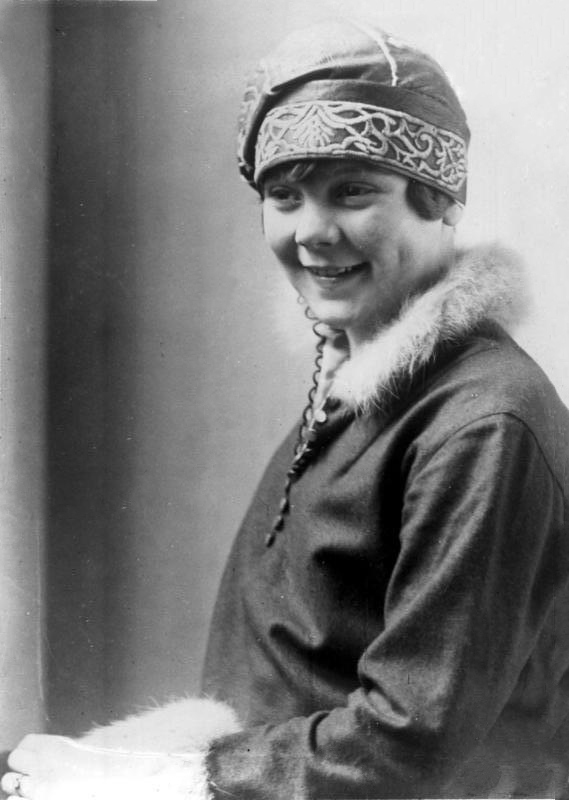
Henie in Berlin, 1930

Henie's connections with Adolf Hitler and other high-ranking Nazi officials made her the subject of controversy before, during, and after World War II. During her amateur skating career, she performed often in Germany and was a favorite of German audiences and of Hitler personally. As a wealthy celebrity, she moved in the same social circles as royalty and heads of state and made Hitler's acquaintance as a matter of course.

Through the years, her shows and later art exhibitions drew the attention of such people as Princess Margaret, Countess of Snowdon and Gustaf VI Adolf of Sweden and she met with them. During the shooting of Second Fiddle (1939), she greeted the then Crown-Prince couple of Norway Olav and Märtha during their US tour.

Controversy appeared first when Henie greeted Hitler with a Nazi salute at the 1936 Winter Olympics in Garmisch-Partenkirchen and after the Games she accepted an invitation to lunch with Hitler at his resort home in Berchtesgaden in far southeastern Bavaria, where Hitler presented Henie with an autographed photo with a lengthy inscription. She was strongly denounced in the Norwegian press for this.

In her revised 1954 biography, she states that no Norwegian judge was in the panel for the 1936 Olympics—as she was entitled to as a Norwegian. She therefore made the best of it and won her third Olympic medal. When she—as a gold medal winner—passed Hitler's tribune with silver medalist Cecilia Colledge and bronze medalist Vivi-Anne Hultén, neither she nor the others honored Hitler with the Nazi salute. The 1936 European Figure Skating Championships also took place in Berlin and neither Henie, Colledge, nor Megan Taylor paid obeisance to Hitler.

=== Influence ===
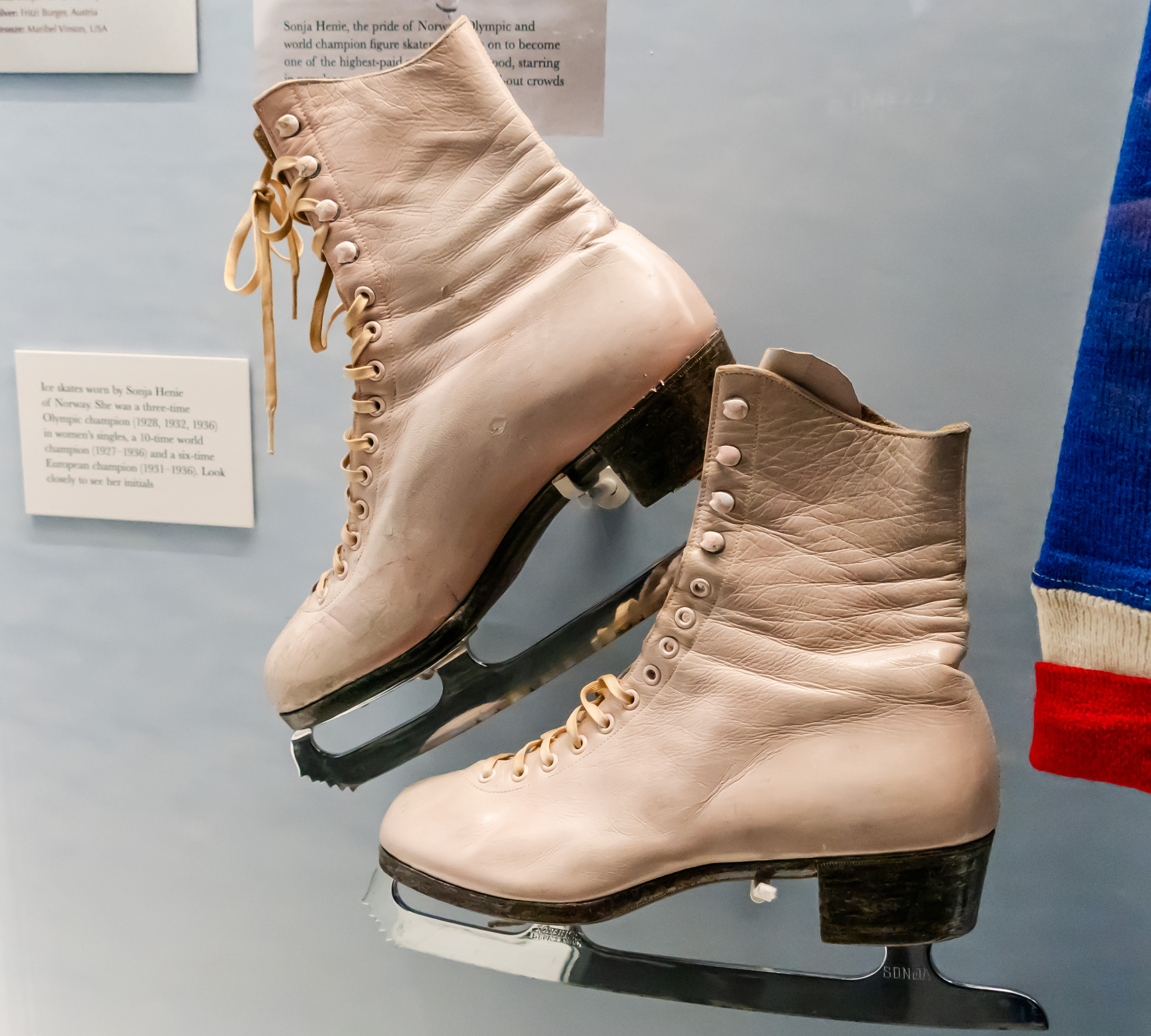
A pair of Henie's skates on display at the Lake Placid Winter Olympic Museum

Henie is credited with being the first figure skater to use dance choreography, to adopt the short skirt in figure skating, and to wear white boots, which deemphasized the heaviness of skates and produced a lighter and longer appearance of the skater's legs that was "a focal point for judges' and spectators' gaze". When white boots quickly became standard for female skaters, Henie began wearing beige boots because she wanted to remain unique.

Her innovative skating techniques and glamorous demeanor transformed the sport permanently and confirmed its acceptance as a legitimate sport in the Winter Olympics. Figure skating writer and historian Ellyn Kestnbaum credits Henie with transforming figure skating into what she calls "a spectacle of the skater's body" and for "shifting [the sport's] meanings firmly in the direction of femininity". Kestnbaum argues that Henie influenced female skaters' costumes that emphasized their wealth, especially her fur-trimmed outfits, which were emulated at the 1930 World Championships, held for the first time in North America, in New York City. Henie incorporated dance elements into her figure skating, through the placement of spins, jumps, and choreography to reflect the mood of the music she used.

Kestnbaum argues that although Henie's skating was "athletic and powerful for her day", she added elements,such as using the toepicks of her skates to run or pose on the ice, in movements similar to the use of pointe technique in ballet. Kestnbaum argues that although toe steps are used as "occasional counterpoints to the legato flow of skating movement", Henie might have overused them, calling them "mincing and ineffective".

Also according to Kestnbaum, "Henie's largest contribution to public images of skating" was in her professional ice shows and in her Hollywood films, which were often the first time audiences were exposed to figure skating through the mass media. As a result, the image of the figure skater was linked to "the image of the glamorous movie star", within the conventions of film and stage musicals of the 1930s. Kestnbaum argues that the costumes Henie wore in her shows and films, which were short, revealing, full of sequins and feathers, and more reminiscent of the costumes of female entertainers than of the clothes worn in the more conservative world of competitive figure skating of the time, most likely contributed to the "showiness" that influenced the costume choices of later generations of female competitive figure skaters.

=== Personal life ===
External image
- Sonja Henie with her art collection in Los Angeles, 1964. Her collection is now held by the Henie Onstad Art Centre.

Henie was married three times: to Dan Topping (1940–1946), Winthrop Gardiner Jr. (1949–1956), and Niels Onstad (1956–1969; her death), a Norwegian shipping magnate and art patron. After her retirement in 1956, Henie and Onstad settled in Oslo and accumulated a large collection of modern art that formed the basis for the Henie Onstad Art Centre at Høvikodden in Bærum near Oslo.

She studied in Oslo together with Martin Stixrud and Erna Andersen who was her competitor and skate club member.

Henie was diagnosed with chronic lymphocytic leukemia in the mid-1960s. She died of the disease at age 57 in 1969 in an ambulance plane flight from Paris to Oslo. She is buried with Onstad in Oslo on the hilltop overlooking the Henie Onstad Art Centre.

== Results ==
=== Ladies' singles ===
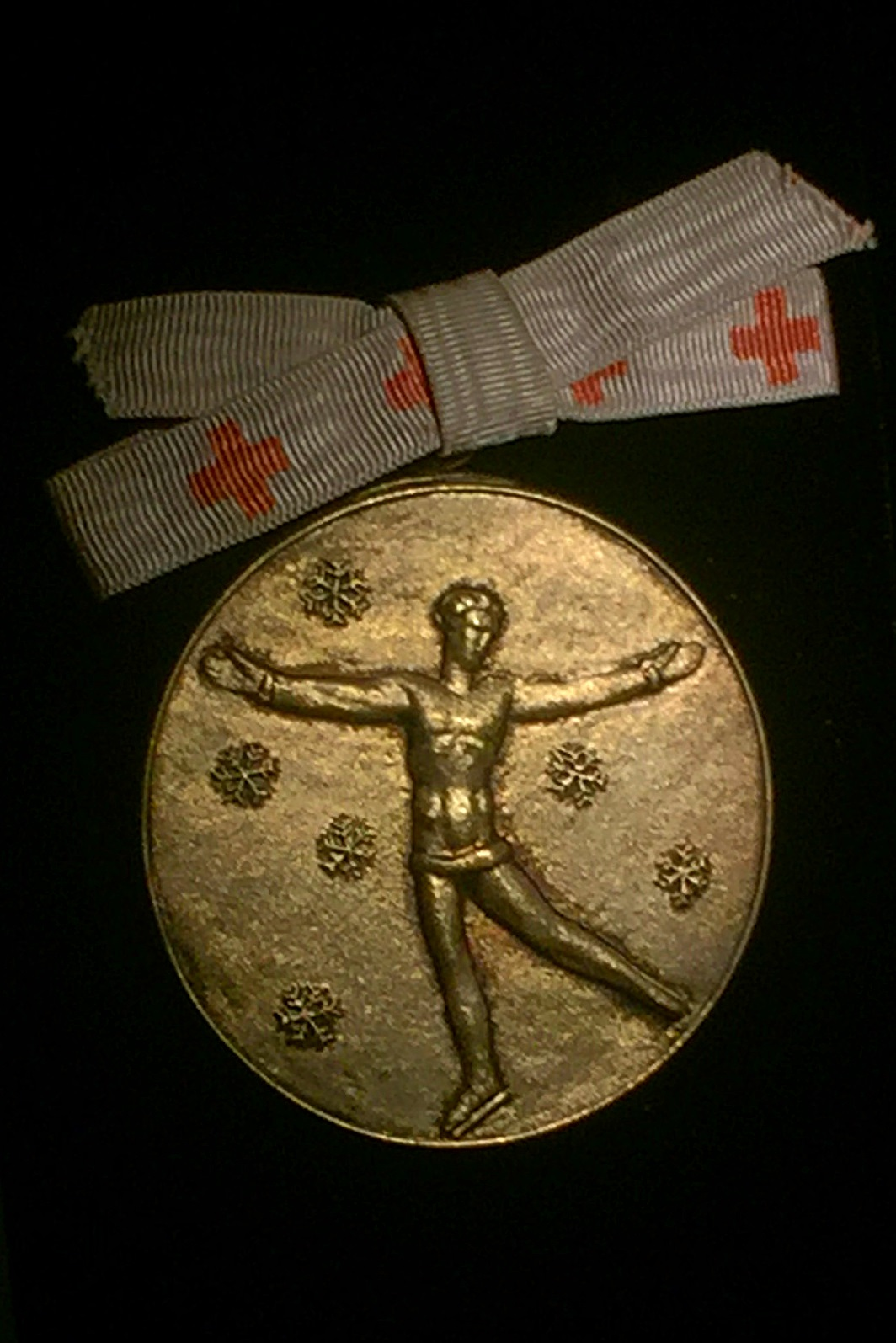
Henie's Olympic gold medal, St. Moritz 1928

| Event | 1923 | 1924 | 1925 | 1926 | 1927 | 1928 | 1929 | 1930 | 1931 | 1932 | 1933 | 1934 | 1935 | 1936 |
|---|---|---|---|---|---|---|---|---|---|---|---|---|---|---|
| Winter Olympics | | 8th | | | | 1st | | | | 1st | | | | 1st |
| World Championships | | 5th | | 2nd | 1st | 1st | 1st | 1st | 1st | 1st | 1st | 1st | 1st | 1st |
| European Championships | | | | | | | | | 1st | 1st | 1st | 1st | 1st | 1st |
| Norwegian Championships | 1st | 1st | 1st | 1st | 1st | 1st | 1st | | | | | | | |

=== Pairs ===
(with Arne Lie)

| Event | 1926 | 1927 | 1928 |
|---|---|---|---|
| World Championships | 5th | | |
| Norwegian Championships | 1st | 1st | 1st |

== Awards ==
- Inducted into the World Figure Skating Hall of Fame (1976)
- Inducted into the International Women's Sports Hall of Fame (1982)
- She has a star on the Hollywood Walk of Fame.
- In 1938, at age 25, she became the youngest person to be made a knight first class of The Royal Norwegian Order of St. Olav.
- Honorary Colonel and Godmother of the 508th Parachute Infantry Regiment, 82nd Airborne Division, Fort Bragg, North Carolina

== Filmography ==
| Year | Title | Role |
|---|---|---|
| 1927 | Seven Days for Elizabeth | Skater |
| 1929 | Se Norge | Herself |
| 1936 | One in a Million | Greta "Gretchen" Muller |
| 1937 | Thin Ice | Lili Heiser |
| 1937 | Ali Baba Goes to Town | Herself |
| 1938 | Happy Landing | Trudy Ericksen |
| 1938 | My Lucky Star | Krista Nielsen |
| 1939 | Second Fiddle | Trudi Hovland |
| 1939 | Everything Happens at Night | Louise |
| 1941 | Sun Valley Serenade | Karen Benson |
| 1942 | Iceland | Katina Jonsdottir |
| 1943 | Wintertime | Nora |
| 1945 | It's a Pleasure | Chris Linden |
| 1948 | The Countess of Monte Cristo | Karen Kirsten |
| 1960 | Hello London | Herself |
| 1971 | I Miss Sonia Henie | Herself |

== Other appearances ==
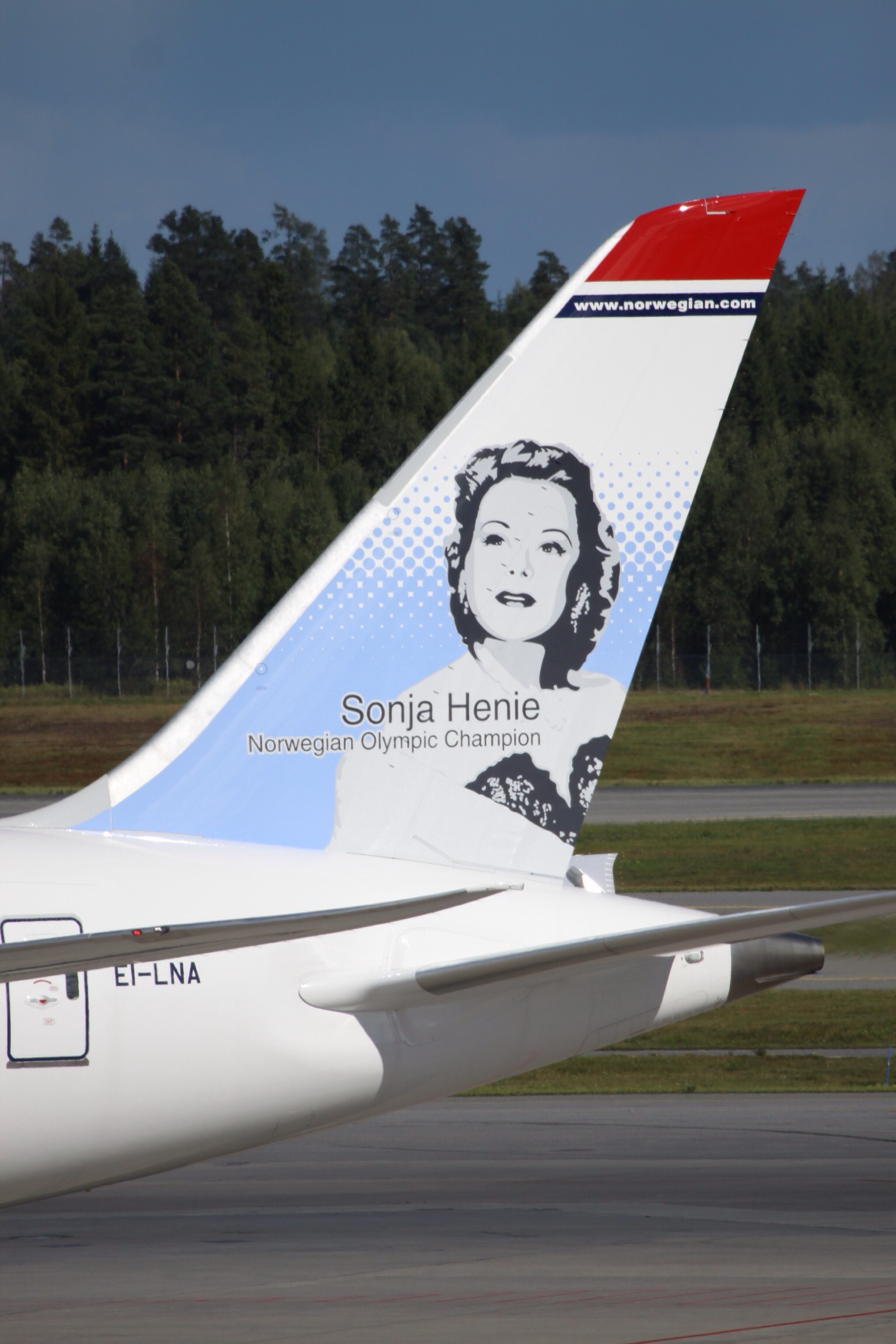
Henie’s image on a Norwegian Air Shuttle Boeing 787

- For a time, Sonja Henie's picture adorned the tail of a Boeing 737-300 of the airline Norwegian Air Shuttle. As the Boeing 737-300 was being phased out, her picture was placed on the tail of a Boeing 737-800 of the same airline and in 2013 to the tail of Norwegian Air Shuttle's first Boeing 787 Dreamliner. One of the airline's trademarks is having portraits of famous deceased Norwegians on the tails of its aircraft.
- In 2012, the Posten Norge (Norwegian postal service) issued two stamps featuring Sonja Henie.
- Footage of her skating is shown in Yugoslav Black Wave film I Miss Sonja Henie (1971).

== In popular culture ==
Henie was portrayed by Ine Marie Wilmann in the 2018 Anne Sewitsky film Sonja – The White Swan, shown at the 2019 Sundance Film Festival.

Her name and likeness were mentioned and portrayed by an ice skating Donald Duck in Walt Disney's 1939 The Hockey Champ.

Her name and appearance was shown in episode 285 of MASH 4077.

Her animated counterpart appeared in the Disney short, The Autograph Hound when Donald asked for her autograph.

She is mentioned by Ty Webb, Chevy Chase's character in Caddyshack, as a possible but unavailable substitute for Rodney Dangerfield's character (Al Czervik) in the final “golf wager” round before Michael O’Keefe's Danny Noonan is chosen.

"Sonja Henie's tutu!" was a frequent exclamatory utterance by Tom and Ray Magliozzi on the National Public Radio show Car Talk.

== Works ==
- Henie, Sonja (1955). Wings on My Feet (revised ed.). New York: Prentice-Hall. OCLC 952642135.

== Works cited ==
- Andersen, Alf G. Som i en drøm: Sonja Henies liv. Schibsted (1985) ISBN 82-516-1041-9
- Henie, Leif and Raymond Strait. Queen of Ice, Queen of Shadows: The Unsuspected Life of Sonja Henie.
- Hines, James R. (2011). Historical Dictionary of Figure Skating. Lanham, Maryland: Scarecrow Press. ISBN 978-0-8108-6859-5.
- Kestnbaum, Ellyn (2003). Culture on Ice: Figure Skating and Cultural Meaning. Middleton, Connecticut: Wesleyan Publishing Press. ISBN 0-8195-6641-1.
- Variety (January 1943)
- Variety (January 1944)
