= Tadeusz Kowalski =

Polish military officer and sportsman

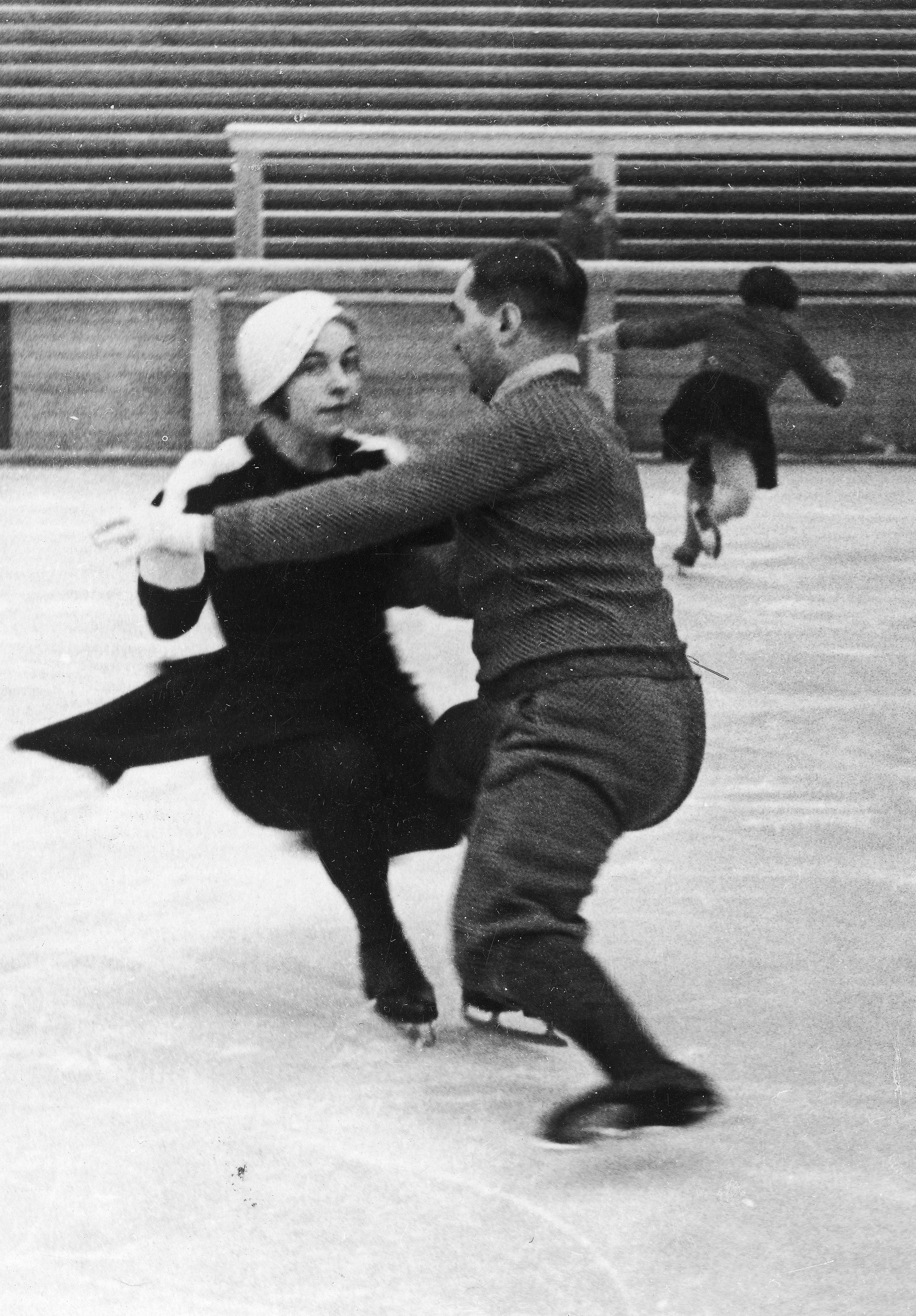
- Zofia Bilorówna and Tadeusz Kowalski pair skating in 1934.

Personal information
- Born: 31 May 1894 Lviv, Austro-Hungary
- Died: 1940 (aged 45–46) Kharkiv, USSR

Figure skating career
- Country: Poland
- Partner: Zofia Bilorówna
- Retired: 1935

Medal record
European Championships
Bronze medal – third place	1934 Prague	Pairs
Polish Championships
Gold medal – first place	1927 Warsaw	Pairs
Gold medal – first place	1928 Lviv	Pairs
Gold medal – first place	1929 Lviv	Pairs
Gold medal – first place	1930 Lviv	Pairs
Gold medal – first place	1931 Katowice	Pairs
Gold medal – first place	1932 Zakopane	Pairs
Gold medal – first place	1933 Cieszyn	Pairs
Gold medal – first place	1934 Warsaw	Pairs
Gold medal – first place	1935 Katowice	Pairs
Silver medal – second place	1923 Lviv	Pairs

Tadeusz Kowalski (31 May 1894 – spring 1940) was a Polish military officer and sportsman.

== Biography ==
Kowalski was a competitive pair skater with partner Zofia Bilorówna. They were nine-time (1927–1935) Polish national champions. They won the bronze medal at the 1934 European Figure Skating Championships. Their highest placement at the World Figure Skating Championships was 4th, which they accomplished in 1934.

Kowalski was also a footballer. Between 1912 and 1928, he played for the Czarni Lwow team. He was unsuccessfully trialled for entry into the Poland national football team which was projected to appear in the 1920 Summer Olympics but its attendance cancelled due to the outbreak of the Polish-Bolshevik War.

He was an officer of the Polish Army, lieutenant of artillery, who served in both the Polish-Bolshevik War and the Defensive War of 1939 at start of World War II when he was captured by the Soviet Union. He was killed at Kharkov during the Katyn massacre, aged 45. In 2007, the Polish Minister of Defense posthumously awarded him the rank of major.

== Competitive highlights ==
Competition	1923	1927	1928	1929	1930	1931	1932	1933	1934	1935
World Championships									4th	5th
European Championships									3rd	
Polish Championships	2nd	1st	1st	1st	1st	1st	1st	1st	1st	1st
