= Erich Erdös =

Austrian figure skater

Figure skating career
- Country: Austria
Medal record
Representing Austria
Men's figure skating
World Championships
Bronze medal – third place	1934 Stockholm	Singles
European Championships
Bronze medal – third place	1932 Paris	Singles
Bronze medal – third place	1933 London	Singles

Erich Erdös was an Austrian figure skater who competed in men's singles.

He won the bronze medal in men's single skating at the 1934 World Figure Skating Championships.

== Competitive highlights ==
International
Event	1932	1933	1934	1935
World Championships		4th	3rd	7th
European Championships	3rd	3rd	5th	6th
National
Austrian Championships	3rd	2nd	2nd	2nd
