= Nanna Egedius =

Norwegian figure skater (1913–1986)

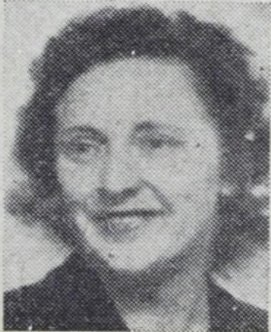
- Nanna Egedius in the book Sport i navn og bilder from 1950

Personal information
- Full name: Nanna Margrethe Egedius
- Born: 14 May 1913 Christiania
- Died: 21 April 1986 (aged 72) Oslo

Figure skating career
- Country: Norway
- Skating club: Oslo IL
- Retired: 1936

Nanna Egedius (14 May 1913 – 21 April 1986) was a Norwegian figure skater.

She competed at the 1931 World Figure Skating Championships, where she placed seventh. She also competed at the 1933, 1934 and 1935 World Figure Skating Championships, and she participated at the 1936 Winter Olympics. Egedius won the Norwegian Figure Skating Championships in 1932, 1933, 1934, 1935 and 1936.

== Results ==
Event	1931	1932	1933	1934	1935	1936
Winter Olympic Games						WD
World Championships	7th		7th	8th	7th	
European Championships				6th	10th	
Norwegian Championships		1st	1st	1st	1st	1st
