= Grete Lainer =

Austrian figure skater 1914–1991)

Margarethe "Grete" Lainer (20 June 1914 — 27 November 1991) was an Austrian figure skater who competed in ladies' singles. She finished ninth at the 1936 Winter Olympics.

== Results ==
International
| Event | 1933 | 1934 | 1935 | 1936 | 1937 |
|---|---|---|---|---|---|
| Winter Olympics | | | | 9th | |
| World Championships | | 6th | | | |
| European Championships | 8th | 5th | 6th | | |
National
| Austrian Championships | | 2nd | 2nd | 3rd | 2nd |
