= Grasshopper (disambiguation) =

A grasshopper is a common type of herbivorous insect.

Grasshopper or grasshoppers may also refer to:

== Companies ==
- Martins Bank, or the Grasshopper (1730–1760), a private bank in London
- Grasshopper Manufacture, a video game company
- The Grasshopper Company, an American manufacturer of lawn mowers and related implements

== Drinks ==
- Grasshopper (cocktail)
- Grasshöpper Wheat Ale, produced by Big Rock Brewery

== Films ==
- The Grasshopper (1955 film), a Soviet drama
- The Grasshopper (1970 film), a drama starring Jacqueline Bisset and Jim Brown
- Grasshoppers (Cavallette), a 1990 short animated film
- Grasshopper (film), a 2015 Japanese thriller starring Toma Ikuta, Tadanobu Asano and Ryosuke Yamada

== Literature ==
- Grasshopper (character), several characters in Marvel Comics
- Grasshopper (novel), by Barbara Vine (Ruth Rendell)
- "The Grasshopper" (short story), 1892, by Anton Chekhov

== Military ==
- HMS Grasshopper, eight vessels and one shore station of the Royal Navy
- Grasshopper (robot weather station), developed by the US Air Force and Navy in the 1950s and deployed by parachute
- Grasshopper cannon, a British infantry weapon designed in the 18th century
- Slingsby Grasshopper, a British Royal Air Force training glider
- Taylorcraft L-2 or Grasshopper, an American military aircraft
- Aeronca L-3 or Grasshopper, an American military aircraft
- Piper L-4 or Grasshopper, a military version of the Piper J-3 Cub
- Stinson L-13 or Grasshopper, an American military aircraft

== Music ==
- Grasshopper (band), a Cantopop group from Hong Kong
- Grasshopper (musician) (born 1967), American, with the band Mercury Rev
- Grasshopper (album), by J. J. Cale
- Grasshopper (EP), by British band Ride
- "The Grasshoppers" (song), by the South Korean group Sunny Hill
- "Grasshopper", a song from the album Grasshopper by J. J. Cale
- "Grasshopper", a song from the album Going Blank Again by Ride

== Places ==
- Grasshopper, Arizona, a populated place
- Grasshopper Township, Atchison County, Kansas
- Delaware River (Kansas), or Grasshopper River
- Grasshopper Glacier (Montana)
- Grasshopper Glacier (Wyoming)
- Grasshopper Peak, a mountain in Washington state

== Sports ==
- The Grasshopper (horse) (foaled c. 1945), a competitor in the sport of eventing
- Grasshopper Club Zürich, a Swiss association football club
  - Grasshopper Club Zürich (women), the women's team
- Grasshoppers F.C., a defunct association football club from Bonnybridge, Scotland
- Greensboro Grasshoppers, a minor league baseball team in North Carolina, United States
- Preston Grasshoppers R.F.C., a rugby union team from Preston, England
- Grasshopper Women's Masters, a women's World Curling Tour event

== Vehicles ==
- Ikarus Grasshopper, a German hang glider design
- Sopwith Grasshopper, a British two-seat touring biplane
- XO-63 Grasshopper and L6A Grasshopper, variants of the Interstate Cadet light aircraft
- Atlantic (locomotive), nicknamed Grasshopper
- SpaceX Grasshopper, a Falcon 9 vertical landing rocket prototype, circa 2012
- Amur Grasshopper, a Roscosmos vertical landing rocket prototype, circa 2025

== Other uses ==
- The Grasshopper (painting), an 1872 painting by Jules Joseph Lefebvre
- Grasshopper (chess), a fairy chess piece
- Grasshopper (mobile app), an app developed by Google that teaches coding
- Grasshopper (sculpture), 1988, by Wayne Chabre in Salem, Oregon, United States
- Operation Grasshopper, a project to look for natural resources in Suriname from the air
- Grasshopper beam engine, a variant where the beam is pivoted at one end, rather than in the centre
- Grasshopper escapement, a mechanical component of a clock
- Grasshopper 3D, a visual programming language that runs within the Rhinoceros 3D CAD application
- Grasshopper Scouts, a Hong Kong scouting organization for 6- to 8-year-old children
- Grasshopper, a nickname for Kwai Chang Caine, protagonist of the TV series Kung Fu

== See also ==
- Grasshopper chess, a chess variant
- Heuschrecke 10 (English: Grasshopper 10), a German World War II prototype self-propelled gun
- Jim Whitney (1857–1891), baseball pitcher nicknamed "Grasshopper Jim"
