= Hoppe =

Hoppe or Hoppé is a German surname that may refer to:

- Alex Hoppe (born 1998), American baseball player
- Alfred Hoppe (1830–1919), English cricketer
- Andreas Hoppe (1960–2026), German actor
- Anton Hoppe (1889–1968), German politician
- Art Hoppe (1925–2000), columnist for the San Francisco Chronicle
- Bettina Hoppe (born 21 May 1974), German actress.
- Carl Hoppe (1897–1981), painter
- David Heinrich Hoppe (1760–1846), German botanist
- Else Hoppe, Czech figure skater
- Emil Hoppe (1876–1957), Austrian architect
- Emil Otto Hoppé (1878–1972), German-born British portrait, landscape and travel photographer
- Erik Hoppe (1896–1968), Danish painter
- Felicitas Hoppe (born 1960), German writer
- Felix Hoppe-Seyler (1825–1895), German physiologist and chemist
- Gunnar Hoppe (1914–2005), Swedish Quaternary geologist and geographer
- Hans-Hermann Hoppe (born 1949), German-American economics professor
- Hans-Joachim Hoppe (born 1945), German expert on Russian and East European affairs
- Heinz Hoppe (1924–1993), German singer
- Jenny Hoppe (1870–1934), German-Belgian painter
- Johannes Hoppe (1907-?), German astronomer
  - 3499 Hoppe, a main-belt asteroid named after Johannes Hoppe
- Jörg-Dietrich Hoppe (1940–2011), German doctor
- Kelly Hoppe, Canadian musician
- Marianne Hoppe (1909–2002), German actress
- Matthew Hoppe (born 2001), American footballer
- Matthias Hoppe (born 1958), East German canoer
- Michael Hoppé, UK composer and recording artist
- Norberto Hoppe (1941–2019), Brazilian footballer
- Oscar Hoppe (1886–1936), figure skater
- Paul-Werner Hoppe (1910–1974), German SS-Obersturmbannführer (lieutenant colonel) and commandant of Stutthof concentration camp
- Reinhold Hoppe (1816–1900), German mathematician
- René Hoppe (born 1976), German bobsledder
- Rolf Hoppe (1930–2018), German film and stage actor
- Rudolf Hoppe (1922–2014), German chemist
- Sean Hoppe (born 1971), New Zealand rugby league player
- Torleif Hoppe (born 1965), co-creator and scriptwriter on Danish crime drama series The Killing and creator of 2019 series DNA
- Willie Hoppe (1887–1959), American professional carom billiards champion
- Walter Hoppe (1917–1986), German biophysicist and electron microscopist; pioneer in 3D reconstruction
- Wolfgang Hoppe (born 1957), East German bobsledder

== See also ==
- Hopper (disambiguation)
