= Hop =

A hop is a type of jump.

Hop or hops may also refer to:

== Arts and entertainment ==
- Hop (film), a 2011 film
  - Hop (soundtrack), soundtrack of the same name of the film
- Hop (mixtape), a 2024 mixtape by Stray Kids
- Hop! Channel, an Israeli television-channel
- hop, a gathering for the purpose of dancing
  - Record hop
  - Sock hop, an informal gathering which includes dancing
- House of Payne, or HOP, an American sitcom
- Lindy Hop, a swing dance of the 1920s and 1930s
- Hop Harrigan, a character in American comic books, radio serials and film serials from 1939 into the 1940s
- Hop, a character from Pokémon Sword and Shield

== People ==
- Hop Bartlett, American baseball pitcher in the Negro leagues in 1924 and 1925
- Hop Wilson (1921–1975), American Texas blues steel guitar player
- Ruth Mariann Hop (born 1974), Norwegian politician

== Places ==
- Hop River, Connecticut, United States
- Hop Creek, South Dakota, United States
- Hóp (Iceland), a lake
- Hóp, a Viking settlement in Vinland

== Plants ==
- Humulus lupulus, the hop plant
  - Hops, its flower, used to prepare beer and other food

== Science and medicine ==
- HOP (gene), encoding the homeodomain-only protein
- Hop (protein), the Hsp70-Hsp90 organizing protein
- Hubble Origins Probe, or HOP, a proposed orbital telescope

== Technology ==
- Hop (networking), a portion of a route
- Hop (software), a web broker and programming language
- Hop (telecommunications)
- Hindsight optimization, or Hop, an artificial intelligence technique
- High Octet Preset, or HOP, a C1 control character
- Spike (application), an email app formerly known as Hop

== Transport ==
- Air France Hop, a French airline
- HOP card, a smart card used on public transit in Auckland, New Zealand
- Hop Fastpass, a smart card used on public transit in Portland, Oregon, and Vancouver, Washington, United States
- Heritage Operations Processing System, a tool for management of historic railways
- Hope railway station (England), in England
- Hope station (Arkansas), in Arkansas, United States
- "The Hop", the brand for public transport in Sydney and New South Wales
- "The Hop (streetcar)", streetcar system in Milwaukee
- Hill Country Transit District, using the name HOP

== Other uses ==
- Hop (unit), a small Korean unit of volume
- Croatian Liberation Movement (Croatian: Hrvatski oslobodilački pokret)
- Heritage of Pride, or HOP, the organizer of the annual gay pride march in New York City
- Higher-Order Perl, a Perl programming book
- Helsingin Osakepankki (HOP), a former Finnish bank
- Hillsboro Hops, a minor league baseball team in the USA
- Slang for Opium, heroin, or other narcotic or psychoactive drugs

== See also ==
- Hopper (disambiguation)
- Hopping (disambiguation)
- Hopps
- Hip-hop
