= Hopper =

Hopper or hoppers may refer to:

== Mechanical parts ==
- Hopper, a storage container used to dispense granular materials through the use of a chute to restrict flow, sometimes assisted by mechanical agitation
  - Hopper (particulate collection container), a large container used for dust collection
  - A paintball loader
  - A manufacturing line hopper
  - Part of an agricultural aircraft to store the chemicals to be spread
  - Part of a combine harvester
  - Part of a wheel tractor-scraper to store the soil load
  - Feeder (livestock equipment)

== Places ==
- Hopper, Illinois
- Hopper, West Virginia
- Hopper, a mountain and valley in the Hunza–Nagar District of Pakistan
- Hopper (crater), on Mercury
- Mount Hopper, a mountain in Washington state, US

== Insects ==
- Hopper, the immature form of a locust
- Grasshopper
- Hoppers, butterflies of the genus Platylesches
- Leafhopper, a member of the family Cicadellidae
- Treehopper, a member of the family Membracidae (typical treehoppers) or Aetalionidae

== Transportation ==
- Hopper (spacecraft), a proposed spacecraft
- Hopper, a prototype test vehicle for the SpaceX Starship
- Hopper balloon, a kind of ultralight hot air balloon
- Hopper barge, a kind of barge
- Hopper car, a type of railway freight car
- Gravity wagon, or slant wagon, a type of wagon that is essentially a hopper; used in agriculture
- Space hopper, a toy: a ball with handles for bouncing on
- USS Hopper, a U.S. Navy destroyer

== Arts, entertainment, and media ==
=== Fictional entities ===
- Hopper, a fictional character and the main villain antagonist of the 1998 animated film A Bug's Life
- H.O.P.P.E.R.S. or Hoppers, the nickname of the fictional Huerta, California, from Jaime Hernandez's Locas graphic novels published in Love and Rockets
- Franz Hopper, a character in Code Lyoko
- Jim Hopper (Stranger Things), the police chief from the Netflix science-fiction horror series Stranger Things
- Hopper1, a Chemy in Kamen Rider Gotchard
- Hopper, a character in Tron: Uprising

=== Games ===
- Hoppers (game), a peg solitaire game released by Think Fun
- Hopper, multiple clones of the video game Frogger
- Hopper, a fairy chess piece

=== Music ===
- Hopper (band), English indie rock band
- The Hoppers, a Southern Gospel family ensemble

=== Other uses in arts, entertainment, and media ===
- Hoppers (film), a 2026 animated film from Disney and Pixar
- Dish Hopper (DVR), a service of Dish Network known for its AutoHop commercial-skipping feature

== Other uses ==
- Hopper (food) or Appam or Aappam hoppers, a type of food in Tamil Nadu, Kerala and Sri Lankan cuisine
- Hopper (microarchitecture), codename for a microarchitecture developed by Nvidia
- Hopper (surname)
- Hopper, one who harvests hops
- Hopper, a Lindy Hop dancer
- Hopper, an urban entry-level drug dealer or drug dealer's aide—typically a minor
- Bill hopper (furniture), a wooden box on the desk of the Clerk of the US House of Representatives in which bills or resolutions to be voted on are deposited
- Hopper crystal, a type of crystal formation shaped like a hopper wagon
- Hopper (company), a travel booking app and online travel marketplace that sells flights, hotels, rental cars, and short-term rentals

== See also ==
- Hop (disambiguation)
- Grasshopper (disambiguation)
