= Hopping =

Hopping may refer to:

== Activities ==
- Hopping, the act of jumping with one foot
- Freighthopping, the act of surreptitiously riding on a railroad freight car
- Movie hopping, using a single ticket for a movie theater to see more than one movie

== People ==
- Blair Hopping (born 1980), New Zealand sportsman
- Enos D. Hopping (1805–1847), United States Army general of the Mexican–American War
- Ralph Hopping (1868-1941), American entomologist

== Other uses ==
- USS Hopping (DE-155/APD-51), an American warship
- The Hoppings, a travelling fun fair held on the Town Moor, Newcastle upon Tyne
- Hopping, the use of hops in brewing beer
- Hopping, also known as Yogic flying

== See also ==
- Hopping Mappy, an arcade game
- Devil Hopping, an album by British band Inspiral Carpets
- Hopping Hill, an area in Milford, Derbyshire, England
- Island hopping (disambiguation)
- Hop (disambiguation)
