= Hopp =

Hopp is a surname. Notable people with the surname include:

- Ceci Hopp (born c. 1963), American track and field athlete
- Dietmar Hopp (born 1940), German entrepreneur
- Doris Hopp (1930–1998), Swedish brothel madam
- Gerhard Hopp (born 1981), German politician
- Hanns Hopp (1890–1971), German architect
- John W. Hopp (1868–1931), American politician
- Johnny Hopp (1916–2003), American baseball player
- Karl-Heinz Hopp (1936–2007), German rower
- Kristof Hopp (born 1978), German badminton player
- Lisa Hopp (born 1956), American academic
- Max Hopp (born 1996), German darts player
- Odd Hopp (1913-2001), Norwegian Scout leader
- Zinken Hopp (1905–1987), Norwegian writer

== See also ==
- Hoppe (disambiguation)
- Hopps (surname)
