= Hopps =

Hopps is a surname. Notable people with the surname include:

- Frank Hopps (1894–1976), British military aviator
- Harry Ryle Hopps (1869–1937), US businessman and artist
- Jimmy Hopps (born 1939), US jazz drummer
- John Hopps (physicist) (1939-2004), US physicist and politician
- John Alexander Hopps (1919–1998), Canadian biomedical engineer
- Walter Hopps (1932–2005), US museum director and curator

== Fictional characters ==
- Judy Hopps, the primary protagonist of the animated film Zootopia. Of note is that, as a rabbit, the name more or less serves as a pun.

== See also ==
- Hopp
- Hops
- Hop (disambiguation)
- Hoppe (disambiguation)
