= Hindsight (disambiguation) =

Hindsight bias is the inclination to see past events as being predictable and reasonable.

Hindsight may also refer to:

== Film and television ==
- Hindsight (2008 film), an American thriller film
- Hindsight (2011 film), a South Korean action drama film
- Hindsight (TV series), a 2015 VH1 series
- "Hindsight", an episode of the ninth season of ER
- "Hindsight", a season 16 episode of Law & Order

== Literature ==
- Hindsight (book), a 2018 memoir by Justin Timberlake
- Hindsight (character), a fictional character from the Marvel Comics universe
- "Hindsight", a 1940 science fiction story by Jack Williamson
- Hindsight, a 1983 novel by Peter Dickinson

== Music ==
- Hindsight Record Company, a record company based on original recordings from the Big Band era by Wally Heider
- Hindsight (Ken McIntyre album), 1974
- Hindsight (John Reuben album), 2002
- Hindsight (Anathema album), 2008
- Hindsight (Emmure album), 2020
- "Hindsight", a song by Death Cab for Cutie from their 1997 album You Can Play These Songs with Chords
- "Hindsight", a song by Pillar from their 2002 album Fireproof
- "Hindsight", a song by The Long Winters from the 2006 album Putting the Days to Bed
- "Hindsight", a song by Until June from the 2008 album Until June
- "Hindsight", a song by Built to Spill from their 2009 album There Is No Enemy

== Other ==
- Captain Hindsight, a fictional character in South Park
- Hindsight (video game), a 2022 adventure video game
- Retrocognition, the psychic ability to see into the past
- Project Hindsight, a 1960s US Defense Department study into the utility of research

== See also ==
- Hindsight optimization
- Hindsight 20/20 (album), an album by The Arrogant Worms
- Hindsight 21/20: Anthology 1975–1995, an album by Guy Clark
- Hinesight, a 2004 album by Marcia Hines
