= Inbox by Gmail =

Email service developed by Google

- Inbox by Gmail running on Android Lollipop
- Developer: Google LLC
- Release: October 22, 2014; 12 years ago (invitation-only); May 28, 2015; 11 years ago (public)

Final release(s) [±]
- Android: 1.78.217178463 / October 16, 2018; 8 years ago
- iOS: 1.3.181119 / December 11, 2018; 7 years ago
- Operating system: Android, iOS
- Successor: Gmail
- Type: Email client
- License: Freeware
- Website: inbox.google.com (wound down in 2019)

Inbox by Gmail was an email service developed by Google. Announced on a limited invitation-only basis on October 22, 2014, it was officially released to the public on May 28, 2015. Inbox was shut down by Google on April 2, 2019.

Available on the web, and through mobile apps for Android and iOS, Inbox by Gmail aimed to improve email productivity and organization through several key features. Bundles gathered emails on the same topic together; highlighted surface key details from messages, reminders and assists; and a "snooze" functionality enabled users to control when specific information would appear. Updates to the service enabled an "undo send" feature; a "Smart Reply" feature that automatically generated short reply examples for certain emails; integration with Google Calendar for event organization, previews of newsletters; and a "Save to Inbox" feature that let users save links for later use.

Inbox by Gmail received generally positive reviews. At its launch, it was called "minimalist and lovely, full of layers and easy to navigate", with features deemed helpful in finding the right messages—one reviewer noted that the service felt "a lot like the future of email". However, it also received criticism, particularly for a low density of information, algorithms that needed tweaking, and because the service required users to "give up the control" of organizing their own email, meaning that "Anyone who already has a system for organizing their emails will likely find themselves fighting Google's system". Google noted in March 2016 that 10% of all replies on mobile originated from Inbox's Smart Reply feature.

Google announced it would discontinue Inbox by Gmail in March 2019, with many of its features integrated into Gmail proper.

== Features ==
Inbox by Gmail scanned the user's incoming Gmail messages for information. It gathered email messages related to the same overall topic into an organized bundle, with a title describing the bundle's content. For example, flight tickets, car rentals, and hotel reservations were grouped under "Travel", giving the user an easier overview of emails. Users could also group emails together manually, to "teach" the Inbox how the user worked. The service highlighted key details and important information in messages, such as flight itineraries, event information, photos and documents. Inbox could retrieve updated information from the Internet, including the real-time status of flights and package deliveries. Users could set reminders to bring up important messages later. When a user needed particular information, Inbox could assist the user by displaying the necessary details. Where Inbox highlights information was not needed immediately, users could "snooze" a message or reminder, with options to make the information reappear at a later time or specific location.

In June 2015, Google added an "Undo Send" feature to Inbox, giving the user 10 seconds to undo sending a message.

In November 2015, Google added "Smart Reply" functionality to the mobile apps. With Smart Reply, Inbox determined which emails could be answered with a short reply, generating three example responses from which the user could select one with a single tap. Smart Reply (initially available only on the Android and iOS mobile apps) was added to the Inbox website in March 2016, Google announcing that "10% of all your replies on mobile already use Smart Reply". By May 2017, Google said Smart Reply was driving about 12% of replies in inbox on mobile.

In April 2016, Google updated Inbox with three new features; Google Calendar event organization, newsletter previews, and a "Save to Inbox" functionality that let the user save links for later use, rather than having to email links to themselves.

In December 2017, Google introduced an "Unsubscribe" card that let users easily unsubscribe from mailing lists. The card appeared for email messages (from specific senders) that the user had not opened for a month.

A few popular Inbox by Gmail features were subsequently added to Gmail:

- "Snoozing" of emails
- Nudges: Gmail could move old messages back to the top of the inbox when it thought a follow up or reply might be required.
- Hover actions: Placing the mouse cursor over a certain part of the message could quickly effect an action, such as archiving, without its being opened.
- Smart reply: This feature employed boilerplate text to suggest appropriate replies.

Google reportedly wished, at a time then to be decided, to add the "bundles" feature to Gmail, which at the time was available only in Inbox for Gmail.

By March 2020, many Inbox features were still missing from Gmail.

== Platforms ==
Inbox by Gmail was announced on a limited invitation-only basis on October 22, 2014, available on the web, and through the Android and iOS mobile operating systems. It was officially released to the public on May 28, 2015.

== Reception ==
David Pierce of The Verge praised the service, writing that it was "minimalist and lovely, full of layers and easy to navigate. It's remarkably fast and smooth on all platforms, and far better on iOS than the Gmail app". However, he criticized the app's low density of information, with only a few emails visible on the screen at a time, making it "a bit of a challenge" for users who need to go through "hundreds of emails" every day. Although positive that "Inbox feels a lot like the future of email", Pierce wrote that there was "plenty of algorithm tweaking and design condensing to do", with particular attention needed on a "compact view" for denser view of information on the screen.

Sarah Mitroff of CNET also praised Inbox, writing, "Not only is it visually appealing, it's also full of features that help you find every message you need, when you need it". She added that users must "give up the control" to organize their email, and that it "won't vibe with everyone", but admitted that "if you're willing ... the app will reward you with a smarter and cleaner inbox." Mitroff noted that, initially, users had to coach the app about which bundle was appropriate for certain emails, writing, "It's a tedious process at first, by [sic] in just a few days Inbox starts to get it right." Regarding any downsides of the service, Mitroff wrote that "Inbox has a built-in strategy for managing your emails that works best on its own. Anyone who already has a system for organizing their emails will likely find themselves fighting Google's system".

== Discontinuation and legacy ==
Google ended the service in March 2019. Google called Inbox "a great place to experiment with new ideas" and noted that many of those ideas had been migrated to Gmail. The company wanted, going forward, to focus its resources on a single email system.

Several services, like Shortwave, attempted to resurrect some of the features of Inbox by Gmail to attract its old users.

Similarly, Inbox Reborn, an actively maintained browser extension developed by a team of volunteer developers from around the world since 2018, aims to recreate the core features and visual style of Inbox by Gmail within the standard Gmail interface. The project continues to focus on preserving functionalities such as email bundling and streamlined workflows to provide users with a familiar productivity experience.

Afterwards, most people moved to Spark, Spike, or Newton. According to a product manager at Google, a "more focused approach" regarding email was the company's goal. This is likely the reason they moved away from Inbox.
