= Hop Sing =

Hop Sing, Hopsing or variation, may refer to:

- Hop Sing (Bonanza), a fictional character, a stereotypical Chinese housekeeper on the 1959-1973 TV Western Bonanza
- Hop Sing Tong (Chinese: 合勝堂; pinyin: Héshèng Táng; Jyutping: Hap^{6}sing^{3} Tong^{4}), the Hop Sing (合勝), a tong (堂), an ethnic Chinese organization, founded in the U.S. in 1875
- Hop Sing Boys (Chinese: 合勝仔; pinyin: Hé Shèng Zǎi; Jyutping: Hap^{6}sing^{3}Zai^{2}), an ethnic Chinese crime syndicate; see List of Chinese criminal organizations
- Hop-Sing Soo (1861-1918), an early stage name for yellowface faux-Chinese American stage magician William Ellsworth Robinson, better known as Chung Ling Soo
- Hop-Sing Yim, a fictional character portrayed by Ying-Ming Lee on the 2002 PBS historical reality show Frontier House
- "Hop Sing", a track by Longmont Potion Castle from the 2005 album Longmont Potion Castle Volume 5

== See also ==
- Hip Sing Association (formerly, Hip Sing Tong)
- Hop (disambiguation)
- Sing (disambiguation)
