= Hosp =

Hosp is a surname. Notable people with the surname include:

- Nicole Hosp (born 1983), Austrian alpine skier
- Robert Hosp (1939–2021), Swiss footballer

== See also ==
- Hopp
- HOSP
