= List of Mysticons episodes =

The following is a list of episodes for the Nickelodeon/YTV animated television series Mysticons. The series was picked up for 40 episodes, which have aired over two seasons.

== Series overview ==
Season	Episodes	Originally released	
Season	Episodes	First released	Last released
1	20	August 28, 2017	February 10, 2018
2	20	February 17, 2018	September 15, 2018

== Episodes ==
=== Season 1 (2017) ===
- The second generation of legendary heroes is chosen by the all-powerful, ancient Dragon Disk as were the original four Mysticons, one thousand years ago.
- Princess Arkayna's mother, Queen Goodfey, had remarried a man named Darius, who is king consort and has a self-centered teenage son named Gawayne, who becomes acting king when his father and stepmother become bone statues.
- The special power of the human Mysticon Dragon Mage and the elven Mysticon Striker are revealed to be telekinesis and glittery, bright yellow fairy dust called her Pixie Blast attack.
- The leader of the original four Mysticons is revealed to have been Imani Firewing, who had ultimately defeated Queen Necrafa, at the cost of her own life. The original Mysticons Ranger and dwarven Knight were teenage guys and remain unnamed as does the original elven Mysticon Striker.
- We learn a little about Zarya Moonwolf's troubled childhood, three years before becoming a Mysticon; that she had was taken from her village along with her best friends Kitty and Kasey Boon.
- A new top-level Astromancer is later introduced; an orphan named Proxima Starfall.
- The Codex is combined into a larger, considerably more powerful spellbook. It is used to release Queen Necrafa from her thousand-year imprisonment, who then drains its dry of its supremely powerful magic.
- Princess Arkayna discovers that she has a long-lost fraternal twin sister, but that they had to be separated due to a prophecy foretelling imminent annihilation for the mystical world of Gemina. Their birth father had tragically perished before they were born, defending the realm from an unknown evil.

No.	Title	Directed by	Written by	Storyboards by	Original release date	Prod. code	US viewers (millions)
1	"Sisters in Arms"	Matt Ferguson	Sean Jara	Mike MacDougall; Ruth Ramirez	August 28, 2017 (CAN/US)	101	1.03
In the mystical world of Gemina on the Streets of a Place Called Drake City, Zarya and her good friend Piper are forced to steal the Disk from the Royal Palace Tower to save their furry friend Choko from a mysterious Mage. Princess Arkayna is having flight training on her griffin companion Izzie with her arrogant stepbrother Gawayne while Emerald, Queen Goodfey and King Darius watch on. Taking them to treasury chamber, Queen Goodfey explains the origin of the Dragon Disk and of the very first Mysticons who saved all of Gemina from Queen Necrafa, but had perished in the process. Arkayna expresses her disinterest, but her mother strongly advises her to pay attention and defend the Dragon Disk at all costs. Disguised as guards, Zarya and Piper retrieve the Disk and flee, but before they can escape, the evil Dreadbane and his Undead Army attack the castle. Dreadbane arrives at the throne room and turns King Darius and Queen Goodfey to solid bone. Zarya and Piper run into Emerald, Arkayna and a strong yet young astromancer by the name of Malvaron. All four girls touch the Disk, which triggers its incredible power and magically transforms them into the new generation of Mysticons: Dragon Mage, Ranger, Striker and Knight. Fully empowered, the girls' fight back against Dreadbane and his Undead Army and defeat them. After Dreadbane’s defeat, Zarya and Piper escape with the Dragon Disk. Zarya and Piper give the Mage the Dragon Disk and get Choko back, but they are attacked by the Mage. The Mage escapes after Arkayna, Emerald and Malvaron come on the scene in their Mysticon forms. They find Zarya and Piper because of a tracking spell Malvaron had cast on Zarya. Arkayna is furious that they gave the Dragon Disk to the Mage, but Zarya calmly reveals that the Mage did not get away with the actual Disk, as she had made a duplicate to trick her into releasing Choko. Now that they are united as the new Mysticons, the girls reluctantly agree to work as a team to defend Gemina from the wrath of the Spectral Hand, just as the original four Mysticons did one thousand years ago.
2	"How to Train a Mysticon"	Matt Ferguson	Grant Sauvé	Mike MacDougall; Ruth Ramirez	August 29, 2017 (CAN/US)	102	0.85
The new Mysticons get called to Astromancer Island to begin their training. The Astromancer Tazma, Malvaron’s older sister, reveals that four fragments of the ancient and all-powerful Codex are scattered all across the realm; once they reassemble the Codex, it will increase all of their magical abilities a hundredfold. The Dragon Disk presents the new Mysticons with the very first riddle and succeed in acquiring the first fragment. Tazma reveals herself to be a traitor (and the Mage who forced Piper and Zarya to steal the Dragon Disk in the previous episode) and tries to obtain the first Codex fragment's great mystical powers for herself. With her treachery discovered, Malvaron, who is equally talented as his sister, becomes their new instructor and is aided by his good friend Doug Hadderstrom. Princess Arkayna manages to obtain the first piece of the Codex, which is revealed to be a large, green book of spells representing the bright green dragon bracer, belonging to the leader of the Mysticons- Mysticon Dragon Mage. Its attack phrase is "Unleash the Dragon!"
3	"The Coronation"	Matt Ferguson	Amanda Spagnolo	Kirk Jorgensen; Victor Marchetti	August 30, 2017 (CAN/US)	103	0.89
Arkayna begins misusing her Mysticon abilities to decorate her room, brushing aside Malvaron's warning that she should only use her magic to defend the realm from evil. At the castle, Gawayne invites everyone in the kingdom of Gemina to celebrate his coronation except Arkayna, who is infuriated that her self-centered stepbrother gets to be crowned king, and directs her intense anger and jealously in her Mysticon training. Malvaron and Doug plan for Boy's Night In while Zarya, Emerald and Piper go to the castle for the coronation. As Princess Arkayna continues to misuse her mystical Mage powers to impress the people, Acting King Gawayne is abducted by Dreadbane's minions, and a cranky female troll named Kymraw, who will only release him unless the Mysticons give her the Dragon Disk.
4	"The Mysticon Kid"	Matt Ferguson	Steph Kaliner	Kirk Jorgensen; Victor Marchetti	August 31, 2017 (CAN/US)	104	0.92
Piper's childish nature is getting on the others nerves, but are interrupted when the Dragon Disk reveals the second riddle where the second fragment of the ancient Codex book lies hidden. They head to the mall, where the second piece is. Unfortunately, Tazma, alongside an army of skeletons and Dreadbane himself, arrive to stop the Mysticons. After capturing Arkayna and Zarya, they arrive at the carousel, where Emerald and Piper are. Piper manages to decipher the riddle and retrieve the second Codex piece that represents the yellow Phoenix. Its attack phrase is "Fly, Phoenix, Fly!"
5	"An Eye for an Eye"	Matt Ferguson	Shelley Scarrow	Ruth Ramirez; Greg Collinson	September 1, 2017 (CAN/US)	105	0.92
Zarya's temper gets her into trouble when she uses her newfound Mysticon Ranger powers to settle a personal score with Mathis. Promising Arkayna that she would not use her Mysticon powers for revenge, Zarya casts a high-level revenge spell from Arkayna's Dragon Mage spellbook of the Codex. A gargoyle-like creature attacks Mathis and, later, Arkayna on her balcony at the castle. The Mysticons learn that the creature is really Zarya herself. Now the others are forced to fight their fellow Mysticon and companion. Arkayna succeeds in dousing her with the last dose of the antidote. When Zarya runs into Mathis again, she merely ignores his petty insults.
6	"Heart of Gold"	Matt Ferguson	Elize Morgan	James Caswell; Tom Nesbitt	September 3, 2017 (US) September 17, 2017 (CAN)	106	1.16
After rescuing dwarf workers at the collapsing mines, the Mysticons head to Emerald's hometown of Rudix Hollow, which Emerald says is "boring". Meanwhile, deep underground, Dreadbane searches for a rare ore called Solarite, which he will use to have the Mysticons cower in fear at his feet. Unfortunately, for him, there is too much titanium. Emerald reluctantly introduces Arkayna, Zarya and Piper to her welcoming and overexcited mother, and bickering younger twin brothers, Halite and Farris. However, her father, Malachite, disapproves of his daughter's work at the castle. After failing to talk to him, Emerald flies off on Topaz. Arkayna, Zarya and Piper transform into their Mysticon forms and go to stop the mines from caving in again. Dreadbane arrives and abducts Malachite and Piper, leaving Arkayna and Zarya unable to stop him. Emerald arrives too late and her Mysticon sword is incapable of cutting through the rock slide, which can only be breached by Solarite. With Malachite as his captive, Dreadbane forces him to reveal the location of the Heart of Gold. He then threatens Piper to get Emerald's father to comply, which he does. In her father's basement, Emerald upgrades and modifies her childhood battle-suit with Mysticon magic. She then uses it to break through the rocks slide, releasing Zarya and Arkayna. At the valley of the Heart of Gold, the Mysticons arrive to take down Dreadbane. Zarya gets to Piper and Malachite while Emerald holds off Dreadbane in her armored suit. Dreadbane escapes yet again, leaving the Solarite-powered drill running. Emerald uses her skills as a dwarf engineer to turn it off. Upon seeing his daughter in action, Malachite finally admits that he has always had a daughter he could be proud off. At Dreadbane's lair, he learns from his minions that is just enough Solarite to further fulfill his plans.
7	"Scourge of the Seven Skies"	Matt Ferguson	Grant Sauvé	Ruth Ramirez; Greg Collinson	September 10, 2017 (US) September 24, 2017 (CAN)	107	1.05
The Mysticons meet Zarya's old childhood friend Kitty Boon, who is captain of the Pink Skulls, a gang of sky pirates. Zarya invites the Skulls to an impromptu party on the Mysticons' balcony. Kitty claims the Mysticons are her idols, but Arkayna and Piper distrust her, especially after Piper downloads all of the data from the Pink Skulls' computer, revealing that their travels coincide with the locations of recent robberies. The Mysticons soon have to fight Dreadbane's minions as well. When Zarya learns what Piper has done, she's infuriated that her teammates would do something so underhanded and quits the Mysticons to rejoin her "real friends", the Pink Skulls. However, she's shocked when she learns that the Mysticons have been Kitty's real targets all along. Princess Arkayna, Emerald and Piper are on their way to the Cavern of the Cosmos in search of the third piece of the Codex, which requires the all-powerful Dragon Disk to reveal it. Seeing Kitty's true colors, Zarya tries to stop the Pink Skulls and help her fellow Mysticons, whom she now realizes are her true friends. Unfortunately, Kitty succeeds in snatching the Dragon Disk from Arkayna, who gives it to Dreadbane in return for gold. It is revealed that Dreadbane plans to utilize the mighty mystical powers of the Dragon Disk to resurrect Queen Necrafa herself. A furious Arkayna expels Zarya from the team, condemning her as "a disgrace to the Mysticons".
8	"Lost and Found"	Matt Ferguson	Amanda Spagnolo	Tom Nesbitt; Rachel Peters	September 17, 2017 (US) September 24, 2017 (CAN)	108	0.98
Guilt-ridden over her role in the Mysticons' losing the Dragon Disk, Zarya quits the group, taking Choko with her. Attempting to start a new life in the Forest of Brynn, she finds a cavern full of sparkly rocks. Back in Drake City, Piper is plagued by her childhood memories of befriending Zarya, and hesitantly joins Emerald and Arkayna on returning to the Cavern of the Cosmos to recover the third fragment of the Codex. Dreadbane and Tazma force the Dragon Disk to reveal the location, where they head to retrieve the Codex, which has been already taken by a diamondback worm. Meanwhile, Malavaron tries to locate Zarya and ends up forcing Neeko to reveal her whereabouts. Arkayna, Emerald and Piper arrive at the cavern but are unable to find the Codex fragment, due to not having the Dragon Disk. Although scared of being without Zarya, Piper goes off to guard the entrance but continues to be plagued by her nightmarish memories of being attacked by a shadow creature from when she had first arrived in the Undercity. Due to this distraction, Dreadbane is able to capture the three Mysticons. In the Forest of Brynn, Malvaron finds Zarya and tries to convince her to return but she refuses. However, when they are attacked by a group of mushroom monsters, Zarya transforms into Mysticon Ranger, helps Malavaron defeat the creatures, and is eventually convinced to rejoin the team. Back in the cavern, General Tiberon gets the Codex piece, which is shown to be Zarya's own spellbook. When the diamondback worm returns and attacks, Dreadbane and his forces retreat, leaving the Mysticons to their fate. Zarya, Malavaron and Choko return and free their friends in time for a climactic battle, which culminates in the diamondback worm eating Piper and seemingly burning her to a crisp in a pool of lava. Distraught, Zarya admits that she could never do without Piper by her side or her friends. Piper then reveals herself to be unharmed, and the four Mysticons joyfully reunite, their friendship restored. With the third fragment of the ancient and all-powerful Codex in his hands, Dreadbane corrupts Zarya's light blue, mystical Wolf Bracer and says that "the hunt" is now beginning.
9	"The Astromancer Job"	Matt Ferguson	S. Elize Morgan	Ruth Ramirez; Greg Collinson	September 24, 2017 (US) October 1, 2017 (CAN)	109	0.92
The Mysticons are reprimanded by Nova Terron and the other Astromancers for losing both the Dragon Disk and a fragment of the Codex to Dreadbane, putting the realm into even greater danger. Once imprisoning Malvaron, Nova Terron orders the Mysticons to leave, which they do and Arkayna vows to fix everything and prove her and her friends worthy. At Arkayna's urging, Piper, Zarya and Emerald go to three different corners of the realm to find the three necessary items to create a working copy of the all-powerful Dragon Disk: A dragon lotus from the Forest of Doom, lava from the Volcano of Doom, and lightning in a bottle from the Sky of Doom. Once they manage to create the replica, they go to infiltrate the castle of the great and powerful Astromancers to enter the Celestial Forge, so they can harness it into the Dragon Disk copy. Meanwhile, Dreadbane uses the blue Codex spellbook to perfect his work at the archway. Tazma wonders what it is for, but Dreadbane chastises her into that her job is only for magical affairs. Princess Arkayna is approached by Nova Terron who says that he is to be their Selon now. He disapproves of her room decor until he is distracted by a video game Doug shows him, Avatars of the Apocalypse which he seems to enjoy. The other three Mysticons enter the Star Chamber and release Malvaron who hesitantly agrees to help unlock the door to the Celestial Forge with help from Arkayna's mystical Dragon staff. However, by disturbing the Celestial Forge, a rift in space opens and creatures come through, terrorizing Drake City. Emerald and Zarya head off to defend the people, as Arkayna and Piper protect the Astromancers who are furious. Arkayna and Piper then manage to close the rift by unleashing the attack power of the green Dragon and yellow Phoenix. At the castle, the Mysticons are again scolded for their error in almost annihilating the whole realm merely to create a knockoff Dragon Disk. All are amazed, however, when the copy activates and shows the riddle for the 4th and last piece of the Codex. Back at Spectra Hand's lair, Tazma remains curious as to where the archway leads to and learns that Queen Necrafa is, in fact, alive on the other side of the gate.: Queen Necrafa was ultimately defeated by the leader of the original Mysticons, the very first Dragon Mage by the name of Imani Firewing, and was thus imprisoned in a desert world for the next thousand years. Unfortunately, this final act of bravery and sacrifice had cost Imani her life.
10	"A Walk in the Park"	Matt Ferguson	Steph Kaliner	Ruth Ramirez; Greg Collinson; Tom Nesbitt; Mars Cabrera	October 1, 2017 (CAN) October 8, 2017 (US)	110	0.62
While in a midair battle, Princess Arkayna, Piper and Zarya distract Dreadbane and Tazma while Emerald retrieves her medium-sized purple Codex spellbook and pink Unicorn Bracer from the top of the royal castle. During the skirmish, Zarya is hit hard with one her dark spells. The worried Mysticons seek the help of Tazma and Malvaron's aunt Yaga, so she can reverse the dark spell. Going into Centaur Park, they are suddenly separated by the trees moving. A weakened Zarya and Emerald try to rejoin the others but are stopped by a herd of small centaurs. Meanwhile, in another part of the park, Malvaron and Princess Arkayna breathe in the sweet, sweet pollen of Love's Breath and fall for each other. An exasperated Piper tries to snap them out of it but to no avail. Emerald uses her orb to locate the others and protect Zarya, who is getting weaker and weaker as the spell continues to spread. It is then that they are attacked by Auntie Yaga herself who believes her niece's fabrication that they stole from her. Emerald manages to overpower Yaga by unleashing the mighty, mystical power of her Unicorn Bracer. Piper then releases her great Phoenix powers, turning Malvaron and Arkayna to normal, embarrassing them greatly. Emerald and Zarya reveal to Yaga about her niece's true colors and she sends Tazma away to the same place where Dreadbane is. They both breathe in Love's Breath and start dancing the tango.: The fourth and final spellbook of the Codex is found, as is its pink Unicorn Bracer; attack phrase is "Battle Unicorn Charge!"
11	"A Girl and Her Gumlump"	Matt Ferguson	Ashley Lannigan	Ruth Ramirez; Greg Collinson	October 8, 2017 (CAN) October 15, 2017 (US)	111	0.64
Piper wants a pet for her 110th birthday, so she gets a lump of white goo to prove she that really is responsible to own one. however, when she shows it her chest of mystical treasures, it multiples into more and more gumlumps that have a ravenous appetite for magic. They manage to escape the stronghold and cause chaos all over Drake City. In an ancient book of powerful spells, Arkayna and Malvaron devise a plan to lure the gumlumps into a portal and trap them inside a dimension without magic. Unfortunately, they succeed in draining Malvaron of most of his astromancer magic as well as the three Codex spellbooks. Meanwhile, Gawayne is fed up with the Mysticons getting all the glory and attention, so he brags about becoming a hero. In Centaur Park, the Mysticons try to lure the Gumlumps into the star nexus to buy time for Arkayna to open a vortex to the magic-less world. When Zarya, Emerald and Piper are swarmed by Gumlumps and drained of their Mysticon magic, Arkayna manages to open the portal and use an energy beam to attract them. Piper calls for Gawayne and uses his magical armor which imprisons the Gumlumps into the realm without magic. Once they have disappeared, the Mysticons and Malvaron regain their powers. Piper tearfully urges one last Gumlump to go to its new home. With magic restored, everyone relaxes with a bowl of cereal. Piper is then seen to be feeding the Gumlumps from the portal, as she thinks they are still cute.
12	"Skies of Fire"	Matt Ferguson	Grant Sauvé	Rachel Peters; Mars Cabrera	October 8, 2017 (CAN) October 22, 2017 (US)	112	0.52
With Tazma's aid, Dreadbane bombards Drake City with a shower of meteors, demanding that the Mysticons hand over their three spellbooks of the Codex within an hour. The Mysticons enlist the assistance of Kitty Boon and her fellow sky-pirates to distract Dreadbane and Tazma while they retrieve Zarya's dark blue spellbook and light blue Wolf Bracer, as well as the mighty Dragon Disk. Zarya earlier reveals her identity as Mysticon Ranger to Kitty and later goes off alone to rescue her best childhood friend from being imprisoned for her sake several years ago. At Dreadbane's lair, Princess Arkayna, Piper and Emerald find the place where Tazma is casting a very strong spell from Zarya's blue Codex spellbook to control the direction of the meteors. Emerald uses her dwarf gadgets to blow the star controller to smithereens, but the foz come near it, endangering themselves. Not wanting them destroyed, Piper releases her powerful Phoenix Bracer's strength to overwhelm Dreadbane. Tazma retrains her, Emerald and Arkayna while her lord and master taunts them for failing to defend the city from his wrath; that he will turn them all to stone, as he did Princess Arkayna's mother and stepfather. Thankfully, Zarya shows up and claims her mystical Wolf Bracer and Codex spellbook from his clutches. As they run, Arkayna sees the incomplete gateway, coming to realize a horrifying truth: Queen Necrafa is very much alive; imprisoned in some far off world. After being saved by the Pink Skulls, Emerald and Kasey appear to have rekindled their budding romance. Kitty reveals that she had retrieved the original Dragon Disk for them and apologizes for having taken it in the first place. On the other side of the Pink Skulls' flying ship, Princess Arkayna voices her horrifying discovery to Malvaron.: Zarya manages to reclaim her medium-sized spellbook of the Codex and light blue Wolf Bracer, whose attack phrase is "Time to Howl!" This thoroughly completes the Codex.
13	"All Hail Necrafa!"	Matt Ferguson	Sean Jara	Tom Nesbitt; James Caswell	October 15, 2017 (CAN) October 29, 2017 (US)	113	0.65
The Mysticons succeed in unifying the Codex into one large spellbook. Arkayna is ready to use its vast magical power and high-level spells to save her mother and stepfather from petrification, but Nova Terron stops her, claiming that the Codex must be destroyed. Malvaron explains to the shocked and furious Mysticons that without the Codex, Dreadbane will be incapable of releasing Queen Necrafa. Angry of Malvaron choosing the Astromancers over their friendship, Arkayna and the other three Mysticons head off to recover the Codex and keep it safe from destruction. The Astromancers pursue them, but are unable to stop the Mysticons from escaping with the Pink Skulls. Malvaron shows his loyalty and friendship by deactivating the protection spell around the Codex, saying that he will help Arkayna bring back her parents. Elsewhere, Tazma finds Kymraw, who says that her so-called "leader" is weak, that his ignorance will be his downfall. She proposes an alliance with Kymraw by giving her gold. The two villainesses go to recover the great and powerful Codex for themselves and put an end to the Mysticons. Zarya, Emerald and Piper head out of their griffin mounts to give Malvaron and Arkayna time to complete the spell to reverse stone into flesh. Unfortunately, for them all, Kymraw grabs the Codex and flies off as the statues of Queen Goodfey and King Darius fall into the sea. In the lair of the Spectral Hand, Dreadbane uses the Codex to release Necrafa at last. He is shocked when the evil witch Queen attacks him for failing to free her sooner, and hurls him through the gateway, as she loves him not. She then commands the Codex to fill her with its immeasurable power, much to Tazma's horror. Her drastically strengthened evil magic starts to affect most of the realm, to which Nova Terron replies that "the apocalypse is upon us" as the Queen of the Undead laughs evilly.: A new, more mysterious top-level Astromancer by the name of Proxima Starfall debuts.
14	"The Dome"	Matt Ferguson	Grant Sauvé	Ruth Ramirez; Greg Collinson	October 15, 2017 (CAN) November 5, 2017 (US)	114	0.63
Now that she is finally released, Necrafa resumes her role as Queen of the Spectral Hand by turning her skeleton army into spectral-like creatures. Tazma tries to escape, but is discovered and brought before her. Determined to save her own skin, she reveals to Necrafa that she had helped Dreadbane release her, and that there are new Mysticons. Queen Necrafa does not believe her, as the Mysticons had perished long ago defeating her. Tazma contradicts her, stating that the Dragon Disk has chosen new Mysticons in her absence. To prove her worth to the evil queen, Tazma assures her that she will help her get the revenge she seeks if she is spared. Back at the Crystal Archipelago, Arkayna dives into the sea to recover her parents' stone forms, leaving Zarya in charge. While the Astromancers prepare to defend Drake City via a protective dome-shaped shield, Zarya, Emerald and Piper are ready to take down Queen Necrafa and her spectral army, but the drastically increased dark powers of the Queen of the Undead proves too strong even for them. The Astromancers are having difficulty raising the dome, so Proxima tries to repair it. Meanwhile, Arkayna is having problems raising her mother and stepfather's statues to the surface. She suddenly has a vision of her mother, who assures Arkayna that they will be together again, but as the Dragon Mage, she must defend the realm first. Flying on Izzie, Arkayna almost reaches past the dome, but is knocked down on an island. She witnesses Tazma and Necrafa slowing down the dome and planning to cast a dark spell to turn everyone into undead zombies as Necrafa's servants. At the palace tower, Arkayna attempts to stall Necrafa while Piper and Emerald sneak in the Astromancer's base to deactivate the dome. Zarya later reveals that it only reversed Necrafa's deathly spell, forcing the evil queen to flee. In the Astromancer's castle, Proxima demands that the Mysticons be "brought to justice".
15	"Clash of the Tridents"	Matt Ferguson	Sandra Kasturi	Ruth Ramirez; Tom Nesbitt; Mars Cabrera	October 22, 2017 (CAN) November 12, 2017 (US)	115	0.50
The Mysticons dive under the sea to retrieve the bone solid statues of Princess Arkayna's mother and stepfather, via water-breathing potions. Arkayna takes them back to the seeker orb where she had left them, but finds the stone forms of her mother and stepfather nowhere. On land, Malvaron, Doug and Choko accidentally mix two potions and end up teleporting all over the realm. The Mysticons are suddenly attacked by a young and tough mermaid named Kelpie Truefin who believes them to be trespassers and takes them as her prisoners. Emerald is excited to meet a legendary Mermaid-Knight of the Order of the Silver Trident, as she heard so much about them in myths. Not impressed, Princess Kelpie takes them to her mother, Queen Truefin, who urges them all to hide from the kraken which has come its tribute: The bone forms of King Darius and Queen Goodfey! Princess Arkayna tells Queen Truefin that they are her parents and they mean the world to her. Queen Truefin refuses to release them as they are the only thing keeping her and her daughter safe. The Mysticons assure her that the only way to have her people return is to fight the kraken head on. Wanting to prove to her mother that she can be brave and fearless, Kelpie goes to face the kraken alone. The Mysticons and Queen Truefin follow and combine the power of their magical weaponry to take the kraken down. At first it seems to have no effect, but the Mysticons unleash the attack power of their animal bracers, trapping the kraken behind some rocks. On the surface, Queen Truefin apologizes for her actions, as fear blinded her to their help. Arkayna says that if they are ever in trouble again, the Mysticons will be there for them. The Mysticons then help Princess Kelpie and Queen Truefin redecorate and beautify their undersea kingdom of Coral Keep, as their people return home after many years.: Emerald is given an additional mystical weapon, besides the pink-and-purple flame-shaped Knight Star Sword; one of the legendary Silver Tridents as a reward for bravery.
16	"Gems of the Past"	Matt Ferguson	Steph Kaliner	Tom Nesbitt; Don Kim; Noel Tuazon	October 22, 2017 (CAN) November 19, 2017 (US)	116	0.54
Queen Necrafa appears in Victory Heights and creates an earthquake that brings up a purple and a green gem from the depths of the earth. Affixing them to her necklace, she goes to find the other two. At the palace, Arkayna, Zarya, Piper and Emerald are shocked to see a news story of Nova Terron declaring them outlaws and a reward for their capture. They are interrupted by Gawayne, who shows them an orange gem and a blue gem, asking Arkayna for advice on which one looks better, as he plans to give one to his pixie girlfriend Lateensia as their "dating one whole month" gift. Malvaron calls and say that they need to meet up at Victory Heights right away. Arriving at the scene, Barnabas says that he saw Necrafa taking two objects out of the earth. To learn more, Malvaron casts a hindsight spell which takes him and the Mysticons back in time one thousand years ago when the original Dragon Mage, Imani Firewing, had defeated the evil Queen of the Undead in one single blast. Freezing time, they see that Necrafa had lost the four gems in her necklace when Imani blasted her with the mystical Star Dragon bracer, therefore taking her own life in the process. The Mysticons go to find the gems before Necrafa, but Necrafa succeeds in getting the orange gem, then sucks away Arkayna and Emerald’s blazers into her necklace. Before they can go after her, they are briefly captured by the Astromancers, as Mathis had tipped them off with "a Mysticon sighting," but the Mysticons escape. Arkayna is worried that she cannot reach Gawayne, so Piper makes her look silly so Gawayne can enjoy it and reveal where he is: Sky Pies. While having pizza, Gawayne gives Lateensia the blue gem, but she dumps him, as it's not working out due to his selfishness, leaving him crushed. Necrafa appears and demands Gawayne to give her back her gem. The Mysticons arrive to back Gawayne up, as he runs away in fear. Arkayna duels Queen Necrafa while Zarya, Emerald and Piper defend the customers. In her fury, Necrafa teleports all of them outside in midair, where they fall. Summoning their griffins, the Mysticons go to catch each citizen and get the last gem. Unfortunately, Necrafa succeeds and is near to affixing it into her necklace. Piper uses her Phoenix bracer, but it is absorbed by the necklace. Fortunately, Zarya blasts Necrafa with her mystical Wolf bracer and reclaims the gems and the other Mysticons’ bracers. When Nova Terron and the other Astromancers arrive, the people block their path, allowing the Mysticons to escape. In the end the Astromancers stood down and Arkayna says that no matter the people say "We’ll always be their Mysticons".: Princess Arkayna calls out Release the Dragon!" here instead of "Unleash the Dragon!"
17	"Quest of the Vexed"	Matt Ferguson	Ashley Lannigan	Tom Nesbitt; Jeff Astolfo	October 29, 2017 (CAN) December 3, 2017 (US)	117	0.59
With Arkayna always bossing her around, Emerald hides her increasing frustration and fury by bottling it up in thirty Vex-Away canisters. During a chase with Kymraw, she accidentally drops one in Centaur Park, causing it to break and infect the centaurs with her own rage. Zarya assures her that it is fine to show her anger at times, even healthy, but Emerald still insists on using the Vex-Away to "calm her". She returns to the park and is shocked to find the canister nearly empty, that her own fury is infecting everyone throughout Drake city. She returns to warn the others, only to find them all under the spell of hate as well. She and Arkayna go to find a negating spell in Malvaron's spell pad. Emerald realizes that his password is, in fact, "Arkayna", signifying his romantic affections toward the princess. Unfortunately, he and Arkayna begin to despise each other under the influence of the Vex-Away. Emerald manages to reverse the fury and anger into kindness and forgiveness. She and Arkayna apologize and plan to spend more time together by shopping at Magi Mall. When the Vex-Away commercial comes on again, Emerald angrily asks it to stop.
18	"Mutiny Most Fowl"	Matt Ferguson	Jocelyn Geddie	Dave Baggley; Paul Soeiro	October 29, 2017 (CAN) December 10, 2017 (US)	118	0.52
Emerald's first date with Kasey is rudely interrupted when he is kidnapped by the evil pirate Captain Kaos. The Mysticons set off on a swashbuckling adventure to rescue Kasey, while Kaos wants revenge on Kitty and Zarya, who had marooned him on an island as children. Using a special chant with a personal object belonging to all of them, Kaos hypnotizes Kitty and her fellow sky pirates into coming back with him to "give them a taste of their own medicine." Zarya realizes this and takes command of the Pink Skulls ship, with Arkayna having more difficulty than Emerald and Piper at keeping the ship on course. Kaos learns of Zarya's identity as Mysticon Ranger and hypnotizes her as well using a jeweled pendant that had belonged to her late mother. Fortunately, Zarya managed to resist, thanks the orb phones Emerald made her wear. She and the Mysticons help Kitty and Kasey elude Captain Kaos once again, but he knocks Kitty unconscious and throws her down toward the ruins, prompting Zarya to go save her which ends up with them almost losing their very souls. Having had enough, Zarya utilizes her Wolf Bracer's mystical energies to push Captain Kaos into the awaiting ruins, which absorbs his entire being. As everyone leaves on their way, Zarya admits to Kitty she still misses her parents, even though she has recovered her mother's pendant. Kitty comforts her, saying that she now can remember them via the pendant and that she, too, misses her parents. Happy that the nightmare is finally over, they fly on. Back on the island, the malevolent force within the ruins is shown to be still at large, as a mysterious symbol glows in its center, which happens to be the symbol of Queen Necrafa.
19	"Through My Enemy's Eyes"	Matt Ferguson	Steph Kaliner	Greg Collinson; Tom Nesbitt	December 17, 2017 (US) April 8, 2018 (CAN)	119	0.50
Tazma infiltrates the Astromancer Academy and takes down Nova Terron and his fellow Astromancers with ease. The Mysticons then follow her to the lair of the Spectral Hand, back to the gateway, and into the realm of darkness where Queen Necrafa of the Undead had been imprisoned for a thousand years. Upon entering, they split up to retrieve the great and powerful Codex spellbook, only to run into an old foe: Dreadbane, who appears to have lost his memory and says his name is "Reginald." Still furious at him for turning her mother and stepfather into stone, Princess Arkayna refuses to believe him. He shows them his flower garden, which he reveals that he made only for "his queen" whom the Mysticons realize is Necrafa. Elsewhere, Tazma is plagued by her conscience, who says that she is her own worst enemy and that she will never be as good as her brother. Piper asks Dreadbane if he has seen the Codex, to which he replies that he had. The Mysticons search for it in the garden and Arkayna recovers it. Tazma then teleports and grabs the Codex, promoting the Mysticons to go after her before she enters the portal. In a strange turn of events, Dreadbane attacks Tazma and warns her that Necrafa will betray her, just as she did him. Princess Arkayna gets the Codex and she and her fellow Mysticons arrive safely back in Gemina. Back at the Astromancer Academy, Princess Arkayna expresses her pity for Dreadbane, but presents the Codex to Nova Terron and his fellow astromancers. He is shocked, however, to find the Dragon Disk missing on the cover, as it is the only way to reveal "the prophecy". Zarya then recalls their knockoff Dragon Disk, which they and Nova Terron use to reveal the prophecy. At the same time, Necrafa is utilizing the Disk for the same purpose, which reveals "doom for their enemy". Meanwhile, Dreadbane returns to the world of Gemina using Zarya's bowstring.
20	"The Prophecy Unleashed"	Matt Ferguson	Sandra Kasturi; Sean Jara	Ruth Ramirez; Paul Soeiro	December 24, 2017 (US) April 8, 2018 (CAN)	120	0.39
Having read the apocalyptic contents of the prophecy, the Mysticons, Nova Terron, and new astromancer Proxima Starfall all race through ancient caverns to recover a spectral dragon egg before Tazma gets her hands on it. Malvaron stays behind on guard duty, but he and the other astromancers decide to pass the time by playing the card game "Beastie Monsters". In the Caverns of the Fang, Tazma and Tibion leave something to deal with their enemies as they go further on. Proxima had memorized the map of the caves and takes the lead, much to the annoyance of Arkayna and Zarya. As they go on, Arkayna comes to the realization that the prophecy was not referring to actual stars. Nova Terron then reveals that it spoke of the royal fraternal twins that were born 15 years ago. He explains that in order to protect the world of Gemina from its inevitable annihilation, he took the fraternal twin and erased Queen Goodfey's memory of her other daughter. He was then ordered to send her away to another dimension, far on the astral plane. Learning that she had a twin sister, an enraged Arkayna attacks Nova Terron and causes a cave in which separates her and Nova Terron from the others. Furious and heart-broken that such a secret was kept from her, Arkayna displays her unusually strong telekinetic abilities and demands that Nova Terron explain himself. Nova Terron wonders as to the Dragon Mage's personal feelings in this, but she refuses to give him an answer. Arkayna states that once the quest to secure the spectral dragon egg was over, they would be as well. She and Nova Terron continue on and find the egg. Tazma and General Tibion suddenly appear and a duel ensures between them. They are soon backed up by Proxima and the others, but Tazma succeeds in taking the egg of the mythical spectral dragon. Nova Terron and Arkayna fly on Izzie in pursuit, but Nova Terron is blasted by Tazma and falls. Making a difficult decision, Arkayna goes to save him. Nova Terron thanks her and asks why she is taking this revelation so personally. Arkayna then reveals her identity as the Princess, which causes Nova Terron to break down in tears of regret and guilt. He reveals that he could not bring himself to send her away, but had her hidden away in a forest, where she was raised by an old woman. The Mysticons vow to go and find Arkayna's long-lost twin, no matter what. Tazma presents the egg to Necrafa, who states that the thing they must do is find the "twin stars" and wait patiently for Gemina's inevitable annihilation.: Teen Titans Season 4 episode has a somewhat similar title "The Prophecy"

=== Season 2 (2018) ===
- Piper Willowbrook is sent to an alternate past via a magical coin.
- Orphaned top Astromancer, Proxima Starfall, is revealed to have been nothing but a decoy to protect the identity of the younger Princes Twin of Gemina, Zarya Moonwolf.
- Thoroughly heartbroken and feeling deserted and betrayed by her "twin sister" Princess Arkayna, Proxima has donned half of the evil mask worn by Queen Necrafa, allowing its ancient evil powers to consume her feelings of further loneliness and abandonment on her path of vengeance on the Mysticons.
- The all-powerful Dragon Disk has drained of all of its ancient mystical powers since Queen Necrafa had thoroughly drained the completed Codex after her release
- Evil counterparts of the Mysticons are created: the Vexicons- Mallory, Kasha, Willa and Eartha. They also have an animal sidekick; a turquoise female fox called Deeva.
- The ancient and mighty Dragons of Light are revealed to not be extinct after all, as an infant storm dragon called "Stormy" is discovered by the Mysticons and leaves with the Panhandler, who is revealed to be the supposedly deceased King Valmauk himself.
- Dreadbane undoes the spell he himself had cast on King Darius and Queen Goodfey many months ago.
- Princess Arkayna finally reunites with her mother and introduces her to Zarya Moonwolf, the younger twin daughter she never knew she had. Her brief memories of her, however, are restored off-screen.
- The Mysticons seemed to have chosen the unnamed Dragons of Light as their animal companions over their longtime faithful griffins, as they were seen astride the dragons' in the final scene; it is unknown if they still have their mystical lightning Lances of Justice.

In the United States, episodes moved to Nicktoons as it debuted on January 13, 2018. A feature film is said to be in consideration.

No. overall	No. in season	Title	Directed by	Written by	Storyboards by	Original release date	Prod. code	US viewers (millions)
21	1	"Three Mysticons and a Baby"	Matt Ferguson	Jocelyn Geddie	Greg Collinson; Ruth Ramirez; Jeff Astolfo	January 13, 2018 (US) April 15, 2018 (CAN)	201	0.14
At the Astromancer Academy, Nova Terron is chastised by his fellow Astromancers for separating the twin princesses and keeping such knowledge from the Council. Proxima realizes that Tazma had gotten this crucial information as well when she had probed Nova Terron's subconscious. Arkayna demands that she and the other Mysticons need to find the twin before Necrafa and Tazma do. Nova Terron reveals that only one individual knows of her, Hortensia Q. Sparklebottom whose name makes Piper giggle. As her sanctuary is clocked by fairy magic, Nova Terron gives them the spell that will guide the Mysticons to the fairy orphanage but warns them of the matron's overprotective and motherly nature in protecting the children she takes in. Proxima then reminds all about the Princess and urges Nova Terron to confine her to the hallowed halls of the Academy indefinitely, as it is the only way to prevent the prophecy from being fulfilled. Nova Terron and Princess Arkayna have a plan to turn Choko into a likeness of herself, so the Princess and Dragon Mage will not be found as one and the same. Proxima then appears and states that she has been chosen to chaperone the Princess around the Academy. On the way, the Mysticons see the fairy Lateensia who is a volunteer at the orphanage. As only pixies and babies are allowed entry, Arkayna has Zarya drink a potion that turns her into a toddler, much to her disgust and annoyance. Arkayna distracts Lateensia by impersonating her stepbrother Gawayne on Lateensia's phone. Baby Zarya manages to lose the remainder of the potion and roams around the orphanage in tears. The Mysticons sneak in to find Mrs. Sparklebottom watching an episode of Questica Nightly: Mage Detective. By opening the vault, Arkayna finds her twin sister's birth gem but it falls into the hands of Tazma. In the struggle, the gemstone shatters, leaving Arkayna devastated. Mrs. Sparklebottom assures her that the birth gems are not the only places she keeps information but in her own mind as well. She shows Arkayna her twin sister as an infant, which shocks her. Back at the Academy, Nova Terron and the three Mysticons and Arkayna inform Proxima that they have found the identity of her long-lost fraternal twin: Proxima herself, who is shocked upon the revelation of her true parentage.
22	2	"Star-Crossed Sisters"	Matt Ferguson	Corey Liu	Tom Nesbitt; Dave Baggley	January 20, 2018 (US) April 15, 2018 (CAN)	202	0.08
Tazma enacts her grudge against Kymraw for double-crossing her by hypnotizing the gruff troll in doing her bidding. Meanwhile, at her balcony, Arkayna is desperate to spend time with Proxima, as she wants to get to know her twin sister more. She turns Emerald to stone and meets Proxima, writing in her diary with the same quill pen she uses for her own diary. Although hesitant, Proxima is given a tour of all Arkayna's favorite hang-outs, where the two twin princesses gradually form a strong bond of sisterhood. Tazma has her hypnotized troll minions follow them, where she learns the identity of the long-lost twin princess and shows her to Necrafa. Wearing twin teleportation bracelets that Arkayna had bought, she and Proxima learn to teleport across large distances and elude Tazma and Kymraw for now but this act causes them to partially merge as well. Arkayna takes Proxima to her birthplace, the palace's throne room, where Proxima voices her hurt feelings about Arkayna getting to know their mother, Queen Goodfey, as Proxima had missed her mother her whole life; believing she didn't have a mother. Arkayna then takes her twin to the Mysticon's lair, with the intention of using the Codex to split them up. Malvaron, Piper, Zarya and Emerald (who was earlier unfrozen by Malvaron) catch them. They reveal that the Codex is now completely powerless since Queen Necrafa had drained it dry once she was released. Malvaron calls his aunt Geraldine Yaga who is relaxing on Earth, to undo the merger of Prox-ayna. However, Tazma and Kymraw suddenly show up and pursue "Prox-ayna" throughout Drake City. Unfortunately, for Tazma ad Kymraw, they too have partially merged when they had teleported after Prox-ayna. Emerald, Piper and Zarya use their mystic Unicorn, Phoenix and Wolf bracers to defeat the troll orcs. At the Astromancer Academy, Arkayna apologizes for defying Nova Terron and says a heartfelt goodbye to Proxima who is going to remain on the planet of Earth with Yaga; the twin princesses share another sisterly hug and part for the good of all of Gemina, with the promise to see each other again someday.: The Codex is revealed to have, indeed, been thoroughly drained of its supremely powerful, ancient magic since Queen Necrafa had demanded that it fully strengthen and revitalize her with its great power, in Episode Thirteen.; The bone sculptures of Queen Goodfey and King Darius (mother and stepfather to Princess Arkayna and her long-lost twin sister "Proxima") now remain in the throne room of the royal palace.
23	3	"Scream of the Banshee"	Matt Ferguson	Steph Kaliner	Tom Nesbitt; Paul Soeiro	January 27, 2018 (US) April 22, 2018 (CAN)	203	0.05
The Mysticons are hired by Gawayne to guard pop star Lance O'Lovely from a vengeful banshee who possesses unusually strong sound/vocal abilities. Emerald realizes that she has taken Lance to Sound Lair Studios, where Lance had recorded his very first song. The Mysticons arrive, only to see the banshee Vesper "steal" his voice. As Emerald goes after her on Topaz, Arkayna and Zarya see a poster of Vesper in her own band, with Lance as a backup singer. They go and tell Emerald the truth: that Lance is a fraud and that Vesper is the genuine singer. At the concert, Lance uses his magic gold microphone to take the voices of the audience, and grows to gigantic size. Vesper comes to help and Arkayna, Zarya and Piper use their mystical bracers to break the microphone and release everyone's voices. Lance, now shrunk to a smaller size and exposed as the fraud he truly is, runs off. Emerald apologizes to Vesper for letting her idolization of Lance blind from her the true idols. Vesper pleases the audience by putting on her "comeback tour" and dedicating her new song to the Mysticons.
24	4	"The Edge of Two Morrows"	Matt Ferguson	Ashley Lannigan	Ruth Ramirez; Greg Collinson	February 3, 2018 (US) April 22, 2018 (CAN)	204	0.07
Fed up with having to constantly save the entire realm of Gemina as Mysticon Striker, an overwhelmed and stressful Piper wishes upon a gold coin that reverses all of time to before she, Zarya, Emerald, and Princess Arkayna were chosen as the second generation of legendary Mysticons.
25	5	"Twin Stars Unite"	Matt Ferguson	Sean Jara	Tom Nesbitt; Paul Soeiro	February 10, 2018 (US) April 29, 2018 (CAN)	205	0.05
Tazma has arrived in Arizona, Earth, and uses her advanced shadow magic to incapacitate her own Auntie Yaga and abduct Proxima. With the youngest royal twin of Gemina now in her hands, Necrafa intends to use her in order to put her master plan into action. With the impending annihilation of Gemina close at hand, the Mysticons formulate a plan to rescue her. However, the Queen of the Undead reveals a new twist to her plan for the Princess Twins of Gemina reunion, to result in the emergence of the spectral beast. Posing as an unconscious Proxima, Necrafa is able to trick Arkayna into revealing her identity. She and Proxima are captured and the ritual to awaken the Spectral Dragon begins, but to everyone's shock, it does not work. Necrafa takes Tazma away to have her fix the device, while Piper and Em are able to rescue Arkayna, Zarya and Proxima. While recovering, Zarya and Arkayna both accidentally touch the device simultaneously, causing it to suddenly activate and release the Spectral Dragon, revealing that Proxima was never Princess Arkayna's long-lost twin in the first place but was, in fact, Zarya Moonwolf all along.
26	6	"The Dragon's Rage"	Matt Ferguson	Grant Sauvé	Ruth Ramirez; Greg Collinson	February 17, 2018 (US) April 29, 2018 (CAN)	206	0.06
Nova Terron realizes (and was unaware) that Mrs. Sparklebottom, who was ordered to protect Zarya's true identity, swapped her with another orphaned baby girl, Proxima, who leaves in tears that her entire history had been nothing more than a fabrication. Arkayna and Zarya go in search of an ancient and mighty weapon, two mysterious rings, to stop Necrafa and the Spectral Dragon before the entire realm of Gemina is no more. Dreadbane appears at the last moment and steals the rings, intent on delivering them to Necrafa. Meanwhile, Emerald and Piper try to fend them off, with the aid of Nova Terron and his fellow Astromancers. Tazma attempts to convince Proxima to join her side, due to the everyone deceiving and lying to her. Proxima refuses, but does not forgive Nova Terron for his part in deceiving her about her family history. Princess Arkayna convinces Dreadbane not to blindly follow his one-sided love for Necrafa and he surrenders the rings to Arkayna. She and Zarya use them to "Unleash the Twin Dragon" successfully obliterating the Spectral Dragon, Queen Necrafa and her undead army all at once. However, only a piece of her evil-powered mask remains.: Princess Arkayna quickly gets over the fact of Proxima having never being her long-lost twin sister and happily accepts Zarya as her family; unaware that her obliviousness has deeply affected Proxima.
27	7	"The Mask"	Matt Ferguson	Ashley Lannigan	Andrew Tan; Tom Nesbitt	February 24, 2018 (US) May 6, 2018 (CAN)	207	0.03
The Mysticons and Proxima go on an undersea quest to destroy Queen Necrafa's broken mask by hurling it right into the fiery core of the Rift of Ruin; a volcanic trench that is located in the deepest depths of the sea. Proxima is tasked with guarding the fragment with her very life. On the surface, Malvaron attempts to coerce his elder sister Tazma into returning with them as an Astromancer, who has secluded herself within the Spectral Hand's lair, with help from Doug and Choko. In the depths of the sea, the Mysticons and Proxima meet up with Queen Truefin and Princess Kelpie again. Emerald had used her Silver Trident to call them to her. Queen Truefin ensures their survival underwater by using her Silver Trident to give the Mysticons mermaid fish tails and octopus tentacles for Proxima, much to her surprise. Although the way to the Rift, Arkayna tries to comfort Proxima about not being her twin sister by assuring her that she will always think of her as her sister, even though they are not related by blood. Proxima, however, remains serious and distant towards her. It is then that the fragment of Queen Necrafa's mask works its dark magic by taking possession of Kelpie's mind and forcing her to take it. Zarya and Piper subdue her and Proxima blasts the young mermaid warrior-princess with an unusually strong energy beam of pure star magic, claiming that she was merely trying to stop her. Trouble soon looms when several Jellyfey, who are longtime sown enemies of the Mer-Knights of the Silver Trident, emerge. The Mysticons, Proxima and their mermaid friends take shelter in a clam. Arkayna urges all to move faster, as they must destroy the mask fragment quickly. Zarya admits her misgivings about Proxima's longtime contact with it, to which her long-lost twin replies that she thinks that Proxima is just trying to do the right thing. In the lair of the Spectral Hand, Malvaron is caught and taken to the throne room, where Tazma is stating her regrets at failing to stop the Mysticons from destroying "her queen." Indignant, Malvaron wonders as to why Tazma had fallen for Necrafa's evil charms so easily. Tazma admits that he had been a constant source of irritation for her. In turn, Malvaron admits that, as his elder sister, he had always looked up to her. Tazma disregards this sentiment and is about to blast her younger brother to nothing, but it interrupted by the arrival of Doug and Choko who use a shrinking potion to enable Malvaron to take her back with them, while the entire lair is being destroyed by a meteor shower created by Nova Terron and his top-level Astromancer students. Meanwhile, back underwater, the Mysticons and Proxima are in pursuit of Queen Truefin who has been corrupted by the evil power of the mask fragment. Princess Arkayna urges Proxima to destroy the Mask by hurling it into the Rift, as she, Kelpie, Emerald, Zarya and Piper fend off the Jellyfey. Proxima throws "the mask" into the fiery core of the Rift of Ruin itself; forever riding the realm of Necrafa's evil. Zarya and Princess Arkayna apologize for doubting her, which Proxima claims to accept. However, as the Mysticons celebrate their victory in a game of tag, Proxima reveals to have hidden the genuine mask fragment in a small kelp plant, with which she fully intends to use on her new path of revenge; to get even with Nova Terron and the Mysticons for deceiving her about her family history. Chuckling wickedly to herself, her eyes glow red as an indication of the mask's fragment hold over her.: This is the only episode that Emerald does not use the mystic Knight Star Sword, as she uses her silver trident.; This marks the second appearance of Queen Truefin and her young daughter Princess Kelpie.
28	8	"Save the Date!"	Matt Ferguson	Grant Sauvé	Greg Collinson; Paul Soeiro	April 21, 2018 (US) May 6, 2018 (CAN)	208	0.07
Malvaron and Princess Arkayna's very first date is ruined by the sudden arrival of a crazy makeup monster called "Oozie Q"; a side effect of a potion Princess Arkayna had accidentally messed up earlier. Meanwhile, Tazma manages to escape from her snow-globe prison by tricking Doug.: The budding romance between Princess Arkayna and Malvaron is fully expressed in the form a kiss on the forehead.
29	9	"Happily Never After"	Matt Ferguson	Jocelyn Geddie	James Caswell; Paul Soeiro	April 28, 2018 (US) May 13, 2018 (CAN)	209	0.09
Having donned the fragment of Necrafa's mask and allowing its dark power to consume her, Proxima breaks into the Astromancer Academy, where she snatches the powerless Dragon Disk from her old star master, and turns all of the other top Astromancers into her mindless minions: Spectromancers and commands them to kneel before her while she corrupts the Dragon Disk with her greater, darker star magic; turning the ancient artifact from a bright gold to blood-red. At the Stronghold, Malvaron informs a shocked Princess Arkayna and the others of Proxima's dark and vengeful path and head out to stop her from creating her very own Codex. Upon arriving, the Mysticons meet the slug-like male librarian who ends up trapping them and Proxima inside his new story. This turns Princess Arkayna, Piper, Zarya and Choko into dwarves (except for Emerald who is a dwarf naturally), without their magical abilities and weapons. A vindictive Proxima escapes and is on her way to the top of the palace tower, where a bookmark-shaped portal is, allowing access to the real world. She succeeds and takes over the story herself, imprisoning the librarian within its pages as well. He and the girls use a bookworm to return to the real world and transform into their respective Mysticon uniforms. Arkayna tries to talk sense into Proxima, who pushes her further away and escapes with a small bottle of starfire ink. Zarya assures Arkayna that they will do everything in their power to save her. In the Star Chamber, Proxima has her Spectromancers utilize the starfire ink to enable her to successfully make her very own Codex, which is far more powerful than its counterpart, now fully drained. She calls upon the silhouettes of four dark, female warriors whom she calls "her children."
30	10	"The Lost Scepter"	Matt Ferguson	Steph Kaliner	Tom Nesbitt; Kerry Sargent; Greg Collinson; Ruth Ramirez; Noel Tuazon; Frank Lintzens	May 5, 2018 (US) May 13, 2018 (CAN)	210	0.08
The Mysticons race against the devious Vexicons to retrieve an ancient and immensely powerful scepter that had belonged to a lazy childlike king thousands of years ago, which gives its wielder mind-control over everyone in the realm. Zarya is left to watch her stepbrother Gawayne at the Stronghold, much to her annoyance and chagrin, while Arkayna the others try to work out the riddle left by former tyrannical child King Lorious the Glorious to find his scepter before the Vexicons do.: Zarya meets the bone statue of her birth mother, Queen Goodfey, for the first time.; Acting King Gawayne is now aware of Zarya being his younger fraternal twin stepsister.; The Vexicons are equipped with animal bracers to counteract those wielded by the Mysticons- blueSnake, orange Panther, purple Bat and pink Basilisk.
31	11	"Total Eclipse of the Golden Heart"	Matt Ferguson	Ashley Lannigan; Jocelyn Geddie	Ruth Ramirez; Tom Nesbitt	May 12, 2018 (US) July 8, 2018 (CAN)	211	0.08
Emerald's overprotective mother comes for a surprise visit, but has no idea that her daughter is the legendary Mysticon Knight. As Emerald and Citrine have a mother-daughter outing, Arkayna, Zarya and Piper try to deal with a maleficent eclipse that strengthens dark creatures and send into a vicious frenzy. While Emerald shows her mother around Drake City, Arkayna, Zarya and Piper try to keep her from witnessing anything evil and dangerous, which proves a difficult task. Especially with the eclipse looming nearer.: This marks the third appearance of Emerald's mother Citrine Goldenbraid. Her father Malachite and younger twin brothers, Halite and Ferrus are mentioned.
32	12	"The Last Dragon"	Matt Ferguson	Grant Sauvé	Greg Collinson; Paul Soeiro	May 19, 2018 (US) July 8, 2018 (CAN)	212	0.06
The Mysticons encounter an infant dragon and decide to protect it, but Arkayna and Zarya have different ideas as to what protecting such a creature would really mean. They name her Stormy, being a storm dragon that can control thunder and lightning. Unfortunately, she is found by Gawayne who uses her as his personal pet to make him look good to the public. Stormy is freaked by the crowd and causes a minor thunderstorm and shower, thus discovering her dragon abilities. The Mysticons go after her while Gawayne hires a bounty-hunter called "the Claw" to retrieve Stormy. At the Stronghold, Zarya is determined to reunite Stormy with her family, but Arkayna reminds her twin that Dragonhenge was where the final battle took place, that thousands of dragons had fallen. As the Dragon Mage, Arkayna declares herself as the only family Stormy has left. At night, Zarya sneaks Stormy out and heads off on Archer to Dragonhenge. She is later approached by "the Claw" revealed to be a girl known as "Clawdette." She is subdued by Arkayna, Piper and Emerald. Arkayna chastises Zarya for exposing Stormy to more danger. Zarya reminds her that she should know what it's like to be an orphan as their mother and stepfather had been turned to solid bone, which was somewhat similar to being gone. Arkayna agrees to see this through, and the Mysticons go to the place where the Dragons of Light, King Valmok and Queen Arathua, made their last stand. Unfortunately, Clawdette manages to capture Stormy and infuriate Zarya since Stormy is the last dragon. Back at Drake City, the Mysticons find Stormy using her storm powers to attack everything and everyone. But fortunately, with the unexpected aid of Clawdette, they recover Stormy and calm her down. The mysterious panhandler suddenly appears who reveals himself as the long-lost dragon king Valmok himself. He takes Stormy to a secret cave in Dragonhenge, and reveals the rest of the intact dragon eggs as they all begin to glow bright and probably hatch.
33	13	"Game of Phones"	Matt Ferguson	Corey Liu	Kerry Sargent; Michelle Ku	May 19, 2018 (US) July 15, 2018 (CAN)	213	0.06
Zarya's addiction to video games turn catastrophic when a spell cast by Mallory, leader of the Vexicons, suddenly traps her inside her new video game. Proxima takes on the form of Zarya to get close enough to put an end to Arkayna during the Sky Lancers Festival.: The Mysticons reveal their identities to the citizens of Drake City.
34	14	"The Foz Who Saved Lotus Night"	Matt Ferguson	Ashley Lannigan	Greg Collinson; Paul Soeiro	July 15, 2018 (CAN) August 4, 2018 (US)	214	0.08
Furious that she was not given a gift for Lotus Night, Deeva uses the Mysticons miniature Celestial Forge to make zombie dust to turn thoughtless Mallory into a zombie in retaliation. Unfortunately, her plan goes awry and infects her instead and then everybody else in Drake City, one by one. Arkayna and Zarya are doing last-minute shopping to get one another "the perfect gift" as it is their very first Lotus Night as twin sisters. When the Mysticons learn of the zombie infestation, they make an antidote which they plan to use for the fireworks and revert everyone back to normal. Soon each Mysticon is gradually turned into a mindless zombie, leaving Choko to put the glitter dust into the fireworks machine. In the royal palace, he runs into Gawayne who had just slept late and is zombified by his butler. Choko uses a mage hover board, which Arkayna intended to give to Zarya, to elude the zombie Vexicons and Proxima. Just as he is about to put in the orb-shaped glitter antidote, Deeva turns him a zombie. Fortunately, his tail pushes in the orb which successfully turns everyone back to normal. Proxima leaves with her Vexicons, telling the Mysticons to "enjoy the peace while it lasts" and has Willia teleport her and her fellow Vexicons away.: This is the very first episode to be narrated by supporting character Barnabas Dinklelot.
35	15	"Heart of Stone"	Matt Ferguson	Steph Kaliner	Ruth Ramirez; Tom Nesbitt	August 11, 2018 (US) September 9, 2018 (CAN)	215	0.08
When the Vexicons leave behind Eartha after ditching a battle in the Undercity, the Mysticons take her to the Stronghold as their prisoner, where they see that her core is cracked, which means that she does not have much time, as Proxima had created the Vexicons to be a "sisterhood of evil." Once shattered, Eartha will crumble into nothing. Emerald decides to give Eartha a brand-new heart, full of Mysticon goodness by taking her to the mines of the Jewel of the North, her hometown. They meet up with Emerald's parents, Citirine and Malachite Goldenbraid, who welcome them back into their cottage home. Halite and Ferrus are overexcited about their older sister being a Mysticon and insist that she show her Knight form to them. Outside, Eartha is getting restless and intends to rejoin her sisters. In the Star Chamber, the other three Vexicons give Proxima the supercharged rods they had acquired in the Undercity. Proxima is outraged that Eartha had been left behind. It is then that the eye of Necrafa's mask glows red and Proxima's voice distorts, and demands that Mallory, Kasha and Willa go to find Eartha, as they should never leave a sister behind. In the dwarven mines, Emerald and the other three Mysticons lead Eartha to a mystical forge, from which they will replenish her new heart. The Goldenbraids and several other dwarfs suddenly arrive, believing that all golem life-forms are evil through and through. Eartha proves otherwise when she saves Halite and Ferrus from being crushed by the mine's rockfall. When Mallory, Kasha and Willa arrive, the Mysticons try to defend Eartha and assure her that they will not force her to accept her new heart of goodness; that it is her choice alone. Eartha apologizes to Emerald, stating that she was not the golem she had thought she was and leaves with her three sisters. In the Forge Room, Proxima restores Eartha's heart to her, to which Mallory demands that Eartha never betray the sisterhood again. They leave Eartha and Proxima, as Mallory wants to see Drake City's Got Talent. Proxima assures Eartha that the Mysticons had also made her feel like she had belonged, but that it was all lies; therefore she intends to make them pay dearly. Eartha puts the supercharged rods in the Forge, from which a circular, ancient and even darker object is created. Eartha then notices that her core is glowing with a warm yellow light.
36	16	"Monster Hunt"	Matt Ferguson	Tally Knoll	Kerry Sargent; Steve Remen	August 18, 2018 (US) September 9, 2018 (CAN)	216	0.11
When Zarya chooses hanging out with her twin sister and Emerald over their annual champing trip, Piper makes up a story about a monster. But she later discovers the monster is real and not vicious. Meanwhile, Mallory, Kasha and Willa go to find ingredients to break the protective orb Proxima had put around the half of Necrafa's evil mask (no longer wanting to controlled by its intense evil, as she merely desired vengeance on Princess Arkayna for betraying and abandoning her for Zarya so easily, but never utter annihilation of Gemina), as Mallory wants its dark powers for herself. Her plan backfires badly as the Mask fragment floats back to Proxima and takes full possession of her troubled mind and body. It is then that a deep, distorted female voice is heard, declaring that it has been reborn for one purpose only: To destroy the entire realm of Gemina! Exactly what it intends to do through Proxima.: Chronologically, this episode takes place some moments before "Eternal Starshine of the Mage's Mind."
37	17	"The Princess and the Pirate"	Matt Ferguson	Sean Jara	Greg Collinson; Tom Nesbitt; Kerry Sargent	August 25, 2018 (US) September 16, 2018 (CAN)	217	0.08
Zarya and Kitty find themselves in over their heads when they unearth an ancient yet powerful elven treasure that was never meant to be discovered. The mystic prism inside awakens a sinister, monstrous creature from the astral plane called "the Marauder" by the ancient Moon Elves that have kept it at bay for centuries. Kitty corrects her mistake by helping Zarya and the other Mysticons send it back through the portal from whence it came. She and her fellow sky pirates then decide to join the moon elves on their quest to keep any further monsters from outside the realm of Gemina from escaping.
38	18	"Eternal Starshine of the Mage's Mind"	Matt Ferguson	Jocelyn Geddie	Kirk Jorgensen; Paul Soeiro	September 1, 2018 (US) (Note: This episode was first aired on Nicktoons in the United Kingdom on August 29, 2018.) September 16, 2018 (CAN)	218	0.08
With Tazma's "help", the Mysticons enter the deepest corners of Proxima's subconscious mind to sever the incredibly strong hold the fragment of Necrafa's mask now has over her. Throughout their mental journey, the Mysticons learn about Proxima's lonely childhood, with Princess Arkayna seeing for herself just how oblivious and horrible a person she had been all along to Proxima, as being the Princess' long-lost twin sister had meant so much to her; that such a personal betrayal and rejection are what drove the unloved and unwanted orphan star mage to accept the Mask's aid in getting even with her. At the same time, the Vexicons have chosen rebellion as the ambitious Mallory covets the dark powers of the ancient Mask, which totally warps her mind and partially alters her looks, to the concern and uncertainty of her three sisters whom she calls "minions.": The title is a play of the 2004 movie Eternal Sunshine of the Spotless Mind.
39	19	"Fear the Spectral Hand"	Matt Ferguson	Grant Sauvé	Greg Collinson; Kerry Sargent; Tom Nesbitt; Kirk Jorgenson	September 8, 2018 (US) (Note: This episode was first aired on Nicktoons in the United Kingdom on August 30, 2018.) September 23, 2018 (CAN)	219	0.08
With a power-mad Mallory now under the dark influence of Queen Necrafa's mask fragment, the Mysticons and the fully reformed Proxima turn to the unlikeliest of allies to put an end to the Vexicons and the Spectral Hand itself once and for all. Princess Arkayna and Zarya's mother and stepfather are finally fully restored to living flesh and blood at long last, after many months of petrification, by none other than a reformed Dreadbane who sacrifices himself to bring them back. Queen Goodfey reunites with Princess Arkayna who introduces her to Zarya Moonwolf, the younger twin daughter she never knew she had, which naturally surprises her when the purple-haired, green-eyed girl addresses her as "Mom" and not "Your Highness." The true mastermind is revealed to be the Spectral Hand itself, having manipulated and tempted many with its ancient and powerful dark magics- Queen Necrafa (who was originally a top-level elf sorceress), Dreadbane, Captain Kaos and taking advantage of Proxima's deeper feelings of abandonment, loneliness and betrayal towards Princess Arkayna for leaving her.
40	20	"Age of Dragons"	Matt Ferguson	Sean Jara	Greg Collinson; Ruth Ramirez; Kerry Sargent	September 15, 2018 (US) (Note: This episode was first aired on Nicktoons in the United Kingdom on August 31, 2018.) September 23, 2018 (CAN)	220	0.09
The Mysticons, Proxima and their allies face-off against the Vexicons for one final showdown to defend the realm of Gemina. With an ancient, magical sky lance the Mysticons have their green Dragon, yellow Phoenix, blue Wolf and pink Unicorn Bracers temporarily strengthened. This enables them to best the Vexicons and completely obliterate the Spectral Hand from the plane of existence in one single strike. With the greatest evil force known to Planet Gemina finally obliterated since the fall of the original Mysticons one millennium ago, everyone celebrates, with Queen Goodfey apologizing to Princess Arkayna for not taking into account how Zarya being back into her life would affect her eldest twin daughter, and the three embrace loving. Mallory, Kasha, Willa and a caged Deeva are imprisoned for their crimes against the realm, whereas Eartha fully accepts her good heart and stays with Emerald in Ruddix Hollow, Nova Terron resigns as Star Master of the Astromancer Academy and gives the honor to Proxima Starfall as "Star Mistress" as compensation for his unknowing hand in her life being affected by him fifteen years ago, as he reconciles with his longtime girlfriend/starmate Geraldine. Queen Goodfey and King Darius resume their royal duties as monarchs of all of Planet Gemina, and the second generation of legendary Mysticons continue their never-ending heroic deeds to further bring peace and justice to the realm aloft with their new dragon mounts.: This is to be followed by a series of ongoing graphic novels, three-to-four chapter books, and even a feature film.
