= Grasshopper (mobile app) =

Mobile software application

- Developer: Google
- Initial release: 20 June 2017; 8 years ago
- Operating system: Android, iOS
- Website: learn.grasshopper.app at the Wayback Machine (archived 2021-03-04)

Grasshopper was an app developed by Google that taught users to code with JavaScript. Available for IOS and Android operating systems, the program had aimed to teach with small "bite-size" coding lessons. The program got harder as it progressed, and upon finishing the program, the user was given a certificate of completion. Assessments were not required to gain the certificate of completion. Grasshopper mobile was released in 2017.

In March 2023, Google announced that Grasshopper would shut down on June 15, 2023.
