= Lisa Hopp =

Lisa Hopp (born October 21, 1956) is Dean and Professor of nursing at Purdue University Northwest. She founded and directs the Indiana Center for Evidence-Based Nursing Practice: A Center of Excellence of The Joanna Briggs Institute.

== Education ==
Hopp was born in Sioux City, Iowa but grew up in nearby Moville, Iowa. She graduated with a BA in French from Grinnell College in 1978, a BSN in Nursing from Rush University in 1979, a MS from the Clinical Nurse Specialist Program at University of Illinois at Chicago in 1988 and a Ph.D. in Nursing from University of Illinois at Chicago in 1992.

== Teaching ==
Hopp, a Purdue Northwest teacher of the year award winner, has adapted video, video conferencing, and distance learning technologies such as interactive learning objects and podcasting to her courses. She won a Purdue Curriculum Innovation grant on the uses of podcasting and has presented on evidence based practice, innovative teaching strategies, and technology integration at international and national conferences. In 2014, she was appointed Interim Dean of the College of Purdue Northwest and now serves as the Dean of the College of Nursing after formal appointment in 2016.

== Honors ==
- 2012 Fellow, American Academy of Nursing
- 2005 National Association of Clinical Nurse Specialist Susan B. Davidson Service Award
- 2002 Outstanding Teacher of the Year Purdue University Calumet
- 1984 American Nurses Association: Medical-Surgical Nurse of the Year

== Bibliography ==
- Hopp, Lisa (2006). "Talk to Me About Evidence-based Practice!". AACN Advanced Critical Care. 17 (3): 250–2. doi:10.1097/01256961-200607000-00004. PMID 16931920.
- Hopp, Lisa (2005). "Minding the Gap". Clinical Nurse Specialist. 19 (4): 190–2. doi:10.1097/00002800-200507000-00009. PMID 16027547.
- Hopp, Lisa Jo; Kim, Mi Ja; Larson, Janet L.; Sharp, John T. (1996). "Incremental Threshold Loading in Patients with Chronic Obstructive Pulmonary Disease". Nursing Research. 45 (4): 196–202. doi:10.1097/00006199-199607000-00002. PMID 8700652.
- Nursing management of adults with upper airway disorders (1994, 1997). In Beare, P. and Meyers, J. (eds.). Principles and Practice of Adult Health Nursing. Mosby: St. Louis.
- Smith, N. Z., Larson, J. L. & Hopp, L. J. (1993). Maximal inspiratory pressure: The effects of a brief warm-up. Rehabilitation Nursing Research, Spring, 3–9.
- Hopp, L. J. (1992). Incremental threshold loading in chronic obstructive pulmonary disease. Unpublished doctoral dissertation, University of Illinois at Chicago.
- Hopp, L. J. (1989). Viral Myocarditis: A case study. In Groer, M. W. & Shekleton, M. E. Basic Pathophysiology: A Holistic Approach. C.V. Mosby: St. Louis.
