= HMS Grasshopper =

Eight vessels and one shore station of the Royal Navy were named HMS Grasshopper, named for the grasshopper, a common type of herbivorous insect.

- HMS Grasshopper (1776) was a 14-gun sloop. She was renamed HMS Basilisk in 1779 and converted to a fireship; Basilisk was sold in 1783.
- HMS Grasshopper (1806) was a Cruizer-class brig-sloop launched in 1806 and stranded at Texel on Christmas Day 1811. She was captured the next day and taken into Dutch service as Irene until she was broken up in 1822.
- HMS Grasshopper (1813) was the second Cruizer-class brig-sloop of that name; launched in 1813, she was converted to a ship-sloop in 1822 and sold in 1832. She then became a whaler in the British Southern Whale Fisheries, making four voyages between 1832 and 1847.
- HMS Grasshopper (1856) was a Albacore-class gunboat, launched at North fleet in 1856 and sold at Newchang in 1871.
- HMS Grasshopper (1887) was a Grasshopper-class torpedo gunboat built in 1887 at Sheerness Dockyard and sold in 1905.
- HMS Grasshopper was to have been the name of a Cricket-class coastal destroyer (later downgraded to first-class torpedo boat), but before launch in 1907 she was renamed Torpedo Boat Number 9. She was lost in July 1916 in a collision in the North Sea.
- HMS Grasshopper (1909) was a Beagle-class destroyer, launched at Fairfield in 1909, that served in the Gallipoli Campaign. She was sold for breaking up on 1 November 1921.
- HMS Grasshopper (T85) was a Dragonfly-class river gunboat. She was launched in 1938 and sunk, together with her sister-ship HMS Dragonfly, by Japanese forces south of Singapore on 14 February 1942 with heavy loss of life.
- HMS Grasshopper was the name of the Royal Navy base at Weymouth, Dorset during World War II.
