= Heritage Operations Processing System =

- Product type: Transport Administration & Associated Services
- Current owner: Consortium
- Country: United Kingdom
- Introduced: 2009
- Related brands: Heritage Railway Association
- Markets: United Kingdom, Australia
- Website: hops.org.uk hops.org.au

Heritage Operations Processing System, Heritage Ops, short named HOPS, is a web-based tool for the day-to-day running and management of preserved and heritage railways. The system was developed, from a concept drawn up by Danny Scroggins and Luke Cartey.

== Founding and development ==
The HOPS Project began early in August 2009 in the rostering office of the signalling department at the Gloucestershire Warwickshire Railway – who embraced the use of the technology. Beta testing began in January 2010 with a small group of volunteers, the group being enlarged later that year. After this period, the system was made available to other UK heritage railways in January 2011.

The purpose of the system is to provide administration tools associated with operating functions on heritage railways, such as staff rostering, timetabling, competence management and document control, etc. The system is used to assist railways in meeting the requirements of government legislation such as the Railways and Other Guided Transport Systems (Safety) Regulations 2006 (ROGS), which were introduced in Great Britain to put the 2004 European Railway Safety Directive into practice. The system assists with competency management (as a requirement of the Safety Management System).

The ethos of the development of the system has been that in the majority of cases, producing large-scale data-handling and storage facilities, with the appropriate level of security, access, backups, etc., would not be economical for an individual railway. A single program, in use by many railway companies, however, would make the investment economical.

The system has grown significantly in the five years it has been in development, mainly in response to feedback from users and demands of the industry.
