= Walter Hoppe =

German physicist (1917–1986)

Walter Hoppe (March 21, 1917 – November 3, 1986) was a German physicist and electron microscopist.

Walter Hoppe was born in Wallsee-Sindelburg and obtained his doctorate in chemistry at the German University in Prague under Professor J. Boehm. Hoppe became professor and departmental head at the Max Planck Institute of Biochemistry in Martinsried, Germany from 1964 until his retirement in 1985.

His most important contributions in the 1960s to 1980s were based on his experience with X-ray diffraction and electron microscopy, from which he derived pioneering theories, including the invention of "ptychography". These led to experimental studies of the practicability of performing high resolution three-dimensional reconstructions of complex biological macromolecules which at that time were not able to be assembled into the crystalline arrays necessary for structural determination by X-ray diffraction (e.g. ribosomes). Hoppe's ideas of combining many images of the same specimen (a negatively stained electron microscope preparation containing the object of interest) recorded over a wide range of tilt angles (not necessarily restricted to a simple tilt axis perpendicular to the electron beam), followed by reconstruction of the three-dimensional object via mathematical manipulations involving Fourier space transforms or weighted filtered back projections, constitute the basis of many extant 3D reconstruction techniques, including computer tomography in medicine and internal investigation of materials. He was acutely aware of electron damage causing alteration of the specimen's structure during observation and his studies contributed significantly to the development of minimal dose methodology. Much of his early contribution to the field has been overlooked by other workers since it was published mainly in German language journals. A biographical note appeared in J. Appl. Crystallogr. (1987). 20, 324-325 (see: http://journals.iucr.org/j/issues/1987/04/00/a27772/a27772.pdf).

== Literature ==
- Hoppe, W. (1974) Towards three-dimensional “electron microscopy” at atomic resolution. Naturwissenschaften, 61, No. 6, pp. 239–249.
- Hoppe, W., Schramm, H. J., Sturm, M., Hunsmann, N., and Gaβmann, J. (1976) Three-dimensional electron microscopy of individual biological objects. I. Methods. Z. Naturforsch. 31a, pp. 645–655.
- Hoppe, W., Schramm, H. J., Sturm, M., Hunsmann, N., and Gaβmann, J. (1976) Three-dimensional electron microscopy of individual biological objects. II. Test calculations. Z. Naturforsch. 31a, p. 1370.
- Hoppe, W., Schramm, H. J., Sturm, M., Hunsmann, N., and Gaβmann, J. (1976) Three-dimensional electron microscopy of individual biological objects. III. Experimental results on yeast fatty acid synthetase. Z. Naturforsch. 31a.
- Hoppe, W. and Grill, B. (1976) Prospects of three-dimensional high resolution electron microscopy of non-periodic structures. Ultramicroscopy Vol. 2, 1976–1977, pp. 153–168.
- Radermacher, M. and Hoppe, W. (1978) 3-D reconstruction from conically tilted projections. Proceedings of the 9th International Congress on Electron Microscopy, Vol. 1, pp. 218–219.
- Hoppe W and Hegerl R. (1980) Three-dimensional structure determination by electron microscopy. In: Hawkes PW, editor. Computer Processing of Electron Microscope Images. Springer-Verlag; Heidelberg: 1980. pp. 127–186.
- Hoppe, W. (1983) Electron Diffraction with the Transmission Electron Microscope as a Phase-Determining Diffractometer—From Spatial Frequency Filtering to the Three-Dimensional Structure Analysis of Ribosomes. Angewandte Chemie International Edition in English, Volume 22, Issue 6, pages 456–485.
