= Grasshopper Peak =

Mountain in Washington, United States

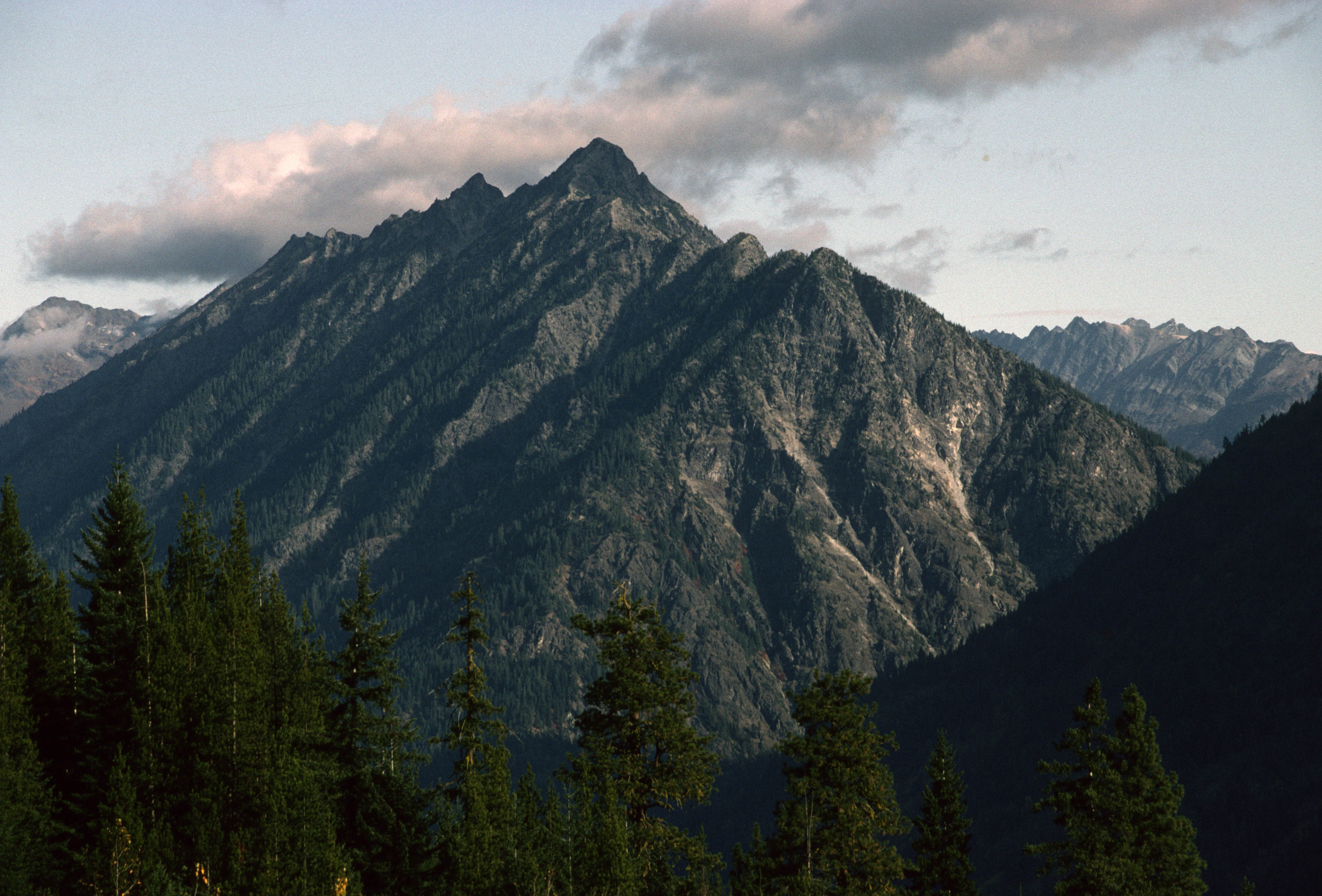
- South aspect

Highest point
- Elevation: 6,850 ft (2,088 m)
- Prominence: 430 ft (131 m)
- Isolation: 2.03 mi (3.27 km)
- Coordinates: 47°57′19″N 120°54′20″W

Geography
- Location within Washington (state) Location within the United States
- Interactive map of Grasshopper Peak
- Country: United States
- State: Washington
- County: Chelan
- Protected area: Glacier Peak Wilderness
- Parent range: Cascade Range; North Cascades; White Mountains
- Topo map: USGS Mount David

Climbing
- Easiest route: Scrambling

Grasshopper Peak is a 6,850-foot-elevation (2,088-meter) mountain summit in Chelan County of Washington state.

== Description ==
Grasshopper Peak is located near the southern end of the White Mountains which are a small subrange of the North Cascades. It is set along the boundary of Glacier Peak Wilderness on land administered by the Okanogan–Wenatchee National Forest. Precipitation runoff from the mountain's west slope drains into the White River, whereas the east slope drains into the Napeequa River. Topographic relief is significant as the summit rises 4,800 feet (1,500 meters) above the White River in 1.35 mile (2.17 km) and 4,320 feet (1,320 meters) above the Napeequa in 0.9 mile (1.45 km). This mountain's toponym has not been officially adopted by the United States Board on Geographic Names, so it is not labelled on USGS maps, and will remain unofficial as long as the USGS policy of not adopting new toponyms in designated wilderness areas remains in effect.

== Climate ==
Grasshopper Peak is located in the marine west coast climate zone of western North America. Most weather fronts originate in the Pacific Ocean and travel east toward the Cascade Mountains. As fronts approach the North Cascades, they are forced upward by the peaks of the Cascade Range, causing them to drop their moisture in the form of rain or snowfall onto the Cascades (Orographic lift). As a result, the west side of the North Cascades experiences high precipitation, especially during the winter months in the form of snowfall. Because of maritime influence, snow tends to be wet and heavy, resulting in high avalanche danger. During winter months, weather is usually cloudy, but due to high pressure systems over the Pacific Ocean that intensify during summer months, there is often little or no cloud cover during the summer. The months July through September offer the most favorable weather for viewing or climbing this peak.

== Geology ==
The North Cascades features some of the most rugged topography in the Cascade Range with craggy peaks, ridges, and deep glacial valleys. Geological events occurring many years ago created the diverse topography and drastic elevation changes over the Cascade Range leading to the various climate differences. These climate differences lead to vegetation variety defining the ecoregions in this area.

The history of the formation of the Cascade Mountains dates back millions of years ago to the late Eocene Epoch. With the North American Plate overriding the Pacific Plate, episodes of volcanic igneous activity persisted. Glacier Peak, a stratovolcano that is 14.3 mi (23.0 km) northwest of Grasshopper Peak, began forming in the mid-Pleistocene. In addition, small fragments of the oceanic and continental lithosphere called terranes created the North Cascades about 50 million years ago.

During the Pleistocene period dating back over two million years ago, glaciation advancing and retreating repeatedly scoured the landscape leaving deposits of rock debris. The U-shaped cross section of the river valleys is a result of recent glaciation. Uplift and faulting in combination with glaciation have been the dominant processes which have created the tall peaks and deep valleys of the North Cascades area.

== See also ==
- Geography of the North Cascades
- Geology of the Pacific Northwest
