= Hans-Joachim Hoppe =

German political scientist

Hans-Joachim Hoppe (born 22 September 1945, Hilden, Germany) is a German political scientist and an expert on Russia and East European affairs.

== Studies ==
He has finished his studies of Russian and East European history, politics and languages with a doctor’s thesis on “German-Bulgarian Relations During the Second World War”. The book has been published in 1979 by the Institut für Zeitgeschichte in Munich Later he took part in projects of the Institut für Zeitgeschichte, Munich, and Institute for Research of Antisemitism, director Wolfgang Benz, Berlin, about the Holocaust, especially the fate of Bulgarian Jews and the Jews in Bulgarian occupied territories (Macedonia and Northern Greece).

== Career ==
From 1976 to 2010 he was head of the Department for German language and East European languages at Volkshochschule Köln - the second largest adult high school in Germany. He has been also for many years a lecturer in the Institute of East European History at Universität Köln.

Numerous essays of him have been published in various political journals and in the reports of the Federal Institute of East European and International Studies in Cologne, now Stiftung Wissenschaft und Politik in Berlin.

Hoppe has been regularly observing the developments in Russia, Eastern Europe, Central Asia and Caucasus. He has also been working on problems of multiculturalism, especially the situation of the Germans, Ukrainians, Russians and other East European communities in the USA and Canada. He has published already an essay on the Ukrainian Canadians. The article has been translated into Russian, published in Liveinternet.ru.

In September 1997 in the final phase of the rule of Yugoslav president Slobodan Milošević Hoppe has been OSCE-election observer during the parliamentary elections in Serbia.

He is member of the Association of Historians specialized on Eastern Europe, member of the German Southeast Europe Society (Südosteuropa-Gesellschaft) as well as the German-Canadian Society (Deutsch-Kanadische Gesellschaft) and the German Canadian Business Club.

== Selected publications ==
- Bulgarien - Hitlers eigenwilliger Verbündeter. Eine Fallstudie zur nationalsozialistischen Südosteuropapolitik (Bulgaria - Hitler’s Self-willing Ally. A Case study on National Socialist Policy Towards South East Europe), edited by Institut für Zeitgeschichte, Munich, dva, Studies On Contemporary History, volume 15, dva, Stuttgart 1979, ISBN 3-421-01904-5.
- Todor Schiwkow - Eine politische Biographie (Todor Zhivkov – a Political Biography), in: Osteuropa (East Europe, a German journal), 5/1978, pp. 399–408.
- Vaclav Klaus - Ministerpräsident der Tschechischen Republik. Ein Porträt (Vaclav Klaus – Prime Minister of the Czech Republic. A Biography), in: Osteuropa, 11/1993, pp. 1083–1087.
- Das Profil der neuen bulgarischen Elite (The Profile of the New Bulgarian Leadership), Berichte des Bundesinstituts für ostwissenschaftliche und internationale Studien (Reports of the Federal Institute for East European and International Studies), 2/1996.
- Das russische IFOR-Kontingent in Bosnien. Eine Reportage (The Russian KFOR-Contingent in Bosnia. A Report), in: Osteuropa-Archiv, 1996, A633-A 637.
- Die russische Balkan-Politik (The Russian Balkan Policy), in: Aussenpolitik (German Foreign Affairs), 1/1998, pp. 44–52.
- Die politische Führung des Milošević-Regimes (The Political Leadership of the Milosevic Regime), Berichte des Bundesinstituts für ostwissenschaftliche und internationale Studien, Köln (Reports of the Federal Institute of Eastern and International Studies, Cologne), No. 26/1999.
- Säson für Könige! Macht das bulgarische Modell Schule? (Season for Kings! Will the Bulgarian Model Set an Precedent?) in: Südosteuropa Mitteilungen, 3/2002, pp. 54–66.

== Internet editions ==
- Russland: Medwedjews Kader (Russia: Medvedev’s Cadres), Deutsche Welle, Fokus Ost-Südost, May 28, 2009.
- Nakhichevan - Azerbaijan's outpost (in German), Eurasisches Magazin, August 2, 2011.
- The Circassians - an unknown people wakes up (in German), Eurasisches Magazin, October 2, 2011.
- Russia on search for a new capital - will the Kremlin be transferred to Siberia? (in German), Eurasisches Magazin, June 2, 2012.
- Tajikistan: Presidential Candidate Bobonazarova Challenges Autocrat Rahmon (in German), Eurasisches Magazin, October 3, 2013.
- Russia will build a bridge across the Kerch Strait (in German), Eurasisches Magazin, March 2, 2014.
- Kyrgyzstan: land of thousand Gods, religious or chaos of religions (in German), Eurasisches Magazin, June 15, 2014.
- Vietnam: Ho Chi Minh's herits would like to join in Putin's Eurasian Economic Union (in German), Eurasisches Magazin, August 6, 2014.
- Ukraine's conflict and the Ukrainian diaspora in Canada, Kyiv Post, September 5, 2015.
- Konflikt na Ukrainie, a diaspora ukraińska w Kanadzie (in Polish translation), Portal Geopolityka.org, 29 grudzień 2015.
- Russland: Putins Junge Armee (in German), Eurasisches Magazin, August 30, 2016.
