= Hopping Hill =

Area of Milford, Derbyshire, England

Coordinates: 53.006°N 1.480°W

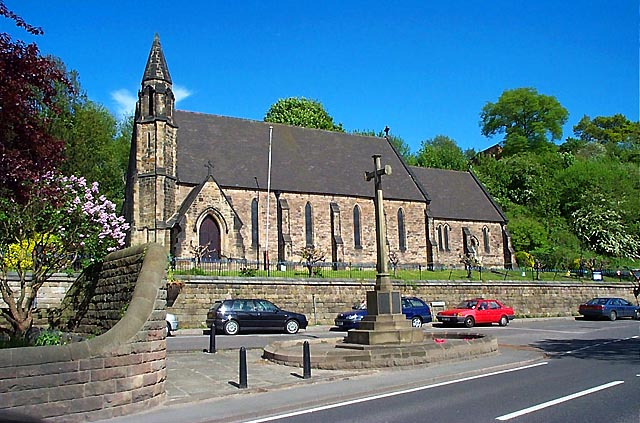
- Holy Trinity Church & War Memorial.

- Location within Derbyshire
- OS grid reference: SK349455
- District: Amber Valley
- Shire county: Derbyshire
- Region: East Midlands
- Country: England
- Sovereign state: United Kingdom
- Post town: BELPER
- Postcode district: DE56
- Police: Derbyshire
- Fire: Derbyshire
- Ambulance: East Midlands

Hopping Hill is an area in Milford, Derbyshire, England. It consists mainly of 19th century terraced housing, built by the Strutt family to house workers from the local cotton mills. Between February 1793 and November 1974, Strutts had constructed about 60 houses for their factory workers.

The church of Holy Trinity and the War Memorial are at the junction of Hopping Hill and the A6 road. It is in the town of Belper.
