= Mount Hopper =

Mountain in Washington, USA

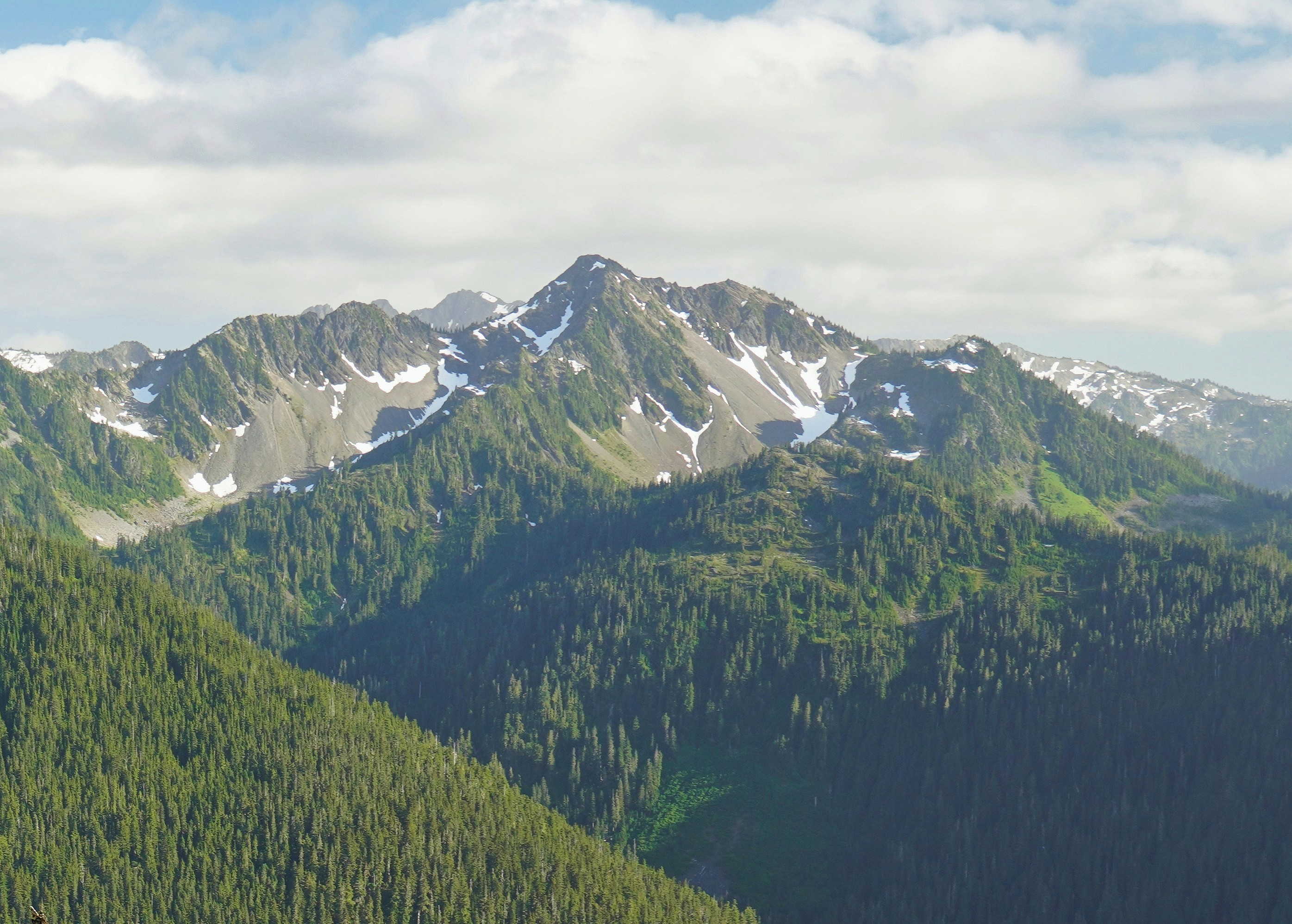
- North aspect

Highest point
- Elevation: 6,120 ft (1,865 m)
- Prominence: 1,060 ft (323 m)
- Parent peak: Mount Stone (6,612 ft)
- Isolation: 1.96 mi (3.15 km)
- Coordinates: 47°37′46″N 123°17′48″W

Geography
- Location within Washington (state) Location within the United States
- Country: United States
- State: Washington
- County: Jefferson
- Protected area: Olympic National Park; Daniel J. Evans Wilderness
- Parent range: Olympic Mountains
- Topo map: USGS Mount Steel

Geology
- Rock age: Eocene

Climbing
- Easiest route: class 2

Mount Hopper is a 6,120-foot-elevation (1,865-meter) mountain summit located in the Olympic Mountains, in Jefferson County of Washington state. It is situated in Olympic National Park and the Daniel J. Evans Wilderness. Precipitation runoff from the mountain drains south into the North Fork Skokomish River, and north into the Duckabush River. Topographic relief is significant as the summit rises over 3,700 feet (1,128 m) above the North Fork Skokomish River in 1.65 mi (2.66 km), and 2,320 feet (707 m) above Crazy Creek in one mile (1.6 km). The nearest higher neighbor is Mount Steel, 1.96 mi (3.15 km) to the west-northwest.

== Climate ==
Mount Hopper is located in the marine west coast climate zone of western North America. Weather fronts originating in the Pacific Ocean travel northeast toward the Olympic Mountains. As fronts approach, they are forced upward by the peaks (orographic lift), causing them to drop their moisture in the form of rain or snow. As a result, the Olympics experience high precipitation, especially during the winter months in the form of snowfall. Because of maritime influence, snow tends to be wet and heavy, resulting in avalanche danger. During winter months weather is usually cloudy, but due to high pressure systems over the Pacific Ocean that intensify during summer months, there is often little or no cloud cover during the summer.

== History ==
The mountain's toponym has been officially adopted by the U.S. Board on Geographic Names, and it is named after brothers Stanley and Roland Hopper. They were remittance men whose father was the second president of the Singer Sewing Machine Company. The brothers spent summers camped near this mountain which bears their name, and in the 1890s homesteaded near Lake Cushman where they were well-known hunting guides. Stanley Hopper was also a member of the group led by William Gladstone Steel which climbed Mount Steel on August 24, 1906.

== Geology ==
The Olympic Mountains are composed of obducted clastic wedge material and oceanic crust, primarily Eocene sandstone, turbidite, and basaltic oceanic crust. The mountains were sculpted during the Pleistocene era by erosion and glaciers advancing and retreating multiple times.

== See also ==
- Geology of the Pacific Northwest
- Olympic Mountains
