= Oscar Hoppe =

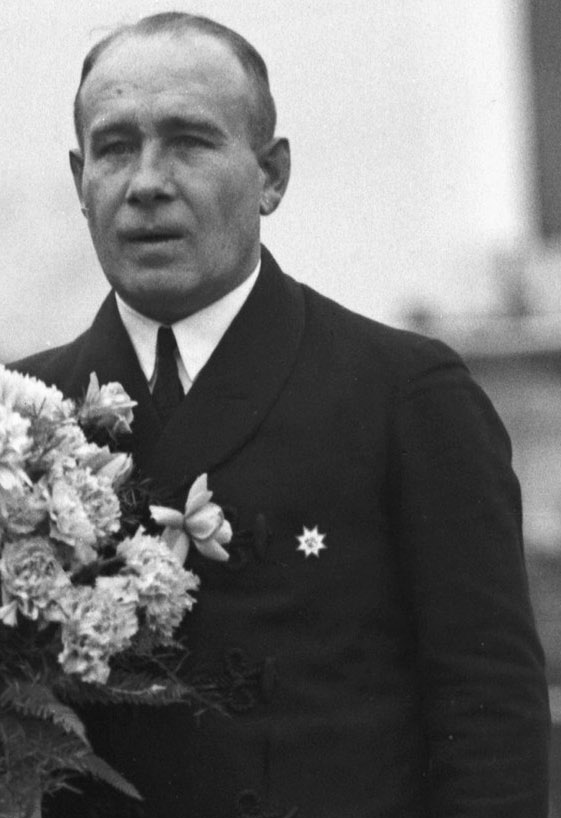
- Hoppe in 1930

Personal information
- Born: 11 June 1886 Troppau, Austrian Silesia, Austria-Hungary
- Died: 19 January 1936 (aged 49) Opava, Czechoslovakia

Figure skating career
- Country: Germany; Czechoslovakia
Medal record
Figure skating: Pairs
Representing Czechoslovakia
World Championships
Bronze medal – third place	1927 Vienna	Pairs

Oscar Hoppe (11 June 1886 – 19 January 1936) was a figure skater who competed in men's singles and pair skating. First he represented the German Empire, then Czechoslovakia. He was born and died in Opava.

With his wife Else Hoppe, he won the bronze medal at the 1927 World Figure Skating Championships in Vienna.

== Competitive highlights ==
=== Pairs ===
With Else Hoppe

Event	1925	1926	1927	1928	1929	1930	1931
World Championships	5th	7th	3rd		6th		6th
European Championships						7th	
