= Else Hoppe =

Czechoslovak figure skater (born 1900)

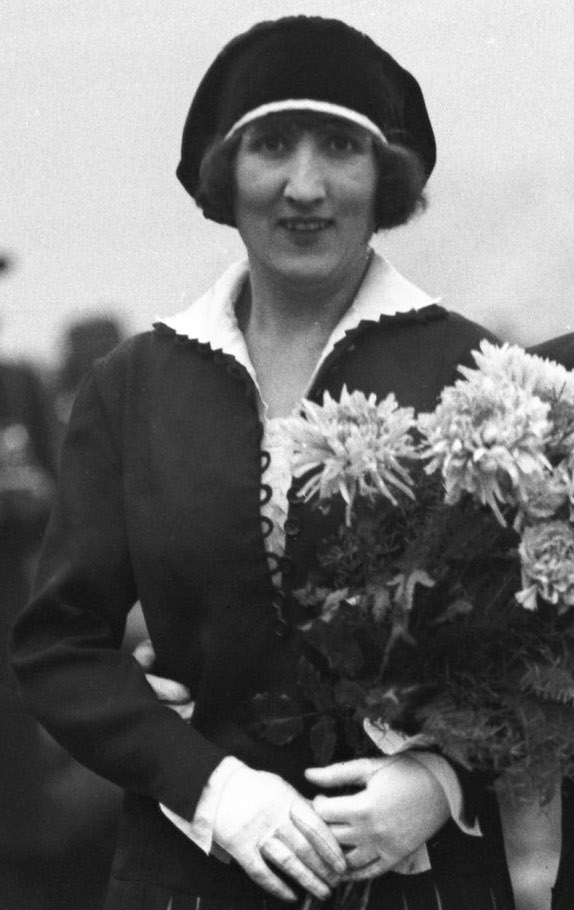
- Hoppe in 1930

Figure skating career
- Country: Czechoslovakia
Medal record
Representing Czechoslovakia
Figure skating: Pairs
World Championships
Bronze medal – third place	1927 Vienna	Pairs

Else Hoppe was a figure skater who competed in pair skating for Czechoslovakia.

With her husband Oscar Hoppe, she won the bronze medal at the 1927 World Figure Skating Championships in Vienna.

== Competitive highlights ==
With Oscar Hoppe

Event	1925	1926	1927	1928	1929	1930	1931
World Championships	5th	7th	3rd		6th		6th
European Championships						7th	
