= USS Hopping =

Buckley-class destroyer escort

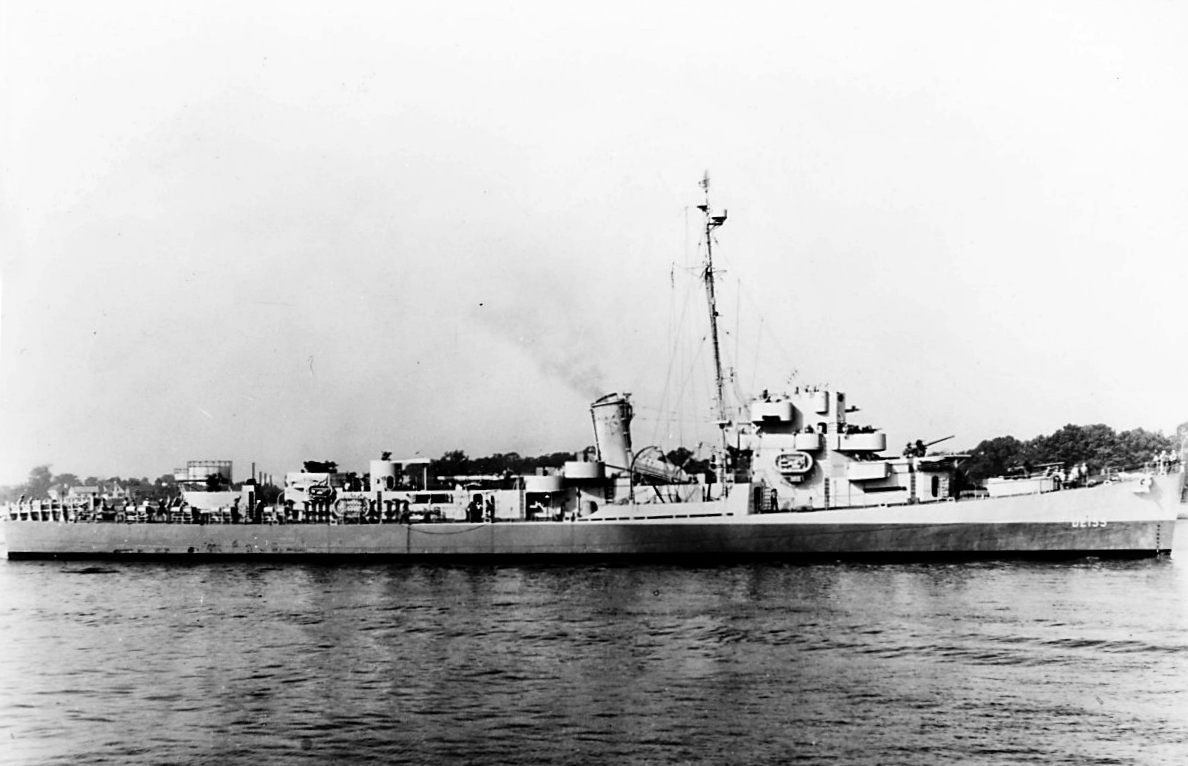

History

United States
- Name: USS Hopping
- Namesake: Hallsted L. Hopping
- Ordered: 1942
- Builder: Norfolk Navy Yard, Portsmouth, Virginia
- Laid down: 15 December 1942
- Launched: 9 March 1943
- Commissioned: 21 May 1943
- Decommissioned: 5 May 1947
- Reclassified: APD-51, 7 September 1944
- Stricken: 1 September 1964
- Honors and awards: 1 battle star (World War II)
- Fate: Sold for scrap, 15 August 1966

General characteristics
- Class & type: Buckley-class destroyer escort
- Displacement: 1,400 long tons (1,422 t) standard; 1,740 long tons (1,768 t) full load
- Length: 306 ft (93 m)
- Beam: 37 ft (11 m)
- Draft: 9 ft 6 in (2.90 m) standard; 11 ft 3 in (3.43 m) full load
- Propulsion: 2 × boilers; General Electric turbo-electric drive; 12,000 shp (8.9 MW); 2 × solid manganese-bronze 3,600 lb (1,600 kg) 3-bladed propellers, 8 ft 6 in (2.59 m) diameter, 7 ft 7 in (2.31 m) pitch; 2 × rudders; 359 tons fuel oil
- Speed: 23 knots (43 km/h; 26 mph)
- Range: 3,700 nmi (6,900 km) at 15 kn (28 km/h; 17 mph); 6,000 nmi (11,000 km) at 12 kn (22 km/h; 14 mph)
- Complement: 15 officers, 198 men
- Armament: 3 × 3"/50 caliber guns; 1 × quad 1.1"/75 caliber gun; 8 × single 20 mm guns; 1 × triple 21 inch (533 mm) torpedo tubes; 1 × Hedgehog anti-submarine mortar; 8 × K-gun depth charge projectors; 2 × depth charge tracks

USS Hopping (DE-155) was a Buckley-class destroyer escort in service with the United States Navy from 1943 to 1947. In 1944, she was converted to a Charles Lawrence-class high speed transport and redesignated "APD-51". She was sold for scrap in 1966.

== History ==
USS Hopping was named in honor of Lieutenant Commander Hallsted L. Hopping, commanding officer of Scouting Six, embarked on the aircraft carrier USS Enterprise, killed in action during the 1 February 1942 Marshall Islands Raid. LCDR Hopping was the first U.S. Navy aircraft squadron commander to lose his life in World War II. She was launched at the Norfolk Navy Yard, Portsmouth, Virginia, on 9 March 1943, sponsored by Mrs. H. L. Hopping, widow of Lieutenant Commander Hopping; and commissioned on 21 May 1943.

=== Battle of the Atlantic ===
The new destroyer escort conducted a shakedown cruise out of Bermuda and after escorting an LST convoy to Norfolk, Virginia, made a voyage to Casablanca, where she arrived on 2 September 1943. There Hopping formed with a new convoy and returned to New York on 25 September.

In the year that followed Hopping made nine convoy crossings from New York to United Kingdom ports, bringing vital supplies for the war in Europe. While en route to Britain on 3 May 1944 a sister ship, USS Donnell, was torpedoed and seriously damaged as the escort vessels stalked a U-boat. Hopping helped to drive off the marauder with numerous depth charge attacks, and then took Donnell in tow. Struggling for two days in heavy seas, she managed to bring her sister ship within range of British salvage ships off Ireland, which towed her into Derry.

=== Pacific War ===
Hopping returned to Frontier Base, Staten Island, during October–November 1944, where she was converted to a Charles Lawrence-class high speed transport. Reclassified APD-51, she underwent shakedown training in Chesapeake Bay and departed Norfolk on 20 December 1944 to take part in the Pacific War, then entering its climactic stage. The new transport steamed via the Panama Canal and San Diego to Pearl Harbor, anchoring there on 15 January 1945. There she trained with Underwater Demolition Teams, the Navy's famed "frogmen", until 13 February, when she got underway for the Philippines. Hopping arrived at Leyte Gulf on 4 March to prepare for what was to be the last great amphibious campaign of the war, Okinawa.

Hopping sailed for Kerama Retto on 21 March with UDT-7 embarked, and during the early days of the campaign carried out many reconnaissance and demolition assignments. When not putting frogmen ashore, the ship acted as screening ship for larger units off Kerama Retto, and while on this duty assisted in splashing several aircraft the night of 28/29 March. As Marines landed on Okinawa itself on 1 April, Hopping turned to screening and patrol duties, fighting off numerous Japanese air attacks. While in Buckner Bay on a reconnaissance operation on 9 April, the ship engaged a concealed enemy shore battery, and while silencing the gun, sustained several damaging hits. As a result, she proceeded to Ulithi for repairs, arriving there on 23 April 1945.

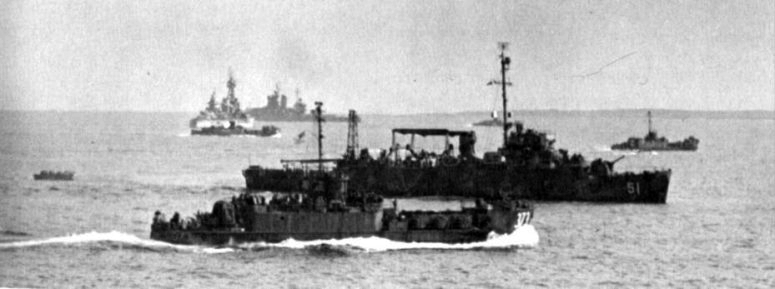
Hopping off Okinawa, in 1945.

Hopping was soon back in the thick of the fighting at Okinawa, however, returning on 17 May to resume screening duties as the air and land battles raged. She remained off Okinawa continuously until the island was secured fighting off countless mass attacks by the desperate Japanese. The ship sailed on 8 August with a convoy bound for Leyte, and while in the historic gulf on 15 August learned of the surrender of Japan.

The ship's first occupation duty was to aid in the evacuation of former prisoners of war from Japan. She arrived in Japan on 11 September and disembarked over 100 former Navy and Marine prisoners at Guam on 19 September. Following convoy duty and anti-mine work in Japanese and Philippine waters, Hopping got underway from Tokyo Bay on 24 November 1945 with returnees for the United States. She arrived San Diego on 11 December.

=== Decommissioning and fate ===
Hopping departed San Diego on 17 December and after spending short periods at Charleston, South Carolina, and Norfolk, arrived at Green Cove Springs, Florida, on 27 April 1946. She decommissioned on 5 May 1947; entered the Atlantic Reserve Fleet; and remained berthed with the Texas group until she was struck from the Navy List in September 1964, and sold on 15 August 1966 to Boston Metals Company, Baltimore, Maryland.

== Awards ==
Hopping received one battle star for World War II service.
