= Hubble Origins Probe =

Proposed orbital telescope

The Hubble Origins Probe (HOP) was a proposal for an orbital telescope made in 2005 in response to the first cancellation of the fourth Hubble Space Telescope (HST) servicing mission. It would have used an Atlas V rocket or similar launch vehicle to launch a much lighter, unaberrated mirror and optical telescope assembly, using the instruments that had already been built for SM4, along with a new wide-field imager. It would have cost between $700 million and $1 billion.

Funding for the mission was never allocated; in February 2005, Sean O'Keefe, the NASA administrator who had cancelled SM4, resigned. Michael D. Griffin, NASA administrator after O'Keefe, reinstated the servicing missions, making HOP redundant.
