= Project Hindsight =

Project Hindsight was an American retrospective study conducted to determine the effectiveness of several post-World War II weapons research projects. The project was conducted by the Office of the Director of Defense Research and Engineering, a sub-agency of the United States Department of Defense (DoD). The study ran from 1963 to 1967 and the final report was published in October 1969 and released to the public in September 1970. An interim report was published in 1966.

== Parameters ==
The project had two goals: the first was to identify R&D management productivity and the second was to measure the overall cost-effectiveness of using recently developed weapon systems compared to their predecessors that were in use 10 to 20 years earlier. The project conducted the examination of 20 weapon systems, other military equipment, and the contribution of R&D during World War II identified in the study as "events".

== Findings ==
Of all 'events' studied by Project Hindsight, 91% were technological, and only 9% were classed as science. Within the latter category 8.7% were applied science, whereas only 0.3%, or two 'events', were due to basic or undirected science. This particular finding undermined the traditional view that technological progress is the outcome of basic research since the direct influence of science on technology is very small. On the other hand, it confirmed the DoD's research strategy, citing that the investment on science and technology from 1946 to 1962 "has been paid many times over".

== Responses ==
As science and technology studies scholar Edwin Layton observed in 1971, 'the publication of these results produced a spate of indignant letters to the editors of Science.' He noted that many of these letters missed the point, and instead should focus on the interaction between science and technology rather than attempting to demonstrate that fundamental scientific research influences technology development more than Project Hindsight had suggested.

He also called attention to a subsequent study, Technology in Retrospect and Critical Events in Science (TRACES), which 'revealed cases in which mission-oriented research or development effort elicited later nonmission research, which often was found to be crucial to the ultimate innovation'. TRACES was a study undertaken to challenge Project Hindsight's conclusions through the examination of civilian technologies and their development.
