= Grasshopper (robot weather station) =

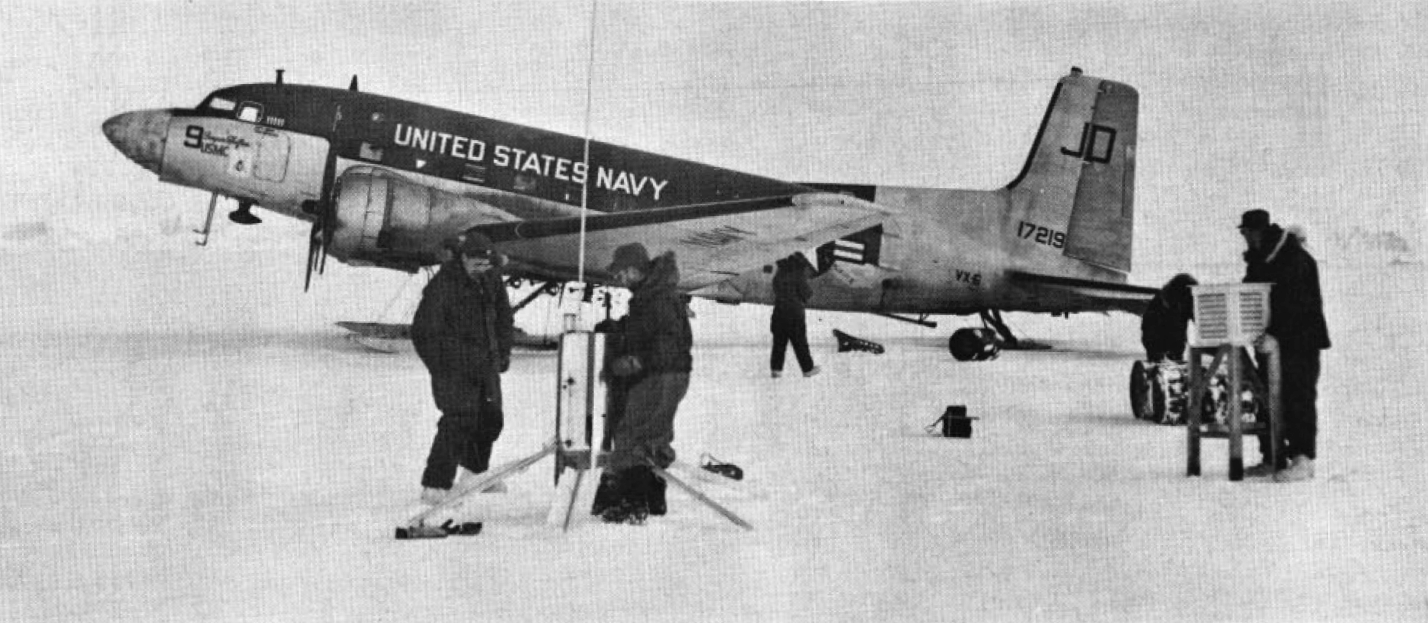
US Navy members make adjustments to a Grasshopper in Antarctica

The Grasshopper was a project by the United States Air Force and United States Navy to develop a portable robot weather station deployed by parachute from long range aircraft in the early 1950s. The Grasshopper was designed to be deployed by parachute into enemy territory and radio back basic weather information for air strikes.

With the USAF Grasshopper after being parachuted down from a long range aircraft, a small explosive charge disconnects the parachute upon impact with the ground. After a selected preset time, a second explosive charge would deploy the legs of the unit while setting it upright on the ground. Finally, a third explosive charge would extend the antenna and make the unit ready to begin taking weather measurements, broadcasting them back three times a day at selected timed-intervals (so other aircraft can pick up the short range signal). Reports also stated that the Grasshopper could be used to guide in strike aircraft with the internal clock set for the approximate time the strike aircraft would arrive near the target.
