= Hopper, West Virginia =

- Unincorporated community
- Location within West Virginia Location within the United States
- Coordinates: 37°49′16″N 80°21′54″W
- Country: United States
- State: West Virginia
- County: Greenbrier
- Elevation: 1,795 ft (547 m)
- Time zone: UTC-5 (Eastern (EST))
  - Summer (DST): UTC-4 (EDT)
- Area codes: 304 & 681
- GNIS feature ID: 1554742

Hopper is an unincorporated community in Greenbrier County, West Virginia, United States. Hopper is located along the Greenbrier River, 4.5 miles (7.2 km) east-northeast of Lewisburg.
