= Spike (application) =

Email client and business communication application

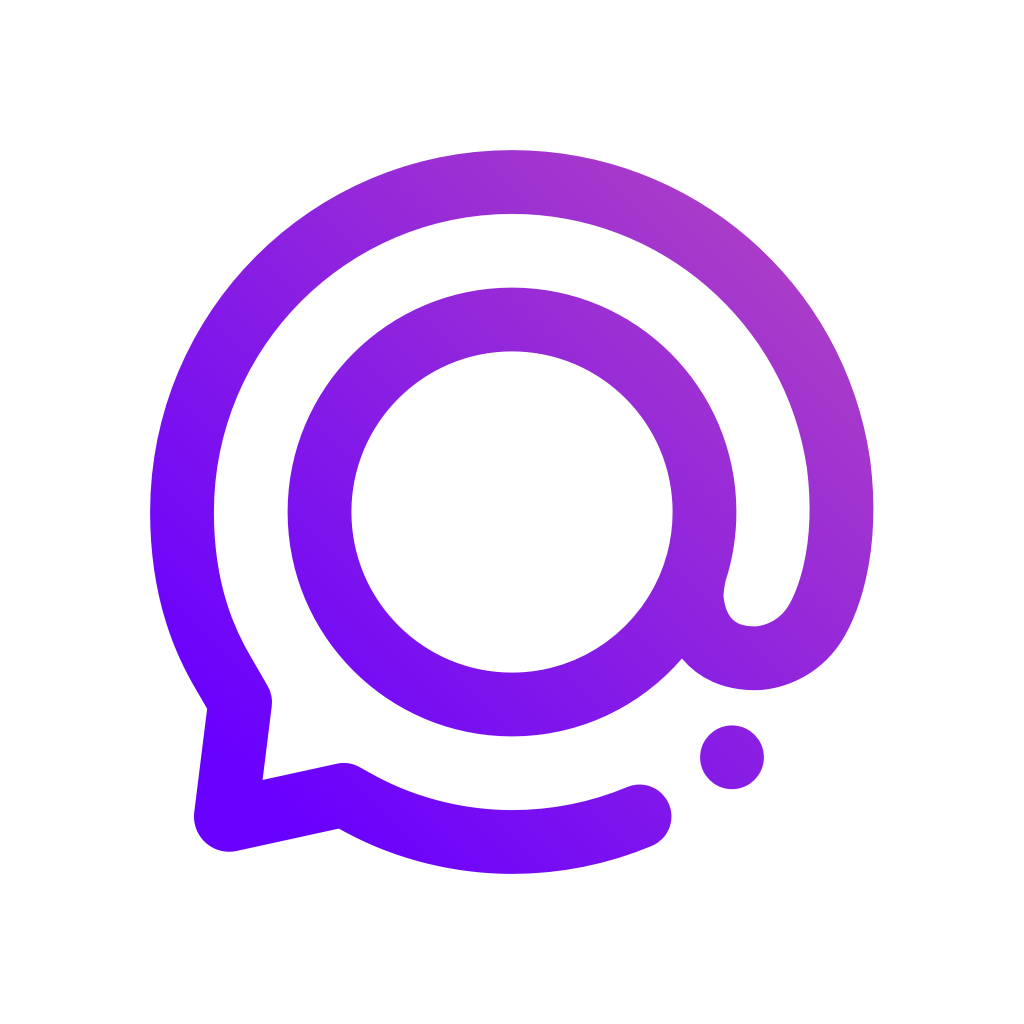
- Developer: ChatFlow Ltd.
- Initial release: 2013; 13 years ago
- Platform: Microsoft Windows, MacOS, iOS and Android, web
- Available in: 10 languages
- List of languages English; Catalan, French, German, Hebrew, Italian, Japanese, Portuguese, Spanish, Russian
- Type: Conversational email
- Website: spikenow.com

Spike is a cross-platform email client and AI-powered communication app, available on Windows, MacOS, iOS, Android and the web. It has a chat-like, conversational view for emails with AI-powered inbox management and integrated collaboration features. Depending on the selected plan, it can be used solely as an email application or as a full suite of business communication tools.

== History ==
Founded in 2013 by Erez Pilosof and Dvir Ben-Aroya, Spike is a software application that puts existing e-mails into a multimedia messaging, chat-like interface enhanced with video and voice calls. The application was initially named Hop.

In 2019, the developers completed a $5 million funding round including investment from Wix.com and NFX Capital.

In 2020, Spike raised $8m in a Series A funding round led by Insight Partners with the participation from previous rounds' investors.

In 2021 Spike announced a collaboration with Meta to launch on the Oculus Store and would become one of the first productivity apps to launch in Meta's new virtual world, known as the Metaverse.

In June 2023, the company introduced its corporate offering — Teamspace, a corporate communication platform for teams with features such as company-wide channels for broad conversations, private groups for specific topics or projects, direct one-on-one conversations, video meetings, file collaboration, AI-powered email messaging, and custom email domain. It supports file management, search capabilities, and project management. Built on open-protocol technology, Spike Teamspace enables users to send and receive messages from all email providers. Regardless of whether the other party is using Spike.

== Company operations ==
Spike is developed and operated by SpikeNow LTD. Dvir Ben Aroya serves as Spike’s CEO and Erez Pilosof is the CTO. The company is headquartered in Tel Aviv, Israel.

== Mode of use ==
The app enables users to organize email into three types of "conversations,"a traditional inbox/sent format, by subject, or by people. Spike users can also make audio and video calls to each other, and other features include a calendar, contact list, and Groups.

Spike is available for Microsoft Windows, MacOS, iOS and Android, and as a web version, and works with Gmail, Outlook, Exchange, iCloud, Yahoo! Mail and IMAP email providers.

== Features ==
Since 2023, the platform features an AI-driven assistant, Magic AI, for customized email creation, document summarization, research, content generation, advanced note-taking, project management, and real-time translation. Since 2023, Spike offers custom email domain management. It supports team collaboration through Channels, uniting members globally with access to historical messages, and combines email with real-time messaging via Conversational Email. The Shared Inbox allows team collaboration on emails, while Groups support private conversations and invitations. It also features integrated video meetings, real-time collaboration on documents and notes, and email hosting with custom domains. Super Search enables retrieval of various content, and the Priority Inbox organizes emails by priority. Collaborative Tasks offer real-time updates and tracking. The platform allows voice message sending from mobile devices and integrates multiple calendar platforms into a unified schedule. File Management optimizes attachment handling, and the Unified Inbox consolidates emails from multiple accounts. Spike ensures data security with AES-256 encryption and private keys.

The platform features AI-powered inbox management and communication tools. In May 2025, Spike launched its AI Feed feature, which automatically summarizes unread messages in a unified stream and enables bulk email actions. Additional AI capabilities include email composition assistance, document summarization, content generation, note-taking enhancement, and real-time translation.
