= List of flag bearers for Hungary at the Olympics =

Hungary at the Olympics
- IOC code: HUN
- NOC: Hungarian Olympic Committee
- Website: www.olimpia.hu (in Hungarian and English)
- Medals: Gold 189 Silver 163 Bronze 188 Total 540

Summer appearances
- 1896; 1900; 1904; 1908; 1912; 1920; 1924; 1928; 1932; 1936; 1948; 1952; 1956; 1960; 1964; 1968; 1972; 1976; 1980; 1984; 1988; 1992; 1996; 2000; 2004; 2008; 2012; 2016; 2020; 2024

Winter appearances
- 1924; 1928; 1932; 1936; 1948; 1952; 1956; 1960; 1964; 1968; 1972; 1976; 1980; 1984; 1988; 1992; 1994; 1998; 2002; 2006; 2010; 2014; 2018; 2022; 2026

Other related appearances
- 1906 Intercalated Games

This is a list of flag bearers who have represented Hungary at the Olympics.

Flag bearers carry the national flag of their country at the opening ceremony of the Olympic Games.

#	Event year	Season	Flag bearer	Sport
1	1908	Summer	István Mudin	Athletics
2	1912	Summer	Jenő Réti	Artistic gymnastics
3	1924	Summer	Sándor Toldi	Athletics
4	1928	Winter	Gyula Szepes	Nordic combined
5	1928	Summer	Kálmán Egri	Athletics
6	1932	Winter	László Szollás	Figure skating
7	1932	Summer	Péter Bácsalmási	Athletics
8	1936	Winter	Levente Balatoni	Alpine skiing
9	1936	Summer	Péter Bácsalmási	Athletics
10	1948	Winter	András Harangvölgyi	Alpine skiing
11	1948	Summer	Imre Németh	Athletics
12	1952	Winter	Ferenc Lőrincz	Speed skating
13	1952	Summer	Imre Németh	Athletics
14	1956	Winter	István Erdélyi	Official
15	1956	Summer	József Csermák	Athletics
16	1960	Winter	János Bartha	Official
17	1960	Summer	János Simon	Basketball
18	1964	Winter	Lajos Koutny	Ice hockey
19	1964	Summer	Gergely Kulcsár	Athletics
20	1968	Winter	Mihály Martos	Speed skating
21	1968	Summer	Gergely Kulcsár	Athletics
22	1972	Winter	Zsuzsa Almássy	Figure skating
23	1972	Summer	Gergely Kulcsár	Athletics
24	1976	Winter	László Vajda	Figure skating
25	1976	Summer	Jenő Kamuti	Fencing
26	1980	Winter	András Sallay	Figure skating
27	1980	Summer	István Szivós Sr.	Water polo
28	1984	Winter	Gábor Mayer	Biathlon
29	1988	Winter	Attila Tóth	Figure skating
30	1988	Summer	István Vaskuti	Canoeing
31	1992	Winter	Attila Tóth	Figure skating
32	1992	Summer	Tibor Komáromi	Wrestling
33	1994	Winter	Attila Bónis	Alpine skiing
34	1996	Summer	Bence Szabó	Fencing
35	1998	Winter	Krisztina Egyed	Speed skating
36	2000	Summer	Rita Kőbán	Canoeing
37	2002	Winter	Krisztina Egyed	Speed skating
38	2004	Summer	Antal Kovács	Judo
39	2006	Winter	Rózsa Darázs	Short track speed skating
40	2008	Summer	Zoltán Kammerer	Canoeing
41	2010	Winter	Júlia Sebestyén	Figure skating
42	2012	Summer	Péter Biros	Water polo
43	2014	Winter	Bernadett Heidum	Short track speed skating
44	2016	Summer	Áron Szilágyi	Fencing
45	2018	Winter	Konrád Nagy	Speed skating
46	2020	Summer	László Cseh	Swimming
46	2020	Summer	Aida Mohamed	Fencing
47	2022	Winter	Márton Kékesi	Alpine skiing
47	2022	Winter	Zita Tóth	Alpine skiing
48	2024	Summer	Blanka Bíró	Handball
48	2024	Summer	Krisztián Tóth	Judo

== See also ==
- Hungary at the Olympics
