= Hungary at the 1968 Winter Olympics =

- IOC code: HUN
- NOC: Hungarian Olympic Committee
- Website: www.olimpia.hu (in Hungarian and English)

in Grenoble, France February 6–18, 1968
- Competitors: 10 (8 men and 2 women) in 4 sports
- Flag bearer: Mihály Martos
- Medals: Gold 0 Silver 0 Bronze 0 Total 0

Winter Olympics appearances (overview)
- 1924; 1928; 1932; 1936; 1948; 1952; 1956; 1960; 1964; 1968; 1972; 1976; 1980; 1984; 1988; 1992; 1994; 1998; 2002; 2006; 2010; 2014; 2018; 2022; 2026

Hungary competed at the 1968 Winter Olympics in Grenoble, France.

== Cross-country skiing ==
Men

Event	Athlete	Race	
Event	Athlete	Time	Rank
15 km	Miklós Holló	58:37.2	64
15 km	Tibor Holéczy	53:35.9	49
30 km	Miklós Holló	1'53:41.1	59
30 km	Tibor Holéczy	1'51:42.0	57
50 km	Miklós Holló	2'51:24.1	45
50 km	Tibor Holéczy	2'45:38.0	42

Women

Event	Athlete	Race	
Event	Athlete	Time	Rank
5 km	Éva Balázs	18:05.8	27
10 km	Éva Balázs	40:58.3	24

== Figure skating ==
Men

Athlete	CF	FS	Points	Places	Rank
Jenö Ebert	17	24	1595.4	180	19

Women

Athlete	CF	FS	Points	Places	Rank
Zsuzsa Almássy	6	8	1757.0	57	6

== Ski jumping ==
Athlete	Event	Jump 1		Jump 2		Total	
Athlete	Event	Distance	Points	Distance	Points	Points	Rank
Mihály Gellér	Normal hill	64.0 (fall)	45.2	67.5	83.8	129.0	58
László Gellér	Normal hill	73.0	98.6	69.5	91.0	189.6	34
Mihály Gellér	Large hill	85.5	80.6	92.0 (fall)	57.2	137.8	56
László Gellér	Large hill	95.0	98.9	90.0	92.4	191.3	19

== Speed skating ==
Men

Event	Athlete	Race	
Event	Athlete	Time	Rank
500 m	György Martos	43.0	38
500 m	Mihály Martos	42.5	31
1500 m	Mihály Martos	2:15.8	45
1500 m	György Ivánkai	2:12.6	29
1500 m	György Martos	2:12.2	27
5000 m	György Ivánkai	8:07.5	31
10,000 m	György Ivánkai	17:36.2	27

== Sources ==
- Official Olympic Reports
- International Olympic Committee results database
- Olympic Winter Games 1968, full results by sports-reference.com
