= Hungary at the Olympics =

- IOC code: HUN
- NOC: Hungarian Olympic Committee
- Website: www.olimpia.hu (in Hungarian and English)
- Medals Ranked 14th: Gold 189 Silver 163 Bronze 188 Total 540

Summer appearances
- 1896; 1900; 1904; 1908; 1912; 1920; 1924; 1928; 1932; 1936; 1948; 1952; 1956; 1960; 1964; 1968; 1972; 1976; 1980; 1984; 1988; 1992; 1996; 2000; 2004; 2008; 2012; 2016; 2020; 2024

Winter appearances
- 1924; 1928; 1932; 1936; 1948; 1952; 1956; 1960; 1964; 1968; 1972; 1976; 1980; 1984; 1988; 1992; 1994; 1998; 2002; 2006; 2010; 2014; 2018; 2022; 2026

Other related appearances
- 1906 Intercalated Games

Hungary first participated at the Olympic Games at the inaugural 1896 Games, and has sent athletes to compete in most Summer Olympic Games and every Winter Olympic Games since then. The nation was not invited to the 1920 Games for its role in World War I, and was part of the Soviet-led boycott of the 1984 Summer Olympics.

Hungarian athletes have won a total of 530 medals at the Summer Games and 10 medals at the Winter Games, with fencing being the top medal-producing sport. Hungary is ranked 9th in Summer Games medals and 13th in total medals for both Summer and Winter Games. Hungary has won more Olympic medals than any other existing nation never to have hosted the Games. After overtaking Finland at the 2020 Olympic Games, it is now the country with the highest number of gold medals won at Summer Olympics per capita (not counting microstates with less than 1 million inhabitants). At the 1956 and 1980 Winter Olympics, all participating Hungarian athletes won medals.

The National Olympic Committee for Hungary is the Hungarian Olympic Committee, and was created and recognized in 1895.

== Medal tables ==
=== Medals by Summer Games ===
Games	Athletes	Gold	Silver	Bronze	Total	Rank
(Kingdom of Greece) 1896 Athens	7	2	1	3	6	6
(French Third Republic) 1900 Paris	20	1	2	2	5	11
(United States) 1904 St. Louis	4	2	1	1	4	5
(United Kingdom) 1908 London	63	3	4	2	9	6
(Sweden) 1912 Stockholm	119	3	2	3	8	9
(Belgium) 1920 Antwerp	did not participate					
(French Third Republic) 1924 Paris	89	2	3	4	9	13
(Netherlands) 1928 Amsterdam	109	4	5	0	9	9
(United States) 1932 Los Angeles	58	6	4	5	15	6
(Nazi Germany) 1936 Berlin	216	10	1	5	16	3
(United Kingdom) 1948 London	128	10	5	12	27	4
(Finland) 1952 Helsinki	189	16	10	16	42	3
(Australia) 1956 Melbourne	108	9	10	7	26	4
(Italy) 1960 Rome	184	6	8	7	21	7
(Japan) 1964 Tokyo	182	10	7	5	22	6
1968 Mexico City	167	10	10	12	32	4
(West Germany) 1972 Munich	232	6	13	16	35	8
(Canada) 1976 Montreal	178	4	5	13	22	10
(Soviet Union) 1980 Moscow	263	7	10	15	32	6
(United States) 1984 Los Angeles	boycotted					
(South Korea) 1988 Seoul	188	11	6	6	23	6
(Spain) 1992 Barcelona	217	11	12	7	30	8
(United States) 1996 Atlanta	212	7	4	10	21	12
(Australia) 2000 Sydney	178	8	6	3	17	13
(Greece) 2004 Athens	209	8	6	3	17	12
(China) 2008 Beijing	171	3	5	2	10	21
(United Kingdom) 2012 London	159	8	4	6	18	10
(Brazil) 2016 Rio de Janeiro	160	8	3	4	15	12
(Japan) 2020 Tokyo	166	6	7	7	20	15
(France) 2024 Paris	178	6	7	6	19	14
(United States) 2028 Los Angeles	future event					
(Australia) 2032 Brisbane	future event					
Total (28/30)	4,154	187	161	182	530	9

=== Medals by Winter Games ===
Games	Athletes	Gold	Silver	Bronze	Total	Rank
(France) 1924 Chamonix	4	0	0	0	0	–
(Switzerland) 1928 St. Moritz	13	0	0	0	0	–
(United States) 1932 Lake Placid	4	0	0	1	1	10
(Nazi Germany) 1936 Garmisch-Partenkirchen	25	0	0	1	1	10
(Switzerland) 1948 St. Moritz	22	0	1	0	1	11
(Norway) 1952 Oslo	12	0	0	1	1	12
(Italy) 1956 Cortina d'Ampezzo	2	0	0	1	1	12
(United States) 1960 Squaw Valley	3	0	0	0	0	–
(Austria) 1964 Innsbruck	28	0	0	0	0	–
(France) 1968 Grenoble	10	0	0	0	0	–
(Japan) 1972 Sapporo	1	0	0	0	0	–
(Austria) 1976 Innsbruck	3	0	0	0	0	–
(United States) 1980 Lake Placid	2	0	1	0	1	15
(Socialist Federal Republic of Yugoslavia) 1984 Sarajevo	9	0	0	0	0	–
(Canada) 1988 Calgary	5	0	0	0	0	–
(France) 1992 Albertville	24	0	0	0	0	–
(Norway) 1994 Lillehammer	16	0	0	0	0	–
(Japan) 1998 Nagano	17	0	0	0	0	–
(United States) 2002 Salt Lake City	25	0	0	0	0	–
(Italy) 2006 Turin	19	0	0	0	0	–
(Canada) 2010 Vancouver	16	0	0	0	0	–
(Russia) 2014 Sochi	16	0	0	0	0	–
(South Korea) 2018 Pyeongchang	19	1	0	0	1	21
(China) 2022 Beijing	14	1	0	2	3	20
(Italy) 2026 Milano Cortina	16	0	0	0	0	–
(France) 2030 French Alps	future event					
(United States) 2034 Utah	future event					
Total (25/25)	325	2	2	6	10	36

=== Medals by summer sport ===
Leading in that sport

Sport	Gold	Silver	Bronze	Total
Fencing	39	25	29	93
Swimming	30	27	20	77
Canoeing	28	35	30	93
Wrestling	20	17	19	56
Gymnastics	15	11	14	40
Athletics	10	13	18	41
Modern pentathlon	10	8	6	24
Boxing	10	2	8	20
Water polo	9	3	5	17
Shooting	7	3	8	18
Football	3	1	1	5
Weightlifting	2	9	9	20
Marathon swimming	2	1	1	4
Judo	1	3	6	10
Taekwondo	1	0	0	1
Handball	0	1	2	3
Rowing	0	1	2	3
Sailing	0	1	1	2
Equestrian	0	0	1	1
Karate	0	0	1	1
Tennis	0	0	1	1
Totals (21 entries)	187	161	182	530

=== Medals by winter sport ===
Sport	Gold	Silver	Bronze	Total
Short track speed skating	2	0	2	4
Figure skating	0	2	4	6
Totals (2 entries)	2	2	6	10

== Youth Games medal tables ==
=== Medals by Summer Youth Games ===
Games	Gold	Silver	Bronze	Total
2010 Singapore	6	4	5	15
(China) 2014 Nanjing	6	6	11	23
(Argentina) 2018 Buenos Aires	12	7	5	24
Totals (3 entries)	24	17	21	62

=== Medals by Winter Youth Games ===
Games	Gold	Silver	Bronze	Total
(Austria) 2012 Innsbruck	0	2	0	2
(Norway) 2016 Lillehammer	0	1	1	2
(Switzerland) 2020 Lausanne	0	0	0	0
(South Korea) 2024 Gangwon	1	0	1	2
Totals (4 entries)	1	3	2	6

=== Medals by sport ===
==== Medals by summer sport ====
- Updated after 2018 Summer Youth Olympics
Leading in that sport

Sport	Gold	Silver	Bronze	Total
Swimming	15	3	4	22
Canoeing	4	3	0	7
Fencing	3	0	2	5
Judo	2	1	2	5
Athletics	0	4	5	9
Gymnastics	0	3	1	4
Modern Pentathlon	0	2	1	3
Wrestling	0	1	0	1
Boxing	0	0	2	2
Beach handball	0	0	1	1
Cycling	0	0	1	1
Sailing	0	0	1	1
Shooting	0	0	1	1
Totals (13 entries)	24	17	21	62

==== Medals by winter sport ====
- Updated after 2024 Winter Youth Olympics
Leading in that sport

Sport	Gold	Silver	Bronze	Total
Ice hockey	1	2	0	3
Short track speed skating	0	1	2	3
Totals (2 entries)	1	3	2	6

== Athletes with most medals ==
The Hungarian athletes who won the most medals in the history of the Olympic Games are the fencer Aladár Gerevich and the gymnast Ágnes Keleti.

Athlete	Sport	Games	Gold medal	Silver medal	Bronze medal	Total
Aladár Gerevich	Fencing	1932, 1936, 1948, 1952, 1956, 1960	7	1	2	10
Danuta Kozák	Kayaking	2008, 2012, 2016, 2020	6	1	1	8
Pál Kovács	Fencing	1936, 1948, 1952, 1956, 1960	6	0	1	7
Rudolf Kárpáti	Fencing	1948, 1952, 1956, 1960	6	0	0	6
Ágnes Keleti	Gymnastics	1952, 1956	5	3	2	10
Krisztina Egerszegi	Swimming	1988, 1992, 1996	5	1	1	7
Győző Kulcsár	Fencing	1964, 1968, 1972, 1976	4	0	2	6
Tamás Darnyi	Swimming	1988, 1992	4	0	0	4
Jenő Fuchs	Fencing	1908, 1912	4	0	0	4
Katalin Kovács	Kayaking	2000, 2004, 2008, 2012	3	5	0	8
Natasa Dusev-Janics	Kayaking	2004, 2008, 2012	3	2	1	6
András Balczó	Modern pentathlon	1960, 1968, 1972	3	2	0	5
Dezső Gyarmati	Water polo	1948, 1952, 1956, 1960, 1964	3	1	1	5
Áron Szilágyi	Fencing	2012, 2016, 2020, 2024	3	1	1	5
Katinka Hosszú	Swimming	2016	3	1	0	4
Zoltán Kammerer	Kayaking	2000, 2004, 2012	3	1	0	4
Gabriella Szabó	Kayaking	2008, 2012, 2016	3	1	0	4
Tibor Berczelly	Fencing	1936, 1948, 1952	3	0	2	5
Endre Kabos	Fencing	1932, 1936	3	0	1	4
György Kárpáti	Water polo	1952, 1956, 1960, 1964	3	0	1	4
Tibor Benedek	Water polo	2000, 2004, 2008	3	0	0	3
Péter Biros	Water polo	2000, 2004, 2008	3	0	0	3
Csaba Fenyvesi	Fencing	1968, 1972	3	0	0	3
Tamás Kásás	Water polo	2000, 2004, 2008	3	0	0	3
Gergely Kiss	Water polo	2000, 2004, 2008	3	0	0	3
Tamás Molnár	Water polo	2000, 2004, 2008	3	0	0	3
László Papp	Boxing	1948, 1952, 1956	3	0	0	3
László Rajcsányi	Fencing	1936, 1948, 1952	3	0	0	3
Botond Storcz	Kayaking	2000, 2004	3	0	0	3
Zoltán Szécsi	Water polo	2000, 2004, 2008	3	0	0	3
Zoltán Halmay	Swimming	1900, 1904, 1908	2	4	1	7
Ildikó Újlaky-Rejtő	Fencing	1960, 1964, 1968, 1972, 1976	2	3	2	7
Tamara Csipes	Kayaking	2016, 2020, 2024	2	3	1	6
Rita Kőbán	Kayaking	1988, 1992, 1996, 2000	2	3	1	6
Margit Korondi	Gymnastics	1952, 1956	2	2	4	8

== Athletes with most appearances ==
Athlete	Total	Sport	Games
Aida Mohamed	7	Fencing	1996, 2000, 2004, 2008, 2012, 2016, 2020
Áron Gádorfalvi	6	Sailing	1996, 2000, 2004, 2008, 2012, 2016
Aladár Gerevich	6	Fencing	1932, 1936, 1948, 1952, 1956, 1960
Csilla Bátorfi	5	Table tennis	1988, 1992, 1996, 2000, 2004
Tibor Benedek	5	Water polo	1992, 1996, 2000, 2004, 2008
László Cseh	5	Swimming	2004, 2008, 2012, 2016, 2020
Imre Földi	5	Weightlifting	1960, 1964, 1968, 1972, 1976
Dezső Gyarmati	5	Water polo	1948, 1952, 1956, 1960, 1964
Katinka Hosszú	5	Swimming	2004, 2008, 2012, 2016, 2020
Géza Imre	5	Fencing	1996, 2004, 2008, 2012, 2016
Zoltán Kammerer	5	Kayaking	1996, 2000, 2004, 2008, 2012
Jenő Kamuti	5	Fencing	1960, 1964, 1968, 1972, 1976
Tamás Kásás	5	Water polo	1996, 2000, 2004, 2008, 2012
Iván Kovács	5	Fencing	1992, 1996, 2000, 2004, 2008
Pál Kovács	5	Fencing	1936, 1948, 1952, 1956, 1960
Szilárd Kun	5	Shooting	1952, 1956, 1964, 1968, 1972
Georgina Póta	5	Table tennis	2008, 2012, 2016, 2020, 2024
Ildikó Rejtő	5	Fencing	1960, 1964, 1968, 1972, 1976
Péter Sidi	5	Shooting	2000, 2004, 2008, 2012, 2016
Áron Szilágyi	5	Fencing	2008, 2012, 2016, 2020, 2024
Boglárka Kapás	5	Swimming	2008, 2012, 2016, 2020, 2024
Krisztina Tóth	5	Table tennis	1996, 2000, 2004, 2008, 2012
Dénes Varga	5	Water polo	2008, 2012, 2016, 2020, 2024

Notes: athletes in bold are still active.

== Flagbearers ==
Summer Olympics
Games	Athlete	Sport
(United Kingdom) 1908 London	István Mudin	Athletics
(Sweden) 1912 Stockholm	Jenő Réti	Athletics
(Belgium) 1920 Antwerp	Hungary did not participate	
(France) 1924 Paris	Sándor Toldi	Athletics
(Netherlands) 1928 Amsterdam	Kálmán Egri	Athletics
(United States) 1932 Los Angeles	Péter Bácsalmási	Athletics
(Germany) 1936 Berlin	Péter Bácsalmási	Athletics
(United Kingdom) 1948 London	Imre Németh	Athletics
(Finland) 1952 Helsinki	Imre Németh	Athletics
(Australia) 1956 Melbourne	József Csermák	Athletics
(Italy) 1960 Rome	János Simon	Basketball
(Japan) 1964 Tokyo	Gergely Kulcsár	Athletics
1968 Mexico City	Gergely Kulcsár	Athletics
(Germany) 1972 Munich	Gergely Kulcsár	Athletics
(Canada) 1976 Montreal	Jenő Kamuti	Fencing
(Soviet Union) 1980 Moscow	István Szívós	Water polo
(United States) 1984 Los Angeles	Hungary did not participate	
(South Korea) 1988 Seoul	István Vaskuti	Canoeing
(Spain) 1992 Barcelona	Tibor Komáromi	Wrestling
(United States) 1996 Atlanta	Bence Szabó	Fencing
(Australia) 2000 Sydney	Rita Kőbán	Canoeing
(Greece) 2004 Athens	Antal Kovács	Judo
(China) 2008 Beijing	Zoltán Kammerer	Canoeing
(United Kingdom) 2012 London	Péter Biros	Water polo
(Brazil) 2016 Rio de Janeiro	Áron Szilágyi	Fencing
(Japan) 2020 Tokyo	Aida Mohamed; László Cseh	Fencing; Swimming
(France) 2024 Paris	Blanka Böde–Bíró; Krisztián Tóth	Handball; Judo

Winter Olympics
Games	Athlete	Sport
(France) 1924 Chamonix		
(Switzerland) 1928 St. Moritz	Gyula Szepes	Nordic combined
(United States) 1932 Lake Placid	László Szollás	Figure skating
(Germany) 1936 Garmisch-Partenkirchen	Levente Balatoni	Alpine skiing
(Switzerland) 1948 St. Moritz	András Harangvölgyi	Alpine skiing
(Norway) 1952 Oslo	Ferenc Lőrincz	Speed skating
(Italy) 1956 Cortina d'Ampezzo	István Erdélyi	
(United States) 1960 Squaw Valley	János Bartha	
(Austria) 1964 Innsbruck	Lajos Koutny	Ice hockey
(France) 1968 Grenoble	Mihály Martos	Speed skating
(Japan) 1972 Sapporo	Zsuzsa Almássy	Figure skating
(Austria) 1976 Innsbruck	László Vajda	Figure skating
(United States) 1980 Lake Placid	András Sallay	Figure skating
(Socialist Federal Republic of Yugoslavia) 1984 Sarajevo	Gábor Mayer	Biathlon
(Canada) 1988 Calgary	Attila Tóth	Figure skating
(France) 1992 Albertville	Attila Tóth	Figure skating
(Norway) 1994 Lillehammer	Attila Bónis	Alpine skiing
(Japan) 1998 Nagano	Krisztina Egyed	Speed skating
(United States) 2002 Salt Lake City	Krisztina Egyed	Speed skating
(Italy) 2006 Turin	Rózsa Darázs	Short track
(Canada) 2010 Vancouver	Júlia Sebestyén	Figure skating
(Russia) 2014 Sochi	Bernadett Heidum	Short track
(South Korea) 2018 Pyeongchang	Konrád Nagy	Speed skating
(China) 2022 Beijing	Márton Kékesi; Zita Tóth	Alpine skiing

== Summary by sport ==
=== Summer Olympic Sports ===
- Updated after 2024 Summer Olympics

==== Athletics ====
Hungary first competed in athletics at the inaugural 1896 Games, with 3 athletes competing in 5 events and winning a silver and two bronze medals. The nation's first gold medal in the sport came in 1900, with Rudolf Bauer's victory in the discus throw.

Games	Athletes	Events	Gold	Silver	Bronze	Total	Rank
1896 Athens	3	5	0	1	2	3	4
1900 Paris	9	13	1	0	1	2	3
1904 St. Louis	2	5	0	0	0	0	–
1908 London	20	20	0	1	1	2	8
1912 Stockholm	25	18	0	0	1	1	11
1920 Antwerp	did not participate						
1924 Paris	16	17	0	1	0	1	9
1928 Amsterdam	27	17	0	1	0	1	12
1932 Los Angeles	5	4	0	0	0	0	–
1936 Berlin	25	20	1	0	0	1	7
1948 London	12	10	2	0	1	3	5
1952 Helsinki	35	25	1	0	4	5	8
1956 Melbourne	19	13	0	2	0	2	13
1960 Rome	26	19	0	1	2	3	11
1964 Tokyo	31	26	0	3	1	4	13
1968 Mexico City	31	25	2	1	4	7	7
1972 Munich	33	22	0	0	0	0	–
1976 Montreal	16	14	1	0	0	1	11
1980 Moscow	27	21	0	0	0	0	–
1984 Los Angeles	did not participate						
1988 Seoul	15	13	0	0	0	0	–
1992 Barcelona	24	18	0	0	0	0	–
1996 Atlanta	22	17	1	0	0	1	17
2000 Sydney	37	23	0	0	0	0	–
2004 Athens	35	26	0	1	0	1	30
2008 Beijing	20	17	0	0	0	0	–
2012 London	18	15	1	0	0	1	15
2016 Rio de Janeiro	19	11	0	0	1	1	35
2020 Tokyo	19	15	0	0	0	0	–
2024 Paris	18	13	0	1	0	1	31
Total			10	13	18	41	23

==== Basketball ====
Hungary men's national basketball team

Games	Players	Round	Pos	Pld	W	L	GF	GA	GD
1936 Berlin	Withdrew from the tournament								
1948 London	12	9th–16th placement	16th	8	3	5	201	178	+23
1952 Helsinki	13	First round	16th	3	0	3	143	199	−56
1956 Melbourne	Declined participation								
1960 Rome	12	9th–12th placement	9th	8	5	3	602	604	−2
1964 Tokyo	12	Match for 13th place	13th	9	4	5	574	617	−43
1968–Present	did not compete								
Total		4/20		28	12	16	1,520	1,598	−78

Hungary women's national basketball team

Games	Players	Round	Pos	Pld	W	L	GF	GA	GD
1976 Montreal	did not compete								
1980 Moscow	12	Bronze medal match	4th	6	2	4	409	475	−66
1984 Los Angeles	did not participate								
1988–Present	did not compete								
Total		1/12		6	2	4	409	475	−66

==== Boxing ====
Games	Boxers	Events	Gold	Silver	Bronze	Total	Rank
1904–1908	did not compete						
1912 Stockholm	Sport not held						
1920 Antwerp	did not participate						
1924 Paris	1	1	0	0	0	0	–
1928 Amsterdam	4	4	1	0	0	1	4
1932 Los Angeles	2	2	1	0	0	1	4
1936 Berlin	6	6	1	0	0	1	5
1948 London	6	6	2	0	0	2	3
1952 Helsinki	9	9	1	0	0	1	5
1956 Melbourne	2	2	1	0	0	1	6
1960 Rome	6	6	1	0	0	1	6
1964 Tokyo	5	5	0	0	0	0	–
1968 Mexico City	6	6	0	0	0	0	–
1972 Munich	6	6	1	2	1	4	3
1976 Montreal	8	8	0	0	0	0	–
1980 Moscow	9	9	0	0	2	2	10
1984 Los Angeles	did not participate						
1988 Seoul	9	9	0	0	1	1	14
1992 Barcelona	8	8	0	0	3	3	12
1996 Atlanta	5	5	1	0	0	1	9
2000 Sydney	3	3	0	0	1	1	13
2004 Athens	5	5	0	0	0	0	–
2008 Beijing	5	5	0	0	0	0	–
2012 London	3	3	0	0	0	0	–
2016 Rio de Janeiro	2	2	0	0	0	0	–
2020 Tokyo	1	1	0	0	0	0	–
2024 Paris	3	3	0	0	0	0	–
Total			10	2	8	20	7

==== Canoeing ====
Games	Athletes	Events	Gold	Silver	Bronze	Total	Rank
1936 Berlin	5	5	0	0	0	0	–
1948 London	5	4	0	0	0	0	–
1952 Helsinki	12	8	0	2	1	3	7
1956 Melbourne	13	9	1	3	3	7	4
1960 Rome	9	7	1	3	2	6	2
1964 Tokyo	10	7	0	1	0	1	6
1968 Mexico City	10	7	2	3	1	6	1
1972 Munich	12	7	0	2	2	4	5
1976 Montreal	14	11	0	3	5	8	5
1980 Moscow	16	11	1	1	1	3	5
1984 Los Angeles	did not participate						
1988 Seoul	16	12	2	1	1	4	3
1992 Barcelona	14	12	1	3	2	6	3
1996 Atlanta	19	12	2	1	3	6	4
2000 Sydney	15	12	4	2	1	7	1
2004 Athens	16	12	3	1	2	6	2
2008 Beijing	16	12	2	1	1	4	3
2012 London	13	9	3	2	1	6	2
2016 Rio de Janeiro	18	12	3	0	0	3	3
2020 Tokyo	18	9	3	2	1	6	1
2024 Paris	15	10	0	4	3	7	9
Total			28	35	30	93	3

==== Fencing ====
Hungary has won the third-most gold medals and third-most total medals in fencing, in each case behind Italy and France. Hungary has historically been most successful in the sabre events. Hungary's first fencing appearance was in 1900, with 7 fencers including sabreurs who finished 4th and 5th. Hungary has dominated the men's individual sabre, winning half of the gold medals (14 of 28), including a string of 9 consecutive victories from 1924 to 1964 (with an 11-Games podium streak extending further to 1972). Hungary had also won in 1908 and 1912; the streaks might have been 12 and 15 if the nation had not been excluded from the Games in 1920 due to its role in World War I.

Games	Fencers	Events	Gold	Silver	Bronze	Total	Rank
1896 Athens	did not compete						
1900 Paris	7	4	0	0	0	0	–
1904 St. Louis	did not compete						
1908 London	8	3	2	1	0	3	2
1912 Stockholm	13	4	2	1	1	4	1
1920 Antwerp	did not participate						
1924 Paris	10	5	1	1	2	4	3
1928 Amsterdam	17	7	2	1	0	3	3
1932 Los Angeles	10	4	2	0	2	4	3
1936 Berlin	19	7	3	0	1	4	2
1948 London	18	7	3	0	2	5	2
1952 Helsinki	17	7	2	2	2	6	2
1956 Melbourne	18	7	2	1	1	4	2
1960 Rome	21	8	2	2	0	4	2
1964 Tokyo	20	8	4	0	0	4	1
1968 Mexico City	20	8	2	2	3	7	2
1972 Munich	19	8	2	4	2	8	1
1976 Montreal	18	8	1	0	2	3	4
1980 Moscow	18	8	0	2	3	5	4
1984 Los Angeles	did not participate						
1988 Seoul	20	8	1	0	2	3	5
1992 Barcelona	20	8	1	2	0	3	5
1996 Atlanta	15	10	0	1	2	3	5
2000 Sydney	13	9	1	0	0	1	5
2004 Athens	15	8	1	2	0	3	3
2008 Beijing	15	8	0	0	1	1	12
2012 London	4	4	1	0	0	1	5
2016 Rio de Janeiro	9	6	2	1	1	4	2
2020 Tokyo	13	7	1	1	1	3	4
2024 Paris	15	9	1	1	1	3	7
Total			39	25	29	93	3

==== Gymnastics ====
Hungary sent two gymnasts to the first Games in 1896; they did not medal.

Games	Gymnasts	Events	Gold	Silver	Bronze	Total	Rank
1896 Athens	2	5	0	0	0	0	–
1900 Paris	2	1	0	0	0	0	–
1904 St. Louis	did not compete						
1908 London	5	1	0	0	0	0	–
1912 Stockholm	17	2	0	1	1	1	5
1920 Antwerp	did not participate						
1924 Paris	did not compete						
1928 Amsterdam	20	8	0	0	0	0	–
1932 Los Angeles	4	10	2	2	0	4	3
1936 Berlin	16	13	0	0	1	1	6
1948 London	16	13	1	2	3	6	3
1952 Helsinki	16	15	2	1	5	8	3
1956 Melbourne	8	14	4	2	1	7	2
1960 Rome	12	14	0	0	0	0	–
1964 Tokyo	12	14	0	1	1	2	6
1968 Mexico City	12	14	0	0	0	0	–
1972 Munich	12	14	0	0	1	1	4
1976 Montreal	12	14	1	0	1	2	4
1980 Moscow	12	14	1	0	1	2	4
1984 Los Angeles	did not participate						
1988 Seoul	12	14	1	0	0	1	6
1992 Barcelona	12	14	1	1	0	2	5
1996 Atlanta	10	13	0	1	0	1	12
2000 Sydney	3	8	1	0	0	1	4
2004 Athens	2	8	0	0	0	0	–
2008 Beijing	2	9	0	0	0	0	–
2012 London	3	6	1	0	0	1	6
2016 Rio de Janeiro	2	2	0	0	0	0	–
2020 Tokyo	2	2	0	0	0	0	–
2024 Paris	5	3	0	0	0	0	–
Total			15	11	14	40	7

==== Handball ====
Hungary men's national handball team

Games	Players	Round	Pos	Pld	W	D	L	GF	GA	GD
1936 Berlin	16	Final round	4th	5	1	0	4	25	64	−39
1948–1968	Sport not held									
1972 Munich	15	Match for 7th place	8th	6	2	0	4	110	101	+9
1976 Montreal	12	Match for 5th place	6th	5	2	0	3	111	103	+8
1980 Moscow	14	Bronze medal match	4th	6	3	2	1	114	108	+6
1984 Los Angeles	did not participate									
1988 Seoul	14	Bronze medal match	4th	6	3	0	3	125	120	+5
1992 Barcelona	15	Match for 7th place	7th	6	3	0	3	125	127	−2
1996–2000	Did not compete									
2004 Athens	15	Bronze medal match	4th	8	5	0	3	219	210	+9
2008 Beijing	Did not compete									
2012 London	16	Bronze medal match	4th	8	3	0	5	200	221	−21
2016–2020	Did not compete									
2024 Paris	17	Round robin	10th	5	1	0	4	137	138	−1
Total		9/14		55	23	2	30	1,166	1,192	−26

Hungary women's national handball team

Games	Players	Round	Pos	Pld	W	D	L	GF	GA	GD
1976 Montreal	14	Round robin	3rd	5	3	1	1	85	55	+30
1980 Moscow	14	Round robin	4th	5	1	1	3	80	74	+6
1984 Los Angeles	did not participate									
1988–1992	Did not compete									
1996 Atlanta	16	Bronze medal match	3rd	5	3	0	2	126	127	−1
2000 Sydney	15	Final	2nd	7	4	1	2	202	187	+15
2004 Athens	15	Match for 5th place	5th	7	5	1	1	215	178	+37
2008 Beijing	14	Bronze medal match	4th	8	3	1	4	211	227	−16
2012–2016	Did not compete									
2020 Tokyo	17	Quarter-finals	7th	6	2	0	4	164	175	−11
2024 Paris	17	Quarter-finals	6th	6	2	1	3	169	176	−7
Total		8/12		49	23	6	20	1,252	1,199	+53

==== Modern pentathlon ====
Games	Pentathletes	Events	Gold	Silver	Bronze	Total	Rank
1912–1924	did not compete						
1928 Amsterdam	1	1	0	0	0	0	–
1932 Los Angeles	3	1	0	0	0	0	–
1936 Berlin	3	1	0	0	0	0	–
1948 London	3	1	0	0	0	0	–
1952 Helsinki	3	2	1	1	1	3	1
1956 Melbourne	3	2	0	0	0	0	–
1960 Rome	3	2	2	1	0	3	1
1964 Tokyo	3	2	1	0	1	2	2
1968 Mexico City	3	2	1	1	0	2	1
1972 Munich	3	2	1	1	0	2	2
1976 Montreal	3	2	0	0	1	1	5
1980 Moscow	3	2	0	2	0	2	2
1984 Los Angeles	did not participate						
1988 Seoul	3	2	2	0	0	2	1
1992 Barcelona	3	2	0	1	0	1	3
1996 Atlanta	3	1	0	0	1	1	3
2000 Sydney	4	2	0	1	0	1	3
2004 Athens	4	2	1	0	0	1	1
2008 Beijing	4	2	0	0	0	0	–
2012 London	4	2	0	0	1	1	5
2016 Rio de Janeiro	4	2	0	0	0	0	–
2020 Tokyo	4	2	0	0	1	1	4
2024 Paris	4	2	1	0	0	1	1
Total			10	8	6	24	1

==== Shooting ====
Games	Shooters	Events	Gold	Silver	Bronze	Total	Rank
1896–1900	did not compete						
1904 St. Louis	Sport not held						
1908 London	2	1	0	0	0	0	–
1912 Stockholm	10	8	1	0	0	1	5
1920 Antwerp	did not participate						
1924 Paris	7	10	1	0	0	1	5
1928 Amsterdam	Sport not held						
1932 Los Angeles	3	1	0	0	1	1	5
1936 Berlin	8	3	0	1	0	1	4
1948 London	4	2	1	0	0	1	3
1952 Helsinki	6	5	1	1	1	3	3
1956 Melbourne	5	5	0	0	0	0	–
1960 Rome	10	6	0	0	0	0	–
1964 Tokyo	8	5	1	0	1	2	3
1968 Mexico City	6	5	0	1	0	1	7
1972 Munich	9	6	0	0	1	0	13
1976 Montreal	7	5	0	0	0	0	–
1980 Moscow	14	7	1	0	0	1	2
1984 Los Angeles	did not participate						
1988 Seoul	15	12	0	0	2	2	17
1992 Barcelona	18	13	0	0	0	0	–
1996 Atlanta	10	11	0	0	0	0	–
2000 Sydney	7	8	0	0	1	1	23
2004 Athens	8	11	1	0	0	1	8
2008 Beijing	5	9	0	0	0	0	–
2012 London	3	6	0	0	0	0	–
2016 Rio de Janeiro	8	8	0	0	0	0	–
2020 Tokyo	4	6	0	0	0	0	–
2024 Paris	5	7	0	0	1	1	15
Total			7	3	8	18	13

==== Swimming ====
Hungary first competed in swimming at the inaugural 1896 Games, with one swimmer (Alfréd Hajós) winning gold medals in both of the events he entered. Hungary also had one swimmer in 1900 taking a medal in every event he entered (Zoltán Halmay, with 2 silvers and a bronze). Hungary has won the fourth-most gold medals of any nation in swimming (28) and sixth-most total medals (73).

Games	Swimmers	Events	Gold	Silver	Bronze	Total	Rank
1896 Athens	1	2	2	0	0	2	1
1900 Paris	1	3	0	2	1	3	6
1904 St. Louis	2	4	2	1	1	4	3
1908 London	10	5	0	2	0	2	4
1912 Stockholm	8	7	0	0	0	0	–
1920 Antwerp	did not participate						
1924 Paris	6	4	0	0	1	1	6
1928 Amsterdam	8	4	0	1	0	1	9
1932 Los Angeles	5	3	0	0	1	1	7
1936 Berlin	13	9	1	0	1	2	4
1948 London	15	10	0	1	3	4	5
1952 Helsinki	15	10	4	2	1	7	2
1956 Melbourne	16	13	0	1	1	2	6
1960 Rome	18	15	0	0	0	0	–
1964 Tokyo	19	16	0	0	0	0	–
1968 Mexico City	14	18	0	0	0	0	–
1972 Munich	16	20	0	1	2	3	9
1976 Montreal	8	8	0	0	0	0	–
1980 Moscow	13	17	1	2	1	4	6
1984 Los Angeles	did not participate						
1988 Seoul	13	16	4	2	0	6	3
1992 Barcelona	13	19	5	3	1	9	3
1996 Atlanta	21	26	3	1	2	6	3
2000 Sydney	18	24	1	0	0	1	8
2004 Athens	25	27	0	1	1	2	14
2008 Beijing	28	29	0	3	0	3	15
2012 London	32	34	2	0	1	3	6
2016 Rio de Janeiro	35	31	3	2	2	7	3
2020 Tokyo	34	28	1	2	0	3	8
2024 Paris	23	27	3	1	1	5	5
Total			31	27	21	79	4

==== Volleyball ====
Hungary men's national volleyball team

Games	Players	Round	Pos	Pld	W	L	SW	SL	PW	PL
1964 Tokyo	12	Round robin	6th	9	4	5	18	18	449	466
1968–Present	Did not compete									
Total		1/15		9	4	5	18	18	449	466

Hungary women's national volleyball team

Games	Players	Round	Pos	Pld	W	L	SW	SL	PW	PL
1964–1968	did not compete									
1972 Munich	12	Match for 5th place	5th	5	3	2	10	10	256	252
1976 Montreal	12	Bronze medal match	4th	5	2	3	7	11	192	234
1980 Moscow	12	Bronze medal match	4th	5	2	3	10	12	234	279
1984 Los Angeles	did not participate									
1988–Present	Did not compete									
Total		3/15		15	7	8	27	33	682	765

==== Water polo ====
Hungary men's national water polo team

Games	Players	Round	Pos	Pld	W	D	L	GF	GA	GD
1900–1908	Did not compete									
1912 Stockholm	7	First round	5th	2	0	0	2	9	11	−2
1920 Antwerp	did not participate									
1924 Paris	8	Quarter-finals	5th	4	2	0	2	17	17	0
1928 Amsterdam	7	Final	2nd	4	3	0	1	26	8	+18
1932 Los Angeles	10	Group stage	1st	3	3	0	0	31	2	+29
1936 Berlin	11	Final round	1st	7	6	1	0	44	4	+40
1948 London	10	Final round	2nd	7	5	1	1	35	19	+16
1952 Helsinki	13	Final round	1st	8	6	2	0	53	16	+37
1956 Melbourne	12	Final round	1st	6	6	0	0	26	4	+22
1960 Rome	11	Final round	3rd	7	4	2	1	37	18	+19
1964 Tokyo	12	Final round	1st	6	5	1	0	34	14	+20
1968 Mexico City	11	Bronze medal match	3rd	8	7	0	1	54	26	+28
1972 Munich	11	Final round	2nd	8	6	2	0	42	21	+21
1976 Montreal	11	Final round	1st	8	7	1	0	45	32	+13
1980 Moscow	11	Final round	3rd	8	5	1	2	51	44	+7
1984 Los Angeles	did not participate									
1988 Seoul	13	5th–8th placement	5th	7	3	2	2	72	57	+15
1992 Barcelona	13	5th–8th placement	6th	7	3	2	2	65	62	+3
1996 Atlanta	13	Bronze medal match	4th	8	6	0	2	83	73	+10
2000 Sydney	13	Final	1st	8	6	0	2	78	57	+21
2004 Athens	13	Final	1st	7	7	0	0	59	39	+20
2008 Beijing	13	Final	1st	7	6	1	0	85	55	+30
2012 London	13	Match for 5th place	5th	8	5	0	3	98	80	+18
2016 Rio de Janeiro	13	Match for 5th place	5th	8	4	4	0	93	70	+23
2020 Tokyo	13	Bronze medal match	3rd	8	5	1	2	94	60	+34
2024 Paris	13	Bronze medal match	4th	8	4	0	4	90	84	+6
Total		24/29		162	114	20	28	1,319	866	+453

Hungary women's national water polo team

Games	Players	Round	Pos	Pld	W	D	L	GF	GA	GD
2000 Sydney	Did not compete									
2004 Athens	13	Match for 5th place	6th	5	1	0	4	35	40	−5
2008 Beijing	13	Bronze medal match	4th	5	2	2	1	44	37	+7
2012 London	13	Bronze medal match	4th	6	2	0	4	66	70	−4
2016 Rio de Janeiro	13	Bronze medal match	4th	6	2	0	4	70	77	−7
2020 Tokyo	13	Bronze medal match	3rd	7	4	1	2	77	71	+6
2024 Paris	13	Match for 5th place	5th	7	4	0	3	77	63	+14
Total		6/7		36	15	3	18	369	358	+11

==== Weightlifting ====
Hungary first competed in weightlifting at the inaugural 1896 Games, with one lifter competing in one event.

Games	Lifters	Events	Gold	Silver	Bronze	Total	Rank
1896 Athens	1	1	0	0	0	0	–
1900 Paris	Sport not held						
1904 St. Louis	did not compete						
1908–1912	Sport not held						
1920 Antwerp	did not participate						
1924–1932	did not compete						
1936 Berlin	2	2	0	0	0	0	–
1948 London	3	3	0	0	0	0	–
1952 Helsinki	2	2	0	0	0	0	–
1956 Melbourne	did not participate						
1960 Rome	5	4	0	0	1	1	6
1964 Tokyo	7	5	0	2	1	3	5
1968 Mexico City	7	6	0	1	1	2	6
1972 Munich	9	7	1	1	3	5	3
1976 Montreal	9	5	0	1	1	2	5
1980 Moscow	10	6	1	0	1	2	3
1984 Los Angeles	did not participate						
1988 Seoul	10	7	0	2	0	2	5
1992 Barcelona	10	6	0	0	0	0	–
1996 Atlanta	7	5	0	0	1	1	11
2000 Sydney	7	7	0	1	0	1	15
2004 Athens	7	6	0	1	0	1	11
2008 Beijing	1	1	0	0	0	0	–
2012 London	1	1	0	0	0	0	–
2016 Rio de Janeiro	1	1	0	0	0	0	–
2020 Tokyo	1	1	0	0	0	0	–
2024 Paris	did not compete						
Total			2	9	9	20	22

==== Wrestling ====
Hungary first competed in wrestling at the inaugural 1896 Games, with one wrestler competing in the open weight class event.

Games	Wrestlers	Events	Gold	Silver	Bronze	Total	Rank
1896 Athens	1	1	0	0	0	0	–
1900 Paris	Sport not held						
1904 St. Louis	did not compete						
1908 London	7	4	1	0	0	1	5
1912 Stockholm	10	4	0	0	1	1	5
1920 Antwerp	did not participate						
1924 Paris	12	6	0	1	1	2	7
1928 Amsterdam	6	6	1	1	0	2	6
1932 Los Angeles	5	5	0	2	1	3	7
1936 Berlin	12	12	3	0	1	4	2
1948 London	12	12	1	1	2	4	4
1952 Helsinki	12	12	2	1	1	4	3
1956 Melbourne	8	8	0	1	1	2	8
1960 Rome	10	10	0	1	0	1	8
1964 Tokyo	12	12	2	0	0	2	5
1968 Mexico City	15	15	2	0	2	4	4
1972 Munich	19	19	1	0	4	5	6
1976 Montreal	18	19	0	1	1	2	10
1980 Moscow	19	19	2	3	2	7	3
1984 Los Angeles	did not participate						
1988 Seoul	18	18	1	1	0	2	7
1992 Barcelona	17	17	2	0	0	2	6
1996 Atlanta	11	11	0	0	0	0	–
2000 Sydney	8	8	0	1	0	1	12
2004 Athens	9	9	1	0	0	1	8
2008 Beijing	9	9	0	1	0	1	17
2012 London	7	7	0	1	2	3	9
2016 Rio de Janeiro	8	8	0	0	0	0	–
2020 Tokyo	6	6	1	1	0	2	7
2024 Paris	5	5	0	0	0	0	-
Total			20	17	19	56	8

=== Tennis ===
Hungary first competed in tennis at the inaugural 1896 Games, with one player in the men's singles earning a bronze medal. It remains (through the 2016 Games) the only tennis medal won by Hungary.

Games	Athletes	Events	Gold	Silver	Bronze	Total
1896 Athens	1	1/2	0	0	1	1
Total			0	0	1	1

=== Winter Olympic Sports ===
- Updated after 2022 Winter Olympics

==== Alpine skiing ====
Games	Skiers	Events	Gold	Silver	Bronze	Total	Rank
1936 Garmisch-Partenkirchen	4	2	0	0	0	0	–
1948 St. Moritz	7	6	0	0	0	0	–
1952 Oslo	2	5	0	0	0	0	–
1956–1960	did not compete						
1964 Innsbruck	1	3	0	0	0	0	–
1968–1980	did not compete						
1984 Sarajevo	1	2	0	0	0	0	–
1988 Calgary	did not compete						
1992 Albertville	6	8	0	0	0	0	–
1994 Lillehammer	5	8	0	0	0	0	–
1998 Nagano	3	5	0	0	0	0	–
2002 Salt Lake City	2	5	0	0	0	0	–
2006 Turin	2	4	0	0	0	0	–
2010 Vancouver	3	7	0	0	0	0	–
2014 Sochi	3	7	0	0	0	0	–
2018 Pyeongchang	4	7	0	0	0	0	–
2022 Beijing	2	4	0	0	0	0	–
Total			0	0	0	0	–

==== Biathlon ====
Games	Skiers	Events	Gold	Silver	Bronze	Total	Rank
1960 Squaw Valley	1	1	0	0	0	0	–
1964–1980	did not compete						
1984 Sarajevo	5	3	0	0	0	0	–
1988 Calgary	1	2	0	0	0	0	–
1992 Albertville	9	6	0	0	0	0	–
1994 Lillehammer	5	5	0	0	0	0	–
1998 Nagano	5	3	0	0	0	0	–
2002 Salt Lake City	3	4	0	0	0	0	–
2006 Turin	2	4	0	0	0	0	–
2010 Vancouver	1	2	0	0	0	0	–
2014 Sochi	2	4	0	0	0	0	–
2018–Present	did not compete						
Total			0	0	0	0	–

==== Bobsleigh ====
Games	Sledders	Events	Gold	Silver	Bronze	Total	Rank
1924–1956	did not compete						
1960 Squaw Valley	Sport not held						
1964–1992	did not compete						
1994 Lillehammer	2	1	0	0	0	0	–
1998 Nagano	4	1	0	0	0	0	–
2002 Salt Lake City	7	2	0	0	0	0	–
2006 Turin	4	2	0	0	0	0	–
2010–Present	did not compete						
Total			0	0	0	0	–

==== Cross-country skiing ====
Games	Skiers	Events	Gold	Silver	Bronze	Total	Rank
1924 Chamonix	3	2	0	0	0	0	–
1928 St. Moritz	2	1	0	0	0	0	–
1932–1936	did not compete						
1948 St. Moritz	2	1	0	0	0	0	–
1952 Oslo	2	2	0	0	0	0	–
1956 Cortina d'Ampezzo	did not compete						
1960 Squaw Valley	2	3	0	0	0	0	–
1964 Innsbruck	3	3	0	0	0	0	–
1968 Grenoble	3	5	0	0	0	0	–
1972–1984	did not compete						
1988 Calgary	1	2	0	0	0	0	–
1992 Albertville	2	5	0	0	0	0	–
1994 Lillehammer	did not compete						
1998 Nagano	1	1	0	0	0	0	–
2002 Salt Lake City	4	5	0	0	0	0	–
2006 Turin	2	3	0	0	0	0	–
2010 Vancouver	2	2	0	0	0	0	–
2014 Sochi	2	4	0	0	0	0	–
2018 Pyeongchang	2	3	0	0	0	0	–
2022 Beijing	2	4	0	0	0	0	–
Total			0	0	0	0	–

==== Figure skating ====
Games	Skaters	Events	Gold	Silver	Bronze	Total	Rank
1908–1928	did not compete						
1932 Lake Placid	4	1	0	0	1	1	6
1936 Garmisch-Partenkirchen	7	3	0	0	1	1	5
1948 St. Moritz	6	3	0	1	0	1	5
1952 Oslo	6	3	0	0	1	1	5
1956 Cortina d'Ampezzo	2	1	0	0	1	1	4
1960 Squaw Valley	did not compete						
1964 Innsbruck	2	2	0	0	0	0	–
1968 Grenoble	2	2	0	0	0	0	–
1972 Sapporo	1	1	0	0	0	0	–
1976 Innsbruck	3	2	0	0	0	0	–
1980 Lake Placid	2	1	0	1	0	1	5
1984 Sarajevo	2	1	0	0	0	0	–
1988 Calgary	3	2	0	0	0	0	–
1992 Albertville	5	2	0	0	0	0	–
1994 Lillehammer	3	2	0	0	0	0	–
1998 Nagano	2	2	0	0	0	0	–
2002 Salt Lake City	2	2	0	0	0	0	–
2006 Turin	5	3	0	0	0	0	–
2010 Vancouver	3	2	0	0	0	0	–
2014 Sochi	did not compete						
2018 Pyeongchang	1	1	0	0	0	0	–
2022 Beijing	2	1	0	0	0	0	–
Total			0	2	4	6	25

==== Freestyle skiing ====
Games	Skiers	Events	Gold	Silver	Bronze	Total	Rank
1992–2014	did not compete						
2018 Pyeongchang	1	0	0	0	0	0	–
2022–Present	did not compete						
Total			0	0	0	0	–

==== Ice hockey ====
Hungary men's national ice hockey team

Games	Players	Finish	Rank	GP	W	T	L	GF	GA
1920 Antwerp	did not participate								
1924 Chamonix	Did not compete								
1928 St. Moritz	11	First round	11th	3	0	0	3	2	6
1932 Lake Placid	Did not compete								
1936 Garmisch-Partenkirchen	14	Second round	7th	6	2	0	4	16	27
1948–1960	Did not compete								
1964 Innsbruck	17	Second round	16th	7	0	0	7	14	39
1968–Present	Did not compete								
Total		3/25		16	2	0	14	32	72

==== Nordic combined ====
Games	Skiers	Events	Gold	Silver	Bronze	Total	Rank
1924 Chamonix	3	1	0	0	0	0	–
1928 St. Moritz	1	1	0	0	0	0	–
1932 Lake Placid	did not compete						
1936 Garmisch-Partenkirchen	2	1	0	0	0	0	–
1948–Present	did not compete						
Total			0	0	0	0	–

==== Short track speed skating ====
Games	Skaters	Events	Gold	Silver	Bronze	Total	Rank
1992 Albertville	2	2	0	0	0	0	–
1994–1998	did not compete						
2002 Salt Lake City	6	6	0	0	0	0	–
2006 Turin	4	6	0	0	0	0	–
2010 Vancouver	7	7	0	0	0	0	–
2014 Sochi	8	7	0	0	0	0	–
2018 Pyeongchang	10	8	1	0	0	1	6
2022 Beijing	7	7	1	0	2	3	6
Total			2	0	2	4	8

==== Ski jumping ====
Games	Skiers	Events	Gold	Silver	Bronze	Total	Rank
1924 Chamonix	2^{1}	0	0	0	0	0	–
1928–1932	did not compete						
1936 Garmisch-Partenkirchen	2^{1}	0	0	0	0	0	–
1948 St. Moritz	2	1	0	0	0	0	–
1952 Oslo–1956	did not compete						
1960 Squaw Valley	1	1	0	0	0	0	–
1964 Innsbruck	2	2	0	0	0	0	–
1968 Grenoble	2	2	0	0	0	0	–
1972–Present	did not compete						
Total			0	0	0	0	–

- ^{1} Athletes did not start at the Games.

==== Snowboarding ====
Games	Boarders	Events	Gold	Silver	Bronze	Total	Rank
1998–2018	did not compete						
2022 Beijing	1	3	0	0	0	0	–
Total			0	0	0	0	–

==== Speed skating ====
Games	Skaters	Events	Gold	Silver	Bronze	Total	Rank
1924 Chamonix	did not compete						
1928 St. Moritz	1	3	0	0	0	0	–
1932 Lake Placid	did not compete						
1936 Garmisch-Partenkirchen	1	3	0	0	0	0	–
1948 St. Moritz	5	4	0	0	0	0	–
1952 Oslo	2	4	0	0	0	0	–
1956–1960	did not compete						
1964 Innsbruck	3	7	0	0	0	0	–
1968 Grenoble	3	4	0	0	0	0	–
1972–1980	did not compete						
1984 Sarajevo	1	2	0	0	0	0	–
1988 Calgary	did not compete						
1992 Albertville	2	6	0	0	0	0	–
1994 Lillehammer	1	2	0	0	0	0	–
1998 Nagano	2	6	0	0	0	0	–
2002 Salt Lake City	2	6	0	0	0	0	–
2006–2010 Vancouver	2	2	0	0	0	0	–
2014 Sochi	1	1	0	0	0	0	–
2018 Pyeongchang	1	2	0	0	0	0	–
2022 Beijing	did not compete						
Total			0	0	0	0	–

== See also ==
- Category:Olympic competitors for Hungary
- Hungary at the Paralympics
- List of Hungarian Olympic champions
