= Hungary at the 2018 Winter Olympics =

- Flag of Hungary
- IOC code: HUN
- NOC: Hungarian Olympic Committee
- Website: www.olimpia.hu (in Hungarian)

in Pyeongchang, South Korea 9–25 February 2018
- Competitors: 19 in 6 sports
- Flag bearer: Konrád Nagy
- Medals Ranked 21st: Gold 1 Silver 0 Bronze 0 Total 1

Winter Olympics appearances (overview)
- 1924; 1928; 1932; 1936; 1948; 1952; 1956; 1960; 1964; 1968; 1972; 1976; 1980; 1984; 1988; 1992; 1994; 1998; 2002; 2006; 2010; 2014; 2018; 2022; 2026

Hungary competed at the 2018 Winter Olympics in PyeongChang, South Korea, from 9 to 25 February 2018. With the men's 5000 metre relay victory in short track speed skating, the nation had won its first ever Winter Olympic gold, and first Winter medal since 1980. Hungarian athletes have participated in all Winter Olympic Games.

== Medalists ==
Medal	Name	Sport	Event	Date
Gold	Csaba Burján; Viktor Knoch; Shaoang Liu; Shaolin Sándor Liu	Short track speed skating	Men's 5000 metre relay	22 February

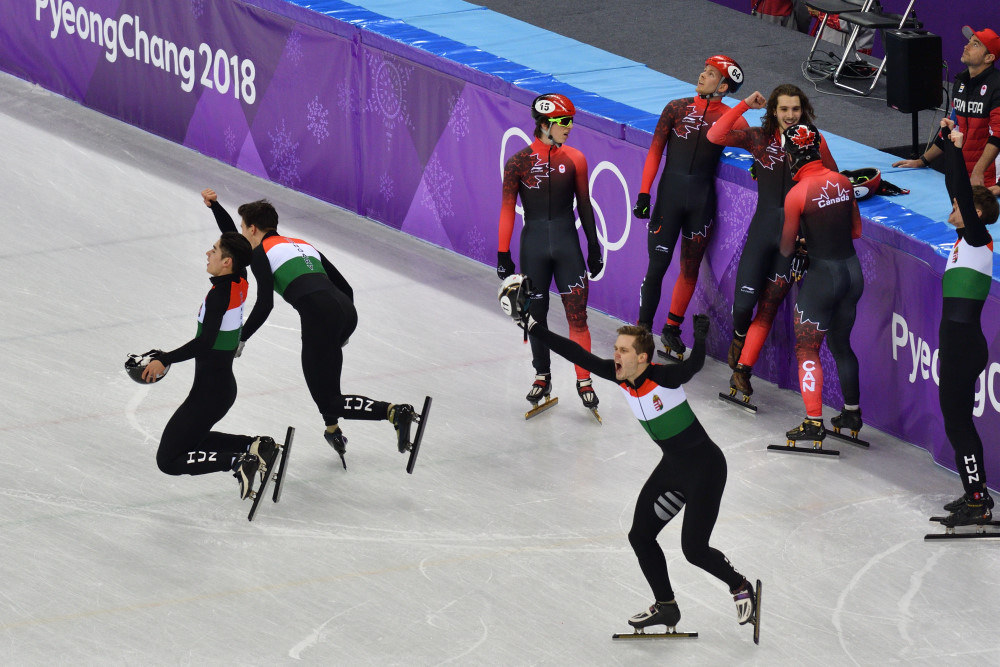
Short Track Team celebrating their victory in the 5000 metre relay

== Competitors ==
The following is the list of number of competitors participating at the Games per sport/discipline.

Sport	Men	Women	Total
Alpine skiing	2	2	4
Cross-country skiing	1	1	2
Figure skating	0	1	1
Freestyle skiing	0	1	1
Short track speed skating	5	5	10
Speed skating	1	0	1
Total	9	10	19

== Alpine skiing ==
Hungary qualified four athletes, two male and two female, and one team.

Athlete	Event	Run 1		Run 2		Total	
Athlete	Event	Time	Rank	Time	Rank	Time	Rank
Márton Kékesi	Men's downhill	—N/a				1:51.72	53
Márton Kékesi	Men's super-G	—N/a				DNF	
Márton Kékesi	Men's giant slalom	1:16.64	53	1:15.22	40	2:31.86	42
Márton Kékesi	Men's combined	1:26.08	62	53.94	29	2:20.02	35
Dalibor Šamšal	Men's giant slalom	1:16.09	51	1:16.79	50	2:32.88	44
Dalibor Šamšal	Men's combined	1:25.17	60	2:20.02	29	2:15.47	32
Szonja Hozmann	Women's giant slalom	1:21.77	54	1:17.62	49	2:39.39	49
Szonja Hozmann	Women's slalom	DNF					
Mariann Mimi Maróty	Women's giant slalom	1:29.74	65	DSQ			
Mariann Mimi Maróty	Women's slalom	1:09.95	58	1:02.83	52	2:12.78	53

Mixed

Athlete	Event	Round of 16	Quarterfinals	Semifinals	Final / BM	
Athlete	Event	Opposition Result	Opposition Result	Opposition Result	Opposition Result	Rank
Márton Kékesi; Dalibor Šamšal; Szonja Hozmann; Mariann Mimi Maróty	Team event	Switzerland; L 0–4	Did not advance			

== Cross-country skiing ==
Hungary qualified two athletes, one male and one female.

Distance

Athlete	Event	Final		
Athlete	Event	Time	Deficit	Rank
Ádám Kónya	Men's 15 km freestyle	39:27.2	+5:43.3	89
Emőke Szőcs	Women's 10 km freestyle	31:04.6	+6:04.1	77

Sprint

Athlete	Event	Qualification		Quarterfinal		Semifinal		Final	
Athlete	Event	Time	Rank	Time	Rank	Time	Rank	Time	Rank
Ádám Kónya	Men's sprint	3:31.84	67	Did not advance					

== Figure skating ==
Hungary qualified one female figure skater, based on its placement at the 2017 World Figure Skating Championships in Helsinki, Finland.

Athlete	Event	SP		FS		Total	
Athlete	Event	Points	Rank	Points	Rank	Points	Rank
Ivett Tóth	Ladies' singles	53.22	23 Q	97.21	23	150.43	23

== Freestyle skiing ==
Halfpipe

Athlete	Event	Qualification				Final				
Athlete	Event	Run 1	Run 2	Best	Rank	Run 1	Run 2	Run 3	Best	Rank
Elizabeth Swaney	Women's halfpipe	30.00	31.40	31.40	24	Did not advance				

== Short track speed skating ==
According to the ISU Special Olympic Qualification Rankings, Hungary qualified a full squad of 5 men and 5 women each.

Men

Athlete	Event	Heat		Quarterfinal		Semifinal		Final	
Athlete	Event	Time	Rank	Time	Rank	Time	Rank	Time	Rank
Csaba Burján	1500 m	2:19.284	5	—N/a		Did not advance			
Viktor Knoch	500 m	1:06.040	4	Did not advance					
Shaoang Liu	500 m	40.526	1 Q	PEN		did not advance			
Shaoang Liu	1000 m	PEN		did not advance					
Shaoang Liu	1500 m	2:14.160	3 Q	—N/a		PEN		Did not advance	
Shaolin Sándor Liu	500 m	40.650	1 Q	40.471	2 Q	40.399	3 FB	40.651	5
Shaolin Sándor Liu	1000 m	1:31.547	1 Q	1:24.012	1 Q	1:26.488	2 FA	PEN	8
Shaolin Sándor Liu	1500 m	2:12.835	1 Q	—N/a		2:45.709	5 AA	2:11.520	5
Csaba Burján; Viktor Knoch; Shaoang Liu; Shaolin Sándor Liu	5000 m relay	—N/a				6:34.866	2 FA	6:31.971 OR	1st place, gold medalist(s)

Women

Athlete	Event	Heat		Quarterfinal		Semifinal		Final	
Athlete	Event	Time	Rank	Time	Rank	Time	Rank	Time	Rank
Sára Bácskai	1500 m	PEN		—N/a		Did not advance			
Petra Jászapáti	500 m	55.641	2 Q	43.043	4	did not advance			
Petra Jászapáti	1000 m	1:29.838	4	Did not advance					
Petra Jászapáti	1500 m	2:25.022	2 Q	—N/a		2:23.210	2 Q	2:26.138	6
Andrea Keszler	500 m	43.274	2 Q	43.053	3	did not advance			
Sára Bácskai; Bernadett Heidum; Petra Jászapáti; Andrea Keszler	3000 m relay	—N/a				4:09.555	3 FB	4:03.603	4

Qualification legend: ADV – Advanced due to being impeded by another skater; FA – Qualify to medal round; FB – Qualify to consolation round; AA – Advance to medal round due to being impeded by another skaterround

== Speed skating ==
Hungary earned the following quotas at the conclusion of the four World Cups used for qualification.

Athlete	Event	Final	
Athlete	Event	Time	Rank
Konrád Nagy	Men's 1000 m	1:09.92	21
Konrád Nagy	Men's 1500 m	1:49.01	29
