= Hungary at the 1972 Winter Olympics =

- IOC code: HUN
- NOC: Hungarian Olympic Committee
- Website: www.olimpia.hu (in Hungarian and English)

in Sapporo
- Competitors: 1 in 1 sport
- Flag bearer: Zsuzsa Almássy (figure skating)
- Medals: Gold 0 Silver 0 Bronze 0 Total 0

Winter Olympics appearances (overview)
- 1924; 1928; 1932; 1936; 1948; 1952; 1956; 1960; 1964; 1968; 1972; 1976; 1980; 1984; 1988; 1992; 1994; 1998; 2002; 2006; 2010; 2014; 2018; 2022; 2026

Hungary competed at the 1972 Winter Olympics in Sapporo, Japan.

== Figure skating ==
Women

Athlete	CF	FS	Points	Places	Rank
Zsuzsa Almássy	5	4	2592.4	47	5
