= Hungary at the 1988 Winter Olympics =

- IOC code: HUN
- NOC: Hungarian Olympic Committee
- Website: www.olimpia.hu (in Hungarian and English)

in Calgary
- Competitors: 5 (3 men and 2 women) in 3 sports
- Flag bearer: Attila Tóth (figure skating)
- Officials: Klára Engi
- Medals: Gold 0 Silver 0 Bronze 0 Total 0

Winter Olympics appearances (overview)
- 1924; 1928; 1932; 1936; 1948; 1952; 1956; 1960; 1964; 1968; 1972; 1976; 1980; 1984; 1988; 1992; 1994; 1998; 2002; 2006; 2010; 2014; 2018; 2022; 2026

Hungary was represented at the 1988 Winter Olympics in Calgary, Alberta, Canada by the Hungarian Olympic Committee.

In total, five athletes represented Hungary in three different sports including biathlon, cross-country skiing and figure skating.

== Competitors ==
In total, five athletes represented Hungary at the 1988 Winter Olympics in Calgary, Alberta, Canada across three different sports.

Sport	Men	Women	Total
Biathlon	1	–	1
Cross-country skiing	1	0	1
Figure skating	1	2	3
Total	3	2	5

== Biathlon ==
One Hungarian athlete participated in the biathlon events – Zsolt Kovács in the sprint and the individual.

The individual took place on 20 February 1988. Kovács completed the course in one hour two minutes 15.2 seconds but with four shooting misses for an adjusted time of one hour six minutes 15.2 seconds to finish 54th overall.

The sprint took place on 23 February 1988. Kovács completed the course in 28 minutes 13.9 seconds with no shooting misses to finish 48th overall.

Men

Event	Athlete	Misses ^{1}	Time	Rank
10 km Sprint	Zsolt Kovács	0	28:13.9	48

Event	Athlete	Time	Misses	Adjusted time ^{2}	Rank
20 km	Zsolt Kovács	1'02:15.2	4	1'06:15.2	54

^{1} A penalty loop of 150 metres had to be skied per missed target.
^{2} One minute added per missed target.

== Cross-country skiing ==
One Hungarian athlete participated in the cross-country skiing events – Gábor Mayer in the men's 15 km classical and 30 km classical.

The men's 30 km classicaltook place on 15 February 1988. Mayer completed the course in one hour 39 minutes 3.5 seconds to finish 63rd overall.

The men's 15 km classical took place on 19 February 1988. Mayer completed the course in 47 minutes 56.2 seconds to finish 57th overall.

Men

Event	Athlete	Race	
Event	Athlete	Time	Rank
15 km C	Gábor Mayer	47:56.2	57
30 km C	Gábor Mayer	1'39:03.5	63

C = Classical style, F = Freestyle

== Figure skating ==
Three Hungarian athletes participated in the figure skating events – Tamara Téglássy in the women's singles and Klára Engi and Attila Tóth in the ice dance.

The ice dance took place from 21 to 23 February 1988. Engi and Tóth finished seventh overall.

The women's singles took place on 24, 25 and 27 February 1988. Téglássy finished 19th overall.

Women

Athlete	CF	SP	FS	TFP	Rank
Tamara Téglássy	19	22	15	35.2	19

Ice Dancing

Athletes	CD	OD	FD	TFP	Rank
Klára Engi; Attila Tóth	7	7	7	14.0	7
