= Hungary at the 1960 Winter Olympics =

- IOC code: HUN
- NOC: Hungarian Olympic Committee
- Website: www.olimpia.hu (in Hungarian and English)

in Squaw Valley, United States February 18–28, 1960
- Competitors: 3 (2 men and 1 woman) in 3 sports
- Flag bearer: János Bartha
- Medals: Gold 0 Silver 0 Bronze 0 Total 0

Winter Olympics appearances (overview)
- 1924; 1928; 1932; 1936; 1948; 1952; 1956; 1960; 1964; 1968; 1972; 1976; 1980; 1984; 1988; 1992; 1994; 1998; 2002; 2006; 2010; 2014; 2018; 2022; 2026

Hungary competed at the 1960 Winter Olympics in Squaw Valley, United States.

== Biathlon ==
Men

Event	Athlete	Time	Missed targets	Adjusted time ^{1}	Rank
Pál Sajgó	20 km	1'34:27.3	14	2'02:27.3	26

^{1} Two minutes added per missed target.

== Cross-country skiing ==
Men

Event	Athlete	Race	
Event	Athlete	Time	Rank
15 km	Pál Sajgó	57:02.9	34
50 km	Pál Sajgó	DNF	–

Women

Event	Athlete	Race	
Event	Athlete	Time	Rank
10 km	Magdolna Bartha	47:23.2	23

== Ski jumping ==
Athlete	Event	Jump 1			Jump 2			Total	
Athlete	Event	Distance	Points	Rank	Distance	Points	Rank	Points	Rank
Tamás Sudár	Normal hill	73.5	84.1	41	64.0	81.7	42	165.8	41

== Sources ==
- Official Olympic Reports
- International Olympic Committee results database
- Olympic Winter Games 1960, full results by sports-reference.com
