= Hungary at the 2006 Winter Olympics =

- IOC code: HUN
- NOC: Hungarian Olympic Committee
- Website: www.olimpia.hu (in Hungarian and English)

in Turin
- Competitors: 19 (11 men and 8 women) in 6 sports
- Flag bearers: Rózsa Darázs (opening); Erika Huszár (closing)
- Medals: Gold 0 Silver 0 Bronze 0 Total 0

Winter Olympics appearances (overview)
- 1924; 1928; 1932; 1936; 1948; 1952; 1956; 1960; 1964; 1968; 1972; 1976; 1980; 1984; 1988; 1992; 1994; 1998; 2002; 2006; 2010; 2014; 2018; 2022; 2026

Hungary competed at the 2006 Winter Olympics in Turin, Italy.

== Alpine skiing ==
Athlete	Event	Final				
Athlete	Event	Run 1	Run 2	Run 3	Total	Rank
Attila Marosi	Men's giant slalom	1:32.30	1:32.82	n/a	3:05.12	38
Attila Marosi	Men's slalom	1:07.67	1:02.61	n/a	2:10.28	42
Reka Tuss	Women's giant slalom	1:16.12	1:23.70	n/a	2:39.82	41
Reka Tuss	Women's slalom	53.76	57.83	n/a	1:51.59	49

== Biathlon ==
Athlete	Event	Final		
Athlete	Event	Time	Misses	Rank
Zsofia Gottschall	Women's sprint	31:09.1	6	82
Zsofia Gottschall	Women's individual	1:08:17.3	8	80
Imre Tagscherer	Men's sprint	30:38.1	3	76
Imre Tagscherer	Men's individual	1:05:11.1	7	78

== Bobsleigh ==
Athlete	Event	Final					
Athlete	Event	Run 1	Run 2	Run 3	Run 4	Total	Rank
Márton Gyulai; Bertalan Pintér	Two-man	57.25	57.36	58.40	did not advance		29
Márton Gyulai; Zsolt Kürtösi; Tamás Margl; Bertalan Pintér	Four-man	56.99	56.73	56.45	did not advance		24

== Cross-country skiing ==
Distance

Athlete	Event	Final	
Athlete	Event	Total	Rank
Leila Gyenesei	Women's 10 km classical	36:43.0	69
Zoltán Tagscherer	Men's 15 kilometre classical	45:20.3	77

Sprint

Athlete	Event	Qualifying		Quarterfinal		Semifinal		Final	
Athlete	Event	Total	Rank	Total	Rank	Total	Rank	Total	Rank
Zoltán Tagscherer	Men's sprint	2:22.69	44	Did not advance					44

== Figure skating ==
Athlete	Event	CD		SP/OD		FS/FD		Total	
Athlete	Event	Points	Rank	Points	Rank	Points	Rank	Points	Rank
Júlia Sebestyén	Ladies'	n/a		49.58	16 Q	79.68	20	129.26	18
Viktória Pavuk	Ladies'	n/a		46.40	19 Q	73.45	23	119.85	23
Zoltán Tóth	Men's	n/a		55.07	24 Q	90.40	24	145.47	24
Attila Elek; Nóra Hoffmann	Ice dance	27.53	19	44.04	18	79.90	16	149.47	17

Key: CD = Compulsory Dance, FD = Free Dance, FS = Free Skate, OD = Original Dance, SP = Short Program

== Short track speed skating ==
Athlete	Event	Heat		Quarterfinal		Semifinal		Final	
Athlete	Event	Time	Rank	Time	Rank	Time	Rank	Time	Rank
Peter Darazs	Men's 500 m	42.929	2 Q	1:01.289	3	did not advance			10
Peter Darazs	Men's 1000 m	1:27.929	3 Q	1:28.738	4	did not advance			12
Peter Darazs	Men's 1500 m	2:30.281	3 Q	n/a		2:18.348	4	Final B 2:24.969	11
Rozsa Darazs	Women's 500 m	1:10.558	3	did not advance					22
Rozsa Darazs	Women's 1000 m	1:34.059	4	did not advance					21
Rozsa Darazs	Women's 1500 m	2:42.256	4	did not advance					20
Erika Huszar	Women's 500 m	46.113	2 Q	45.382	4	did not advance			13
Erika Huszar	Women's 1000 m	1:36.515	2 Q	1:34.080	3	did not advance			11
Erika Huszar	Women's 1500 m	2:35.920	2 Q	n/a		2:32.504	2 Q	2:25.405	4
Viktor Knoch	Men's 1500 m	2:23.876	3 Q	n/a		2:19.600	2	2:26.806	5

Key: 'ADV' indicates a skater was advanced due to being interfered with.
