= Hungary at the 1994 Winter Olympics =

- IOC code: HUN
- NOC: Hungarian Olympic Committee
- Website: www.olimpia.hu (in Hungarian and English)

in Lillehammer
- Competitors: 16 in 5 sports
- Flag bearer: Attila Bónis
- Officials: Krisztina Czakó; Attila Bónis
- Medals: Gold 0 Silver 0 Bronze 0 Total 0

Winter Olympics appearances (overview)
- 1924; 1928; 1932; 1936; 1948; 1952; 1956; 1960; 1964; 1968; 1972; 1976; 1980; 1984; 1988; 1992; 1994; 1998; 2002; 2006; 2010; 2014; 2018; 2022; 2026

Hungary competed at the 1994 Winter Olympics in Lillehammer, Norway.

== Competitors ==
The following is the list of number of competitors in the Games.

Sport	Men	Women	Total
Alpine skiing	1	4	5
Biathlon	1	4	5
Bobsleigh	2	–	2
Figure skating	1	2	3
Speed skating	0	1	1
Total	5	11	16

== Alpine skiing ==
Men

Athlete	Event	Final				
Athlete	Event	Run 1	Run 2	Run 3	Total	Rank
Attila Bónis	Super-G				1:38.83	45
Attila Bónis	Slalom	1:10.87	1:09.56		2:20.43	22
Attila Bónis	Combined	1:43.85	56.85	54.06	3:34.76	30

Women

Athlete	Event	Final				
Athlete	Event	Run 1	Run 2	Run 3	Total	Rank
Szvetlana Keszthelyi	Downhill				1:43.33	39
Szvetlana Keszthelyi	Super-G				1:30.21	41
Szvetlana Keszthelyi	Slalom	1:06.09	1:02.91		2:09.00	25
Szvetlana Keszthelyi	Combined	1:32.99	DNF		DNF	
Éva Koch	Giant Slalom	DNF			DNF	
Ágnes Litter	Slalom	1:31.67	1:03.94		2:35.61	28
Ophélie Rácz	Slalom	DNF			DNF	
Ophélie Rácz	Combined	1:34.85	DNF		DNF	

== Biathlon ==
Men

Athlete	Event	Final		
Athlete	Event	Time	Pen.	Rank
János Panyik	10 km Sprint	31:04.3	2	33
János Panyik	20 km Individual	1:01:41.6	4	31

Women

Athlete	Event	Final		
Athlete	Event	Time	Pen.	Rank
Brigitta Bereczki	7.5 km Sprint	30:42.4	4	65
Brigitta Bereczki	15 km Individual	1:02:14.2	7	65
Anna Bozsik	7.5 km Sprint	29:04.4	2	46
Beatrix Holéczy	15 km Individual	1:00:43.9	4	61
Anna Bozsik; Brigitta Bereczki; Éva Szemcsák; Beatrix Holéczy	4 × 7.5 km Relay	2:08:27.6	5	17

== Bobsleigh ==
Athlete	Event	Final					
Athlete	Event	Run 1	Run 2	Run 3	Run 4	Total	Rank
Nicholas Frankl; Miklós Gyulai	Two-man	54.14	54.27	54.16	54.49	3:37.06	28

== Figure skating ==
Women

Athlete	Final				
Athlete	Short Program	Rank	Free Skating	Total	Rank
Krisztina Czakó	6.0	12	11.0	17.0	11

Ice Dancing

Athlete	Final								
Athlete	Compulsory Dance 1	Rank	Compulsory Dance 2	Rank	Original Dance	Rank	Free Dance	Total	Rank
Enikő Berkes; Szilárd Tóth	4.0	20	4.0	20	12.0	20	20.0	40.0	20

== Speed skating ==
Men

Athlete	Event	Final	
Athlete	Event	Time	Rank
Krisztina Egyed	500 metres	42.29	30
Krisztina Egyed	1000 metres	1:24.71	34
