= Alpine skiing at the 2018 Winter Olympics – Women's slalom =

Women's slalom at the XXIII Olympic Winter Games
- Alpine skiing
- Venue: Yongpyong Alpine Centre, Pyeongchang, South Korea
- Date: 16 February 2018
- Competitors: 78 from 46 nations
- Winning time: 1:38.63

Medalists
1st place, gold medalist(s)		Frida Hansdotter	Sweden
2nd place, silver medalist(s)		Wendy Holdener	Switzerland
3rd place, bronze medalist(s)		Katharina Gallhuber	Austria

The women's slalom competition of the PyeongChang 2018 Olympics was held on 16 February 2018 at the Yongpyong Alpine Centre at the Alpensia Sports Park in PyeongChang. The competition was originally set to be held on 14 February 2018, but high winds forced officials to reschedule it for 16 February.

In the victory ceremony, the medals were presented by Stefan Holm, member of the International Olympic Committee, accompanied by Mats Årjes, FIS Council member.

== Qualification ==
A total of up to 320 alpine skiers qualified across all eleven events. Athletes qualified for this event by having met the A qualification standard, which meant having 140 or less FIS Points and being ranked in the top 500 in the Olympic FIS points list or meeting the B standard, which meant 140 or less FIS points. Countries not meeting the A standard were allowed to enter a maximum of one B standard athlete per gender. The Points list takes into average the best results of athletes per discipline during the qualification period (1 July 2016 to 21 January 2018). Countries received additional quotas by having athletes ranked in the top 30 of the 2017–18 FIS Alpine Ski World Cup (two per gender maximum, overall across all events). After the distribution of B standard quotas (to nations competing only in the slalom and giant slalom events), the remaining quotas were distributed using the Olympic FIS Points list, with each athlete only counting once for qualification purposes. A country could only enter a maximum of four athletes for the event.

== Results ==
The race started at 10:00 (run 1) and 13:15 (run 2).

Rank	Bib	Name	Nation	Run 1	Rank	Run 2	Rank	Total	Behind
1st place, gold medalist(s)	7	Frida Hansdotter	Sweden	49.09	2	49.54	2	1:38.63	—
2nd place, silver medalist(s)	1	Wendy Holdener	Switzerland	48.89	1	49.79	5	1:38.68	+0.05
3rd place, bronze medalist(s)	15	Katharina Gallhuber	Austria	50.12	9	48.83	1	1:38.95	+0.32
4	4	Mikaela Shiffrin	United States	49.37	4	49.66	3	1:39.03	+0.40
5	5	Anna Swenn-Larsson	Sweden	49.29	3	50.32	10	1:39.61	+0.98
6	2	Nina Haver-Løseth	Norway	49.75	5	50.41	11	1:40.16	+1.53
7	6	Bernadette Schild	Austria	49.89	8	50.29	9	1:40.18	+1.55
8	18	Katharina Liensberger	Austria	50.43	10	50.14	8	1:40.57	+1.94
9	9	Chiara Costazza	Italy	49.83	7	50.77	17	1:40.60	+1.97
10	14	Irene Curtoni	Italy	51.15	14	49.89	7	1:41.04	+2.41
11	17	Erin Mielzynski	Canada	51.83	22	49.66	3	1:41.49	+2.86
12	19	Emelie Wikström	Sweden	49.76	6	51.81	28	1:41.57	+2.94
13	3	Petra Vlhová	Slovakia	51.12	12	50.46	14	1:41.58	+2.95
14	10	Denise Feierabend	Switzerland	51.93	24	49.80	6	1:41.73	+3.10
15	29	Laurence St. Germain	Canada	50.94	11	50.86	20	1:41.80	+3.17
16	11	Michelle Gisin	Switzerland	51.43	18	50.42	12	1:41.85	+3.22
17	8	Veronika Velez-Zuzulová	Slovakia	51.46	21	50.61	16	1:42.07	+3.44
18	24	Maruša Ferk	Slovenia	51.29	15	50.79	18	1:42.08	+3.45
19	16	Marina Wallner	Germany	51.12	12	50.98	22	1:42.10	+3.47
20	26	Nastasia Noens	France	51.84	23	50.44	13	1:42.28	+3.65
21	37	Meta Hrovat	Slovenia	51.93	24	50.57	15	1:42.50	+3.87
22	20	Maren Skjøld	Norway	51.44	19	51.18	23	1:42.62	+3.99
23	28	Manuela Mölgg	Italy	51.40	17	51.35	25	1:42.75	+4.12
24	21	Ana Bucik	Slovenia	52.09	26	50.82	19	1:42.91	+4.28
25	41	Kristin Lysdahl	Norway	52.12	28	50.90	21	1:43.02	+4.39
26	31	Nevena Ignjatović	Serbia	52.10	27	51.38	26	1:43.48	+4.85
27	30	Roni Remme	Canada	52.43	29	51.18	23	1:43.61	+4.98
28	40	Maria Shkanova	Belarus	52.50	30	51.71	27	1:44.21	+5.58
29	34	Martina Dubovská	Czech Republic	52.90	32	51.87	29	1:44.77	+6.14
30	36	Mireia Gutiérrez	Andorra	53.22	34	52.84	31	1:46.06	+7.43
31	39	Andrea Komšić	Croatia	53.41	36	52.85	32	1:46.26	+7.63
32	32	Ekaterina Tkachenko	Olympic Athletes from Russia	53.22	34	53.33	33	1:46.55	+7.92
33	42	Charlie Guest	Great Britain	55.44	42	52.82	30	1:48.26	+9.63
34	51	Barbara Kantorová	Slovakia	54.62	40	53.81	34	1:48.43	+9.80
35	57	Maria Kirkova	Bulgaria	54.87	41	54.14	35	1:49.01	+10.38
36	43	Megan McJames	United States	54.22	38	55.06	39	1:49.28	+10.65
37	44	Lelde Gasūna	Latvia	54.50	39	54.81	37	1:49.31	+10.68
38	50	Marjolein Decroix	Belgium	55.91	45	54.80	36	1:50.71	+12.08
39	56	Nino Tsiklauri	Georgia	55.88	43	55.74	40	1:51.62	+12.99
40	47	Kim Vanreusel	Belgium	55.90	44	55.96	41	1:51.86	+13.23
41	48	Freydís Halla Einarsdóttir	Iceland	56.49	46	56.66	42	1:53.15	+14.52
42	55	Alice Merryweather	United States	58.68	49	54.89	38	1:53.57	+14.94
43	63	Ieva Januškevičiūtė	Lithuania	57.30	47	57.25	43	1:54.55	+15.92
44	62	Sophia Ralli	Greece	57.95	48	57.49	44	1:55.44	+16.81
45	68	Olha Knysh	Ukraine	59.07	50	58.93	46	1:58.00	+19.37
46	61	Tess Arbez	Ireland	59.47	51	59.00	47	1:58.47	+19.84
47	60	Mialitiana Clerc	Madagascar	1:01.24	53	59.03	48	2:00.27	+21.64
48	77	Anna Lotta Jõgeva	Estonia	1:00.90	52	59.61	49	2:00.51	+21.88
49	73	Forough Abbasi	Iran	1:02.56	55	1:01.50	50	2:04.06	+25.43
50	67	Élise Pellegrin	Malta	1:05.18	56	58.90	45	2:04.08	+25.45
51	71	Mariya Grigorova	Kazakhstan	1:02.49	54	1:01.88	51	2:04.37	+25.74
52	75	Natacha Mohbat	Lebanon	1:06.73	57	1:05.31	53	2:12.04	+33.41
53	74	Mariann Mimi Maróty	Hungary	1:09.95	58	1:02.83	52	2:12.78	+34.15
54	78	Kim Ryon-hyang	North Korea	1:18.17	59	1:19.81	54	2:37.98	+59.35
	22	Estelle Alphand	Sweden	51.34	16	DNF	—N/a		
	12	Christina Geiger	Germany	51.44	19	DNF	—N/a		
	27	Adeline Baud Mugnier	France	52.65	31	DNF	—N/a		
	38	Gabriela Capová	Czech Republic	52.96	33	DNF	—N/a		
	45	Ida Štimac	Croatia	54.14	37	DNF	—N/a		
	13	Lena Dürr	Germany	DNF	—N/a				
	23	Resi Stiegler	United States	DNF	—N/a				
	25	Stephanie Brunner	Austria	DNF	—N/a				
	33	Asa Ando	Japan	DNF	—N/a				
	35	Alex Tilley	Great Britain	DNF	—N/a				
	46	Kang Young-seo	South Korea	DNF	—N/a				
	49	Gim So-hui	South Korea	DNF	—N/a				
	52	Soňa Moravčíková	Slovakia	DNF	—N/a				
	53	Nicol Gastaldi	Argentina	DNF	—N/a				
	54	Marta Bassino	Italy	DNF	—N/a				
	58	Elvedina Muzaferija	Bosnia and Herzegovina	DNF	—N/a				
	59	Alice Robinson	New Zealand	DNF	—N/a				
	64	Kong Fanying	China	DNF	—N/a				
	65	Arabella Ng	Hong Kong	DNF	—N/a				
	66	Szonja Hozmann	Hungary	DNF	—N/a				
	69	Suela Mëhilli	Albania	DNF	—N/a				
	70	Jelena Vujičić	Montenegro	DNF	—N/a				
	72	Özlem Çarıkçıoğlu	Turkey	DNF	—N/a				
	76	Alexia Arisarah Schenkel	Thailand	DNF	—N/a				
