= Hungary at the 1932 Winter Olympics =

- IOC code: HUN
- NOC: Hungarian Olympic Committee
- Website: www.olimpia.hu (in Hungarian and English)

in Lake Placid
- Competitors: 4 (2 men and 2 women) in 1 sport
- Flag bearer: László Szollás
- Medals Ranked 10th: Gold 0 Silver 0 Bronze 1 Total 1

Winter Olympics appearances (overview)
- 1924; 1928; 1932; 1936; 1948; 1952; 1956; 1960; 1964; 1968; 1972; 1976; 1980; 1984; 1988; 1992; 1994; 1998; 2002; 2006; 2010; 2014; 2018; 2022; 2026

Hungary participated at the 1932 Winter Olympics in Lake Placid, United States, held between 4 and 13 February 1932. The country's participation in the Games marked its third appearance at the Winter Olympics since its debut in the inaugural Games.

The Hungarian team consisted of four athletes (including two women) who competed in pair skating. Skater László Szollás was the country's flag-bearer during the opening ceremony. Hungary was ranked tenth in the overall medal table with a lone bronze medal won by Emília Rotter and László Szollás in the figure skating event.

== Background ==
Hungary competed in the Olympic Games since the inaugural edition of the Summer Olympics in 1896. The Hungarian Olympic Committee was formed in 1895 by Dr. Ferenc Kemény, who was one of the founding members of the International Olympic Committee (IOC). However, the nation was not allowed to participate in the 1920 Summer Olympics as a consequence of the First World War. The nation made its debut in the Winter Olympics at the inaugural Games held in 1924 held in Chamonix, France. This edition of the Games marked the nation's third appearance at the Winter Games.

The 1932 Winter Olympics in Lake Placid, United States, held between 4 and 13 February 1932. The Hungarian delegation consisted of four athletes competing in a single sport. Skater László Szollás was the country's flag-bearer in the Parade of Nations during the opening ceremony. Hungary was ranked tenth in the overall medal table with a lone bronze medal.

== Medalists ==
Emília Rotter and László Szollás won a bronze medal in the figure skating event.

Medalists
Medal	Name	Sport	Event
Bronze	Emília Rotter; László Szollás	Figure skating	Pairs

== Competitors ==
There were four athletes including two women who took part in a single sport.

Sport	Men	Women	Athletes
Figure skating	2	2	4
Total	2	2	4

== Figure skating ==
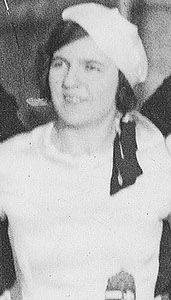
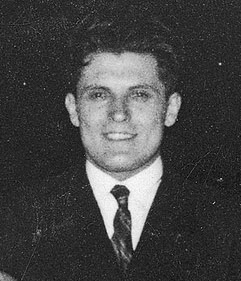
Emília Rotter (left) and László Szollás won a bronze medal in figure skating

Figure skating competitions were held on 8 and 9 February at the Olympic Arena. As per the terms of the competition, the skaters were ordinally ranked by every judge from first through last place, which were based on the points awarded. The final placement was determined by a Majority Placement rule with the ranks tallied together. The Hungarian pair of Emília Rotter and László Szollás won the bronze medal after finishing third with a combined score of 76.4. The other Hungarian pair of Olga Orgonista and Sándor Szalay narrowly missed out on a medal after finishing fourth with 72.2 points.

Athlete	Event	Ordinals	Points	Majority Placement	Rank
Emília Rotter; László Szollás	Pairs	20	76.4	6x3+	3rd place, bronze medalist(s)
Olga Orgonista; Sándor Szalay	Pairs	28	72.2	7x5+	4
