= Hungary at the 1956 Winter Olympics =

- IOC code: HUN (UNG used at these Games)
- NOC: Hungarian Olympic Committee
- Website: www.olimpia.hu (in Hungarian and English)

in Cortina d'Ampezzo, Italy 26 January–5 February 1956
- Competitors: 2 (1 man and 1 woman) in 1 sport
- Flag bearer: István Erdélyi
- Medals Ranked 12th: Gold 0 Silver 0 Bronze 1 Total 1

Winter Olympics appearances (overview)
- 1924; 1928; 1932; 1936; 1948; 1952; 1956; 1960; 1964; 1968; 1972; 1976; 1980; 1984; 1988; 1992; 1994; 1998; 2002; 2006; 2010; 2014; 2018; 2022; 2026

Hungary competed at the 1956 Winter Olympics in Cortina d'Ampezzo, Italy.

== Medalists ==
Medal	Name	Sport	Event	Date
Bronze	Marianna Nagy; László Nagy	Figure skating	Pairs	February 4

== Figure skating ==
Pairs

Athletes	Points	Places	Rank
Marianna Nagy; László Nagy	11.03	32	3rd place, bronze medalist(s)

== Sources ==
- Official Olympic Reports
- International Olympic Committee results database
- Olympic Winter Games 1956, full results by sports-reference.com
