= Hungary at the 2014 Winter Olympics =

- IOC code: HUN
- NOC: Hungarian Olympic Committee
- Website: www.olimpia.hu (in Hungarian and English)

in Sochi
- Competitors: 16 in 5 sports
- Flag bearers: Bernadett Heidum (opening); Szandra Lajtos (closing)
- Medals: Gold 0 Silver 0 Bronze 0 Total 0

Winter Olympics appearances (overview)
- 1924; 1928; 1932; 1936; 1948; 1952; 1956; 1960; 1964; 1968; 1972; 1976; 1980; 1984; 1988; 1992; 1994; 1998; 2002; 2006; 2010; 2014; 2018; 2022; 2026

Hungary competed at the 2014 Winter Olympics in Sochi, Russia, from 7 to 23 February 2014. A team of 16 athletes competing in five sports were selected to the team.

Before the Games began, the Hungarian Olympic Committee received a threatening letter which warned of an attack on its athletes at the Games. It was dismissed as not being credible.

== Alpine skiing ==
According to the quota allocation released on 20 January 2014, Hungary had three athletes in qualification position. Edit Miklós's 7th-place finish in the women's downhill set a new record as the highest placing alpine skiing at the Winter Olympics for the country. As for Anna Berecz, she was remarked for being one of the few, along Tina Maze and Macarena Simari Birkner, to complete all the five races in which she competed.

Athlete	Event	Run 1		Run 2		Total	
Athlete	Event	Time	Rank	Time	Rank	Time	Rank
Norbert Farkas	Men's giant slalom	1:29.77	55	1:31.56	50	3:01.33	50
Norbert Farkas	Men's slalom	55.68	58	DNF			
Anna Berecz	Women's combined	1:50.28	33	58.41	21	2:48.69	21
Anna Berecz	Women's downhill	—				1:50.97	35
Anna Berecz	Women's giant slalom	1:26.96	53	1:27.09	48	2:54.05	48
Anna Berecz	Women's slalom	1:03.28	44	1:01.64	38	2:04.92	35
Anna Berecz	Women's super-G	—				1:33.07	28
Edit Miklós	Women's combined	1:44.32	13	57.29	19	2:41.61	16
Edit Miklós	Women's downhill	—				1:42.28	7
Edit Miklós	Women's giant slalom	1:23.89	36	1:21.92	32	2:45.81	33
Edit Miklós	Women's super-G	—				1:27.87	15

== Biathlon ==
Hungary received two reallocation quota spots in biathlon.

Athlete	Event	Time	Misses	Rank
Károly Gombos	Men's sprint	28:04.3	1 (0+1)	79
Károly Gombos	Men's individual	1:05:16.7	8 (0+4+1+3)	88
Emőke Szőcs	Women's sprint	24:15.4	2 (0+2)	70
Emőke Szőcs	Women's individual	18:28:00	6 (1+1+1+3)	70

== Cross-country skiing ==
According to the final quota allocation released on 20 January 2014, Hungary qualified two athletes.

Distance

Athlete	Event	Final		
Athlete	Event	Time	Deficit	Rank
Milan Szabó	Men's 15 km classical	47:01.3	+8:31.6	78
Ágnes Simon	Women's 10 km classical	38:36.7	+10:18.9	66

Sprint

Athlete	Event	Qualification		Quarterfinal		Semifinal		Final	
Athlete	Event	Time	Rank	Time	Rank	Time	Rank	Time	Rank
Milan Szabó	Men's sprint	3:59.68	73	Did not advance					
Ágnes Simon	Women's sprint	3:04.72	66	Did not advance					

== Short track speed skating ==
Hungary qualified 5 women and 3 men for the Olympics during World Cup 3 and 4 in November 2013.

Men

Athlete	Event	Heat		Quarterfinal		Semifinal		Final	
Athlete	Event	Time	Rank	Time	Rank	Time	Rank	Time	Rank
Bence Béres	1000 m	1:27.735	4	Did not advance					26
Bence Béres	1500 m	2:20.327	6	—		Did not advance			33
Viktor Knoch	500 m	42.261	2 Q	42.043	3	Did not advance			12
Viktor Knoch	1000 m	1:25.426	2 Q	1:25.673	5	Did not advance			18
Viktor Knoch	1500 m	2:47.714	6	—		Did not advance			34
Sándor Liu Shaolin	500 m	41.683	3	Did not advance					18
Sándor Liu Shaolin	1000 m	1:35.935	3 ADV	1:24.966	4	Did not advance			16
Sándor Liu Shaolin	1500 m	2:14.055	4	—		Did not advance			20

Women

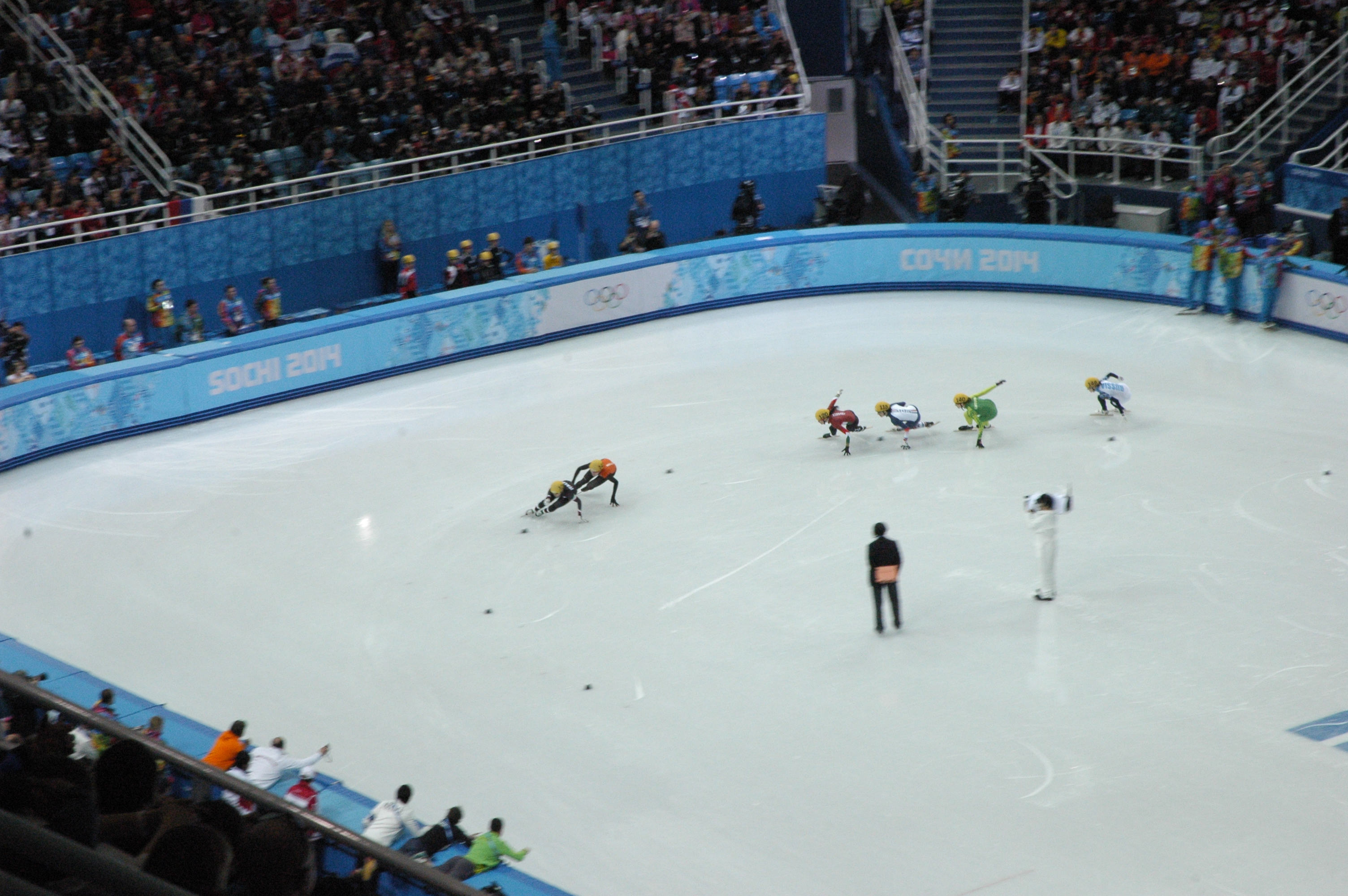
Bernadett Heidum in the women's 1500m semifinal

Athlete	Event	Heat		Quarterfinal		Semifinal		Final	
Athlete	Event	Time	Rank	Time	Rank	Time	Rank	Time	Rank
Bernadett Heidum	1000 m	PEN		Did not advance					
Bernadett Heidum	1500 m	2:21.826	2 Q	—		2:20.196	3 FB	2:26.004	9
Andrea Keszler	500 m	45.215	4	Did not advance					28
Zsófia Kónya	1500 m	2:55.523	5	—		Did not advance			30
Rózsa Darázs; Bernadett Heidum; Andrea Keszler; Zsófia Kónya; Szandra Lajtos	3000 m relay	—				4:15.473	4 FB	4:24.496	6

Qualification legend: ADV – Advanced due to being impeded by another skater; FA – Qualify to medal round; FB – Qualify to consolation round

== Speed skating ==
Based on the results from the fall World Cups during the 2013–14 ISU Speed Skating World Cup season, Hungary earned the following start quota:

Men

Athlete	Event	Final	
Athlete	Event	Time	Rank
Konrád Nagy	1500 m	1:48.12	26
