= Hungary at the 1980 Winter Olympics =

- IOC code: HUN
- NOC: Hungarian Olympic Committee
- Website: www.olimpia.hu (in Hungarian and English)

in Lake Placid
- Competitors: 2 (1 man and 1 woman) in 1 sport
- Flag bearer: András Sallay
- Medals Ranked 15th: Gold 0 Silver 1 Bronze 0 Total 1

Winter Olympics appearances (overview)
- 1924; 1928; 1932; 1936; 1948; 1952; 1956; 1960; 1964; 1968; 1972; 1976; 1980; 1984; 1988; 1992; 1994; 1998; 2002; 2006; 2010; 2014; 2018; 2022; 2026; 2030

Hungary competed at the 1980 Winter Olympics in Lake Placid, United States.

== Medalists ==
Medal	Name	Sport	Event
Silver	Krisztina Regőczy; András Sallay	Figure skating	Ice dancing

== Figure skating ==
Ice Dancing

Athletes	CD	FD	Points	Places	Rank
Krisztina Regőczy; András Sallay	2	1	204.52	14	2nd place, silver medalist(s)
