= Hungary at the 2022 Winter Olympics =

- Flag of Hungary
- IOC code: HUN
- NOC: Hungarian Olympic Committee
- Website: www.olimpia.hu (in Hungarian)

in Beijing, China 4–20 February 2022
- Competitors: 14 (8 men and 6 women) in 5 sports
- Flag bearers (opening): Márton Kékesi; Zita Tóth
- Flag bearer (closing): Ádám Kónya
- Medals Ranked 20th: Gold 1 Silver 0 Bronze 2 Total 3

Winter Olympics appearances (overview)
- 1924; 1928; 1932; 1936; 1948; 1952; 1956; 1960; 1964; 1968; 1972; 1976; 1980; 1984; 1988; 1992; 1994; 1998; 2002; 2006; 2010; 2014; 2018; 2022; 2026

Hungary competed at the 2022 Winter Olympics in Beijing, China, from 4 to 20 February 2022.

Hungary's team consisted of 14 athletes (8 men and six women) competing in five sports. Márton Kékesi and Zita Tóth were the country's flagbearers during the opening ceremony. Meanwhile cross-country skier Adam Konya was the flagbearer during the closing ceremony.

== Medalists ==
The following Hungarian competitors won medals at the games. In the discipline sections below, the medalists' names are bolded.

Medal	Name	Sport	Event	Date
Gold	Shaoang Liu	Short track speed skating	Men's 500 metres	13 February
Bronze	Petra Jászapáti; Zsófia Kónya; Shaoang Liu; Shaolin Sándor Liu; John-Henry Krueger	Short track speed skating	Mixed 2000 metre relay	5 February
Bronze	Shaoang Liu	Short track speed skating	Men's 1000 metres	7 February

Medals by gender
**Gender**	1st place, gold medalist(s)	2nd place, silver medalist(s)	3rd place, bronze medalist(s)	**Total**
Male	1	0	1	**2**
Mixed	0	0	1	**1**
Total	1	0	2	3

=== Multiple medalists ===
The following competitors won multiple medals at the 2022 Olympic Games.

Name	Medal	Sport	Event
Shaoang Liu	Gold; Bronze; Bronze	Short track speed skating	Men's 500 m Mixed 2000 m relay Men's 1000 m

== Competitors ==
The following is a list of the number of competitors participating at the Games per sport/discipline.

Sport	Men	Women	Total
Alpine skiing	1	1	2
Cross-country skiing	1	1	2
Figure skating	1	1	2
Short track speed skating	5	2	7
Snowboarding	0	1	1
Total	8	6	14

== Alpine skiing ==
By meeting the basic qualification standards Hungary qualified one male and one female alpine skier.

Athlete	Event	Run 1		Run 2		Total	
Athlete	Event	Time	Rank	Time	Rank	Time	Rank
Márton Kékesi	Men's giant slalom	1:14.47	39	1:19.07	34	2:33.54	34
Márton Kékesi	Men's slalom	1:01.85	40	56.12	32	1:57.97	33
Zita Tóth	Women's giant slalom	DNF		did not advance			
Zita Tóth	Women's slalom	57.97	44	57.89	40	1:55.86	40

== Cross-country skiing ==
By meeting the basic qualification standards Hungary qualified one male and one female cross-country skier.

Distance

Athlete	Event	Time	Deficit	Rank
Ádám Kónya	Men's 15 km classical	45:48.9	+7:54.1	80
Ádám Kónya	Men's 50 km freestyle	1:25:21.4	+13:48.7	55
Sára Pónya	Women's 10 km classical	41:13.6	+13:07.3	97

Sprint

Athlete	Event	Qualification		Quarterfinal		Semifinal		Final	
Athlete	Event	Time	Rank	Time	Rank	Time	Rank	Time	Rank
Ádám Kónya	Men's	3:09.43	72	did not advance					

== Figure skating ==
In the 2021 World Figure Skating Championships in Stockholm, Sweden, Hungary secured one quota in pairs competitions.

On 18 February 2022, Ioulia Chtchetinina and Márk Magyar withdrew prior to the short program due to Magyar's positive COVID-19 test.

Mixed

Athlete	Event	SP / RD		FS / FD		Total	
Athlete	Event	Points	Rank	Points	Rank	Points	Rank
Ioulia Chtchetinina; Márk Magyar	Pairs	Withdrew		did not advance			

== Short track speed skating ==
Hungary has qualified in the men's and mixed relays, qualifying five male and two female athletes.

Men

Athlete	Event	Heat		Quarterfinal		Semifinal		Final	
Athlete	Event	Time	Rank	Time	Rank	Time	Rank	Time	Rank
John-Henry Krueger	500 m	40.407	2 **Q**	40.844	5	did not advance			17
John-Henry Krueger	1000 m	1:25.236	1 **Q**	DSQ		did not advance			14
John-Henry Krueger	1500 m	—N/a		2:12.525	3 **Q**	2:18.671	5 **ADVB**	2:18.059	11
**Shaoang Liu**	500 m	40.797	1 **Q**	40.386	1 **Q**	40.157	1 **QA**	40.338	1st place, gold medalist(s)
**Shaoang Liu**	1000 m	1:23.796	1 **Q**	1:23.940	2 **Q**	1:35.384	5 **ADVA**	1:35.693	3rd place, bronze medalist(s)
**Shaoang Liu**	1500 m	—N/a		2:15.376	2 **Q**	2:15.519	1 **FA**	2:09.409	4
Shaolin Sándor Liu	500 m	40.948	1 **Q**	40.700	4	did not advance			13
Shaolin Sándor Liu	1000 m	1:25.262	1 **Q**	1:55.248	3 **ADV**	1:23.567	1 **FA**	YC	
Shaolin Sándor Liu	1500 m	—N/a		2:09.213 **OR**	1 **Q**	2:10.685	2 **FA**	2:09.953	6
Shaoang Liu; Shaolin Sándor Liu; John-Henry Krueger; Bence Nógrádi	5000 m relay	—N/a				6:45.192	6 **QB**	6:39.713	6

Qualification legend: FA - Qualify to medal final; FB - Qualify to consolation final; ADV - Advanced on referee decision

Women

Athlete	Event	Heat		Quarterfinal		Semifinal		Final	
Athlete	Event	Time	Rank	Time	Rank	Time	Rank	Time	Rank
Petra Jászapáti	500 m	42.848	2 **Q**	43.476	1 **Q**	43.198	3 **FB**	43.004	7
Petra Jászapáti	1000 m	1:28.392	2 **Q**	1:28.786	3 **q**	1:28.827	5 **FB**	1:30.249	8
Petra Jászapáti	1500 m	—N/a		2:22.115	2 **Q**	DSQ		Did not advance	22
Zsófia Kónya	500 m	43.905	3	did not advance					21
Zsófia Kónya	1000 m	No time		did not advance					29
Zsófia Kónya	1500 m	—N/a		PEN		did not advance			

Qualification legend: FA - Qualify to medal final; FB - Qualify to consolation final

Mixed

Athlete	Event	Quarterfinal		Semifinal		Final	
Athlete	Event	Time	Rank	Time	Rank	Time	Rank
**Petra Jászapáti**; **Zsófia Kónya**; **Shaoang Liu**; **Shaolin Sándor Liu**; **John-Henry Krueger**	2000 m relay	2:38.396	1 **Q**	2:38.052	1 **FA**	2:40.900	3rd place, bronze medalist(s)

Qualification legend: FA - Qualify to medal final; FB - Qualify to consolation final

== Snowboarding ==
Hungary secured one quota in women's halfpipe.

Freestyle

Athlete	Event	Qualification					Final				
Athlete	Event	Run 1	Run 2	Run 3	Best	Rank	Run 1	Run 2	Run 3	Best	Rank
Kamilla Kozuback	Women's big air	51.50	~~5.50~~	59.00	110.50	17	did not advance				
Kamilla Kozuback	Women's halfpipe	35.50	15.00	—N/a	35.50	19	did not advance				
Kamilla Kozuback	Women's slopestyle	21.95	19.58	—N/a	21.95	28	did not advance				
