= Hungary at the 2010 Winter Olympics =

- IOC code: HUN
- NOC: Hungarian Olympic Committee
- Website: www.olimpia.hu (in Hungarian and English)

in Vancouver
- Competitors: 16 in 5 sports
- Flag bearers: Júlia Sebestyén (opening); Erika Huszár (closing)
- Medals: Gold 0 Silver 0 Bronze 0 Total 0

Winter Olympics appearances (overview)
- 1924; 1928; 1932; 1936; 1948; 1952; 1956; 1960; 1964; 1968; 1972; 1976; 1980; 1984; 1988; 1992; 1994; 1998; 2002; 2006; 2010; 2014; 2018; 2022; 2026

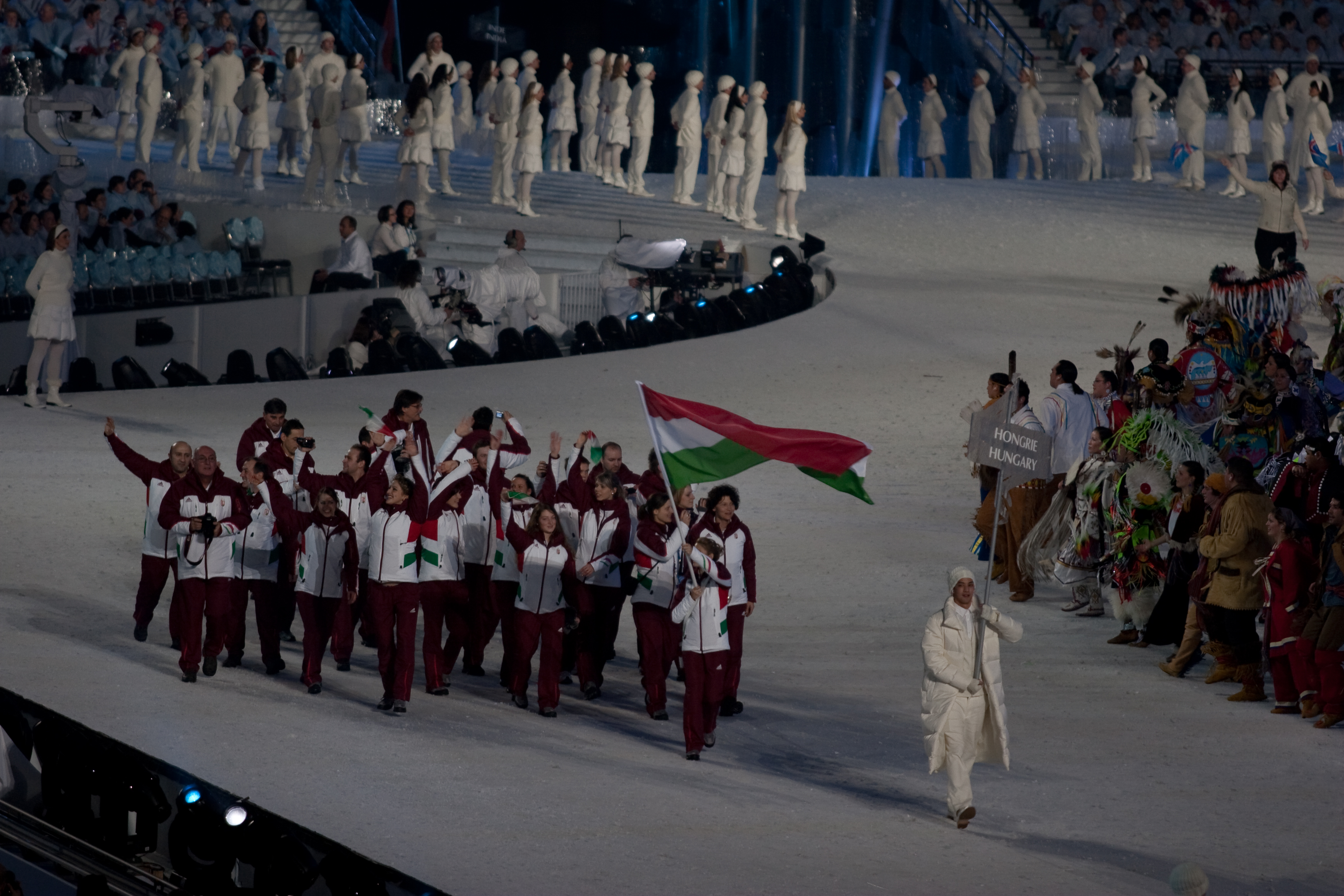
The athletes entering the stadium during the opening ceremonies.

Hungary participated at the 2010 Winter Olympics in Vancouver, British Columbia, Canada.

== Alpine skiing ==
Athlete	Event	Run 1	Run 2	Total	Rank
Márton Bene	Men's slalom	DNF			
Márton Bene	Men's giant slalom	1:31.08	1:34.89	3:05.97	71
Anna Berecz	Women's slalom	59.81	59.82	1:59.63	45
Anna Berecz	Women's super-G			DNF	
Anna Berecz	Women's downhill			1:57.86	35
Anna Berecz	Women's combined	1:33.47	49.50	2:22.97	27
Anna Berecz	Women's giant slalom	1:22.29	1:18.58	2:40.87	42
Zsófia Döme	Women's slalom	58.74	59.58	1:58.32	44
Zsófia Döme	Women's super-G			1:29.09	36
Zsófia Döme	Women's giant slalom	DNF			

== Biathlon ==
Athlete	Event	Final		
Athlete	Event	Time	Misses	Rank
Imre Tagscherer	Men's sprint	28:38.8	2+2	80
Imre Tagscherer	Men's individual	58:02.6	1+3+0+0	82

== Cross-country skiing ==
Athlete	Event	Final	
Athlete	Event	Total	Rank
Zoltán Tagscherer	Men's 15 km freestyle	41:15.0	81
Vera Viczián	Women's 10 km freestyle	33:45.8	75

== Figure skating ==
Hungary qualified 1 entrant in ladies singles and 1 in ice dancing, for a total of 3 athletes.

Athlete(s)	Event	CD		SP/OD		FS/FD		Total	
Athlete(s)	Event	Points	Rank	Points	Rank	Points	Rank	Points	Rank
Júlia Sebestyén	Ladies'			57.46	13	93.80	16	151.26	17
Nóra Hoffmann / Maxim Zavozin	Ice dancing	31.90	13	51.22	13	84.11	13	167.23	13

== Short track speed skating ==
Hungary qualified 7 short track speed skaters.

Men

Athlete	Event	Heat		Quarterfinal		Semifinal		Final	
Athlete	Event	Time	Rank	Time	Rank	Time	Rank	Time	Rank
Péter Darázs	Men's 500 metres	42.800	3	did not advance					
Péter Darázs	Men's 1500 metres	2:18.827	3 Q	2:18.349	7	did not advance			
Viktor Knoch	Men's 500 metres	42.197	4	did not advance					
Viktor Knoch	Men's 1000 metres	1:26.279	3	did not advance					
Viktor Knoch	Men's 1500 metres	2:16.826	5	did not advance					

Women

Athlete	Event	Heat		Quarterfinal		Semifinal		Final	
Athlete	Event	Time	Rank	Time	Rank	Time	Rank	Time	Rank
Erika Huszár	Women's 500 metres	44.537	3	did not advance					
Erika Huszár	Women's 1000 metres	DSQ	DSQ	did not advance					
Erika Huszár	Women's 1500 metres	2:27.487	3 Q			2:24.192	1 Q	2:19.251	6
Bernadett Heidum	Women's 1000 metres	1:31.125	2 Q	1:30.313	3	did not advance			
Bernadett Heidum	Women's 1500 metres	2:30.332	4	did not advance					
Rózsa Darázs	Women's 1500 metres	DSQ	DSQ	did not advance					
Rózsa Darázs; Bernadett Heidum; Erika Huszár; Andrea Keszler; Szandra Lajtos*	Women's 3000 metre relay					4:17.487	4 QB	4:17.937	5

- Lajtos was the reserve and did not compete.

== See also ==
- Hungary at the Olympics
- Hungary at the 2010 Winter Paralympics
