= Hungary at the 2026 Winter Olympics =

- Flag of Hungary
- IOC code: HUN
- NOC: Hungarian Olympic Committee
- Website: www.olimpia.hu (in Hungarian)

in Milan and Cortina d'Ampezzo, Italy 6 February 2026 – 22 February 2026
- Competitors: 16 (9 men and 7 women) in 6 sports
- Flag bearers (opening): Bence Nógrádi & Maja Somodi
- Flag bearers (closing): Bence Nógrádi & Maja Somodi
- Medals: Gold 0 Silver 0 Bronze 0 Total 0

Winter Olympics appearances (overview)
- 1924; 1928; 1932; 1936; 1948; 1952; 1956; 1960; 1964; 1968; 1972; 1976; 1980; 1984; 1988; 1992; 1994; 1998; 2002; 2006; 2010; 2014; 2018; 2022; 2026

Hungary competed at the 2026 Winter Olympics in Milan and Cortina d'Ampezzo, Italy, from 6 to 22 February 2026.

Bence Nógrádi and Maja Somodi were the country's flagbearer during the opening ceremony. Meanwhile, the pair were also the country's flagbearer during the closing ceremony.

For the first time since 2014, Hungary failed to secure a single Winter Olympic medal.

== Competitors ==
The following is the list of number of competitors participating at the Games per sport/discipline.

Sport	Men	Women	Total
Alpine skiing	1	1	2
Cross-country skiing	2	2	4
Figure skating	1	1	2
Short-track speed skating	4	2	6
Snowboarding	0	1	1
Speed skating	1	0	1
Total	9	7	16

== Alpine skiing ==
Hungary qualified one female and one male alpine skier through the basic quota.

Athlete	Event	Run 1		Run 2		Total	
Athlete	Event	Time	Rank	Time	Rank	Time	Rank
Bálint Úry	Men's giant slalom	1:19.60	33	1:14.70	33	2:34.30	32
Bálint Úry	Men's slalom	DNF					
Zita Tóth	Women's giant slalom	1:08.69	42	1:16.72	41	2:25.41	40
Zita Tóth	Women's slalom	50.73	36	55.71	33	1:46.44	31

== Cross-country skiing ==
Hungary qualified one female and one male cross-country skier through the basic quota. Following the completion of the 2024–25 FIS Cross-Country World Cup, Hungary qualified a further one female and one male athlete.

Distance

Athlete	Event	Classical		Freestyle		Final		
Athlete	Event	Time	Rank	Time	Rank	Time	Deficit	Rank
Ádám Büki	Men's 10 km freestyle	—N/a		25:36.2	86	—N/a		
Ádám Büki	Men's 20 km skiathlon	27:25.5	64	LAP				68
Ádám Büki	Men's 50 km classical	-	-	-	-	LAP		54
Ádám Kónya	Men's 10 km freestyle	—N/a		24:22.9	72	—N/a		
Ádám Kónya	Men's 20 km skiathlon	27:25.5	64	26:14.6	61	54:12.8	8:01.8	63
Ádám Kónya	Men's 50 km classical	-	-	-	-	LAP		44
Lara Vanda Laczkó	Women's 10 km freestyle	—N/a		29:51.7	93	—N/a		
Sára Pónya	Women's 10 km freestyle	—N/a		28:44.1	85	—N/a		

Sprint

Athlete	Event	Qualification		Quarterfinal		Semifinal		Final	
Athlete	Event	Time	Rank	Time	Rank	Time	Rank	Time	Rank
Ádám Büki	Men's sprint	4:02.02	90	Did not advance					
Sára Pónya	Women's sprint	4:24.13	77	Did not advance					
Ádám Büki; Ádám Kónya	Men's team sprint	6:34.91	26	—N/a				Did not advance	
Lara Vanda Laczkó; Sára Pónya	Women's team sprint	7:52.85	25	—N/a				Did not advance	

== Figure skating ==
In the 2025 World Figure Skating Championships in Boston, the United States, Hungary secured one quota in each of the pair skating.

Athlete	Event	SP/SD		FP/FD		Total	
Athlete	Event	Points	Rank	Points	Rank	Points	Rank
Maria Pavlova; Alexei Sviatchenko	Pairs	73.87	4	141.39	3	215.26	4

== Short-track speed skating ==
Hungary qualified six short-track speed skaters (four men and two women) after the conclusion of the 2025–26 ISU Short Track World Tour.

Men

Athlete	Event	Heat		Quarterfinal		Semifinal		Final	
Athlete	Event	Time	Rank	Time	Rank	Time	Rank	Time	Rank
Moon Won-jun	500 m	40.718	2 Q	PEN		Did not advance			
Bence Nógrádi	1000 m	1:27.132	4	Did not advance					
Moon Won-jun	1000 m	1:25.048	3 q	1:23.988	3	Did not advance			
Bence Nógrádi	1500 m	—N/a		2:22.207	5	Did not advance			
Moon Won-jun	1500 m	—N/a		2:23.997	5	Did not advance			
Dominik Major; Moon Won-jun; Bence Nógrádi; Dániel Tiborcz	5000 m relay	—N/a				7:11.221	4 FB	6:52.209	8

Qualification legend: Q - Qualify based on position in heat; q - Qualify based on time in field; FA - Qualify to medal final; ADV A - Advanced to medal final on referee decision; FB - Qualify to consolation final
* - Athlete skated in a preliminary round but not the final.

Women

Athlete	Event	Heat		Quarterfinal		Semifinal		Final	
Athlete	Event	Time	Rank	Time	Rank	Time	Rank	Time	Rank
Diána Laura Végi	500 m	44.164	4	Did not advance					
Maja Somodi	1000 m	1:28.661	4	Did not advance					
Diána Laura Végi	1000 m	1:28.779	3 q	1:29.976	4	Did not advance			
Maja Somodi	1500 m	—N/a		2:29.673	3 Q	2:21.225	4 FB	2:37.291	12
Diána Laura Végi	1500 m	—N/a		2:30.078	4 q	2:24.688	6	Did not advance	

Qualification legend: Q - Qualify based on position in heat; q - Qualify based on time in field; FA - Qualify to medal final; FB - Qualify to consolation final; ADV - Advanced on referee decision

Mixed

Athlete	Event	Quarterfinal		Semifinal		Final	
Athlete	Event	Time	Rank	Time	Rank	Time	Rank
Moon Won-jun; Bence Nogradi; Maja Somodi; Diána Laura Végi	2000 m relay	2.41.327	4	Did not advance			

Qualification legend: Q - Qualify based on position in heat; q - Qualify based on time in field; FA - Qualify to medal final; FB - Qualify to consolation final
* - Athlete skated in a preliminary round but not the final.

== Snowboarding ==
Hungary qualified 1 female snowboarder.

Cross

Athlete	Event	Seeding		1/8 final	Quarterfinal	Semifinal	Final	
Athlete	Event	Time	Rank	Position	Position	Position	Position	Rank
Blanca Brunner	Women's	1:19.47	32	4	Did not advance			

== Speed skating ==
Hungary qualified one male speed skater through performances at the 2025-26 ISU Speed Skating World Cup.

Men

Athlete	Event	Race	
Athlete	Event	Time	Rank
Kim Min-seok	Men's 1000 m	1:08.59	11
Kim Min-seok	Men's 1500 m	1:45.13	7

Mass start

Athlete	Event	Semifinal			Final		
Athlete	Event	Points	Time	Rank	Points	Time	Rank
Kim Min-seok	Men's	0	7:53.86	12	Did not advance		
