= Kim Ryon-hyang =

North Korean alpine skier (born 1992)

Personal information
- Born: 4 May 1992 (age 32)

Sport
- Country: North Korea
- Sport: Alpine skiing

Kim Ryon-hyang (born 4 May 1992) is a North Korean alpine skier. She competed in slalom and giant slalom at the 2018 Winter Olympics.
