= Hungary at the 1976 Winter Olympics =

- IOC code: HUN
- NOC: Hungarian Olympic Committee
- Website: www.olimpia.hu (in Hungarian and English)

in Innsbruck
- Competitors: 3 (2 men and 1 woman) in 1 sport
- Flag bearer: Vajda László (figure skating)
- Medals: Gold 0 Silver 0 Bronze 0 Total 0

Winter Olympics appearances (overview)
- 1924; 1928; 1932; 1936; 1948; 1952; 1956; 1960; 1964; 1968; 1972; 1976; 1980; 1984; 1988; 1992; 1994; 1998; 2002; 2006; 2010; 2014; 2018; 2022; 2026

Hungary competed at the 1976 Winter Olympics in Innsbruck, Austria.

== Figure skating ==
Men

Athlete	CF	SP	FS	Points	Places	Rank
Vajda László	10	–	–	–	DNF	–

Ice Dancing

Athletes	CD	FD	Points	Places	Rank
Krisztina Regőczy; András Sallay	5	5	195.92	48.5	5
