= György Ivánkai =

Hungarian speed skater

Personal information
- Nationality: Hungarian
- Born: 10 June 1937 (age 87); Budapest, Hungary

Sport
- Sport: Speed skating

György Ivánkai (born 10 June 1937) is a Hungarian speed skater. He competed at the 1964 Winter Olympics and the 1968 Winter Olympics.
