= Szonja Hozmann =

Hungarian alpine skier (born 2001)

Personal information
- Born: 27 April 2001 (age 23)

Sport
- Country: Hungary
- Sport: Alpine skiing

Szonja Hozmann (born 27 April 2001) is a Hungarian alpine skier. She competed in slalom and giant slalom at the 2018 Winter Olympics.
