= Pál Sajgó =

Hungarian cross-country skier and biathlete (1922–2016)

Pál Sajgó (28 June 1922 – 18 April 2016) was a Hungarian cross-country skier and biathlete who competed in the 1950s. He was born in Gheorgheni. At the 1952 Winter Olympics in Oslo, he finished 53rd in the 18 km event and 27th in the 50 km event. Eight years later he finished 34th in the 15 km event. In the 20 km biathlon competition he finished 26th.
