= György Martos =

Hungarian speed skater (born 1943)

Personal information
- Nationality: Hungarian
- Born: 15 October 1943 (age 81); Budapest, Hungary

Sport
- Sport: Speed skating

György Martos (born 15 October 1943) is a Hungarian speed skater. He competed in two events at the 1968 Winter Olympics.
