= Mariann Mimi Maróty =

Hungarian alpine skier (born 1998)

Personal information
- Born: 10 October 1998 (age 26)

Sport
- Country: Hungary
- Sport: Alpine skiing

Mariann Mimi Maróty (born 10 October 1998) is a Hungarian alpine skier. She competed in slalom and giant slalom at the 2018 Winter Olympics.
