= 1980 Winter Olympics medal table =

1980 Winter Olympics medals
- Location: Lake Placid, United States

Highlights
- Most gold medals: Soviet Union (10)
- Most total medals: East Germany (23)
- Medalling NOCs: 19

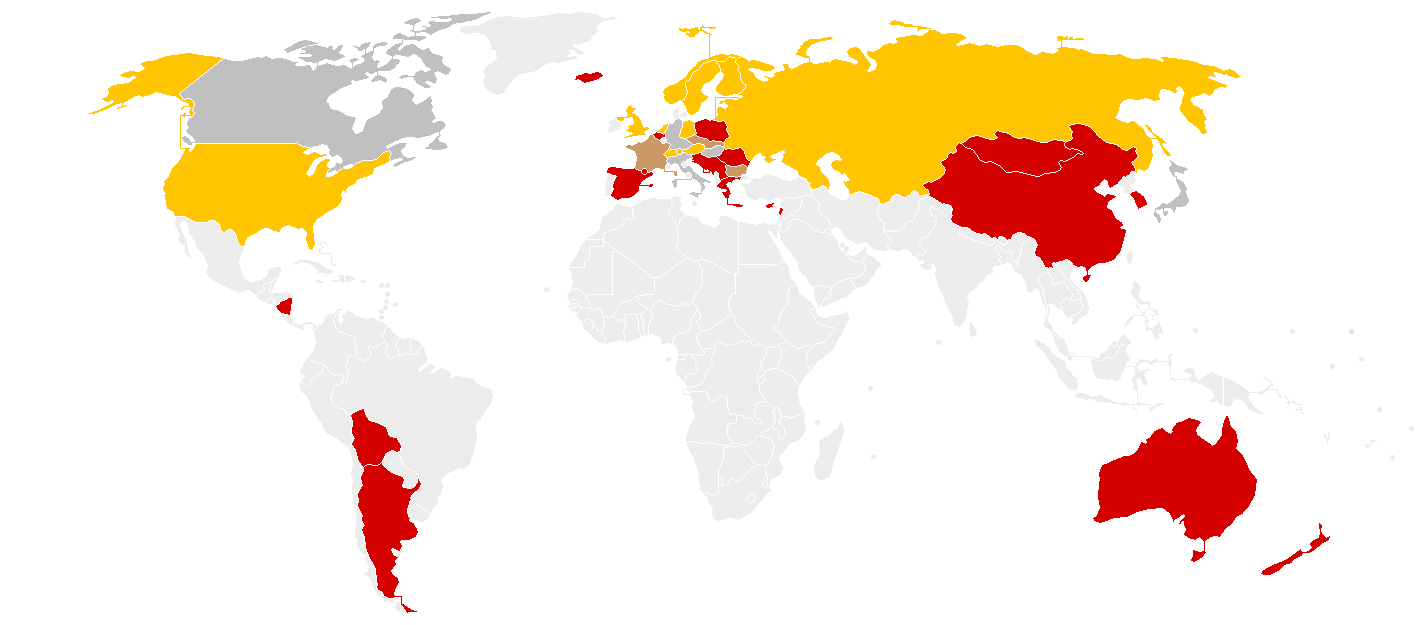
1980 Winter Olympic Games Medals map Legend: Gold represents countries that won at least one gold medal Silver represents countries that won at least one silver medal Bronze represents countries that won at least one bronze medal Red represents countries that did not win any medals Grey represents countries that did not participate

The 1980 Winter Olympics, officially known as the XIII Olympic Winter Games, were a winter multi-sport event held in Lake Placid, New York, United States, from February 13 to 24. A total of 1,072 athletes from 37 nations participated in 38 events from 10 different sports.

Athletes from 19 countries won at least one medal, and athletes from 11 secured at least one gold medal. After winning a then-record 13 gold medals in the 1976 Winter Olympics, the Soviet Union led with 10 gold medals in 1980, and had the second most total medals with 22. East Germany led the overall medal count with 23. The host United States were third in both gold and overall medals, with 6 and 12, respectively. Having won her country's first Olympic medal in Innsbruck, four years before, alpine skier Hanni Wenzel won Liechtenstein's only two gold medals in the country's history, at Lake Placid. Liechtenstein is the smallest nation to ever win a gold medal at the Olympics. Bulgaria won its first Winter Olympic medal at these Games, a bronze medal in cross-country skiing. The People's Republic of China made their first appearance at a Winter Olympics at these Games, but failed to win any medals.

American Eric Heiden led all athletes with five medals, all gold, in speed skating. Heiden was the first athlete to win five gold medals in individual events in a single Olympics, Summer or Winter. Five other athletes won three medals each at these Games.

== Medal table ==
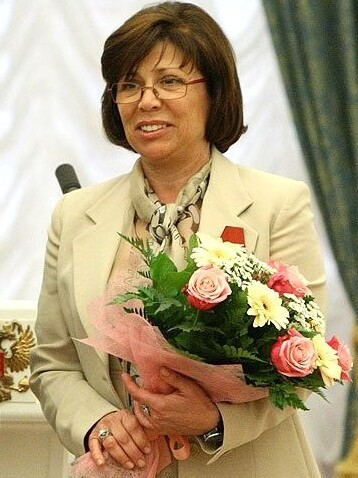
Soviet pairs figure skater Irina Rodnina won her third consecutive gold medal in Lake Placid.

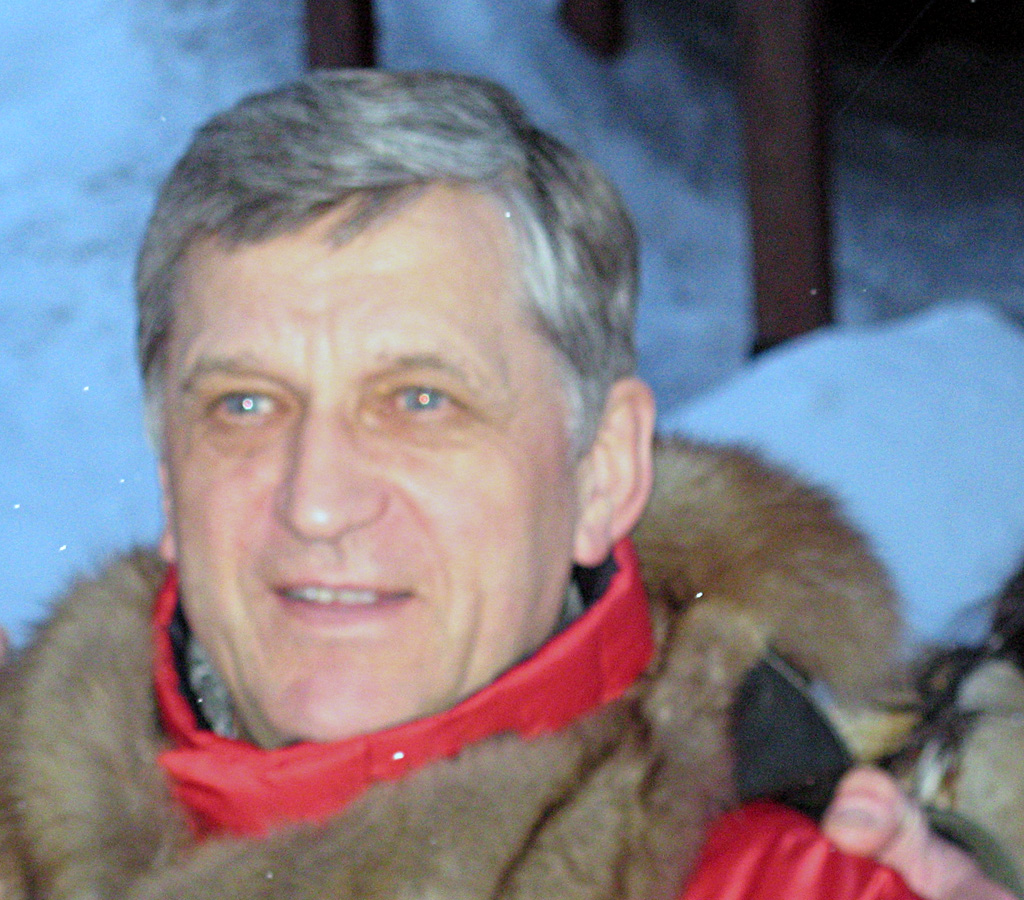
Soviet biathlete Alexander Tikhonov won his fifth and final Olympic medal in 1980.

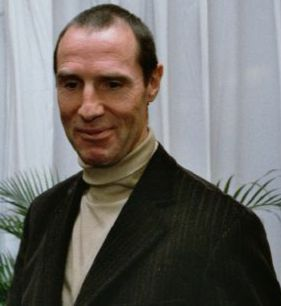
East German biathlete Frank Ullrich won three medals in Lake Placid.

The medal table is based on information provided by the International Olympic Committee (IOC) and is consistent with IOC convention in its published medal tables. The table uses the Olympic medal table sorting method. By default, the table is ordered by the number of gold medals the athletes from a nation have won, where a nation is an entity represented by a National Olympic Committee (NOC). The number of silver medals is taken into consideration next, and then the number of bronze medals. If teams are still tied, equal ranking is given and they are listed alphabetically by their IOC country code.

In the normal hill event in ski jumping, two silver medals were awarded for a second place tie. No bronze medal was awarded for that event. In the men's 1000 meters speed skating event, two bronze medals were awarded for a third place tie.

* Host nation (United States)

| Rank | Nation | Gold | Silver | Bronze | Total |
|---|---|---|---|---|---|
| 1 | Soviet Union | 10 | 6 | 6 | 22 |
| 2 | East Germany | 9 | 7 | 7 | 23 |
| 3 | United States* | 6 | 4 | 2 | 12 |
| 4 | Austria | 3 | 2 | 2 | 7 |
| 5 | Sweden | 3 | 0 | 1 | 4 |
| 6 | Liechtenstein | 2 | 2 | 0 | 4 |
| 7 | Finland | 1 | 5 | 3 | 9 |
| 8 | Norway | 1 | 3 | 6 | 10 |
| 9 | Netherlands | 1 | 2 | 1 | 4 |
| 10 | Switzerland | 1 | 1 | 3 | 5 |
| 11 | Great Britain | 1 | 0 | 0 | 1 |
| 12 | West Germany | 0 | 2 | 3 | 5 |
| 13 | Italy | 0 | 2 | 0 | 2 |
| 14 | Canada | 0 | 1 | 1 | 2 |
| 15 | Hungary | 0 | 1 | 0 | 1 |
| 15 | Japan | 0 | 1 | 0 | 1 |
| 17 | Bulgaria | 0 | 0 | 1 | 1 |
| 17 | Czechoslovakia | 0 | 0 | 1 | 1 |
| 17 | France | 0 | 0 | 1 | 1 |
| Totals (19 entries) | | 38 | 39 | 38 | 115 |

== See also ==
- 1980 Winter Paralympics medal table
- 1980 Summer Olympics medal table
