= Márton Gyulai =

Hungarian bobsledder

- Born: 12 December 1979 (age 46)

Márton Gyulai (born 12 December 1979, Vác, Hungary) is an international sports executive, with significant experience in bidding for, and organising world- and European championships, mainly in athletics.

Gyulai graduated from the University of Notre Dame in 2001 with a degree in International Government. He competed as an athletics sprinter while there.

Following his graduation, Gyulai became a Hungarian bobsledder who competed internationally from 2001 to 2006. Competing in two Winter Olympics, he earned his best finish of 23rd in the four-man event at Salt Lake City in 2002, and is the only Hungarian to date to drive both the 2-man and the 4-man sled in the same games; the 2006 Winter Olympics.

Upon retirement from the sport, Gyulai worked for Eurosport Hungary before taking on the role of the General Secretary of the Hungarian Athletics Association in 2008. In 2011 together with Attila Spiriev and Péter Deutsch they launched the Gyulai István Memorial - Hungarian Athletics Grand Prix. In 2015 Gyulai became the youngest member to be elected to the Council of European Athletics under the presidency of Svein Arne Hansen.

In 2018 Gyulai led the Budapest bid to stage the 2023 World Athletics Championships and won.
