= Attila Bónis =

Hungarian alpine skier (born 1971)

Personal information
- Nationality: Hungarian
- Born: 2 April 1971 (age 53); Miercurea Ciuc, Romania

Sport
- Sport: Alpine skiing

Attila Bónis (born 2 April 1971) is a Hungarian alpine skier. He competed at the 1992 Winter Olympics and the 1994 Winter Olympics.
