= Lajos Koutny =

Hungarian ice hockey player (1939–2022)

- Born: 17 October 1939; Budapest, Hungary
- Died: 21 December 2022 (aged 83)
- Height: 6 ft 2 in (188 cm)
- Weight: 187 lb (85 kg; 13 st 5 lb)
- Played for: BVSC Budapest
- National team: Hungary
- NHL draft: Undrafted
- Playing career: ?–?

Lajos Koutny (17 October 1939 – 21 December 2022) was a Hungarian ice hockey player. He played for the Hungary men's national ice hockey team at the 1964 Winter Olympics in Innsbruck.

Koutny died on 21 December 2022, at the age of 83.
