= Mihály Martos =

Hungarian speed skater

Personal information
- Nationality: Hungarian
- Born: 1 February 1945 (age 80); Budapest, Hungary

Sport
- Sport: Speed skating

Mihály Martos (born 1 February 1945) is a Hungarian speed skater. He competed in 500 meters and 1500 meters men's speed skating at the 1964 Winter Olympics and the 1968 Winter Olympics.
