= Sándor Toldi =

Hungarian discus thrower

Personal information
- Born: 26 January 1893 Pápa, Hungary
- Died: 2 January 1955 (aged 62) Győr, Hungary

Sport
- Sport: Athletics
- Event: shot put / discus
- Club: Ferencvárosi TC

Sándor Miklós Toldi (26 January 1893 – 2 January 1955), aka Nagy, was a Hungarian track and field athlete who competed in the 1924 Summer Olympics.

== Career ==
Toldi was born in Pápa. He finished third behind Armas Taipale in the discus event at the 1914 AAA Championships.

At the 1924 Olympic Games, he was eliminated in the qualification of the discus throw competition and finished ninth overall.

He died in Győr.
