= Gábor Mayer =

Hungarian skier (born 1959)

Personal information
- Nationality: Hungarian
- Born: 22 January 1959 (age 66); Budapest, Hungary

Sport
- Sport: Biathlon, cross-country skiing

Gábor Mayer (born 22 January 1959) is a Hungarian skier. He competed at the 1984 Winter Olympics, the 1988 Winter Olympics and the 1992 Winter Olympics.
