= Zsuzsa Almássy =

Hungarian figure skater (born 1950)

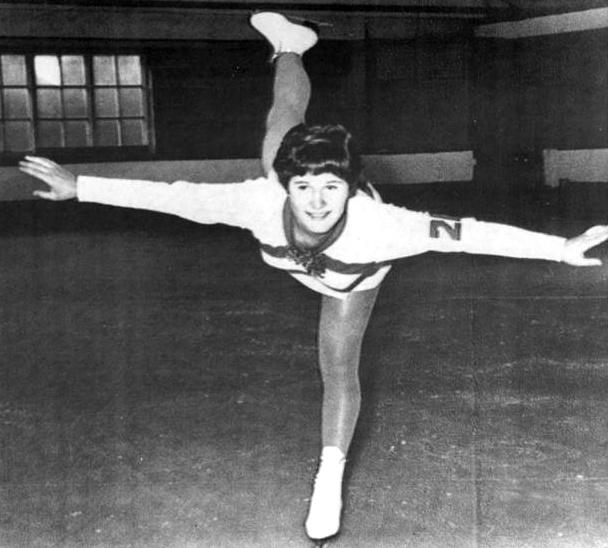
- Almássy at Richmond Trophy 1966

Personal information
- Born: 8 October 1950 (age 75)
- Height: 1.58 m (5 ft 2 in)

Figure skating career
- Country: Hungary
- Coach: Arnold Gerschwiler
- Skating club: Ferencvárosi TC
- Retired: 1972
Medal record
Representing Hungary
Figure skating: Ladies' singles
World Championships
Bronze medal – third place	1969 Colorado Springs	Ladies' singles
European Championships
Silver medal – second place	1971 Zürich	Ladies' singles
Bronze medal – third place	1970 Leningrad	Ladies' singles
Bronze medal – third place	1967 Ljubljana	Ladies' singles

Zsuzsa Almássy (born October 8, 1950 in Budapest) is a Hungarian former figure skater. She is the 1969 World bronze medalist, a three-time European medalist, and a seven-time Hungarian national champion. She competed at three Winter Olympics, placing 17th in 1964, 6th in 1968, and 5th in 1972. She was coached by Arnold Gerschwiler.

== Results ==
International
Event	62–63	63–64	64–65	65–66	66–67	67–68	68–69	69–70	70–71	71–72
Winter Olympics		17th				6th				5th
World Champ.		18th		7th		8th	3rd	5th	7th	4th
European Champ.		11th		6th	3rd	4th	4th	3rd	2nd	4th
Moscow News						1st				
Prague Skate					2nd					
Richmond Trophy				2nd	1st					
National
Hungarian Champ.	2nd	1st	2nd	1st	1st	1st	1st	1st		1st
