= Hungarian Olympic Committee =

National Olympic Committee

- Country: Hungary
- [[|]]
- Code: HUN
- Created: 19 December 1895
- Recognized: 1895
- Continental Association: EOC
- Headquarters: Budapest, Hungary
- President: Zsolt Gyulay
- Secretary General: László Fábián
- Website: olimpia.hu

The Hungarian Olympic Committee (Hungarian: Magyar Olimpiai Bizottság, pronounced [ˈmɒɟɒr ˈolimpijɒji ˈbizot͡ʃːaːɡ], MOB; IOC Code: HUN) is the National Olympic Committee representing Hungary.

== History ==
The Hungarian Olympic Committee was founded on 19 December 1895, as sixth in the world, following the French, Greek, American, German and Australian Olympic Committees.

== List of presidents ==
| President | Term |
|---|---|
| Albert Berzeviczy | 1895–1904 |
| Count Imre Széchényi | 1904–1905 |
| Count Géza Andrássy | 1905–1907 |
| Count Géza Andrássy and Gyula Muzsa | 1907–1927 |
| Gyula Muzsa | 1927–1940 |
| Lóránd Prém | 1941–1944 |
| Alajos Jámbor and Sándor Barcs | 1947–1948 |
| Gusztáv Sebes and Zsigmond Ábrai | 1948–1951 |
| Gyula Hegyi | 1951–1958 |
| Gyula Hegyi, Sándor Gáspár and Zoltán Komócsin | 1958–1962 |
| Gyula Hegyi | 1962–1964 |
| Gyula Egri | 1964–1969 |
| Sándor Beckl | 1969–1978 |
| István Buda | 1978–1986 |
| Gábor Deák | 1986–1989 |
| Pál Schmitt | 1989–2010 |
| Zsolt Borkai | 2010–2017 |
| Krisztián Kulcsár | 2017–2022 |
| Zsolt Gyulay | 2022–present |

== Member federations ==
The Hungarian National Federations are the organizations that coordinate all aspects of their individual sports. They are responsible for training, competition and development of their sports. There are currently 33 Olympic Summer and five Winter Sport Federations in Hungary.

| National Federation | Summer or Winter | Headquarters |
|---|---|---|
| Hungarian Archery Association | Summer | Budapest |
| Hungarian Athletics Association | Summer | Budapest |
| Hungarian Badminton Association | Summer | Budapest |
| Hungarian Baseball and Softball Federation | Summer | Budapest |
| Hungarian Basketball Federation | Summer | Budapest |
| Hungarian Boxing Association | Summer | Budapest |
| Hungarian Canoe Federation | Summer | Budapest |
| Hungarian Curling Federation | Winter | Budapest |
| Hungarian Cycling Federation | Summer | Budapest |
| Hungarian Diving Federation | Summer | Budapest |
| Hungarian Equestrian Federation | Summer | Budapest |
| Hungarian Fencing Federation | Summer | Budapest |
| Hungarian Football Federation | Summer | Budapest |
| Hungarian Golf Federation | Summer | Budapest |
| Hungarian Gymnastics Federation | Summer | Budapest |
| Hungarian Handball Federation | Summer | Budapest |
| Hungarian Hockey Federation | Summer | Budapest |
| Hungarian Ice Hockey Federation | Winter | Budapest |
| Hungarian Judo Association | Summer | Budapest |
| Hungarian Karate Federation | Summer | Budapest |
| Hungarian Modern Pentathlon Federation | Summer | Budapest |
| Hungarian Rowing Federation | Summer | Budapest |
| Hungarian Rugby Union | Summer | Budapest |
| Hungarian Shooting Federation | Summer | Budapest |
| Hungarian National Skating Federation | Winter | Budapest |
| Hungarian Ski Federation | Winter | Budapest |
| Hungarian Snowboard Association | Winter | Budapest |
| Hungarian Surfing Association | Summer | Budapest |
| Hungarian Swimming Association | Summer | Budapest |
| Hungarian Table Tennis Federation | Summer | Budapest |
| Hungarian Taekwondo Federation | Summer | Budapest |
| Hungarian Tennis Association | Summer | Budapest |
| Hungarian Triathlon Union | Summer | Budapest |
| Hungarian Volleyball Federation | Summer | Budapest |
| Hungarian Water Polo Federation | Summer | Budapest |
| Hungarian Weightlifting Federation | Summer | Budapest |
| Hungarian Wrestling Federation | Summer | Budapest |
| Hungarian Yachting Association | Summer | Budapest |

== See also ==
- Hungary at the Olympics
