= List of flag bearers for Belgium at the Olympics =

Belgium at the Olympics
- IOC code: BEL
- NOC: Belgian Olympic and Interfederal Committee
- Website: www.teambelgium.be (in Dutch and French)
- Medals: Gold 49 Silver 59 Bronze 68 Total 176

Summer appearances
- 1900; 1904; 1908; 1912; 1920; 1924; 1928; 1932; 1936; 1948; 1952; 1956; 1960; 1964; 1968; 1972; 1976; 1980; 1984; 1988; 1992; 1996; 2000; 2004; 2008; 2012; 2016; 2020; 2024

Winter appearances
- 1924; 1928; 1932; 1936; 1948; 1952; 1956; 1960; 1964; 1968; 1972; 1976; 1980; 1984; 1988; 1992; 1994; 1998; 2002; 2006; 2010; 2014; 2018; 2022; 2026

Other related appearances
- 1906 Intercalated Games

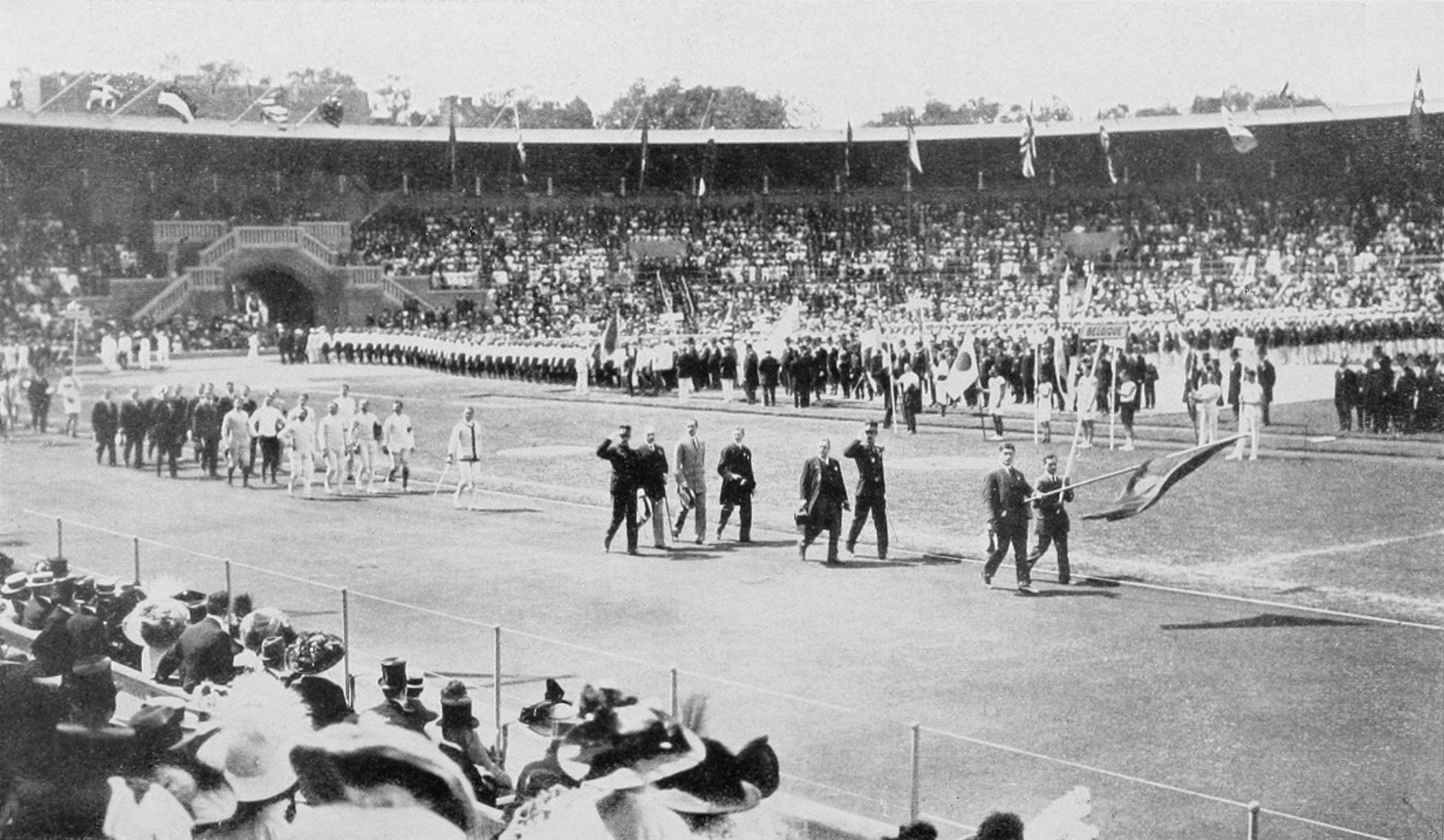
Belgium at the 1912 Summer Olympics

This is a list of flag bearers who have represented Belgium at the Olympics.

Flag bearers carry the national flag of their country at the opening ceremony of the Olympic Games.

#	Event year	Season	Flag bearer	Sex	Sport
1	1920	Summer	Victor Boin	M	Fencing
2	1936	Winter	Eric De Spoelberch	M	Bobsleigh
3	1936	Summer	Édouard Écuyer de le Court	M	Modern pentathlon
4	1948	Winter	Max Houben	M	Bobsleigh
5	1948	Summer	Charles Vyt	M	Modern pentathlon
6	1952	Summer	Charles Debeur	M	Fencing official (did not compete)
7	1956	Summer	André Nelis	M	Sailing
8	1960	Summer	André Nelis	M	Sailing
9	1964	Summer	Gaston Roelants	M	Athletics
10	1968	Summer	Gaston Roelants	M	Athletics
11	1972	Winter	Robert Blanchaer	M	Alpine skiing
12	1972	Summer	Gaston Roelants	M	Athletics
13	1976	Winter	Robert Blanchaer	M	Alpine skiing
14	1976	Summer	Gaston Roelants	M	Athletics
15	1980	Winter	Henri Mollin	M	Alpine skiing
16	1984	Winter	Henri Mollin	M	Alpine skiing
17	1984	Summer	Edgar Cuepper	M	Equestrian
18	1988	Winter	Katrien Pauwels	F	Figure skating
19	1988	Summer	Dirk Crois	M	Rowing
20	1992	Winter	Geert Blanchart	M	Short track speed skating
21	1992	Summer	Frans Peeters	M	Shooting
22	1994	Winter	Bea Pintens	F	Short track speed skating
23	1996	Summer	Jean-Michel Saive	M	Table tennis
24	1998	Winter	Conrad Alleblas	M	Speed skating
25	2000	Summer	Ulla Werbrouck	F	Judo
26	2002	Winter	Simon Van Vossel	M	Short track speed skating
27	2004	Summer	Jean-Michel Saive	M	Table tennis
28	2006	Winter	Kevin Van der Perren	M	Figure skating
29	2008	Summer	Sébastien Godefroid	M	Sailing
30	2010	Winter	Kevin Van der Perren	M	Figure skating
31	2012	Summer	Tia Hellebaut	F	Athletics
32	2014	Winter	Hanna Mariën	F	Bobsleigh
33	2016	Summer	Olivia Borlée	F	Athletics
34	2018	Winter	Seppe Smits	M	Snowboarding
35	2020	Summer	Felix Denayer	M	Field hockey
35	2020	Summer	Nafissatou Thiam	F	Athletics
36	2022	Winter	Loena Hendrickx	F	Figure skating
36	2022	Winter	Armand Marchant	M	Alpine skiing
37	2024	Summer	Jérôme Guéry	M	Equestrian
37	2024	Summer	Emma Meesseman	F	Basketball
38	2026	Winter	Hanne Desmet	F	Short-track speed skating
38	2026	Winter	~~Maximilien Drion~~	M	~~Ski mountaineering~~

== See also ==
- Belgium at the Olympics
