= Belgium at the 1906 Intercalated Games =

Belgium at the Olympics

- IOC code: BEL
- NOC: Belgian Olympic Committee

in Athens
- Competitors: 16 in 7 sports
- Medals Ranked 12th: Gold 2 Silver 1 Bronze 3 Total 6

Summer appearances
- 1900; 1904; 1908; 1912; 1920; 1924; 1928; 1932; 1936; 1948; 1952; 1956; 1960; 1964; 1968; 1972; 1976; 1980; 1984; 1988; 1992; 1996; 2000; 2004; 2008; 2012; 2016; 2020; 2024; 2028

Winter appearances
- 1924; 1928; 1932; 1936; 1948; 1952; 1956; 1960; 1964; 1968; 1972; 1976; 1980; 1984; 1988; 1992; 1994; 1998; 2002; 2006; 2010; 2014; 2018; 2022; 2026

Belgium competed at the 1906 Intercalated Games in Athens, Greece. 16 athletes, all men, competed in 22 events in 7 sports.

== Medalists ==
Medal	Name	Sport	Event
Gold	Cyrille Verbrugge	Fencing	Épée masters
Gold	Cyrille Verbrugge	Fencing	Sabre masters
Silver	Léon Dupont	Athletics	Standing high jump
Bronze	Eugène Debongnie	Cycling	Individual sprint
Bronze	Fernand de Montigny; Constant Cloquet; Edmond Crahay; Philippe Le Hardy de Beaulieu	Fencing	Épée team
Bronze	Marcel Dubois	Wrestling	Heavyweight

The rowing silver medal in the coxed pairs event over 1 mile is classed as a mixed team medal due to the Orban brothers using a Greek coxswain.

== Athletics ==
Athlete	Events	Final	
Athlete	Events	Result	Rank
Jules Lesage	Marathon	Did not finish	

Athlete	Events	Final	
Athlete	Events	Result	Rank
Léon Dupont	High jump	Unknown	Unknown
Léon Dupont	Standing high jump	1.40	2nd place, silver medalist(s)
Léon Dupont	Standing long jump	2.975	4

== Cycling ==
Athlete	Events	Heat		Semifinals		Final	
Athlete	Events	Result	Rank	Result	Rank	Result	Rank
Romeo Verschelden	Individual road race	n/a				2-41:45	4
Eugène Debongnie	Sprint	1.26 3/5	1 Q	Unknown	1 Q	Unknown	3rd place, bronze medalist(s)
Eugène Debongnie	333 metres time trial	n/a				23 3/5	5
Eugène Debongnie	5000 metres	3:09	1 Q	Unknown	3	Did not advance	
Francois Verstraeten	20 kilometres	Unknown	Unknown Q	n/a		Did not start	
Romeo Verschelden	20 kilometres	Unknown	Unknown	n/a		Did not advance	

== Fencing ==
Athlete	Events	Heat Group	Semifinal Group	Final Group
Athlete	Events	Rank	Rank	Rank
Fernand de Montigny	Individual Foil	2 Q	Unknown	Did not advance
Edmond Crahay	Individual Foil	Unknown	Did not advance	
Constant Cloquet	Individual Foil	Unknown	Did not advance	
Fernand de Montigny	Individual Épée	1 Q	Unknown	Did not advance
Edmond Crahay	Individual Épée	1 Q	Unknown	Did not advance
Cyrille Verbrugge	Épée masters	n/a		1st place, gold medalist(s)
Fernand de Montigny; Constant Cloquet; Edmond Crahay; Philippe Le Hardy de Beaulieu	Épée team	Netherlands (NED); 9-4 W	Great Britain (GBR); 9-14 L	3rd place, bronze medalist(s)
Cyrille Verbrugge	Sabre masters	n/a		1st place, gold medalist(s)

== Rowing ==
The Orban brothers arrived in Greece without a coxswain, as they didn't know they required one, so they recruited the young Greek Theophilos Psiliakos.

Athlete	Events	Final	
Athlete	Events	Result	Rank
Max Orban; Rémy Orban	Coxed pairs (1 km)	Unknown	5
Max Orban; Rémy Orban	Coxed pairs (1 mile)	8:00.0	2nd place, silver medalist(s)

== Shooting ==
Athlete	Event	Target Hits	Points	Rank
Troffaes	Rifle Kneeling or Standing, 300 metres	23	125	32

== Weightlifting ==
Athlete	Event	Weight	Rank
Marcel Dubois	One hand lift	60.40	8
Marcel Dubois	Two hand lift	108.5	7

== Wrestling ==
Greco-Roman

Athlete	Event	Round 1	Quarterfinals	Semifinals	Final Group		
Athlete	Event	Opposition Result	Opposition Result	Opposition Result	Opposition Result	Opposition Result	Rank
Renè Dobrinovitz	Lightweight	Skouteris (GRE); W	n/a	Watzl (AUT); L	Did not advance		4
Sauveur	Middleweight	Sullivan (USA); W	Weckman (FIN); L	Did not advance			5
Marcel Dubois	Heavyweight	Born (GER); W	Christopoulos (GRE); W	Jensen (DEN); L	Baur (AUT); L	Did not advance	3rd place, bronze medalist(s)
