= Belgium at the 1936 Winter Olympics =

- IOC code: BEL
- NOC: Belgian Olympic Committee

in Garmisch-Partenkirchen
- Competitors: 27 (24 men, 3 women) in 5 sports
- Flag bearer: Eric Vicomte de Spoelberch
- Medals: Gold 0 Silver 0 Bronze 0 Total 0

Winter Olympics appearances (overview)
- 1924; 1928; 1932; 1936; 1948; 1952; 1956; 1960; 1964; 1968; 1972; 1976; 1980; 1984; 1988; 1992; 1994; 1998; 2002; 2006; 2010; 2014; 2018; 2022; 2026

Belgium competed at the 1936 Winter Olympics in Garmisch-Partenkirchen, Germany.

== Alpine skiing ==
Men

Athlete	Event	Downhill		Slalom			Total	
Athlete	Event	Time	Rank	Time 1	Time 2	Rank	Total points	Rank
Charles Bracht	Combined	DNF	–	–	–	–	DNF	–
Jacques Peten	Combined	10:09.2	52	2:24.9 (+0:06)	DSQ	–	DNF	–
Werner de Spoelberch	Combined	7:03.0	44	2:28.6	DSQ	–	DNF	–
Raymond de Braconnier	Combined	6:52.0	42	2:22.2	DSQ	–	DNF	–

== Bobsleigh ==
Sled	Athletes	Event	Run 1		Run 2		Run 3		Run 4		Total	
Sled	Athletes	Event	Time	Rank	Time	Rank	Time	Rank	Time	Rank	Time	Rank
BEL-1	Rene Baron Lunden; Eric Vicomte de Spoelberch	Two-man	1:25.82	5	1:24.35	9	1:32.31	16	1:23.80	7	5:46.28	8
BEL-2	Max Houben; Martial van Schelle	Two-man	1:31.73	16	1:24.05	7	1:26.13	6	1:25.41	11	5:47.32	9

Sled	Athletes	Event	Run 1		Run 2		Run 3		Run 4		Total	
Sled	Athletes	Event	Time	Rank	Time	Rank	Time	Rank	Time	Rank	Time	Rank
BEL-1	Rene Baron Lunden; Eric Vicomte de Spoelberch; Philippe de Pret Roose; Gaston Braun	Four-man	1:25.77	10	1:21.81	5	1:21.67	7	1:20.57	6	5:29.82	8
BEL-2	Max Houben; Martial van Schelle; Louis de Ridder; Paul Graeffe	Four-man	1:22.22	2	1:23.52	9	1:22.50	8	1:20.68	8	5:28.92	5

== Figure skating ==
Women

Athlete	Event	CF	FS	Places	Points	Final rank
Yvonne de Ligne	Women's singles	19	15	118	348.2	18
Liselotte Landbeck	Women's singles	3	6	32	393.3	4

Pairs

Athletes	Points	Score	Final rank
Louise Contamine; Robert Verdun	138.5	8.2	16

== Ice hockey ==
=== Group C ===
Top two teams advanced to semifinals

	Pld	W	L	T	GF	GA	Pts
Czechoslovakia	3	3	0	0	10	0	6
Hungary	3	2	1	0	14	5	4
France	3	1	2	0	4	7	2
Belgium	3	0	3	0	4	20	0

6 February	Hungary	11–2 (1–1, 2–0, 8–1)	Belgium
7 February	Czechoslovakia	5–0 (0–0, 4–0, 1–0)	Belgium
8 February	France	4–2 (1–0, 0–1, 0–0, 1–1, 2–0)	Belgium

Contestants; Robert Baudinne; Roger Bureau; Joseph Lekens; Georges Pootmans; Pierre van Reysschoot; Willy Kreitz; Carlos van den Driessche; Walter Bastenie; Fernand Carez; Louis de Ridder

== Speed skating ==
Men

Event	Athlete	Race	
Event	Athlete	Time	Rank
500 m	Charles de Ligne	1:44.6	35
500 m	James Graeffe	54.6	33
1500 m	Charles de Ligne	3:21.9	37
1500 m	James Graeffe	3:00.5	36
5000 m	Charles de Ligne	DSQ	–
5000 m	James Graeffe	10:52.6	35
10,000 m	Charles de Ligne	23:32.9	28

== Sources ==
- von le Fort, Peter, ed. (1936). IV. Olympische Winterspiele 1936 Amtlicher Bericht (PDF) (in German). Berlin: Reichssportverlag. Archived from the original (PDF) on 2007-08-09.
- Olympic Winter Games 1936, full results by sports-reference.com
