= Belgium at the 1952 Winter Olympics =

- IOC code: BEL
- NOC: Belgian Olympic Committee

in Oslo
- Competitors: 9 (men) in 3 sports
- Medals: Gold 0 Silver 0 Bronze 0 Total 0

Winter Olympics appearances (overview)
- 1924; 1928; 1932; 1936; 1948; 1952; 1956; 1960; 1964; 1968; 1972; 1976; 1980; 1984; 1988; 1992; 1994; 1998; 2002; 2006; 2010; 2014; 2018; 2022; 2026

Belgium competed at the 1952 Winter Olympics in Oslo, Norway.

== Alpine skiing ==
Men

Athlete	Event	Race 1		Race 2		Total	
Athlete	Event	Time	Rank	Time	Rank	Time	Rank
Denis Feron	Downhill					3:36.5	63
Michel Feron	Downhill					3:31.5	61
Denis Feron	Giant Slalom					3:19.2	73
Michel Feron	Giant Slalom					3:14.0	69
Michel Feron	Slalom	1:27.0	73	did not advance			
Denis Feron	Slalom	1:21.1	65	did not advance			

== Bobsleigh ==
Sled	Athletes	Event	Run 1		Run 2		Run 3		Run 4		Total	
Sled	Athletes	Event	Time	Rank	Time	Rank	Time	Rank	Time	Rank	Time	Rank
BEL-1	Marcel Leclef; Albert Casteleyns	Two-man	1:22.09	3	1:23.69	6	1:22.94	6	1:23.79	7	5:32.51	6
BEL-2	Charles de Sorgher; André de Wulf	Two-man	1:29.49	16	1:29.00	18	1:29.29	18	1:30.50	18	5:58.28	18

== Speed skating ==
Men

Event	Athlete	Race	
Event	Athlete	Time	Rank
500 m	Jean Massez	49.2	39
500 m	Robert Laboubée	47.2	35
1500 m	Jean Massez	2:43.8	39
1500 m	Robert Laboubée	2:36.4	37
5000 m	Pierre Huylebroeck	9:34.4	35
