= Belgium at the 1924 Winter Olympics =

- IOC code: BEL
- NOC: Belgian Olympic Committee

in Chamonix
- Competitors: 18 (17 men, 1 woman) in 4 sports
- Medals Ranked 10th: Gold 0 Silver 0 Bronze 1 Total 1

Winter Olympics appearances (overview)
- 1924; 1928; 1932; 1936; 1948; 1952; 1956; 1960; 1964; 1968; 1972; 1976; 1980; 1984; 1988; 1992; 1994; 1998; 2002; 2006; 2010; 2014; 2018; 2022; 2026

Belgium competed at the 1924 Winter Olympics in Chamonix, France.

== Medalists ==
Medal	Name	Sport	Event	Date
Bronze	Charles Mulder; René Mortiaux; Paul van den Broeck; Victor Verschueren; Henri Willems	Bobsleigh	Four/five-man	February 3

== Bobsleigh ==
Sled	Athletes	Event	Run 1		Run 2		Run 3		Run 4		Total	
Sled	Athletes	Event	Time	Rank	Time	Rank	Time	Rank	Time	Rank	Time	Rank
BEL	Charles Mulder; René Mortiaux; Paul Van den Broeck; Victor Verschueren; Henri Willems	Four/five-man	1:29.89	3	1:34.22	3	1:29.98	3	1:28.20	3	6:02.29	3rd place, bronze medalist(s)

== Figure skating ==
Men

Athlete	Event	CF	FS	Points	Places	Final rank
Freddy Mésot	Men's singles	8	7	266.18	54	9

Pairs

Athletes	Points	Score	Final rank
Georgette Herbos; Georges Wagemans	37	8.82	5

== Ice hockey ==
=== Group B ===
The top two teams (highlighted) advanced to the medal round.

Team	GP	W	L	GF	GA
United States	3	3	0	52	0
Great Britain	3	2	1	34	16
France	3	1	2	9	42
Belgium	3	0	3	8	45

28 Jan	United States	19:0 (9:0,6:0,4:0)	Belgium
30 Jan	Great Britain	19:3 (8:1,6:1,5:1)	Belgium
31 Jan	France	7:5 (3:3,3:1,1:1)	Belgium

—	Belgium
	Louis De Ridder; François Franck; Henri Louette; André Poplimont; Fréderic Rudolph; Paul Van den Broeck; Charles Van den Driessche; Philippe Van Volckxsom; Gaston Van Volxem; Viktor Verschueren

== Speed skating ==
Men

Event	Athlete	Race	
Event	Athlete	Time	Rank
500 m	Louis de Ridder	52.8	19
500 m	Gaston van Hazebroeck	55.8	22
500 m	Philippe van Volckxsom	56.4	23
500 m	Marcel Moens	1:02.2	26
1500 m	Gaston van Hazebroeck	2:54.8	17
1500 m	Louis de Ridder	3:01.8	19
1500 m	Philippe van Volckxsom	3:14.6	20
1500 m	Marcel Moens	3:16.8	21
5000 m	Gaston van Hazebroeck	10:13.8	17
5000 m	Marcel Moens	11:30.4	21

All-round
Distances: 500m; 5000m; 1500m & 10,000m.

Athlete	Until distance 1			Until distance 2			Until distance 3			Total		
Athlete	Points	Score	rank	Points	Score	rank	Points	Score	rank	Points	Score	rank
Gaston van Hazebroeck	17	55.80	17	26	117.18	13	33	175.45	11	DNF		
Marcel Moens	21	62.20	21	28	131.24	15	39	196.84	13	DNF		
Louis de Ridder	14	52.80	14	DNF								
Philippe van Volckxsom	18.5	56.40	18	DNF								
