= Belgium at the 1956 Winter Olympics =

- IOC code: BEL
- NOC: Belgian Olympic Committee

in Cortina d'Ampezzo
- Competitors: 4 (men) in 3 sports
- Medals: Gold 0 Silver 0 Bronze 0 Total 0

Winter Olympics appearances (overview)
- 1924; 1928; 1932; 1936; 1948; 1952; 1956; 1960; 1964; 1968; 1972; 1976; 1980; 1984; 1988; 1992; 1994; 1998; 2002; 2006; 2010; 2014; 2018; 2022; 2026

Belgium competed at the 1956 Winter Olympics in Cortina d'Ampezzo, Italy.

== Alpine skiing ==
Men

Athlete	Event	Race 1		Race 2		Total	
Athlete	Event	Time	Rank	Time	Rank	Time	Rank
Denis Feron	Downhill					4:16.6	38
Denis Feron	Giant Slalom					4:01.8	65
Denis Feron	Slalom	2:12.5	49	2:37.0	47	4:49.5	46

== Bobsleigh ==
Sled	Athletes	Event	Run 1		Run 2		Run 3		Run 4		Total	
Sled	Athletes	Event	Time	Rank	Time	Rank	Time	Rank	Time	Rank	Time	Rank
BEL-1	Marcel Leclef; Albert Casteleyns	Two-man	1:27.30	18	1:25.93	13	1:25.60	10	1:25.98	12	5:44.81	13

== Speed skating ==
Men

Event	Athlete	Race	
Event	Athlete	Time	Rank
1500 m	Pierre Huylebroeck	DNF	–
