= Feron =

Feron may refer to:

- Féron, a commune in northern France
- Feron (wasp), a genus of wasps
- Feron (comics), a character in Marvel Comics
- Ferón, a legendary High King of Ireland
- Denis L. Feron (1928–2015), Belgian alpine skier and businessman
- Éloi Firmin Féron (1802–1876), French painter
- Michel Feron (1923–2014), Belgian alpine skier
