= Pintens =

Pintens is a surname. Notable people with the surname include:

- Bea Pintens (born 1972), Belgian short track speed skater
- Craig Pintens (born 1975), Athletic Director at Loyola Marymount University
- Georges Pintens (born 1946), professional road bicycle racer from Belgium
- Henri Pintens, early 20th century Belgian tug of war competitor
- Sofie Pintens (born 1974), Belgian short track speed skater

== See also ==
- Joseph G. Pinten
