= Belgium at the 1948 Winter Olympics =

- IOC code: BEL
- NOC: Belgian Olympic Committee

in St. Moritz
- Competitors: 11 (10 men, 1 woman) in 4 sports
- Flag bearer: Max Houben
- Medals Ranked 9th: Gold 1 Silver 1 Bronze 0 Total 2

Winter Olympics appearances (overview)
- 1924; 1928; 1932; 1936; 1948; 1952; 1956; 1960; 1964; 1968; 1972; 1976; 1980; 1984; 1988; 1992; 1994; 1998; 2002; 2006; 2010; 2014; 2018; 2022; 2026

Belgium competed at the 1948 Winter Olympics in St. Moritz, Switzerland.

== Medalists ==
Medal	Name	Sport	Event
Gold	Micheline Lannoy; Pierre Baugniet	Figure skating	Pairs
Silver	Max Houben; Freddy Mansveld; Louis-Georges Niels; Jacques Mouvet	Bobsleigh	Four-man

== Alpine skiing ==
Men

Athlete	Event	Race 1		Race 2		Total	
Athlete	Event	Time	Rank	Time	Rank	Time	Rank
Philippe d'Ursel	Downhill					3:51.0	70
Michel Feron	Downhill					3:34.3	50

Men's combined

The downhill part of this event was held along with the main medal event of downhill skiing. For athletes competing in both events, the same time was used (see table above for the results). The slalom part of the event was held separate from the main medal event of slalom skiing (included in table below).

Athlete	Slalom			Total (downhill + slalom)	
Athlete	Time 1	Time 2	Rank	Points	Rank
Michel Feron	1:43.0	1:27.8	54	46.52	42
Philippe, Count d'Ursel	1:31.4	1:15.8	34	45.14	39

== Bobsleigh ==
Sled	Athletes	Event	Run 1		Run 2		Run 3		Run 4		Total	
Sled	Athletes	Event	Time	Rank	Time	Rank	Time	Rank	Time	Rank	Time	Rank
BEL-1	Max Houben; Jacques Mouvet	Two-man	1:24:4	3	1:24.4	4	1:24.5	10	1:24.2	6	5:37.5	4
BEL-2	Marcel Leclef; Louis-Georges Niels	Two-man	1:26.8	12	1:24.9	7	1:23.6	4	1:24.5	9	5:39.8	10

Sled	Athletes	Event	Run 1		Run 2		Run 3		Run 4		Total	
Sled	Athletes	Event	Time	Rank	Time	Rank	Time	Rank	Time	Rank	Time	Rank
BEL-1	Max Houben; Freddy Mansveld; Louis-Georges Niels; Jacques Mouvet	Four-man	1:17.3	3	1:20.9	6	1:22.0	5	1:21.1	1	5:21.3	2nd place, silver medalist(s)

== Figure skating ==
Men

Athlete	CF	FS	Points	Places	Final rank
Fernand Leemans	11	14	157.822	104	11

Pairs

Athletes	Points	Places	Final rank
Micheline Lannoy; Pierre Baugniet	11.227	17.5	1st place, gold medalist(s)

== Speed skating ==
Men

Event	Athlete	Race	
Event	Athlete	Time	Rank
500 m	Pierre Huylebroeck	48.3	40
1500 m	Pierre Huylebroeck	2:40.2	45
5000 m	Pierre Huylebroeck	9:20.3	30
10,000 m	Pierre Huylebroeck	19:54.8	12

== Sources ==
- Comité Olympique Suisse (January 1951). Rapport Général sur les V^{es} Jeux Olympiques d'hiver St-Moritz 1948 (PDF) (in French). Lausanne: H. Jaunin. Archived from the original (PDF) on 2008-04-10.
- "Olympic Medal Winners". International Olympic Committee. Archived from the original on 13 June 2008.
- Olympic Winter Games 1948, full results by sports-reference.com
