= Belgium at the 1976 Winter Olympics =

- IOC code: BEL
- NOC: Belgian Olympic Committee

in Innsbruck
- Competitors: 4 (3 men, 1 woman) in 2 sports
- Flag bearer: Robert Blanchaer
- Medals: Gold 0 Silver 0 Bronze 0 Total 0

Winter Olympics appearances (overview)
- 1924; 1928; 1932; 1936; 1948; 1952; 1956; 1960; 1964; 1968; 1972; 1976; 1980; 1984; 1988; 1992; 1994; 1998; 2002; 2006; 2010; 2014; 2018; 2022; 2026

Belgium competed at the 1976 Winter Olympics in Innsbruck, Austria.

== Alpine skiing ==
Men

Athlete	Event	Race 1		Race 2		Total	
Athlete	Event	Time	Rank	Time	Rank	Time	Rank
Robert Blanchaer	Downhill					1:54.30	45
Didier Xhaet	Downhill					1:53.56	43
Didier Xhaet	Giant Slalom	DNF	–	–	–	DNF	–
Robert Blanchaer	Giant Slalom	1:57.37	55	2:00.53	41	3:57.90	40
Robert Blanchaer	Slalom	DNF	–	–	–	DNF	–
Didier Xhaet	Slalom	DNF	–	–	–	DNF	–

== Speed skating ==
Men

Event	Athlete	Race	
Event	Athlete	Time	Rank
1500 m	Gilbert van Eesbeeck	2:12.74	28
5000 m	Gilbert van Eesbeeck	8:29.78	30

Women

Event	Athlete	Race	
Event	Athlete	Time	Rank
500 m	Linda Rombouts	48.31	27
1500 m	Linda Rombouts	2:32.96	26
3000 m	Linda Rombouts	5:10.35	26

== Sources ==
- Official Olympic Reports
- Olympic Winter Games 1976, full results by sports-reference.com
