= Belgium at the 1980 Winter Olympics =

- IOC code: BEL
- NOC: Belgian Olympic and Interfederal Committee

in Lake Placid
- Competitors: 2 (men) in 1 sport
- Flag bearer: Henri Mollin
- Medals: Gold 0 Silver 0 Bronze 0 Total 0

Winter Olympics appearances (overview)
- 1924; 1928; 1932; 1936; 1948; 1952; 1956; 1960; 1964; 1968; 1972; 1976; 1980; 1984; 1988; 1992; 1994; 1998; 2002; 2006; 2010; 2014; 2018; 2022; 2026

Belgium competed at the 1980 Winter Olympics in Lake Placid, United States.

== Alpine skiing ==
Men

Athlete	Event	Race 1		Race 2		Total	
Athlete	Event	Time	Rank	Time	Rank	Time	Rank
Didier Lamont	Downhill					1:57.57	34
Henri Mollin	Downhill					1:55.83	33
Henri Mollin	Giant Slalom	1:33.02	55	DNF	–	DNF	–
Didier Lamont	Giant Slalom	1:32.54	53	1:33.14	45	3:05.68	47
Didier Lamont	Slalom	DNF	–	–	–	DNF	–
Henri Mollin	Slalom	1:01.49	29	57.40	24	1:58.89	24

== Sources ==
- Official Olympic Reports
- Olympic Winter Games 1980, full results by sports-reference.com
