= Belgium at the 1984 Winter Olympics =

- IOC code: BEL
- NOC: Belgian Olympic and Interfederal Committee

in Sarajevo
- Competitors: 4 (2 men, 2 women) in 2 sports
- Flag bearer: Henri Mollin
- Medals: Gold 0 Silver 0 Bronze 0 Total 0

Winter Olympics appearances (overview)
- 1924; 1928; 1932; 1936; 1948; 1952; 1956; 1960; 1964; 1968; 1972; 1976; 1980; 1984; 1988; 1992; 1994; 1998; 2002; 2006; 2010; 2014; 2018; 2022; 2026

Belgium competed at the 1984 Winter Olympics in Sarajevo, Yugoslavia.

== Alpine skiing ==
Men

Athlete	Event	Race 1		Race 2		Total	
Athlete	Event	Time	Rank	Time	Rank	Time	Rank
Henri Mollin	Downhill					1:55.72	46
Pierre Couquelet	Downhill					1:52.40	40
Henri Mollin	Giant Slalom	DNF	–	–	–	DNF	–
Pierre Couquelet	Giant Slalom	1:28.71	35	1:29.88	37	2:58.59	35
Pierre Couquelet	Slalom	DNF	–	–	–	DNF	–
Henri Mollin	Slalom	1:00.07	34	DNF	–	DNF	–

Women

Athlete	Event	Race 1		Race 2		Total	
Athlete	Event	Time	Rank	Time	Rank	Time	Rank
Michèle Brigitte Dombard	Downhill					1:18.92	27
Michèle Brigitte Dombard	Giant Slalom	1:15.85	45	1:18.94	37	2:34.79	37

== Figure skating ==
Women

Athlete	CF	SP	FS	TFP	Rank
Katrien Pauwels	14	16	18	32.8	16

== Sources ==
- Official Olympic Reports
- Olympic Winter Games 1984, full results by sports-reference.com
