= Belgium at the 2026 Winter Olympics =

- Flag of Belgium
- IOC code: BEL
- NOC: Belgian Olympic and Interfederal Committee
- Website: www.teambelgium.be (in Dutch and French)

in Milan and Cortina d'Ampezzo, Italy 6 February 2026 – 22 February 2026
- Competitors: 30 (14 men and 16 women) in 9 sports
- Flag bearer (opening): Hanne Desmet
- Flag bearers (closing): Ward Pétré & Tineke den Dulk
- Medals Ranked 29th: Gold 0 Silver 0 Bronze 1 Total 1

Winter Olympics appearances (overview)
- 1924; 1928; 1932; 1936; 1948; 1952; 1956; 1960; 1964; 1968; 1972; 1976; 1980; 1984; 1988; 1992; 1994; 1998; 2002; 2006; 2010; 2014; 2018; 2022; 2026

Belgium competed at the 2026 Winter Olympics in Milan and Cortina d'Ampezzo, Italy, from 6 to 22 February 2026.

Short track speed skater Hanne Desmet was the country's flagbearer during the opening ceremony.

Short track speed skating mixed relay bronze medal winners Ward Pétré and Tineke den Dulk were the flagbearers during the closing ceremony.

== Competitors ==
The following is the list of number of competitors participating at the Games per sport/discipline.

Sport	Men	Women	Total
Alpine skiing	2	1	3
Biathlon	4	4	8
Bobsleigh	0	1	1
Figure skating	0	2	2
Short-track speed skating	4	2	6
Skeleton	0	1	1
Ski mountaineering	1	0	1
Snowboarding	0	2	2
Speed skating	3	3	6
Total	14	16	30

== Medallists ==
Medal	Name	Sport	Event	Date
Bronze	Hanne Desmet; Stijn Desmet; Tineke den Dulk; Ward Pétré	Short-track speed skating	Mixed 2000 metre relay	10 February

== Alpine skiing ==
Belgium qualified one female and one male alpine skier through the basic quota (D.1) and a second male alpine skier through the Olympic Quota Allocation List (D.3).

Men

Athlete	Event	Run 1		Run 2		Total	
Athlete	Event	Time	Rank	Time	Rank	Time	Rank
Sam Maes	Men's giant slalom	DNF					
Sam Maes	Men's slalom	DNF					
Armand Marchant	Men's slalom	57.34	5	58.27	18	1:55.61	5

Women

Athlete	Event	Run 1		Run 2		Total	
Athlete	Event	Time	Rank	Time	Rank	Time	Rank
Kim Vanreusel	Women's slalom	51.46	41	55.71	33	1:47.17	34

== Biathlon ==
Belgium qualified four female and four male biathletes through the 2024–25 Biathlon World Cup score.

Men

Athlete	Event	Time	Misses	Rank
Florent Claude	Individual	58:04.2	3 (1-2-0-0)	46
Florent Claude	Pursuit	36:52.6	6 (2-1-2-1)	50
Florent Claude	Sprint	25:13.9	2 (1+1)	38
Thierry Langer	Individual	58:35.8	3 (0-1-2-0)	52
Thierry Langer	Sprint	27:11.3	3 (1+2)	85
Florent Claude; Thierry Langer; Marek Mackels; Sam Parmantier	Relay	1:26:55.8	0+18	19

Women

Athlete	Event	Time	Misses	Rank
Eve Bouvard	Sprint	24:06.3	2 (1+1)	74
Eve Bouvard	Individual	50:13.9	5 (0-2-2-1)	83
Maya Cloetens	Individual	44:52.1	2 (1-1-0-0)	33
Maya Cloetens	Pursuit	34:00.6	5 (2+0+3+0)	37
Maya Cloetens	Sprint	22:17.8	0 (0+0)	26
Lotte Lie	Individual	44:12.8	1 (0-0-0-1)	19
Lotte Lie	Pursuit	34:35.0	3 (2+0+0+1)	47
Lotte Lie	Sprint	22:48.8	1 (0+1)	39
Eve Bouvard; Maya Cloetens; Marisa Emonts; Lotte Lie	Relay	1:15:06.5	0+6	13

Mixed

Athlete	Event	Time	Misses	Rank
Florent Claude; Thierry Langer; Lotte Lie; Maya Cloetens	Relay	1:09:00.4	0+8	18

== Bobsleigh ==
Belgium was allocated 1 quota place in the women's monobob on the basis of the Olympic Qualification System (QS) Milano Cortina 2026 for bobsleigh and skeleton.

Athlete	Event	Run 1		Run 2		Run 3		Run 4		Total	
Athlete	Event	Time	Rank	Time	Rank	Time	Rank	Time	Rank	Time	Rank
Kelly Van Petegem	Women's monobob	1:01.14	24	1:00.50	16	1:00.42	18	1:00.10	17	4:02.16	19

== Figure skating ==
In the 2025 World Figure Skating Championships in Boston, the United States, Belgium secured one quota in the women's singles. At the ISU Skate to Milano Figure Skating Qualifier 2025 in Beijing, China, Belgium secured a second quota in the women's singles.

Athlete	Event	SP/SD		FP/FD		Total	
Athlete	Event	Points	Rank	Points	Rank	Points	Rank
Loena Hendrickx	Women's singles	70.93	7 Q	128.72	15	199.65	14
Nina Pinzarrone	Women's singles	68.97	11 Q	131.33	14	200.30	13

== Short-track speed skating ==
Belgium qualified six short-track speed skaters (four men and two women) after the conclusion of the 2025–26 ISU Short Track World Tour.

Men

Athlete	Event	Heat		Quarterfinal		Semifinal		Final	
Athlete	Event	Time	Rank	Time	Rank	Time	Rank	Time	Rank
Stijn Desmet	Men's 500 m	PEN		Did not advance					
Stijn Desmet	Men's 1000 m	1:25.581	3	Did not advance					21
Stijn Desmet	Men's 1500 m	—N/a		2:18.802	4	Did not advance			21
Stijn Desmet; Adriaan Dewagtere; Ward Pétré; Warre Van Damme	5000 m relay	—N/a				6:52.978	3 FB	6:51.672	6

Women

Athlete	Event	Heat		Quarterfinal		Semifinal		Final	
Athlete	Event	Time	Rank	Time	Rank	Time	Rank	Time	Rank
Hanne Desmet	Women's 500 m	43.182	1 Q	43.139	4	Did not advance			13
Hanne Desmet	Women's 1000 m	1:29.661	1 Q	1:27.533	1 Q	PEN		Did not advance	10
Hanne Desmet	Women's 1500 m	2:24.365	1 Q	3:10.532	6	Did not advance			17
Tineke den Dulk	Women's 1500 m	2:28.037	1 Q	2:26.300	7	Did not advance			19

Mixed

Athlete	Event	Quarterfinal		Semifinal		Final	
Athlete	Event	Time	Rank	Time	Rank	Time	Rank
Tineke den Dulk; Hanne Desmet; Stijn Desmet; Ward Pétré	2000 m relay	2.39.932	3 q	2.39.974	2 FA	2.39.353	3rd place, bronze medalist(s)

Key: FA = Qualified to medal round; FB = Qualified to consolation round; PEN = Penalty; Q = Qualified to next round based on position in heat; q = Qualified to next round based on time in field

== Skeleton ==
Belgium was allocated 1 quota place in the women's skeleton on the basis of the Olympic Qualification System (QS) Milano Cortina 2026 for bobsleigh and skeleton.

Athlete	Event	Run 1		Run 2		Run 3		Run 4		Total	
Athlete	Event	Time	Rank	Time	Rank	Time	Rank	Time	Rank	Time	Rank
Kim Meylemans	Women's	57.70	=6	57.62	8	57.49	3	57.86	9	3:50.67	6

== Ski mountaineering ==
Belgium qualified one male ski mountaineer through the Olympic ranking lists.

Athlete	Event	Heat		Semifinal		Final	
Athlete	Event	Time	Rank	Time	Rank	Time	Rank
Maximilien Drion	Men's sprint	2:42.40	3 Q	2:47.23	5	Did not advance	9

== Snowboarding ==
Belgium qualified two female Slopestyle & Big Air snowboarders through the basic quota.

Athlete	Event	Qualification					Final				
Athlete	Event	Run 1	Run 2	Run 3	Best	Rank	Run 1	Run 2	Run 3	Best	Rank
Sky Remans	Big air	24.75	73.50	24.50	98.25	27	Did not advance				
Evy Poppe	Slopestyle	35.33	36.96	—N/a	36.96	29	Did not advance				
Sky Remans	Slopestyle	28.13	25.48	—N/a	28.13	30	Did not advance				

== Speed skating ==
Following the conclusion of the ISU World Cup Speed Skating Competitions designated for qualification of event quota places for the XXV Olympic Winter Games 2026, Belgian women speed skaters were allocated 1 quota each for the 1000 metres, the 1500 metres, the 3000 metres, the 5000 metres, and the team sprint as well as 2 quota in the mass start. Belgian male speed skaters were allocated 1 quota each for the 1000 metres, the 1500 metres, the 5000 metres, and the 10000 metres, as well as 2 quota in the mass start. Belgium obtained an additional quotum for the women's 500 and 1000 metres through the reallocation process of on-site unused event quota places by the International Skating Union.

Athlete	Event	Final	
Athlete	Event	Time	Rank
Mathias Vosté	Men's 1000 m	1:09.199	17
Mathias Vosté	Men's 1500 m	1:47.19	24
Bart Swings	Men's 5000 m	6:19.27	15
Bart Swings	Men's 10,000 m	13:05.60	10
Fran Vanhoutte	Women's 500 m	38.63	23
Fran Vanhoutte	Women's 1000 m	1:16.93	23
Isabelle van Elst	Women's 1000 m	1:16.68	20
Isabelle van Elst	Women's 1500 m	1:57.82	20
Sandrine Tas	Women's 3000 m	4:01.26	7
Sandrine Tas	Women's 5000 m	6:46.47 NR	4

Mass start

Athlete	Event	Semifinal			Final		
Athlete	Event	Points	Time	Rank	Points	Time	Rank
Indra Médard	Men's	3	7:44.03	6 Q	1	8:26.25	8
Bart Swings	Men's	7	7:52.03	5 Q	0	8:05.37	9
Sandrine Tas	Women's	9	8:37.28	5 Q	1	8:47.72	13
Fran Vanhoutte	Women's	10	8:44.36	4 Q	3	8:58.71	9

Team pursuit

Athlete	Event	Quarterfinal		Semifinal		Final	
Athlete	Event	Opposition Time	Rank	Opposition Time	Rank	Opposition Time	Rank
Sandrine Tas; Isabelle van Elst; Fran Vanhoutte	Women's team pursuit	Canada; L 3:01.33	6 FC	Did not advance		Germany; L 3:04.92	6

Key: FA = Qualified to gold medal round; FB = Qualified to bronze medal round; FC = Qualified for Final C;L = Lost; OR = Olympic record; Q = Qualified to next round; W = Won

== See also ==
- Belgium at the 2026 Winter Paralympics
