= Elsie Foster Cassatt =

American sportswoman and socialite (1875–1931)

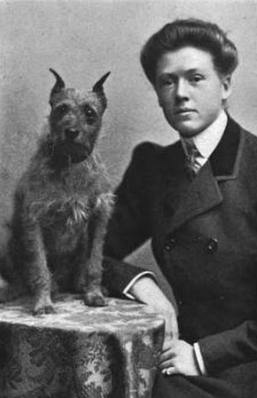
- Elsie Foster Cassatt, from a 1901 publication.
- Born: Elizabeth Foster Cassatt; August 14, 1875; Pennsylvania, U.S.
- Died: May 31, 1931 (aged 55); New York, U.S.
- Occupation(s): golfer, socialite
- Known for: subject and owner of portraits by her aunt, Mary Cassatt

Elizabeth "Elsie" Foster Cassatt Stewart (August 14, 1875 – May 31, 1931) was an American sportswoman and socialite.

== Early life ==
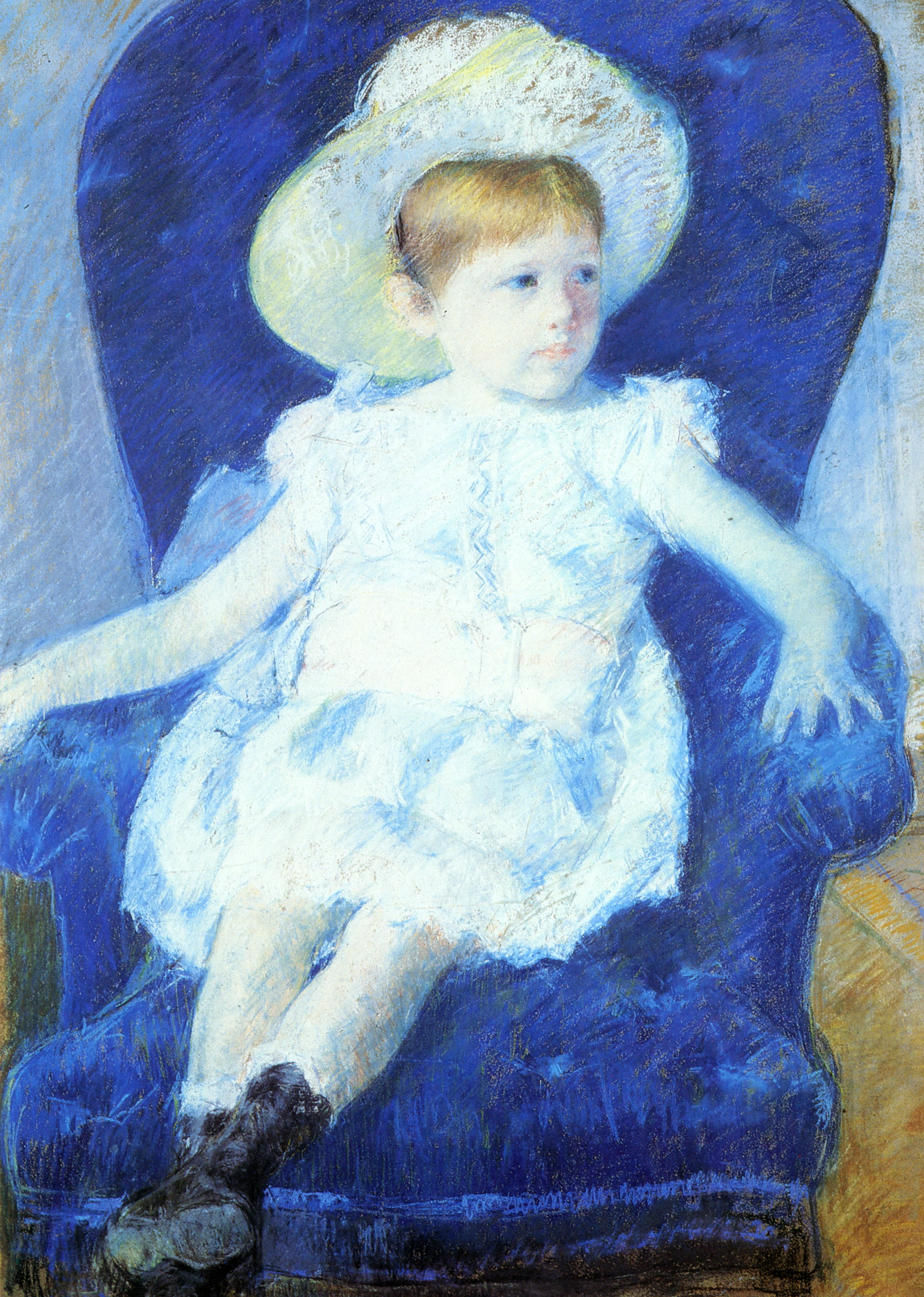
"Elsie in a Blue Chair" (1883), by Mary Cassatt; the subject was the painter's niece, Elsie Foster Cassatt.

Cassatt was born in Pennsylvania, the daughter of Alexander Cassatt and Lois Buchanan Cassatt. Her father was president of the Pennsylvania Railroad. Her older brother was soldier and horse breeder Edward B. Cassatt. Her mother's uncle was United States president James Buchanan. Her father's sister was the painter Mary Cassatt. As a child, Elsie visited her aunt in France, and was the subject of some of Mary Cassatt's portraits, including "Katherine Cassatt Reading to her Grandchildren", "Elsie in a Blue Chair" and "Elsie Cassatt Holding a Big Dog".

== Career ==
Cassatt was described as "a young woman whose every curve speaks of her athletic training and fine physical condition... a modern Diana: she rides, swims, shoots, and plays tennis." She was also known as a cricketer and a serious golfer before she married. She played in the U.S. Women's Amateur in 1899 and in 1901, and was considered one of the top American women golfers of her day. She was a member of the Merion Cricket Club, with her sister Katherine, in 1900.

She loaned some of Mary Cassatt's paintings to a major exhibit held at the Pennsylvania Museum in 1927, curated by Louisine Havemeyer.

== Personal life ==
Elsie Cassatt married stockbroker W. Plunket Stewart in 1902, and divorced him in 1930; he soon remarried. Her husband was a noted breeder of hunting dogs. Their daughters were Katherine, Doris, and Elsie; their only son, Alexander, died in 1912. She died in New York in 1931, aged 55 years. Her gravesite is in Bryn Mawr, Pennsylvania. Her daughter Katherine Kelso Stewart married Eric Vicomte de Spoelberch, a Belgian pilot and athlete, in 1932. The Elsie Cassatt Stewart Memorial Children's Fund was established at the Jefferson Medical College Hospital and Medical Center in Philadelphia.

== In popular culture ==
Cassatt was a character in the television film Mary Cassatt: An American Impressionist (1999), portrayed by Canadian actress Emma Taylor-Isherwood.
