= Marek Mackels =

Belgian biathlete (born 1999)

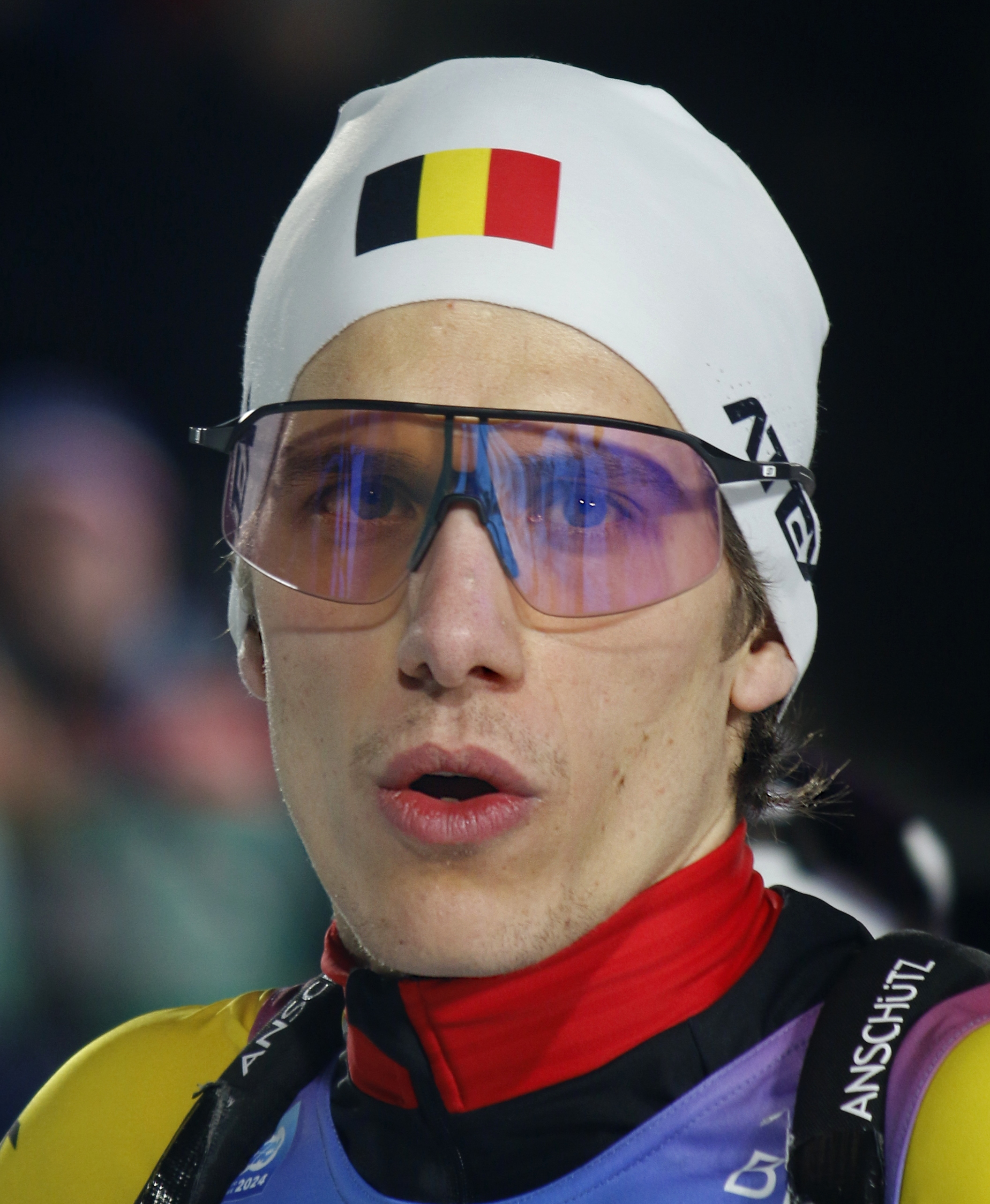
- Biathlon World Cup in Nové Město na Moravě 2024 ( Pavel Hrdlička, Wikipedia)

Personal information
- Nationality: Belgian
- Born: 18 May 1999 (age 27) Malmedy, Belgium

Sport
- Sport: Biathlon

Marek Mackels (born 18 May 1999 in Malmedy) is a Belgian biathlete. He made his debut in the World Cup in 2023. He represented Belgium at the 2026 Winter Olympics.

== Biathlon results ==
All results are sourced from the International Biathlon Union.

=== Olympic Games ===
0 medals

Event	Individual	Sprint	Pursuit	Mass start	Relay	Mixed relay
(Italy) 2026 Milano Cortina	—	—	—	—	19th	—

=== World Championships ===
0 medals

Event	Individual	Sprint	Pursuit	Mass start	Relay	Mixed relay	Single Mixed relay
(Germany) 2023 Oberhof	—	—	—	—	19th	—	—
(Czech Republic) 2024 Nové Město na Moravě	84th	80th	—	—	22nd	—	—
(Switzerland) 2025 Lenzerheide	—	81st	—	—	14th	—	—

*During Olympic seasons competitions are only held for those events not included in the Olympic program.
**The single mixed relay was added as an event in 2019.
