= Tineke den Dulk =

Belgian speed skater (born 1997)

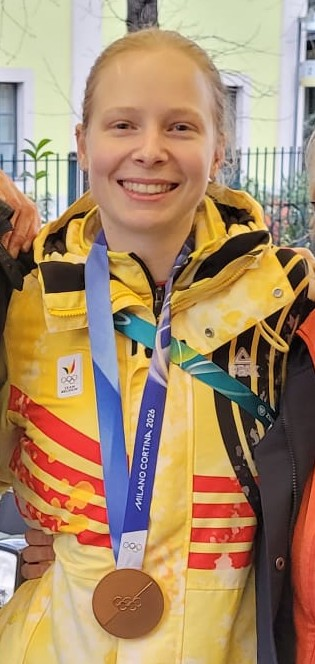
- Tineke den Dulk at the 2026 Winter Olympics

Personal information
- Born: 5 June 1997 (age 29) Leeuwarden, Netherlands

Sport
- Country: Belgium
- Sport: Short track speed skating
Medal record
Women's short track speed skating
Representing Belgium
Olympic Games
Bronze medal – third place	2026 Milano Cortina	Mixed 2000 m relay
World Championships
Bronze medal – third place	2026 Montreal	2000 m mixed relay
European Championships
Silver medal – second place	2023 Gdansk	2000 m mixed relay
Bronze medal – third place	2024 Gdansk	2000 m mixed relay
Representing Netherlands
European Championships
Gold medal – first place	2019 Dordrecht	3000 m relay
World Junior Championships
Bronze medal – third place	2016 Sofia	3000 m relay

Tineke den Dulk (born 5 June 1997) is a Belgian short-track speed skater of Dutch origin. She adopted the Belgian nationality in 2021. Den Dulk was part of the Belgian mixed relay team that won a silver and a bronze medal at the European Championships. She represented Belgium at the 2026 Winter Olympics, winning a bronze medal in the mixed relay.

== Career ==
=== Netherlands ===
Den Dulk started competitive short-track speed skating in Leeuwarden in 2008. In 2016 she was part of the Dutch team that won a bronze medal at the relay event of the World Junior Championships. In 2019 Den Dulk was part of the Dutch senior team that won a gold medal at the European Championships. Later that year, she lost her place in the Dutch national team and she decided to move to Belgium to be able to compete internationally. In 2021 she obtained the Belgian nationality.

=== Belgium ===
In 2020, Den Dulk was invited to join the Belgian national short-track team. She was part of the Belgian mixed relay team that obtained a third place overall at the 2022–23 World Cup. In 2023 and 2024 the Belgian mixed relay team, including Den Dulk, obtained a bronze and silver medal at the European Championships. The team qualified for the 2026 Winter Olympics where she won a bronze medal with the team in the mixed 2000 metre relay. A month later the Belgian mixed relay team with Den Dulk took again a bronze medal on a world stage coming in third in the 2000 m relay at the 2026 World Short Track Speed Skating Championships in Montreal, Canada.

Den Dulk has a master's degree in film and visual culture at the University of Antwerp. The university recognized Den Dulk with the 2022 Francis van Loon-award for Student-Athletes of Excellence.
