= Belgium at the 1964 Winter Olympics =

- IOC code: BEL
- NOC: Belgian Olympic Committee

in Innsbruck
- Competitors: 8 (7 men, 1 woman) in 3 sports
- Medals: Gold 0 Silver 0 Bronze 0 Total 0

Winter Olympics appearances (overview)
- 1924; 1928; 1932; 1936; 1948; 1952; 1956; 1960; 1964; 1968; 1972; 1976; 1980; 1984; 1988; 1992; 1994; 1998; 2002; 2006; 2010; 2014; 2018; 2022; 2026

Belgium participated at the 1964 Winter Olympics in Innsbruck, Belgium, held between 9 January and 9 February 1964. The country's participation in the Games marked its eighth appearance at the Winter Olympics since its debut in the 1924 Games. The Games marked the country's return to the event after missing the previous event. The Belgium team consisted of eight athletes who competed across three sports. The team did not win any medal in the competition.

== Background ==
The National Olympic Committee (NOC) of Belgium was formed on 18 February 1906 and wasrecognized by the International Olympic Committee (IOC) in the same year. It was combined with the National Committee for Physical Education and Social Hygiene in 1925, and was further renamed to Belgian Olympic and Interfederal Committee in 1978. The nation made its debut in the Winter Olympics at the first Games held in 1924 held in Chamonix, France. This edition of the Games marked the nation's eighth appearance at the Winter Games.

The 1964 Winter Olympics were held in Innsbruck, Austria between 29 January and 9 February 1964. The Belgium delegation consisted of eight athletes competing across three sports. The team did not win any medal in the competition.

== Competitors ==
There were eight athletes including who took part in the medal events across three sports.

Sport	Men	Women	Athletes
Alpine skiing	0	1	1
Bobsleigh	6	6	
Speed skating	1	0	1
Total	7	1	8

== Alpine skiing ==
Alpine skiing at the 1964 Winter Olympics took place at Axamer Lizum in Axams and consisted of three events for each gender. Patricia du Roy de Blicquy was the lone participant for Belgium and took part in three events in the women's categories.

Women

Athlete	Event	Race 1		Race 2		Total	
Athlete	Event	Time	Rank	Time	Rank	Time	Rank
Patricia du Roy de Blicquy	Downhill	—N/a				2:01.41	13
Patricia du Roy de Blicquy	Giant Slalom	—N/a				1:58.76	17
Patricia du Roy de Blicquy	Slalom	47.15	13	49.86	8	1:37.01	8

== Bobsleigh ==
Bobsleigh events took place at Kunsteis-Bob-und Rodelbahn in Igls from 31 January to 7 February. The course had a length of 1.506 km (0.936 mi) and the start was located at an altitude of 1,133 m (3,717 ft). The country sent teams to compete in the two men and four men events.

Men

Sled	Athletes	Event	Run 1		Run 2		Run 3		Run 4		Total	
Sled	Athletes	Event	Time	Rank	Time	Rank	Time	Rank	Time	Rank	Time	Rank
BEL-1	Jean-Marie Buisset; Claude Englebert	Twos	1:09.53	20	1:10.01	20	DNF	–	–	–	DNF	–

Sled	Athletes	Event	Run 1		Run 2		Run 3		Run 4		Total	
Sled	Athletes	Event	Time	Rank	Time	Rank	Time	Rank	Time	Rank	Time	Rank
BEL-1	Jean de Crawhez; Thierry De Borchgrave; Charly Bouvy; Camille Liénard; Jean-Marie Buisset	Fours	1:07.46	18	1:05.56	17	1:06.51	16	1:06.31	15	4:25.84	17

== Speed skating ==
Speed skating events took place at Eisschnellaufbahn im Olympiaeisstadion in Innsbruck on 4 February. François Brueren was the lone participant and finished 33rd in the men's 500m event.

Men

Athlete	Event	Race	
Athlete	Event	Time	Rank
François Brueren	500 m	43.4	33
