= Katrien Pauwels =

Belgian former competitive figure skater (born 1965)

Personal information
- Born: 8 November 1965 (age 60) Ghent, Belgium
- Height: 1.65 m (5 ft 5 in)

Figure skating career
- Country: Belgium
- Retired: 1988

Katrien Pauwels (born 8 November 1965) is a Belgian former competitive figure skater. Pauwels represented Belgium at the 1984 and 1988 Winter Olympics, and she was Belgium's flag bearer in 1988. She was a nine-time Belgian champion.

== Early life ==
Pauwels was born in Ghent and grew up in Mariakerke. Her mother was a fan of figure skating, and Pauwels watched competitions on television with her, which led her to begin skating herself.

Pauwels had three brothers. All three had Duchenne muscular dystrophy and were cared for in the 1970s at a hospital in Oostduinkerke, where she often visited them, before they died. Both her parents also died soon afterward.

== Career ==
Pauwels won the Belgian Figure Skating Championships nine times; she won her first national title at 11 years old.

In 1982, Pauwels competed for the first time at both the European Championships, where she placed 21st, and the World Championships, where she finished 30th.

Pauwels competed at the 1984 Winter Olympics, where she finished in 16th place.

In 1985, Pauwels competed at Skate America, where she was in third after the short program after falling on the required double Lutz jump. She remained in third to win the bronze medal after the free skate, where she landed a triple Salchow jump. That season, she had her best placement (14th) at the World Championships.

Puawels competed at her second Olympics in 1988. She was the only athlete at the Olympics from Belgium and so also acted as the flag bearer. Pauwels recalled it as a "special experience" and said that she was often asked how big her country's team was by other athletes, to which she would reply, "I am the team." She placed 17th.

== Personal life ==
Pauwels moved to Wondelgem. She works as a medical representative and also coaches figure skating in Eeklo. She has two daughters, Aurélie and Charlotte, who also skate.

In 2009, Pauwels appeared on Dancing on Ice (Netherlands and Belgium) as a member of the jury.

== Competitive highlights ==
International
Event	81–82	82–83	83–84	84–85	85–86	86–87	87–88
Winter Olympics			16th				17th
World Championships	30th	15th	15th	WD	14th		
European Championships	21st	15th	13th	16th			14th
Skate America					3rd		
Golden Spin of Zagreb		3rd					3rd
Karl Schäfer Memorial							3rd
St. Gervais			1st				
National
Belgian Championships	1st		1st	1st	1st	1st	
