= Belgium at the 2010 Winter Olympics =

- IOC code: BEL
- NOC: Belgian Olympic and Interfederal Committee
- Website: www.teambelgium.be (in Dutch and French)

in Vancouver
- Competitors: 8 in 4 sports
- Flag bearer (opening): Kevin van der Perren
- Flag bearer (closing): Pieter Gysel
- Medals: Gold 0 Silver 0 Bronze 0 Total 0

Winter Olympics appearances (overview)
- 1924; 1928; 1932; 1936; 1948; 1952; 1956; 1960; 1964; 1968; 1972; 1976; 1980; 1984; 1988; 1992; 1994; 1998; 2002; 2006; 2010; 2014; 2018; 2022; 2026

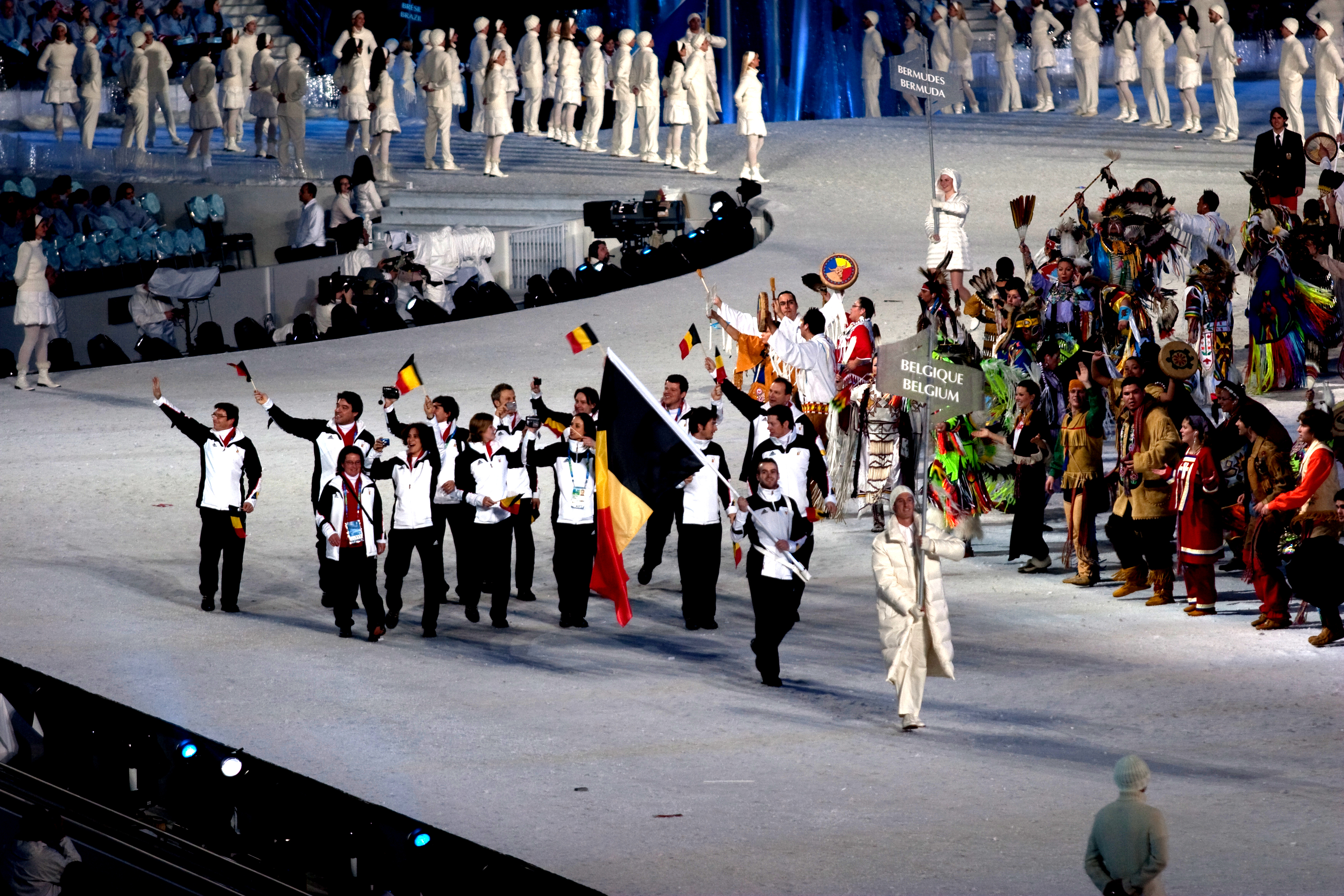
The athletes entering the stadium during the opening ceremonies.

Belgium sent a delegation to compete at the 2010 Winter Olympics in Vancouver, British Columbia, Canada from 12–28 February 2010. The nation has been to every Winter Olympics except two, both in the 1960s. The Belgian delegation to Vancouver consisted of eight athletes, competing in four different sports. The delegation did not win any medals, and their best performance in any event was ninth by Pieter Gysel in the short track speed skating 1,500 meters event.

== Background ==
Belgium has been participating in the Olympic movement almost since the beginning, with their first appearance coming at the 1900 Summer Olympics in Paris. They have competed in every Winter Olympic Games except for the 1960 and 1968 editions. Coming into Vancouver they had won five medals in Winter Olympic competition, but none since the 1998 Winter Olympics. Belgium qualified eight athletes into the Vancouver Olympics: three in alpine skiing, two in bobsleigh, two in figure skating, and one in short track speed skating. This was Belgium's first time fielding women in bobsleigh competition, Eva Willemarck and Elfje Willemsen were entered in the two-woman race. Figure skater Kevin van der Perren was chosen as the flag bearer for the opening ceremony, his second time doing so. Short-track racer Pieter Gysel was selected as the flag bearer for the closing ceremony.

== Alpine skiing ==
Belgium qualified three athletes in alpine skiing. Karen Persyn was 26 years old at the time of her race in Vancouver, the women's slalom, which was held on 26 February. She was making her first Olympic appearance. She posted run times of 54.09 seconds and 53.87 seconds. Her combined time of 1 minute and 47.96 seconds was good enough to put her in 27th place, out of 55 women who finished both runs of the race. Bart Mollin and Jeroen Van den Bogaert each contested only one event, the men's slalom on 27 February. Mollin was 28 years old at the time, while Van den Bogaert was 30 years old. Both men were making their debut Olympic appearance. Mollin failed to finish the first run of the race, while Van den Bogaert posted a time of 53.99 seconds. In the second run, Van den Bogaert posted a time of 54.57 seconds, making his combined time for the race 1 minute and 48.56 seconds, which put him in 34th place out of 48 competitors who finished the race.

Athlete	Event	Run 1	Run 2	Total	Rank
Bart Mollin	Men's slalom	DNF	did not advance		
Jeroen Van den Bogaert	Men's slalom	53.99	54.57	1:48.56	34
Karen Persyn	Women's slalom	54.09	53.87	1:47.96	27

== Bobsleigh ==
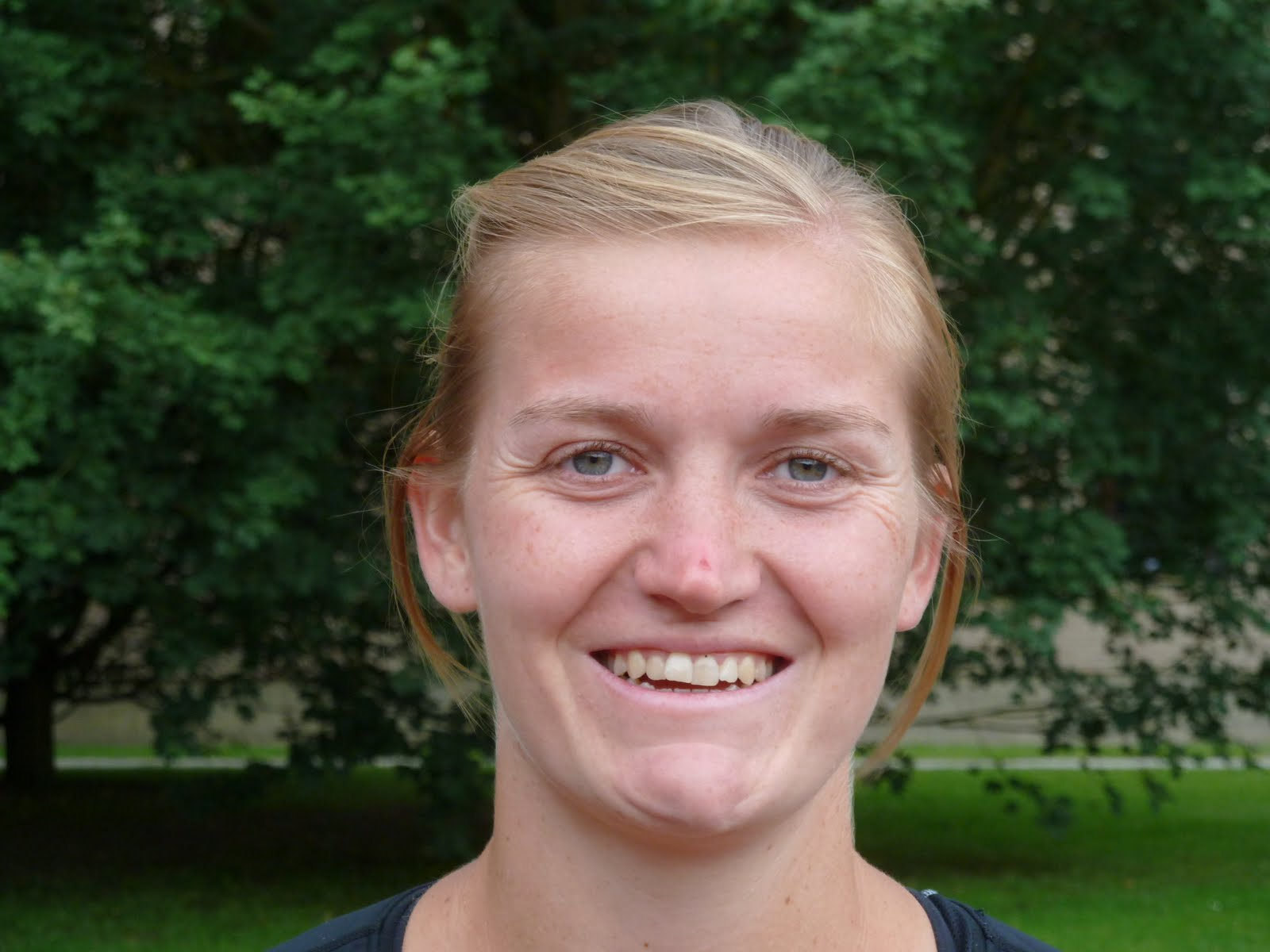
Elfje Willemsen made her Olympic debut in Vancouver.

Belgium qualified one women's bobsleigh team. The two competitors, Eva Willemarck and Elfje Willemsen, were each 25 years old at the time of the Vancouver Olympics. Both were making their Olympic debuts, and Willemsen would again compete for Belgium at the 2014 Winter Olympics. The two-woman competition was held on 23–24 February, with two runs being contested each day. Belgium's sleigh posted times of 54.27 seconds, and 54.40 seconds on the first day. Of the 21 teams competing, Belgium finished the first day in 15th place. On the second day, Willemarck and Willemsen posted times of 54.64 seconds, and 54.17 seconds. Their final time was 3 minutes, 37.48 seconds, which placed the Belgians in 14th position for the overall competition.

Athlete	Event	Final					
Athlete	Event	Run 1	Run 2	Run 3	Run 4	Total	Rank
Eva Willemarck; Elfje Willemsen	Two-woman	54.27	54.40	54.64	54.17	3:37.48	14

== Figure skating ==
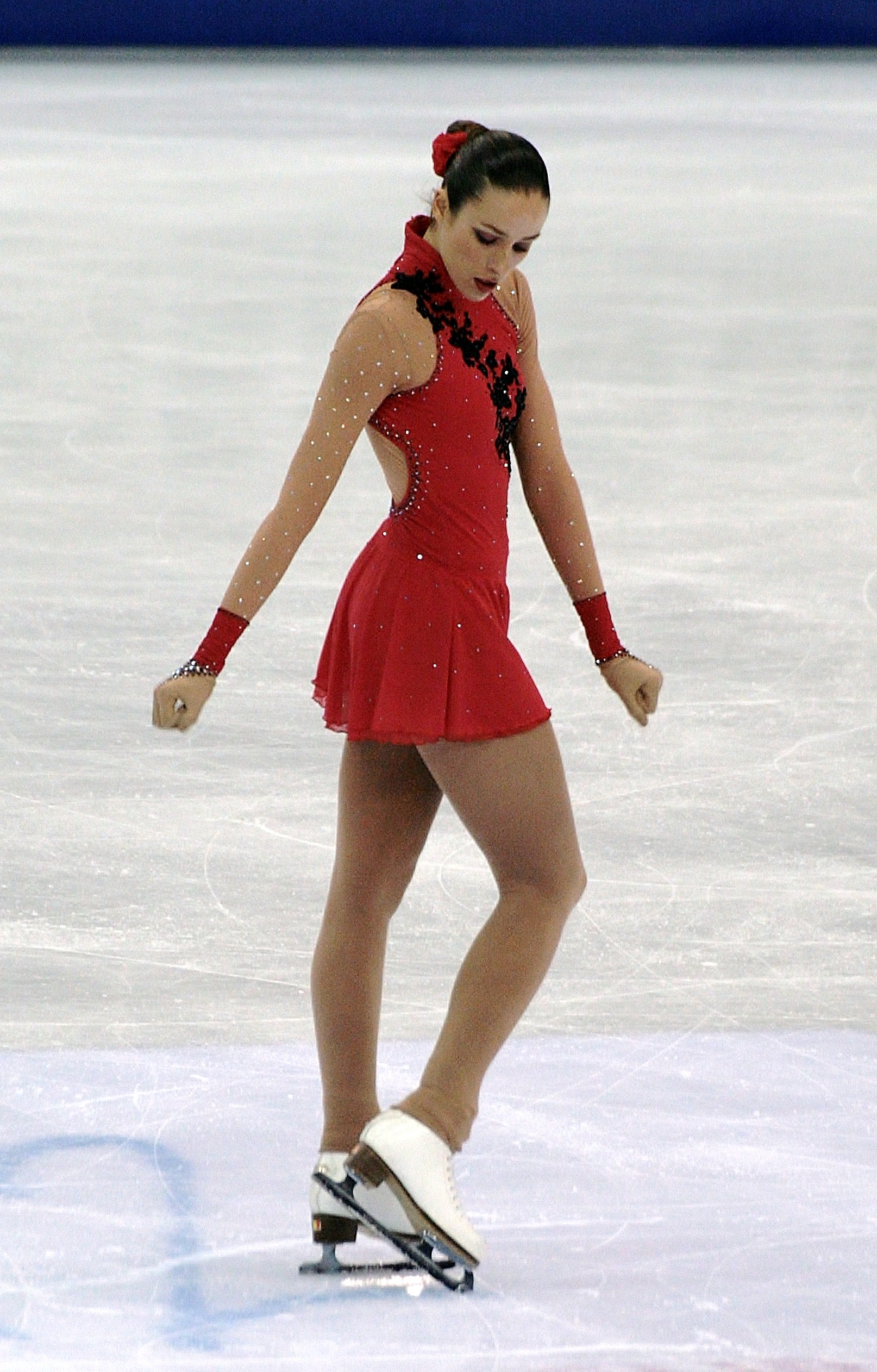
Isabelle Pieman at the 2012 World Figure Skating Championships

These Olympics were Kevin van der Perren's third Olympic Games. His best finish was ninth at the 2006 Winter Games. He entered these Olympics with the goal of a top five finish. Van der Perren performed the short program in a skeleton costume. He thought it was his best short program he had ever performed, and expected to score higher than his personal best of 75.80 points. He scored 72.90 points, which put him in 12th place.

Twice during the free skate, he had to balance himself with a hand on the ice after his jump. Since he was nervous, he simplified his jumps for the middle of the program. During the free skate he placed 18th with 116.94 points. He finished with 189.84 total points, finishing in 17th place overall.

Isabelle Pieman met the criteria for the Olympics in 2009, but the Belgian Olympic and Interfederal Committee delayed in selecting her for her first Olympic Games. She needed to finish in the top 24 to advance to the free skate. She set a new personal record during the short program, scoring 46.30 points. Pieman placed 25th, and did not advance to the free skating segment. She was happy with her finish, saying, "This was the best short freestyle in my career and I am very happy to have just been able to show that in Vancouver."

Athlete(s)	Event	SP/OD		FS/FD		Total	
Athlete(s)	Event	Points	Rank	Points	Rank	Points	Rank
Kevin van der Perren	Men	72.90	12	116.94	18	189.84	17
Isabelle Pieman	Ladies	46.10	25	did not advance			25

== Short track speed skating ==
Pieter Gysel competed in three short track speed skating events: the 500 meter, the 1,000 meter, and the 1,500 meter. This was his third Winter Olympics; he raced in the 2002 Olympics in Salt Lake City and the 2006 Olympics in Turin.

Gysel hoped to finish in the top six of the 1,500 meter race, and thought he might medal. There are six athletes per heat in the 1,500 meter, with the top three in each heat advancing to the next round. He finished with the 21st best time in the first round, finishing in 2:18.560. Gysel was second in his heat, behind Apolo Ohno, and advanced to the semifinals. In the semifinals, there were seven athletes per heat, with the top two advancing to the A Final and the next two advancing to the B Final. Gysel was passed near the end of the race and finished fourth in his heat with a time of 2:16.249. This placed him in the B finals, and the best he could finish was seventh place. He finished third in his finals heat with a time of 2:18.773, which placed him ninth overall in the 1500 meter race.

He drew a tough matchup in the 1,000 meter race: Sochi 1,500 meter gold medalist Lee Jung-Su and bronze medalist J.R. Celski. He was in second place for most of the race, which would have advanced him to the quarterfinals. Towards the end of the race, he lost some speed coming out of a turn and was passed by Celski. Gysel was eliminated in the first round after finishing in 19th place, with a time of 1:25.113. Even though he had the seventh best time, he placed third in his heat and was eliminated from competition.

Gysel came to the Olympics with the ambition to finish in the top eight in the 500 meter race. He finished second in his heat that featured two strong competitors: vice world champion Kwak Yoon-gy and Jordan Malone. Malone was considered one of the best in the world for this event. Gysel was in third place during the final lap when Malone crashed. Gysel overtook him and finished second in the heat, with a time of 42.443 seconds. He advanced to the quarterfinals with the slowest time of those that advanced. Gysel drew a difficult quarterfinal matchup, which featured the 2006 silver medalist, Canadian François-Louis Tremblay, and another round against Kwak. He was eliminated from the event in the quarterfinals. He placed last out of the four competitors; he needed to finish in the top two in order to advance to the semifinals.

Key
- Q = Qualified for the next round
- QB = Qualified for B Final

Athlete	Event	Heat		Quarterfinal		Semifinal		Final	
Athlete	Event	Time	Rank	Time	Rank	Time	Rank	Time	Rank
Pieter Gysel	500m	42.443	22 Q	41.980	12	did not advance			
Pieter Gysel	1000m	1:25.613	19	did not advance					
Pieter Gysel	1500m	2:18.560	21 Q			2:16.249	16 QB	2:18.773	9

== See also ==
- Belgium at the 2010 Winter Paralympics
