= Karen Persyn =

Belgian alpine skier (born 1983)

Karen Persyn (born 31 March 1983) is an alpine skier from Belgium. She competed for Belgium at the 2010 Winter Olympics. She finished in 27th place in the slalom, her only event of the competition.

She won her first FIS slalom at Diavolezza, Switzerland on 15 November 2011.
