= Sky Remans =

Belgian snowboarder (born 2010)

Personal information
- Nationality: Belgian
- Born: 13 October 2010 (age 15)
- Home town: Bree, Belgium

Sport
- Country: Belgium
- Sport: Snowboarding
- Events: Slopestyle, Big air
Medal record
Snowboarding
Representing Belgium
Junior World Championships
Gold medal – first place	2026 Calgary	Big Air

Sky Remans (born 13 October 2010) is a Belgian snowboarder.

== Biography ==
Remans picked up snowboarding when she was five on vacation with her parents. Seeing how much she liked it, her parents entered her in the Kidsweek Freestyle Snowboard in Snow Valley Peer, Belgium where she caught the eye of trainers and talent scouts. When she was five and a halve years old, she joined Snow Valley Peer's freestyle team. Early 2020 she became a member of the Intensive Rookie Program of Snowsports Flanders and in 2024 she joined Belgian Olympic and Interfederal Committee's Be Gold program.

In 2023, at the age of twelve, Remans was invited by snowboarding legend and double Olympic champion Anna Gasser to attend the second Future Queens session Red Bull development camp.

== Career ==
In winter season 2024/25, in only her second season of international competition, Remans took the top spot on the women's 2024/25 European Cup in Slopestyle & Big air, locking down a victory and a runner-up finish in both Big air and Slopestyle.

Aged fifteen, Remans made her debut on the FIS Snowboard World Cup in winter season 2025/26. She finished twelfth and fourteenth in her two first Big air World Cup events in Secret Garden and Beijing, China.

After having finished eleventh in her very first start in a Slopestyle event on the World Cup circuit in Aspen, Colorado, she reached her first World Cup final finishing fifth in her second outing in a Slopestyle event in Laax, Switzerland.

The latter result brought her just enough points to qualify for the 2026 Winter Olympics in Milan and Cortina d'Ampezzo where she was the youngest participant of the tournament. Having disappointed at the 2026 Winter Olympics, finishing 27th resp. 30th and last in the women's big air and slopestyle competitions, Remans less than a month later won the gold medal at the women's Big air at the FIS Park and Pipe Junior World Championships in Calgary, Canada.
