= Charles de Ligne =

Charles de Ligne may refer to:

- Charles de Ligne, 2nd Prince of Arenberg (1550–1616)
- Charles de Ligne (speed skater) (1895–1944), Belgian speed skater
- Charles-Joseph, 7th Prince of Ligne (1735–1814)
