= Belgium at the 1992 Winter Olympics =

- IOC code: BEL
- NOC: Belgian Olympic and Interfederal Committee

in Albertville
- Competitors: 5 (4 men, 1 woman) in 1 sport
- Flag bearer: Geert Blanchart (short track speed skating)
- Medals: Gold 0 Silver 0 Bronze 0 Total 0

Winter Olympics appearances (overview)
- 1924; 1928; 1932; 1936; 1948; 1952; 1956; 1960; 1964; 1968; 1972; 1976; 1980; 1984; 1988; 1992; 1994; 1998; 2002; 2006; 2010; 2014; 2018; 2022; 2026

Belgium competed at the 1992 Winter Olympics in Albertville, France.

== Competitors ==
The following is the list of number of competitors in the Games.

Sport	Men	Women	Total
Short track speed skating	4	1	5
Total	4	1	5

== Short track speed skating ==
Men

Athlete	Event	Round one		Quarter finals		Semi finals		Finals	
Athlete	Event	Time	Rank	Time	Rank	Time	Rank	Time	Final rank
Geert Blanchart	1000 m	1:38.66	1 Q	1:34.83	2 Q	1:33.04	4 QB	1:36.28	6
Alain De Ruyter	1000 m	1:34.18	2 Q	1:34.60	4	did not advance			
Geert Blanchart; Alain De Ruyter; Geert De Jonghe; Franky Vanhooren	5000 m relay			8:32.51	3	did not advance			

Women

Athlete	Event	Round one		Quarter finals		Semi finals		Finals	
Athlete	Event	Time	Rank	Time	Rank	Time	Rank	Time	Final rank
Bea Pintens	500 m	48.98	2 Q	48.49	4	did not advance			
