= Belgium at the 1994 Winter Olympics =

- IOC code: BEL
- NOC: Belgian Olympic and Interfederal Committee
- Website: www.teambelgium.be (in Dutch and French)

in Lillehammer
- Competitors: 5 in 2 sports
- Flag bearer: Bea Pintens
- Medals: Gold 0 Silver 0 Bronze 0 Total 0

Winter Olympics appearances (overview)
- 1924; 1928; 1932; 1936; 1948; 1952; 1956; 1960; 1964; 1968; 1972; 1976; 1980; 1984; 1988; 1992; 1994; 1998; 2002; 2006; 2010; 2014; 2018; 2022; 2026

Belgium competed at the 1994 Winter Olympics in Lillehammer, Norway.

== Competitors ==
The following is the list of number of competitors in the Games.

Sport	Men	Women	Total
Alpine skiing	0	1	1
Short track speed skating	2	2	4
Total	2	3	5

== Results by event ==
=== Alpine skiing ===
Women

Athlete	Event	Final				
Athlete	Event	Run 1	Run 2	Run 3	Total	Rank
Véronique Dugailly	Downhill				DNF	
Véronique Dugailly	Combined	1:37.22	1:02.97	57.90	3:38.09	23

=== Short track speed skating ===
Men

Athlete	Event	Heats		Quarterfinals		Semifinals		Final	
Athlete	Event	Time	Rank	Time	Rank	Time	Rank	Time	Rank
Geert Blanchart	1000 metres	DQ		Ranking Round					31st
Stephan Huygen	500 metres	45.04	4th	Ranking Round					26th

Women

Athlete	Event	Heats		Quarterfinals		Semifinals		Final	
Athlete	Event	Time	Rank	Time	Rank	Time	Rank	Time	Rank
Bea Pintens	500 metres	49.59	4th	Ranking Round					27th
Bea Pintens	1000 metres	1:43.16	3rd	Ranking Round					19th
Sofie Pintens	500 metres	DQ		Ranking Round					30th
Sofie Pintens	1000 metres	1:41.12	3rd	Ranking Round					17th

== Sources ==
- Official Olympic Reports
