= Belgium at the 2018 Winter Olympics =

- Flag of Belgium
- IOC code: BEL
- NOC: Belgian Olympic and Interfederal Committee
- Website: www.teambelgium.be (in Dutch and French)

in Pyeongchang, South Korea 9–25 February 2018
- Competitors: 22 (13 men and 9 women) in 9 sports
- Flag bearer: Seppe Smits
- Medals Ranked 25th: Gold 0 Silver 1 Bronze 0 Total 1

Winter Olympics appearances (overview)
- 1924; 1928; 1932; 1936; 1948; 1952; 1956; 1960; 1964; 1968; 1972; 1976; 1980; 1984; 1988; 1992; 1994; 1998; 2002; 2006; 2010; 2014; 2018; 2022; 2026

Belgium competed at the 2018 Winter Olympics in Pyeongchang, South Korea, from 9 to 25 February 2018, with 22 competitors in 9 sports. They won one silver medal, the country's first Winter Olympic medal since 1998, ranking 25th in the medal table.

== Medalists ==
Medal	Name	Sport	Event	Date
Silver	Bart Swings	Speed skating	Men's mass start	February 24

== Competitors ==
The following is the list of number of competitors participating in the Belgian delegation per sport.

Sport	Men	Women	Total
Alpine skiing	2	2	4
Biathlon	2	0	2
Bobsleigh	0	4	4
Cross-country skiing	1	0	1
Figure skating	1	1	2
Short track speed skating	2	0	2
Skeleton	0	1	1
Snowboarding	3	0	3
Speed skating	2	1	3
Total	13	9	22

== Alpine skiing ==
Belgium qualified two male and two female alpine skiers, Kai Alaerts, Marjolein Decroix, Sam Maes and Kim Vanreusel.

Athlete	Event	Run 1		Run 2		Total	
Athlete	Event	Time	Rank	Time	Rank	Time	Rank
Kai Alaerts	Men's slalom	DNF					
Sam Maes	Men's giant slalom	1:13.29	38	1:12.91	31	2:26.20	32
Sam Maes	Men's slalom	52.90	37	DNF			
Marjolein Decroix	Women's slalom	55.91	45	54.80	36	1:50.71	38
Kim Vanreusel	Women's downhill	—N/a				1:46.51	30
Kim Vanreusel	Women's super-G	—N/a				1:27.60	40
Kim Vanreusel	Women's giant slalom	1:17.60	41	1:14.92	39	2:32.52	39
Kim Vanreusel	Women's slalom	55.90	44	55.96	41	1:51.86	40
Kim Vanreusel	Women's combined	DNF		—N/a			

== Biathlon ==
Belgium qualified two male biathletes, signifying the nation's Olympic debut in the sport.

Athlete	Event	Time	Misses	Rank
Florent Claude	Men's sprint	25:43.7	3 (1+2)	55
Florent Claude	Men's pursuit	39:22.7	4 (1+1+1+1)	57
Florent Claude	Men's individual	53:03.2	2 (0+0+0+2)	54
Michael Rösch	Men's sprint	25:09.4	2 (0+2)	38
Michael Rösch	Men's pursuit	35:55.1	1 (0+0+0+1)	23
Michael Rösch	Men's individual	55:10.1	5 (0+3+0+2)	75

== Bobsleigh ==
Belgium qualified two teams for the women's bobsleigh competition.

Athlete	Event	Run 1		Run 2		Run 3		Run 4		Total	
Athlete	Event	Time	Rank	Time	Rank	Time	Rank	Time	Rank	Time	Rank
An Vannieuwenhuyse*; Sophie Vercruyssen	Two-woman	51.24	14	51.28	14	51.53	17	51.20	8	3:25.25	12
Sara Aerts; Elfje Willemsen*	Two-woman	51.03	10	51.27	13	51.10	10	51.21	9	3:24.61	11

* – Denotes the driver of each sled

== Cross-country skiing ==
Belgium qualified one male skier, Thierry Langer, signifying the nation's Olympic debut in the sport.

Distance

Athlete	Event	Final		
Athlete	Event	Time	Deficit	Rank
Thierry Langer	Men's 15 km freestyle	37:45.0	4:01.1	66

== Figure skating ==
Belgium qualified one female figure skater, based on its placement at the 2017 World Figure Skating Championships in Helsinki, Finland. They additionally qualified one male figure skater through the 2017 CS Nebelhorn Trophy. The team was announced on 15 December 2017.

Athlete	Event	SP		FS		Total	
Athlete	Event	Points	Rank	Points	Rank	Points	Rank
Jorik Hendrickx	Men's singles	84.74	11 Q	164.21	16	248.95	14
Loena Hendrickx	Ladies' singles	55.16	20 Q	116.72	14	171.88	16

== Short track speed skating ==
Belgium qualified two skaters for men's 1500 m event for the Olympics during the four World Cup events in November 2017. The team was officially announced on 26 December 2017 by the Belgian Olympic Committee.

Athlete	Event	Heat		Semifinal		Final	
Athlete	Event	Time	Rank	Time	Rank	Time	Rank
Jens Almey	Men's 1500 m	2:12.998	2 Q	—	6	did not advance	
Ward Pétré	Men's 1500 m	2:17.362	5	did not advance			

== Skeleton ==
Belgium qualified one female skeleton athlete. This will mark the country's Winter Olympics debut in the sport.

Athlete	Event	Run 1		Run 2		Run 3		Run 4		Total	
Athlete	Event	Time	Rank	Time	Rank	Time	Rank	Time	Rank	Time	Rank
Kim Meylemans	Women's	52.56	16	52.54	14	52.34	13	52.26	11	3:29.70	14

== Snowboarding ==
Belgium qualified three male snowboarders, Sebbe De Buck, Seppe Smits and Stef Vandeweyer.

Freestyle

Athlete	Event	Qualification				Final				
Athlete	Event	Run 1	Run 2	Best	Rank	Run 1	Run 2	Run 3	Best	Rank
Sebbe De Buck	Men's big air	33.50	17	30.25	18	did not advance				
Sebbe De Buck	Men's slopestyle	59.40	29.58	59.40	12	did not advance				
Seppe Smits	Men's big air	50.00	13	59.25	15	did not advance				
Seppe Smits	Men's slopestyle	78.36	41.48	78.36	6 Q	31.11	69.03	66.18	69.03	10
Stef Vandeweyer	Men's big air	61.00	12	29.50	14	did not advance				
Stef Vandeweyer	Men's slopestyle	33.75	21.16	33.75	17	did not advance				

== Speed skating ==
Belgium earned the following quotas at the conclusion of the four World Cup's used for qualification. The team was officially announced on 26 December 2017 by the Belgian Olympic Committee. Belgium later earned an additional quota for Mathias Vosté after the approval of the Olympic Athletes from Russia team allowed for reallocations.

Individual

Athlete	Event	Race	
Athlete	Event	Time	Rank
Bart Swings	Men's 1500 m	1:45.49	6
Bart Swings	Men's 5000 m	6:14.57	6
Bart Swings	Men's 10000 m	13:03.53	8
Mathias Vosté	Men's 500 m	35.546	32
Mathias Vosté	Men's 1000 m	1:11.24	35
Mathias Vosté	Men's 1500 m	1:47.34	23
Jelena Peeters	Women's 5000 m	7:10.26	10

Mass start

Athlete	Event	Semifinal			Final		
Athlete	Event	Points	Time	Rank	Points	Time	Rank
Bart Swings	Men's mass start	5	8:13.57	5 Q	40	7:44.08	2nd place, silver medalist(s)
