= Belgium at the 2002 Winter Olympics =

- IOC code: BEL
- NOC: Belgian Olympic and Interfederal Committee
- Website: www.teambelgium.be (in Dutch and French)

in Salt Lake City
- Competitors: 6 (6 men, 0 women) in 3 sports
- Flag bearer: Simon Van Vossel
- Medals: Gold 0 Silver 0 Bronze 0 Total 0

Winter Olympics appearances (overview)
- 1924; 1928; 1932; 1936; 1948; 1952; 1956; 1960; 1964; 1968; 1972; 1976; 1980; 1984; 1988; 1992; 1994; 1998; 2002; 2006; 2010; 2014; 2018; 2022; 2026

Belgium competed at the 2002 Winter Olympics in Salt Lake City, United States.

== Figure skating ==
Athlete(s)	Event	SP	FS	Total	
Athlete(s)	Event	Rank	Rank	Points	Rank
Kevin van der Perren	Men	13	13	19.5	12

== Short track speed skating ==
Athlete	Event	Heat		Quarterfinal		Semifinal		Final	
Athlete	Event	Time	Rank	Time	Rank	Time	Rank	Time	Rank
Wim De Deyne	500m	43.205	8 Q	41.832	2 Q	42.823	6 QB	42.961	7
Wim De Deyne	1000m	1:30.950	9 Q	1:27.785	11	did not advance			
Simon Van Vossel	500m	43.119	7 Q	DSQ					16
Simon Van Vossel	1500m			DSQ					
Pieter Gysel	1000m	1:31.290	21	did not advance					
Pieter Gysel	1500m			2:24.161	22	did not advance			
Wim De Deyne; Pieter Gysel; Ward Janssens; Simon Van Vossel	5000m relay					6:56.389	6 QB	DSQ	

== Speed skating ==
Athlete	Event	Final	
Athlete	Event	Time	Rank
Bart Veldkamp	Men's 5000 m	6:25.88	8
Bart Veldkamp	Men's 10000 m	13:37.48	9
