= Belgium at the 2006 Winter Olympics =

- IOC code: BEL
- NOC: Belgian Olympic and Interfederal Committee
- Website: www.teambelgium.be (in Dutch and French)

in Turin
- Competitors: 4 (4 men) in 3 sports
- Flag bearers: Kevin van der Perren (opening); Bart Veldkamp (closing)
- Medals: Gold 0 Silver 0 Bronze 0 Total 0

Winter Olympics appearances (overview)
- 1924; 1928; 1932; 1936; 1948; 1952; 1956; 1960; 1964; 1968; 1972; 1976; 1980; 1984; 1988; 1992; 1994; 1998; 2002; 2006; 2010; 2014; 2018; 2022; 2026

Belgium sent four athletes to compete at the 2006 Winter Olympics in Turin, Italy.

== Figure skating ==
Athlete	Event	Short Program		Free Skate		Total	
Athlete	Event	Points	Rank	Points	Rank	Points	Rank
Kevin van der Perren	Men's	65.36	13 Q	132.03	8	197.39	9

== Short track speed skating ==
Athlete	Event	Heat		Quarterfinal		Semifinal		Final	
Athlete	Event	Time	Rank	Time	Rank	Time	Rank	Time	Rank
Wim de Deyne	Men's 500 m	42.883	9 Q	42.979	12	did not advance			
Wim de Deyne	Men's 1500 m	disqualified							
Pieter Gysel	Men's 500 m	42.980	17	did not advance					
Pieter Gysel	Men's 1000 m	1:27.994	9 Q	1:28.335	6 Q	disqualified			
Pieter Gysel	Men's 1500 m	2:23.411	5 Q	disqualified					17

Key: 'ADV' indicates a skater was advanced due to being interfered with.

== Speed skating ==
Athlete	Event	Race 1		Final	
Athlete	Event	Time	Rank	Time	Rank
Bart Veldkamp	Men's 5000 m	n/a		6:32.02	13
Bart Veldkamp	Men's 10000 m	n/a		13:48.12	14
