= Joseph Lekens =

Belgian ice hockey player

Personal information
- Nationality: Belgian
- Born: 22 April 1911; Antwerp, Belgium
- Died: 13 September 1973 (aged 62); Antwerp, Belgium

Sport
- Sport: Ice hockey
- Position: Forward / Defenceman

Joseph Adam Eugene Lekens (22 April 1911 – 13 September 1973) was a Belgian ice hockey player. He competed in the men's tournament at the 1936 Winter Olympics.
