= Belgium at the 1928 Winter Olympics =

- IOC code: BEL
- NOC: Belgian Olympic Committee

in St. Moritz
- Competitors: 25 (24 men, 1 woman) in 3 sports
- Medals Ranked 8th: Gold 0 Silver 0 Bronze 1 Total 1

Winter Olympics appearances (overview)
- 1924; 1928; 1932; 1936; 1948; 1952; 1956; 1960; 1964; 1968; 1972; 1976; 1980; 1984; 1988; 1992; 1994; 1998; 2002; 2006; 2010; 2014; 2018; 2022; 2026

Belgium competed at the 1928 Winter Olympics in St. Moritz, Switzerland.

== Medalists ==
Medal	Name	Sport	Event
Bronze	Robert van Zeebroeck	Figure skating	Men's singles

== Bobsleigh ==
Sled	Athletes	Event	Run 1		Run 2		Total	
Sled	Athletes	Event	Time	Rank	Time	Rank	Time	Rank
BEL-1	Ernest Lambert; Walter Ganshof; Marcel Sedille-Courbon; Max Houben; Léon Tom	Five-man	1:39.8	2	1:44.7	12	3:24.5	6
BEL-2	Charles Mulder; Hubert Kryn; Ferdinand Hubert; Louis Rooy; Robert Langlois	Five-man	1:45.0	17	1:46.2	16	3:31.2	16

== Figure skating ==
Men

Athlete	Event	CF	FS	Places	Points	Final rank
Robert van Zeebroeck	Men's singles	3	3	27	1542.75	3rd place, bronze medalist(s)

Pairs

Athletes	Points	Score	Final rank
Josy van Leberghe; Robert van Zeebroeck	54	83.00	6

== Ice hockey ==
=== Group A ===
The top team (highlighted) advanced to the medal round.

Team	GP	W	L	GF	GA
Great Britain	3	2	1	10	6
France	3	2	1	6	5
Belgium	3	2	1	9	10
Hungary	3	0	3	2	6

February 11	Great Britain	7:3 (3:1,2:0,2:2)	Belgium
February 12	Belgium	3:2 (0:1,3:1,0:0)	Hungary
February 13	Belgium	3:1 (2:0,0:0,1:1)	France

—	Belgium
	André Bautier; Roger Bureau; Hector Chotteau; Albert Collon; François Franck; Guillaume Hoorickx; Jean Meens; David Meyer; Mark Pelzer; Jan Van der Wouwer; Jacques Van Reysschoot; Pierre Van Reysschoot
