= Jean Massez =

Belgian speed skater (born 1925)

Personal information
- Nationality: Belgian
- Born: 15 April 1925

Sport
- Sport: Speed skating

Jean Massez (born 15 April 1925) was a Belgian former speed skater. He competed in two events at the 1952 Winter Olympics.
