= Gaston Braun =

Belgian bobsledder

Gaston Braun (1 September 1903 – 1 January 1990) was a Belgian bobsledder who competed in the 1930s. He finished eighth in the four-man event at the 1936 Winter Olympics in Garmisch-Partenkirchen.
