= Gilbert Van Eesbeeck =

Belgian speed skater

Personal information
- Nationality: Belgian
- Born: 14 October 1952 (age 72)

Sport
- Sport: Speed skating

Gilbert Van Eesbeeck (born 14 October 1952) is a Belgian speed skater. He competed in two events at the 1976 Winter Olympics.
