= Henri Louette =

Belgian ice hockey player

- Born: 6 September 1900 Rance, Belgium
- Died: 9 January 1985 (aged 84) Pointe-Claire, Quebec, Canada
- Position: Centre
- National team: Belgium
- Playing career: 1922–1924

Henri Jules Célestin Louette (6 September 1900 – 9 January 1985) was a Belgian ice hockey player. He competed in the men's tournament at the 1924 Winter Olympics. Louette was born in Rance, Belgium, but grew up in Chambly-Vercheres, Quebec.
