= Philippe Van Volckxsom =

Belgian sportsperson

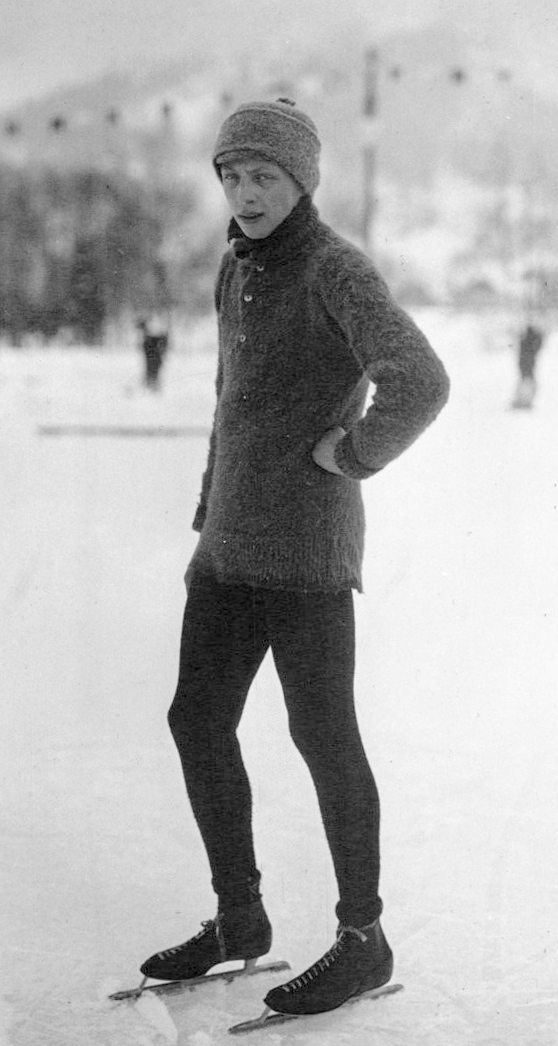
- Van Volckxsom in 1913

Personal information
- Born: 1 May 1897 Brussels, Belgium
- Died: 20 December 1938 (aged 41)

Sport
- Sport: Speed skating, ice hockey, rowing
- Club: CPB Brussels

Achievements and titles
- Personal best(s): 500 m – 56.4 (1924); 1500 m – 3:14.6 (1924)

Philippe Van Volckxsom (1 May 1897 – 20 December 1939) was a Belgian athlete who competed at the 1920 and 1928 Summer Olympics and at the first Winter Olympics in 1924. Recorded as being deployed as both a forward and a defenceman, he finished fifth and seventh with the Belgian ice hockey team in 1920 and 1924, respectively, and in 1924 he also took part in speed skating events. In 1928 he competed in rowing, together with the fellow ice hockey player Carlos Van den Driessche, but failed to reach the final of the coxless pairs event.

== See also ==
- List of athletes who competed in both the Summer and Winter Olympic games
