= Robert Baudinne =

Belgian ice hockey player

Personal information
- Nationality: Belgian
- Born: 10 June 1900 Schaerbeek, Belgium
- Died: 9 July 1962 (aged 62)

Sport
- Sport: Ice hockey

Robert Baudinne (10 June 1900 – 9 July 1962) was a Belgian ice hockey player. He competed in the men's tournament at the 1936 Winter Olympics.
