= Didier Xhaet =

Belgian alpine skier (born 1955)

Personal information
- Nationality: Belgian
- Born: 9 September 1955 (age 69)

Sport
- Sport: Alpine skiing

Didier Xhaet (born 9 September 1955) is a Belgian alpine skier. He competed in three events at the 1976 Winter Olympics.
