= Fréderic Rudolph =

Belgian ice hockey player

- Born: 27 August 1899; Belgium
- Position: Forward
- National team: Belgium
- Playing career: 1922–1924

Fréderic Louis Rudolph (born 27 August 1899, date of death unknown) was a Belgian ice hockey player. He competed in the men's tournament at the 1924 Winter Olympics.
