= Belgium at the 1988 Winter Olympics =

- IOC code: BEL
- NOC: Belgian Olympic and Interfederal Committee

in Calgary
- Competitors: 1 (woman) in 1 sport
- Flag bearer: Katrien Pauwels
- Medals: Gold 0 Silver 0 Bronze 0 Total 0

Winter Olympics appearances (overview)
- 1924; 1928; 1932; 1936; 1948; 1952; 1956; 1960; 1964; 1968; 1972; 1976; 1980; 1984; 1988; 1992; 1994; 1998; 2002; 2006; 2010; 2014; 2018; 2022; 2026

Belgium competed at the 1988 Winter Olympics in Calgary, Alberta, Canada.

== Competitors ==
The following is the list of number of competitors in the Games.

Sport	Men	Women	Total
Figure skating	0	1	1
Total	0	1	1

== Figure skating ==
Women

Athlete	CF	SP	FS	TFP	Rank
Katrien Pauwels	11	20	20	34.6	17
