= Robert Laboubée =

Belgian speed skater

Personal information
- Full name: Robert J. L. Laboubée
- Nationality: Belgian
- Born: 5 August 1927

Sport
- Sport: Speed skating

Robert Laboubée (born 5 August 1927) was a Belgian speed skater. He competed in two events at the 1952 Winter Olympics.
