= Belgium at the 1998 Winter Olympics =

- IOC code: BEL
- NOC: Belgian Olympic and Interfederal Committee
- Website: www.teambelgium.be (in Dutch and French)

in Nagano
- Competitors: 1 in 1 sport
- Flag bearer: Conrad Alleblas
- Medals Ranked 22nd: Gold 0 Silver 0 Bronze 1 Total 1

Winter Olympics appearances (overview)
- 1924; 1928; 1932; 1936; 1948; 1952; 1956; 1960; 1964; 1968; 1972; 1976; 1980; 1984; 1988; 1992; 1994; 1998; 2002; 2006; 2010; 2014; 2018; 2022; 2026

Belgium sent a delegation to compete at the 1998 Winter Olympics in Nagano, Japan from 7–22 February 1998. The nation was represented by only one athlete, speed skater Bart Veldkamp. He won a bronze medal in the men's 5,000 metres race. With that bronze medal, Belgium finished in joint 22nd place on the medal table.

== Background ==
Belgium has been participating in the Olympic movement almost since the beginning, with their first appearance coming at the 1900 Summer Olympics in Paris. They have competed in every Winter Olympic Games except for the 1960 and 1968 editions. Coming into Nagano, they had won four medals in Winter Olympic competition, but none since the 1948 Winter Olympics. The only Belgian representative to qualify for Nagano was speed skater Bart Veldkamp, who had previously won medals in the 10,000 metres race in both Albertville and Lillehammer. Due the fact that Veldkamp was scheduled to compete in the 5,000 meter event the following day, and was the only athlete from Belgium at the games, his coach Conrad Alleblas, was chosen as the flag bearer for the opening ceremony.

== Medalists ==
Medal	Name	Sport	Event	Date
Bronze	Bart Veldkamp	Speed skating	Men's 5000 m	February 8

With one bronze medal, Belgium ranked a joint 22nd in the medal table.

== Competitors ==
The following is the list of number of competitors in the Games.

Sport	Men	Women	Total
Speed skating	1	0	1
Total	1	0	1

== Speed skating ==
Bard Veldkamp was 30 years old at the time of the Nagano Olympics. Although Veldkamp was born in the Netherlands, he chose to take Belgian nationality in 1996 to make it easier to qualify for major competitions. Veldkamp had won gold for the Netherlands at the 1992 Winter Olympics and bronze for the Netherlands at the 1994 Winter Olympics, and would go on to represent Belgium at the 2002 Winter Olympics and the 2006 Winter Olympics. On 8 February, he took part in the 5,000 metres race. He went out early and set a new world record, only for two more world records to be set that day, leaving him in third place and the winner of the bronze medal. On 12 February, despite being a distance specialist, he participated in the 1,500 metres, and finished 17th with a time of 1 minute and 51.73 seconds. In the 10,000 metres, on 17 February, he skated in the final pairing, and finished fourth with a time of 13 minutes and 29 seconds, which was less than a second and a half behind the bronze medal time.

Event	Athlete	Race	
Event	Athlete	Time	Rank
1500 m	Bart Veldkamp	1:51.73	17
5000 m	Bart Veldkamp	6:28.31	3rd place, bronze medalist(s)
10,000 m	Bart Veldkamp	13:29.69	4
