= Didier Lamont =

Belgian alpine skier (born 1956)

Personal information
- Nationality: Belgian
- Born: 13 August 1956 (age 68)

Sport
- Sport: Alpine skiing

Didier Lamont (born 13 August 1956) is a Belgian alpine skier. He competed in three events at the 1980 Winter Olympics.
