= Walter Bastenie =

Belgian ice hockey player (1910–1965)

Personal information
- Nationality: Belgian
- Born: 29 May 1910; Antwerp, Belgium
- Died: January 24, 1965 (aged 54); Brussels, Belgium

Sport
- Sport: Ice hockey

Walter Bastenie (29 May 1910 – 24 January 1965) was a Belgian ice hockey player. He competed in the men's tournament at the 1936 Winter Olympics.
