= Belgium at the 1972 Winter Olympics =

- IOC code: BEL
- NOC: Belgian Olympic Committee

in Sapporo
- Competitors: 1 (man) in 1 sport
- Flag bearer: Robert Blanchaer
- Medals: Gold 0 Silver 0 Bronze 0 Total 0

Winter Olympics appearances (overview)
- 1924; 1928; 1932; 1936; 1948; 1952; 1956; 1960; 1964; 1968; 1972; 1976; 1980; 1984; 1988; 1992; 1994; 1998; 2002; 2006; 2010; 2014; 2018; 2022; 2026

Belgium competed at the 1972 Winter Olympics in Sapporo, Japan.

== Alpine skiing ==
Men

Athlete	Event	Race 1		Race 2		Total	
Athlete	Event	Time	Rank	Time	Rank	Time	Rank
Robert Blanchaer	Downhill					2:02.45	42
Robert Blanchaer	Giant Slalom	1:43.59	42	1:45.79	33	3:29.38	34

Men's slalom

Athlete	Classification		Final					
Athlete	Time	Rank	Time 1	Rank	Time 2	Rank	Total	Rank
Robert Blanchaer	DSQ	–	1:05.78	36	1:01.58	25	2:07.36	25

== Sources ==
- Official Olympic Reports
- Olympic Winter Games 1972, full results by sports-reference.com
