= Belgium at the 1932 Winter Olympics =

- IOC code: BEL
- NOC: Belgian Olympic Committee

in Lake Placid
- Competitors: 5 (4 men, 1 woman) in 2 sports
- Medals: Gold 0 Silver 0 Bronze 0 Total 0

Winter Olympics appearances (overview)
- 1924; 1928; 1932; 1936; 1948; 1952; 1956; 1960; 1964; 1968; 1972; 1976; 1980; 1984; 1988; 1992; 1994; 1998; 2002; 2006; 2010; 2014; 2018; 2022; 2026

Belgium competed at the 1932 Winter Olympics in Lake Placid, United States.

== Bobsleigh ==
Sled	Athletes	Event	Run 1		Run 2		Run 3		Run 4		Total	
Sled	Athletes	Event	Time	Rank	Time	Rank	Time	Rank	Time	Rank	Time	Rank
BEL-1	Max Houben; Louis van Hege	Two-man	2:17.68	9	2:14.90	9	2:10.90	8	2:09.62	9	8:53.10	9
BEL-2	Christian Hansez; Jacques Maus	Two-man	2:17.01	8	2:16.74	10	2:13.59	11	2:13.81	11	9:01.15	10

== Figure skating ==
Women

Athlete	Event	CF	FS	Places	Points	Final rank
Yvonne de Ligne	Women's singles	6	6	45	1942.5	6
