= Belgium at the 2022 Winter Olympics =

- Flag of Belgium
- IOC code: BEL
- NOC: Belgian Olympic and Interfederal Committee
- Website: www.teambelgium.be (in Dutch and French)

in Beijing, China 4–20 February 2022
- Competitors: 19 (11 men and 8 women) in 8 sports
- Flag bearers (opening): Loena Hendrickx; Armand Marchant
- Flag bearer (closing): Hanne Desmet
- Medals Ranked 21st: Gold 1 Silver 0 Bronze 1 Total 2

Winter Olympics appearances (overview)
- 1924; 1928; 1932; 1936; 1948; 1952; 1956; 1960; 1964; 1968; 1972; 1976; 1980; 1984; 1988; 1992; 1994; 1998; 2002; 2006; 2010; 2014; 2018; 2022; 2026

Belgium competed at the 2022 Winter Olympics in Beijing, China, from 4 to 20 February 2022.

The Belgian team consisted of 19 athletes (11 men and 8 women) competing in eight sports.

Loena Hendrickx and Armand Marchant were the country's flagbearers during the opening ceremony. Short track speed skater Hanne Desmet was the flagbearer during the closing ceremony.

== Medalists ==
The following Belgian competitors won medals at the games. In the discipline sections below, the medalists' names are bolded. On 19 February, Bart Swings, won Belgium's first Winter Olympic Gold medal since the 1948 Winter Olympics.

| Medal | Name | Sport | Event | Date |
|---|---|---|---|---|
| Gold | Bart Swings | Speed skating | Men's mass start | 19 February |
| Bronze | Hanne Desmet | Short track speed skating | Women's 1000 m | 11 February |

== Competitors ==
The following is a list of the number of competitors who participated at the Games per sport/discipline.

| Sport | Men | Women | Total |
|---|---|---|---|
| Alpine skiing | 3 | 0 | 3 |
| Biathlon | 4 | 1 | 5 |
| Bobsleigh | 0 | 2 | 2 |
| Cross-country skiing | 1 | 0 | 1 |
| Figure skating | 0 | 1 | 1 |
| Short track speed skating | 1 | 1 | 2 |
| Skeleton | 0 | 1 | 1 |
| Snowboarding | 0 | 1 | 1 |
| Speed skating | 2 | 1 | 3 |
| Total | 11 | 8 | 19 |

== Alpine skiing ==
Belgium qualified three male, and one female, alpine skiers.

| Athlete | Event | Run 1 | | Run 2 | | Total | |
| Athlete | Event | Time | Rank | Time | Rank | Time | Rank |
|---|---|---|---|---|---|---|---|
| Sam Maes | Men's giant slalom | DNF | | Did not advance | | | |
| Dries Van den Broecke | Men's giant slalom | DNF | | Did not advance | | | |
| Sam Maes | Men's slalom | DNF | | Did not advance | | | |
| Armand Marchant | Men's slalom | 56.13 | 24 | 51.72 | 22 | 1:47.85 | 22 |
| Dries Van den Broecke | Men's slalom | 56.77 | 27 | DNF | | | |

== Biathlon ==
Belgium qualified four male and 1 female biathletes and a men's relay team.

| Athlete | Event | Time | Misses | Rank |
|---|---|---|---|---|
| Cesar Beauvais | Men's sprint | 30:06.8 | 4 (1+3) | 94 |
| Cesar Beauvais | Men's pursuit | Did not qualify | | |
| Cesar Beauvais | Men's individual | 1:02:50.5 | 7 (1+1+1+4) | 91 |
| Florent Claude | Men's sprint | 27:35.1 | 4 (1+3) | 84 |
| Florent Claude | Men's pursuit | Did not qualify | | |
| Florent Claude | Men's individual | 57:11.2 | 5 (0+2+3+0) | 75 |
| Tom Lahaye-Goffart | Men's sprint | 28:15.1 | 1 (1+0) | 91 |
| Tom Lahaye-Goffart | Men's pursuit | Did not qualify | | |
| Tom Lahaye-Goffart | Men's individual | 1:02:26.2 | 7 (2+1+3+1) | 90 |
| Thierry Langer | Men's sprint | 26:59.8 | 1 (1+0) | 67 |
| Thierry Langer | Men's pursuit | Did not qualify | | |
| Thierry Langer | Men's individual | 57:18.3 | 5 (1+1+2+1) | 77 |
| Cesar Beauvais; Florent Claude; Tom Lahaye-Goffart; Thierry Langer | Men's team relay | LAP | | 20 |
| Lotte Lie | Women's sprint | 23:41.1 | 3 (3+0) | 64 |
| Lotte Lie | Women's pursuit | Did not qualify | | |
| Lotte Lie | Women's individual | 45:36.9 | 4 (1+2+0+1) | 45 |

== Bobsleigh ==
Belgium qualified one team for the women's bobsleigh competition.

| Athlete | Event | Run 1 | | Run 2 | | Run 3 | | Run 4 | | Total | |
| Athlete | Event | Time | Rank | Time | Rank | Time | Rank | Time | Rank | Time | Rank |
|---|---|---|---|---|---|---|---|---|---|---|---|
| Sara Aerts; An Vannieuwenhuyse* | Two-woman | 1:02.08 | 17 | 1:02.12 | 12 | 1:02.11 | 12 | 1:02.27 | 14 | 4:08.58 | 15 |

* – Denotes the driver of the sled

== Cross-country skiing ==
By meeting the basic qualification standards Belgium qualified one male cross-country skier.

Due to high winds and adverse weather conditions, the men's 50 km freestyle competition on 19 February was shortened to 30 km.

Distance

| Athlete | Event | Classical | | Freestyle | | Final | | |
| Athlete | Event | Time | Rank | Time | Rank | Time | Deficit | Rank |
|---|---|---|---|---|---|---|---|---|
| Thibaut De Marre | 15 km classical | —N/a | | | | 42:56.7 | +5:01.9 | 59 |
| Thibaut De Marre | 30 km skiathlon | 44:40.8 | 56 | LAP | | | | 54 |
| Thibaut De Marre | 50 km freestyle | —N/a | | | | 1:19:53.8 | +8:21.1 | 47 |

Sprint

| Athlete | Event | Qualification | | Quarterfinal | | Semifinal | | Final | |
| Athlete | Event | Time | Rank | Time | Rank | Time | Rank | Time | Rank |
|---|---|---|---|---|---|---|---|---|---|
| Thibaut de Marre | Men's | 3:10.66 | 76 | Did not advance | | | | | |

== Figure skating ==
In the 2021 World Figure Skating Championships in Stockholm, Sweden, Belgium secured one quota in the ladies singles competition.

Individual

| Athlete | Event | SP | | FS | | Total | |
| Athlete | Event | Points | Rank | Points | Rank | Points | Rank |
|---|---|---|---|---|---|---|---|
| Loena Hendrickx | Women's singles | 70.09 | 7 | 136.70 | 9 | 206.79 | 8 |

== Short track speed skating ==
Belgium has qualified two short track speed skaters (one of each gender).

| Athlete | Event | Heat | | Quarterfinal | | Semifinal | | Final | |
| Athlete | Event | Time | Rank | Time | Rank | Time | Rank | Time | Rank |
|---|---|---|---|---|---|---|---|---|---|
| Stijn Desmet | Men's 500 m | 40.585 | 3 **q** | 40.718 | 4 | Did not advance | | | 14 |
| Stijn Desmet | Men's 1000 m | **PEN** | | Did not advance | | | | | |
| Stijn Desmet | Men's 1500 m | —N/a | | 2:19.112 | 3 **Q** | 2:11.169 | 5 **FB** | 2:18.278 | 13 |
| **Hanne Desmet** | Women's 500 m | 43.702 | 3 **q** | 42.991 | 2 **Q** | 55.304 | 4 **FA** | 42.941 | 5 |
| **Hanne Desmet** | Women's 1000 m | 1:27.836 | 2 **Q** | 1:29.388 | 2 **Q** | 1:28.166 | 2 **QA** | 1:28.928 | 3rd place, bronze medalist(s) |
| **Hanne Desmet** | Women's 1500 m | —N/a | | 2:18.931 | 2 **Q** | 2:19.001 | 2 **QA** | 2:18.711 | 4 |

Key: FA = Qualified to medal round; FB = Qualified to consolation round; PEN = Penalty; Q = Qualified to next round based on position in heat; q = Qualified to next round based on time in field

== Skeleton ==
Belgium qualified a single female athlete for the skeleton event.

| Athlete | Event | Run 1 | | Run 2 | | Run 3 | | Run 4 | | Total | |
| Athlete | Event | Time | Rank | Time | Rank | Time | Rank | Time | Rank | Time | Rank |
|---|---|---|---|---|---|---|---|---|---|---|---|
| Kim Meylemans | Women's | 1:02.35 | =6 | 1:02.92 | 12 | 1:02.34 | 11 | 1:03.73 | 20 | 4:11.34 | 18 |

== Snowboarding ==
Belgium qualified a single female athlete for the snowboarding event.

Freestyle

| Athlete | Event | Qualification | | | | | Final | | | | |
| Athlete | Event | Run 1 | Run 2 | Run 3 | Best | Rank | Run 1 | Run 2 | Run 3 | Best | Rank |
|---|---|---|---|---|---|---|---|---|---|---|---|
| Evy Poppe | Women's big air | ~~44.00~~ | 60.75 | 21.00 | 81.75 | 24 | Did not advance | | | | |
| Evy Poppe | Women's slopestyle | 47.08 | 56.80 | —N/a | 56.80 | 14 | Did not advance | | | | |

== Speed skating ==
| Athlete | Event | Final | |
| Athlete | Event | Time | Rank |
|---|---|---|---|
| Bart Swings | Men's 1500 m | 1:45.82 | 13 |
| Bart Swings | Men's 5000 m | 6:16.90 | 7 |
| Bart Swings | Men's 10,000 m | 13:02.43 | 10 |
| Mathias Vosté | Men's 1000 m | 1:10.22 | 27 |
| Mathias Vosté | Men's 1500 m | 1:49.93 | 29 |
| Sandrine Tas | Women's 500 m | 39.37 | 28 |
| Sandrine Tas | Women's 1500 m | 2:03.39 | 29 |

Mass start

| Athlete | Event | Semifinal | | | Final | | |
| Athlete | Event | Points | Time | Rank | Points | Time | Rank |
|---|---|---|---|---|---|---|---|
| **Bart Swings** | Men's | 44 | 7:56.74 | 2 **Q** | 63 | 7:47.11 | 1st place, gold medalist(s) |
| Sandrine Tas | Women's | 0 | 8:37.77 | 12 | Did not advance | | 24 |

== See also ==
- Belgium at the 2022 Winter Paralympics
