= Michèle Brigitte Dombard =

Belgian alpine skier (born 1956)

Personal information
- Nationality: Belgian
- Born: 17 January 1956 (age 69); Brussels, Belgium

Sport
- Sport: Alpine skiing

Michèle Brigitte Dombard (born 17 January 1956) is a Belgian alpine skier. She competed in two events at the 1984 Winter Olympics.
