= Georges Pootmans (ice hockey) =

Belgian ice hockey player

Georges Roland Pootmans
Personal information
- Nationality: Belgian
- Born: 19 May 1917; Regina, Saskatchewan, Canada
- Died: 11 September 1976 (aged 59); Montreal, Quebec, Canada

Sport
- Sport: Ice hockey

Georges Pootmans (19 May 1917 – 11 September 1976) was a Belgian ice hockey player. He competed in the men's tournament at the 1936 Winter Olympics.
