= Eva Willemarck =

Belgian bobsledder (born 1984)

Eva Willemarck (born 28 June 1984) is a Belgian bobsledder who has competed since 2007. She finished 14th in the two-woman event at the 2010 Winter Olympics in Vancouver.

Willemarck also finished 18th in the two-woman event at the FIBT World Championships 2009 in Lake Placid, New York. Her best World Cup finish was 14th in the two-woman event at Winterberg in 2009.
