= Fernand Carez =

Belgian ice hockey player

Personal information
- Nationality: Belgian
- Born: 28 October 1905; Brussels, Belgium

Sport
- Sport: Ice hockey

Fernand Carez (born 28 October 1905, date of death unknown) was a Belgian ice hockey player. He competed in the men's tournament at the 1936 Winter Olympics.
