= Belgium at the 2014 Winter Olympics =

- IOC code: BEL
- NOC: Belgian Olympic and Interfederal Committee
- Website: www.teambelgium.be (in Dutch and French)

in Sochi
- Competitors: 7 in 5 sports
- Flag bearers: Hanna Mariën (opening); Bart Swings (closing)
- Medals: Gold 0 Silver 0 Bronze 0 Total 0

Winter Olympics appearances (overview)
- 1924; 1928; 1932; 1936; 1948; 1952; 1956; 1960; 1964; 1968; 1972; 1976; 1980; 1984; 1988; 1992; 1994; 1998; 2002; 2006; 2010; 2014; 2018; 2022; 2026

Belgium competed at the 2014 Winter Olympics in Sochi, Russia from 7 to 23 February 2014. The team consisted of seven athletes in five sports, one less than in 2010. The goal of the team was a few top-8 performances.

Belgian Prime Minister Elio Di Rupo did not plan to attend the 2014 Winter Olympics. He has not said publicly that the decision was a political gesture.

== Bobsleigh ==
Athlete	Event	Run 1		Run 2		Run 3		Run 4		Total	
Athlete	Event	Time	Rank	Time	Rank	Time	Rank	Time	Rank	Time	Rank
Hanna Mariën; Elfje Willemsen*	Two-woman	57.92	4	58.02	4	58.33	8	58.30	7	3:52.57	6

* – Denotes the driver of each sled

== Figure skating ==
Belgium has achieved the following quota places:

Athlete	Event	SP		FS		Total	
Athlete	Event	Points	Rank	Points	Rank	Points	Rank
Jorik Hendrickx	Men's singles	72.52	16 Q	141.52	15	214.04	16

== Freestyle skiing ==
According to the quota allocation released on January 20, 2014, Belgium has two athletes in qualification position, but rejected 1 quota in women's ski cross.

Halfpipe

Athlete	Event	Qualification				Final			
Athlete	Event	Run 1	Run 2	Best	Rank	Run 1	Run 2	Best	Rank
Katrien Aerts	Women's halfpipe	51.40	54.40	54.40	17	did not advance			

== Snowboarding ==
According to the quota allocation released on January 20, 2014, Belgium has one athlete in qualification position.

Athlete	Event	Qualification				Semifinal				Final			
Athlete	Event	Run 1	Run 2	Best	Rank	Run 1	Run 2	Best	Rank	Run 1	Run 2	Best	Rank
Seppe Smits	Men's slopestyle	88.25	91.00	91.00	5 QS	77.50	84.50	84.50	5	did not advance			

Qualification Legend: QF – Qualify directly to final; QS – Qualify to semifinal

== Speed skating ==
Based on the results from the fall World Cups during the 2013–14 ISU Speed Skating World Cup season, Belgium has earned the following start quotas:

Athlete	Event	Final	
Athlete	Event	Time	Rank
Bart Swings	Men's 1000 m	1:10.14	23
Bart Swings	Men's 1500 m	1:45.95	10
Bart Swings	Men's 5000 m	6:17.79	4
Bart Swings	Men's 10000 m	13:13.99	5
Jelena Peeters	Women's 1500 m	1:59.73	20
Jelena Peeters	Women's 3000 m	4:10.87	12

== Non-qualified sports ==
=== Alpine skiing ===
According to the quota allocation released on January 20, 2014, Belgium has six athletes in qualification position. However no alpine skiers were selected for the final team.

- Men's Events – 3 quota places
- Women's Events – 3 quota places
