= François Brueren =

Belgian speed skater

Personal information
- Nationality: Belgian
- Born: 16 January 1940 (age 85)

Sport
- Sport: Speed skating

François Brueren (born 16 January 1940) is a Belgian speed skater. He competed in the men's 500 metres event at the 1964 Winter Olympics.
