= Sofie Pintens =

Belgian short track speed skater

Personal information
- Born: 2 October 1974 (age 50); Reet, Antwerp, Belgium

Sport
- Country: Belgium
- Sport: Short track speed skating

Sofie Pintens (born 2 October 1974) is a former Belgian female short track speed skater. She competed at the 1994 Winter Olympics.

Sofie Pintens is the younger sister of Bea Pintens.
