= Eric de Spoelberch =

Eric Antoine Ghislain Joseph, Viscount de Spoelberch (15 February 1903 – 17 January 1939) was a Belgian pilot. He was born in Brussels and died in Nivelles.

== Family ==
He was son of Guillaume de Spoelberch (1874–1947) and Colienne de Neufforge (1882–1929). He married Katharine Kelso Stewart 28 April 1932, in Haverford; Katherine's mother was Elsie Foster Cassatt (1875–1931), a sportswoman from a prominent Pennsylvania family, niece of artist Mary Cassatt and great-niece of president James Buchanan. The couple had two sons, Guillaume and Jacques de Spoelberch. He is a brother of Werner de Spoelberch.

== Career ==
As a lieutenant in the Aéronautique Militaire he was one of two Belgian pilots sent to Britain to evaluate the Hawker Hurricane and the Supermarine Spitfire. In the following January he was killed in an air accident while flight-testing the new Renard R.36 fighter.

As a bobsledder he competed in the 1936 Winter Olympics in Garmisch-Partenkirchen; he finished eighth both in the two-man and four-man events.

== honours ==
- Knight in the Order of Leopold.
- Knight in the Order of Leopold II.
