= Albert Castelyns =

Bobsledder, water polo player (1917–1974)

Personal information
- Born: 2 May 1917 Borgerhout, Belgium
- Died: 17 June 1974 (aged 57) Berchem, Belgium
Medal record
Men's water polo
Representing Belgium
Olympic Games
Bronze medal – third place	1936 Berlin	Men

Albert Castelyns, also known as Albert Casteleyns (2 May 1917 – 17 June 1974) was a Belgian water polo player who competed in the late 1930s. In the 1950s, he competed in bobsleigh.

== Water polo career ==
At the 1936 Summer Olympics in Berlin he was part of the Belgian water polo team that won the bronze medal. Casteleyns played five matches.

== Bobsleigh career ==
In the 1950s Casteleyns competed in bobsleigh. Taking part in two Winter Olympics, he earned his best finish of sixth in the two-man event at Oslo in 1952.

== Death ==
Castelyns died in Berchem on 17 June 1974, at the age of 57.

== See also ==
- List of Olympic medalists in water polo (men)

== Sources ==
- 1952 bobsleigh two-man results
- 1956 bobsleigh two-man results
