= Bea Pintens =

Belgian speed skater

Personal information
- Born: 30 August 1972 (age 52); Reet, Antwerp, Belgium

Sport
- Country: Belgium
- Sport: Short track speed skating

Bea Pintens (born 30 August 1972) is a Belgian former short track speed skater. She competed at the 1992 Winter Olympics and at the 1994 Winter Olympics. In the 1994 Olympics, she was the flagbearer for Belgium.

Bea Pintens is the older sister of fellow Belgian short track speed skater, Sofie Pintens who has also represented Belgium at the 1994 Winter Olympics
