= Louis De Ridder =

Belgian winter sports athlete (1902–1981)

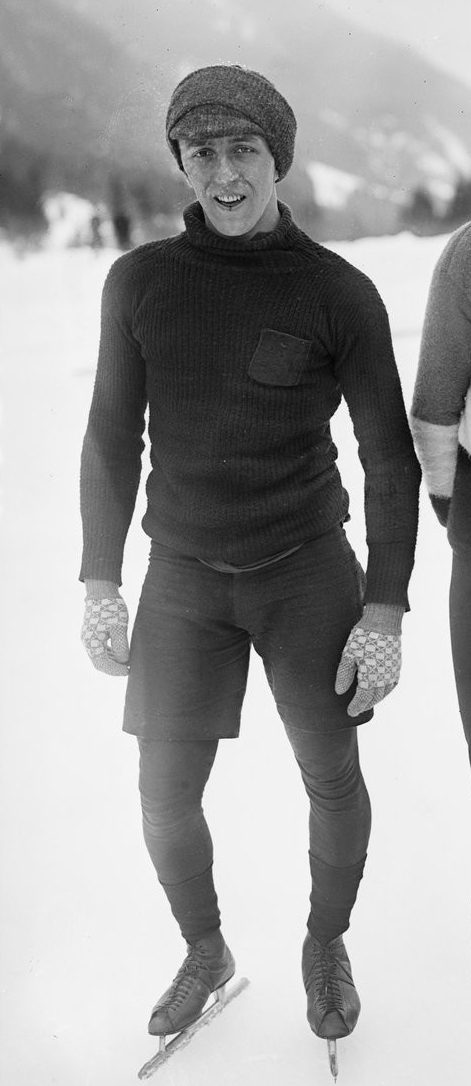
- De Ridder in 1922

Personal information
- Born: 9 June 1902 Antwerp, Belgium
- Died: 5 May 1981 (aged 78)

Sport
- Sport: Ice hockey, ice speed skating, bobsleigh
- Club: CSHB, Brussels

Achievements and titles
- Personal best(s): 500 m – 52.8 (1924); 1500 m – 3:01.8 (1924); 5000 m – 10:35.2 (1925)
Medal record
Representing Belgium
Ice Hockey European Championships
Bronze medal – third place	1924 Milan	Team
Silver medal – second place	1927 Vienna	Team

Louis De Ridder (9 June 1902 – 5 May 1981) was a Belgian athlete who competed in ice hockey, speed skating and bobsleigh at the 1924 and 1936 Winter Olympics. His best achievement was fifth place in the four-man bobsleigh event in 1936. As a speed skater, he placed 19th in both the 500 m and 1500 m events in 1924. He was part of the Belgian ice hockey teams that finished 7th and 13th in 1924 and 1936, respectively. He won two medals at the Ice Hockey European Championships in 1924 and 1927. He is sometimes confused with Emiel De Ridder who in 1930 represented Belgium at the first recorded and recognised European Roller Speed Skating Championships on the road in his home town of Anvers (Antwerp) where he took the gold medal in all three events, however, they are different people.
