= Ward Pétré =

Belgian speed skater (born 1997)

Personal information
- Full name: Ward Erelas M. Pétré
- Nationality: Belgian
- Born: 30 January 1997 (age 29) Sint-Truiden, Belgium
- Height: 1.78 m (5 ft 10 in)
- Weight: 75 kg (165 lb)

Sport
- Country: Belgium
- Sport: Short-track speed skating
Medal record
Men's short-track speed skating
Representing Belgium
Olympic Games
Bronze medal – third place	2026 Milano Cortina	Mixed 2000 m relay
World Championships
Bronze medal – third place	2026 Montreal	2000 m mixed relay
European Championships
Silver medal – second place	2023 Gdańsk	2000 m mixed relay
Silver medal – second place	2024 Gdańsk	5000 m relay
Bronze medal – third place	2024 Gdańsk	2000 m mixed relay
Bronze medal – third place	2025 Dresden	5000 m relay

Ward Erelas M. Pétré (born 30 January 1997) is a Belgian short track speed skater. At the 2026 Winter Olympics, he won a bronze medal in the mixed team relay.

== Career ==
Pétré was short track speed skating since he was nine at shorttrackclub YDS in Hasselt, Belgium and joined the national team at sixteen where he was primarily a member of the relay team, both in the men's and mixed relays. He won several medals with these teams at European Championships and World Cups. He competed in the 2018 Winter Olympics. He won a bronze medal in the 2026 Winter Olympics with Belgium's team in the mixed 2000 metre relay short-track speed skating. He was the first Belgian from the province of Limburg to win an medal at the Winter Olympic Games. A month later the Belgian mixed relay team and Pétré took again a bronze medal on a world stage coming in third in the 2000 m relay at the 2026 World Short Track Speed Skating Championships in Montreal, Canada.

== Personal life ==
Pétré was eight when his sister and he were given inline skates for their birthday. As their father wanted them to take lessons first, he started skating for toddlers at the ice rink De Schaverdijn in Hasselt, Belgium.

Besides skating, Pétré did classical ballet for sixteen years (where he met his future wife) and learned to play various musical instruments: first percussion, later trumpet and horn, and finally piano and guitar. Pétré holds an Educational Bachelor in Physical Education and Recreation from Hogeschool PXL and is a professional soldier.
