= Henri Mollin =

Belgian alpine skier (born 1958)

Henri Mollin (born 17 December 1958) is a Belgian former alpine skier who competed in the 1980 Winter Olympics and 1984 Winter Olympics.
