= Denis L. Feron =

Denis Lucien Emile Feron (March 22, 1928 – July 30, 2015) was the owner and Chief Executive Officer of the Midwestern copper smelter, Chemetco. He was born in Sint-Pieters-Woluwe, Belgium.

== Early life ==
Feron competed in the 1952 Winter Olympics and in the 1956 Winter Olympics in alpine skiing. In 1952 he finished 63rd in the downhill event, 73rd in the giant slalom competition, 46th in the slalom contest, but was eliminated in the first run. Four years later he finished 38th in the 1956 downhill event, 46th in the slalom competition, and 65th in the giant slalom contest. His older brother Michel competed in the 1948 and 1952 Winter Games, also in alpine skiing.

== Indictment ==
On April 21, 1999, a federal grand jury charged Chemetco Inc., Feron, and five of his employees with violating the United States Clean Water Act for using an illegal secret discharge pipe to deliberately pump hazardous waste water contaminated with various pollutants and industrial waste including cadmium, lead and zinc into Long Lake (Illinois), a tributary of the Mississippi River. Those named in the indictment were: Chemetco President Denis L. Feron, Gary Reed, George Boud Jr., Roger Copeland, Kevin Youngman, and Chemetco plant manager Bruce Hendrickson. Before filing for bankruptcy in 2001, Chemetco produced about 50% of the United States copper output from non-mined sources

=== Closure of case ===
- The Court never acquired personal jurisdiction over Denis Feron, due to Feron's having fled the United States.
- Feron paid $500,000 restitution to be expressly used to assist a USEPA environmental remediation program at and near the Chemetco plant site.
- All charges against Feron were subsequently dismissed by the Court.
