= Pierre Huylebroeck =

Belgian speed skater 1922–1989

Pierre A. J. Huylebroeck
Personal information
- Nationality: Belgian
- Born: 13 October 1922; Brussels, Belgium
- Died: 16 March 1989 (aged 66); Edegem, Belgium

Sport
- Sport: Speed skating

Pierre A. J. Huylebroeck (13 October 1922 – 16 March 1989) was a Belgian speed skater. He competed at the 1948 Winter Olympics, the 1952 Winter Olympics and the 1956 Winter Olympics.
