= Marcel Leclef =

Belgian bobsledder

Marcel Leclef (born 25 July 1909; date of death unknown) was a Belgian bobsledder and industrialist who competed from the late 1940s to the mid-1950s. Competing in three Winter Olympics, he earned his best finish of sixth in the two-man event at Oslo in 1952.

He was born in Antwerp.
