= Michel Feron =

Belgian alpine skier (1923–2014)

Personal information
- Nationality: Belgian
- Born: 13 May 1923; Vilvoorde, Belgium
- Died: 18 May 2014 (aged 91); Lasne, Belgium

Sport
- Sport: Alpine skiing

Michel Feron (13 May 1923 – 18 May 2014) was a Belgian alpine skier. He competed at the 1948 Winter Olympics and the 1952 Winter Olympics.

== Personal life ==
Michel Feron was born to Lucien Feron and Raymonde Feron (born Stoclet, the family who built the Stoclet Palace in Brussels). Michel Feron was married to Anne Feron (born Crombez). Around the time of their wedding, Michel Feron was the Belgian alpine skiing champion. And, Anne Feron was the Belgian water skiing champion.

Michel Feron remained an active and proficient sportsman throughout life. He remained an avid alpine skier throughout his entire life, skiing in both European and American ski resorts. He became a proficient water skier in his forties. Later, he learned snowboarding in his late sixties to early seventies.

Michel and Anne Feron are both survived by their three children Patrice Feron, Axel Feron, and Diane Feron. They are also survived by several grandchildren.

All three children (Patrice, Axel, and Diane), following their father's example, became proficient alpine ski racers themselves. Patrice and Diane, during the 1970s, were among the best Belgian alpine ski racers. Patrice and Diane remained in Belgium. Axel moved to Sydney, Australia, and became an artist.

Michel Feron had two siblings, Denis Feron and Suzanne van der Straten.

== Career ==
Michel Feron was active in the Belgium Navy at the tail end of WWII and afterwards. After his military career, he was active in various private sector enterprises.
