= Belgian Olympic and Interfederal Committee =

- Country: Belgium
- Code: BEL
- Created: 1906
- Recognized: 1906
- Continental Association: EOC
- Headquarters: Avenue de Boechout/Boechoutlaan 9, 1020 Brussels, Belgium
- President: Mr Jean-Michel Saive
- Secretary General: Mr Cédric Van Branteghem
- Website: www.teambelgium.be

Team Belgium logo

The Belgian Olympic and Interfederal Committee (Note: Dutch: Belgisch Olympisch en Interfederaal Comité, French: Comité Olympique et Interfédéral Belge, German: Belgisches Olympisches und Interföderales Komitee) (IOC Code: BEL), abbreviated BOIC or COIB, is the National Olympic Committee for Belgium. The administrative seat is located in Brussels.

On June 4, 2026, the General Assemblies of the Belgian Olympic and Interfederal Committee and the Belgian Paralympic Committee announced that as of January 1, 2027, both organizations will together form the Belgian Olympic & Paralympic Committee (BOPC) making Belgium the sixth country in the world (behind The Nederlands, the USA, Norway, Saudi-Arabia and South-Africa) where the National Olympic Committee and National Paralympic Committee are joined in one organisation.

== History ==
The Belgian Olympic and Interfederal Committee was founded and recognized by International Olympic Committee in 1906.

== List of presidents ==
President	Term
Edouard de Laveleye	1906–1923
Henri de Baillet-Latour	1923–1942
Prince Albert de Ligne	1942–1945
Rodolphe William Seeldrayers	1945–1955
Victor Boin	1955–1965
Raoul Mollet	1965–1989
Jacques Rogge	1989–1992
Adrien Vanden Eeden	1992–1998
Francois Narmon	1998–2004
Pierre-Olivier Beckers	2004–2021
Jean-Michel Saive	2021–present

== Executive committee ==
- President: Jean-Michel Saive
- Vice Presidents: Tom Van Damme, Dominique Monami
- CEO: Cédric Van Branteghem
- Treasurer: Pascal Mertens
- Members: Dominique Gavage, Sven Serré, Yuhan Tan, Gwenda Stevens

== Member federations ==
The Belgian National Federations are the organizations that coordinate all aspects of their individual sports. They are responsible for training, competition and development of their sports. There are currently 32 Olympic Summer and 7 Winter Sport Federations in Belgium.

National Federation	Summer or Winter	Headquarters
Royal Belgian Archery Federation	Summer	Strombeek-Bever
Royal Belgian Athletics Federation	Summer	Brussels
Belgian Badminton Federation	Summer	Sprimont
Royal Belgian Baseball and Softball Federation	Summer	Antwerp
Royal Belgian Basketball Federation	Summer	Brussels
Belgian Biathlon Federation	Winter	Bütgenbach
Belgian Federation for Bobsleigh and Skeleton	Winter	Waregem
Royal Belgian Boxing Federation	Summer	Brussels
Royal Belgian Canoe Federation	Summer	Haversin
Belgian Climbing and Mountaineering Federation	Summer	Brussels
Belgian Curling Association	Summer	Vilvoorde
Royal Belgian Cycling Federation	Summer	Brussels
Belgian Equestrian Federation	Summer	Zaventem
Royal Belgian Fencing Federation	Summer	Brussels
Royal Belgian Figure Skating Federation	Winter	Kortenberg
Royal Belgian Football Association	Summer	Brussels
Royal Belgian Golf Federation	Summer	Brussels
Royal Belgian Gymnastics Federation	Summer	Brussels
Royal Belgian Handball Federation	Summer	Ans
Royal Belgian Hockey Association	Summer	Brussels
Royal Belgian Ice Hockey Federation	Winter	Berchem
Royal Belgian Judo Federation	Summer	Zele
Belgian Karate Federation	Summer	Lebbeke
Belgian Modern Pentathlon Federation	Summer	Leuven
Belgian Federation of Roller Sports	Summer	Tienen
Belgian Rowing Federation	Summer	De Pinte
Belgian Rugby Federation	Summer	Brussels
Royal Belgian Shooting Sport Federation	Summer	Berchem
Royal Belgian Ski Federation	Winter	Berchem
Royal Belgian Speed Skating Federation	Winter	Hechtel-Eksel
Royal Belgian Swimming Federation	Summer	Brussels
Royal Belgian Table Tennis Federation	Summer	Brussels
Belgian Taekwondo Association	Summer	Lokeren
Royal Belgian Tennis Federation	Summer	Brussels
Belgian Triathlon and Duathlon Federation	Winter	Kessel-Lo
Royal Belgian Volleyball Federation	Summer	Brussels
Royal Belgian Weightlifting Federation	Summer	Petit-Enghien
Royal Belgian Wrestling Federation	Summer	Antwerp
Royal Belgium Yachting Federation	Summer	Antwerp

== See also ==
- Belgium at the Olympics
