= Ice hockey at the 1928 Winter Olympics – Rosters =

The ice hockey team rosters at the 1928 Winter Olympics consisted of the following players:

== Austria ==
Head coach: Edgar Dietrichstein

| Pos. | Name | Birthdate | Team |
|---|---|---|---|
| F | Herbert Brück | January 13, 1900 (aged 28) | (Germany) Berliner Schlittschuh-Club |
| F | Walter Brück | November 30, 1900 (aged 27) | N/A |
| D | Jacques Dietrichstein | September 20, 1906 (aged 21) | N/A |
| F | Hans Ertl | January 30, 1909 (aged 19) | N/A |
| F | Sepp Göbl | June 11, 1905 (aged 22) | N/A |
| G | Hans Kail | N/A | N/A |
| F | Herbert Klang | 1908 (aged 19/20) | (Austria) Wiener EV |
| F | Uldrich Lederer (C) | August 18, 1897 (aged 30) | (Austria) Wiener EV |
| F | Walter Sell | October 4, 1906 (aged 21) | N/A |
| | Reginald Spevak | February 21, 1898 (aged 29) | N/A |
| F | Hans Tatzer | May 25, 1905 (aged 22) | N/A |
| G | Hermann Weiß | March 17, 1909 (aged 18) | N/A |

== Belgium ==
Head coach: Jean de Craene

| Pos. | Name | Birthdate | Team |
|---|---|---|---|
| F | André Bautier | 1907 (aged 20/21) | (Belgium) CP Antwerp |
| D | Roger Bureau | February 1, 1905 (aged 23) | (Belgium) LP Antwerp |
| G | Hector Chotteau | May 24, 1898 (aged 29) | (Belgium) CP Antwerp |
| F | Albert Collon | N/A | (Belgium) LP Antwerp |
| D | François Franck | September 14, 1904 (aged 23) | N/A |
| F | William Hoorickx | April 12, 1900 (aged 27) | (Belgium) CP Antwerp |
| F | Willy Kreitz | September 21, 1903 (aged 24) | N/A |
| F | Jean Meeus | June 3, 1905 (aged 22) | (Belgium) CP Antwerp |
| F | David Meyer | N/A | (Belgium) LP Antwerp |
| F | Marco Peltzer | November 18, 1909 (aged 18) | (Belgium) CP Antwerp |
| F/D | Jacques Van Reysschoot | May 2, 1905 (aged 22) | (Belgium) LP Antwerp |
| F | Pierre Van Reysschoot (C) | December 9, 1906 (aged 21) | (Belgium) LP Antwerp |
| F | Jean van de Wouwer | 1910 (aged 17/18) | (Belgium) CP Antwerp |

== Canada ==
Head coach: Conn Smythe

| Pos. | Name | Birthdate | Team |
|---|---|---|---|
| F | Charles Delahey | March 19, 1905 (aged 22) | (Canada) University of Toronto Grads |
| D | Frank Fisher | January 1, 1901 (aged 27) | (Canada) University of Toronto Grads |
| F | Grant Gordon | October 13, 1900 (aged 27) | (Canada) University of Toronto Grads |
| F | Louis Hudson | May 16, 1898 (aged 29) | (Canada) University of Toronto Grads |
| G | Norbert Mueller | February 14, 1906 (aged 21) | (Canada) University of Toronto Grads |
| F | Herbert Plaxton | April 22, 1901 (aged 26) | (Canada) University of Toronto Grads |
| F | Hugh Plaxton | May 16, 1904 (aged 23) | (Canada) University of Toronto Grads |
| F | Roger Plaxton | June 2, 1904 (aged 23) | (Canada) University of Toronto Grads |
| D | John Porter (C) | January 21, 1904 (aged 24) | (Canada) University of Toronto Grads |
| F | Frank Sullivan | July 26, 1898 (aged 29) | (Canada) University of Toronto Grads |
| G | Joseph Sullivan | January 8, 1901 (aged 27) | (Canada) University of Toronto Grads |
| D | Ross Taylor | April 26, 1902 (aged 25) | (Canada) University of Toronto Grads |
| F | Dave Trottier | June 25, 1906 (aged 21) | (Canada) University of Toronto Grads |

== Czechoslovakia ==
Head coach: František Lorenz

| Pos. | Name | Birthdate | Team |
|---|---|---|---|
| D | Wolfgang Dorasil | March 7, 1903 (aged 24) | (Czechoslovakia) Troppauer EV |
| F | Karel Hromádka | May 23, 1905 (aged 22) | (Czechoslovakia) LTC Praha |
| F | Jan Krásl | August 10, 1899 (aged 28) | (Czechoslovakia) HC Slavia Praha |
| F | Erwin Lichnofsky | August 6, 1903 (aged 24) | (Czechoslovakia) Troppauer EV |
| F | Josef Maleček | June 18, 1903 (aged 24) | (Czechoslovakia) LTC Praha |
| G | Jan Peka | July 27, 1894 (aged 33) | (Czechoslovakia) LTC Praha |
| D | Jaroslav Pušbauer | July 31, 1901 (aged 26) | (Czechoslovakia) LTC Praha |
| G | Jaroslav Řezáč | February 6, 1886 (aged 42) | (Czechoslovakia) HC Slavia Praha |
| F | Josef Šroubek (C) | December 2, 1891 (aged 36) | (Czechoslovakia) HC Slavia Praha |
| F | Bohumil Steigenhöfer | March 1, 1905 (aged 22) | (Czechoslovakia) HC Slavia Praha |
| F | Jiří Tožička | November 14, 1901 (aged 26) | (Czechoslovakia) LTC Praha |

== France ==
| Pos. | Name | Birthdate | Team |
|---|---|---|---|
| F/D | André Charlet | April 23, 1898 (aged 29) | (France) Chamonix |
| D | Raoul Couvert | June 24, 1903 (aged 24) | (France) Chamonix |
| F | Alfred de Rauch (C) | June 1, 1887 (aged 40) | (France) CSH Paris |
| G | Robert George | June 10, 1893 (aged 34) | (France) CSH Paris |
| F | Albert Hassler | November 2, 1903 (aged 24) | (France) Chamonix |
| D | Jacques Lacarrière | July 25, 1906 (aged 21) | (France) CSH Paris |
| G | Philippe Lefebure | June 18, 1908 (aged 19) | (France) CSH Paris |
| F | François Mautin | May 9, 1907 (aged 20) | (France) CSH Paris |
| F | Calixte Payot | April 21, 1901 (aged 26) | (France) Chamonix |
| D | Philippe Payot | December 21, 1893 (aged 34) | (France) Chamonix |
| F | Léon Quaglia | January 4, 1896 (aged 32) | (France) Chamonix |
| F | Gérard Simond | May 11, 1904 (aged 23) | (France) Chamonix |

== Germany ==
Head coach: Erich Römer

| Pos. | Name | Birthdate | Team |
|---|---|---|---|
| F | Alex Gruber | June 27, 1901 (aged 26) | (Germany) SC Riessersee |
| F/D | Gustav Jaenecke | May 22, 1908 (aged 19) | (Germany) Berliner Schlittschuh-Club |
| F | Wolfgang Kittel | November 11, 1899 (aged 28) | (Germany) Berliner Schlittschuh-Club |
| D/F | Franz Kreisel | January 6, 1890 (aged 38) | (Germany) SC Riessersee |
| G | Fritz Lincke | N/A | (Germany) Berliner Schlittschuh-Club |
| F | Fritz Rammelmayr | July 27, 1893 (aged 34) | (Germany) SC Riessersee |
| D/F | Erich Römer | June 2, 1894 (aged 33) | (Germany) Berliner Schlittschuh-Club |
| D | Walter Sachs (C) | October 23, 1892 (aged 35) | (Germany) Berliner Schlittschuh-Club |
| D | Hans Schmid | December 28, 1898 (aged 29) | (Germany) SC Riessersee |
| F | Martin Schröttle | September 1, 1901 (aged 26) | (Germany) SC Riessersee |
| F | Marquard Slevogt | March 22, 1909 (aged 18) | (Germany) SC Riessersee |
| G | Alfred Steinke | June 6, 1881 (aged 46) | (Germany) Berliner Schlittschuh-Club |

== Great Britain ==
| Pos. | Name | Birthdate | Team |
|---|---|---|---|
| F | Colin Carruthers | September 17, 1890 (aged 37) | N/A |
| F | Eric Carruthers | October 11, 1895 (aged 32) | N/A |
| F | Ross Cuthbert (C) | February 6, 1892 (aged 36) | N/A |
| F | Bernard Fawcett | April 28, 1909 (aged 18) | (Switzerland) Rosey Gstaad |
| F | Harold Greenwood | November 15, 1894 (aged 33) | N/A |
| D | Wilbert Hurst-Brown | September 24, 1899 (aged 28) | (England) London Lions |
| F | Frederic Neville Melland | April 3, 1904 (aged 23) | N/A |
| G | John Rogers | August 22, 1910 (aged 17) | N/A |
| D | Blaine Sexton | May 3, 1891 (aged 36) | (England) London Lions |
| G | William Speechley | July 5, 1906 (aged 21) | (England) Cambridge Blues |
| F | Victor Tait | July 8, 1882 (aged 45) | N/A |
| D | Cecil Wylde | January 28, 1904 (aged 24) | (England) Cambridge Blues |

== Hungary ==
Head coach: (Canada) Phil Taylor

| Pos. | Name | Birthdate | Team |
|---|---|---|---|
| D | Miklós Barcza | January 7, 1908 (aged 20) | (Hungary) BKE Budapest |
| D/F | Frigyes Barna | February 27, 1896 (aged 31) | (Hungary) BKE Budapest |
| F/D | Mátyás Farkas | August 13, 1903 (aged 24) | (Hungary) BKE Budapest |
| G | Tibor Heinrich | November 3, 1898 (aged 29) | (Hungary) BKE Budapest |
| F | Péter Krempels | September 17, 1897 (aged 30) | (Hungary) BKE Budapest |
| D | István Krepuska | August 8, 1899 (aged 28) | (Hungary) BKE Budapest |
| F | Géza Lator (C) | February 3, 1889 (aged 39) | (Hungary) BKE Budapest |
| F | Sándor Minder | October 25, 1907 (aged 20) | (Hungary) BKE Budapest |
| G | Béla Ordódy | January 13, 1880 (aged 48) | (Hungary) BKE Budapest |
| F | József Révay | October 20, 1902 (aged 25) | (Hungary) BKE Budapest |
| F | Béla Weiner | September 4, 1896 (aged 31) | (Hungary) BKE Budapest |

== Poland ==
Head coach: Tadeusz Adamowski

| Pos. | Name | Birthdate | Team |
|---|---|---|---|
| F | Tadeusz Adamowski (C) | November 19, 1901 (aged 26) | (Poland) AZS Warszawa |
| G | Edmund Czaplicki | October 30, 1904 (aged 23) | (Poland) AZS Warszawa |
| D/F | Aleksander Kowalski | October 7, 1902 (aged 25) | (Poland) AZS Warszawa |
| F | Włodzimierz Krygier | January 29, 1900 (aged 28) | N/A |
| F/D | Lucjan Kulej | November 29, 1896 (aged 31) | (Poland) AZS Warszawa |
| F | Stanisław Pastecki | November 12, 1907 (aged 20) | (Poland) Legia Warszawa |
| F | Aleksander Słuczanowski | September 13, 1900 (aged 27) | (Poland) AZS Warszawa |
| G | Józef Stogowski | November 27, 1899 (aged 28) | (Poland) TKS Toruń |
| F | Karol Szenajch | February 11, 1907 (aged 21) | (Poland) Legia Warszawa |
| F | Aleksander Tupalski | October 5, 1900 (aged 27) | (Poland) AZS Warszawa |
| F | Kazimierz Żebrowski | March 4, 1891 (aged 36) | (Poland) AZS Warszawa |

== Sweden ==
Head coaches: Viking Harbom

| Pos. | Name | Birthdate | Team |
|---|---|---|---|
| D | Carl Abrahamsson (C) | May 1, 1896 (aged 31) | (Sweden) Södertälje SK |
| F | Emil Bergman | July 28, 1908 (aged 19) | (Sweden) Nacka SK |
| F | Birger Holmqvist | December 28, 1900 (aged 27) | (Sweden) IK Göta |
| F/D | Gustaf Johansson | September 14, 1900 (aged 27) | (Sweden) IK Göta |
| D | Henry Johansson | September 23, 1897 (aged 30) | (Sweden) Södertälje SK |
| G | Nils Johansson | October 13, 1904 (aged 23) | (Sweden) Djurgårdens IF |
| F | Ernst Karlberg | October 12, 1901 (aged 26) | (Sweden) Djurgårdens IF |
| F | Erik Larsson | January 18, 1905 (aged 23) | (Sweden) Hammarby IF |
| F | Bertil Linde | February 28, 1907 (aged 20) | (Sweden) Karlsberg BK |
| F | Wilhelm Petersén | October 2, 1906 (aged 21) | (Sweden) Södertälje SK |
| G | Kurt Sucksdorff | May 10, 1904 (aged 23) | (Sweden) IK Göta |
| F | Sigfrid Öberg | February 22, 1907 (aged 20) | (Sweden) Hammarby IF |

== Switzerland ==
Head coach: (Canada) Bobby Bell

| Pos. | Name | Birthdate | Team |
|---|---|---|---|
| F | Giannin Andreossi | July 2, 1902 (aged 25) | (Switzerland) EHC St. Moritz |
| F/D | Mezzi Andreossi | June 30, 1897 (aged 30) | (Switzerland) EHC St. Moritz |
| F | Robert Breiter | March 28, 1909 (aged 18) | (Switzerland) EHC St. Moritz |
| F | Louis Dufour (C) | July 28, 1901 (aged 26) | (Switzerland) Rosey Gstaad |
| G | Charles Fasel | May 21, 1898 (aged 29) | (Switzerland) HC Davos |
| D | Albert Geromini | April 10, 1896 (aged 31) | (Switzerland) HC Davos |
| F/D | Fritz Kraatz | February 4, 1906 (aged 22) | (Switzerland) HC Davos |
| G | Arnold Martignoni | May 19, 1901 (aged 26) | (Switzerland) EHC St. Moritz |
| F | Heini Meng | November 20, 1902 (aged 25) | (Switzerland) HC Davos |
| F | Anton Morosani | June 20, 1907 (aged 20) | (Switzerland) HC Davos |
| D | Luzius Rüedi | June 12, 1900 (aged 27) | (Switzerland) HC Davos |
| F | Bibi Torriani | January 10, 1911 (aged 17) | (Switzerland) EHC St. Moritz |

== Sources ==
- Duplacey, James (1998). Total Hockey: The official encyclopedia of the National Hockey League. Total Sports. ISBN 0-8362-7114-9.
- Podnieks, Andrew (2010). IIHF Media Guide & Record Book 2011. Moydart Pres.
- Hockey Hall Of Fame page on the 1928 Olympics
- Wallechinsky, David (1988). The Complete Book of the Olympics. Penguin Books. pp. 614. ISBN 0-14-010771-1.
