= List of Olympic men's ice hockey players for Belgium =

Men's ice hockey tournaments have been staged at the Olympic Games since 1920. The men's tournament was introduced at the 1920 Summer Olympics, and permanently added to the Winter Olympic Games in 1924. Belgium has participated in four tournaments: 1920, 1924, 1928, and 1936. The 1920 Olympics was hosted by Belgium, in the city of Antwerp. A total of 5 goaltenders and 27 skaters have represented Belgium at the Olympics.

Pierre Van Reysschoot has scored the most goals, 6; assists and penalties were not accurately recorded in the early Olympic tournaments. Roger Bureau, François Franck, Willy Kreitz, and Van Reysschoot all played in the most games, 6. Those four plus Louis De Ridder, Charles Van den Driessche, Gaston van Volxem, and Philippe Van Volckxsom all played in two Olympics, the most for Belgium. Only one player, Paul Loicq has been inducted into the IIHF Hall of Fame, as a builder (executive) in 1997.

== Key ==
General terms
Term	Definition
GP	Games played
IIHFHOF	International Ice Hockey Federation Hall of Fame
Olympics	Number of Olympic Games tournaments
Ref(s)	Reference(s)

Goaltender statistical abbreviations
Abbreviation	Definition
W	Wins
L	Losses
T	Ties
Min	Minutes played
SO	Shutouts
GA	Goals against
GAA	Goals against average

== Goaltenders ==
Goaltenders
Player	Olympics	Tournament(s)	GP	W	L	T	Min	SO	GA	GAA	Notes	Ref(s)
Robert Baudinne	1	1936	–	–	–	–	–	–	–	–		
Hector Chotteau	1	1928	–	–	–	–	–	–	–	–		
Paul Van den Broeck	1	1924	–	–	–	–	–	–	–	–		
François Vergult	1	1920	–	–	–	–	–	–	–	–		
Victor Verschueren	1	1924	–	–	–	–	–	–	–	–		

== Skaters ==
Skaters
Player	Olympics	Tournaments	GP	Goals	Notes	Ref(s)
Walter Bastenie	1	1936	3	0		
André Bautier	1	1928	3	0		
Roger Bureau	2	1928, 1936	6	0		
Fernand Carez	1	1936	1	0		
Albert Collon	1	1928	3	0		
Maurice Deprez	1	1920	1	0		
Louis De Ridder	2	1924, 1936	5	0		
François Franck	2	1924, 1928	6	0		
Paul Goeminne	1	1920	1	0		
Jean-Maurice Goossens	1	1920	1	0		
William Hoorickx	1	1928	3	0		
Willy Kreitz	2	1928, 1936	6	0		
Joseph Lekens	1	1936	3	0		
Paul Loicq	1	1920	1	0	IIHFHOF (1998)	
Henri Louette	1	1924	3	2		
Jean Meeus	1	1928	3	0		
David Meyer	1	1928	3	1		
Marco Peltzer	1	1928	3	4		
Georges Pootmans	1	1936	3	2		
André Poplimont	1	1924	3	2		
Fréderic Rudolph	1	1924	3	1		
Charles Van den Driessche	2	1924, 1936	5	0		
Jean Van Der Wouwer	1	1928	3	0		
Jacques Van Reysschoot	1	1928	3	1		
Pierre Van Reysschoot	2	1928, 1936	6	5		
Philippe Van Volckxsom	2	1920, 1924	4	1		
Gaston van Volxem	2	1920, 1924	4	2		
