= List of ice hockey players who died in wars =

This is a list of ice hockey players who died in wars. The team is the last team the person played for.

^{*} : Member of the Hockey Hall of Fame

== World War I ==
Name	Age	Year died	Position	Team	Last year played	Service	Notes
Hobey Baker^{*}	26	1918	Right winger	St. Nicholas Hockey Club	1916	United States Army Air Service	Crashed while testing a repaired airplane.
Willi Bliesener	Unknown	1917	Goaltender	Berliner Schlittschuhclub	1914	Imperial German Army	Killed in action in Belgium.
Scotty Davidson^{*}	24	1915	Right winger / defenceman	Toronto Blueshirts	1914	Canadian Expeditionary Force	There are several conflicting versions of how he died.
Michael Joseph Hayes	24	1918	Forward	Colgate University	1917	United States Army	Killed by machine-gun fire while assaulting the town of Saint-Juvin.
Frank McGee^{*}	33	1916	Centre / rover	Ottawa HC	1906	Canadian Expeditionary Force	Killed in action during the Battle of the Somme.
George Richardson^{*}	29	1916	Left winger	Kingston Frontenacs	1912	Canadian Expeditionary Force	Killed in action.

== World War II ==
Two National Hockey League players were killed in World War II.

Name	Age	Year died	Position	Team	Last year played	Service	Notes
Bobby Bell	35	1940	Right winger	McGill Redbirds	1930	/	Executed in the Abbeville massacre.
Roger Bureau	40	1945	Defenceman	Cercle des Patineurs Anversoises	1936	Allied Forces	Executed in a German prison camp in April 1945.
Edmund Czaplicki	35	1940	Goaltender	AZS Warsaw	1930	/	
Dudley Garrett	20	1944	Defenceman	New York Rangers	1943	Royal Canadian Navy	The corvette HMCS Shawinigan (K136) was torpedoed and sunk by the U-boat U-1228, with the loss of all hands.
Karel Hartmann	59	1944	Rover	Czechoslovakia	1928	/	Died in the Auschwitz concentration camp.
Günther Kelch	26	1943	Forward	Zehlendorfer Wespen	1939	Luftwaffe	He was awarded the Ehrenpokal der Luftwaffe. He died in July 1943 in Gatchina, near Leningrad when a 21 cm rocket exploded in its under-wing launcher (tube), setting his AC on fire.
Aleksander Kowalski	37	1940	Defenceman / Forward	AZS Warsaw	1932	/	Killed in the Katyn massacre.
Russell McConnell	24	1942	Right winger	Montréal Royals	1942	Royal Canadian Navy	Killed in action in the Gulf of St. Lawrence on the ship HMCS Raccoon.
Camillo Mussi	28	1940	Forward	Hockey Club Milano	1936	Italian Air Force	Killed after the plane he was piloting was shot down in Egypt.
József de Révay	42	1945	Centre	Budapesti Korcsolyázó Egylet	1933	/	Arrested by the Communist police, interrogated and eventually killed on 19 April 1945.
Franz Schüßler	31	1942	Defenceman	EK Engelmann Wien	1939	Wehrmacht	Died in a Soviet prisoner-of-war camp in Yushnevo in the Tver Oblast.
Aleksander Słuczanowski	41	1942	Defenceman	AZS Warsaw	1931	/	
Alfred Steinke	63	1945	Forward / Defenceman	Berliner Schlittschuhclub	1930	Wehrmacht	Killed in action.
Norbert Sterle	24	1943	Forward	Kansas City Americans	1942	United States Army	Killed on a routine scouting mission in Italy after the Germans had been forced to abandon the Barbara Line.
Hans Tatzer	39	1944	Left winger	EK Engelmann Wien	1938	Wehrmacht	Killed in action in Southern France.
Rudolf Tobien	26/27	1942	Defenceman	Düsseldorfer EG	1941	Wehrmacht	Died on the Eastern Front.
Joe Turner	25	1944 or 1945	Goaltender	Detroit Red Wings	1942	United States Army	Initially listed as missing in action in the Battle of Hürtgen Forest.
Kazimierz Żebrowski	48/49	1940	Defenceman	AZS Warsaw	1931	/	

== Vietnam War ==
Name	Age	Year died	Position	Team	Last year played	Service	Notes
Tom Brindley	24	1968	Defenceman	Colorado College Tigers	1964	United States Army	Killed in battle when his platoon reached the top of Hill 881.
Steven Riggs	25	1968	Centre	Colgate Raiders	1965	United States Army	

== War in Afghanistan ==
Name	Age	Year died	Position	Team	Last year played	Service	Notes
Derek Hines	25	2005	Forward	Army Black Knights	2003	United States Army	
Tom Kennedy	Unknown	2012	Defenceman	Army Black Knights	1999	United States Army	Killed in a suicide bomb attack.

== See also ==
- List of ice hockey players who died during their playing careers
