= Hungary at the 1928 Winter Olympics =

- IOC code: HUN
- NOC: Hungarian Olympic Committee
- Website: www.olimpia.hu (in Hungarian and English)

in St. Moritz
- Competitors: 13 in 4 sports
- Flag bearer: Gyula Szepes
- Medals: Gold 0 Silver 0 Bronze 0 Total 0

Winter Olympics appearances (overview)
- 1924; 1928; 1932; 1936; 1948; 1952; 1956; 1960; 1964; 1968; 1972; 1976; 1980; 1984; 1988; 1992; 1994; 1998; 2002; 2006; 2010; 2014; 2018; 2022; 2026

Hungary competed at the 1928 Winter Olympics in St. Moritz, Switzerland.

== Cross-country skiing ==
Men

| Event | Athlete | Race | |
| Event | Athlete | Time | Rank |
|---|---|---|---|
| 18 km | Ferenc Németh | DNF | – |
| 18 km | Gyula Szepes | DNF | – |

== Ice hockey ==
=== Group A ===
The top team (highlighted) advanced to the medal round.

| Team | GP | W | L | GF | GA |
|---|---|---|---|---|---|
| Great Britain | 3 | 2 | 1 | 10 | 6 |
| France | 3 | 2 | 1 | 6 | 5 |
| Belgium | 3 | 2 | 1 | 9 | 10 |
| Hungary | 3 | 0 | 3 | 2 | 6 |

| February 11 | France | 2:0 (0:0,2:0,0:0) | Hungary |
| February 12 | Belgium | 3:2 (0:1,3:1,0:0) | Hungary |
| February 15 | Great Britain | 1:0 (1:0,0:0,0:0) | Hungary |

| — | Hungary |
| | Miklós Barcza (BBTE); Frigyes Barna (BKE); Mátyás Farkas (BKE); Tibor Heinrich (BKE); Péter Krempels (BKE); István Krepuska (BKE); Géza Lator (BKE); Sándor Minder (BKE); Béla Ordódy (BKE); József Révay (BKE); Béla Weiner (BKE) |

== Nordic combined ==
Events:

- 18 km cross-country skiing
- normal hill ski jumping

The cross-country skiing part of this event was combined with the main medal event of cross-country skiing. Those results can be found above in this article in the cross-country skiing section. Some athletes (but not all) entered in both the cross-country skiing and Nordic combined event, their time on the 18 km was used for both events. One would expect that athletes competing at the Nordic combined event, would participate in the cross-country skiing event as well, as they would have the opportunity to win more than one medal. This was not always the case due to the maximum number of athletes that could represent a country per event.

The ski jumping (normal hill) event was held separate from the main medal event of ski jumping, results can be found in the table below.

| Athlete | Event | Cross-country | | | Ski Jumping | | | | Total | |
| Athlete | Event | Time | Points | Rank | Distance 1 | Distance 2 | Total points | Rank | Points | Rank |
|---|---|---|---|---|---|---|---|---|---|---|
| Gyula Szepes | Individual | DNF | – | – | – | – | – | – | DNF | – |

== Speed skating ==
Men

| Event | Athlete | Race | |
| Event | Athlete | Time | Rank |
|---|---|---|---|
| 500 m | Zoltán Eötvös | 46.8 | 19 |
| 1500 m | Zoltán Eötvös | 2:27.9 | 10 |
| 5000 m | Zoltán Eötvös | 9:34.4 | 20 |

== Sources ==
- Comité Olympique Suisse (1928). Résultats des Concours des II^{mes} Jeux Olympiques d'hiver (PDF) (in French). Lausanne: Imprimerie du Léman. Archived from the original (PDF) on 2010-12-17.
- Olympic Winter Games 1928, full results by sports-reference.com
