= 1931 Ice Hockey World Championships =

1931 edition of the World Ice Hockey Championships

Tournament details
- Host country: Poland
- Venue: 1 (in 1 host city)
- Dates: 1–8 February
- Teams: 10

Final positions
- Champions: Canada (5th title)
- Runners-up: United States
- Third place: Austria
- Fourth place: Poland

Tournament statistics
- Games played: 29
- Goals scored: 119 (4.1 per game)
- Scoring leader: (United States) Charles Ramsay (8 goals)

The 1931 Ice Hockey World Championships was the fifth World Championship, an annual international ice hockey tournament. It took place between 1 and 8 February 1931 in Krynica, Poland. The tournament was won by Canada who were represented by the University of Manitoba Grads team, claiming their fifth world championship title by finishing on top of the group in the final round with a total of nine points. The United States finished second to win the silver medal, losing only one game to Canada and Austria finished third for the bronze medal. The host nation of Poland finished fourth at the tournament after winning one game, tying one, and losing three in the final round.

The World Championship also acted simultaneously as the 15th European Championship. Austria who finished highest of the European teams in third were named the champions.

== First round ==
Four teams compete in the First round each playing one game. The winning teams advance to the Second round and the losing teams compete in the consolation round.

February 1, 1931	Czechoslovakia	4–1 (2–0, 1–1, 1–0)	Hungary	Lodowisko, Krynica

February 1, 1931	Austria	1 – 0 2OT (0–0, 0–0, 0–0) (OT: 0–0, 1–0)	Great Britain	Lodowisko, Krynica

== Second round ==
Eight teams compete in the Second round each playing one game. The winning teams advance to the Final round and the losing teams compete in the Third round.

February 1, 1931	Canada	9–0 (1–0, 4–0, 4–0)	France	Lodowisko, Krynica

February 2, 1931	Czechoslovakia	4–1 (0–0, 3–0, 1–1)	Poland	Lodowisko, Krynica

February 2, 1931	Sweden	3–1 (0–1, 2–0, 1–0)	Austria	Lodowisko, Krynica

February 2, 1931	United States	15–0 (7–0, 5–0, 3–0)	Romania	Lodowisko, Krynica

== Third round ==
The four losing teams from the Second round compete in the Third round each playing one game. The winning teams advance to the Final round and the losing teams compete in the consolation round.

February 3, 1931	Poland	2 – 1 OT (1–0, 0–0, 0–1) (OT: 1–0)	France	Lodowisko, Krynica

February 3, 1931	Austria	7–0 (4–0, 0–0, 3–0)	Romania	Lodowisko, Krynica

== Final round ==
The six participating teams played a round-robin, with the top three teams winning gold, silver and bronze respectively. Canada's University of Manitoba Grads won the tournament with a total of nine points after winning four games and tying one. Sweden's 0 – 0 tie with Canada was the first time a European team did not lose to a team representing Canada in a World Championship match. Due to a tie between Czechoslovakia and Poland in points, fourth spot was given to Poland who had more total goals scored.

Team	GP	W	T	L	GF	GA	DIF	PTS
Canada	5	4	1	0	15	0	+15	9:1
United States	5	4	0	1	7	3	+4	8:2
Austria	5	2	0	3	5	13	−8	4:6
Poland	5	1	1	3	3	6	−3	3:7
Czechoslovakia	5	1	1	3	2	5	−3	3:7
Sweden	5	1	1	3	1	6	−5	3:7

February 4, 1931	United States	2–1	Austria	Lodowisko, Krynica

February 4, 1931	Canada	2–0	Czechoslovakia	Lodowisko, Krynica

February 4, 1931	Poland	2–0	Sweden	Lodowisko, Krynica

February 5, 1931	Czechoslovakia	2–1	Austria	Lodowisko, Krynica

February 5, 1931	United States	3–0	Sweden	Lodowisko, Krynica

February 5, 1931	Canada	3–0	Poland	Lodowisko, Krynica

February 6, 1931	United States	1–0	Czechoslovakia	Lodowisko, Krynica

February 6, 1931	Canada	0–0	Sweden	Lodowisko, Krynica

February 6, 1931	Austria	2–1	Poland	Lodowisko, Krynica

February 7, 1931	Sweden	1–0	Czechoslovakia	Lodowisko, Krynica

February 7, 1931	Canada	8–0	Austria	Lodowisko, Krynica

February 7, 1931	United States	1–0	Poland	Lodowisko, Krynica

February 8, 1931	Austria	1–0	Sweden	Lodowisko, Krynica

February 8, 1931	Poland	0–0	Czechoslovakia	Lodowisko, Krynica

February 8, 1931	Canada	2–0	United States	Lodowisko, Krynica

== Consolation round ==
The four participating teams played a round-robin, with games played between February 4 to February 7. The winner Hungary won all three games, finishing with six points and earning sixth place in the overall standings.

Team	GP	W	T	L	GF	GA	DIF	PTS
Hungary	3	3	0	0	13	2	+11	6:0
Great Britain	3	2	0	1	14	4	+10	4:2
France	3	1	0	2	8	4	+4	2:4
Romania	3	0	0	3	2	27	−25	0:6

Hungary	3–1	Great Britain	Lodowisko, Krynica

France	7–1	Romania	Lodowisko, Krynica

Hungary	9–1	Romania	Lodowisko, Krynica

Great Britain	2–1	France	Lodowisko, Krynica

Great Britain	11–0	Romania	Lodowisko, Krynica

Hungary	1–0	France	Lodowisko, Krynica

== 15th European Championship ==
The 1931 World Championship also acted simultaneously as the 15th European Championships. Austria were named champions after finishing as the highest ranked European team in the tournament in third. Second and third were awarded to Poland and Czechoslovakia respectively.

=== Austrian winning team ===
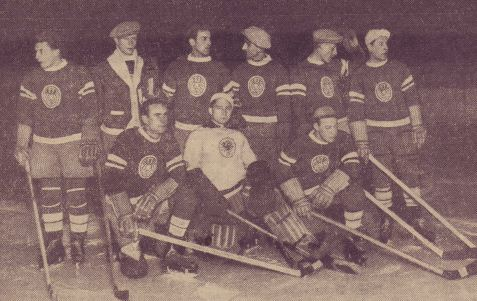
The Austrian national team in 1931.

- Herbert Brück, Friedrich Demmer, Jacques Dietrichstein, Anton Emhardt, Josef Göbl, Bruno Kahane, Karl Kirchberger, Ulrich Lederer, Walter Sell, Hans Tatzer, Hans Trauttenberg, Hermann Weiß

=== Medal table ===
Gold medal	Austria
Silver medal	Poland
Bronze medal	Czechoslovakia
4	Sweden
5	France
5	Romania
7	Great Britain
7	Hungary

- Müller presents the European standings as not including the 'consolation round,' so the placement of the last four nations differ from the 'World' standings.

== Ranking and statistics ==
1931 World Championship winners

Canada
5th title

=== Final standings ===
The final standings of the tournament:

Gold medal	Canada
Silver medal	United States
Bronze medal	Austria
4	Poland
5	Czechoslovakia
6	Sweden
7	Hungary
8	Great Britain
9	France
10	Romania

=== Top scorer ===
- (United States) Charles Ramsay – 8 goals

=== Canadian winning team ===
- George Garbutt, George Hill, Sammy McCallum, Gord McKenzie, Ward McVey, Frank Morris, Jack Pidcock, Art Putee, Blake Watson, Guy Williamson
