= 1929–30 Polska Liga Hokejowa season =

Polish ice hockey season

The 1929–30 Polska Liga Hokejowa season was the fourth season of the Polska Liga Hokejowa, the top level of ice hockey in Poland. Three teams participated in the final round, and AZS Warszawa won the championship.

== First round ==
=== Group A ===
	Club	GP	Goals	Pts
1.	Legia Warszawa	3	13:4	6
2.	Czarni Lwów	3	9:4	4
3.	TKS Toruń	3	6:6	2
4.	KS Cracovia	3	1:15	0

=== Group B ===
	Club	GP	Goals	Pts
1.	Pogoń Lwów	3	7:1	6
2.	AZS Wilno	3	3:4	4
3.	Warta Poznań	3	3:5	1
4.	Polonia Warszawa	3	3:6	1

== Final round ==
	Club	GP	W	T	L	Goals	Pts
1.	AZS Warszawa	2	1	1	0	2:1	3
2.	Pogoń Lwów	2	0	2	0	0:0	2
3.	Legia Warszawa	2	0	1	1	1:2	1

== 4th place ==
- Czarni Lwów – AZS Wilno 1:0
