= Reyschoot =

Reyschoot is a Dutch/Belgian surname. Notable people with the surname include:

- Jacques Van Reysschoot (1905–1975), Belgian Olympic ice hockey player
- Pierre Van Reysschoot (1906–1966), Belgian Olympic ice hockey player
