= 1930–31 Polska Liga Hokejowa season =

Polish ice hockey season

The 1930–31 Polska Liga Hokejowa season was the fifth season of the Polska Liga Hokejowa, the top level of ice hockey in Poland. Four teams participated in the final round, and AZS Warszawa won the championship.

== First round ==
=== Group A ===
	Club	GP	Goals	Pts
1.	Legia Warszawa	3	6:1	6
2.	AZS Poznań	3	2:1	4
3.	KS Cracovia	3	5:7	2
4.	Lechia Lwów	3	2:6	0

=== Group B ===
	Club	GP	Goals	Pts
1.	Pogoń Lwów	3	10:1	6
2.	Czarni Lwów	2	4:4	2
3.	AZS Wilno	3	1:3	2
4.	TKS Toruń	2	1:8	0

=== Qualification for final round ===
- AZS Poznań - Czarni Lwów 7:0

== Final round ==
	Club	GP	Goals	Pts
1.	AZS Warszawa	3	5:1	5
2.	Legia Warszawa	3	2:0	5
3.	AZS Poznań	3	2:4	2
4.	Pogoń Lwów	3	2:6	0

=== Final ===
- AZS Warszawa - Legia Warszawa 1:0
