= 1927–28 Polska Liga Hokejowa season =

Polish ice hockey season

The 1927–28 Polska Liga Hokejowa season was the second season of the Polska Liga Hokejowa, the top level of ice hockey in Poland. Five teams participated in the final round, and AZS Warszawa won the championship.

== Final Tournament ==
	Club	GP	Goals	Pts
1.	AZS Warszawa	4	36:2	8
2.	Legia Warszawa	4	11:10	5
3.	TKS Torun	4	5:17	4
4.	Pogoń Lwów	4	11:8	3
5.	AZS Wilno	4	3:29	0
