= Hans Ertl =

Hans Ertl may refer to:

- Hans Ertl (cameraman) (1908–2000), German mountaineer, cinematographer and cameraman
- Hans Ertl (ice hockey) (1909–1978), Austrian Olympic ice hockey player
