= Sugar propaganda in the Second Polish Republic (1925–1932) =

Polish propaganda campaign

Between 1925 and 1932, a campaign was conducted by the Sugar Consumption Propaganda Commission (Polish: Komisja Propagandy Konsumpcji Cukru; KPKC) and the Bureau of Propaganda for the Consumption of Sugar (Biuro Propagandy Konsumpcji Cukru; BKPC) to increase sugar consumption in Poland. Activities focused on promoting sugar as a source of energy and an essential component of the diet, especially among women, peasants and the intelligentsia. Numerous propaganda materials were introduced, such as posters, leaflets, slogans (such as Cukier krzepi 'Sugar strengthens you'), cooking guides (such as Co będzie na obiad 'What's For Lunch'), as well as radio programmes and press publications.

The campaign also included activities in the Eastern Borderlands, where materials were translated into Ukrainian. Sugar was promoted in the context of preserves, Christmas baked goods and sport, e.g. during the ice hockey match between Poland and Czechoslovakia. At the same time, there was an intensive fight against saccharin, cooperating with the government in this regard, which led to a restriction of its sale. The campaign also included educational games, competitions in schools and actions in scouts to promote sugar among younger audiences.

Despite extensive efforts, the campaign was met with criticism. High sugar prices, its export abroad and controversial slogans Szczypta soli, szczypta cukru ('A pinch of salt, a pinch of sugar') aroused public opposition. In 1938, an additional blow to the propaganda was the results of studies showing that sugar lacked nutritional value and was harmful in excess. The intensity of the activities and the negative image of the sugar cartel further undermined the effectiveness of the campaign, which nevertheless remains one of the greatest examples of consumer propaganda in the Second Polish Republic.

== Campaign (1925–1929) ==
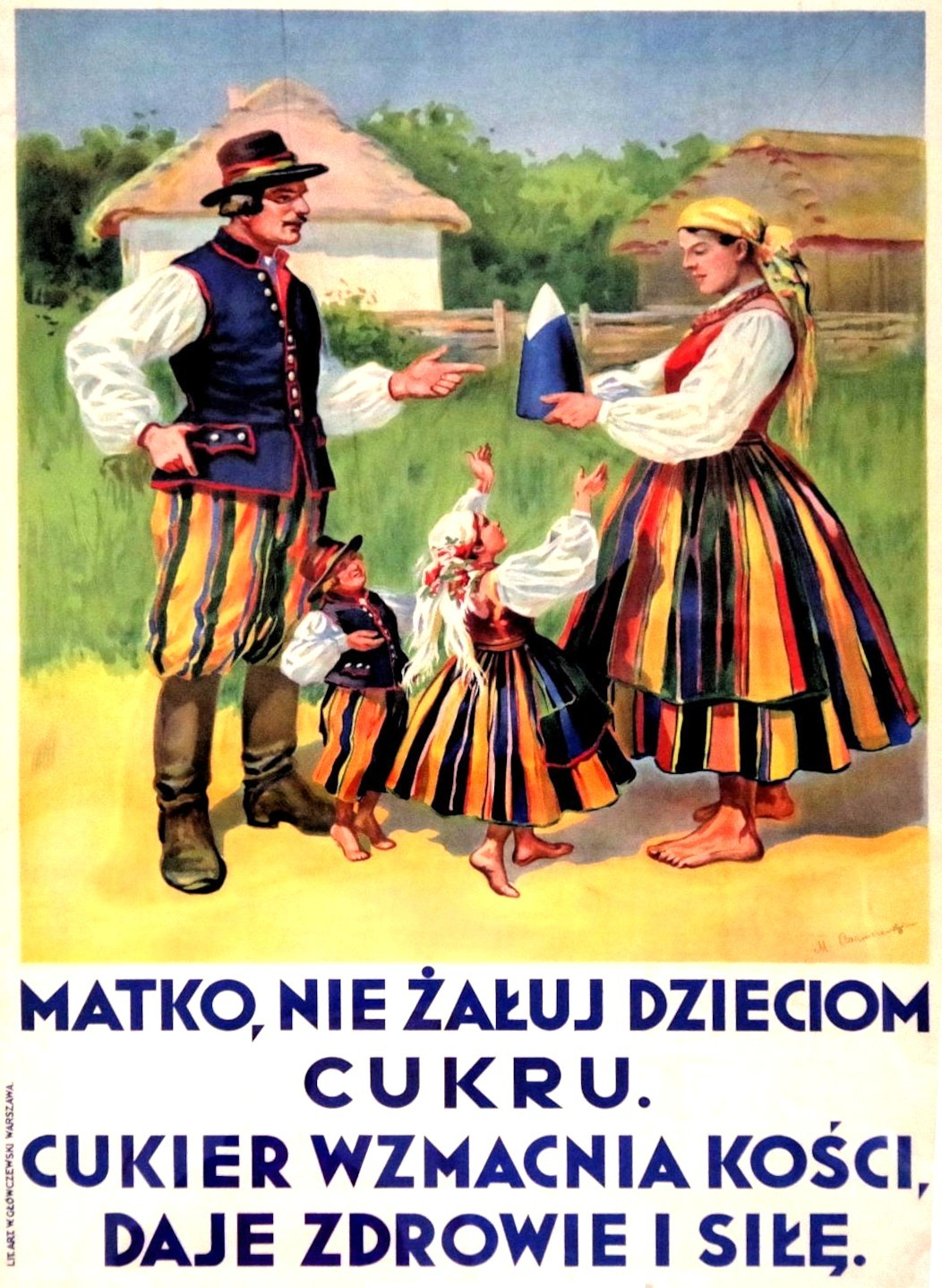
Sugar propaganda poster: 'Mother do not keep sugar away from children. Sugar reinforces bones, gives health and strength.'

In 1925, the Sugar Consumption Propaganda Commission (Polish: Komisja Propagandy Konsumpcji Cukru, KPKC) was established in Second Polish Republic, headed by Hipolit Liciński. The main objective of the commission was to increase sugar consumption through various propaganda activities and cooperation with state institutions. One of the KPKC's tools was the introduction of promotional materials such as leaflets, books and advertising slogans to convince the public to consume more sugar. These materials often featured stories and characters to serve as examples, and the number of propaganda slogans invented was impressive. During this, many works of the type were created: Poradnik dla gospodyń, W jaki sposób otrzymuje się cukier i jakie ma on znaczenie dla człowieka, Cukier i jego własności odżywcze, Co każdy powinien wiedzieć o cukrze. To support sales, the KPKC collaborated with the Sugar Bank, and its actions were inspired by solutions used in other countries.

An important part of the committee's work was the fight against saccharin, considered to be a competitor to sugar. In 1927 a regulation was introduced restricting its sale, and between 1928 and 1929 an intensive anti-saccharin campaign was conducted to discourage the public from using this sweetener. In 1929, further measures were taken, including broadcasts on Polish Radio in which Zygmunt Chybowski presented sugar as an essential component of the daily diet. However, the effectiveness of this medium was limited. There were only 200,000 radio subscribers in Poland at the time, which significantly reduced the reach of the campaign. Sugar was also a luxury product at the time.

Despite the committee's strong commitment, the activities carried out between 1925 and 1929 did not yield the expected results. The problems stemmed from the lack of quality promotional material and underdeveloped propaganda strategies. Even the chairmen of the KRCK admitted that the campaign needed a more sophisticated approach and more effort in creating effective advertising tools. Although many measures were taken, the need for improvement became clear in the following years.

== Campaign (1930–1932) ==
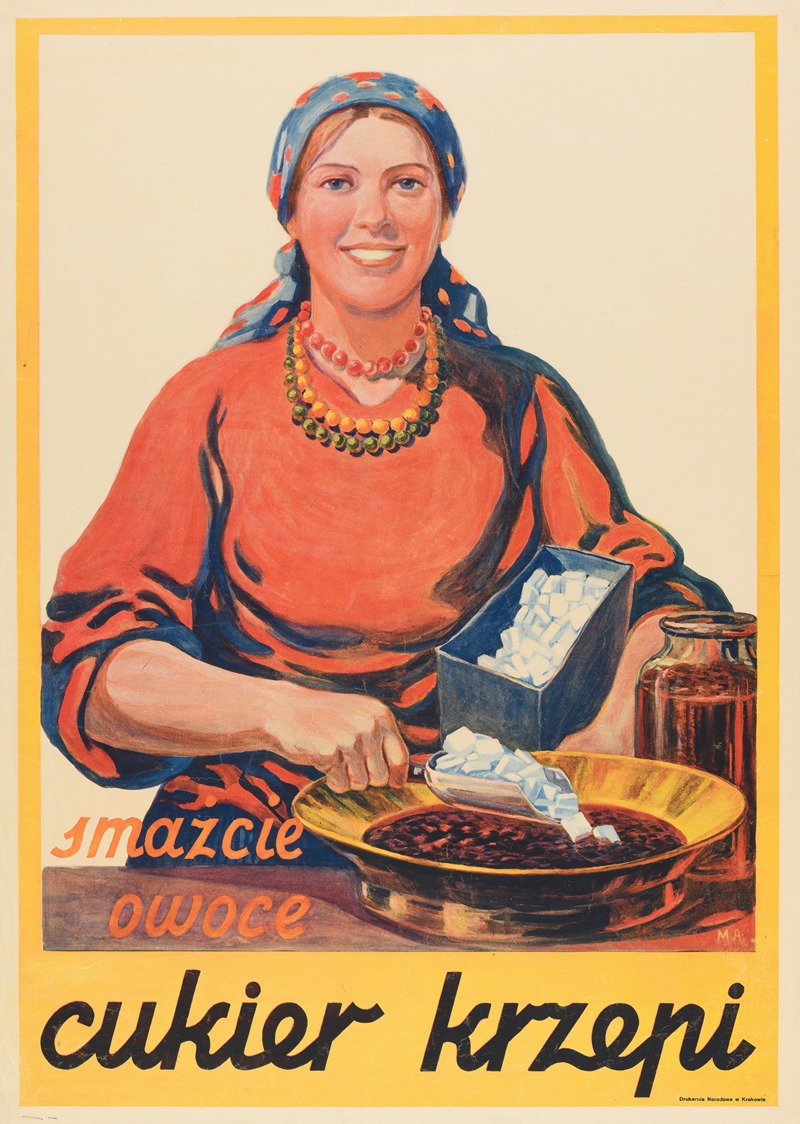
Poster by Marian Adamczewski from 1931. Smażcie owoce ('Fry [your] fruits')

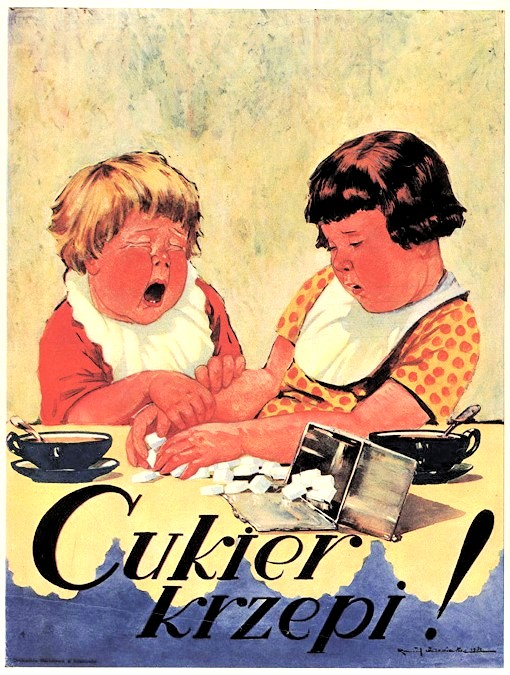
Cukier krzepi poster by Kamil Mackiewicz

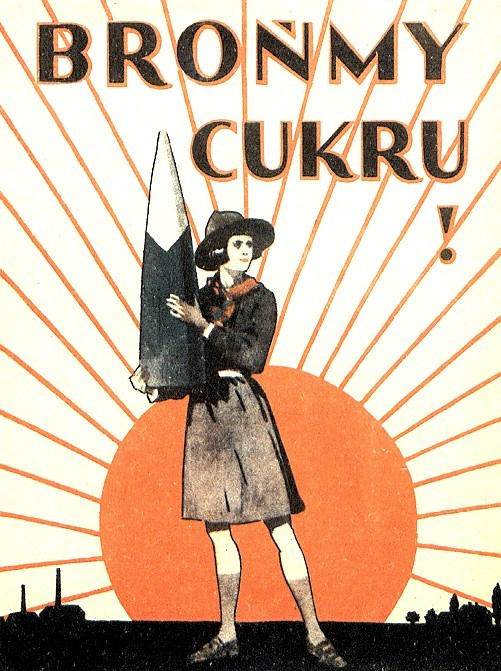
Brońmy cukru (Cover of the 1929 pamphlet 'What Everyone Should Know About Sugar')

In 1930, the KPKC set up a new institution, Bureau of Propaganda for the Consumption of Sugar (Biuro Propagandy Konsumpcji Cukru, BKPC), to organise a more effective promotional campaign. The bureau was headed by Melchior Wańkowicz, a well-known publicist and propagandist at the time. The BKPC's activities were aimed at improving the image of sugar in society and increasing its consumption. Learning from the BKPC's earlier failures, it focused on a wider range of activities, directing the campaign particularly to the Eastern Borderlands, where sugar was also popularised among the Ukrainian minority. Despite the difficult economic situation associated with the Great Depression, the campaign was extensive and conducted with the cooperation of the Polish government. New propaganda tools were introduced, including numerous posters and slogans. The most well-known of these became the slogan Cukier krzepi ('Sugar strengthens [you]'), which quickly gained popularity. Propaganda material was placed in the press, on the radio and on signs and billboards. Slogans promoting sugar and stigmatising saccharin also appeared in Ukrainian, and the fight against saccharin continued as one of the main elements of the campaign.

A novelty in propaganda activities was the use of sport and mass culture to promote sugar. During the ice hockey match between Poland and Czechoslovakia during the World Championships, sugar appeared as a symbol promoted on a large scale. Educational films on sugar were produced, sporting events were organised and sugar-related symbols were even introduced at local celebrations. There were also publications for athletes like Dietetyka w sporcie. Competitions were organised in schools and scouts to convince students and teachers of the value of sugar. One innovative element was the release of board games promoting sugar, which introduced an educational element to the campaign. This involved sending information about sugar and saharin. Also teachers put up posters. These contained poems and songs. The slogans included a call for sugar action, where they criticised the anti-sugar campaign, which had intensified strongly. The activities of the Sugar Consumption Propaganda Bureau were much more comprehensive and effective than the earlier campaigns of the KPKC. Thanks to the diversity of approach and the use of modern tools such as radio, educational games, sports events and multilingual materials, the 1930s campaign went down as a landmark in sugar promotion in Poland.

The main target audience for sugar propaganda in the 1930s was women, based on their role as the people responsible for preparing meals at home. Propaganda campaigns produced numerous educational materials such as cooking instructions and guides, such as Co będzie na obiad ('What's for Lunch?') pamphlet, which portrayed sugar as an essential ingredient for tasty meals. Advertisements emphasised that a meal without sugar loses flavour, and radio broadcasts promoted its benefits. The campaign often referred to the nutritional value of sugar, comparing it with more expensive products such as lard, butter or meat, suggesting that sugar provides a similar amount of calories. Women were also encouraged to use sugar as a means of improving children's health, while men were persuaded that sugar gave them energy to work. One of the popular promotional posters was the slogan Szczypta soli – szczypta cukru, emphasising its necessity in everyday life.

Peasants were another group targeted by propaganda efforts. Campaigns encouraged them to use sugar as a tea supplement, emphasising as with men that sugar provides energy and strength for work. Particular emphasis was placed on promoting the preparation of home-made preserves, adapting the message to the rural lifestyle. Due to the differences in diet between rural and urban areas, where hearty meals were mainly consumed during the festive season, special materials were prepared, such as the brochure Wielkanoc się zbliża, which featured recipes for cakes and pies. The intelligentsia was another important audience for sugar propaganda. In this case, the health benefits of sugar were emphasised, suggesting that its regular consumption could prolong life.

== Criticism and impacts ==
The sugar campaign was met with harsh public and media criticism. Slogans such as Cukier krzepi and Szczypta soli, szczypta cukru were the subject of numerous jokes and mockery, and the intensity of BRKC's propaganda efforts and the diet promoted aroused opposition. The main objection to the campaign was the high price of sugar, which, with the low income of many families, made it a product that was difficult to access. The banner ads supporting the propaganda activities also received negative feedback and their effectiveness was questioned.

Criticism was exacerbated by the results of a 1938 study which showed that sugar had no nutritional value and, in excess, could damage health. Sugar growers were also accused of exporting sugar abroad, which many believed was affecting domestic consumers. The sugar cartel's actions had a bad public image, and the number of criticisms, including from authors and columnists, contributed significantly to the perpetuation of the negative opinion of the industry as a whole.

== Bibliography ==
- Zakrzewska, Zofia (2020). Cukier krzepi. Propaganda konsumpcji cukru w Polsce w latach 1925–1932 (in Polish). Instytut pamięci narodowej. ISBN 978-83-8229-719-5.
