= 1926–27 Polska Liga Hokejowa season =

Polish ice hockey season

The 1926–27 Polska Liga Hokejowa season was the first season of the Polska Liga Hokejowa, the top level of ice hockey in Poland. Three teams participated in the final round, and AZS Warszawa won the championship.

== Qualification ==
- KS Cracovia - Pogoń Lwów 0:3

== Final round ==
	Club	GP	W	T	L	Goals	Pts
1.	AZS Warszawa	2	2	0	0	22:0	4
2.	WTL Warszawa	2	1	0	1	5:8	2
3.	Pogoń Lwów	2	0	0	2	1:20	0
