= Harold Greenwood =

Harold Greenwood may refer to:

- Harold Greenwood (solicitor) (1874–1929), British solicitor tried and acquitted for murdering his wife in 1919
- Harold Greenwood (British Army officer) (1894–1978), Canadian-born British Army officer and ice hockey player
