= Alexander Kowalski =

Alexander Kowalski may refer to:

- Alexander Kowalski (ice hockey) (1902–1940), Polish ice hockey player killed in the Katyn massacre
- Alexander Kowalski (musician) (born 1978), German DJ, electronic music artist
