= Czaplicki =

Czaplicki (feminine: Czaplicka; plural: Czapliccy) is a Polish surname. Notable people with this surname include:

- Agata Czaplicki (born 1983), Swiss swimmer
- Edmund Czaplicki (1904–1940), Polish ice hockey player
- Maria Czaplicka (1884–1921), Polish anthropologist
