= 1928–29 Polska Liga Hokejowa season =

Season of the Polish ice hockey league

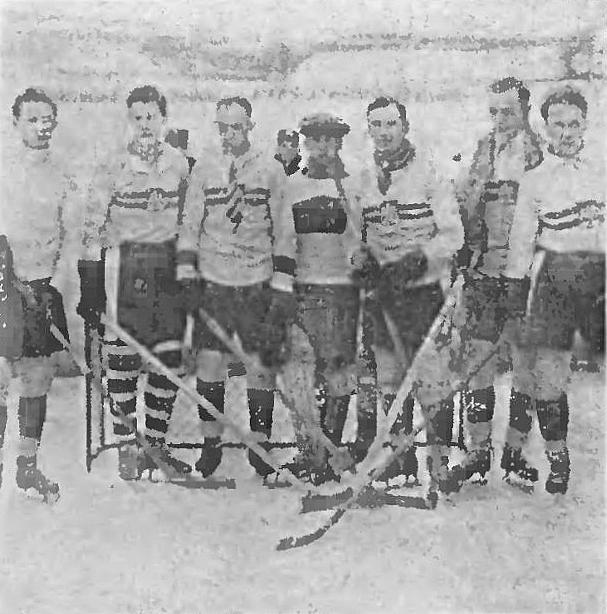
AZS Warsaw team in 1929

The 1928–29 Polska Liga Hokejowa season was the third season of the Polska Liga Hokejowa, the top level of ice hockey in Poland. Six teams participated in the final round, and AZS Warszawa won the championship.

== Final Tournament ==
| | Club | GP | Goals | Pts |
|---|---|---|---|---|
| 1. | AZS Warszawa | 5 | 42:0 | 10 |
| 2. | Pogoń Lwów | 5 | 17:3 | 7 |
| 3. | Legia Warszawa | 5 | 18:9 | 6 |
| 4. | TKS Torun | 5 | 2:10 | 4 |
| 5. | AZS Wilno | 5 | 4:26 | 2 |
| 6. | Wisła Kraków | 5 | 2:37 | 1 |
