= Walter Sachs =

Walter Sachs may refer to:

- Walter E. Sachs (1884–1980), American banker and financier
- Walter Sachs (ice hockey) (1891–?), German ice hockey player
