= Shinwell =

Shinwell:

- Manny Shinwell (1884–1986), a Jewish British trade union official
- Frederick Neville Shinwell Melland (1904–1990), a British ice hockey player
- Shinwell Johnson, a fictional character in Sherlock Holmes stories
