= Philippe Lefebvre =

Philippe Lefebvre may refer to:

- Philippe Lefebvre (actor) (born 1968) French actor
- Philippe Lefebvre (film director) (born 1941), French film director
- Philippe Lefebvre (organist) (born 1949), French church and concert organist
- Philippe Lefebure, also spelled Lefebvre (born 1908), French ice hockey player
