= Hermann Weiss =

Austrian ice hockey player (1909-1979)

- Born: March 17, 1909 Vienna, Austria-Hungary
- Died: May 16, 1979 (aged 70) London, England, U.K.
- Position: Goaltender
- National team: Austria
- Playing career: 1926–1939

Hermann Herbert Maria "Harry" Weiss (March 17, 1909 – May 16, 1979) was an Austrian ice hockey goaltender who played for Wiener EV as well as the Austrian national team. Throughout his career, he took part in several Winter Olympic tournaments and Ice Hockey World Championships.

== Life and career ==
Throughout his career, Weiss represented Austria on the international stage in a remarkable number of prestigious tournaments. He first competed at the 1926 Ice Hockey European Championship, establishing himself as one of the country's most promising goaltenders. Two years later, he was part of the Austrian squad at the 1928 Winter Olympics in St. Moritz. Weiss continued to be a mainstay for the national team throughout the early 1930s, playing at the Ice Hockey World Championships in 1930, 1931, 1933, and 1935. His international career culminated with another Olympic appearance at the 1936 Winter Olympics in Garmisch-Partenkirchen.

Weiss served as the goaltender in all six games for Austria during both the 1928 and 1936 Winter Olympics. Although initially selected for the Austrian squad at the 1924 Winter Olympics, he was pulled from the lineup at the last moment. Following the 1928 Games, Weiss, along with Herbert Klang and Walter Sell, received a ten‑month suspension from the Austrian national team, though the reason for this disciplinary action remains unknown.

His final season as an active player came in 1938–1939, when he joined the Swiss club EHC St. Moritz.

Facing escalating persecution in Austria due to his Jewish heritage, Weiss made the difficult decision to leave his homeland as the political and social climate became increasingly dangerous under Nazis rule. At the start of 1939, he fled Austria and sought refuge in Great Britain.
