= University of Manitoba Grads =

University of Manitoba Grads were a senior men's amateur ice hockey team. They represented Canada at the 1931 World Ice Hockey Championships where they won the gold medal by defeating the United States team (represented by the Boston Hockey Club) by a final score of 2 - 0.

The 1931 University of Manitoba Grads were inducted into the Manitoba Hockey Hall of Fame in the team category.

== Player roster ==
- George Hill
- Gordon MacKenzie
- Sammy McCallum
- Ward McVey
- Frank Morris
- Jack Pidcock
- Art Puttee
- Blake Watson
- Guy "Weary" Williamson
