= Charles Ramsay (ice hockey) =

American ice hockey player

Personal information
- Home town: Springfield, Massachusetts, U.S.

Sport
- Sport: Ice hockey
- Position: Defenseman, Forward
Medal record
Men's Ice hockey
Representing the United States
Ice Hockey World Championships
Silver medal – second place	1931 Krynica

Charles Ramsay, sometimes spelled Charles Ramsey, was an American amateur and professional ice hockey player and coach.

Ramsay was a star in Europe, particularly France, in the 1930s when a new arena-based ice rink, coupled with aggressive marketing by future Boxing Hall of Fame promoter Jeff Dickson, made the sport a popular novelty in Paris.

Ramsay was also a teacher of the game and, in addition to coaching many Parisian youth players of the era, authored a 1933 instructional book simply called Le hockey sur glace (Ice Hockey). It has been credited as the first book devoted entirely to the sport to be published in France.

== International play ==
Ramsay captained the United States national team at the 1931 LIHG World Championships, which marked the country's debut at a standalone World Championship. He led the team in scoring with 5 goals in 6 games.

== Legacy ==
For his contributions to French hockey, the Charles Ramsay Trophy, awarded to the top point scorer in the French league, was named after him.

Ramsay was inducted into the French Ice Hockey Hall of Fame in 2009, as part of its second-ever class.
