= Zsombor Garát =

Hungarian ice hockey player (born 1997)

- Born: 27 July 1997 (age 28) Budapest, Hungary
- Height: 185 cm (6 ft 1 in)
- Weight: 90 kg (198 lb; 14 st 2 lb)
- Position: Defence
- Shoots: Left
- EIHL team Former teams: Nottingham Panthers; Cedar Rapids RoughRiders; MAC Budapest; Worcester Railers
- National team: Hungary
- Playing career: 2015–present

Zsombor Garát (born 27 July 1997) is a Hungarian professional ice hockey player who is a defenceman for the Nottingham Panthers of the Elite Ice Hockey League (EIHL).

He married Hungarian national team defenceman Fanni Gasparics in August 2021.
