= 1932–33 Polska Liga Hokejowa season =

Polish ice hockey season

The 1932–33 Polska Liga Hokejowa season was the sixth season of the Polska Liga Hokejowa, the top level of ice hockey in Poland. Three teams participated in the final round, and Pogon Lwow and Legia Warszawa shared the championship, as they both finished with identical records.

== Final Tournament ==
- Pogoń Lwów - AZS Poznań 2:0
- Legia Warszawa - AZS Poznań 2:1
- Legia Warszawa - Pogoń Lwów 0:0 OT

	Club	GP	W	T	L	Goals	Pts
1.	Pogoń Lwów	2	1	1	0	2:0	3
1.	Legia Warszawa	2	1	1	0	2:1	3
3.	AZS Poznań	2	0	0	2	1:4	0
