= Zoltán Jeney (ice hockey) =

Hungarian ice hockey player (1910–1989)

- Born: 13 May 1910 Budapest, Austria-Hungary
- Died: 7 January 1989 (aged 78) Vienna, Austria
- Position: Right wing
- Shot: Right
- Played for: Budapesti Korcsolyázó Egylet; EHC Arosa
- National team: Hungary
- Playing career: 1928–1941

Zoltán Dionys Avrad Jeney (13 May 1910 — 7 January 1989) was a Hungarian ice hockey player. He played for the Hungarian national team at the 1936 Winter Olympics and several World Championships.
