= László Jakabházy =

Hungarian ice hockey player (1938–2025)

- Born: 14 November 1938; Budapest, Hungary
- Died: 26 March 2025 (aged 86)
- Position: Centre
- Played for: Ferencvárosi TC
- National team: Hungary
- Playing career: 1961–1968

László Jakabházy (14 November 1938 – 26 March 2025) was a Hungarian ice hockey player who played for the Hungary men's national ice hockey team at the 1964 Winter Olympics in Innsbruck.

László began ice skating at three years old. In addition to ice hockey, he played 36 other sports and was a physical education teacher. He participated in ten World Cups and won the Hungarian championships seven times as a player and ten times as a coach. In 2011, he was inducted into the Hungarian Ice Hockey Hall of Fame.

His wife, Mária Mező, served as the secretary general of the Hungarian Olympic Committee. Jakabházy died on 26 March 2025, at the age of 86.
