= Fenerbahçe Women Euroleague 2014–15 =

The 2014–15 season is the 24th edition of Europe's premier basketball tournament for women - EuroLeague Women since it was rebranded to its current format.

== Group stage ==
=== Group B ===
| Pos | Team | Pld | W | L | PF | PA | PD | Pts | FEN | NAD | AVE | BOU | AGU | SCH | TOR | BRN |
|---|---|---|---|---|---|---|---|---|---|---|---|---|---|---|---|---|
| 1 | (Turkey) Fenerbahçe | 14 | 11 | 3 | 1004 | 857 | +147 | 25 | | 65–54 | 66–63 | 75–50 | 73–57 | 68–63 | 76–63 | 79–54 |
| 2 | (Russia) Nadezhda Orenburg | 14 | 10 | 4 | 956 | 825 | +131 | 24 (Note: Head-to-head: 1-1 (+5)) | 64–56 | | 66–50 | 78–68 | 49–53 | 84–74 | 65–63 | 88–55 |
| 3 | (Spain) CB Avenida | 14 | 10 | 4 | 973 | 859 | +114 | 24 (Note: Head-to-head: 1-1 (-5)) | 66–60 | 61–50 | | 59–48 | 71–64 | 75–58 | 70–64 | 73–42 |
| 4 | (France) CJM Bourges Basket | 14 | 9 | 5 | 981 | 875 | +106 | 23 | 67–61 | 58–50 | 73–55 | | 79–71 | 79–67 | 72–54 | 88–38 |
| 5 | (Turkey) Abdullah Gül Üniversitesi | 14 | 7 | 7 | 1004 | 995 | +9 | 21 | 78–84 | 64–71 | 71–63 | 77–73 | | 75–82 | 96–76 | 64–53 |
| 6 | (Italy) PF Schio | 14 | 6 | 8 | 1021 | 1007 | +14 | 20 | 59–75 | 58–77 | 65–90 | 79–59 | 74–80 | | 93–61 | 87–58 |
| 7 | (Poland) Energa Toruń | 14 | 3 | 11 | 940 | 1102 | −162 | 17 | 67–81 | 50–82 | 77–89 | 63–88 | 83–78 | 58–79 | | 79–71 |
| 8 | (Czech Republic) BK Brno | 14 | 0 | 14 | 770 | 1129 | −359 | 14 | 52–85 | 50–78 | 55–88 | 48–79 | 64–76 | 68–83 | 62–82 | |

== Quarterfinals ==
| | Team no. 1 | Agg. | Team no. 2 | Game 1 | Game 2 | Game 3 |
|---|---|---|---|---|---|---|
| 1. | Dynamo Kursk (Russia) | 2 – 1 | (France) CJM Bourges Basket | 75–62 | 62–64 | 88–72 |
| 2. | UMMC Ekaterinburg (Russia) | 2 – 0 | (Russia) Nadezhda Orenburg † | 81–54 | 86–75 | |
| 3. | † CB Avenida (Spain) | 0 – 2 | (Czech Republic) ZVVZ USK Praha | 48–50 | 43–72 | |
| 4. | Fenerbahçe (Turkey) | 2 – 1 | (Turkey) Galatasaray OdeaBank | 58–56 | 57–59 | 63–52 |

== Final four ==
Semi-finals; 10 April
(Turkey) Fenerbahçe | 49
(Czech Republic) ZVVZ USK Praha | 62
(Russia) Dynamo Kursk | 70
(Russia) Ekaterinburg | 81

Final; 12 April
(Czech Republic) ZVVZ USK Praha | 72
(Russia) Ekaterinburg | 68
Third place
(Turkey) Fenerbahçe | 58
(Russia) Dynamo Kursk | 67

=== Semifinal ===
10 April 2015
18:00

Recap

| (Turkey) Fenerbahçe | 49–62 | (Czech Republic) ZVVZ USK Praha |
Scoring by quarter: 18–17, 10–10, 14–18, 7–17
| Pts: T. Charles – 14; Rebs: T. Charles, Q. Hollingsworth – 8 Asts: T. Charles, B. Demirmen – 2 | | Pts: K. Vaughn – 15; Rebs: K. Vaughn – 12; Asts: L. Palau – 7 |

Sportovni Hala Kralovka
Attendance: 2,500
Referees: Jasmina Juras (SRB), Susana Gomez Lopez (ESP), Carole Delauné (FRA)

=== Third-place game ===
12 April
15:00

Recap

| (Russia) Dynamo Kursk | 67–58 | Fenerbahçe (Turkey) |
Scoring by quarter: 18–12, 12–14, 18–16, 19–16
| Pts: N. Ogwumike – 21; Rebs: N. Ogwumike – 14; Asts: S. Augustus – 4 | | Pts: T. Charles – 23; Rebs: Q. Hollingsworth – 11; Asts: B. Demirmen – 2 |

Sportovni Hala Kralovka
Attendance: 2,100
Referees: Anne Panther (GER), Carole Delauné (FRA), Sonia Teixeira (POR)
