= 1937 Ice Hockey World Championships =

1937 edition of the IIHF World Ice Hockey Championship

Tournament details
- Host country: United Kingdom
- Venue(s): Wembley Arena, Harringay Arena
- Dates: 17–27 February
- Teams: 11

Final positions
- Champions: Canada (9th title)
- Runners-up: Great Britain
- Third place: Switzerland
- Fourth place: Germany

Tournament statistics
- Games played: 39
- Goals scored: 224 (5.74 per game)
- Scoring leader: (Canada) Ralph Redding 12 Goals

The 1937 Ice Hockey World Championships were held between February 17 and February 27, 1937, in London, England. Eleven teams took part in this World Championship. Teams from Austria and Czechoslovakia were supposed to be in attendance as well but had issues travelling, and cancelled.

In the preliminary round, the teams were divided into three groups: two groups of four teams and a group with three teams. The top three teams in the groups with four teams and the top two in the group with three teams advanced to the second round. The second round consisted of two groups of four with the top two teams in each group advancing to the final round. The other four teams in the second round played in the consolation round for places 5-8. The three teams that did not advance to the second round were supposed to play off for places 9-11, but first Romania, then both Sweden and Norway decided not to continue playing.

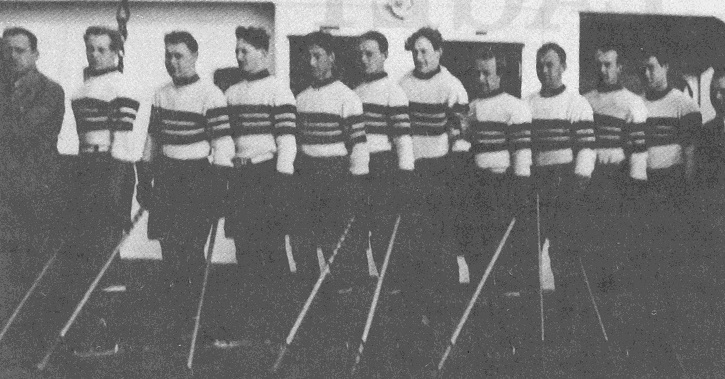
Norway prior to the start of the tournament. Playing in their first international competition, the Norwegians finished ninth.

Canada won its ninth world championship title while the host, Great Britain, won its third European championship. The British team, using many of the players from the previous year's Olympics, won their first seven games by a combined total of forty-five to zero, before losing to Canada. The Swiss team finished third, with their final round losses to Canada and Great Britain both coming in overtime.

== First round ==
=== Group A ===
17. February 1937	London	Hungary	–	Romania	4:1 (2:1,0:0,2:0)
17. February 1937	London	Great Britain	–	Germany	6:0 (1:0,1:0,4:0)
18. February 1937	London	Germany	–	Romania	4:2 (0:0,1:0,3:2)
18. February 1937	London	Great Britain	–	Hungary	7:0 (0:0,2:0,5:0)
19. February 1937	London	Germany	–	Hungary	2:2 (1:0,0:1,1:1)
19. February 1937	London	Great Britain	–	Romania	11:0 (3:0,5:0,3:0)

Standings

Pos.	Team	GP	Wins	Ties	Losses	Goals	Goal Diff.	Pts.
1	Great Britain	3	3	0	0	24: 0	+24	6:0
2	Germany	3	1	1	1	6:10	4	3:3
2	Hungary	3	1	1	1	6:10	4	3:3
4	Romania	3	0	0	3	3:19	-16	0:6

=== Group B ===
17. February 1937	London	Czechoslovakia	–	Norway	7:0 (2:0,3:0,2:0)
18. February 1937	London	Switzerland	–	Norway	13:2 (3:1,6:1,4:0)
19. February 1937	London	Switzerland	–	Czechoslovakia	2:2 (0:0,1:2,1:0)

Standings

Pos.	Team	GP	Wins	Ties	Losses	Goals	Goal Diff.	Pts.
1	Switzerland	2	1	1	0	15: 4	+11	3:1
2	Czechoslovakia	2	1	1	0	9: 2	+ 7	3:1
3	Norway	2	0	0	2	2:20	-18	0:4

=== Group C ===
17. February 1937	London	Poland	–	Sweden	3:0 (0:0,3:0,0:0)
17. February 1937	London	Canada	–	France	12:0 (2:0,5:0,5:0)
18. February 1937	London	France	–	Sweden	2:1 (0:1,1:0,1:0)
18. February 1937	London	Canada	–	Poland	8:2 (3:1,3:0,2:1)
19. February 1937	London	Poland	–	France	7:1 (2:1,3:0,2:0)
19. February 1937	London	Canada	–	Sweden	9:0 (4:0,2:0,3:0)

Standings

Pos.	Team	GP	Wins	Ties	Losses	Goals	Goal Diff.	Pts.
1	Canada	3	3	0	0	29: 2	+27	6:0
2	Poland	3	2	0	1	12: 9	+ 3	4:2
3	France	3	1	0	2	3:20	-17	2:4
4	Sweden	3	0	0	3	1:14	-13	0:6

== Second round ==
=== Group A ===
20. February 1937	London	Germany	–	France	5:0 (1:0,3:0,1:0)
20. February 1937	London	Canada	–	Czechoslovakia	3:0 (0:0,2:0,1:0)
21. February 1937	London	Czechoslovakia	–	France	8:1 (2:1,2:0,4:0)
21. February 1937	London	Canada	–	Germany	5:0 (0:0,3:0,2:0)
22. February 1937	London	Germany	–	Czechoslovakia	2:1 n.V. (0:0,0:1,1:0,0:0,0:0,1:0)
22. February 1937	London	Canada	–	France	13:1 (2:0,4:0,7:1)

Standings

Pos.	Team	GP	Wins	Ties	Losses	Goals	Goal Diff.	Pts.
1	Canada	3	3	0	0	21: 1	+20	6:0
2	Germany	3	2	0	1	7: 6	+ 1	4:2
3	Czechoslovakia	3	1	0	2	9: 6	+ 3	2:4
4	France	3	0	0	3	2:26	-24	0:6

=== Group B ===
20. February 1937	London	Great Britain	–	Switzerland	3:0 (1:0,1:0,1:0)
20. February 1937	London	Poland	–	Hungary	4:0 (1:0,1:0,2:0)
21. February 1937	London	Switzerland	–	Hungary	4:2 (0:1,2:1,2:0)
21. February 1937	London	Great Britain	–	Poland	11:0 (5:0,4:0,2:0)
22. February 1937	London	Great Britain	–	Hungary	5:0 (2:0,2:0,1:0)
22. February 1937	London	Switzerland	–	Poland	1:0 (0:0,1:0,0:0)

Standings

Pos.	Team	GP	Wins	Ties	Losses	Goals	Goal Diff.	Pts.
1	Great Britain	3	3	0	0	19: 0	+19	6:0
2	Switzerland	3	2	0	1	5: 5	0	4:2
3	Poland	3	1	0	2	4:12	-8	2:4
4	Hungary	3	0	0	3	2:13	-11	0:6

== Consolation Round -- 5th to 8th place ==
25. February 1937	London	Hungary	–	France	5:1 (1:0,2:0,2:1)
25. February 1937	London	Czechoslovakia	–	Poland	1:0 (0:0,0:0,1:0)
26. February 1937	London	Czechoslovakia	–	France	3:1 (1:0,1:0,1:1)
27. February 1937	London	Czechoslovakia	–	Hungary	0:0 (0:0,0:0,0:0)

Standings

Pos.	Team	GP	Wins	Ties	Losses	Goals	Goal Diff.	Pts.
5	Hungary	3	2	1	0	10:1	+9	5:1
6	Czechoslovakia	3	2	1	0	4:1	+2	5:1
7	France	3	1	0	2	7:8	-6	2:4
8	Poland	3	0	0	3	0:11	–11	0:6

- Poland forfeited their games against Hungary and France, which are officially viewed as five to nothing losses.

== Final Round – 1st to 4th place ==
25. February 1937	London	Great Britain	–	Switzerland	2:0 n.V. (0:0,0:0,0:0,0:0,0:0,2:0)
25. February 1937	London	Canada	–	Germany	5:0 (1:0,2:0,2:0)
26. February 1937	London	Switzerland	–	Germany	6:0 (2:0,2:0,2:0)
26. February 1937	London	Great Britain	–	Canada	0:3 (0:1,0:1,0:1)
27. February 1937	London	Canada	–	Switzerland	2:1 n.V. (0:1,1:0,0:0,0:0,1:0)
27. February 1937	London	Great Britain	–	Germany	5:0 (3:0,1:0,1:0)

Standings

Pos.	Team	GP	Wins	Ties	Losses	Goals	Goal Diff.	Pts.
1	Canada	3	3	0	0	10: 1	+ 9	6:0
2	Great Britain	3	2	0	1	7: 3	+ 4	4:2
3	Switzerland	3	1	0	2	7: 4	+ 3	2:4
4	Germany	3	0	0	3	0:16	-16	0:6

== Final Rankings – World Championships ==
RF	Team
1	Canada
2	Great Britain
3	Switzerland
4	Germany
5	Hungary
6	Czechoslovakia
7	France
8	Poland
9	Norway
9	Sweden
9	Romania

=== Teams ===
Pos.	Country	Team Members (Kimberley Dynamiters)
1	CAN	Ralph Reading, Harry Robertson, Fred Botterill, T. Almack, James Kemp, Hugo Mackie, Gordon Wilson, Doug Keiver, George Goble, Ken Campbell, Fred Burnett, Paul Kozak, Eric Hornquist; Trainer: John Achtzener

== Final Rankings – European Championships ==
RF	Team
1	Great Britain
2	Switzerland
3	Germany
4	Hungary
5	Czechoslovakia
6	France
7	Poland
8	Norway
8	Sweden
8	Romania

European Champions 1937
Great Britain
