= Gaston Van Volxem =

Belgian ice hockey player

- Born: 24 April 1895 Brussels, Belgium
- Position: Defence
- Played for: CPB, Bruxelles
- National team: Belgium
- Playing career: 1912–1926
Medal record
Representing Belgium
Ice Hockey European Championships
Bronze medal – third place	1914 Berlin	Team

Gaston Louis Van Volxem (born 24 April 1895, date of death unknown) was a Belgian ice hockey player. As part of the national ice hockey team, he won a bronze medal at the 1914 European Championships, and finished fifth and seventh at the 1920 and 1924 Olympics, respectively.
