= Hans Trauttenberg =

Austrian ice hockey player (1909–1985)

- Born: January 6, 1909 Brün, Austria-Hungary
- Died: October 25, 1985 (aged 76) Westminster, England, United Kingdom
- Position: Defense
- Played for: Wiener EV; Streatham
- National team: Austria
- Playing career: ?–?

Baron Hans Heinrich "Dickie" von Trauttenberg (January 6, 1909 – October 25, 1985) was an Austrian ice hockey player who competed for the Austrian national team at the 1936 Winter Olympics in Garmisch-Partenkirchen.

== Playing career ==
Trauttenberg studied at Cambridge University and played for their hockey team during the 1930s, captaining the team in 1931.

One of the top defensemen in Austria at the time, he made 25 appearances for the national team at the World Championships between 1930 and 1935.

In what would be his final international tournament, Trauttenberg captained the Austrian national team at the 1936 Winter Olympics. He was residing in London at the time and played his club hockey with Streatham of the English National League.
