= Wilbert Hurst-Brown =

Canadian physician and ice hockey player

- Born: 24 August 1899; Saskatchewan, Canada
- Died: 4 April 1964 (aged 64)
- Occupation: Physician
Ice hockey career
- Played for: British Olympic team
- National team: United Kingdom

Wilbert Hurst-Brown (24 August 1899 – 4 April 1964) was a Canadian physician and ice hockey player who competed in the 1928 Winter Olympics.

In 1928 he finished fourth with the British team in the Olympic tournament.
