= Albert Collon =

Belgian ice hockey player

Sport
- Sport: Ice hockey
- Position: Left wing
- Club: Le Puck, Antwerpen
Medal record
Representing Belgium
Ice Hockey European Championships
| Silver medal – second place | 1927 Vienna | Team |

Albert Collon was a Belgian ice hockey player. He won a silver medal at the Ice Hockey European Championship 1927, and finished fifth at the 1928 Winter Olympics.
