= Jacques Dietrichstein =

Austrian ice hockey player

- Born: 20 September 1906; Focșani, Romania
- Died: 23 May 1998 (aged 91); Cheshire, Wales, U.K.
- Position: Defence
- National team: Austria
- Playing career: 1923–1935

Jacques Georg Dietrichstein (20 September 1906 – 23 May 1998) was an Austrian ice hockey player. He competed in the men's tournament at the 1928 Winter Olympics. During the 1920s and the 1930s, Dietrichstein took part in two European Championships and four World Championships, playing a total of 25 matches for his country. He was part of the Austrian team that won gold at the 15th European Championship in 1931. He also developed ice hockey in Kitzbühel during the 1930s.
