= Aleksander Słuczanowski =

Polish ice hockey player

- Born: 13 September 1900 Stavropol, Russian Empire
- Died: 11 September 1942 (aged 41)
- Position: Defence
- Played for: AZS Warszawa
- National team: Poland
- Playing career: 1924–1931

Aleksander Słuczanowski (13 September 1900 – 11 September 1942) was a Polish ice hockey defenceman.

== Career ==
During his career, Słuczanowski played for AZS Warszawa. He won the Polish league championship three times, from 1927 until 1929. Słuczanowski played for the Polish national team, including the first international match for Poland in December 1924, and later played at the 1928 Winter Olympics. He was killed during World War II.
