= Béla Ordódy =

Hungarian sportsperson (1880–1955)

- Born: 13 January 1880 Budapest, Austria-Hungary
- Died: 28 November 1955 (aged 75) Budapest, Hungary
- Position: Goaltender
- National team: Hungary
- Playing career: c. 1927–c. 1928

Béla Ordódy (13 January 1880 – 28 November 1955) was a Hungarian football and ice hockey player. He played for the Hungary national team at the 1928 Winter Olympics.
