= Gyula Szepes =

Hungarian cross-country skier (1899–1985)

Personal information
- Nationality: Hungarian
- Born: 18 August 1899; Spišská Nová Ves, Austria-Hungary
- Died: 2 March 1985 (aged 85); Budapest, Hungary

Sport
- Sport: Cross-country skiing

Gyula Szepes (18 August 1899 – 2 March 1985) was a Hungarian cross-country skier. He competed in the men's 18 kilometre event at the 1928 Winter Olympics.
