= Béla Weiner =

Hungarian ice hockey player (1896–1979)

- Born: 4 September 1896
- Died: August 1979 (aged 82)
- Position: Left wing
- Played for: Budapesti Korcsolyázó Egylet
- National team: Hungary
- Playing career: 1925–1935

Béla Weiner (4 September 1896 – August 1979) was a Hungarian ice hockey player. He played for the Hungarian national team at the 1928 Winter Olympics and several World Championships.
