= John Rogers (ice hockey, born 1910) =

British ice hockey player

Personal information
- Nationality: British
- Born: 22 August 1910; Alexandria, Egypt

Sport
- Sport: Ice hockey

George Edward Frederick Rogers (born 22 August 1910, date of death unknown) was a British ice hockey player. He competed in the men's tournament at the 1928 Winter Olympics.

Rogers played as a goaltender and shared duties in the Olympic squad with the more experienced William Speechly.

== Biography ==
Rogers was born in Alexandria, Egypt and was the son of a Liverpool cotton broker, who was managing the Egyptian end of his business at the time of his son's birth.

He attended Lyceum Alpinum Zuoz, a Swiss boarding school where ice hockey is one of the main sports.
