= David Meyer (ice hockey) =

Belgian ice hockey player

Sport
- Sport: Ice hockey
- Position: Right wing
- Club: Le Puck, Antwerpen
Medal record
Representing Belgium
Ice Hockey European Championships
Silver medal – second place	1927 Vienna	Team

David Meyer was a Belgian ice hockey player. He won a silver medal at the Ice Hockey European Championship 1927, and finished fifth at the 1928 Winter Olympics.
