= Péter Krempels =

Hungarian ice hockey player (1897–1978)

- Born: 17 September 1897; Budapest, Austria-Hungary
- Died: February 1978 (aged 80); Budapest, Hungary
- Position: Forward
- Played for: Budapesti Korcsolyázó Egylet
- National team: Hungary
- Playing career: 1923–1930

Péter Krempels (17 September 1897 – February 1978) was a Hungarian ice hockey player. He played for the Hungarian national team at the 1928 Winter Olympics.
