= Kazimierz Żebrowski =

Polish ice hockey player

- Born: 4 March 1891; Warsaw, Russian Empire
- Died: 1940 (aged 48–49)
- Position: Defence
- Played for: AZS Warszawa
- National team: Poland
- Playing career: 1922–1931

Kazimierz Żebrowski (4 March 1891 – 1940) was a Polish ice hockey player. One of the earliest ice hockey players in Poland, he helped form the team at AZS Warszawa in 1922, and played with them during his career. Żebrowski won the Polish league championship five years in a row from 1927 to 1931 with AZS Warszawa, and played for the Polish national team at the 1928 Winter Olympics. He died during the Second World War, though an exact date is unknown.
