= Hector Chotteau =

Belgian ice hockey player

Personal information
- Born: 24 May 1898 Laeken, Belgium
- Died: 1 December 1985 (aged 87) Brussels, Belgium

Sport
- Sport: Ice hockey
- Position: Goaltender
- Club: CPA, Antwerpen
Medal record
Representing Belgium
Ice Hockey European Championships
Bronze medal – third place	1924 Milan	Team
Silver medal – second place	1927 Vienna	Team

Hector Chotteau (24 May 1898 – 1 December 1985) was a Belgian ice hockey player. He won two medals at the Ice Hockey European Championships in 1924 and 1927, and finished fifth at the 1928 Winter Olympics.
