= István Krepuska =

Hungarian ice hockey player (1899–1978)

- Born: 8 August 1899; Budapest, Austria-Hungary
- Died: 14 March 1978 (aged 78); Budapest, Hungary
- Position: Defence
- Played for: Budapesti Korcsolyázó Egylet
- National team: Hungary
- Playing career: 1927–1931

István Krepuska (8 August 1899 — 14 March 1978) was a Hungarian ice hockey player. He played for the Hungarian national team at the 1928 Winter Olympics and several World Championships.
