= Jacques Van Reysschoot =

Belgian ice hockey player

Personal information
- Born: 2 May 1905 Ghent, Belgium
- Died: 1975 (aged 69–70) Spain

Sport
- Sport: Ice hockey
Medal record
Representing Belgium
Ice Hockey European Championships
| Silver medal – second place | 1927 Vienna | Team |

Jacques Van Reysschoot (2 May 1905 – 1975) was a Belgian ice hockey player. He won a silver medal at the Ice Hockey European Championship 1927, and finished fifth at the 1928 Winter Olympics.
