= Jean Van Der Wouwer =

Belgian ice hockey player

Personal information
- Nationality: Belgian
- Born: 1910

Sport
- Sport: Ice hockey

Jean Van Der Wouwer (born 1910, date of death unknown) was a Belgian ice hockey player. He competed in the men's tournament at the 1928 Winter Olympics.
