= Jean Meeus (ice hockey) =

Belgian ice hockey player

Personal information
- Nationality: Belgian
- Born: 3 June 1905

Sport
- Sport: Ice hockey
- Position: Left wing

Jean Meeus (born 3 June 1905, date of death unknown) was a Belgian ice hockey player. He competed in the men's tournament at the 1928 Winter Olympics.
