= Marco Peltzer =

Belgian ice hockey player

Personal information
- Nationality: Belgian
- Born: 18 November 1909; Eupen, Belgium
- Died: 18 March 1983 (aged 73); Brussels, Belgium

Sport
- Sport: Ice hockey

Marco-Paul Peltzer (18 November 1909 – 18 March 1983) was a Belgian ice hockey player. He competed in the men's tournament at the 1928 Winter Olympics.
