= Hans Ertl (ice hockey) =

Austrian ice hockey player

- Born: 30 January 1909 Vienna, Austria-Hungary
- Died: July 17, 1978 (aged 69) Steyr, Austria
- Position: Left wing
- National team: Austria
- Playing career: 1927–1943

Johann Baptiste Nikolaus Ertl (30 January 1909 – 17 July 1978) was an Austrian ice hockey player who competed in the 1928 Winter Olympics.

In 1928 he participated with the Austrian ice hockey team in the Olympic tournament.
