= Willy Kreitz =

Belgian ice hockey player and sculptor

Personal information
- Born: 21 September 1903 Antwerp, Belgium
- Died: 3 July 1982 (aged 78) Uccle, Brussels, Belgium

Sport
- Sport: Ice hockey
- Position: Right winger
Medal record
Representing Belgium
Ice Hockey European Championships
Bronze medal – third place	1924 Milan	Team
Silver medal – second place	1927 Vienna	Team

Wilhelm "Willy" Kreitz (21 September 1903 – 3 July 1982) was a Belgian ice hockey player and sculptor.

== Career as sportsman ==
He won two medals at the Ice Hockey European Championships in 1924 and 1927, and finished 5th and 13th at the 1928 and 1936 Winter Olympics, respectively. He was also present at the 1924 Olympics as a substitute player. At the 1927 European Championships Kreitz was the team captain and top scorer (7 goals in 5 games), and was selected as best player of the tournament.

== Career as artist ==
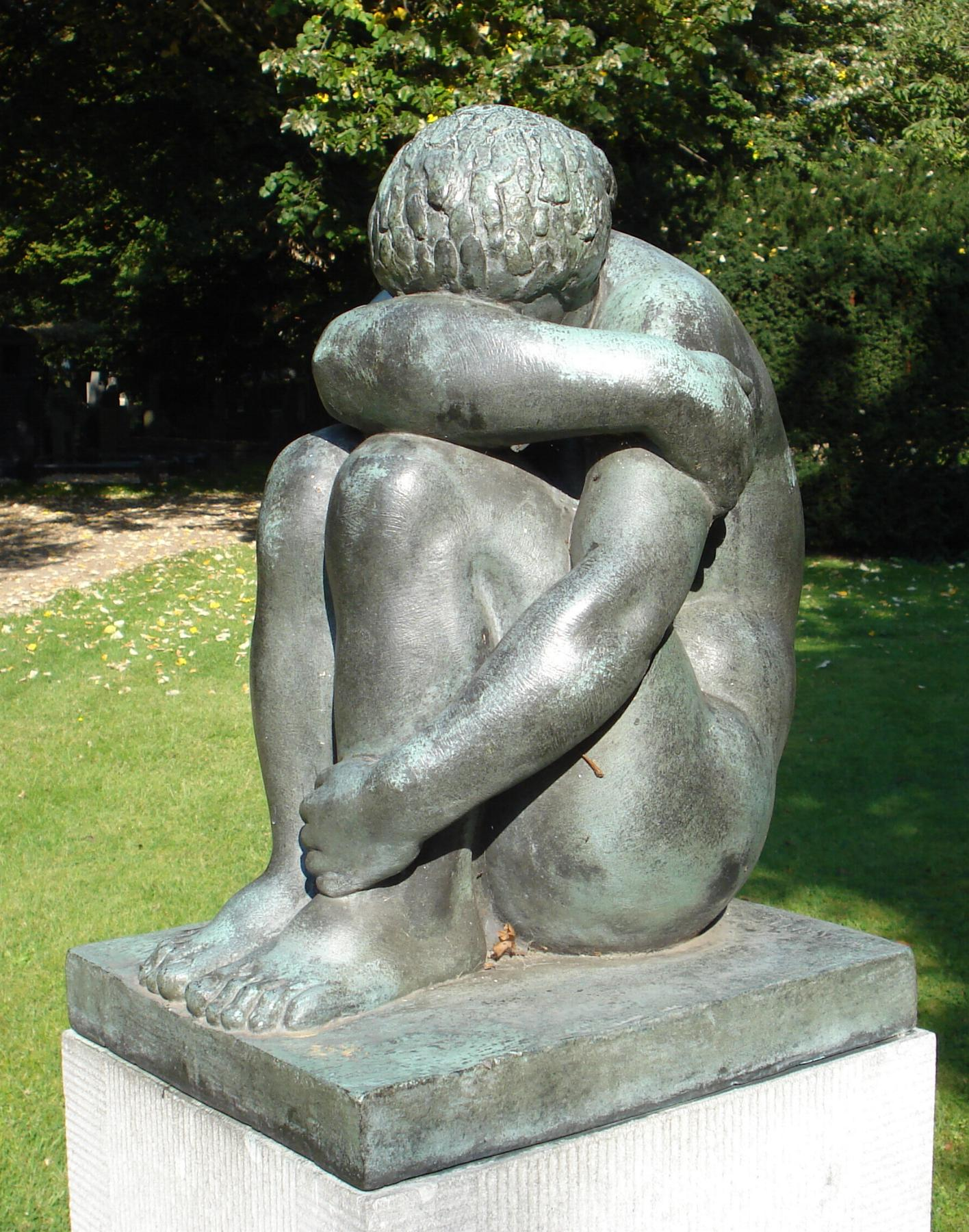
The sad woman by Kreitz (1965) in Vlaardingen, the Netherlands

Kreitz studied traditional sculpture at the Royal Academy of Fine Arts in Antwerp and created statues and portrait busts for numerous public spaces in Belgium and the Netherlands. He won the Van Leriusprijs and the Prixe de Rome (1932), and took part in the art competitions at the 1936 Summer Olympics. After that he taught sculpture at the Antwerp Academy.
