= Guillaume Hoorickx =

Belgian ice hockey player and painter

Personal information
- Nationality: Belgian
- Born: 12 April 1900
- Died: 31 October 1983 (aged 83)

Sport
- Sport: Ice hockey
- Position: Centre

Guillaume Hoorickx otherwise Willem Hoorickx (12 April 1900 – 31 October 1983) was a Belgian ice hockey player. He competed in the men's tournament at the 1928 Winter Olympics. During World War II, he worked as an agent for Victor Sukolov in the Red Orchestra network. He was imprisoned in the Mauthausen-Gusen concentration camp.

He was also an artist, under the name Bill Orix. A collection of his works is held by the Royal Museums of Fine Arts of Belgium.

== See also ==
- People of the Red Orchestra
