= François Franck =

Belgian ice hockey player

- Born: 14 September 1904 Belgium
- Died: 6 August 1965 (aged 60)
- Height: 6 ft 3 in (191 cm)
- Position: Defence
- National team: Belgium
- Playing career: 1922–1935
Medal record
Ice Hockey European Championships
Bronze medal – third place	1924 Milan	Team

François Franck (14 September 1904 – 6 August 1965) was a Belgian ice hockey player. He won a bronze medal at the 1924 Ice Hockey European Championships, and finished seventh and fifth at the 1924 and 1928 Winter Olympics, respectively.
