= Ulrich Lederer =

Austrian ice hockey player

Personal information
- Nationality: Austrian
- Born: 18 August 1897 Opava, Austria-Hungary
- Died: 3 June 1969 (aged 71)

Sport
- Sport: Ice hockey

Ulrich Lederer (18 August 1897 – 3 June 1969) was an Austrian ice hockey player. He competed in the men's tournament at the 1928 Winter Olympics.
