= Herbert Klang =

Austrian ice hockey player

Personal information
- Nationality: Austrian
- Born: 1908 Vienna, Austria-Hungary

Sport
- Sport: Ice hockey

Herbert Klang (born 1908, date of death unknown) was an Austrian ice hockey player. He competed in the men's tournament at the 1928 Winter Olympics. Klang also won ten caps for the national team, and played at the 1929 Ice Hockey European Championship.
