= Roger Bureau =

Belgian speed skater and ice hockey player

Personal information
- Born: 1 February 1905 Antwerp, Belgium
- Died: c. 11 April 1945 (aged 40) Hanover, Nazi Germany

Sport
- Sport: Ice hockey
Medal record
Representing Belgium
Ice Hockey European Championships
Silver medal – second place	1927 Vienna	Team

Roger Eugene Bureau (1 February 1905 – c. 11 April 1945) was a Belgian speed skater and ice hockey player. As a speed skater he finished seventh at the 1926 European Championships. As a hockey player he won a silver medal at the Ice Hockey European Championship 1927, and finished fifth and 13th at the 1928 and 1936 Winter Olympics, respectively. During World War II Bureau served with the Allied forces. On 21 April 1944 he was arrested near the French-Spanish border, placed in a German prison camp, and executed in April 1945.
