= Sepp Göbl =

Austrian ice hockey player (1905-1971)

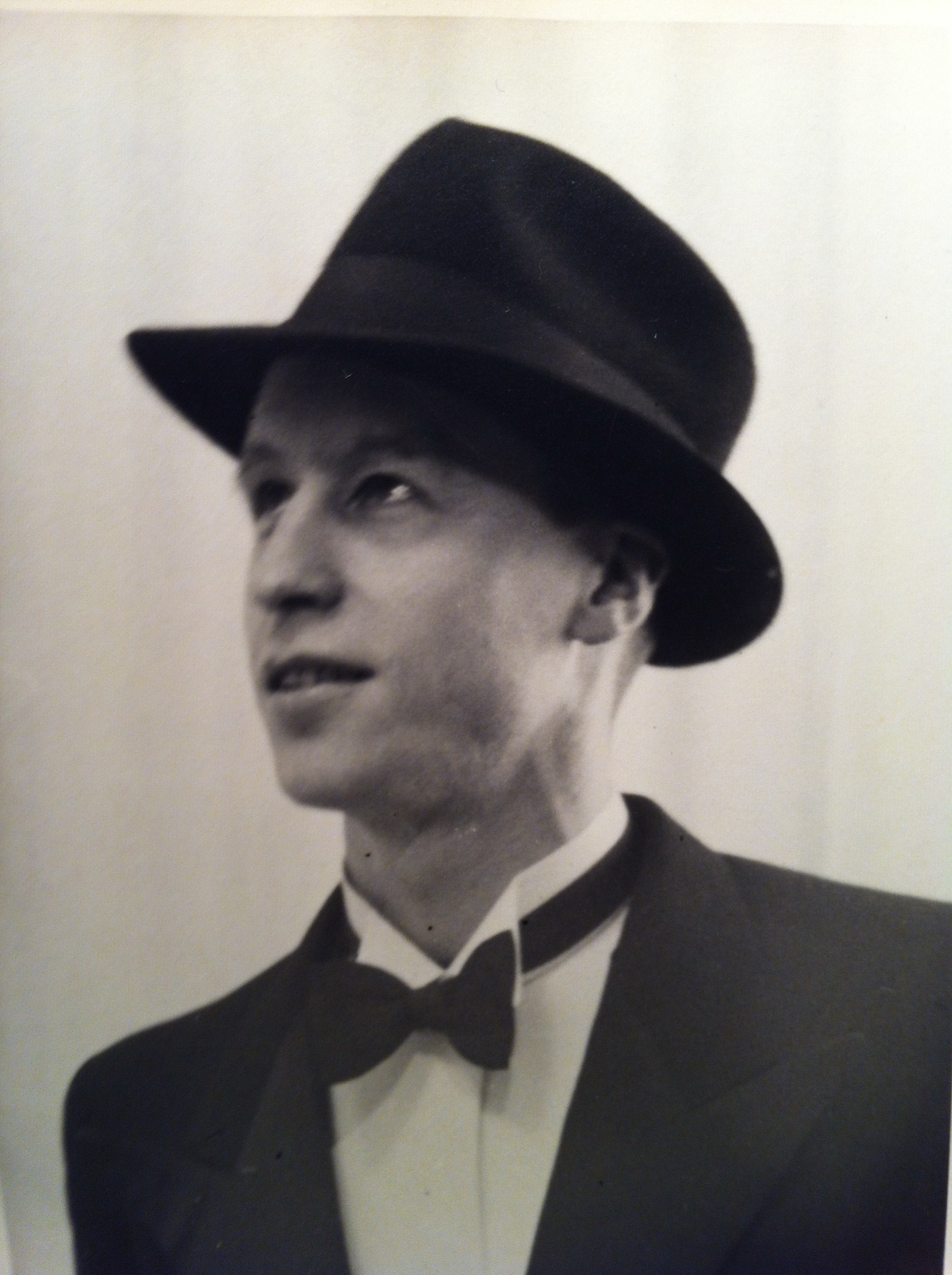
- Born: 11 June 1905 Vienna, Austria-Hungary
- Died: September 7, 1971 (aged 66)
- Position: Centre
- Played for: Wiener EV; EK Engelmann Wien
- National team: Austria
- Playing career: 1923–1943

Josef Artur "Sepp" Göbl (11 June 1905 – September 7, 1971) was an Austrian ice hockey player who competed for the Austrian national team at the 1928 Winter Olympics in Saint-Moritz and the 1936 Winter Olympics in Garmisch-Partenkirchen.

He became the manager of an ice rink in The Hague, Netherlands, in 1937.

== Playing career ==
Domestically, Göbl played for Wiener EV and EK Engelmann Wien in the Austrian Hockey Championship.

He made 22 appearances for the Austrian national team at the World Championships between 1930 and 1935. Göbl also represented his country at the Olympics in 1928 and 1936.
