= Harold Greenwood (British Army officer) =

Canadian-British ice hockey player

- Born: Harold Gustave Francis Greenwood; 15 November 1894; Peterborough, Ontario, Canada
- Died: 8 July 1978 (aged 83); Buckingham, Buckinghamshire, Great Britain
- Relatives: Henri-Gustave Joly de Lotbinière (grandfather)
Ice hockey career
- Played for: British Olympic team (1928)
- National team: United Kingdom
- Military career
- Allegiance: United Kingdom
- Branch: Royal Engineers
- Rank: Chief Engineer
- Unit: Western Command
- Conflicts: World War I, World War II
- Awards: Commander of the Order of the British Empire

Harold Gustave Francis Greenwood CBE MC (15 November 1894, Peterborough – 8 July 1978, Buckingham) was a Canadian-British military engineer and an ice hockey player who competed in the 1928 Winter Olympics.

== Biography ==
Greenwood was the grandson of Henri-Gustave Joly de Lotbinière and graduated from the Royal Military College of Canada in 1914. He moved to Europe during World War I, and in World War II served as a brigadier in the Corps of Royal Engineers in India, Sri Lanka, and southeast Asia. In 1945, he became Chief Engineer of the Western Command and was appointed Commander of the Order of the British Empire. He retired in 1947.

In 1928 he finished fourth with the British team in the Olympic tournament.

== Personal life ==
Greenwood married Gwyneth Lemon from Winnipeg on 12 April 1928 at the British Embassy Church in Paris.
