= Walter Sachs (ice hockey) =

German ice hockey player

- Born: October 23, 1892 Berlin, German Empire
- Died: October 6, 1946 (aged 53)
- Position: Defence
- Played for: Berliner Schlittschuh-Club
- National team: Germany
- Playing career: 1910–1930

Walter Sachs (b. October 23, 1892 - d. October 6, 1946) is a former German ice hockey player. Sachs played on the Germany men's national ice hockey team at the 1928 Winter Olympics.
