= Herbert Brück =

Austrian ice hockey player

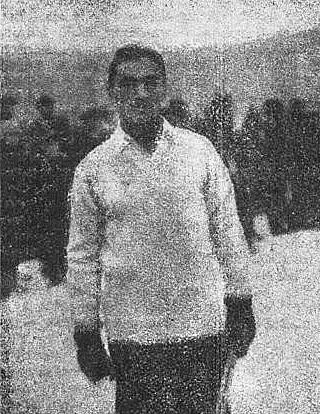
- Born: 13 January 1900; Berlin, German Empire
- Died: 9 April 1974 (aged 74); Kihei, Hawaii, U.S.
- Position: Centre
- National team: Austria
- Playing career: 1918–1933

Herbert Israel Brück (b. 13 January 1900 - d. 9 April 1974) was an Austrian ice hockey player. He competed in the men's tournament at the 1928 Winter Olympics. During World War II, he was interned at the Sachsenhausen concentration camp and survived.
