= Frederick Melland =

British ice hockey player (1904–1990)

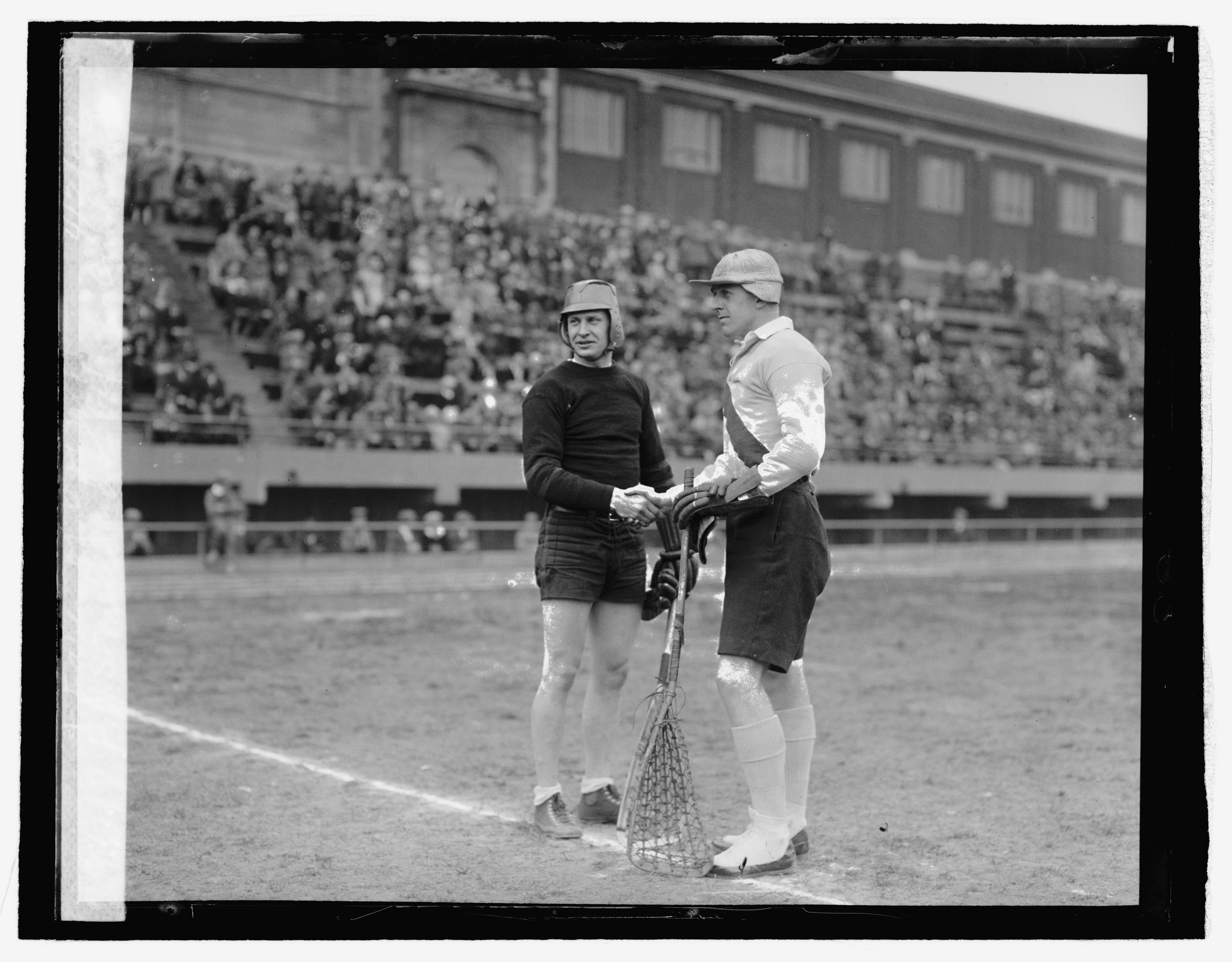
- Melland and Jack Faber (1926)
- Born: Frederick Neville Shinwell Melland; 3 April 1904; Manchester, England
- Died: 7 December 1990 (aged 86); Swansea, Wales
- Education: Winchester College; Trinity College, Oxford
- Relatives: H. H. Asquith (uncle); Raymond Asquith (cousin); Herbert Asquith (cousin); Arthur Asquith (cousin); Violet Bonham Carter (cousin); Cyril Asquith (cousin); Elizabeth Bibesco (cousin); Anthony Asquith (cousin)
Ice hockey career
- Position: Centre
- Played for: Oxford University (1924-1926); British national team (1925-1934); British Olympic team (1928); London Lions (1928-1933); Manchester (1933-1934); Richmond Hawks (1934-1935)
- National team: United Kingdom

Frederick Neville Shinwell Melland (3 April 1904 in Manchester – 7 December 1990, Swansea) was a British lacrosse and ice hockey player who competed in the 1928 Winter Olympics.

== Biography ==
Melland attended Winchester College and Trinity College, Oxford, where he played lacrosse. He toured the US in 1926 and captained the England lacrosse team in 1932. Additionally, he was part of the British national ice hockey team that finished fourth in the 1928 Olympics. He also played tennis, making the mixed doubles at Wimbledon in 1936 and the semi-finals of the men's doubles in the Northern Tournament in 1940.

Melland was later a lacrosse referee. He was the nephew of Prime Minister H. H. Asquith.
