= Philippe Lefebure =

French ice hockey player

Personal information
- Nationality: French
- Born: 18 June 1908 Sannois, France
- Died: 5 June 1973 (aged 64) Toulon, France

Sport
- Sport: Ice hockey

Philippe Lefebure (18 June 1908 – 5 June 1973) was a French ice hockey player. He competed in the men's tournament at the 1928 Winter Olympics.
