= Pierre Van Reysschoot =

Belgian ice hockey player

Personal information
- Born: 9 December 1906 Ghent, Belgium
- Died: 9 October 1966 (aged 59)

Sport
- Sport: Ice hockey
Medal record
Representing Belgium
Ice Hockey European Championships
Silver medal – second place	1927 Vienna	Team

Pierre Van Reysschoot (9 December 1906 – 9 October 1966) was a Belgian ice hockey player. He won a silver medal at the Ice Hockey European Championship 1927, and finished 5th and 13th at the 1928 and 1936 Winter Olympics, respectively.
