= Hans Tatzer =

Austrian ice hockey player (1905-1944)

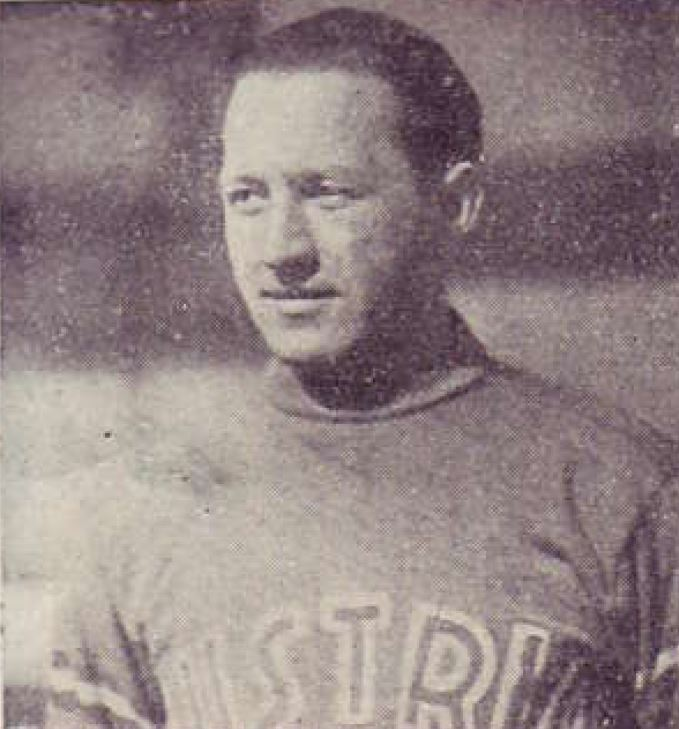
- Born: 25 May 1905 Vienna, Austria
- Died: 23 August 1944 (aged 39) Marseille, France
- Position: Left wing
- Played for: EK Engelmann Wien
- National team: Austria
- Playing career: 1926–1938

Johann Robert "Hans" Tatzer (25 May 1905 – 23 August 1944) was an Austrian ice hockey player who competed for the Austrian national team at the 1928 Winter Olympics in Saint-Moritz and the 1936 Winter Olympics in Garmisch-Partenkirchen.

Tatzer was killed in August 1944 while serving in France as a member of the German forces.

== Playing career ==
Tatzer made a total of 86 appearances for the Austrian national team between 1926 and 1938, the most ever during the pre-World War II era. He won the European Championship with Austria in 1927 and 1931. At the World Championships, Tatzer played 31 games between 1930 and 1938, scoring 15 goals. He also represented his country at the Winter Olympics in 1928 and 1936.

Tatzer first played club hockey for the Lehrer Sportvereinigung, based in Vienna. He then joined Pötzleinsdorfer SK, for whom he played until the end of the 1929-30 season. Tatzer then went on to serve as the player-coach for the Polizeisportvereinigung Wien, before returning to Pötzleinsdorfer SK for the 1931-32 season. The club renamed itself EK Engelmann Wien after winning the Austrian Hockey Championship in 1932.

He competed as a guest player for Wiener EV during their 1937 tour of South Africa. Spanning from June 24 to July 15, the purpose of the visit was to commemorate the opening of the Johannesburg Ice Palace. Wiener EV played eight games against various South African selections over the course of the tour.

A multi-talented sportsman, Tatzer was also a skilled handball, football, and field hockey player. He was a member of the Austrian national handball team in 1934.
