= Edmund Czaplicki =

Polish ice hockey player

Personal information
- Born: 30 October 1904 Warsaw, Poland
- Died: August 1940 (aged 35) Kharkiv, Soviet Union

Sport
- Sport: Ice hockey
- Position: Goaltender
- Team: AZS Warsaw

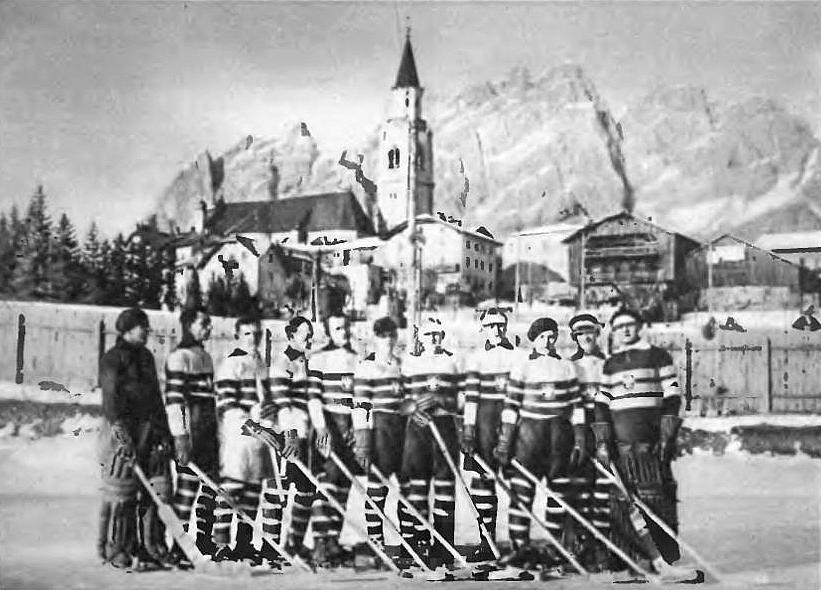
The Polish Olympic team for the 1928 Winter Games in St. Moritz (Czaplicki in the far left)

Edmund Czaplicki (30 October 1904 – August 1940) was a Polish ice hockey player who competed in the 1928 Winter Olympics.

== Career ==
Czaplicki began his career with AZS Warsaw in 1925. At the 1928 Winter Olympics, he was a member of the Polish ice hockey team. During World War II, he was imprisoned by the NKVD in Starobielsk, and later executed in Kharkiv.
