= Walter Sell =

Austrian ice hockey player

Personal information
- Nationality: Austrian
- Born: October 4, 1906 Vienna, Austria-Hungary
- Died: April 30, 1966 (aged 59) Graz, Austria

Sport
- Sport: Ice hockey

Walter Karl Arthur Sell (October 4, 1906 – April 30, 1966) was an Austrian ice hockey player. He competed in the men's tournament at the 1928 Winter Olympics.
