= Aleksander Kowalski (ice hockey) =

Polish ice hockey player (1902–1940)

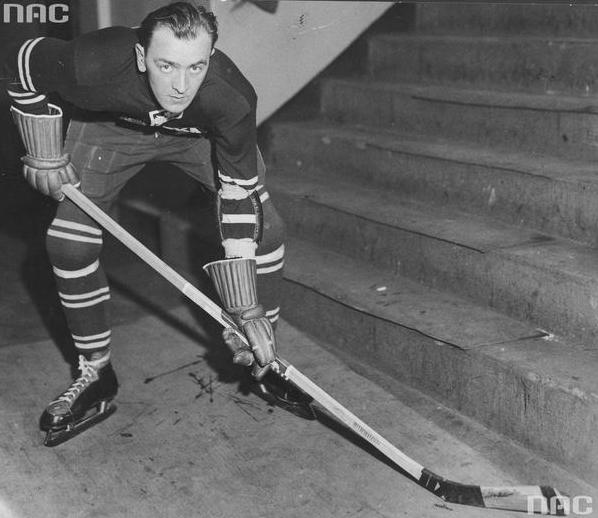
- Born: 7 October 1902; Warsaw, Poland
- Died: April 1940 (aged 37); Katyn, Poland
Ice hockey career
- Played for: Polish Olympic team (1928 and 1932)
- National team: Poland

Aleksander Marek Kowalski (7 October 1902 – 4-7 April 1940) was a Polish ice hockey defenceman who competed in the 1928 Winter Olympics and in the 1932 Winter Olympics.

== Biography ==
He was born in Warsaw, Poland and was killed in the Katyn massacre, aged 37. His family received the last postcard on 11 February 1940. His exact date of death is unknown, but he was on the list of the NKVD dated 3 April 1940.

In 1928 he participated with the Polish ice hockey team in the Olympic tournament.

Four years later he was a member of the Polish team which finished fourth in the 1932 Olympic tournament. He played all six matches and scored two goals. This made him the top scorer for the team, scoring two out of the team's three goals
