= Hungary men's national ice hockey team =

Men's national ice hockey team representing Hungary

Hungary
- Nickname: Magyars (Hungarians)
- Association: Hungarian Ice Hockey Federation
- General manager: Attila Kovács; Attila Nagy
- Head coach: Gergely Majoross
- Assistants: Balázs Bartalis; Dávid Kiss; Zoltán Szilassy; Viktor Tokaji
- Captain: Csanád Erdély
- Most games: István Sofron (275)
- Top scorer: István Sofron (119)
- Most points: Balázs Ladányi (251)
- Home stadium: László Papp Budapest Sports Arena
- Team colors
- IIHF code: HUN
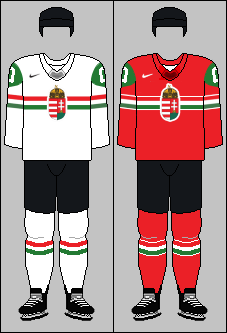

Ranking
- Current IIHF: 17 ▲2 (3 June 2026)
- Highest IIHF: 16 (2025)
- Lowest IIHF: 22 (2003–06)

First international
- Austria 6–0 Hungary (Vienna, Austria; 24 January 1927)

Biggest win
- Hungary 31–1 Belgium (Den Bosch, Netherlands; 4 March 1971)

Biggest defeat
- Soviet Union 19–1 Hungary (Innsbruck, Austria; 28 January 1964)

Olympics
- Appearances: 3 (first in 1928)

IIHF World Championships
- Appearances: 58 (first in 1930)
- Best result: 5th (1937)

International record (W–L–T)
- 416–498–62

The Hungarian men's national ice hockey team is the national ice hockey team of Hungary. They have participated in the IIHF European Championships, the IIHF World Hockey Championships and the Olympic Games since 1928. A consistent participant of the annual World Championship, Hungary has played at the Olympics three times, most recently in 1964. They are currently ranked 19th in the world by the IIHF.

The team is controlled by the Hungarian Ice Hockey Federation (Magyar Jégkorong Szövetség). No Hungarian-born players have ever played in North America's National Hockey League; however, three have been selected in the NHL entry draft: Tamás Gröschl by the Edmonton Oilers (1999), Levente Szuper by the Calgary Flames (2000), János Vas by the Dallas Stars (2002), and Domán Szongoth by the Buffalo Sabres(2026).

== History ==
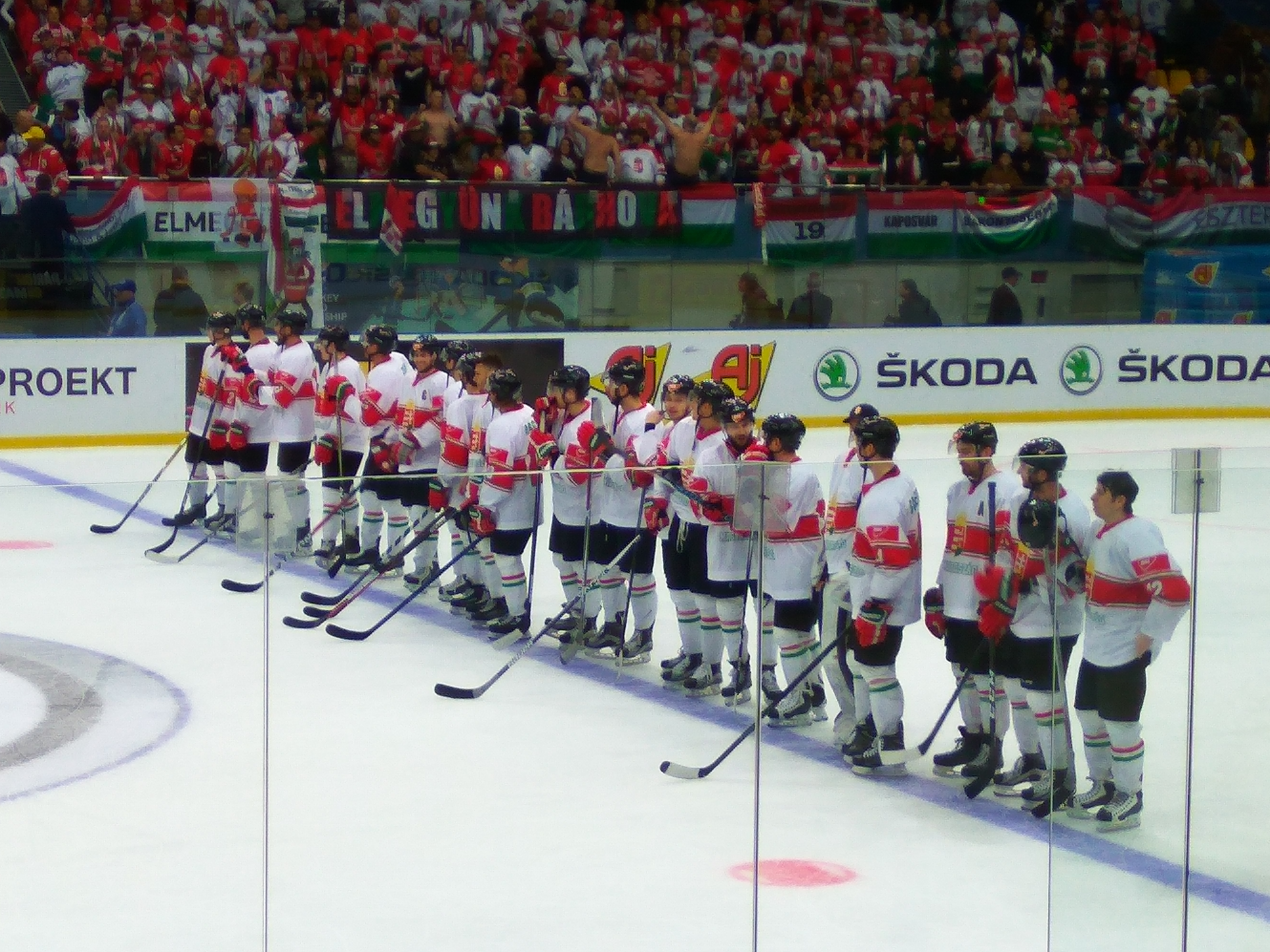
The Hungarian team during the 2017 World Championship Division IA tournament in Ukraine.

The Hungarian team won its group in the 2008 IIHF World Championship Division I, and therefore qualified to play in the Elite Division of the 2009 IIHF World Championship. This is the first time since 1939 that Hungary has qualified to play in the highest division of international hockey. The advance was, however, marred by the sudden death of team captain Gábor Ocskay, and the team was eventually relegated to Division I again.

In 2015, Hungary finished second in its group in the 2015 IIHF World Championship Division I, behind Kazakhstan to gain promotion to the 2016 IIHF World Championship.

On 4 May 2024, Hungary beat Slovenia 2–1 on the last match day of the 2024 IIHF World Championship Division I and qualify for the IIHF World Championship . Consequently, Hungary qualified for the 2025 IIHF World Championship, and after that for the 2026 IIHF World Championship.

== Tournament record ==
=== Olympic Games ===
Year	Finish	Rank
(Switzerland) 1928 St. Moritz	Preliminary round	11th place
(Nazi Germany) 1936 Garmisch-Partenkirchen	Second round	8th place
(Austria) 1964 Innsbruck	Consolation Round	16th place

=== World Championship ===
Year	Finish	Rank
(France) / (Austria) / (Germany) 1930 Chamonix/Vienna/Berlin	Quarterfinals	7th
(Poland) 1931 Krynica	Consolation round	7th
(Czechoslovakia) 1933 Prague	Seventh place game	7th
(Italy) 1934 Milan	Third round	6th
(Switzerland) 1935 Davos	Consolation Round	11th
(United Kingdom) 1937 London	Consolation Round	5th
(Czechoslovakia) 1938 Prague	Second Round	7th
(Switzerland) 1939 Zürich/Basel	Consolation Round	7th
(Czechoslovakia) 1959 Plzeň	2nd in the Group B	14th
(Sweden) 1963 Stockholm	2nd in the Group C	17th
(Austria) 1964 Innsbruck	8th in the Group B	16th
(Finland) 1965 Turku/Rauma/Pori	4th in the Group B	12th
(Socialist Federal Republic of Yugoslavia) 1966 Zagreb	7th in the Group B	15th
(Austria) 1967 Vienna	8th in the Group B, Relegation	16th
(Socialist Federal Republic of Yugoslavia) 1969 Skopje	3rd in the Group C	17th
(Romania) 1970 Galaţi	4th in the Group C	18th
1971 Netherlands	3rd in the Group C	19th
(Romania) 1972 Miercurea-Ciuc	5th in the Group C	18th
1973 Netherlands	3rd in the Group C	17th
(France) 1974 Grenoble/Gap/Lyon	4th in the Group C	18th
(Bulgaria) 1975 Sofia	4th in the Group C	18th
(Poland) 1976 Gdańsk	2nd in the Group C, Promoted	18th
(Japan) 1977 Tokyo	6th in the Group B	14th
(Socialist Federal Republic of Yugoslavia) 1978 Belgrade	6th in the Group B	13th
(Romania) 1979 Galați	9th in the Group B, Relegation	17th
(China) 1981 Beijing	3rd in the Group C	19th
(Spain) 1982 Jaca	5th in the Group C	21st
(Hungary) 1983 Budapest	2nd in the Group C, Promoted	18th
(Switzerland) 1985 Fribourg	8th in the Group B, Relegation	16th
(Spain) 1986 Puigcerda	6th in the Group C	22nd
(Denmark) 1987 Copenhagen/Herlev/Hørsholm	5th in the Group C	21st
(Australia) 1989 Sydney	4th in the Group C	20th
(Hungary) 1990 Budapest	7th in the Group C	23rd
(Denmark) 1991 Brøndby	6th in the Group C	22nd
(United Kingdom) 1992 Hull	4th in the Group C1	24th
(Slovenia) 1993 Ljubljana	4th in the Group C	24th
(Slovakia) 1994 Poprad/Spišská Nová Ves	6th in the Group C1	26th
(Bulgaria) 1995 Sofia	8th in the Group C1	26th
(Slovenia) 1996 Jesenice/Kranj	4th in the Group C	24th
(Estonia) 1997 Tallinn/Kohtla-Järve	6th in the Group C	26th
(Hungary) 1998 Budapest/Székesfehérvár/Dunaújváros	1st in the Group C, Promoted	25th
(Denmark) 1999 Odense/Rodovre	8th in the Group B, Relegation	24th
(China) 2000 Beijing	1st in the Group C, Promoted	25th
(France) 2001 Grenoble	4th in Division I, Group A	23rd
(Hungary) 2002 Székesfehérvár/Dunaújváros	2nd in Division I, Group B	20th
(Hungary) 2003 Budapest	3rd in Division I, Group A	21st
(Norway) 2004 Oslo	4th in Division I, Group A	24th
(Hungary) 2005 Debrecen	3rd in Division I, Group A	21st
(France) 2006 Amiens	4th in Division I, Group A	23rd
(Slovenia) 2007 Ljubljana	2nd in Division I, Group B	19th
(Japan) 2008 Sapporo	1st in Division I, Group B, Promoted	18th
(Switzerland) 2009 Bern/Kloten	Relegation round	16th
(Slovenia) 2010 Ljubljana	2nd in Division I, Group B	20th
(Hungary) 2011 Budapest	2nd in Division I, Group A	19th
(Slovenia) 2012 Ljubljana	3rd in Division I, Group A	19th
(Hungary) 2013 Budapest	3rd in Division I, Group A	19th
(South Korea) 2014 Goyang	5th in Division I, Group A	21st
(Poland) 2015 Kraków	2nd in Division I, Group A, Promoted	18th
(Russia) 2016 Moscow/Saint Petersburg	Preliminary round, Relegation	15th
(Ukraine) 2017 Kyiv	5th in Division I, Group A	21st
(Hungary) 2018 Budapest	4th in Division I, Group A	20th
(Kazakhstan) 2019 Nur-Sultan	5th in Division I, Group A	21st
(Slovenia) 2020 Ljubljana	Cancelled due to the coronavirus pandemic	–
(Slovenia) 2021 Ljubljana	Cancelled due to the coronavirus pandemic	–
(Slovenia) 2022 Ljubljana	2nd in Division I, Group A, Promoted	18th
(Finland) / (Latvia) 2023 Tampere/Riga	Preliminary round, Relegation	15th
(Italy) 2024 Bolzano	1st in Division I, Group A, Promoted	17th
(Sweden) / (Denmark) 2025 Stockholm/Herning	Preliminary round	14th
(Switzerland) 2026 Zurich/Fribourg	Preliminary round	14th
(Germany) 2027 Düsseldorf/Mannheim		

=== European Championship ===
Games	GP	W	T	L	GF	GA	Finish	Rank
1910–1926	did not participate.							
(Austria) 1927 Wien	5	0	0	5	5	1	Round-robin	6th
(Hungary) 1929 Budapest	4	0	1	3	2	7	Second round	6th
(Germany) 1932 Berlin	did not participate							

== Team ==
=== Current roster ===
Roster for the 2026 IIHF World Championship.

Head coach: Gergely Majoross

No.	Pos.	Name	Height	Weight	Birthdate	Team
1	G	Bence Bálizs	1.93 m (6 ft 4 in)	95 kg (209 lb)	30 May 1993 (age 33)	(Hungary) Ferencvárosi TC
2	D	Márkó Csollák	1.90 m (6 ft 3 in)	80 kg (180 lb)	22 August 2002 (age 24)	(Hungary) DVTK Jegesmedvék
5	F	Domán Szongoth	1.86 m (6 ft 1 in)	90 kg (200 lb)	8 June 2008 (age 18)	(Finland) KooKoo
11	F	Bence Horváth	1.82 m (6 ft 0 in)	85 kg (187 lb)	22 February 2004 (age 22)	(Finland) Mikkelin Jukurit
12	D	Bence Stipsicz	1.86 m (6 ft 1 in)	86 kg (190 lb)	3 February 1997 (age 29)	(Hungary) Fehérvár AV19
13	F	Krisztián Nagy	1.80 m (5 ft 11 in)	87 kg (192 lb)	28 July 1994 (age 32)	(Hungary) Ferencvárosi TC
16	F	János Hári	1.75 m (5 ft 9 in)	77 kg (170 lb)	3 May 1992 (age 34)	(Hungary) Fehérvár AV19
17	D	Roland Kiss	1.83 m (6 ft 0 in)	81 kg (179 lb)	17 April 1999 (age 27)	(Hungary) Fehérvár AV19
20	F	István Sofron – A	1.89 m (6 ft 2 in)	91 kg (201 lb)	24 February 1988 (age 38)	(Hungary) Ferencvárosi TC
21	F	Kristóf Papp	1.79 m (5 ft 10 in)	80 kg (180 lb)	27 January 2001 (age 25)	(United States) Norfolk Admirals
22	F	Vilmos Galló	1.82 m (6 ft 0 in)	86 kg (190 lb)	31 July 1996 (age 30)	(Finland) KooKoo
23	D	Zétény Hadobás	1.87 m (6 ft 2 in)	85 kg (187 lb)	2 March 2003 (age 23)	(Hungary) Ferencvárosi TC
25	D	Gabor Tornyai	1.86 m (6 ft 1 in)	96 kg (212 lb)	6 October 1998 (age 28)	(Hungary) Újpesti TE
28	F	István Bartalis	1.86 m (6 ft 1 in)	88 kg (194 lb)	7 September 1990 (age 36)	(Hungary) Fehérvár AV19
30	G	Ádám Vay	1.96 m (6 ft 5 in)	103 kg (227 lb)	22 March 1994 (age 32)	(Czech Republic) Piráti Chomutov
33	D	Milán Horváth	1.86 m (6 ft 1 in)	93 kg (205 lb)	2 February 2001 (age 25)	(Hungary) Ferencvárosi TC
34	F	István Terbócs – A	1.83 m (6 ft 0 in)	92 kg (203 lb)	28 June 1996 (age 30)	(Hungary) Fehérvár AV19
36	F	Csanád Erdély – C	1.88 m (6 ft 2 in)	86 kg (190 lb)	5 April 1996 (age 30)	(Hungary) Fehérvár AV19
42	F	Márton Nemes	1.86 m (6 ft 1 in)	83 kg (183 lb)	23 October 2005 (age 21)	(United States) Bentley Falcons
45	F	Csanád Ravasz	1.85 m (6 ft 1 in)	80 kg (180 lb)	5 March 2005 (age 21)	(Romania) Gyergyói HK
55	D	Tamás Ortenszky	1.87 m (6 ft 2 in)	91 kg (201 lb)	5 January 2002 (age 24)	(Switzerland) EHC Winterthur
61	F	Péter Vincze	1.80 m (5 ft 11 in)	85 kg (187 lb)	16 February 1995 (age 31)	(Romania) Gyergyói HK
70	D	Zsombor Garát	1.85 m (6 ft 1 in)	90 kg (200 lb)	27 July 1997 (age 29)	(England) Nottingham Panthers
76	G	Levente Hegedüs	1.88 m (6 ft 2 in)	80 kg (180 lb)	19 February 2004 (age 22)	(Hungary) Fehérvár Hockey Academy 19
86	F	Balázs Sebők	1.85 m (6 ft 1 in)	90 kg (200 lb)	14 December 1994 (age 31)	(Finland) HC Ässät Pori
88	F	Tamás Sárpátki	1.92 m (6 ft 4 in)	81 kg (179 lb)	28 December 1994 (age 31)	(Romania) Gyergyói HK

=== Former players ===
- János Ancsin
- Béla Háray
- István Hircsák
- László Jakabházy
- Zoltán Jeney
- Balázs Kangyal
- Csaba Kovács, Sr.
- Péter Kovalcsik
- György Margó
- András Mészöly
- Sándor Miklós
- Gábor Ocskay, Jr.
- Gábor Ocskay, Sr.
- Krisztián Palkovics
- Antal Palla
- György Pásztor
- György Raffa
- Levente Szuper
- Viktor Zsitva

==== NHL Drafts ====
Players from Hungary to be drafted in the NHL

Year	Name	Overall	Team
1993	Frank Banham^{1}	147th	Washington Capitals
1999	Tamás Gröschl	256th	Edmonton Oilers
2000	Levente Szuper	116th	Calgary Flames
2002	János Vas	32nd	Dallas Stars
2004	Andrew Sarauer^{2}	125th	Vancouver Canucks
2026	Domán Szongoth	156th	Buffalo Sabres

Notes

1. Banham was drafted as a Canadian. In 2015, he acquired Hungarian citizenship.
2. Sarauer was drafted as a Canadian. In 2015, he acquired Hungarian citizenship.

== All-time record ==
Updated as of 8 November 2025. Teams listed in italics are defunct.

Opponent	Played	Won	Drawn	Lost	GF	GA	GD
Australia	5	4	0	1	39	18	+21
Austria	57	15	2	40	141	215	–74
Belarus	15	1	1	13	27	75	–48
Belgium	17	13	1	3	162	41	+121
Bulgaria	47	36	1	10	253	147	+106
Canada	15	0	3	12	12	84	–72
China	19	10	3	6	85	55	+30
Croatia	24	23	1	0	178	30	+148
Czech Republic	1	0	0	1	1	6	–5
Czechoslovakia	5	0	1	4	1	13	–12
Denmark	67	34	4	29	286	228	+58
East Germany	11	0	0	11	23	107	–84
Estonia	8	4	2	2	37	28	+9
Finland	5	1	0	4	6	25	–19
France	53	27	4	22	222	207	+15
Germany	23	1	4	18	33	78	–45
Great Britain	34	18	1	15	113	96	+17
Israel	1	1	0	0	8	0	+8
Italy	51	21	6	24	150	172	–22
Japan	35	18	0	17	101	112	–12
Kazakhstan	15	2	0	13	25	70	–45
Latvia	6	1	1	4	12	31	–19
Lithuania	16	15	0	1	97	25	+72
Netherlands	32	18	3	11	170	106	+64
North Korea	12	7	0	5	71	38	+33
Norway	31	12	3	16	83	110	–37
Poland	69	26	6	37	151	214	–63
Protectorate of Bohemia and Moravia	3	0	1	2	2	9	−7
Romania	69	24	5	40	240	292	–52
Russia	1	0	0	1	1	5	−4
Serbia	1	1	0	0	9	1	+8
Serbia and Montenegro	2	2	0	0	22	1	+21
Slovakia	9	2	0	7	22	57	–35
Slovenia	44	10	2	32	96	162	–66
South Africa	4	4	0	0	57	7	+50
South Korea	22	16	1	5	128	59	+69
Soviet Union	1	0	0	1	1	19	–18
Spain	9	9	0	0	82	22	+60
Sweden	8	1	0	7	7	30	−23
Switzerland	25	3	1	21	49	137	–88
Ukraine	31	12	0	19	67	109	–42
United States	4	0	0	4	2	21	–19
Yugoslavia	52	24	6	22	181	173	+8
Total	957	415	63	479	3 441	3 427	+14
