= TKS Toruń =

Polish multisport club

- Full name: Toruński Klub Sportowy
- Founded: 10 August 1922
- Dissolved: 1931 (1938)
Home colours	Away colours

Toruński KS is a defunct Polish multisport club from Toruń, which in the late 1920s played in the Polish Football League for two years (1927, 1928).

== History ==
The club was founded on 10 August 1922 and expanded rapidly, although it was based on football, new sections were quickly set up. The club quickly became one of the largest clubs in Polish Pomerania, and the culmination of its strength was the invitation in 1927 of TKS' players to the newly created central Polish Football League.

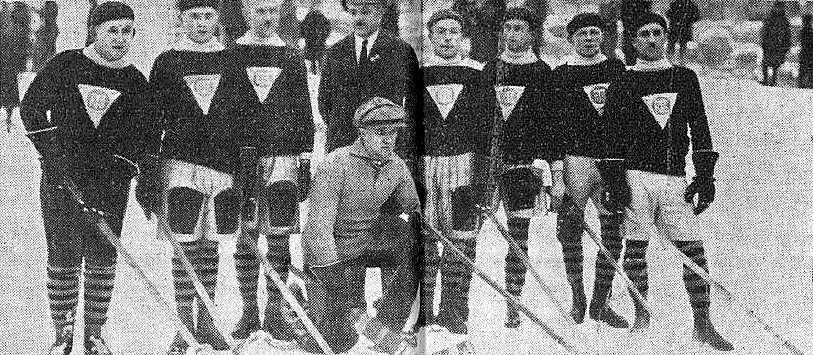
TKS ice hockey team in 1928

In that league the team played two incomplete seasons. The first one ended at 10th place (out of 14 teams; the las one was relegated), but the 1928 year was the culmination of the club's serious troubles: troubled by financial problems and injuries of players, he fought for maintenance. However, when the PZPN Discipline Department admitted few wo against TKS, and ignored the beating of Toruń players at the Warta stadium in Poznań, the club decided to withdraw from the league after 19th match day (out of 28 planned). They tried to return to the league for the next two years, but the lost eliminations in 1930, combined with increasing financial difficulties caused the club to collapse. The players' results, which did not meet the ambitions of the management, led to an internal split in the club, which resulted in the liquidation of almost all sections, of which several were rescued by transferring them to other clubs.

A new club TKS 29 Toruń was created, which focused only on football. In "old" TKS only the hockey section remained, but for her the 1930/31 season was the last too. In December 1931 hockey players decided to liquidate the club. The new club TKS 29 lasts till 1938, when was absorbed by another club - Pomorzanin Toruń.

Toruński KS is infamous for its record defeat - highest defeat in Polish league history: on 11 September 1927, playing with only 10 players, of which 4 were juniors, it was routed 0–15 by Wisła Kraków.
