= 1927 Ice Hockey European Championship =

1927 edition of the Ice Hockey European Championship

The 1927 Ice Hockey European Championship was the 12th edition of the ice hockey tournament for European countries associated to the International Ice Hockey Federation.

The tournament was played between January 24, and January 29, 1927, in Vienna, Austria, and it was won by Austria.

== Results ==
January 24

Team #1	Score	Team #2
Austria	6:0	Hungary
Germany	2:1	Czechoslovakia

January 25

Team #1	Score	Team #2
Germany	2:1	Poland
Belgium	2:0	Czechoslovakia

January 26

Team #1	Score	Team #2
Belgium	6:0	Hungary
Austria	3:1	Poland

January 27

Team #1	Score	Team #2
Germany	5:0	Hungary
Czechoslovakia	1:1	Poland
Austria	1:0	Belgium

January 28

Team #1	Score	Team #2
Czechoslovakia	5:0	Hungary
Belgium	2:2	Poland
Austria	2:1	Germany

January 29

Team #1	Score	Team #2
Belgium	3:0	Germany
Poland	6:1	Hungary
Austria	1:0	Czechoslovakia

=== Final standings ===
	GP	W	T	L	GF	GA	DIF	Pts
Austria	5	5	0	0	13	2	+11	10
Belgium	5	3	1	1	13	3	+10	7
Germany	5	3	0	2	10	7	+3	6
Poland	5	1	2	2	11	9	+2	4
Czechoslovakia	5	1	1	3	7	6	+1	3
Hungary	5	0	0	5	1	28	-27	0

=== Top Goalscorer ===
Wilhelm Kreitz (Belgium), 7 goals

European Championship 1927 winner

Austria
First title
