= AZS Warsaw =

Academic Sports Association Warsaw (Polish: Akademicki Związek Sportowy Warszawa) was a former multi-section University sports club based in Warsaw, Poland. The club was dissolved into University clubs within Universities in Warsaw that were re-established when the club was dissolved, including AZS Politechnika Warsaw, and AZS Uniwersytet Warszawski.

== History ==
Warsaw was the second academic centre after Kraków, in which the local sports academy was established. The club was founded on 19 December 1919, after a series of founding meetings that began in the autumn of 1919.

The Temporary Organising Committee of AZS Warsaw was established as early as 1915, but the commanders of the German Empire, which entered Warsaw in 1915, did not consent to the functioning of a large student organisation which, apart from sports, was also independent in nature. Due to the prohibition, separate sports associations were established between the years 1916-1917, at each of the Universities. These associations took different names:

- Sports Association of University of Technology Students (Polish: Związek Sportowy Słuchaczów Politechniki) at the Warsaw University of Technology
- University Sports Association (Polish: Uniwersytecki Związek Sportowy) at the University of Warsaw
- A sports club at the SGH Warsaw School of Economics
- A sports club at the Warsaw University of Life Sciences

After the withdrawal of German troops from Warsaw, and Poland regaining independence in 1918, it was decided to merge all four clubs into one, representing University sports within the capital. This was done in the vice-rector's building of the University of Warsaw in the autumn of 1919.

== Sections ==
=== Athletics ===
There was an athletics department.

During World War II, three athletes of AZS Warsaw, Stanisław Fiedorowicz, Jerzy Koźlicki and Julian Gruner, were among Poles murdered by the Russians in the large Katyn massacre in April–May 1940. Olympic athletes Stanisław Sośnicki and Wojciech Trojanowski were prisoners of the German prisoner-of-war camp Oflag II-C.

=== Boxing ===
==== History ====
The ancestor of the boxing section was the Academic Boxing Association, which was established before 1924. It became a section of AZS Warsaw before 1930.

The section was not very successful in Poland.

=== Gymnastics ===
Andrzej Konopka, Wiesława Noskiewicz, and Łukasz Uhma represented the club at various Summer Olympic Games.

=== Ice Hockey ===
==== History ====
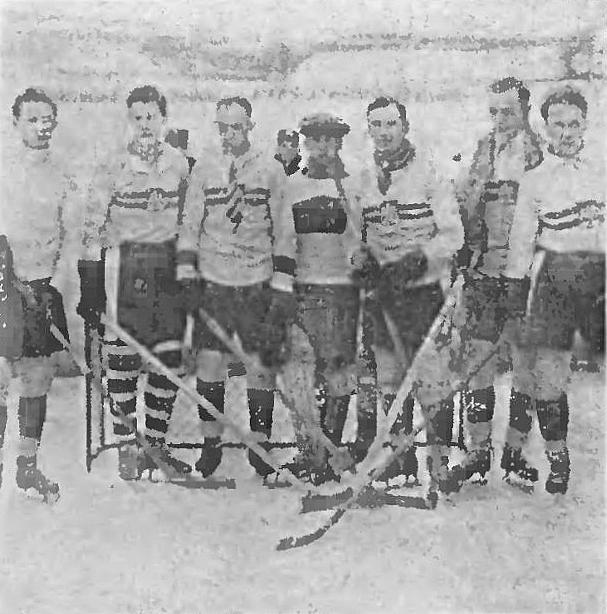
AZS Warsaw ice hockey team, which won the 1929 Polish Championship

This section was established in 1922. it was one of the first hockey teams in Poland, next to Polonia Warsaw. Initially, training sessions took place at the ice rink in Łazienki Park, then at Karowa Street and finally at Dynasy, where hockey players stayed for many years.

The section was one of the best hockey teams of the 1920s and 1930s. In 1927, the team became the first Polish champions in history. The team defended their title in the next four editions of the championships, until 1931. In 1927, the team was recognised as the fifth best hockey team in Europe.

In 1924, AZS Warsaw, together with Polonia Warsaw, the Warsaw Skating Society, and KS Warszawianka, founded the Polish Ice Hockey Federation.

AZS Warsaw players became the core of Polish representation in ice hockey for many years. In 1926, AZS Warsaw hockey players, as the Polish national team, went to the European Ice Hockey Championships in Davos, where they lost 1:2 to France and Austria. In the squad for the European Championships in Vienna in 1927, the formation was once again primarily players from the Warsaw club. The Poles took fourth place in the tournament. AZS Warsaw won the academic world championships in 1928.

AZS Warsaw was an important hockey team until the outbreak of World War II, although other teams began to dominate the league after 1931.

During the war, two players, Edmund Czaplicki and Aleksander Kowalski, were among Poles murdered by the Russians in the large Katyn massacre in April–May 1940. Pre-war player Tadeusz Adamowski was a prisoner of the German prisoner-of-war camp Oflag II-C.

This section was re-activated after the end of the war, but was not able to return to its pre-war successes. This was largely due to the presence of Legia Warsaw, which had gathered old representatives around them, and used the fact that it was a military club to attract talented younger players. The section ceased to exist shortly after 1957.

Famous players included Olympic athletes Tadeusz Adamowski and Aleksander Kowalski.
