= List of athletes with the most appearances at Olympic Games =

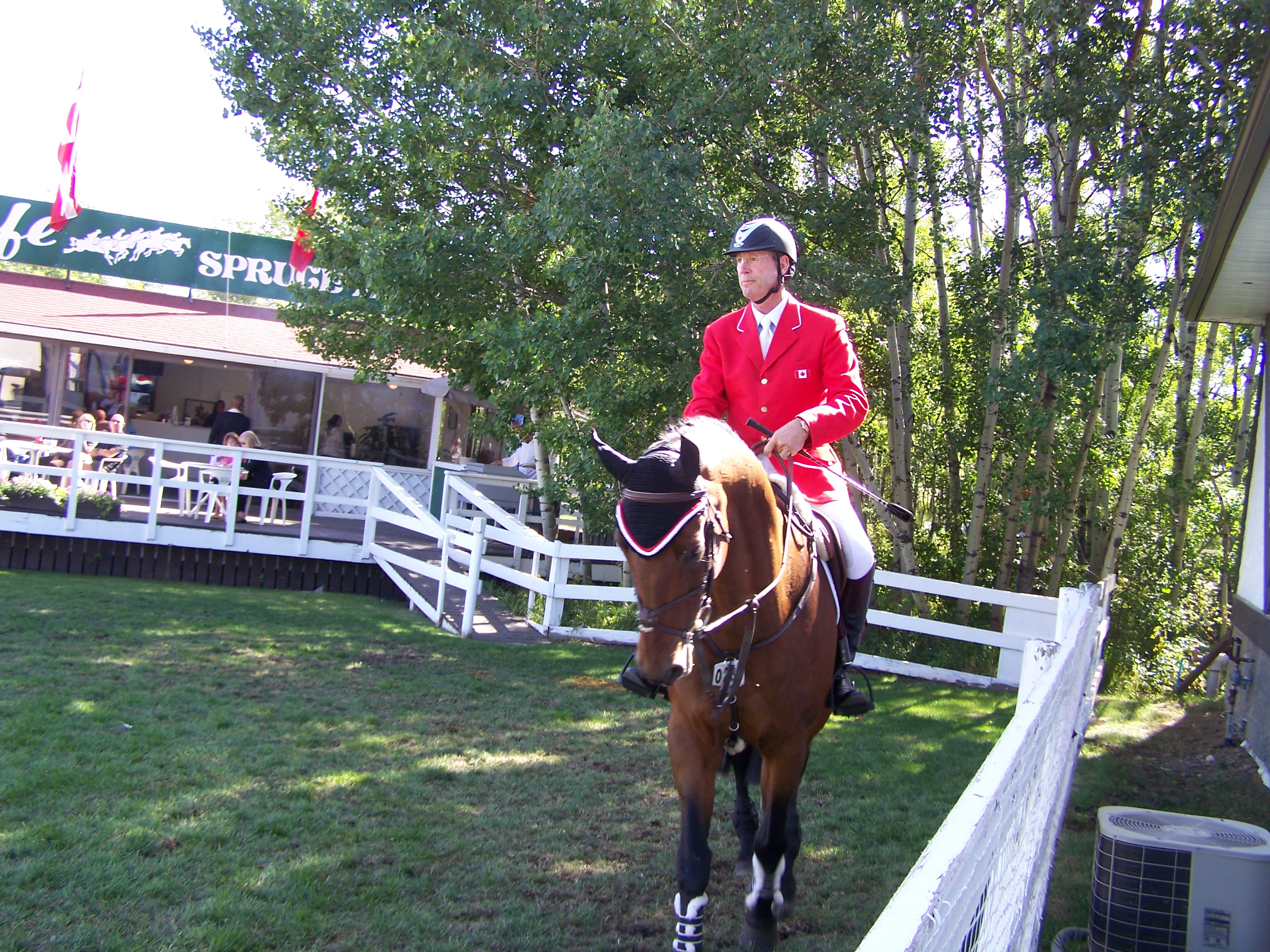
Canadian Ian Millar in a 2007 picture. At London 2012 he participated in a record 10th Olympics

Only a small fraction of the world's population ever competes at the Olympic Games; an even smaller fraction competes in multiple Games. 1012 athletes (687 men and 325 women) have participated in at least five Olympics from Athens 1896 to Milano Cortina 2026, but excluding the 1906 Intercalated Games. 239 of these have gone on to make at least a sixth Olympic appearance.

== Multiple appearances ==
Several athletes would have made more appearances at the Olympics if not for reasons out of their control, such as World War I and World War II (no Olympics were held in 1916, 1940 or 1944), politically motivated boycotts, financial difficulties, or ill-timed injuries.

Canadian equestrian athlete Ian Millar and Georgian sports shooter Nino Salukvadze (representing Soviet Union in 1988 and Unified Team in 1992) have competed at ten Olympic games. Austrian sailor Hubert Raudaschl and Latvian shooter Afanasijs Kuzmins (representing Soviet Union until 1988) have each made nine Olympic appearances.

Half of all six-time Olympians belong to the shooting, equestrian, sailing and table tennis disciplines, which are known for allowing athletes more longevity at the elite level. Athletics and cross-country skiing also provide a large number of athletes who have competed at five Olympics.

Number of athletes who have appeared at multiple Olympics from 1896 to 2026 inclusive
	Exact number of Olympic appearances						Minimum number of Olympic appearances					
	5	6	7	8	9	10	5	6	7	8	9	10
Men	523	121	29	11	2	1	687	164	43	14	3	1
Women	250	50	19	5	0	1	325	75	25	6	1	1
Total	773	171	48	16	2	2	1012	239	68	20	4	2
This table shows the number of athletes who have appeared at exactly (or at least) n Olympic Games between 1896 and 2026, as n varies from 5 to 10. For example, 29 men have appeared at exactly seven Olympics while 43 men have appeared in at least seven Olympics. Appearances at the 1906 Intercalated Games are not included. Winter and Summer Olympics are counted as 'different' Olympics even if they occurred in the same year. While these numbers are believed to be correct, it is possible that one or two athletes have been missed, particularly with five-time Olympians.

Approximately a quarter of long-competing athletes are female. Italian canoeist Josefa Idem became the first woman to take part in eight Olympics, eventually reaching the final of the K1-500m event at the age of 48. Before her, the closest a female athlete had come to competing at eight Olympics was 0.028 seconds, which was the time by which Jamaican-Slovenian sprinter Merlene Ottey had failed to meet the qualification time required for appearance at the 2008 Summer Olympics, at age 48. At the 2024 Summer Olympics, Georgian sports shooter Nino Salukvadze competed in her 10th consecutive Olympic Games at age 55, becoming the first female athlete in history to do so.

Four six-time Olympians here have participated in Olympic Games over a period of 40 years: Bahamian sailor Durward Knowles (8 Olympics), Danish sailor Paul Elvstrøm (8), Danish fencer Ivan Osiier (7), and Norwegian sailor Magnus Konow (6). Note should also be made of Japanese equestrian Hiroshi Hoketsu, whose first and third Olympic appearances in 1964 and 2012 were 48 years apart. Uzbek gymnast Oksana Chusovitina has competed at every Olympics from 1992 to 2020. She continues to compete at the elite level in her late 40s in a sport where few competitors continue past their mid-20s or compete at two or three Olympics.

Two five-time Olympians competed under four different flags at the Olympics, one of whom never actually changed nationality. Both shooter Jasna Šekarić (7 Olympics) and table tennis player Ilija Lupulesku (5) competed for Yugoslavia at the 1988 Olympics. In 1992, since Yugoslavia was under UN sanctions, they (and fifty other Serbians, Montenegrins and Macedonians) competed as Independent Olympic Participants before competing at the next Olympics under the flag of Serbia and Montenegro. Lupulesku became an American citizen and competed for the USA in 2004, while Šekarić finally competed for Serbia in 2008.

30 five-time Olympians have won at least eight medals: American swimmer Michael Phelps (28), Norwegian cross-country skier Marit Bjørgen (15), Norwegian biathlete Ole Einar Bjørndalen (14), Italian short track speed skater Arianna Fontana (14), German equestrian Isabell Werth (14), Italian fencer Edoardo Mangiarotti (13), Dutch speed skater Ireen Wüst (13), German kayaker Birgit Fischer (12), American swimmer Dara Torres (12), American track and field athlete Allyson Felix (11), Hungarian fencer Aladár Gerevich (10), Italian cross-country skier Stefania Belmondo (10), Russian cross-country skier Raisa Smetanina (10), Finnish gymnast Heikki Savolainen (9), Jamaican-Slovenian sprinter Merlene Ottey (9), German speed skater Claudia Pechstein (9), Italian fencer Valentina Vezzali (9), Dutch equestrian Anky van Grunsven (9), German biathlete Uschi Disl (9), Dutch speed skater Sven Kramer (9), Romanian rower Elisabeta Oleniuc (8), German equestrian Reiner Klimke (8), Italian fencer Giovanna Trillini (8), French fencer Philippe Cattiau (8), Jamaican track and field athlete Veronica Campbell-Brown (8), Jamaican track and field athlete Shelly-Ann Fraser-Pryce (8), Russian diver Dmitri Sautin (8), Norwegian alpine skier Kjetil André Aamodt (8), German biathlete Ricco Groß (8) and british cyclist Bradley Wiggins (8).

59 athletes who have competed in at least five Olympics participated in two sports: 24 of them competing at both the Winter and Summer Olympics, 21 competing at the Summer Olympics and 14 competing at the Winter Olympics. The most common cross-over sports are athletics/bobsleigh (8 competitors) and cycling/speed skating (3 competitors).

Finnish cross-country skiers Harri Kirvesniemi and Marja-Liisa Kirvesniemi-Hämäläinen competed at six Olympics, the most for a married couple. Married couples among five-time Olympians include biathletes Ole Einar Bjørndalen (Norway) and Nathalie Santer-Bjørndalen (Italy/Belgium), Lithuanian pairs figure skaters Margarita Drobiazko and Povilas Vanagas, lugers Susi Erdmann (Germany) and Gerhard Plankensteiner (Italy).

Familial relationships among five-time Olympians include Belgian shooters François Lafortune Sr and Jr (father-son; with their brothers/uncles, they have seventeen Olympic appearances between them), Italian equestrians Piero and Raimondo d'Inzeo (brothers), British canoeists Andrew and Stephen Train (brothers), Greek shooters Alexandros and Ioannis Theofilakis (brothers), Italian cross-country skiers Sabina Valbusa-Fulvio Valbusa and Manuela Di Centa-Giorgio Di Centa (sister-brother), Brazilian equestrians Nelson and Rodrigo Pessoa (father-son), Austrian lugers Markus and Tobias Schiegl (cousins), Latvian skeleton racers Martins Dukurs and Tomass Dukurs (brothers). A more tenuous relationship is that of Argentine sailors Jorge Salas Chávez and Roberto Sieburger; Chávez's cousin Jorge del Río Salas (4 Olympics) married Sieburger's cousin Marylin Sieburger. (The extended Sieburger-Salas clan includes seven Argentinian sailors with twenty Olympic appearances.)

== List of athletes with at least six Olympic appearances ==
So far, there have been 239 athletes who have appeared at Olympic Games at least six times. 70 of them have never won an Olympic medal. Athletes in bold are believed to be still active, i.e., have yet to announce their retirement. Female athletes are displayed with a pink background. Sorting is by number of appearances, Games of last appearance, date of birth.

App.	Athlete	Representing	Birth/Death	Games	Period (age of first/last)	Sport	Gold medal	Silver medal	Bronze medal	Tot.
10	Ian Millar	Canada	1947	1972–1976, 1984–2012	40 years (25/65)	Equestrian	0	1	0	1
10	**Nino Salukvadze**	Soviet Union (1), Unified Team (1) and Georgia (8)	1969	1988–2024	36 years (19/55)	Shooting	1	1	1	3
9	Hubert Raudaschl	Austria	1942–2025	1964–1996	32 years (22/54)	Sailing	0	2	0	2
9	Afanasijs Kuzmins	Soviet Union (3) and Latvia (6)	1947	1976–1980, 1988–2012	36 years (29/65)	Shooting	1	1	0	2
8	Piero d'Inzeo	Italy	1923–2014	1948–1976	28 years (25/53)	Equestrian	0	2	4	6
8	Raimondo d'Inzeo	Italy	1925–2013	1948–1976	28 years (23/51)	Equestrian	1	2	3	6
8	Durward Knowles	Great Britain (1) and ///Bahamas (7)	1917–2018	1948–1972, 1988	40 years (31/71)	Sailing	1	0	1	2
8	Paul Elvstrøm	Denmark	1928–2016	1948–1960, 1968–1972, 1984–1988	40 years (20/60)	Sailing	4	0	0	4
8	Rajmond Debevec	Yugoslavia (2) and Slovenia (6)	1963	1984–2012	28 years (21/49)	Shooting	1	0	2	3
8	Josefa Idem Guerrini	West Germany (2) and Italy (6)	1964	1984–2012	28 years (20/48)	Canoeing	1	2	2	5
8	**Lesley Thompson**	Canada	1959	1984–2000, 2008–2016	32 years (24/56)	Rowing	1	3	1	5
8	**Francisco Boza**	Peru	1964	1980–2004, 2016	36 years (15/51)	Shooting	0	1	0	1
8	**Noriaki Kasai**	/Japan	1972	1992–2018	26 years (19/45)	Ski jumping	0	2	1	3
8	**Andrew Hoy**	Australia	1959	1984–2004, 2012, 2020	37 years (25/62)	Equestrian	3	2	1	6
8	Jesús Ángel García Bragado	Spain	1969	1992–2020	29 years (22/51)	Athletics	0	0	0	0
8	**Oksana Chusovitina**	Unified Team (1), Uzbekistan (5) and Germany (2)	1975	1992–2020	29 years (17/46)	Gymnastics	1	1	0	2
8	**Claudia Pechstein**	Germany	1972	1992–2006, 2014–2022	30 years (19/49)	Speed skating	5	2	2	9
8	**Jaqueline Mourão**	Brazil	1975	2004–2008, 2020 (S) + 2006–2022 (W)	18 years (28/46)	Biathlon (1), cross-country skiing (5) and cycling mountain bike (3)	0	0	0	0
8	**Giovanni Pellielo**	Italy	1972	1992–2016, 2024	32 years (22/54)	Shooting	0	3	1	4
8	**Rodrigo Pessoa**	Brazil	1972	1992–2012, 2020–2024	32 years (19/52)	Equestrian	1	0	2	3
7	Ivan Osiier	Denmark	1888–1965	1908–1912, 1920–1932, 1948	40 years (20/60)	Fencing	0	1	0	1
7	François Lafortune, Jr	Belgium	1932–2020	1952–1976	24 years (20/44)	Shooting	0	0	0	0
7	Kerstin Palm	Sweden	1946	1964–1988	24 years (18/42)	Fencing	0	0	0	0
7	John Michael Plumb	United States	1940	1964–1976, 1984–1992	28 years (24/52)	Equestrian	2	4	0	6
7	Ragnar Skanåker	Sweden	1934	1972–1996	24 years (38/62)	Shooting	1	2	1	4
7	Seiko Hashimoto	/Japan	1964	1984–1994 (W) + 1988–1996 (S)	12 years (20/32)	Speed skating (4) and track cycling (3)	0	0	1	1
7	Merlene Ottey	Jamaica (6) and Slovenia (1)	1960	1980–2004	24 years (20/44)	Athletics	0	3	6	9
7	Jeannie Longo	France	1958	1984–2008	24 years (26/50)	Road cycling (7) and track cycling (1)	1	2	1	4
7	**Jos Lansink**	Netherlands (4) and Belgium (3)	1961	1988–2012	24 years (27/51)	Equestrian	1	0	0	1
7	Ralf Schumann	East Germany (1) and Germany (6)	1962	1988–2012	24 years (26/50)	Shooting	3	2	0	5
7	**Jasna Šekarić**	Yugoslavia (1), Independent Olympic Participants (1), Serbia and Montenegro (3) and Serbia (2)	1965	1988–2012	24 years (22/46)	Shooting	1	3	1	5
7	Jörgen Persson	Sweden	1966	1988–2012	24 years (22/46)	Table tennis	0	0	0	0
7	Anky van Grunsven	Netherlands	1968	1988–2012	24 years (20/44)	Equestrian	3	5	1	9
7	Zoran Primorac	Yugoslavia (1) and Croatia (6)	1969	1988–2012	24 years (19/43)	Table tennis	0	1	0	1
7	Jean-Michel Saive	Belgium	1969	1988–2012	24 years (18/42)	Table tennis	0	0	0	0
7	Albert Demchenko	Unified Team (1) and Russia (6)	1971	1992–2014	22 years (19/41)	Luge	0	3	0	3
7	**Mark Todd**	New Zealand	1956	1984–1992, 2000, 2008–2016	32 years (28/60)	Equestrian	2	1	3	6
7	Nick Skelton	United Kingdom	1957	1988–1996, 2004–2016	28 years (30/58)	Equestrian	2	0	0	2
7	**Ludger Beerbaum**	West Germany (1) and Germany (6)	1963	1988–2008, 2016	28 years (25/52)	Equestrian	4	0	1	5
7	**Tinne Vilhelmson-Silfvén**	Sweden	1967	1992–2016	24 years (25/49)	Equestrian	0	0	0	0
7	**João Rodrigues**	Portugal	1971	1992–2016	24 years (20/44)	Sailing	0	0	0	0
7	**Ekaterina Karsten**	Unified Team (1) and /Belarus (6)	1972	1992–2016	24 years (20/44)	Rowing	2	1	2	5
7	Leander Paes	India	1973	1992–2016	24 years (19/43)	Tennis	0	0	1	1
7	Segun Toriola	Nigeria	1974	1992–2016	24 years (17/41)	Table tennis	0	0	0	0
7	**Sergei Dolidovich**	//Belarus	1973	1994–2018	24 years (20/44)	Cross-country skiing	0	0	0	0
7	Janne Ahonen	Finland	1977	1994–2018	24 years (16/40)	Ski jumping	0	2	0	2
7	Santiago Lange	Argentina	1961	1988, 1996–2008, 2016–2020	33 years (27/59)	Sailing	1	0	2	3
7	**Abdullah Al-Rashidi**	Kuwait (6) and Independent Olympic Participants (1)	1963	1996–2020	25 years (33/58)	Shooting	0	0	2	2
7	**Phillip Dutton**	Australia (3) and United States (4)	1963	1996–2020	25 years (32/57)	Equestrian	2	0	1	3
7	Mariya Grozdeva	Bulgaria	1972	1992–2012, 2020	29 years (20/49)	Shooting	2	0	3	5
7	**Isabell Werth**	Germany	1969	1992–2000, 2008, 2016–2024	32 years (23/55)	Equestrian	8	6	0	14
7	**Carl Hester**	United Kingdom	1967	1992, 2000–2004, 2012–2024	32 years (25/57)	Equestrian	1	1	2	4
7	Robert Scheidt	Brazil	1973	1996–2020	25 years (23/48)	Sailing	2	2	1	5
7	**Olufunke Oshonaike**	Nigeria	1975	1996–2020	25 years (21/46)	Table tennis	0	0	0	0
7	**Aida Mohamed**	Hungary	1976	1996–2020	25 years (20/45)	Fencing	0	0	0	0
7	Olaf Tufte	Norway	1976	1996–2020	25 years (20/45)	Rowing	2	1	1	4
7	Formiga	Brazil	1978	1996–2020	25 years (18/43)	Football	0	2	0	2
7	**Otryadyn Gündegmaa**	Mongolia	1978	1996–2020	25 years (18/43)	Shooting	0	1	0	1
7	**Taizo Sugitani**	/Japan	1976	1996–2016, 2024	28 years (20/48)	Equestrian	0	0	0	0
7	**Karin Donckers**	Belgium	1971	1992, 2000–2016, 2024	32 years (21/53)	Equestrian	0	0	0	0
7	**Simon Ammann**	Switzerland	1981	1998–2022	24 years (16/40)	Ski jumping	4	0	0	4
7	Timo Boll	Germany	1981	2000–2024	24 years (19/43)	Table tennis	0	2	2	4
7	**Teresa Portela**	Spain	1982	2000–2024	24 years (18/42)	Canoeing	0	1	0	1
7	**Mélina Robert-Michon**	France	1979	2000–2024	24 years (21/45)	Athletics	0	1	0	1
7	**Leuris Pupo**	Cuba	1977	2000–2024	24 years (23/47)	Shooting	1	1	0	2
7	**Sarah Schleper**	United States (4) and Mexico (3)	1979	1998–2010, 2018–2026	28 years (19/47)	Alpine skiing	0	0	0	0
7	**Tomoka Takeuchi**	Japan	1983	2002–2026	24 years (19/43)	Snowboarding	0	1	0	1
7	**Roland Fischnaller**	Italy	1980	2002–2026	24 years (21/45)	Snowboarding	0	0	0	0
6	Edgar Seligman	United Kingdom	1867–1958	1908–1912, 1920–1932	20 years (23/43)	Art competitions (2) and fencing (4)	0	2	0	2
6	Magnus Konow	Norway	1887–1972	1908–1912, 1920, 1928, 1936–1948	40 years (21/61)	Sailing	2	1	0	3
6	Norman Armitage	/United States	1907–1972	1928–1956	28 years (21/49)	Fencing	0	0	1	1
6	Aladár Gerevich	Kingdom of Hungary (2), Hungarian Republic (1) and Hungarian People's Republic (3)	1910–1991	1932–1960	28 years (22/50)	Fencing	7	1	2	10
6	Janice York Romary	//United States	1927–2007	1948–1968	20 years (19/39)	Fencing	0	0	0	0
6	Lia Manoliu	Socialist Republic of Romania	1932–1998	1952–1972	20 years (20/40)	Athletics	1	0	2	3
6	Jerzy Pawłowski	Poland	1932–2005	1952–1972	20 years (20/40)	Fencing	1	3	1	5
6	Hans Günter Winkler	United Team of Germany (3) and West Germany (3)	1926–2018	1956–1976	20 years (20/40)	Equestrian	5	1	1	7
6	William McMillan	/United States	1929–2000	1952, 1960–1976	20 years (27/47)	Shooting	1	0	0	1
6	Adam Smelczyński	Poland	1930–2021	1956–1976	20 years (26/45)	Shooting	0	1	0	1
6	Bill Hoskyns	Great Britain	1931–2013	1956–1976	20 years (25/45)	Fencing	0	2	0	2
6	Frank Chapot	United States	1932–2016	1956–1976	20 years (24/44)	Equestrian	0	2	0	2
6	Carl-Erik Eriksson	Sweden	1930–2023	1964–1984	20 years (34/54)	Bobsleigh	0	0	0	0
6	Jim Elder	/Canada	1934	1956–1960, 1968–1976, 1984	28 years (22/50)	Equestrian	1	0	1	2
6	Hans Fogh	Denmark (4) and Canada (2)	1938–2014	1960–1976, 1984	24 years (22/46)	Sailing	0	1	1	2
6	Reiner Klimke	United Team of Germany (2) and West Germany (4)	1936–1999	1960–1976, 1984–1988	28 years (24/52)	Equestrian	6	0	2	8
6	Colin Coates	Australia	1946	1968–1988	20 years (18/38)	Speed skating	0	0	0	0
6	John Primrose	Canada	1942	1968–1976, 1984–1992	24 years (26/50)	Shooting	0	0	0	0
6	Jiří Pták	Czechoslovakia	1946	1968–1980, 1988–1992	24 years (22/46)	Rowing	0	0	0	0
6	Christilot Hanson-Boylen	/Canada	1947	1964–1976, 1984, 1992	28 years (17/45)	Equestrian	0	0	0	0
6	Alfred Eder	Austria	1953	1976–1994	18 years (23/41)	Biathlon	0	0	0	0
6	Marja-Liisa Kirvesniemi-Hämäläinen	Finland	1955	1976–1994	18 years (21/39)	Cross-country skiing	3	0	4	7
6	Hugo Simon	Austria	1942	1972–1976, 1984–1996	24 years (30/53)	Equestrian	0	1	0	1
6	Luis Álvarez de Cervera	Spain/ Spain/Spain	1947	1972–1976, 1984–1996	24 years (25/49)	Equestrian	0	0	0	0
6	Eric Swinkels	Netherlands	1949	1972–1976, 1984–1996	24 years (23/47)	Shooting	0	1	0	1
6	Anastasios Bountouris	Greece (1976) / Greece	1955	1976–1996	20 years (21/41)	Sailing	0	0	1	1
6	Tessa Sanderson	Great Britain	1956	1976–1996	20 years (20/40)	Athletics	1	0	0	1
6	John Foster, Sr	United States Virgin Islands	1938	1972–1976, 1984–1992 (S) + 1988 (W)	20 years (34/54)	Bobsleigh (1) and sailing (5)	0	0	0	0
6	Harri Kirvesniemi	Finland	1958	1980–1998	18 years (21/39)	Cross-country skiing	0	0	6	6
6	Jochen Behle	West Germany (3) and Germany (3)	1960	1980–1998	18 years (19/37)	Cross-country skiing	0	0	0	0
6	Christine Stückelberger	Switzerland	1947	1972–1976, 1984–1988, 1996–2000	28 years (25/53)	Equestrian	1	3	1	5
6	Nonka Matova	/Bulgaria	1954	1976–1980, 1988–2000	24 years (22/46)	Shooting	0	1	0	1
6	Jochen Schümann	East Germany (3) and Germany (3)	1954	1976–1980, 1988–2000	24 years (22/46)	Sailing	3	1	0	4
6	Juan Giha, Jr.	Peru	1955	1980–2000	20 years (25/45)	Shooting	0	1	0	1
6	Philippe Boccara	France (4) and United States (2)	1959	1980–2000	20 years (21/41)	Canoeing	0	0	1	1
6	Manuel Estiarte	Spain/Spain	1961	1980–2000	20 years (18/38)	Water polo	1	1	0	2
6	Angelo Mazzoni	Italy	1961	1980–2000	20 years (19/39)	Fencing	2	0	1	3
6	Terry McHugh	Ireland	1963	1988–2000 (S) + 1992, 1998 (W)	12 years (25/37)	Athletics (4) and bobsleigh (2)	0	0	0	0
6	Michael Dixon	Great Britain	1962	1984–2002	18 years (22/40)	Biathlon (5) and cross-country skiing (1)	0	0	0	0
6	Raimo Helminen	Finland	1964	1984–2002	18 years (19/37)	Ice hockey	0	1	2	3
6	Markus Prock	Austria	1964	1984–2002	18 years (19/37)	Luge	0	2	1	3
6	Emese Hunyady	Hungary (1) and Austria (5)	1966	1984–2002	18 years (17/35)	Speed skating	1	1	1	3
6	Harald Stenvaag	Norway	1953	1984–2004	20 years (31/51)	Shooting	0	1	1	2
6	Robert Dover	United States	1956	1984–2004	20 years (28/48)	Equestrian	0	0	4	4
6	Colin Beashel	Australia	1959	1984–2004	20 years (24/44)	Sailing	0	0	1	1
6	Torben Grael	Brazil	1960	1984–2004	20 years (24/44)	Sailing	2	1	2	5
6	Wang Yifu	China	1960	1984–2004	20 years (24/44)	Shooting	2	3	1	6
6	Birgit Fischer	East Germany (2) and Germany (4)	1962	1980, 1988–2004	24 years (18/42)	Canoeing	8	4	0	12
6	Sorin Babii	Socialist Republic of Romania (2) and Romania (4)	1963	1984–2004	20 years (20/40)	Shooting	1	0	1	2
6	Elisabeta Oleniuc Lipă	Socialist Republic of Romania (2) and Romania (4)	1964	1984–2004	20 years (20/40)	Rowing	5	2	1	8
6	Agathi Kassoumi	Greece	1966	1984–2004	20 years (18/38)	Shooting	0	0	0	0
6	Georg Hackl	West Germany (1) and Germany (5)	1966	1988–2006	18 years (21/39)	Luge	3	2	0	5
6	Sergei Tchepikov	Soviet Union (1), Unified Team (1) and Russia (4)	1967	1988–2006	18 years (21/39)	Biathlon (5) and cross-country skiing (1)	2	3	1	6
6	Gerda Weissensteiner	Italy	1969	1988–2006	18 years (19/37)	Bobsleigh (2) and luge (4)	1	0	1	2
6	Wilfried Huber	Italy	1970	1988–2006	18 years (17/35)	Luge	1	0	0	1
6	Kateřina Neumannová	Czechoslovakia (1) and Czech Republic (5)	1973	1992–2006 (W) + 1996 (S)	14 years (18/32)	Cross-country skiing (5) and cycling mountain bike (1)	1	4	1	6
6	Susan Nattrass	Canada	1950	1976, 1988–1992, 2000–2008	32 years (25/57)	Shooting	0	0	0	0
6	Kyra Kyrklund	Finland	1951	1980–1996, 2008	28 years (29/57)	Equestrian	0	0	0	0
6	Ilario Di Buò	Italy	1956	1984–1992, 2000–2008	24 years (27/51)	Archery	0	2	0	2
6	Juha Hirvi	Finland	1960	1988–2008	20 years (28/48)	Shooting	0	1	0	1
6	Andrea Benelli	Italy	1960	1988–2008	20 years (28/48)	Shooting	1	0	1	2
6	Tanyu Kiryakov	/Bulgaria	1963	1988–2008	20 years (25/45)	Shooting	2	0	1	3
6	Juan Esteban Curuchet	Argentina	1965	1984–1988, 1996–2008	24 years (19/43)	Track cycling	1	0	0	1
6	James Tomkins	Australia	1965	1988–2008	20 years (23/42)	Rowing	3	0	1	4
6	Fabienne Diato-Pasetti	Monaco	1965	1988–2008	20 years (22/42)	Shooting	0	0	0	0
6	Jüri Jaanson	Soviet Union (1) and Estonia (5)	1965	1988–2008	20 years (22/42)	Rowing	0	2	0	2
6	Václav Chalupa	Czechoslovakia (2) and Czech Republic (4)	1967	1988–2008	20 years (20/40)	Rowing	0	1	0	1
6	João N'Tyamba	Angola	1968	1988–2008	20 years (20/40)	Athletics	0	0	0	0
6	Maria Mutola	Mozambique	1972	1988–2008	20 years (15/35)	Athletics	1	0	1	2
6	Ilmārs Bricis	Latvia	1970	1992–2010	18 years (21/39)	Biathlon	0	0	0	0
6	Marco Büchel	Liechtenstein	1971	1992–2010	18 years (20/38)	Alpine skiing	0	0	0	0
6	Andrus Veerpalu	Estonia	1971	1992–2010	18 years (21/39)	Cross-country skiing	2	1	0	3
6	Anna Orlova	Latvia	1972	1992–2010	18 years (19/37)	Luge	0	0	0	0
6	Evgeniya Radanova	Bulgaria	1977	1994–2010 (W) + 2004 (S)	16 years (16/32)	Speed skating (5) and track cycling (1)	0	2	1	3
6	Guillermo Alfredo Torres	Cuba	1959	1980, 1992–2004, 2012	32 years (21/53)	Shooting	0	0	0	0
6	**Mary Thomson-King**	United Kingdom	1961	1992–2012	20 years (31/51)	Equestrian	0	2	1	3
6	**Andrew Nicholson**	New Zealand	1961	1984, 1992–1996, 2004–2012	28 years (23/51)	Equestrian	0	1	2	3
6	**Russell Mark**	Australia	1964	1988–2000, 2008–2012	24 years (24/48)	Shooting	1	1	0	2
6	Thomas Farnik	Austria	1967	1992–2012	20 years (25/45)	Shooting	0	0	0	0
6	**Sergey Martynov**	Soviet Union (1) and /Belarus (5)	1968	1988, 1996–2012	24 years (20/42)	Shooting	1	0	2	3
6	Štěpánka Hilgertová	Czechoslovakia (1) and Czech Republic (5)	1968	1992–2012	20 years (24/44)	Canoeing	2	0	0	2
6	Hugo Hoyama	Brazil	1969	1992–2012	20 years (23/43)	Table tennis	0	0	0	0
6	Mönkhbayar Dorjsurengiin	Mongolia (3) and Germany (3)	1969	1992–2012	20 years (23/43)	Shooting	0	0	2	2
6	Natalia Valeeva	Unified Team (1), Moldova (1) and Italy (4)	1969	1992–2012	20 years (22/42)	Archery	0	0	2	2
6	Fredrik Lööf	Sweden	1969	1992–2012	20 years (22/42)	Sailing	1	0	2	3
6	Alessandra Sensini	Italy	1970	1992–2012	20 years (22/42)	Sailing	1	1	2	4
6	Nicoleta Grădinaru-Grasu	Romania	1971	1992–2012	20 years (20/40)	Athletics	0	0	0	0
6	Dragutin Topić	Independent Olympic Participants (1), Serbia and Montenegro (3) and Serbia (2)	1971	1992–2012	20 years (21/41)	Athletics	0	0	0	0
6	Alison Williamson	United Kingdom	1971	1992–2012	20 years (20/40)	Archery	0	0	1	1
6	**Michael Diamond**	Australia	1972	1992–2012	20 years (20/40)	Shooting	2	0	0	2
6	Iztok Čop	Slovenia	1972	1992–2012	20 years (20/40)	Rowing	1	1	2	4
6	Clara Hughes	Canada	1972	1996–2000, 2012 (S) + 2002–2010 (W)	16 years (22/38)	Road cycling (3) and speed skating (3)	1	1	4	6
6	Stuart O'Grady	Australia	1973	1992–2012	20 years (19/39)	Road cycling (4) and track cycling (4)	1	1	2	4
6	Franck Dumoulin	France	1973	1992–2012	20 years (19/39)	Shooting	1	0	0	1
6	Yordan Yovchev	Bulgaria	1973	1992–2012	20 years (19/39)	Gymnastics	0	1	3	4
6	Lars Frölander	Sweden	1974	1992–2012	20 years (18/38)	Swimming	1	2	0	3
6	Yevgeniya Artamonova	Unified Team (1) and Russia (5)	1975	1992–2012	20 years (17/37)	Volleyball	0	3	0	3
6	Kanstantsin Lukashyk	Unified Team (1) and /Belarus (5)	1975	1992–2012	20 years (16/36)	Shooting	1	0	0	1
6	**Derya Büyükuncu**	Turkey	1976	1992–2012	20 years (16/36)	Swimming	0	0	0	0
6	**Hubertus Von Hohenlohe**	Mexico	1959	1984–1994, 2010–2014	30 years (25/55)	Alpine skiing	0	0	0	0
6	Teemu Selänne	Finland	1970	1992, 1998–2014	22 years (21/43)	Ice hockey	0	1	3	4
6	Ole Einar Bjørndalen	Norway	1974	1994–2014	20 years (20/40)	Biathlon (6) and cross-country skiing (1)	8	4	2	14
6	Armin Zöggeler	Italy	1974	1994–2014	20 years (20/40)	Luge	2	1	3	6
6	Todd Lodwick	United States	1976	1994–2014	20 years (17/37)	Nordic combined	0	1	0	1
6	Mario Stecher	Austria	1977	1994–2014	20 years (16/36)	Nordic combined	2	0	2	4
6	Lee Kyou-hyuk	//South Korea	1978	1994–2014	20 years (15/35)	Speed skating	0	0	0	0
6	Hayley Wickenheiser	Canada	1978	1998–2014 (W) + 2000 (S)	16 years (19/35)	Ice hockey (5) and softball (1)	4	1	0	5
6	**John Whitaker**	United Kingdom	1955	1984, 1992–2000, 2008, 2016	32 years (29/61)	Equestrian	0	1	0	1
6	**Lalita Yauhleuskaya**	/Belarus (2) and Australia (4)	1963	1996–2016	20 years (32/52)	Shooting	0	0	1	1
6	**Fehaid Al-Deehani**	Kuwait	1966	1992–2004, 2012–2016	24 years (25/59)	Shooting	1	0	2	3
6	**Emil Milev**	Bulgaria (4) and United States (2)	1968	1992–2004, 2012–2016	24 years (24/48)	Shooting	0	1	0	1
6	**Nasser Al-Attiyah**	Qatar	1970	1996–2016	20 years (25/45)	Shooting	0	0	1	1
6	Stevan Pletikosić	Independent Olympic Participants (1), Serbia and Montenegro (3) and Serbia (2)	1972	1992–2008, 2016	24 years (20/44)	Shooting	0	0	1	1
6	Daniel Nestor	Canada	1972	1996–2016	20 years (23/43)	Tennis	1	0	0	1
6	Sergey Tetyukhin	Russia	1975	1996–2016	20 years (20/40)	Volleyball	1	1	2	4
6	Vladimir Samsonov	/Belarus	1976	1996–2016	20 years (20/40)	Table tennis	0	0	0	0
6	**Áron Gádorfalvi**	Hungary	1976	1996–2016	20 years (19/39)	Sailing	0	0	0	0
6	**Therese Alshammar**	Sweden	1977	1996–2016	20 years (18/38)	Swimming	0	2	1	3
6	**Maksym Oberemko**	Ukraine (5) and Russia (1)	1978	1996–2016	20 years (18/38)	Sailing	0	0	0	0
6	**Kim Rhode**	United States	1979	1996–2016	20 years (17/37)	Shooting	3	1	2	6
6	**Rolf-Göran Bengtsson**	Sweden	1962	1996, 2004–2016, 2024	28 years (34/62)	Equestrian	0	2	0	2
6	**Ramzy Al-Duhami**	Saudi Arabia	1972	1996–2012, 2024	28 years (24/52)	Equestrian	0	0	1	1
6	**Steffen Peters**	United States	1964	1996–2024	28 years (31/59)	Equestrian	0	1	2	3
6	Jasey-Jay Anderson	Canada	1975	1998–2018	20 years (23/43)	Snowboarding	1	0	0	1
6	Hannu Manninen	Finland	1978	1994–2010, 2018	24 years (15/39)	Cross-country skiing (1) and Nordic combined (6)	1	1	1	3
6	Éva Tófalvi	Romania	1978	1998–2018	20 years (20/40)	Biathlon	0	0	0	0
6	**Alla Tsuper**	Ukraine (1) and /Belarus (5)	1979	1998–2018	20 years (18/38)	Freestyle skiing	1	0	0	1
6	Shiva Keshavan	India (5) and Independent Olympic Participants (1)	1981	1998–2018	20 years (16/36)	Luge	0	0	0	0
6	Choi Heung-chul	/South Korea	1981	1998–2018	20 years (16/36)	Ski jumping	0	0	0	0
6	Choi Seou	/South Korea	1982	1998–2018	20 years (15/35)	Ski jumping	0	0	0	0
6	Kim Hyun-ki	/South Korea	1983	1998–2018	20 years (14/34)	Ski jumping	0	0	0	0
6	**Mary Hanna**	Australia	1954	1996–2004, 2012–2020	25 years (42/67)	Equestrian	0	0	0	0
6	**Jian Fang Lay**	Australia	1973	2000–2020	21 years (27/48)	Table tennis	0	0	0	0
6	**Evangelia Psarra**	Greece	1974	2000–2020	21 years (26/47)	Archery	0	0	0	0
6	**David Kostelecký**	Czech Republic	1975	1996–2000, 2008–2020	25 years (21/46)	Shooting	1	1	0	2
6	**Aleksey Alipov**	Russia (5) and ROC (1)	1975	2000–2020	21 years (25/46)	Shooting	1	0	1	2
6	**Marco de Nicolo**	Italy	1976	2000–2020	21 years (23/44)	Shooting	0	0	0	0
6	**Tatiana Drozdovskaya**	/Belarus	1978	2000–2020	21 years (21/42)	Sailing	0	0	0	0
6	**Ken Terauchi**	/Japan	1980	1996–2008, 2016–2020	25 years (15/40)	Diving	0	0	0	0
6	**Fernanda Oliveira**	Brazil	1980	2000–2020	21 years (19/40)	Sailing	0	0	1	1
6	**Viktoria Chaika**	/Belarus	1980	2000–2020	21 years (19/40)	Shooting	0	0	0	0
6	**Ronald Rauhe**	Germany	1981	2000–2020	21 years (19/40)	Canoeing	2	1	2	5
6	**Erik Vlček**	Slovakia	1981	2000–2020	21 years (18/39)	Canoeing	0	2	2	4
6	**Liu Jia**	Austria	1982	2000–2020	21 years (18/39)	Table tennis	0	0	0	0
6	Oussama Mellouli	Tunisia	1984	2000–2020	21 years (16/37)	Marathon swimming (2) and swimming (5)	2	0	1	3
6	**Ni Xialian**	Luxembourg	1963	2000, 2008–2024	24 years (37/61)	Table tennis	0	0	0	0
6	**Lee Chae-won**	/South Korea	1981	2002–2022	20 years (21/41)	Cross-country skiing	0	0	0	0
6	**Edson Bindilatti**	Brazil	1979	2002–2006, 2014–2026	20 years (26/46)	Bobsleigh	0	0	0	0
6	**Bat-Ochiryn Ser-Od**	Mongolia	1981	2004–2024	20 years (22/42)	Athletics	0	0	0	0
6	**Chuang Chih-yuan**	Chinese Taipei	1981	2004–2024	20 years (23/43)	Table tennis	0	0	0	0
6	**Tõnu Endrekson**	Estonia	1979	2004–2024	20 years (25/45)	Rowing	0	1	1	2
6	Rudy Fernández	Spain	1985	2004–2024	20 years (19/39)	Basketball	0	2	1	3
6	**Panagiotis Gionis**	Greece	1980	2004–2024	20 years (24/44)	Table tennis	0	0	0	0
6	**Steve Guerdat**	Switzerland	1982	2004–2024	20 years (22/42)	Equestrian	1	1	1	3
6	**Pablo Herrera Allepuz**	Spain	1982	2004–2024	20 years (22/42)	Beach volleyball	0	0	0	0
6	Nikola Karabatić	France	1984	2004–2024	20 years (20/40)	Handball	3	1	0	4
6	**Kristel Köbrich**	Chile	1985	2004–2024	20 years (18/38)	Swimming	0	0	0	0
6	**Olena Kostevych**	Ukraine	1985	2004–2024	20 years (19/39)	Shooting	1	0	3	4
6	Mijaín López Núñez	Cuba	1982	2004–2024	20 years (21/41)	Wrestling	5	0	0	5
6	**Marta**	Brazil	1986	2004–2024	20 years (18/38)	Football	0	3	0	3
6	**Takaharu Furukawa**	Japan	1984	2004–2024	20 years (20/39)	Archery	0	1	2	3
6	Diana Taurasi	United States	1982	2004–2024	20 years (22/42)	Basketball	6	0	0	6
6	**McLain Ward**	United States	1975	2004–2024	20 years (28/48)	Equestrian	2	3	0	5
6	**Alessandro Pittin**	Italy	1990	2006–2026	20 years (16/36)	Nordic combined	0	0	1	1
6	Akito Watabe	Japan	1988	2006–2026	20 years (17/37)	Ski jumping	0	2	2	4
6	Martina Sáblíková	Czech Republic	1987	2006–2026	20 years (18/38)	Speed skating	3	2	2	7
6	Kamil Stoch	Poland	1987	2006–2026	20 years (18/38)	Ski jumping	3	0	1	4
6	**Arianna Fontana**	Italy	1990	2006–2026	20 years (15/35)	Short track speed skating	3	6	5	14
6	**Queralt Castellet**	Spain	1989	2006–2026	20 years (16/36)	Snowboarding	0	1	0	1
6	**Andreas Prommegger**	Austria	1980	2006–2026	20 years (24/44)	Snowboarding	0	0	0	0
6	**Jozef Ninis**	Slovakia	1981	2006–2026	20 years (23/43)	Luge	0	0	0	0

== Athletes with at least five Olympic appearances ==
1012 athletes have competed in at least five Olympic Games (1021 if the 1906 Games are counted) between 1896 and 2026 inclusive. They are listed here, grouped by discipline. The columns labelled 'N+' denote the number of athletes who have competed in at least N Olympics. The number of male and female athletes who have competed in at least five Olympics are also listed, in the columns labelled 'M' and 'F'.

Athletes who have competed in more than one sport are counted once per sport.

Discipline	5+	M	F	6+	7+	Athletes
Shooting	134	109	25	47	13	10: Nino Salukvadze, 9: Afanasijs Kuzmins, 8: Francisco Boza, Rajmond Debevec, Giovanni Pellielo, 7: Mariya Grozdeva, François Lafortune, Jr, Otryadyn Gündegmaa, Leuris Pupo, Abdullah Al-Rashidi, Ralf Schumann, Jasna Šekarić, Ragnar Skanåker, 6: Aleksey Alipov, Nasser Al-Attiyah, Sorin Babii, Andrea Benelli, Viktoria Chaika, Marco de Nicolo, Fehaid Al-Deehani, Michael Diamond, Fabienne Diato-Pasetti, Mönkhbayar Dorjsurengiin, Franck Dumoulin, Thomas Farnik, Juan Giha, Jr., Juha Hirvi, Agathi Kassoumi, Tanyu Kiryakov, David Kostelecký, Olena Kostevych, Kanstantsin Lukashyk, Russell Mark, Sergey Martynov, Nonka Matova, William McMillan, Emil Milev, Susan Nattrass, Stevan Pletikošić, John Primrose, Kim Rhode, Adam Smelczyński, Harald Stenvaag, Eric Swinkels, Guillermo Torres, Wang Yifu, Lalita Yauhleuskaya, 5: Hans Aasnæs, Georgios Achilleos, Alister Allan, Jean-Pierre Amat, Danka Barteková, Abhinav Bindra, Gilmour Boa, Gabriele Bühlmann, Derek Burnett, Chiara Cainero, Danilo Caro, João Costa, Eglis Yaima Cruz, Svetlana Demina, Dencho Denev, Yusuf Dikeç, Hennie Dompeling, Maik Eckhardt, Glenn Eller, Ennio Falco, Richard Faulds, Nedžad Fazlija, Alberto Fernández, María del Pilar Fernández Julián, Martin Gison, Jozef Gönci, Jorge González, Petar Gorša, Torben Grimmel, Durval Guimarães, Daina Gudzinevičiūtė, Vincent Hancock, Mostafa Hamdy, Andrei Inešin, Vladimir Isakov, Harald Jensen, Jin Jong-oh, Artyom Khadjibekov, Mohamed Khorshed, Boris Kokorev, Sergei Kovalenko, Szilárd Kun, Jacques Lafortune, Lee Eun-chul, Lin Yi-chun, Pentti Linnosvuo, Lars Jørgen Madsen, Goran Maksimović, Saeed bin Maktoum bin Rashid Al Maktoum, Anton Manolov, Michael Maskell, John McNally, Damir Mikec, Nemanja Mirosavljev, Saeed Al-Mutairi, Yukie Nakayama, Sonja Pfeilschifter, Warren Potent, Tanyaporn Prucksakorn, Iulian Raicea, João Rebelo, Christian Reitz, Daniel Repacholi, Firmo Roberti, Ralph Rodríguez, Francisco Romero Arribas, Galliano Rossini, Nicolae Rotaru, Peter Rull, Sr., Ricardo Rusticucci, Juan Seguí, Péter Sidi, Karni Singh, Randhir Singh, Attila Solti, Tan Zongliang, Alexandros Theophilakis, Ioannis Theofilakis, Joan Tomàs, Torsten Ullman, Eladio Vallduvi, Paul Van Asbroeck, Wolfram Waibel, Sr., Axel Wegner, Wu Tao-yuan, Vilho Ylönen, Józef Zapędzki
Athletics	101	52	49	11	3	8: Jesús Ángel García Bragado, 7: Merlene Ottey, Mélina Robert-Michon, 6: Bat-Ochiryn Ser-Od, Nicoleta Grădinaru-Grasu, Lia Manoliu, Terry McHugh, Maria Mutola, João N'Tyamba, Tessa Sanderson, Dragutin Topić, 5: Abdihakem Abdirahman, Amy Acuff, Valerie Kasanita Adams, Virgilijus Alekna, Christine Amertil, Eşref Apak, Kelly-Ann Baptiste, Toni Bernadó, Tim Berrett, Gilbert Bessi, Kévin Borlée, Sabine Braun, Chris Brown, Ana Cabecinha, Veronica Campbell-Brown, Frank Casañas, Kim Collins, Willie Davenport, Pauline Davis-Thompson, Giovanni De Benedictis, Gail Devers-Roberts, Fabrizio Donato, Jackie Edwards, Laverne Eve, Susana Feitor, Allyson Felix, Debbie Ferguson-McKenzie, Olga Fikotová, Shelly-Ann Fraser-Pryce, Sébastien Gattuso, Glenroy Gilbert, Vladimir Golubnichy, Gong Lijiao, András Haklits, Rob Heffernan, Liu Hong, Max Houben, Olivera Jevtić, Helalia Johannes, Eliud Kipchoge, Bernard Lagat, Ivet Lalova-Collio, Li Ling, John Ljunggren, Chris Maddocks, Zalina Marghieva, Paul Martin, Churandy Martina, Fiona May, Fionnuala McCormack, Pietro Mennea, Mathias Ntawulikura, Alex Oakley, Érika Olivera, Mary Onyali-Omagbemi, Abdon Pamich, Alexandros Papadimitriou, Jo Pavey, Jefferson Pérez, Fernanda Ribeiro, Sandie Richards, Carlos Sala, Martin Schützenauer, Natalia Semenova, Janusz Sidło, Lidia Șimon, Trine Solberg-Hattestad, Ivana Španović, Barbora Špotáková, Chandra Sturrup, Irena Szewińska-Kirszenstein, Aleksander Tammert, Igor Ter-Ovanesyan, Donald Thomas, Dragana Tomašević, Matej Tóth, Ivan Tsikhan, María Vasco, João Vieira, Urs von Wartburg, Eva Vrabcová-Nývltová, Letitia Vriesde, Nick Willis, Willye White, Anita Włodarczyk, Irina Yatchenko, Jan Železný, Szymon Ziółkowski, Branko Zorko, Ellina Zvereva
Equestrian	77	59	18	36	17	10: Ian Millar, 8: Piero d'Inzeo, Raimondo d'Inzeo, Andrew Hoy, Rodrigo Pessoa, 7: Ludger Beerbaum, Karin Donckers, Phillip Dutton, Anky van Grunsven, Carl Hester, Jos Lansink, Michael Plumb, Nick Skelton, Taizo Sugitani, Mark Todd, Tinne Vilhelmson-Silfvén, Isabell Werth, 6: Luis Álvarez, Frank Chapot, Robert Dover, Ramzy Al-Duhami, Jim Elder, Rolf-Göran Bengtsson, Steve Guerdat, Mary Hanna, Christilot Hanson-Boylen, Reiner Klimke, Kyra Kyrklund, Andrew Nicholson, Steffen Peters, Hugo Simon, Christine Stückelberger, Mary Thomson-King, McLain Ward, John Whitaker, Hans Günter Winkler, 5: Linda Algotsson, Alessandro Argenton, Kamal Bahamdan, David Bárcena Ríos, Malin Baryard-Johnsson, David Broome, Henrique Callado, Henri Chammartin, Carlos D'Elia, Dominique d'Esmé, Bruce Davidson, Peter Eriksson, Beatriz Ferrer-Salat, Gustav Fischer, William Fox-Pitt, Peder Fredricson, Markus Fuchs, Bruce Goodin, Nils Haagensen, Pierre Jonquères d'Oriola, André Jousseaumé, Ivan Kalita, Ingrid Klimke, José Maria Larocca, Bengt Ljungquist, Ben Maher, Graziano Mancinelli, Victoria Max-Theurer, Álvaro de Miranda Neto, Karen O'Connor, Nelson Pessoa, Bill Roycroft, Henri Saint Cyr, Ian Stark, Bill Steinkraus, Edwina Tops-Alexander, Manuel Torres, Nicolas Touzaint, Anne van Olst, Yoshiaki Oiwa, Michael Whitaker
Sailing	68	63	5	19	6	9: Hubert Raudaschl, 8: Paul Elvstrøm, Durward Knowles, 7: Santiago Lange, João Rodrigues, Robert Scheidt, 6: Colin Beashel, Anastasios Bountouris, Tatiana Drozdovskaya, Hans Fogh, John Foster, Sr, Áron Gádorfalvi, Torben Grael, Magnus Konow, Fredrik Lööf, Maksim Oberemko, Fernanda Oliveira, Jochen Schümann, Alessandra Sensini, 5: Ben Ainslie, Duarte Manuel Bello, Jean-Baptiste Bernaz, William Berntsen, Andreas Cariolou, Deniz Çınar, Reinaldo Conrad, Anton Dahlberg, Nick Dempsey, José Doreste, Carlos Espínola, Šime Fantela, Enrique Figueroa, Juan de la Fuente, Roland Gäbler, Mike Gebhardt, Nikola Girke, Ha Jee-min, Tore Holm, Allan Julie, Nikos Kaklamanakis, Barbara Kendall, Pavlos Kontides, Andreas Kosmatopoulos, Willi Kuhweide, Mateusz Kusznierewicz, Jacques Baptiste Lebrun, Gustavo Lima, Ross MacDonald, Juan Ignacio Maegli, Michal Maier, Makoto Tomizawa, Stuart McNay, Konstantin Melgunov, David Mier, Mark Neeleman, Aimilios Papathanasiou, Tony Philp, Timir Pinegin, Xavier Rohart, Jorge Alberto Salas Chávez, Ricardo Santos, Fyodor Shutkov, Roberto Sieburger, Hans Spitzauer, Agostino Straulino, Peter Tallberg, David Wilkins, Vasilij Zbogar
Fencing	51	36	15	10	3	7: Aida Mohamed, Ivan Osiier, Kerstin Palm, 6: Norman Armitage, Aladár Gerevich, Bill Hoskyns, Angelo Mazzoni, Jerzy Pawłowski, Janice Romary, Edgar Seligman, 5: Albie Axelrod, Andrea Cassarà, Philippe Cattiau, Arie de Jong, Laura Flessel-Colovic, Antonio García, Martin Holt, Géza Imre, Allan Jay, Peter Joppich, Jenő Kamuti, Olga Kharlan, Pavel Kolobkov, Iván Kovács, Pál Kovács, Jacques Lefèvre, Rubén Limardo, Bengt Ljungquist, Tatiana Logunova, Peter Macken, Edoardo Mangiarotti, Gerek Meinhardt, Aldo Montano, Robert Montgomerie, Ellen Müller-Preis, Olga Orban-Szabo, Erwann Le Péchoux, Ana Maria Popescu, Stanislav Pozdnyakov, Ildikó Rejtő, Ecaterina Stahl-Iencic, Áron Szilágyi, Luigi Tarantino, Léon Tom, Giovanna Trillini, Valentina Vezzali, Joachim Wendt, Peter Westbrook, Ye Chong, Mariel Zagunis, Margherita Zalaffi
Cross-country skiing	51	31	20	12	2	8: Jaqueline Mourao, 7: Sergei Dolidovich, 6: Jochen Behle, Ole Einar Bjørndalen, Michael Dixon, Harri Kirvesniemi, Marja-Liisa Kirvesniemi-Hämäläinen, Lee Chae-won, Hannu Manninen, Kateřina Neumannová, Sergei Tchepikov, Andrus Veerpalu, 5: Martin Bajčičák, Ivan Bátory, Lukáš Bauer, Stefania Belmondo, Marit Bjørgen, Oddvar Brå, Maurilio De Zolt, Giorgio Di Centa, Manuela Di Centa, Aleksander Grajf, Juan Jesús Gutiérrez, Markus Hasler, Arturo Kinch, Jaak Mae, Jiří Magál, Oļegs Maļuhins, Masako Ishida, Torgny Mogren, Andrew Musgrave, Kateřina Nash, Krista Pärmäkoski, Gabriella Paruzzi, Paul Pepene, Gianfranco Polvara, Alena Procházková, Alexey Prokurorov, Kikkan Randall, Riitta-Liisa Roponen, Valentyna Shevchenko, Raisa Smetanina, Kristina Šmigun-Vähi, Alois Stadlober, Indrek Tobreluts, Athanassios Tsakiris, Fulvio Valbusa, Sabina Valbusa, Giorgio Vanzetta, Yelena Volodina-Antonova, Eva Vrabcová-Nývltová
Rowing	41	29	12	10	3	8: Lesley Thompson, 7: Ekaterina Khodatovich-Karsten, Olaf Tufte, 6: Václav Chalupa, Iztok Čop, Tõnu Endrekson, Jüri Jaanson, Elisabeta Oleniuc Lipă, Jiří Pták, James Tomkins, 5: Jack Beresford, Kathrin Boron, Mikołaj Burda, Daisaku Takeda, Rumyana Dzhadzharova-Neykova, Eskild Ebbesen, Anthony Edwards, Rossano Galtarossa, Elena Georgescu-Nedelcu, Katherine Grainger, Marcel Hacker, Frances Houghton, Doina Ignat, Pertti Karppinen, Marek Kolbowicz, Adam Korol, Raffaello Leonardo, Yuriy Lorentsson, Aleksandr Lukyanov, Oleh Lykov, Mike McKay, Constanţa Pipotă-Burcică, Allar Raja, Steve Redgrave, Nico Rienks, Alessio Sartori, Diederik Simon, Luka Špik, Viorica Susanu, Emma Twigg, Simone Venier
Table tennis	38	23	15	13	6	7: Timo Boll, Olufunke Oshonaike, Jörgen Persson, Zoran Primorac, Jean-Michel Saive, Segun Toriola, 6: Chuang Chih-yuan, Panagiotis Gionis, Hugo Hoyama, Jian Fang Lay, Liu Jia, Ni Xialian, Vladimir Samsonov, 5: Tiago Apolónia, Csilla Bátorfi, Patrick Chila, Adrian Crișan, Offiong Edem, Marcos Freitas, Andrej Gaćina, Bose Kaffo, Sharath Kamal, Aleksandar Karakašević, Nanthana Komwong, Petr Korbel, Kalinikos Kreanga, Ilija Lupulesku, Dimitrij Ovtcharov, Viktoria Pavlovich, Georgina Póta, Fabiola Ramos, Jörg Roßkopf, Elizabeta Samara, Elke Schall, Werner Schlager, Krisztina Tóth, Jan-Ove Waldner, Mo Zhang
Canoeing	38	25	13	7	1	8: Josefa Idem-Guerrini, 7: Teresa Portela, 6: Philippe Boccara, Birgit Fischer, Štěpánka Hilgertová, Ronald Rauhe, Erik Vlček, 5: Agneta Andersson, Beniamino Bonomi, Grayson Bourne, Caroline Brunet, Maialen Chourraut, Saúl Craviotto, Natasa Dusev-Janics, Ian Ferguson, David Ford, Cristina Giai Pron, Dennis Green, Luuka Jones, Zoltán Kammerer, Peter Kauzer, Aneta Konieczna, Martin Marinov, Michal Martikán, Helmut Oblinger, Anna Olsson, Markus Oscarsson, Inna Osypenko-Radomska, Ivan Patzaichin, Adrian Powell, Teresa Portela, Clint Robinson, Antonio Rossi, Emanuel Silva, Michał Śliwiński, Takuya Haneda, Andrew Train, Stephen Train
Swimming	35	14	21	5	0	6: Therese Alshammar, Derya Büyükuncu, Lars Frölander, Kristel Köbrich, Oussama Mellouli, 5: Alia Atkinson, Stephanie Au, Cecilia Biagioli, George Bovell, Kirsty Coventry, László Cseh, João Gonçalves Filho, Mark Foster, Spyros Gianniotis, Katinka Hosszú, Mette Jacobsen, Zsuzsanna Jakabos, Boglárka Kapás, Paweł Korzeniowski, Peter Mankoč, Martina Moravcová, Jeanette Ottesen, María Peláez, Federica Pellegrini, Michael Phelps, Carl Probert, Paul Radmilovic, Rogério Romero, Hanna-Maria Seppälä, Alison Sheppard, Sarah Sjöström, Dara Torres, Evelyn Verrasztó, Katarzyna Wasick, Nina Zhivanevskaya
Bobsleigh	28	24	4	5	0	6: Edson Bindilatti, Carl-Erik Eriksson, John Foster, Sr, Terry McHugh, Gerda Weissensteiner, 5: Gilbert Bessi, Jorge Bonnet, Lascelles Brown, Willie Davenport, Susi Erdmann, Sébastien Gattuso, Glenroy Gilbert, Prince Albert II of Monaco, András Haklits, Max Houben, Kaillie Humphries, Jan Kobián, Dawid Kupczyk, Kevin Kuske, Pierre Lueders, Elana Meyers Taylor, Bruno Mingeon, Bogdan Musioł, Martin Schützenauer, Brian Shimer, Hiroshi Suzuki, Léon Tom, Alexandr Zubkov
Luge	28	21	7	9	1	7: Albert Demchenko, 6: Georg Hackl, Wilfried Huber, Shiva Keshavan, Jozef Ninis, Anna Orlova, Markus Prock, Gerda Weissensteiner, Armin Zöggeler, 5: Anne Abernathy, Valentin Crețu, Sergey Danilin, Susi Erdmann, Mark Grimmette, Oswald Haselrieder, Paul Hildgartner, Mária Jasenčáková, Felix Loch, Gerhard Plankensteiner, Hansjörg Raffl, Mārtiņš Rubenis, Markus Schiegl, Tobias Schiegl, Andris Šics, Juris Šics, Raluca Strămăturaru, Natalya Yakuchenko, Alexandr Zubkov
Biathlon	28	21	7	7	1	8: Jaqueline Mourao, 6: Ole Einar Bjørndalen, Ilmārs Bricis, Michael Dixon, Alfred Eder, Sergei Tchepikov, Éva Tófalvi, 5: Andriy Deryzemlya, Uschi Disl, Simon Eder, Jakov Fak, Aleksander Grajf, Ludwig Gredler, Ricco Groß, Halvard Hanevold, Martina Jašicová-Halinárová, Lukas Hofer, Vladimir Iliev, Roland Lessing, Oļegs Maļuhins, Janez Ožbolt, Wilfried Pallhuber, Diana Rasimovičiūtė, Nathalie Santer-Bjørndalen, Valentyna Semerenko, Tomasz Sikora, Indrek Tobreluts, Athanassios Tsakiris
Alpine skiing	27	19	8	3	1	7: Sarah Schleper, 6: Marco Büchel, Hubertus von Hohenlohe, 5: Kjetil André Aamodt, Paul Accola, Graham Bell, Federica Brignone, Martina Ertl-Renz, Kristian Ghedina, Hur Seung-Wook, Christof Innerhofer, Kjetil Jansrud, Patrik Järbyn, Jung Dong-hyun, Aleksandr Khoroshilov, Arturo Kinch, Lasse Kjus, Bode Miller, Fredrik Nyberg, Dominik Paris, Tanja Poutiainen, Casey Puckett, María José Rienda, Dave Ryding, Maria Shkanova, Lindsey Vonn, Nino Tsiklauri
Speed skating	25	10	15	7	2	8: Claudia Pechstein, 7: Seiko Hashimoto, 6: Colin Coates, Clara Hughes, Emese Hunyady, Lee Kyou-hyuk, Martina Sáblíková, 5: Katarzyna Bachleda-Curuś, Patrick Beckert, Jan Bos, Natalia Czerwonka, Edel Therese Høiseth, Bob de Jong, Sven Kramer, Christa Luding-Rothenburger, Valérie Maltais, Tomomi Okazaki, Monika Pflug, Rintje Ritsma, Örjan Sandler, Roberto Sighel, Maki Tabata, Bart Veldkamp, Chris Witty, Ireen Wüst
Track cycling	22	13	9	5	2	7: Seiko Hashimoto, Jeannie Longo, 6: Juan Curuchet, Stuart O'Grady, Evgenia Radanova, 5: Judith Arndt, Azizulhasni Awang, Jan Bos, Greg Henderson, Shane Kelly, Roger Kluge, Simona Krupeckaitė, Daniela Larreal, Christa Luding-Rothenburger, Alexei Markov, Walter Pérez, Bruno Risi, Franz Stocher, Marianne Vos, Bradley Wiggins, Chris Witty, Wong Kam-po
Ice hockey	22	14	8	3	0	6: Raimo Helminen, Teemu Selänne, Hayley Wickenheiser, 5: Daniel Alfredsson, Andres Ambühl, Nicole Bullo, Roman Červenka, Pavel Datsyuk, Jayna Hefford, Dieter Hegen, Jenni Hiirikoski, Jaromír Jágr, Michelle Karvinen, Udo Kiessling, Ilya Kovalchuk, Jere Lehtinen, Denis Perez, Marie-Philip Poulin, Karoliina Rantamäki, Emma Terho, Petter Thoresen, Kimmo Timonen
Water polo	21	21	0	1	0	6: Manuel Estiarte, 5: Georgios Afroudakis, Tony Azevedo, Tibor Benedek, Gianni De Magistris, Pietro Figlioli, Xavier García, Salvador Gómez, João Gonçalves Filho, Dezső Gyarmati, Igor Hinić, Maro Joković, Tamás Kásás, George Mavrotas, Felipe Perrone, Paul Radmilovic, Jesús Rollán, Jordi Sans, Jesse Smith, Stefano Tempesti, Dénes Varga
Snowboarding	18	9	9	5	2	7: Roland Fischnaller, Tomoka Takeuchi, 6: Jasey-Jay Anderson, Queralt Castellet, Andreas Prommegger, 5: Nick Baumgartner, Cai Xuetong, Kelly Clark, Annamari Dancha, Ayumu Hirano, Lindsey Jacobellis, Scotty James, Benjamin Karl, Liu Jiayu, Rok Marguč, Claudia Riegler, Faye Thelen, Shaun White
Freestyle skiing	15	7	8	1	0	6: Alla Tsuper, 5: Oleksandr Abramenko, Dmitri Dashinski, Yuliya Galysheva, Aleksei Grishin, Janne Lahtela, Lydia Lassila, Katrin Ofner, Casey Puckett, Qi Guangpu, Dmitriy Reiherd, Tae Satoya, Fanny Smith, Aiko Uemura, Xu Mengtao
Archery	14	9	5	5	0	6: Ilario Di Buò, Evangelia Psarra, Takaharu Furukawa, Natalia Valeeva, Alison Williamson, 5: Brady Ellison, Simon Fairweather, Giancarlo Ferrari, Naomi Folkard, Hiroshi Yamamoto, Butch Johnson, Khatuna Lorig, Mauro Nespoli, Tomi Poikolainen
Basketball	14	9	5	2	0	6: Rudy Fernández, Diana Taurasi, 5: Sue Bird, Teófilo Cruz, Teresa Edwards, Pau Gasol, Andrew Gaze, Joe Ingles, Lauren Jackson, Patty Mills, Juan Carlos Navarro, Adriana Moisés Pinto, Oscar Schmidt, Luis Scola
Tennis	14	9	5	2	1	7: Leander Paes, 6: Daniel Nestor, 5: Mahesh Bhupathi, Novak Djokovic, Sara Errani, Mark Knowles, Lu Yen-hsun, Max Mirnyi, Andy Murray, Kei Nishikori, Arantxa Sánchez Vicario, Samantha Stosur, Elena Vesnina, Venus Williams
Road cycling	13	7	6	3	1	7: Jeannie Longo, 6: Clara Hughes, Stuart O'Grady, 5: Judith Arndt, Roberta Bonanomi, Murilo Fischer, Greg Henderson, George Hincapie, Alejandro Valverde, Marianne Vos, Bradley Wiggins, Wong Kam-po, Trixi Worrack
Volleyball	13	6	7	2	0	6: Yevgeniya Artamonova, Sergey Tetyukhin, 5: Fofão, Andrea Giani, Maurício Lima, Eleonora Lo Bianco, Reinder Nummerdor, Maja Ognjenović, Bruno Rezende, Richard Schuil, Danielle Scott-Arruda, Lyubov Sokolova, Kerri Walsh Jennings
Handball	11	5	6	1	0	6: Nikola Karabatić, 5: Natália Bernardo, Azenaide Carlos, Michaël Guigou, Mikkel Hansen, Andrey Lavrov, Katrine Lunde, Oh Seong-Ok, Oh Yong-ran, Alexandra Priscila do Nascimento Martínez, Yoon Kyung-shin
Wrestling	10	9	1	1	0	6: Mijaín López Núñez, 5: Cris Brown, Wilfried Dietrich, Khorloogiin Bayanmönkh, Rıza Kayaalp, Czesław Kwieciński, George MacKenzie, Mariya Stadnik, Mario Tovar González, Ryszard Wolny
Diving	10	5	5	1	0	6: Ken Terauchi, 5: Franco Cagnotto, Tania Cagnotto, Tom Daley, Leong Mun Yee, Anna Lindberg, Dmitry Sautin, Niki Stajković, Juliana Veloso, Melissa Wu
Judo	9	3	6	0	0	5: Mayra Aguiar, Jorge Bonnet, Driulys González, Telma Monteiro, Idalys Ortiz, Mária Pekli, Teddy Riner, Ryoko Tamura-Tani, Robert Van de Walle
Nordic combined	9	9	0	5	0	6: Todd Lodwick, Hannu Manninen, Alessandro Pittin, Mario Stecher, Akito Watabe, 5: Christoph Bieler, Bill Demong, Felix Gottwald, Johannes Rydzek
Ski jumping	9	9	0	7	3	8: Noriaki Kasai, 7: Janne Ahonen, Simon Ammann, 6: Choi Heung-chul, Choi Seou, Kim Hyun-ki, Kamil Stoch, 5: Mackenzie Boyd-Clowes, Masahiko Harada
Field hockey	8	7	1	0	0	5: David Alegre, Pol Amat, Cédric Charlier, Félix Denayer, John-John Dohmen, Natascha Keller, Teun de Nooijer, Eddie Ockenden
Cycling mountain bike	8	3	5	2	1	8: Jaqueline Mourao, 6: Kateřina Neumannová, 5: Gunn-Rita Dahle Flesjå, Manuel Fumic, José Antonio Hermida, Kateřina Nash, Nino Schurter, Sabine Spitz
Gymnastics	7	4	3	2	1	8: Oksana Chusovitina, 6: Yordan Yovchev, 5: Marian Drăgulescu, Daniele Hypólito, Ekaterina Khilko, Heikki Savolainen, Josy Stoffel
Beach volleyball	7	4	3	1	0	6: Pablo Herrera Allepuz, 5: Natalie Cook, Laura Ludwig, Reinder Nummerdor, Emanuel Rego, Richard Schuil, Kerri Walsh Jennings
Weightlifting	7	4	3	0	0	5: Alexandra Escobar, Imre Földi, Eko Yuli Irawan, Hiromi Miyake, Ingo Steinhöfel, Dika Toua, Ronny Weller
Short track speed skating	5	2	3	2	0	6: Arianna Fontana, Evgenia Radanova, 5: Yuri Confortola, Charles Hamelin, Valérie Maltais
Figure skating	5	3	2	0	0	5: Evan Bates, Margarita Drobiazko, Aljona Savchenko, Povilas Vanagas, Zhang Hao
Curling	5	4	1	0	0	5: Niklas Edin, Oskar Eriksson, Torger Nergård, John Shuster, Denise Dupont
Marathon swimming	4	2	2	2	0	6: Kristel Köbrich, Oussama Mellouli, 5: Cecilia Biagioli, Spyros Gianniotis
Badminton	4	4	0	0	0	5: Pablo Abián, Kevin Cordón, Robert Mateusiak, Boonsak Ponsana
Skeleton	3	2	1	0	0	5: Martins Dukurs, Tomass Dukurs, Katie Uhlaender
Art competitions	3	3	0	1	0	6: Edgar Seligman, 5: Paul Martin, R. Tait McKenzie
Modern pentathlon	3	2	1	0	0	5: Laura Asadauskaitė, David Bárcena Ríos, Peter Macken
Football	2	0	2	2	1	7: Formiga, 6: Marta
Triathlon	2	0	2	0	0	5: Flora Duffy, Nicola Spirig
Taekwondo	1	1	0	0	0	5: Steven López
Synchronized swimming	1	0	1	0	0	5: Soňa Bernardová
Softball	1	0	1	1	0	6: Hayley Wickenheiser
Military patrol	1	1	0	0	0	5: Vilho Ylönen
Skateboarding	1	1	0	0	0	5: Ayumu Hirano

== Athletes with at least 5 uncertain Olympic appearances ==
These 26 athletes are listed here, grouped by discipline. The columns labelled 'N+' denote the number of athletes who have competed in at least N Olympics. The number of male and female athletes who have competed in at least five Olympics are also listed, in the columns labelled 'M' and 'F'. These athletes have at least one DNS in the Olympic and Olympedia websites or an appearance in a non-Olympic event.

Athletes who have competed in more than one sport are counted once per sport.

Discipline	5+	M	F	6+	7+	Athletes
Athletics	12	7	5	2	0	6: Kim Collins, João Vieira, 5: Yamilé Aldama, Géo André, Juliet Cuthbert, Svetla Dimitrova, Cydonie Mothersill, Théophile Nkounkou, Raoul Paoli, Voula Patoulidou, Don Quarrie, Gaston Roelants
Equestrian	3	2	1	2	1	7: Rolf-Göran Bengtsson, 6: Victoria Max-Theurer, 5: Stefano Brecciaroli
Short track speed skating	3	0	3	0	0	5: Sylvie Daigle, Amy Peterson, Nobuko Yamada
Football	3	0	3	0	0	5: Hedvig Lindahl, Tânia Maranhão, Ali Riley
Curling	2	1	1	1	0	6: Torger Nergård, 5: Dordi Nordby
Luge	1	0	1	1	0	6: Anne Abernathy
Fencing	1	0	1	0	0	5: Ana Derșidan-Ene-Pascu
Rowing	1	1	0	0	0	5: Raoul Paoli
Sailing	1	0	1	0	0	5: Jessica Crisp
Wrestling	1	1	0	0	0	5: Raoul Paoli

== Intercalated Games ==
The 1906 Intercalated Games are not considered 'official' Olympics, but medals were awarded.

The following athletes have appeared in at least 8 Olympics if 1906 Intercalated Games are included.

Athlete	Nation	Born/Death	Games	Period (age of 1st/last)	Sport	Gold medal	Silver medal	Bronze medal	Tot.
Edgar Seligman	United Kingdom	1867/1958	1896, 1906–1912, 1920–1932	36 years (29/65)	Fencing (6) and art competitions (2)	0	3	0	2

The following athletes have appeared in at least 6 Olympics if 1906 Intercalated Games are included.

Athlete	Nation	Born/Death	Games	Period (age of 1st/last)	Sport	Gold medal	Silver medal	Bronze medal	Tot.
Alexandros Theofilakis	Greece	1877/?	1896, 1906–1912, 1920–1924	28 years (19/47)	Shooting	0	2	0	2
Ioannis Theofilakis	Greece	1879/1968	1896, 1906–1912, 1920–1924	28 years (17/45)	Shooting	0	1	0	1
Adrianus de Jong	Netherlands	1882/1966	1906–1912, 1920–1928	22 years (23/45)	Fencing	0	0	5	5
Paul Radmilovic	Great Britain	1886/1968	1906–1912, 1920–1928	22 years (20/42)	Water polo (5) and swimming (3)	4	0	0	4

The following athletes have appeared in at least 5 Olympics if 1906 Intercalated Games are included.

Athlete	Nation	Born/Death	Games	Period (age of 1st/last)	Sport	Gold medal	Silver medal	Bronze medal	Tot.
Ladislav Žemla	Bohemia (3) and Czechoslovakia (2)	1887/1955	1906–1912, 1920–1924	18 years (19/37)	Tennis	0	0	1	1
Willem Hubert van Blijenburgh	Netherlands	1881/1936	1906–1912, 1920–1924	18 years (25/43)	Fencing	0	0	3	3
Jetze Doorman	Netherlands	1881/1931	1906–1912, 1920–1924	18 years (25/43)	Fencing (5) and modern pentathlon (1)	0	0	4	4
Fernand de Montigny	Belgium	1885/1974	1906–1912, 1920–1924	18 years (21/39)	Fencing (5) and field hockey (1)	0	2	3	5
Alfréd Hajós	Kingdom of Hungary	1878/1955	1896, 1906, 1924–1932	36 years (18/54)	Swimming (2) and art competitions (3)	2	1	0	3
Max Decugis	France	1882/1978	1900, 1906–1912, 1920	20 years (18/40)	Tennis (5)	4	1	1	6
Paul Vasseur	France	1884/1971	1900, 1906–1912, 1920	20 years (16/36)	Swimming (3) and water polo (3)	0	0	1	1
Paul Anspach	Belgium	1882/1981	1906–1912, 1920–1924	18 years (24/42)	Fencing (5)	2	2	1	5
Federico Cesarano	Italy	1886/1969	1906–1912, 1920–1924	18 years (20/38)	Fencing (4) and Shooting (1)	0	0	1	1

== Dual sport and multi-sport Olympians ==
Many Olympians have competed in two or more sports. These athletes are listed below, with the number of times they competed in each sport. Sometimes an individual has competed in two disciplines at the same Games; such instances are noted.

=== Summer and Winter Olympians ===
For all the athletes see: List of athletes who competed in both the Summer and Winter Olympic games

187 athletes competed in both Summer and Winter Olympics.

The most common combinations of disciplines are athletics/bobsleigh (51 competitors; summer and winter sports respectively), ice hockey (18 athletes: in the 1920 Summer Olympics there was exceptionally ice hockey, a typical winter sport) and speed skating/track cycling (12 athletes; winter and summer sports respectively).

Men that won medals in different sports
Women that won medals in different sports

Athlete	Country	Sports	First	Last	Tot.
Marcus Adam	United Kingdom	athletics 1, bobsleigh 1	1992	2002	2
Seun Adigun	Nigeria	athletics 1, bobsleigh 1	2012	2018	2
Sara Aerts	Belgium	athletics 1, bobsleigh 2	2012	2022	3
Derek Allhusen	United Kingdom	equestrian 1, winter pentathlon 1	1948	1968	2
Eddy Alvarez	United States	baseball 1, short track speed skating 1	2014	2020	2
Wilhelm Arwe	Sweden	ice hockey 2	1920	1924	2
Jorun Askersrud Nygaard	Norway	athletics 1, cross-country skiing 1	1952	1952	2
Ayumu Hirano	Japan	skateboarding 1, snowboarding 4	2014	2026	5
Bryan Barnett	Canada	athletics 1, bobsleigh 2	2008	2018	3
Timothy Beck	Netherlands	athletics 1, bobsleigh 1	2002	2004	2
Runald Beckman	Sweden	athletics 1, bobsleigh 1	1976	1980	2
Antonella Bellutti	Italy	bobsleigh 1, track cycling 2	1996	2002	3
Sven Bergqvist	Sweden	football 1, ice hockey 1	1936	1936	2
Gilbert Bessi	Monaco	athletics 1, bobsleigh 4	1988	1998	5
Vsevolod Bobrov	Soviet Union	football 1, ice hockey 1	1952	1956	2
Jorge Bonnet	Puerto Rico	bobsleigh 3, judo 2	1984	1998	5
Igor Boraska	Croatia	bobsleigh 1, rowing 3	1996	2004	4
Jan Bos	Netherlands	speed skating 4, track cycling 1	1998	2010	5
Bob Boucher	Canada	speed skating 1, track cycling 1	1968	1968	2
Charles Bouvier	Switzerland	bobsleigh 1, football 1	1924	1936	2
Charly Bouvy	Belgium	bobsleigh 1, field hockey 2	1964	1972	3
Väinö Bremer	Finland	military patrol 1, modern pentathlon 1	1924	1924	2
Jean-Marie Buisset	Belgium	bobsleigh 1, field hockey 3	1964	1972	4
Alexandra Burghardt	Germany	athletics 2, bobsleigh 1	2020	2024	3
Erik Burman	Sweden	ice hockey 2	1920	1924	2
Colin Campbell	United Kingdom	athletics 2, bobsleigh 1	1968	1976	3
Connie Carpenter-Phinney	United States	road cycling 1, speed skating 1	1972	1984	2
Albert Castelyns	Belgium	bobsleigh 2, water polo 1	1936	1956	3
Pierre Charpentier	France	ice hockey 2	1920	1924	2
Anton Collin	Finland	cross country skiing 1, road cycling 1	1924	1924	2
Allyn Condon	United Kingdom	athletics 1, bobsleigh 1	2000	2010	2
Giuseppe Crivelli	Kingdom of Italy	bobsleigh 1, rowing 1	1924	1928	2
Nathan Crumpton	American Samoa	athletics 1, skeleton 1	2020	2022	2
István Csák	Kingdom of Hungary	field hockey 1, ice hockey 1	1936	1936	2
Willie Davenport	United States	athletics 4, bobsleigh 1	1964	1980	5
Vincent De Haître	Canada	speed skating 2, track cycling 1	2014	2020	3
Alfred de Rauch	France	ice hockey 3	1920	1928	3
István Déván	Hungary (1912), Hungary (1924)	athletics 1, cross-country skiing 1, Nordic combined 1	1912	1924	2
Montell Douglas	United Kingdom	athletics 1, bobsleigh 1	2008	2022	2
Herb Drury	United States	ice hockey 2	1920	1924	2
Louis Dufour	Switzerland	ice hockey 2	1920	1928	2
Eddie Eagan	United States	bobsleigh 1, boxing 2	1920	1932	3
Claes Egnell	Sweden	modern pentathlon 1, shooting 1, winter pentathlon 1	1948	1952	3
Miguel Elizondo	Mexico	athletics 1, bobsleigh 1	1988	1992	2
Erik Elmsäter	Sweden	athletics 1, cross-country skiing 2, Nordic combined 2	1948	1952	3
Mátyás Farkas	Kingdom of Hungary	athletics 1, ice hockey 1	1928	1936	2
John Foster, Sr	United States Virgin Islands	bobsleigh 1, sailing 5	1972	1992	6
Xaver Frick	/Liechtenstein	athletics 1, cross-country skiing 1	1936	1948	2
Sébastien Gattuso	Monaco	athletics 2, bobsleigh 3	2002	2014	5
Phylicia George	Canada	athletics 2, bobsleigh 1	2012	2018	3
Glenroy Gilbert	Canada	athletics 4, bobsleigh 1	1988	2000	5
David Gilman	United States	canoeing 2, luge 1	1976	1984	3
Jurica Grabušić	Croatia	athletics 2, bobsleigh 1	2004	2008	3
Gillis Grafström	Sweden	figure skating 4	1920	1932	4
William Grut	Sweden	modern pentathlon 1, winter pentathlon 1	1948	1948	2
Johann Baptist Gudenus	Austria (1932), Austria (1936)	athletics 1, bobsleigh 2	1932	1936	3
Ari Guðmundsson	Iceland	ski jumping 1, swimming 1	1948	1952	2
Bjørn Oscar Gulbrandsen	Norway	ice hockey 1, sailing 1	1952	1956	2
Lloyd Guss	Canada	athletics 1, bobsleigh 1	1984	1988	2
Leila Gyenesei	Hungary	cross-country skiing 1, modern pentathlon 1	2006	2008	2
Miklós Gyulai	Hungary	athletics 1, bobsleigh 1	1994	2000	2
Bertil Haase	Sweden	modern pentathlon 1, winter pentathlon 1	1948	1956	2
András Haklits	Croatia	athletics 4, bobsleigh 1	2000	2012	5
Harry Haraldsen	Norway	speed skating 1, track cycling 1	1936	1936	2
Béla Háray	Kingdom of Hungary	field hockey 1, ice hockey 1	1936	1936	2
Ingrid Haringa	Netherlands	road cycling 1, speed skating 1, track cycling 2	1988	1996	3
Phil Harries	United Kingdom	athletics 1, bobsleigh 1	1988	2002	2
Madonna Harris	New Zealand	cross-country skiing 1, road cycling 1	1988	1988	2
Pierre Harvey	Canada	cross-country skiing 2, road cycling 2	1976	1988	4
John Herbert	United Kingdom	athletics 2, bobsleigh 1	1984	1994	3
Georgette Herbos	Belgium	figure skating 2	1920	1924	2
Sue Holloway	Canada	canoeing 2, cross-country skiing 1	1976	1984	3
Max Houben	Belgium	athletics 1, bobsleigh 4	1920	1948	5
Roman Hrabaň	Czechoslovakia	athletics 1, bobsleigh 1	1988	1992	2
Edy Hubacher	Switzerland	athletics 1, bobsleigh 1	1968	1972	2
Clara Hughes	Canada	road cycling 3, speed skating 3	1996	2012	6
Mateus Facho Inocêncio	Brazil	athletics 1, bobsleigh 1	2002	2004	2
Ludowika Jakobsson	Finland	figure skating 3	1920	1928	3
Marius Jaccard	Switzerland	ice hockey 2	1920	1924	2
Walter Jakobsson	Finland	figure skating 3	1920	1928	3
Tommy Johansson	Sweden	athletics 1, bobsleigh 1	1984	1984	2
Lolo Jones	United States	athletics 2, bobsleigh 1	2008	2014	3
Arvīds Jurgens	Latvia	football 1, ice hockey 1	1924	1936	2
Ruedi Keller	Switzerland	field hockey 1, ice hockey 1	1952	1956	2
Hermann Knoll	Austria	field hockey 1, ice hockey 2	1952	1964	3
Jorma Kortelainen	Finland	cross-country skiing 1, rowing 1	1956	1960	2
Slaven Krajačić	Croatia	athletics 1, bobsleigh 2	2000	2010	3
Willy Kreitz	Belgium	art competitions 1, ice hockey 2	1928	1936	3
Éva Kürti	Hungary	athletics 1, bobsleigh 1	2002	2004	2
Zsolt Kürtösi	Hungary	athletics 2, bobsleigh 1	1996	2006	3
Keijo Kuusela	Finland	field hockey 1, ice hockey 1	1952	1952	2
Karl Leban	Austria	modern pentathlon 1, speed skating 1	1936	1936	2
Percy Legard	United Kingdom	modern pentathlon 2, Nordic combined 1, winter pentathlon 1	1932	1948	4
Bruno Leuzinger	Switzerland	ice hockey 2	1920	1924	2
Hans Lindner	Austria	athletics 3, bobsleigh 1	1984	1992	4
Art Longsjo	United States	speed skating 1, track cycling 1	1956	1956	2
Valentin Loos	Czechoslovakia	ice hockey 2	1920	1924	2
Marcel Lopuchovský	Slovakia	athletics 1, bobsleigh 1	2000	2010	2
Christa Luding-Rothenburger	East Germany (until 1988), Germany	road cycling 1, speed skating 4	1980	1992	5
Max Ludwig	Weimar Republic (1932), Nazi Germany (1936)	art competitions 1, bobsleigh 1	1932	1936	2
Jeanette Lunde	Norway	alpine skiing 1, sailing 1	1994	2000	2
Arthur Mannsbarth	Austria	road cycling 1, speed skating 2, track cycling 1	1952	1956	3
Tamás Margl	Hungary	athletics 1, bobsleigh 1	2004	2006	2
Hanna Mariën	Belgium	athletics 1, bobsleigh 1	2008	2014	2
Alain Masson	Canada	cross-country skiing 2, road cycling 1	1984	1992	3
Pat McDonagh	Ireland	bobsleigh 1, rowing 2	1980	1992	3
Terry McHugh	Ireland	athletics 4, bobsleigh 2	1988	2000	6
Aleksandar Milenković	IOP (1992), Yugoslavia (1992), Serbia and Montenegro (2006)	biathlon 1, cross-country skiing 2, road cycling 1	1992	2006	3
Nils Molander	Sweden	ice hockey 2	1920	1924	2
Fritz Moser	Austria (1928), Austria (1936)	rowing 1, speed skating 1	1928	1936	2
Jaqueline Mourão	Brazil	biathlon 1, cross-country skiing 5, cycling mountain bike 3	2004	2022	8
Ethel Muckelt	United Kingdom	figure skating 3	1920	1928	3
Pierre Musy	Switzerland	bobsleigh 1, equestrian 1	1936	1948	2
Paul Narracott	Australia	athletics 1, bobsleigh 1	1984	1992	2
Kateřina Nash	Czech Republic	cross-country skiing 2, cycling mountain bike 3	1996	2016	5
Kateřina Neumannová	Czechoslovakia (1992), Czech Republic	cross-country skiing 5, cycling mountain bike 1	1992	2006	6
Chris Nicholson	New Zealand	road cycling 1, short track speed skating 2	1992	1994	3
Nathaniel Niles	United States	figure skating 3	1920	1928	3
Chirine Njeim	Lebanon	alpine skiing 3, athletics 1	2002	2016	4
Oskar Nowak	Austria (1936), Austria (1948)	field hockey 1, ice hockey 2	1936	1948	3
Luis Omedes	Spain	luge 1, rowing 1	1952	1968	2
Tibor Heinrich von Omorovicza	Kingdom of Hungary	ice hockey 1, sailing 2	1928	1936	3
Sayuri Osuga	Japan	speed skating 2, track cycling 1	2002	2006	3
Jan Palouš	Czechoslovakia	ice hockey 2	1920	1924	2
Connie Paraskevin-Young	United States	speed skating 1, track cycling 3	1984	1996	4
Jan Peka	Czechoslovakia	ice hockey 3	1920	1936	3
Roger Petit-Didier	France	bobsleigh 1, field hockey 1	1928	1928	2
Jana Pittman	Australia	athletics 2, bobsleigh 1	2000	2014	3
Viktor Platan	Finland	modern pentathlon 1, winter pentathlon 1	1948	1948	2
Roberts Plūme	Latvia	cross-country skiing 1, track cycling 2	1924	1928	3
André Poplimont	Belgium	fencing 1, ice hockey 1	1924	1932	2
Hannu Posti	Finland	athletics 1, biathlon 1	1952	1964	2
Léonhard Quaglia	France	ice hockey 3, speed skating 2	1920	1928	3
Evgeniya Radanova	Bulgaria	short track speed skating 5, track cycling 1	1994	2010	6
Hansjörg Reichel	Austria	ice hockey 1, water polo 1	1948	1952	2
Ole Reistad	Norway	athletics 1, military patrol 1	1920	1928	2
Mauri Röppänen	Finland	biathlon 1, shooting 2	1972	1984	3
Charles Sabouret	France	figure skating 2	1920	1924	2
Simone Sabouret	France	figure skating 2	1920	1924	2
René Savoie	Switzerland	ice hockey 2	1920	1924	2
Karl Schäfer	Austria (1928, 1932), Austria (1936)	ice hockey 3, swimming 1	1928	1936	4
Manfred Schumann	West Germany	athletics 1, bobsleigh 1	1972	1976	2
Martin Schützenauer	Austria	athletics 1, bobsleigh 4	1992	2002	5
Seiko Hashimoto	Japan	speed skating 4, track cycling 3	1984	1996	7
Natsue Seki	Japan	road cycling 1, speed skating 1	1988	1988	2
Shinji Aoto	Japan	athletics 2, bobsleigh 1	1988	1998	3
Claudinei da Silva	Brazil	athletics 2, bobsleigh 1	1996	2006	3
Walter von Siebenthal	Switzerland	ice hockey 2	1920	1924	2
Georgia Simmerling	Canada	alpine skiing 1, freestyle skiing 1, track cycling 2	2010	2020	4
Oluseyi Smith	Canada	athletics 1, bobsleigh 1	2012	2018	2
Josef Šroubek	Czechoslovakia	ice hockey 3	1920	1928	3
Johan Støa	Norway	athletics 1, cross-country skiing 1	1928	1928	2
Fritz Stöckli	Switzerland	bobsleigh 1, wrestling 1	1948	1952	2
Charles Stoffel	Switzerland	bobsleigh 2, equestrian 2	1924	1928	4
Martin Stokken	Norway	athletics 2, cross-country skiing 2	1948	1956	4
Olof Stolpe	Finland	bandy 1, football 1	1952	1952	2
Jeroen Straathof	Netherlands	speed skating 1, track cycling 1	1994	2004	2
Rolf Strittmatter	Switzerland	athletics 1, bobsleigh 1	1980	1984	2
Olga Stulneva	Russia	athletics 1, bobsleigh 2	2004	2014	3
Frank Synott	United States	ice hockey 2	1920	1924	2
Ferenc Szamosi	Kingdom of Hungary	field hockey 1, ice hockey 1	1936	1936	2
Béla Szepes	Kingdom of Hungary	athletics 1, cross-country skiing 1, Nordic combined 1	1924	1928	2
Pita Taufatofua	Tonga	cross-country skiing 1, taekwondo 2	2016	2020	3
Martin Tešovič	Slovakia	bobsleigh 1, weightlifting 3	1996	2012	4
Jacob Tullin Thams	Norway	sailing 1, ski jumping 2	1924	1936	3
Léon Tom	Belgium	bobsleigh 1, fencing 4	1912	1928	5
Arnold Uhrlass	/United States	speed skating 1, track cycling 1	1960	1964	2
Carlos Van den Driessche	Belgium	ice hockey 2, rowing 2	1924	1936	4
Louis Van Hege	Belgium	bobsleigh 1, football 2	1920	1932	3
Laurine van Riessen	Netherlands	speed skating 2, track cycling 2	2010	2020	4
Martial van Schelle	Belgium	bobsleigh 1, swimming 3	1920	1936	4
Philippe Van Volckxsom	Belgium	ice hockey 2, rowing 1, speed skating 1	1920	1928	3
Gaston Van Volxem	Belgium	ice hockey 2	1920	1924	2
Marián Vanderka	Slovakia	athletics 1, bobsleigh 1	2000	2002	2
Sophie Villeneuve	France	cross-country skiing 3, cycling mountain bike 1	1992	2000	4
Otakar Vindyš	Czechoslovakia	ice hockey 2	1920	1924	2
Dejan Vojnović	Croatia	athletics 1, bobsleigh 1	2000	2006	2
Torsten Voss	East Germany, Germany	athletics 1, bobsleigh 1	1988	1998	2
Eva Vrabcová-Nývltová	Czech Republic	athletics 2, cross-country skiing 3	2006	2020	5
Georges Wagemans	Belgium	figure skating 2	1920	1924	2
Theresa Weld	United States	figure skating 3	1920	1928	3
Hayley Wickenheiser	Canada	ice hockey 5, softball 1	1998	2014	6
Lauryn Williams	United States	athletics 3, bobsleigh 1	2004	2014	4
Chris Witty	United States	speed skating 4, track cycling 1	1994	2006	5
Robert de Wit	Netherlands	athletics 2, bobsleigh 1	1988	1994	3
Vilho Ylönen	Finland	military patrol 1, shooting 4	1948	1964	5
Willi Zacharias	Romania	alpine skiing 1, cross-country skiing 1, handball 1	1936	1936	2

=== Summer Olympians ===
For all the athletes see: List of athletes who competed in more than one sport at Summer Olympic games

Below there's a list of five-time Olympians who participated in two or more Summer sports.

Men that won medals in different sports
Women that won medals in different sports

Athlete	Country	Sports	First	Last	Tot.
Judith Arndt	Germany	road cycling 5, track cycling 2	1996	2012	5
David Bárcena Ríos	Mexico	equestrian 3, modern pentathlon 2	1964	1980	5
Cecilia Biagioli	Argentina	marathon swimming 1, swimming 4	2000	2020	5
João Gonçalves Filho	Brazil	swimming 2, water polo 3	1952	1968	5
Spyros Gianniotis	Greece	marathon swimming 3, swimming 3	2000	2016	5
Greg Henderson	New Zealand	road cycling 1, track cycling 4	1996	2012	5
Kristel Köbrich	Chile	marathon swimming 1, swimming 5	2004	2020	5
Bengt Ljungquist	Sweden	equestrian 1, fencing 4	1936	1964	5
Jeannie Longo	France	road cycling 7, track cycling 1	1984	2008	7
Peter Macken	Australia	fencing 1, modern pentathlon 5	1960	1976	5
Paul Martin	Switzerland	art competitions 1, athletics 5	1920	1936	5
Oussama Mellouli	Tunisia	marathon swimming 3, swimming 5	2000	2020	6
Reinder Nummerdor	Netherlands	beach volleyball 3, volleyball 2	2000	2016	5
Stuart O'Grady	Australia	road cycling 4, track cycling 4	1992	2012	6
Paul Radmilovic	United Kingdom	swimming 2, water polo 5	1908	1928	5
Richard Schuil	Netherlands	beach volleyball 2, volleyball 3	1996	2012	5
Edgar Seligman	United Kingdom	art competitions 2, fencing 4	1908	1932	6
Marianne Vos	Netherlands	road cycling 5, track cycling 1	2008	2024	5
Kerri Walsh Jennings	United States	beach volleyball 4, volleyball 1	2000	2016	5
Bradley Wiggins	United Kingdom	road cycling 1, track cycling 4	2000	2016	5
Wong Kam-po	Hong Kong	road cycling 2, track cycling 4	1996	2012	5

=== Winter Olympians ===
For all the athletes see: List of athletes who competed in more than one sport at Winter Olympic games

Below there's a list of five-time Olympians who participated in two or more Winter sports.

Men that won medals in different sports
Women that won medals in different sports

Athlete	Country	Sports	First	Last	Tot.
Ole Einar Bjørndalen	Norway	biathlon 6, cross-country skiing 1	1994	2014	6
Mike Dixon	United Kingdom	biathlon 5, cross-country skiing 1	1984	2002	6
Susi Erdmann	Germany	bobsleigh 3, luge 2	1992	2006	5
Aleksander Grajf	Yugoslavia (until 1988), Slovenia	biathlon 3, cross-country skiing 2	1984	2002	5
Arturo Kinch	Costa Rica	alpine skiing 3, cross-country skiing 4	1980	2006	5
Valérie Maltais	Canada	short track speed skating 2, speed skating 4	2010	2026	4
Oļegs Maļuhins	Unified Team (1992), Latvia	biathlon 4, cross-country skiing 1	1992	2006	5
Hannu Manninen	Finland	cross-country skiing 1, Nordic combined 6	1994	2018	6
Casey Puckett	United States	alpine skiing 4, freestyle skiing 1	1992	2010	5
Sergei Tchepikov	Soviet Union (1988), Unified Team (1992), Russia	biathlon 5, cross-country skiing 1	1988	2006	6
Indrek Tobreluts	Estonia	biathlon 5, cross-country skiing 1	1998	2014	5
Athanassios Tsakiris	Greece	biathlon 4, cross-country skiing 2	1988	2010	5
Gerda Weissensteiner	Italy	bobsleigh 2, luge 4	1988	2006	6
Alexandr Zubkov	Russia	bobsleigh 4, luge 1	1998	2014	5

== See also ==
- List of multiple Olympic medalists
- List of multiple Olympic gold medalists
- List of multiple Olympic medalists at a single Games
- List of multiple Olympic gold medalists at a single Games
- List of multiple Olympic medalists in one event
- List of multiple Olympic gold medalists in one event
- List of athletes who competed in more than one sport at Summer Olympic games
- List of athletes who competed in more than one sport at Winter Olympic games
- List of athletes who competed in both the Summer and Winter Olympic games
