= Figure skating at the 1924 Winter Olympics – Pairs =

Figure skating at the Olympics

Pairs at the I Olympic Winter Games
- Date: 31 January 1924
- Competitors: 18 from 7 nations

Medalists
1st place, gold medalist(s)		Helene Engelmann / Alfred Berger; Austria
2nd place, silver medalist(s)		Ludowika Jakobsson / Walter Jakobsson; Finland
3rd place, bronze medalist(s)		Andrée Joly / Pierre Brunet; France

The pair skating event was held as part of the figure skating at the 1924 Winter Olympics. It was the third appearance of the event, which had previously been held at the Summer Olympics in 1908 and 1920. The competition was held on Thursday, 31 January 1924. Eighteen figure skaters, from seven nations, competed.

== Results ==
Rank	Name	Nation	Total points	Places
1	Helene Engelmann / Alfred Berger	Austria	10.64	9
2	Ludowika Jakobsson / Walter Jakobsson	Finland	10.25	18.5
3	Andrée Joly / Pierre Brunet	France	9.89	22
4	Ethel Muckelt / John Page	Great Britain	9.93	30.5
5	Georgette Herbos / Georges Wagemans	Belgium	8.82	37
6	Theresa Blanchard / Nathaniel Niles	United States	9.07	39
7	Cecil Smith / Melville Rogers	Canada	9.11	41
8	Mildred Richardson / Tyke Richardson	Great Britain	7.68	57
9	Simone Sabouret / Charles Sabouret	France	7.15	61

Referee:

- (United States) Charles M. Rotch

Judges:

- (Austria) Ernst Herz
- (United Kingdom) Herbert Yglesias
- (Switzerland) J.G. Künzli
- (France) Francis Pigueron
- (Austria) Josef Fellner
- (France) Louis Magnus
- (Belgium) Edourd Delpy
