= List of athletes who competed in both the Summer and Winter Olympics =

Below is a list of athletes who competed in both the Summer and Winter Olympics, as of the end of the 2026 Winter Olympics.

Prior to the 1924 Winter Olympics, the winter sports of Figure skating and Ice hockey had been contested in the Summer Olympics. The creation of the first winter games allowed for many athletes of the era to compete in both sets of games in the same discipline, and on this page these athletes are listed below the main list. The Russian athlete Nikolai Panin is unique in having competed in both a summer sport (shooting in 1912) and a winter sport (figure skating in 1908) but only competing at the Summer Olympics.

Among these athletes, the most-occurring combination is bobsledding and athletics (also known as track and field), followed by cycling and speed skating. Other events competed in by Summer and Winter Olympians include fencing, sailing, ski jumping, and equestrian events. Only seven of the 139 athletes won medals in both the Summer or Winter Olympics.

Eddie Eagan and Gillis Grafström were the only two athletes to win gold medals in both the Summer and Winter Olympics. Grafström has the further distinction of being the only person to have won an individual gold medal in both the Summer (1920) and Winter Olympics (1924, 1928), meanwhile Eagan remains the only athlete to have managed the feat in different disciplines. Some of the Olympians competed in both sets of games over a span of different decades.

== Athletes who competed in both the Summer and Winter Olympics in different sports ==
Denotes athlete who has won medals in both the Summer and Winter Olympics

Denotes athlete who has won gold medals in both the Summer and Winter Olympics

Athlete	Nation	Summer Games	Summer Sport	Winter Games	Winter Sport	Number of Summer Games	Number of Winter Games	Total Number of Games
István Déván	Hungary	1912	Athletics	1924	Cross-country skiing/Nordic combined	1	1	2
Väinö Bremer	Finland	1924	Modern pentathlon	1924	Military patrol at the Winter Olympics	1	1	2
Anton Collin	Finland	1924	Cycling	1924	Cross-country skiing	1	1	2
Roberts Plūme	Latvia	1924/1928	Cycling	1924	Cross-country skiing	2	1	3
Charles Stoffel	Switzerland	1924/1928	Equestrian	1924/1928	Bobsleigh	2	2	4
Giuseppe Crivelli	Italy	1924	Rowing	1928	Bobsleigh	1	1	2
Max Houben	Belgium	1920	Athletics	1928/1932/1936/1948	Bobsleigh	1	4	5
Léon Tom	Belgium	1912/1920/1924/1928	Fencing	1928	Bobsleigh	4	1	5
Tibor Heinrich von Omorovicza	Hungary	1928/1936	Sailing	1928	Ice hockey	2	1	3
Roger Petit-Didier	France	1928	Field hockey	1928	Bobsleigh	1	1	2
Karl Schäfer	Austria	1928	Swimming	1928/1932/1936	Figure skating	1	3	4
Johan Støa	Norway	1928	Athletics	1928	Cross-country skiing	1	1	2
Béla Szepes	Hungary	1928	Athletics	1924	Cross-country skiing/Nordic combined	1	1	2
Carlos Van den Driessche	Belgium	1928	Fencing	1924/1936	Ice hockey	1	2	3
Philippe Van Volckxsom	Belgium	1928	Rowing	1920/1924	Ice hockey/Speed skating	1	2	3
Eddie Eagan	United States	1920/1924	Boxing	1932	Bobsleigh	2	1	3
Louis Van Hege	Belgium	1920/1924	Football	1932	Bobsleigh	2	1	3
André Poplimont	Belgium	1932	Fencing	1924	Ice hockey	1	1	2
Mátyás Farkas	Hungary	1928	Athletics	1936	Ice hockey	1	1	2
Arvīds Jurgens	Latvia	1924	Football	1936	Ice hockey	1	1	2
Percy Legard	Great Britain	1932/1936	Athletics	1936/1948	Nordic Combined	2	2	4
Martial Van Schelle	Belgium	1920/1924/1928	Swimming	1936	Bobsleigh	3	1	4
Sven Bergqvist	Sweden	1936	Football	1936	Ice hockey	1	1	2
István Csák	Hungary	1936	Field Hockey	1936	Ice hockey	1	1	2
Johann Baptist Gudenus	Austria	1936	Athletics	1932/1936	Bobsleigh	1	2	3
Harry Haraldsen	Norway	1936	Cycling	1936	Speed skating	1	1	2
Béla Háray	Hungary	1936	Field Hockey	1936	Ice hockey	1	1	2
Karl Leban	Austria	1936	Modern pentathlon	1936	Speed skating	1	1	2
Fritz Moser	Austria	1936	Rowing	1928	Speed skating	1	1	2
Jacob Tullin Thams	Norway	1936	Sailing	1924/1928	Ski jumping	1	2	3
Ferenc Szamosi	Hungary	1936	Field Hockey	1936	Ice hockey	1	1	2
Willi Zacharias	Romania	1936	Handball	1936	Alpine Skiing/Cross-country skiing	1	1	2
Xaver Frick	Liechtenstein	1936	Athletics	1948	Cross-country skiing	1	1	2
Erik Elmsäter	Sweden	1948	Athletics	1948/1952	Cross-country skiing/Nordic combined/	1	2	3
Pierre Musy	Switzerland	1948	Equestrian	1936	Bobsleigh	1	1	2
Oskar Nowak	Austria	1948	Field hockey	1936/1948	Ice hockey	1	2	3
Albert Casteleyns	Belgium	1936	Water Polo	1952/1956	Bobsleigh	1	2	3
Martin Stokken	Norway	1948/1952	Athletics	1952/1956	Cross-country skiing	2	2	4
Fritz Stöckli	Switzerland	1948	Wrestling	1952	Bobsleigh	1	1	2
Jorun Askersrud Tangen	Norway	1952	Athletics	1952	Cross-country skiing	1	1	2
Keijo Kuusela	Finland	1952	Field hockey	1952	Ice hockey	1	1	2
Arthur Mannsbarth	Austria	1952	Cycling	1952/1956	Speed skating	1	2	3
Vsevolod Bobrov	Soviet Union	1952	Football	1956	Ice hockey	1	1	2
Ruedi Keller	Switzerland	1952	Field hockey	1956	Ice hockey	1	1	2
Hermann Knoll	Austria	1952	Field Hockey	1956/1964	Ice hockey	1	2	3
Bjørn Oscar Gulbrandsen	Norway	1956	Sailing	1952	Ice hockey	1	1	2
Art Longsjo	United States	1956	Cycling	1956	Speed skating	1	1	2
Jorma Kortelainen	Finland	1960	Rowing	1956	Cross-country skiing	1	1	2
Hannu Posti	Finland	1952	Athletics	1964	Biathlon	1	1	2
Jean-Marie Buisset	Belgium	1964/1968/1972	Field hockey	1964	Bobsleigh	3	1	4
Arnold Uhrlass	United States	1964	Cycling	1960	Speed skating	1	1	2
Luis Omedes	Spain	1952	Rowing	1968	Luge	1	1	2
Bob Boucher	Canada	1968	Cycling	1968	Speed skating	1	1	2
Charly Bouvy	Belgium	1968/1972	Field hockey	1964	Bobsleigh	2	1	3
Edy Hubacher	Switzerland	1968	Athletics	1972	Bobsleigh	1	1	2
Colin Campbell	Great Britain	1968/1972	Athletics	1976	Bobsleigh	2	1	3
Manfred Schumann	West Germany	1972	Athletics	1976	Bobsleigh	1	1	2
David Gilman	United States	1976/1984	Canoeing	1976	Luge	2	1	3
Sue Holloway	Canada	1976/1984	Canoeing	1976	Cross-country skiing	2	1	3
Runald Beckman	Sweden	1976	Athletics	1980	Bobsleigh	1	1	2
Willie Davenport	United States	1964/1968/1972/1976	Athletics	1980	Bobsleigh	4	1	5
Mauri Röppänen	Finland	1980/1984	Shooting	1972	Biathlon	2	1	3
Pierre Harvey	Canada	1976/1984	Cycling	1984/1988	Cross-country skiing	2	2	4
Rolf Strittmatter	Switzerland	1980	Athletics	1984	Bobsleigh	1	1	2
Connie Carpenter-Phinney	United States	1984	Cycling	1972	Speed skating	1	1	2
Tommy Johansson	Sweden	1984	Athletics	1984	Bobsleigh	1	1	2
Johann Lindner	Austria	1984/1988/1992	Athletics	1984	Bobsleigh	3	1	4
John Foster	Virgin Islands	1972/1976/1984/1988/1992	Sailing	1988	Bobsleigh	5	1	6
Lloyd Guss	Canada	1984	Athletics	1988	Bobsleigh	1	1	2
Alain Masson	Canada	1984	Cycling	1988/1992	Cross-country skiing	1	2	3
Gilbert Bessi	Monaco	1988	Athletics	1988/1992/1994/1998	Bobsleigh	1	4	5
Madonna Harris	New Zealand	1988	Cycling	1988	Cross-country skiing	1	1	2
Seiko Hashimoto	Japan	1988/1992/1996	Cycling	1984/1988/1992/1994	Speed skating	3	4	7
Christa Luding-Rothenburger	East Germany; Germany	1988	Cycling	1984/1988/1992	Speed skating	1	3	4
Connie Paraskevin-Young	United States	1988/1992/1996	Cycling	1984	Speed skating	3	1	4
Natsue Seki	Japan	1988	Cycling	1988	Speed skating	1	1	2
Jorge Bonnet	Puerto Rico	1984/1988	Judo	1992/1994/1998	Bobsleigh	2	3	5
Terry McHugh	Ireland	1988/1992/1996/2000	Athletics	1992/1998	Bobsleigh	4	2	6
Miguel Elizondo	Mexico	1988	Athletics	1992	Bobsleigh	1	1	2
Roman Hrabaň	Czechoslovakia	1988	Athletics	1992	Bobsleigh	1	1	2
Paul Narracott	Australia	1984	Athletics	1992	Bobsleigh	1	1	2
Ingrid Haringa	Netherlands	1992/1996	Cycling	1988	Speed skating	2	1	3
Aleksandar Milenković	Yugoslavia; Independent Olympic Athletes; Serbia and Montenegro	1992	Cycling	1992/2006	Biathlon skiing Cross-country skiing	1	2	3
Chris Nicholson	New Zealand	1992	Cycling	1992/1994	Short track speed skating	1	2	3
Glenroy Gilbert	Canada	1988/1992/1996/2000	Athletics	1994	Bobsleigh	4	1	5
John Herbert	Great Britain	1984	Athletics	1994	Bobsleigh	1	1	2
Robert de Wit	Netherlands	1988/1992	Athletics	1994	Bobsleigh	2	1	3
Martin Schützenauer	Austria	1996	Athletics	1992/1994/1998/2002	Bobsleigh	1	4	5
Kateřina Neumannová	Czechoslovakia; Czech Republic	1996	Cycling	1992/1994/1998/2002/2006	Cross-country skiing	1	5	6
Kateřina Nash	Czech Republic	1996/2012	Cycling	1998/2002	Cross-country skiing	2	2	4
Torsten Voss	East Germany; Germany	1988	Athletics	1998	Bobsleigh	1	1	2
Shinji Aoto	Japan	1988/1992	Athletics	1998	Bobsleigh	2	1	3
Miklós Gyulai	Hungary	2000	Athletics	1994	Bobsleigh	1	1	2
Jeanette Lunde	Norway	2000	Sailing	1994	Alpine Skiing	1	1	2
Hayley Wickenheiser	Canada	2000	Softball	1998/2002/2006/2010/2014	Ice hockey	1	5	6
Sophie Villeneuve	France	2000	Cycling	1992/1994/1998	Cross-country skiing	1	3	4
Chris Witty	United States	2000	Cycling	1994/1998/2002/2006	Speed skating	1	4	5
Marcus Adam	Great Britain	1992	Athletics	2002	Bobsleigh	1	1	2
Antonella Bellutti	Italy	1996/2000	Cycling	2002	Bobsleigh	2	1	3
Claudinei da Silva	Brazil	1996/2000	Athletics	2002/2006	Bobsleigh	2	1	3
Phil Harries	Great Britain	1988	Athletics	2002	Bobsleigh	1	1	2
Clara Hughes	Canada	1996/2000/2012	Cycling	2002/2006/2010	Speed skating	3	3	6
Marián Vanderka	Slovakia	2000	Athletics	2002	Bobsleigh	1	1	2
Timothy Beck	Netherlands	2004	Athletics	2002/2010	Bobsleigh	1	2	3
Jan Bos	Netherlands	2004	Cycling	1998/2002/2006/2010	Speed skating	1	4	5
Sébastien Gattuso	Monaco	2004/2008	Athletics	2002/2010/2014	Bobsleigh	2	3	5
Matheus Facho Inocêncio	Brazil	2004	Athletics	2002	Bobsleigh	1	1	2
Éva Kürti	Hungary	2004	Athletics	2002	Bobsleigh	1	1	2
Evgenia Radanova	Bulgaria	2004	Cycling	1994/1998/2002/2006/2010	Short track speed skating	1	5	6
Sayuri Osuga	Japan	2004	Cycling	2002/2006	Speed skating	1	2	3
Jeroen Straathof	Netherlands	2004	Cycling	1994	Speed skating	1	1	2 (Note: Straathof also joined the 2000 Paralympics, where he won a gold medal, and is the only athlete to compete at summer, winter, and Paralympics.)
Jurica Grabušić	Croatia	2004/2008	Athletics	2006	Bobsleigh	2	1	3
Slaven Krajačić	Croatia	2000	Athletics	2006/2010	Bobsleigh	1	2	3
Zsolt Kürtösi	Hungary	1996/2000	Athletics	2006	Bobsleigh	2	1	3
Tamás Margl	Hungary	2004	Athletics	2006	Bobsleigh	1	1	2
Jaqueline Mourão	Brazil	2004/2008/2020	Cycling	2006/2010/2014/2018/2022	Cross-country skiing/Biathlon	3	5	8
Dejan Vojnović	Croatia	2000	Athletics	2006	Bobsleigh	1	1	2
Leila Gyenesei	Hungary	2008	Modern pentathlon	2006	Cross-country skiing	1	1	2
Allyn Condon	Great Britain	2000	Athletics	2010	Bobsleigh	1	1	2
András Haklits	Croatia	2000/2004/2008/2012	Athletics	2010	Bobsleigh	4	1	5
Marcel Lopuchovský	Slovakia	2000	Athletics	2010	Bobsleigh	1	1	2
Olga Stulneva	Russia	2004	Athletics	2010/2014	Bobsleigh	1	2	3
Martin Tešovič	Slovakia	1996/2004/2012	Weightlifting	2010	Bobsleigh	3	1	4
Bryan Barnett	Canada	2008	Athletics	2014	Bobsleigh	1	1	2
Lolo Jones	United States	2008/2012	Athletics	2014	Bobsleigh	2	1	3
Hanna Mariën	Belgium	2008	Athletics	2014	Bobsleigh	1	1	2
Jana Pittman	Australia	2000/2004	Athletics	2014	Bobsleigh	2	1	3
Lauryn Williams	United States	2004/2008/2012	Athletics	2014	Bobsleigh	3	1	4
Chirine Njeim	Lebanon	2016	Athletics	2002/2006/2010	Alpine skiing	1	3	4
Georgia Simmerling	Canada	2016/2020	Cycling	2010/2014	Alpine skiing/Freestyle skiing	2	2	4
Laurine van Riessen	Netherlands	2016/2020	Cycling	2010/2014	Speed skating	2	2	4
Eva Vrabcová-Nývltová	Czech Republic	2016/2020	Athletics	2006/2010/2014	Cross-country skiing	2	3	5
Sara Aerts	Belgium	2012	Athletics	2018/2022	Bobsleigh	1	2	3
Seun Adigun	Nigeria	2012	Athletics	2018	Bobsleigh	1	1	2
Phylicia George	Canada	2012/2016	Athletics	2018	Bobsleigh	2	1	3
Oluseyi Smith	Canada	2012	Athletics	2018	Bobsleigh	1	1	2
Pita Taufatofua	Tonga	2016/2020	Taekwondo	2018	Cross-country skiing	2	1	3
Eddy Alvarez	United States	2020	Baseball	2014	Short track speed skating	1	1	2
Vincent De Haître	Canada	2020	Cycling	2014/2018	Speed skating	1	2	3
Ayumu Hirano	Japan	2020	Skateboarding	2014/2018/2022/2026	Snowboarding	1	4	5
Montell Douglas	Great Britain	2008	Athletics	2022	Bobsleigh	1	1	2
Nathan Crumpton	American Samoa	2020	Athletics	2022	Skeleton	1	1	2
Alexandra Burghardt	Germany	2020/2024	Athletics	2022	Bobsleigh	2	1	3
Salomé Kora	Switzerland	2016/2020/2024	Athletics	2026	Bobsleigh	3	1	4
Christania Williams	Jamaica; Austria	2016	Athletics	2026	Bobsleigh	1	1	2
Klaudia Adamek	Poland	2020	Athletics	2026	Bobsleigh	1	1	2
Kelsey Mitchell	Canada	2020/2024	Cycling	2026	Bobsleigh	2	1	3

== Athletes who competed in both the Summer and Winter Olympics in the same sport ==
Denotes athlete who has won medals in both the Summer and Winter Olympics

Denotes athlete who has won gold medals in both the Summer and Winter Olympics

Athlete	Nation	Summer Games	Sport	Winter Games	Number of Summer Games	Number of Winter Games	Total Number of Games
Wilhelm Arwe	Sweden	1920	Ice hockey	1924	1	1	2
Eric Burman	Sweden	1920	Ice hockey	1924	1	1	2
Pierre Charpentier	France	1920	Ice hockey	1924	1	1	2
Alfred de Rauch	France	1920	Ice hockey	1924/1928	1	2	3
Herb Drury	United States	1920	Ice hockey	1924	1	1	2
Louis Dufour	Switzerland	1920	Ice hockey	1924/1928	1	2	3
Gillis Grafström	Sweden	1920	Figure skating	1924/1928/1932	1	3	4
Georgette Herbos	Belgium	1920	Figure skating	1924	1	1	2
Marius Jaccard	Switzerland	1920	Ice hockey	1924	1	1	2
Ludovika Jakobsson-Eilers	Finland	1920	Figure skating	1924/1928	1	2	3
Walter Jakobsson	Finland	1920	Figure skating	1924/1928	1	2	3
Bruno Leuzinger	Switzerland	1920	Ice hockey	1924	1	1	2
Vilém Loos	Czechoslovakia	1920	Ice hockey	1924	1	1	2
Nils Molander	Sweden	1920	Ice hockey	1924	1	1	2
Ethel Muckelt	Great Britain	1920	Figure skating	1924/1928	1	2	3
Nathaniel Niles	United States	1920	Figure skating	1924/1928	1	2	3
Jan Palouš	Czechoslovakia	1920	Ice hockey	1924	1	1	2
Jan Peka	Czechoslovakia	1920	Ice hockey	1924/1928/1936	1	3	4
Léonhard Quaglia	France	1920	Ice hockey	1924/1928	1	2	3
Charles Sabouret	France	1920	Figure skating	1924	1	1	2
Simone Sabouret	France	1920	Figure skating	1924	1	1	2
René Savoie	Switzerland	1920	Ice hockey	1924	1	1	2
Josef Šroubek	Czechoslovakia	1920	Ice hockey	1924/1928	1	2	3
Frank Synnott	United States	1920	Ice hockey	1924	1	1	2
Otakar Vindyš	Czechoslovakia	1920	Ice hockey	1924	1	1	2
Philippe Van Volckxsom	Belgium	1920	Ice hockey	1924	1	1	2
Georges Wagemans	Belgium	1920	Figure skating	1924	1	1	2
Theresa Weld	United States	1920	Figure skating	1924/1928	1	2	3

== Uncertain athletes ==
The next 25 athletes have an uncertain status: they have not participated at one (or more) of 2 or more sports but their appearance in the Olympic official website is considered official. Some of them have been already included in the list above. There are also some contrasts between Olympedia and the Olympics official website regarding the number of appearances.

Sports and years in bold are those sports and years that are considered as official in the Olympics website or Olympedia but the athletes haven't participated in those years at those sports (or 1 out of more times).

Athletes already included in the list above (5)

Athlete	Nation	Summer Games	Summer Sport	Winter Games	Winter Sport	Number of Summer Games	Number of Winter Games	Total Number of Games
Andor Szende	Hungary	**1908**/**1912**	**Athletics**	**1924**	**Figure skating**	2	1	3
István Déván	Hungary	1912	Athletics	1924	Cross-country skiing / Nordic combined / **Ski jumping**	1	1	2
Henri Couttet	France	1920	Ice hockey	**1924**	**Ice hockey**	1	1	2
Louis Dufour	Switzerland	1920	Ice hockey	**1924**/1928	**Ice hockey**	1	2	3
François Franck	Belgium	**1920**	**Ice hockey**	1924/1928	Ice hockey	1	2	3
Gerry Geran	United States	1920	Ice hockey	**1924**	**Ice hockey**	1	1	2
Max Holsboer	Switzerland	1920	Ice hockey	**1924**	**Ice hockey**	1	1	2
Victor de Laveleye	Belgium	1920/1924	Tennis	**1928**	**Ice hockey**	2	1	3
Alfred Mégroz	Switzerland	1920	Figure skating	**1924**	**Figure skating**	1	1	2
Svea Norén	Sweden	1920	Figure skating	**1924**	**Figure skating**	1	1	2
Charles Bouvier	Switzerland	**1924**	**Football**	1936	Bobsleigh	1	1	2
Jean de Beaumont	France	1924	Shooting	**1936**	**Skeleton**	1	1	2
Willy Kreitz	Belgium	1936	Art competitions	**1924**/1928/1936	**Ice hockey**	1	3	4
Chris Mackintosh	Great Britain	1924	Athletics	**1924**	**Cross-country skiing** / **Nordic combined** / **Ski jumping**	1	1	2
Sten Mellgren	Sweden	1924	Football	**1924**	**Ice hockey**	1	1	2
Josef Německý	Czechoslovakia	**1924**	**Athletics**	1924/1928	Cross-country skiing	1	2	3
Hans Volckmar	Austria	**1924**	**Athletics**	1936	Bobsleigh	1	1	2
Kārlis Bukass	Latvia	**1928**	**Athletics**	1936	Cross-country skiing	1	1	2
Fernand Carez	Belgium	**1928**	**Field hockey**	1936	Ice hockey	1	1	2
Mátyás Farkas	Hungary	1928	Athletics	**1928**/1936	**Ice hockey**	1	2	3
Karl Schäfer	Austria	1928/**1936**	**Swimming**	1928/1932/1936	Figure skating	2	3	5
Sándor Miklós	Hungary	**1936**	**Field hockey**	1936	Ice hockey	1	1	2
Eberhard Weise	East Germany	**1976**	**Athletics**	1984	Bobsleigh	1	1	2
Ashleigh Nelson (sprinter)	Great Britain	**2008**/**2020**	**Athletics'**	2026	Bobsleigh	2	1	3
Tyquendo Tracey	Jamaica	**2020**	**Athletics**	2026	Bobsleigh	1	1	2
