= Figure skating at the 1920 Summer Olympics – Pairs =

Figure skating at the Olympics

Pairs figure skating at the Games of the VII Olympiad
- Venue: Palais de Glace d'Anvers
- Date: 26 April 1920
- Competitors: 16 from 6 nations

Medalists
1st place, gold medalist(s)		Ludowika Jakobsson / Walter Jakobsson; Finland
2nd place, silver medalist(s)		Alexia Bryn / Yngvar Bryn; Norway
3rd place, bronze medalist(s)		Phyllis Johnson / Basil Williams; Great Britain

The pair skating event held as part of the figure skating at the 1920 Summer Olympics. It was the second appearance of the pair skating event and the sport, which had previously been held in 1908. Eight pairs from six nations competed. Bronze medalist Phyllis Johnson had captured the silver medal at the 1908 Olympics with a different partner.

== Results ==
Rank	Name	Nation	Places
1	Ludowika Jakobsson / Walter Jakobsson	Finland	7.0
2	Alexia Bryn / Yngvar Bryn	Norway	15.5
3	Phyllis Johnson / Basil Williams	Great Britain	25.0
4	Theresa Weld / Nathaniel Niles	United States	28.5
5	Ethel Muckelt / Sydney Wallwork	Great Britain	34.0
6	Georgette Herbos / Georges Wagemans	Belgium	41.5
7	Simone Sabouret / Charles Sabouret	France	45.5
8	Madeleine Beaumont / Kenneth Beaumont	Great Britain	55.0

Referee:

- (Sweden) Victor Lundquist

Judges:

- (France) Louis Magnus
- (Norway) Knut Ørn Meinich
- (Belgium) Eudore Lamborelle
- (United Kingdom) Herbert Yglesias
- (Switzerland) Alfred Mégroz
- (Sweden) August Anderberg
- (Finland) Sakari Ilmanen

== Sources ==
- Belgium Olympic Committee (1957). Olympic Games Antwerp 1920: Official Report (in French).
- Wudarski, Pawel (1999). "Wyniki Igrzysk Olimpijskich" (in Polish). Archived from the original on 19 June 2007.
