= Sydney Wallwork =

British figure skater

Personal information
- Nationality: British
- Born: 17 August 1882 Manchester, England
- Died: 27 September 1966 (aged 84) Bucklow, England

Sport
- Sport: Figure skating

Sydney Wallwork (17 August 1882 – 27 September 1966) was a British figure skater. He competed in the pairs event at the 1920 Summer Olympics.
