= Mildred Richardson =

British figure skater

Personal information
- Full name: Mildred Richardson
- Other names: Wag Richardson
- Born: 19 July 1893 Paddington, London, England
- Died: 28 June 1987 (aged 93) Westminster, London, England

Figure skating career
- Country: United Kingdom

Mildred Richardson (19 July 1893 – 28 June 1987) was a British competitive pair skater. With her husband Tyke Richardson, she represented Great Britain at the 1924 Winter Olympics, where they were placed 8th.

== Early life ==
Richardson was born as Fanny Mildred Allingham on 19 July 1893. She was a talented singer in her youth but gave it up as she became involved in ice skating.

== Ice Skating ==
Before the First World War, Richardson won a number of ice dancing competitions with her partner and future husband T.D. Richardson. They married in 1915 and after the war resumed competing including representing Great Britain at the 1924 Winter Olympics. In 1936 she was a non-playing captain of the British figure skating team at the 1936 Winter Olympics.

The Richardsons became active judges, both reaching the rank of International Skating Union (ISU) Championship (World) Judge. They also served as referees and judged many national and international championships.

The Richardsons served the National Skating Association (now the National Ice Skating Association) of Great Britain in many capacities. Both Richardson and her husband were elected to honorary life membership of the NSA in 1967.

== Later life ==
Richardson died on the 28 June 1987, aged 87.
