= Charles Sabouret =

French figure skater

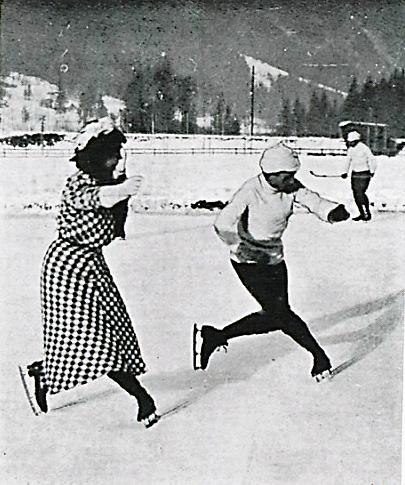
- Sabouret skating with Yvonne Lacroix (1907)

Personal information
- Full name: Charles Joseph Marie Sabouret
- Nationality: French
- Born: 8 June 1877; Périgueux, France

Sport
- Sport: Figure skating

Charles Sabouret (8 June 1884 – 18 April 1967) was a French figure skater. He participated in the Olympic Games in Antwerp 1920 (seventh place) and Chamonix 1924 (ninth place) in Pair Skating along with Simone Sabouret.
