= T. D. Richardson =

British figure skater

T.D. Richardson OBE
Personal information
- Full name: Thomas Dow Richardson
- Other names: Tyke Richardson
- Born: 16 January 1887 York
- Died: 7 January 1971 (aged 83) London

Figure skating career
- Country: United Kingdom

Thomas Dow "Tyke" Richardson OBE (16 January 1887 – 7 January 1971) was a British competitive pair skater, author and judge.

With his wife, Mildred Richardson, he represented Great Britain at the 1924 Winter Olympics, where they placed 8th.

He was elected to the World Figure Skating Hall of Fame posthumously in 1976.

== Personal life ==
Richardson was born in York and died in London.

He was educated at Cambridge where he was an outstanding oarsman and boxer, and was married to his former ice skating partner Mildred "Wag" Allingham, who survived him on his death.

He served in the British Army in World War I, attaining the rank of Captain.

== Competitive career ==
He first learned the English style of skating, but was soon attracted to the International Style, to which he contributed greatly throughout his life. He took lessons from Bernard Adams, the first great British skating teacher of the International Style, and from Bror Meyer of Sweden. He eventually earned his gold medal in the International Style and the bronze medal in the English Style.

T.D Richardson first took to the ice in 1891 at the age of four, during the winter known as 'the great frost'. He began skating pairs in 1911 with his future wife, Mildred Allingham, and together they made a substantial contribution to the development of modern pair skating, particularly in the unique form of "mirror" or shadow skating.

After active service in World War I on the Western Front, Richardson resumed competing with his wife. They were the 1923 British silver medalists and competed at the 1924 Winter Olympic Games.

== Judging and publishing career ==
The Richardsons became active judges, both reaching the rank of International Skating Union (ISU) Championship (World) Judge. They also served as referees and judged many national and international championships. Richardson was a judge at the 1927 World Figure Skating Championships and 1928 Winter Olympic Games. He was also instrumental in obtaining the adoption by the International Skating Union of a rule limiting a country to one judge in each event in which it has entries.

During the 1920s, Richardson carried out the research that culminated in his famous book, Modern Figure Skating, first published in 1930. This book represented his revolutionary concept of the "Theory of the Sixteen Positions" in compulsory figures. It was a fundamental and practical approach to the execution of compulsory figures, which remained valid for many decades.

He went on to write ten more books, of which The Art of Figure Skating, published in 1962, reflected the mature development of his theories about figure skating. He was the definitive reporter of the sport for many years as correspondent for The Times of London and Skating World magazine.

Richardson long advocated the addition of new compulsory figures to the International schedule and established the Star Class Test in England, including the new compulsory figures. His proposals never gained international acceptance, however, a factor that contributed to the eventual disappearance of compulsory figures from international competition.

In 1958 Richardson founded the Commonwealth Winter Games in St Moritz, Switzerland, and served as chairman of the Games until his death.

The Richardsons served the National Skating Association (now the National Ice Skating Association) of Great Britain in many capacities. Richardson was chairman of the Ice Figure Committee of the NSA for 11 years and was vice chairman of the NSA Council. He and his wife were elected to honorary life membership of the NSA in 1967, and Queen Elizabeth II appointed him an Officer of the Order of the British Empire (OBE) for services to British skating in the 1955 New Year Honours.

On his death in 1971, Cecilia Colledge, the great British, European and World Champion skater said of him: "He acted always for what he knew was right. He would not submerge his principles in order to be popular. He would not compromise in order to be elected. He would not curb his independent courage. He served skating."
