= Mátyás Farkas =

Hungarian athlete (1903–1981)

Personal information
- Nationality: Hungarian
- Born: 13 August 1903; Budapest, Kingdom of Hungary
- Died: 1 June 1981 (aged 77); Debrecen, Hungary

Sport
- Sport: Athletics
- Event: Decathlon

Mátyás Farkas (13 August 1903 – 1 June 1981) was a Hungarian athlete. He competed in the men's decathlon at the 1928 Summer Olympics. He also competed in the ice hockey tournament at the 1936 Winter Olympics.

== See also ==
- List of athletes who competed in both the Summer and Winter Olympic games
