= Charly Bouvy =

Belgian sportsman (1942–2003)

Personal information
- Nationality: Belgian
- Born: 2 December 1942 Uccle, Belgium
- Died: 31 March 2003 (aged 60)

Sport
- Sport: Bobsleigh; Hockey

Charly Bouvy (2 December 1942 – 31 March 2003) was a Belgian bobsledder. He competed in the four-man event at the 1964 Winter Olympics. He also competed in the hockey tournaments at the 1968 Summer Olympics and the 1972 Summer Olympics.

== See also ==
- List of athletes who competed in both the Summer and Winter Olympic games
