= Georgette Herbos =

Belgian figure skater

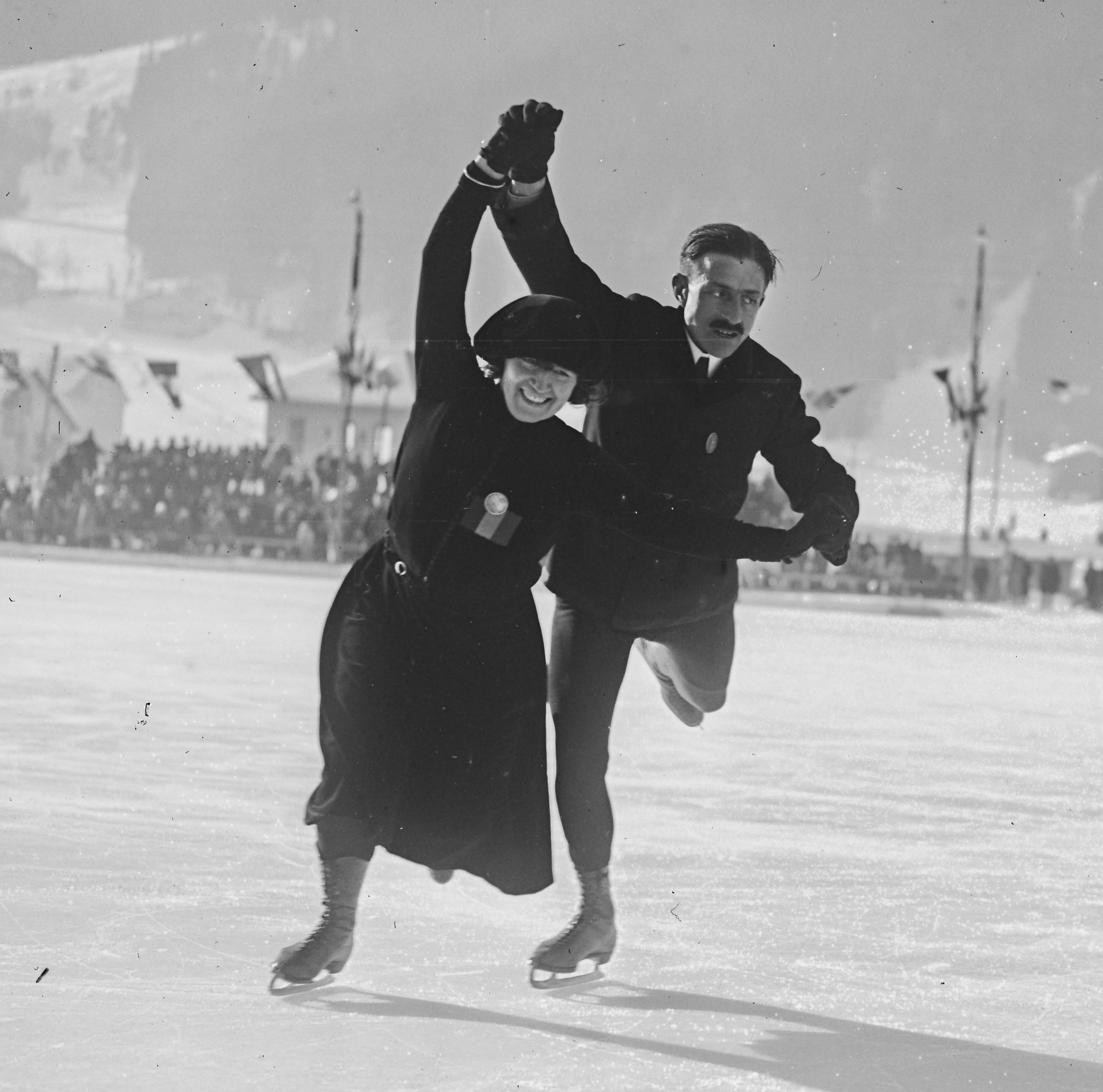
- Georgette Herbos and Georges Wagemans figure skating at the 1924 Winter Olympics.

Personal information
- Born: October 7, 1883

Figure skating career
- Country: Belgium
- Partner: Georges Wagemans

Georgette Herbos (born 7 October 1883) was a Belgian competitive figure skater and Olympic athlete. Alongside Georges Wagemans, she competed as a pair figure skater in the 1920 Summer Olympics and the 1924 Winter Olympics.

== Results ==
Olympics	Competition	Partner	Results
(Belgium) 1920 Summer Olympics - Antwerp	Pair figure skating	Georges Wagemans	6th place
(France) 1924 Winter Olympics - Chamonix	Pair figure skating	Georges Wagemans	5th place
