= Georges Wagemans =

Belgian figure skater

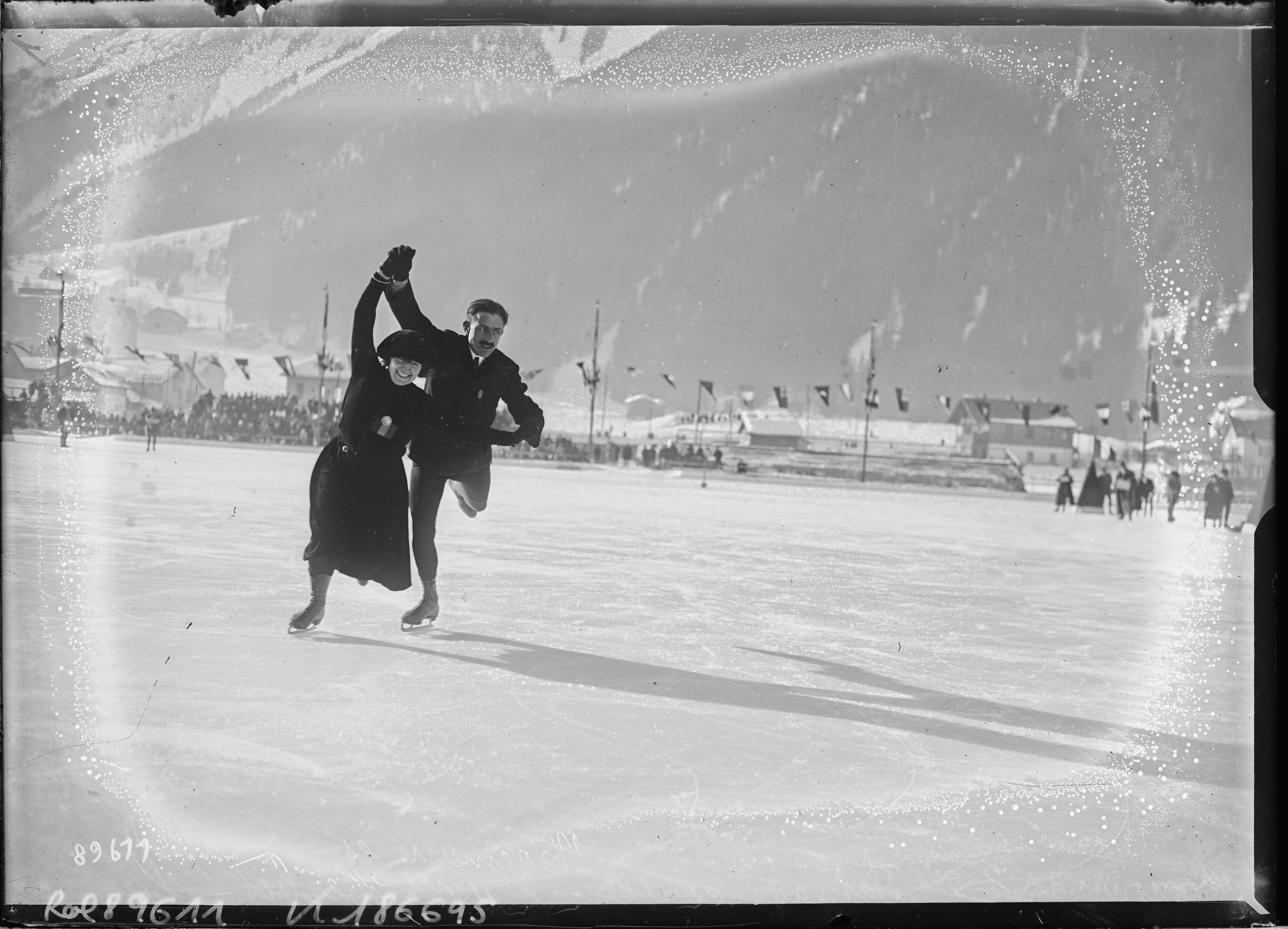
- Georgette Herbos and Georges Wagemans skating at the 1924 Winter Olympics.

Personal information
- Born: 8 November 1880

Figure skating career
- Country: Belgium

Georges Joseph Martin Guillaume Wagemans (8 November 1880 – 3 January 1966) was a Belgian figure skater. He competed in the 1920 Summer Olympics and 1924 Winter Olympics along with Georgette Herbos.
