= Simone Sabouret =

French figure skater

Personal information
- Full name: Simonne Henriette Roussel
- Nationality: French
- Born: 19 October 1893; Paris, France
- Died: 31 October 1974 (aged 81); Châtenay-Malabry, France

Sport
- Sport: Figure skating

Simone Sabouret (19 October 1893 – 31 October 1974) was a French figure skater. She competed at the 1920 Summer Olympics and the 1924 Winter Olympics.
