= Okazaki, Aichi =

Okazaki 岡崎市
- Core city
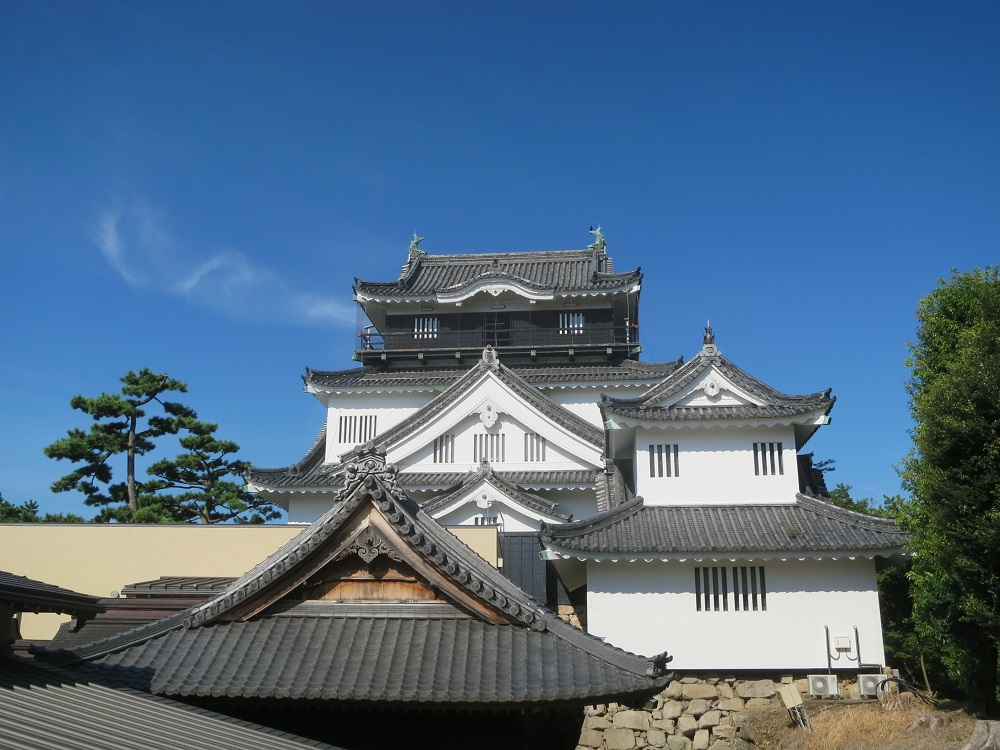
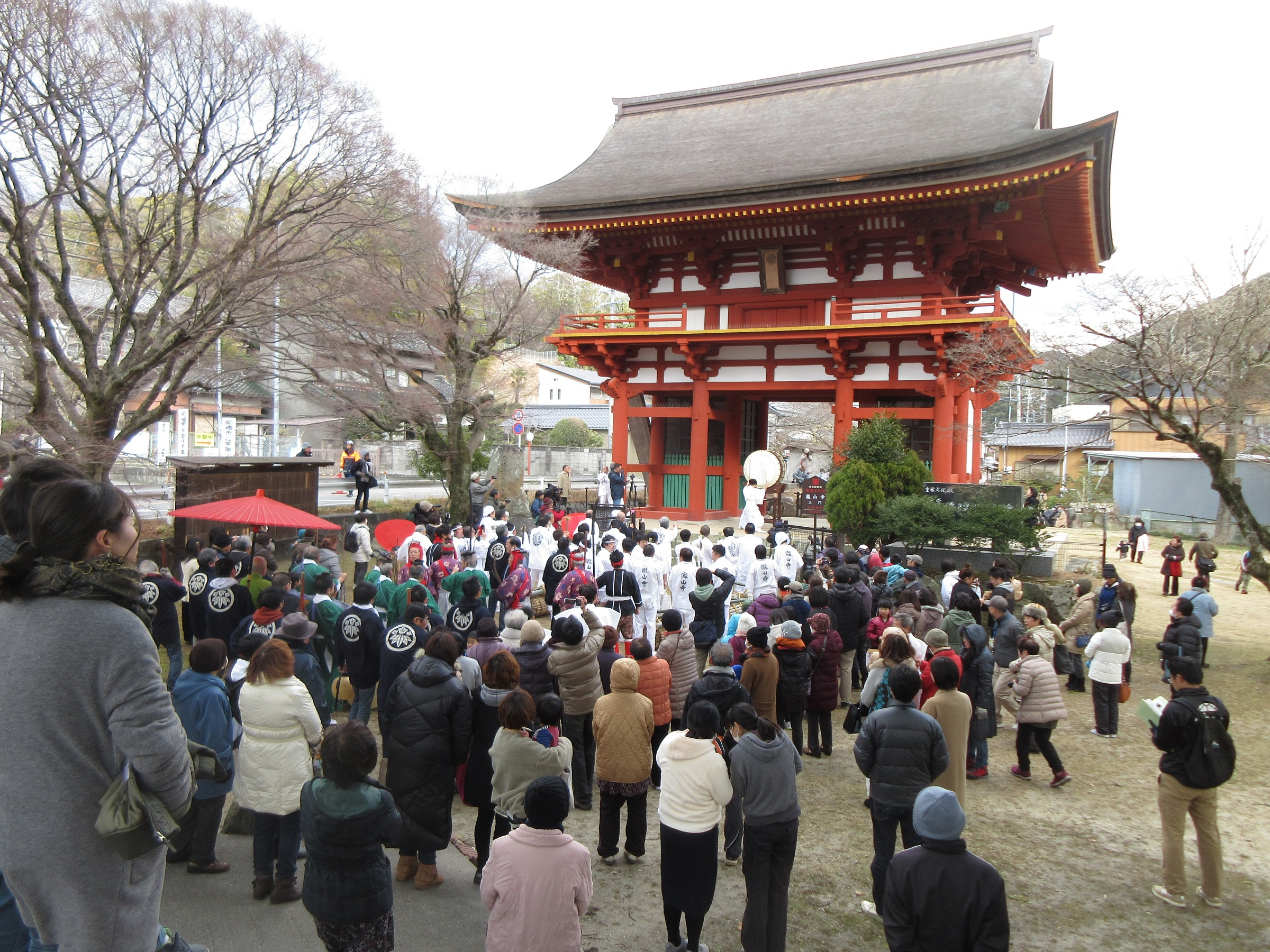
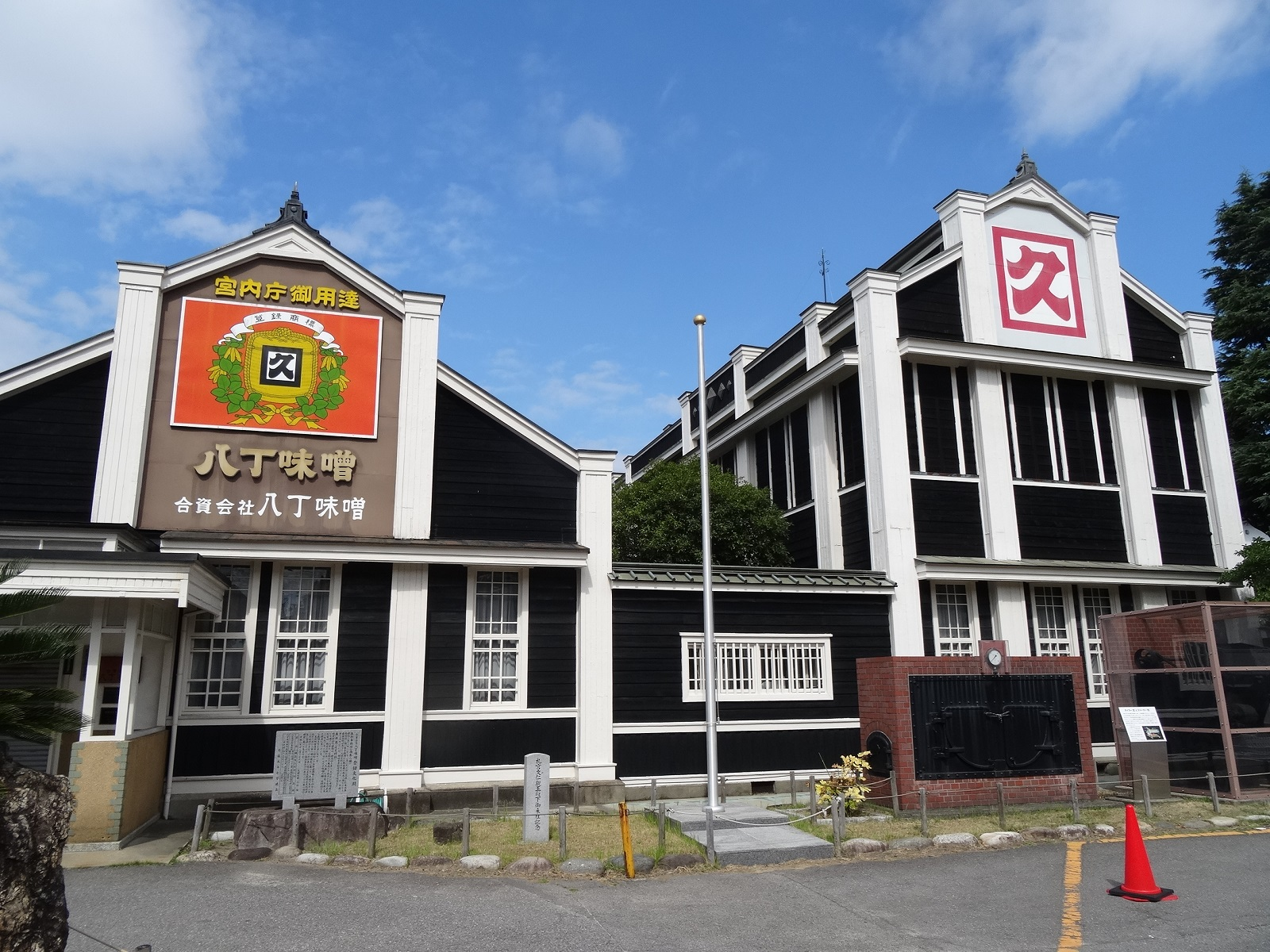
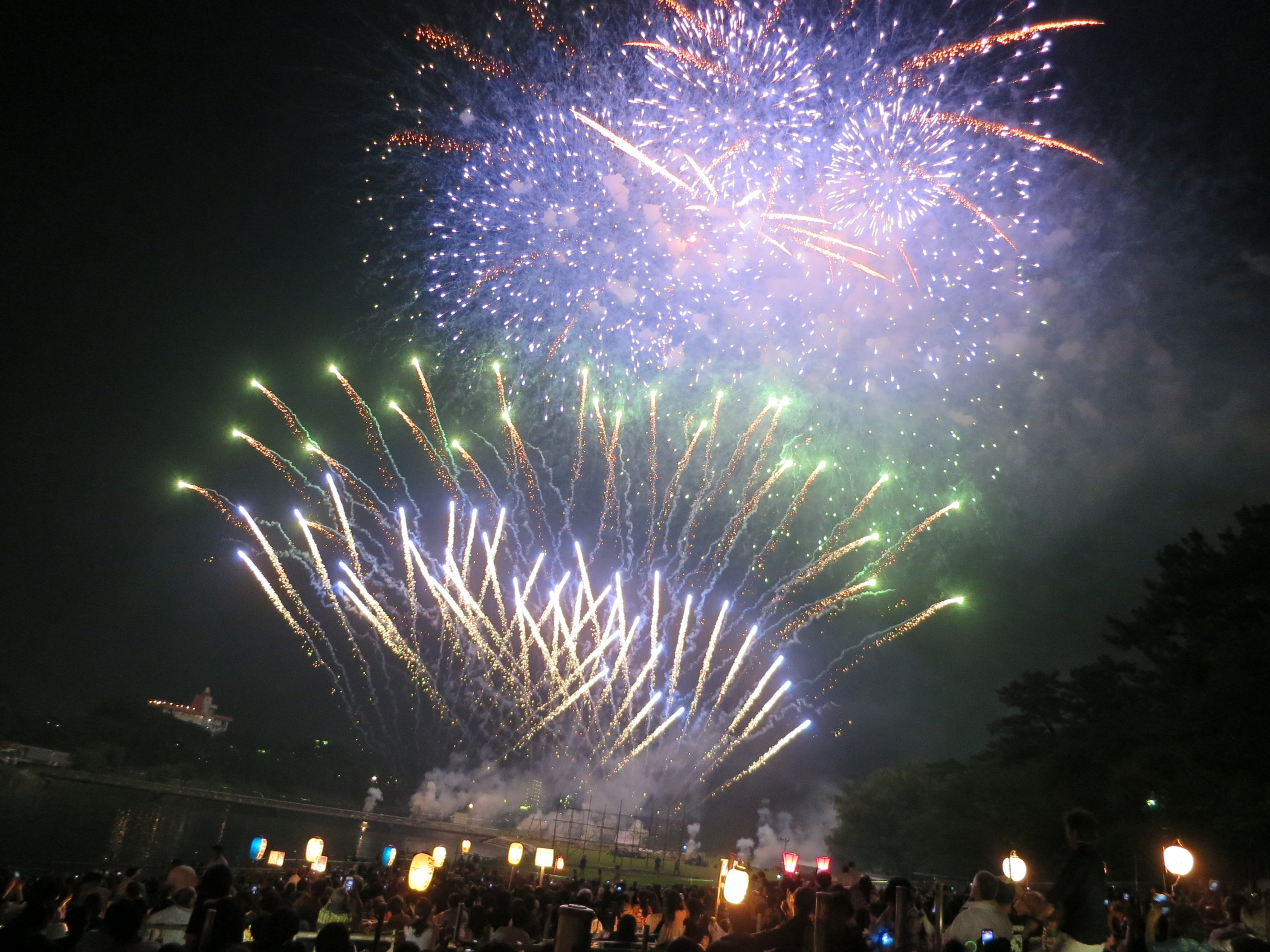
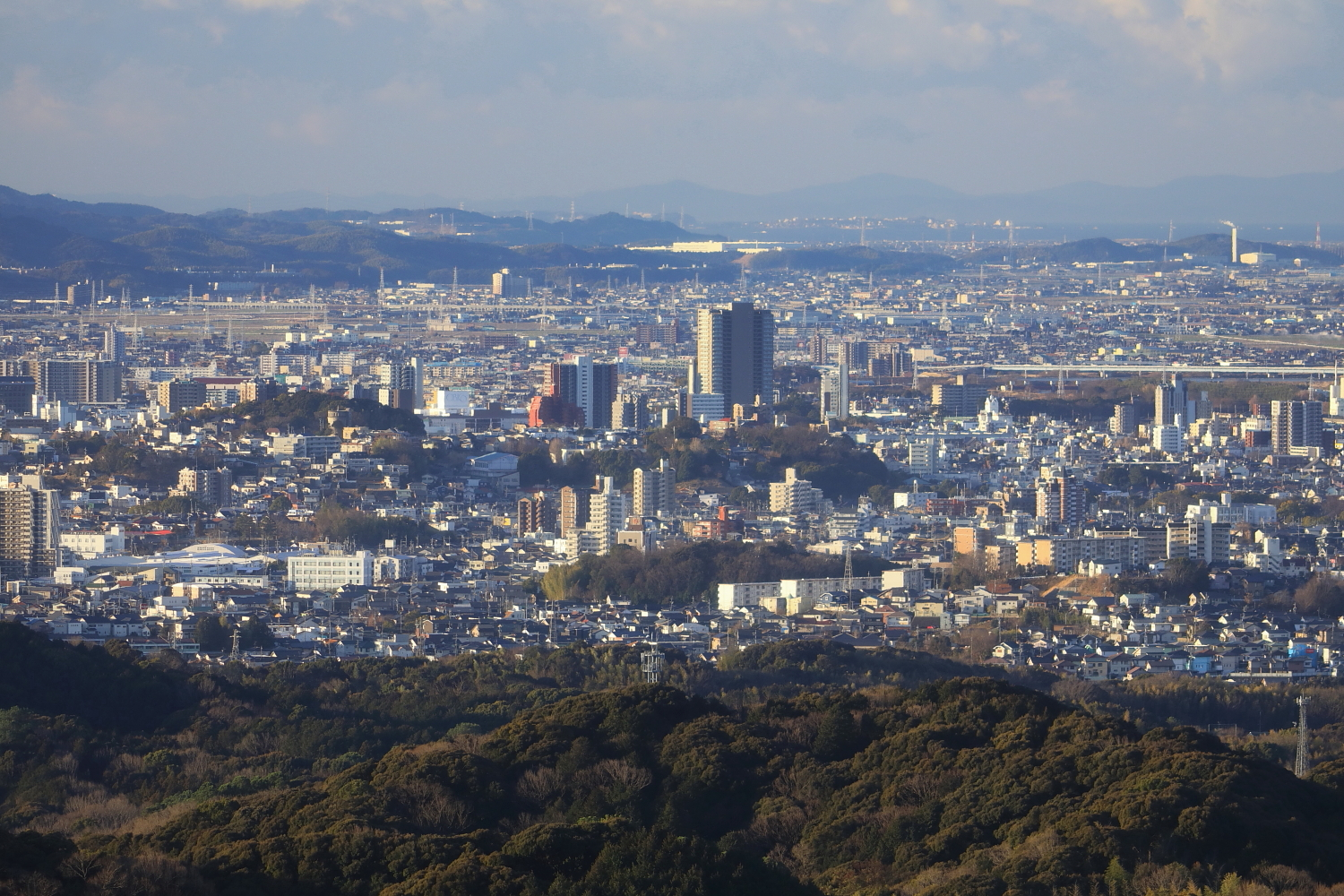
- Okazaki Castle Takisan-ji Temple Hatcho Miso Okazaki Ieyasu Fireworks Okazaki skyline

- Flag Emblem
- Interactive map outlining Okazaki
- Location of Okazaki in Aichi Prefecture

- Location within Japan
- Coordinates: 34°57′15.6″N 137°10′27.7″E
- Country: Japan
- Region: Chūbu (Tōkai)
- Prefecture: Aichi
- First official recorded: 315 AD
- City Settled: June 1, 1916

Government
  - Mayor: Yasuhiro Uchida

Area
  - Total: 387.20 km^{2} (149.50 sq mi)

Population (2025)
  - Total: 377,608
  - Rank: 63rd in Japan
  - Density: 975.23/km^{2} (2,525.8/sq mi)
  - Seat/Locality: 226,000
- Time zone: UTC+9 (Japan Standard Time)
- Phone number: 0564-23-6495
- Address: 2–9 Jūō-chō, Okazaki-shi, Aichi-ken 444-8601
- Climate: Cfa
- Website: Official website
- Symbols
- Bird: Japanese white wagtail
- Flower: Wisteria
- Tree: Japanese black pine

Okazaki (岡崎市, Okazaki-shi; Japanese pronunciation: [ò̞.kä́.(d͡)zä̀.k̟ʲì, -(d͡)zä́.k̟ʲi̥.ɕì]) is a city located in Aichi Prefecture, Japan. As of 1 October 2019, the city had an estimated population of 386,999 in 164,087 households, and a population density of 999 persons per km^{2}. The total area of the city was 387.20 km^{2} (149.50 sq mi).

== Geography ==
Okazaki is in the coastal plains of southeastern Aichi Prefecture. The ground rises to undulating hills in the former Nukata area to the northeast. About 60 percent of the city area is forested and remains sparsely populated.

Okazaki is about 250 miles (400 km) from Tokyo, to the southwest.

=== Climate ===
The city has a climate characterized by hot and humid summers, and relatively mild winters (Köppen climate classification Cfa). The average annual temperature in Okazaki is 15.5 °C (59.9 °F). The average annual rainfall is 1,507.6 mm (59.35 in) with September as the wettest month. The temperatures are highest on average in August, at around 27.4 °C (81.3 °F), and lowest in January, at around 4.1 °C (39.4 °F).

Climate data for Okazaki (1991−2020 normals, extremes 1979−present)
| Month | Jan | Feb | Mar | Apr | May | Jun | Jul | Aug | Sep | Oct | Nov | Dec | Year |
|---|---|---|---|---|---|---|---|---|---|---|---|---|---|
| Record high °C (°F) | 17.2 (63.0) | 21.6 (70.9) | 24.6 (76.3) | 29.5 (85.1) | 32.8 (91.0) | 36.1 (97.0) | 39.8 (103.6) | 39.0 (102.2) | 37.8 (100.0) | 31.9 (89.4) | 26.1 (79.0) | 23.1 (73.6) | 39.8 (103.6) |
| Mean daily maximum °C (°F) | 9.1 (48.4) | 10.2 (50.4) | 14.1 (57.4) | 19.6 (67.3) | 24.2 (75.6) | 27.1 (80.8) | 31.0 (87.8) | 32.7 (90.9) | 29.0 (84.2) | 23.3 (73.9) | 17.4 (63.3) | 11.6 (52.9) | 20.8 (69.4) |
| Daily mean °C (°F) | 4.1 (39.4) | 5.0 (41.0) | 8.6 (47.5) | 13.8 (56.8) | 18.6 (65.5) | 22.3 (72.1) | 26.2 (79.2) | 27.4 (81.3) | 23.9 (75.0) | 17.9 (64.2) | 11.8 (53.2) | 6.4 (43.5) | 15.5 (59.9) |
| Mean daily minimum °C (°F) | −0.7 (30.7) | 0.0 (32.0) | 3.1 (37.6) | 8.1 (46.6) | 13.3 (55.9) | 18.2 (64.8) | 22.5 (72.5) | 23.3 (73.9) | 19.7 (67.5) | 13.2 (55.8) | 6.5 (43.7) | 1.4 (34.5) | 10.7 (51.3) |
| Record low °C (°F) | −7.6 (18.3) | −7.6 (18.3) | −4.7 (23.5) | −1.9 (28.6) | 3.1 (37.6) | 8.9 (48.0) | 15.1 (59.2) | 14.8 (58.6) | 7.8 (46.0) | 2.3 (36.1) | −1.7 (28.9) | −6.5 (20.3) | −7.6 (18.3) |
| Average precipitation mm (inches) | 53.7 (2.11) | 60.9 (2.40) | 115.8 (4.56) | 123.6 (4.87) | 139.4 (5.49) | 177.1 (6.97) | 184.1 (7.25) | 117.9 (4.64) | 223.5 (8.80) | 177.1 (6.97) | 80.2 (3.16) | 57.2 (2.25) | 1,507.6 (59.35) |
| Average precipitation days (≥ 1.0 mm) | 5.4 | 6.3 | 9.2 | 9.4 | 9.7 | 12.0 | 11.0 | 7.7 | 10.6 | 9.9 | 6.6 | 6.1 | 103.9 |
| Mean monthly sunshine hours | 172.0 | 165.5 | 191.5 | 193.5 | 194.2 | 136.7 | 164.8 | 210.8 | 159.6 | 162.2 | 162.8 | 167.4 | 2,081 |
Source: Japan Meteorological Agency

=== Demographics ===
Per Japanese census data, the population of Okazaki has grown steadily over the past 60 years. This fast population growth reflects the low unemployment rate, as well as affordable housing close to Nagoya. Of the total population, in November 2019 there were 12,581 are foreign nationals (2.92% of the total, compared with the nationwide average of 1.55%). There are 6,148 foreign males and 6,433 foreign females with a total of 6990 households. Including those registered as stateless, the foreign population comes from 71 nationalities, though more than half are from Brazil. Other significant foreign communities include Koreans, Chinese and Filipinos.

Historical population
| Year | Pop. | ±% |
|---|---|---|
| 1960 | 186,559 | — |
| 1970 | 219,092 | +17.4% |
| 1980 | 271,243 | +23.8% |
| 1990 | 316,334 | +16.6% |
| 2000 | 345,997 | +9.4% |
| 2010 | 372,357 | +7.6% |
| 2020 | 384,654 | +3.3% |

=== Surrounding municipalities ===
Aichi Prefecture

- Toyokawa
- Shinshiro
- Toyota
- Nishio
- Kōta
- Anjō
- Gamagōri

=== Cityscape ===
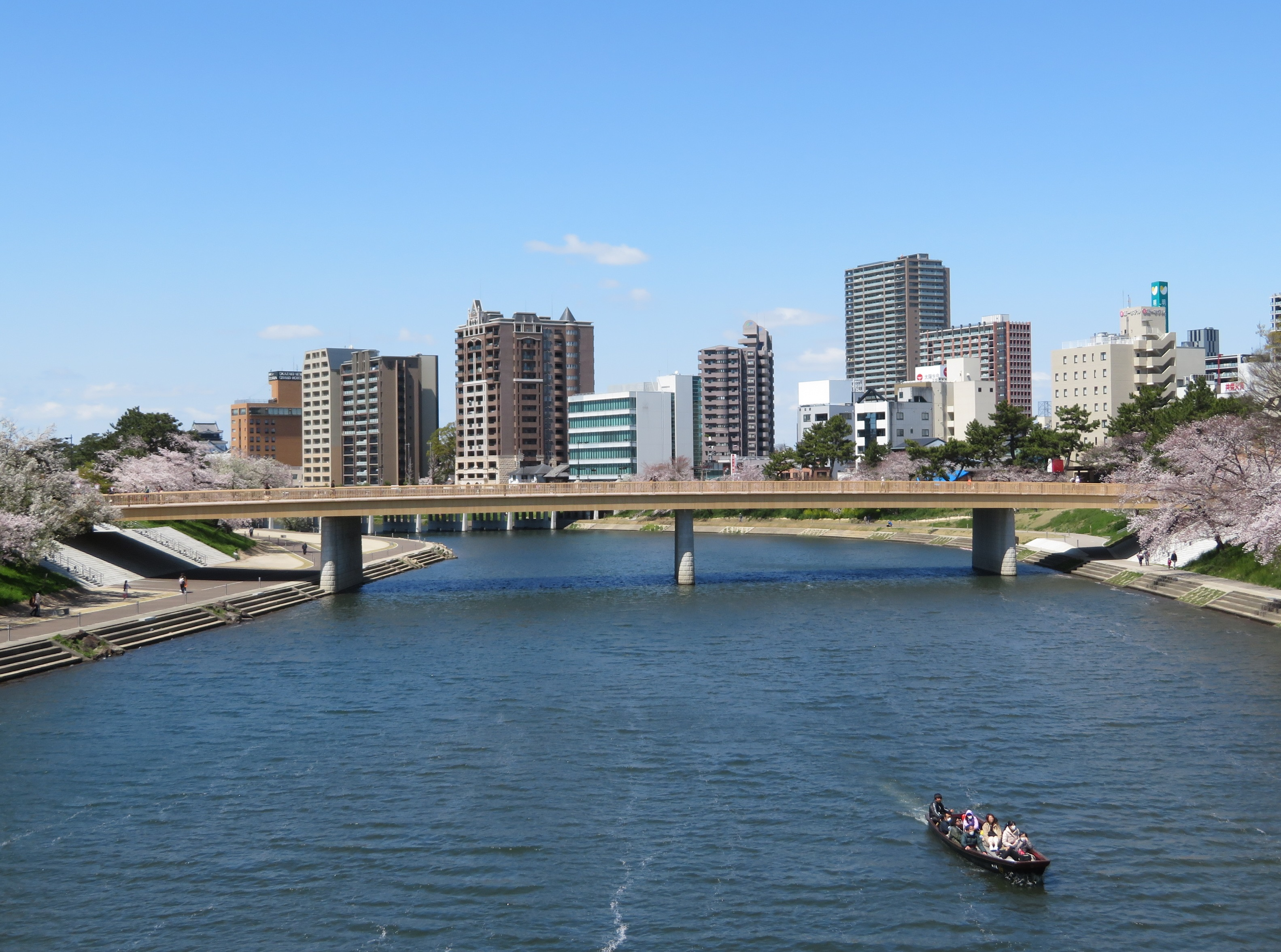
Skyline of Okazaki City and Oto River

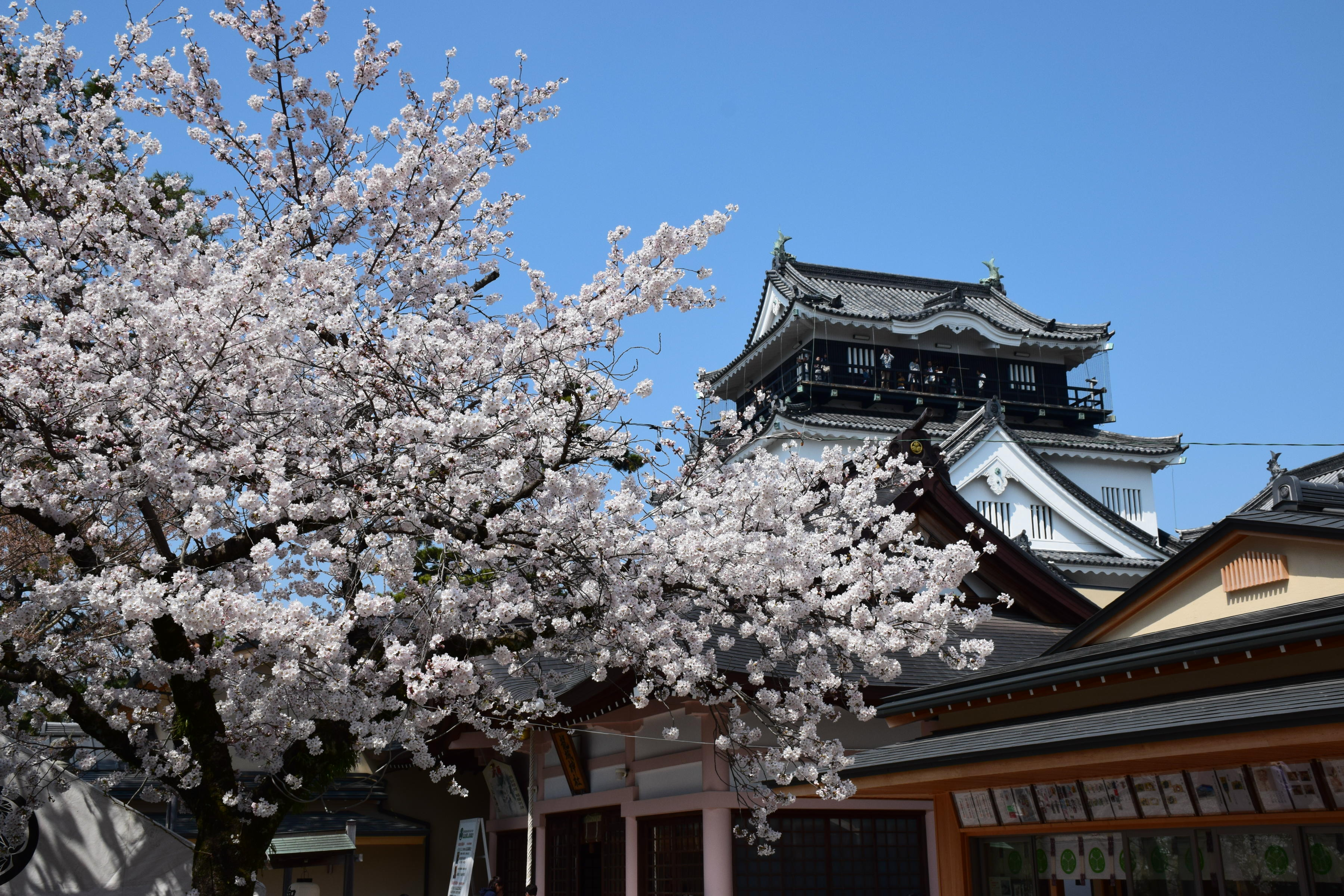
Okazaki Castle

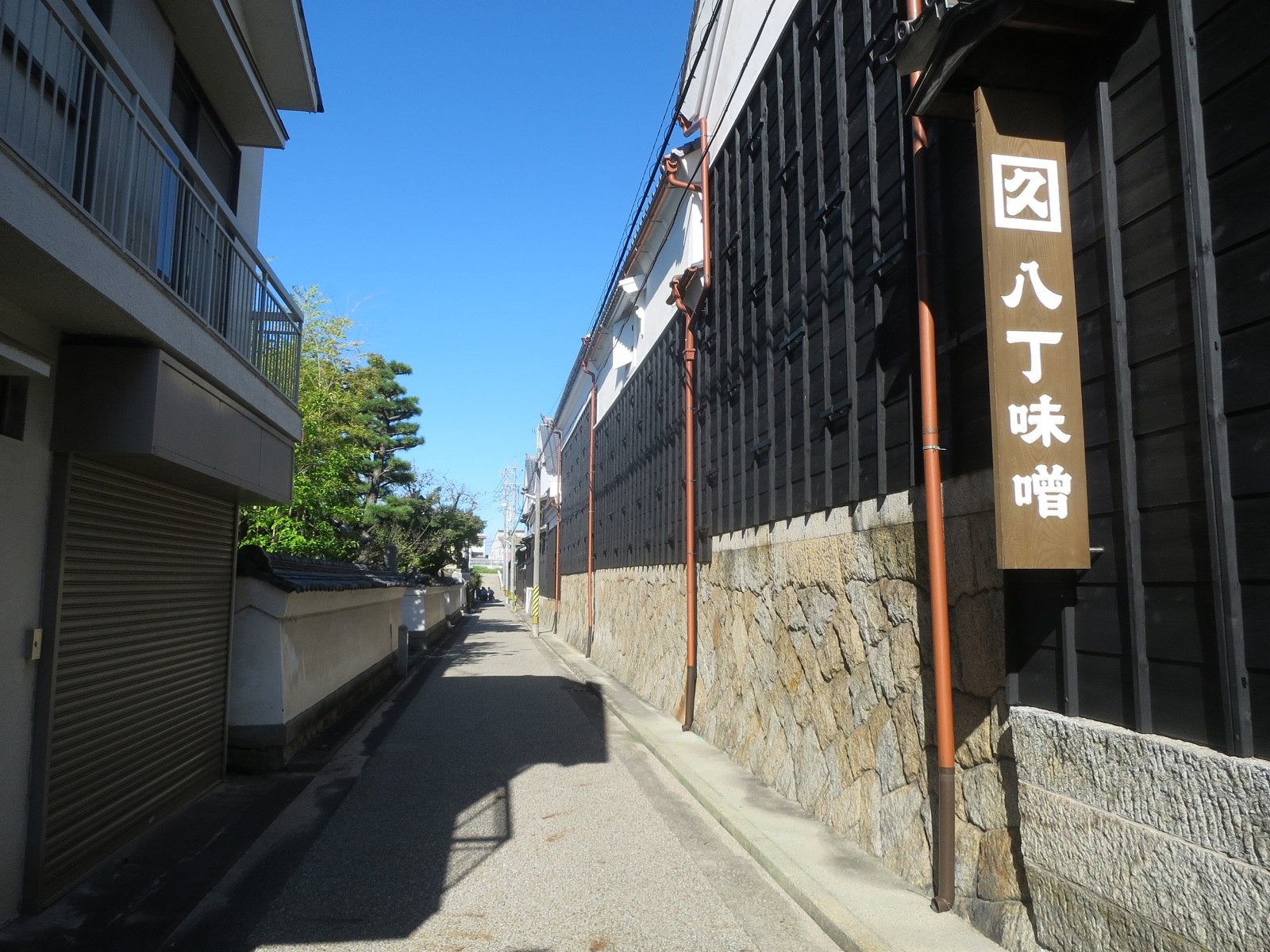
Hatchō town

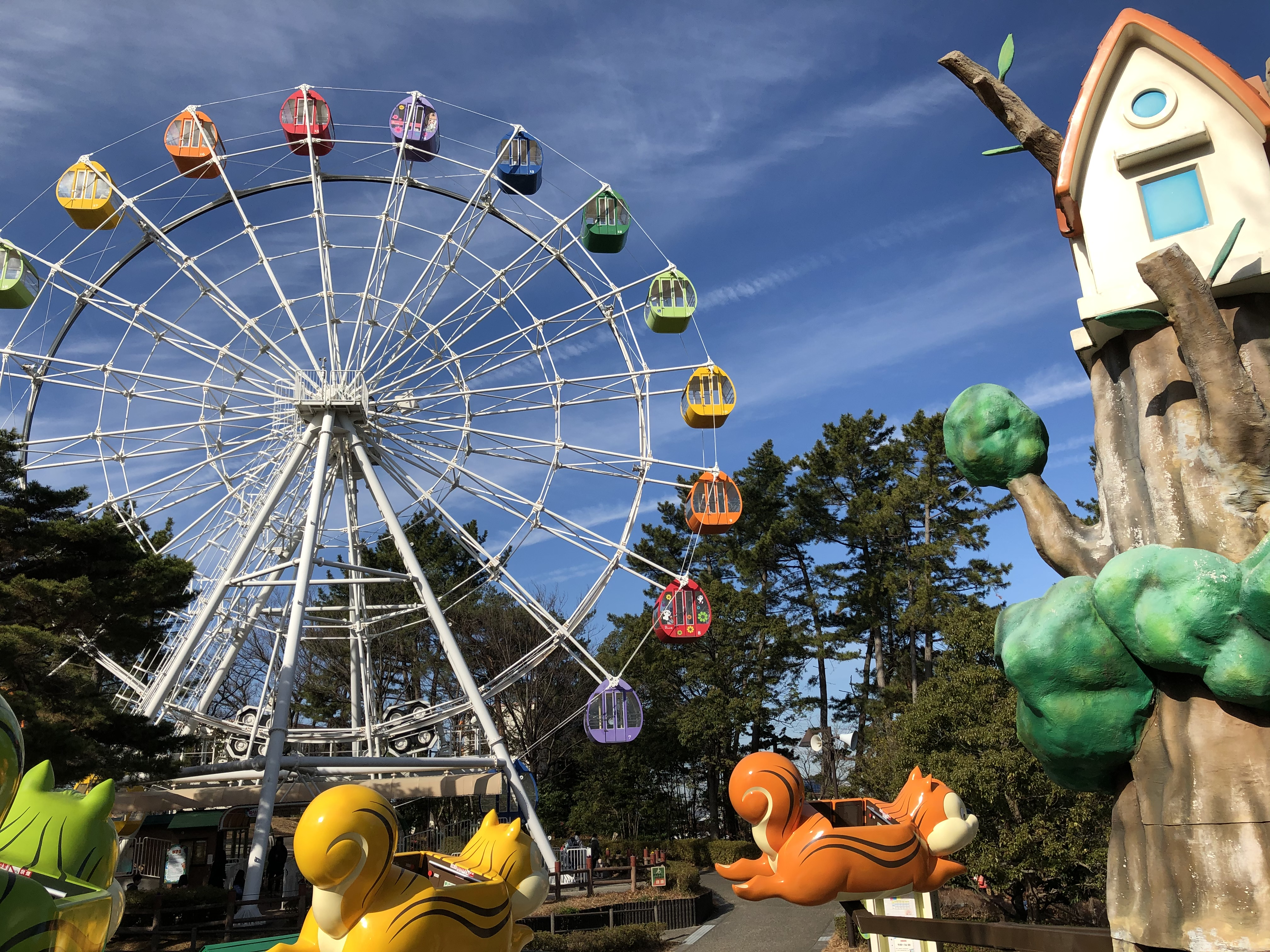
OkazakiMinami Park

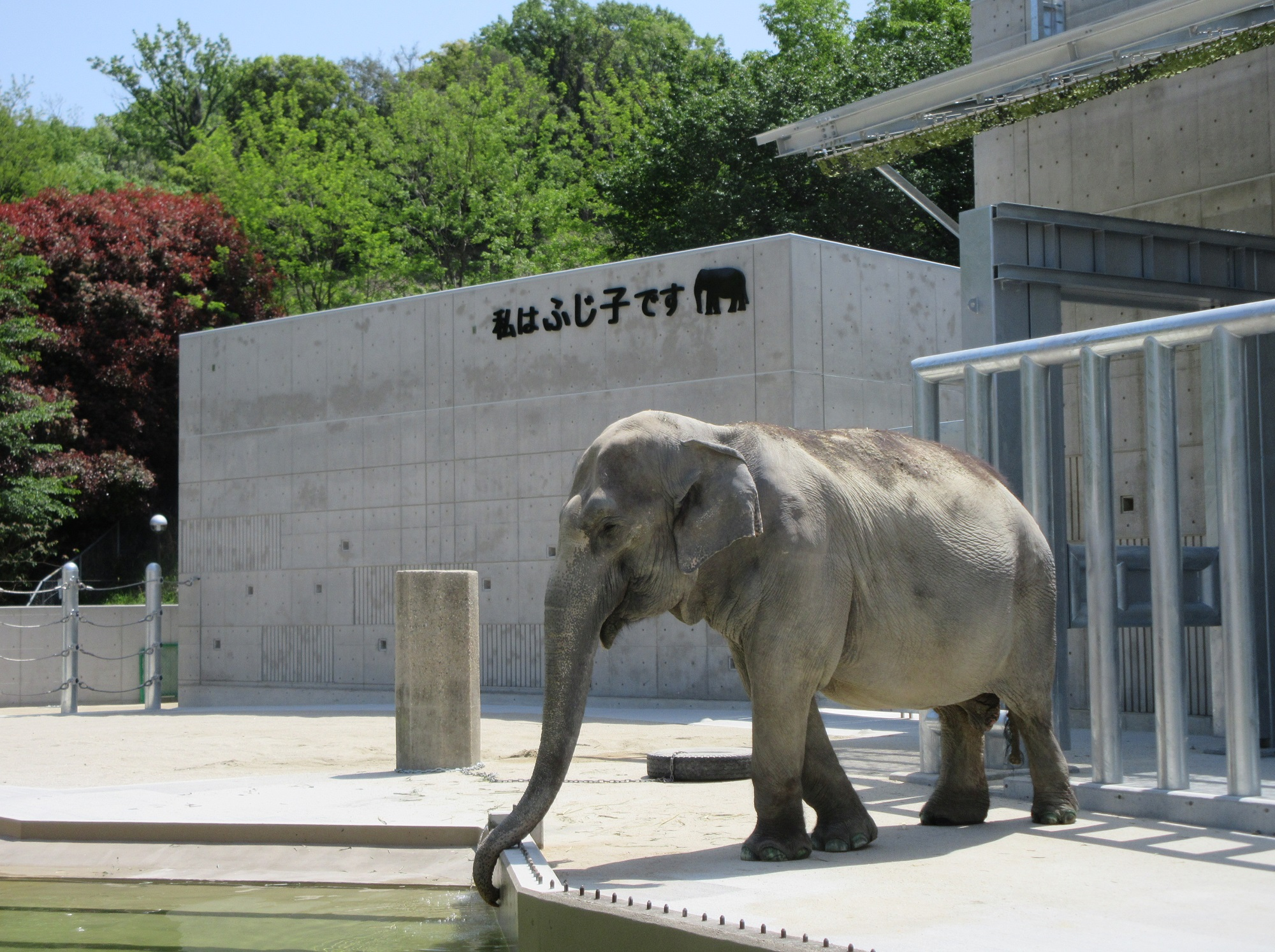
OkazakiHigashi Park Zoo

== History ==
=== Origins ===
The area around present-day Okazaki has been inhabited for many thousands of years. Archaeologists have found remains from the Japanese Paleolithic period. Numerous remains from the Jōmon period, and especially from the Yayoi and Kofun periods, have been found, including many kofun burial mounds.

=== Sengoku period ===
During the Sengoku period, the area was controlled by the Matsudaira clan, a branch of which later rose to prominence as the Tokugawa clan, who ruled Japan during the Edo period.

=== Edo period ===
During this time, Okazaki Domain, a feudal han was established to rule the immediate area around Okazaki and was entrusted to a fudai daimyō. Several smaller domains were in the present-day city limits, including Fukozu (later Mikawa-Nakajima), Okudono Domain and Nishi-Ohira Domain. The town prospered as a post station on the Tōkaidō connecting Edo with Kyoto.

=== Meiji period ===
Following the Meiji Restoration, the modern town of Okazaki was established on October 1, 1889 with the establishment of the modern municipalities system in Nukata District of Aichi Prefecture. On October 1, 1914, Okazaki annexed neighboring Hirohata Town. Okazaki was proclaimed a city on July 1, 1916.

The city suffered damage in both the 1944 Tōnankai earthquake (which killed 9 people) and the 1945 Mikawa earthquake (which killed 29 people). During World War II, the July 19, 1945 Bombing of Okazaki killed over 200 people and destroyed most of the city center. Although Okazaki was the location of an Imperial Japanese Navy airfield, military installations were not damaged in the attack.

=== Modern Okazaki ===
In 1955, through a series of mergers and consolidations, the area of Okazaki expanded considerably. The former towns of Iwazu, Fukuoka, and Yahagi, and the villages of Motojuku, Yamanaka, Kawai, Fujikawa, and Ryugai were all merged into Okazaki. The 1959 Isewan Typhoon caused considerable damage, and killed 27 residents. On October 15, 1962, Okazaki annexed the neighboring town of Mutsumi.

Okazaki was proclaimed a core city on April 1, 2003, with increased autonomy from the prefectural government. On January 1, 2006, the town of Nukata (from Nukata District) was merged into Okazaki.

== Government ==
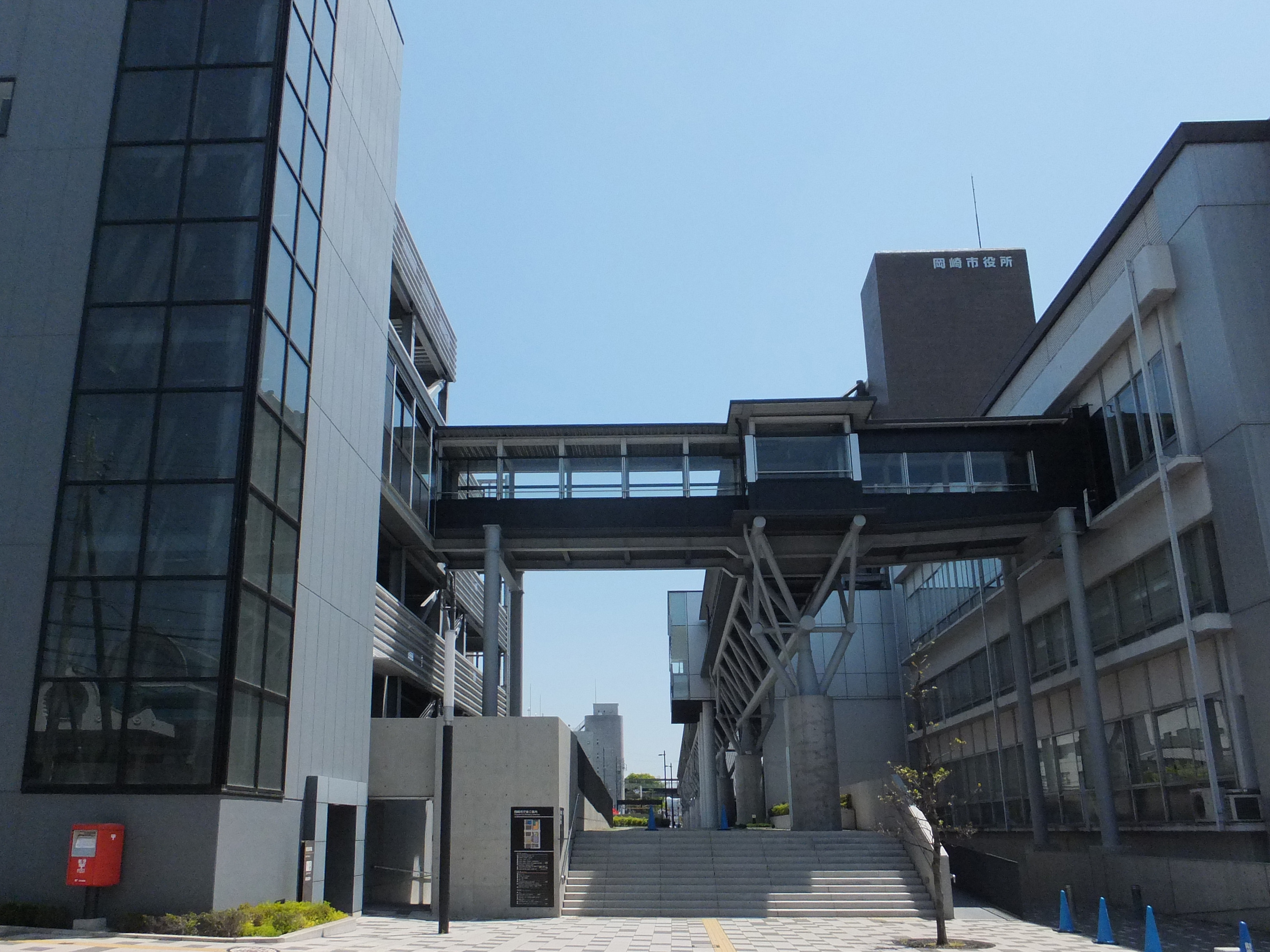
Okazaki City Hall

=== Mayor-council ===
Okazaki has a mayor-council form of government with a directly elected mayor and a unicameral city legislature of 37 members.

=== Prefectural Assembly ===
The city contributes five members to the Aichi Prefectural Assembly.

=== House of Representatives ===
In terms of national politics, the city is part of Aichi District 12 of the lower house of the Diet of Japan.

== Public ==
=== Police ===
- Aichi Prefectural Police
  - Okazaki police station

=== Firefighting ===
- Okazaki Fire department
  - Okazaki-Naka fire department
  - Okazaki-Higashi fire department
  - Okazaki-Nishi fire department

=== Health care ===
- Hospital
  - Aichi Prefectural Hospital
  - Okazaki City Hospital

=== Post office ===
- Okazaki Post office

=== Library ===
- Okazaki City Library
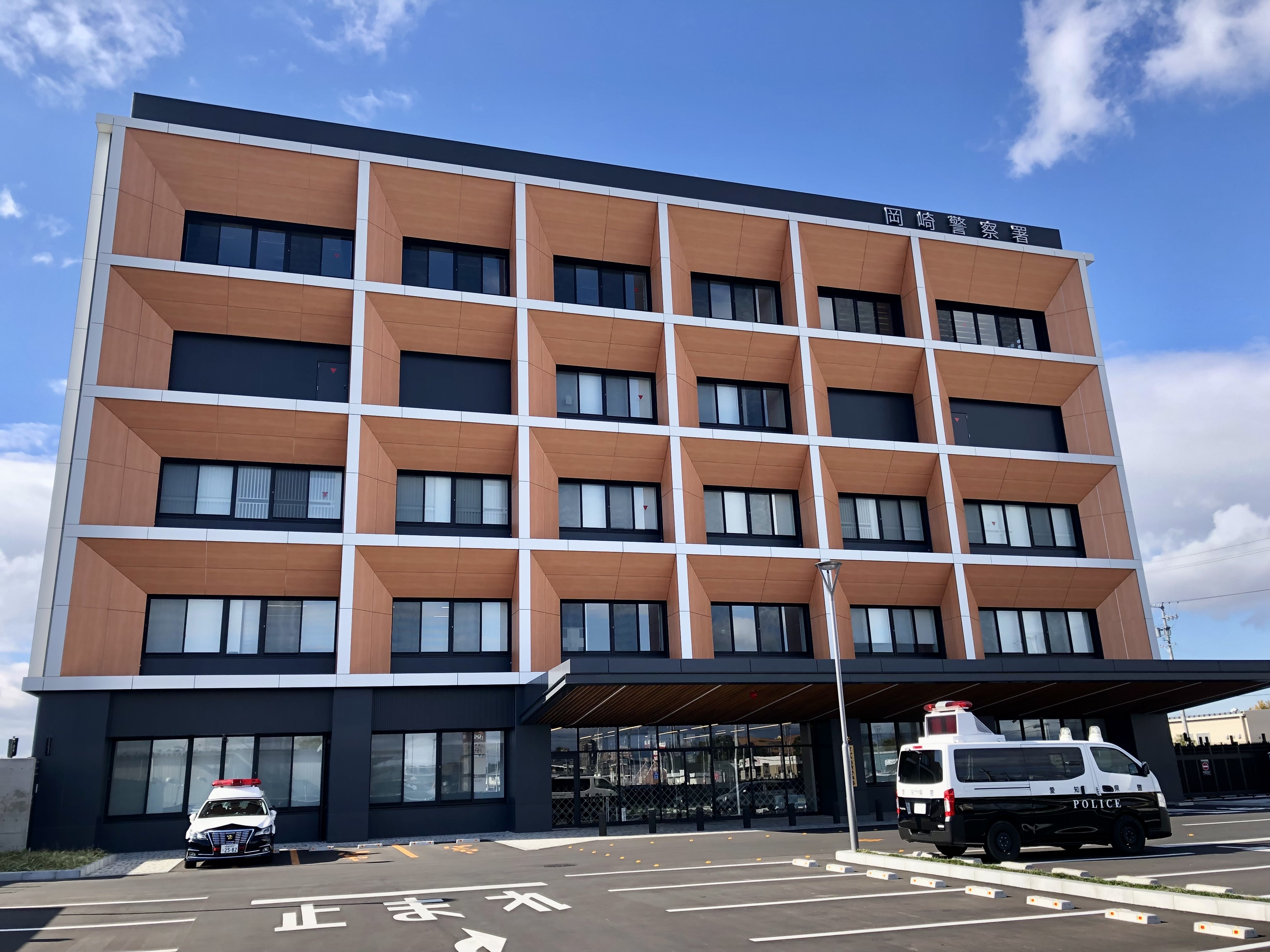
Okazaki Police Station

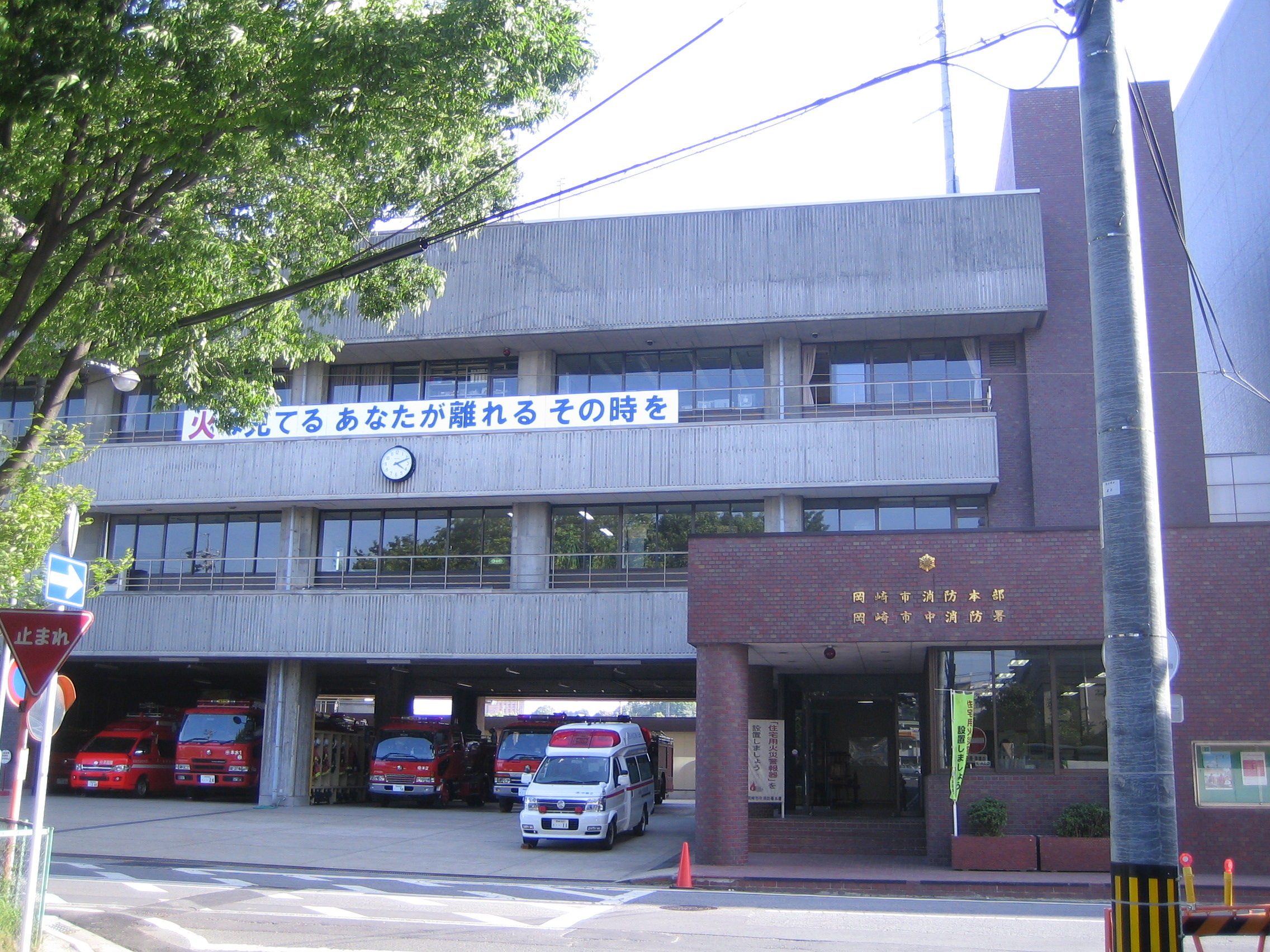
Okazaki Fire Department

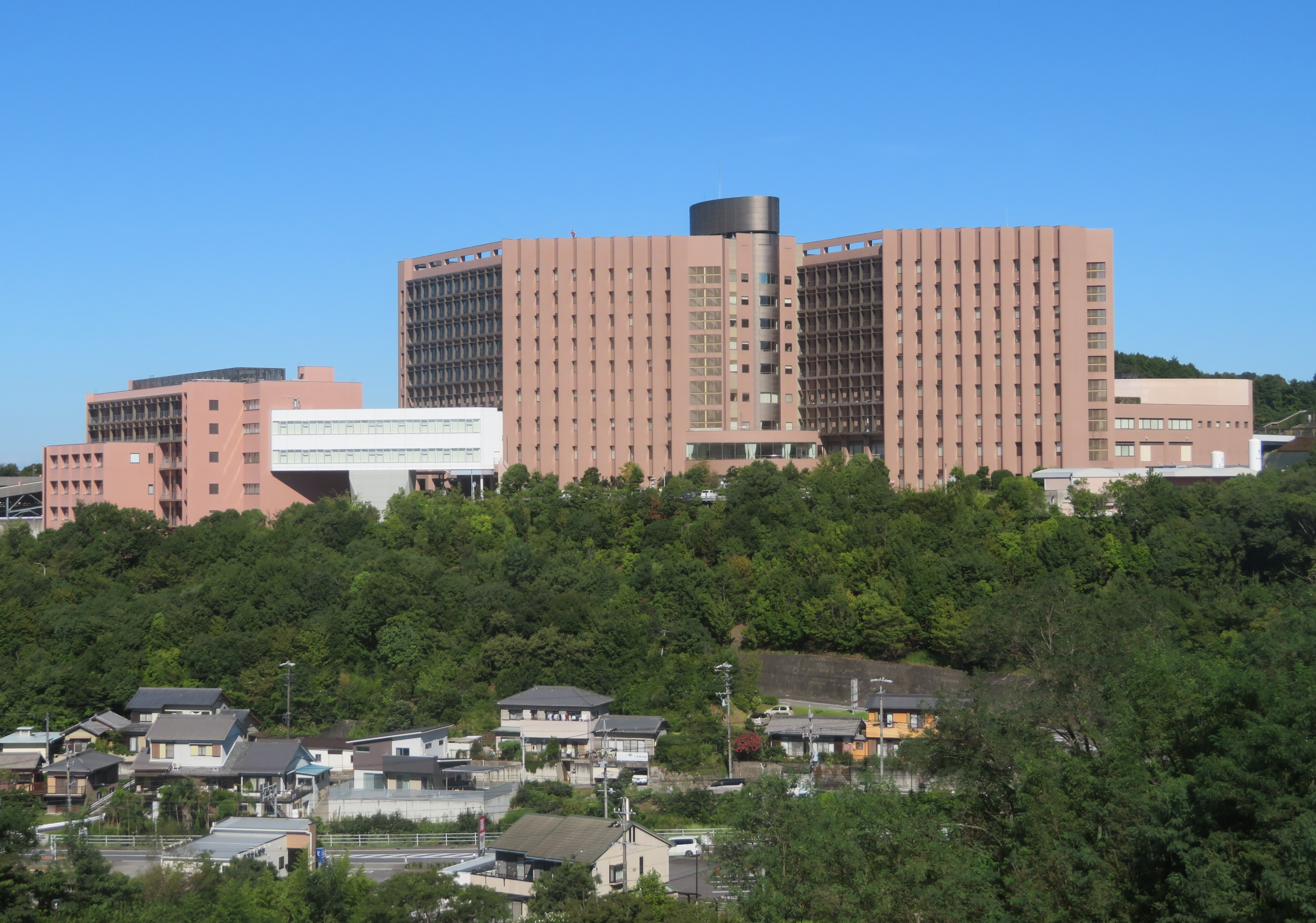
Okazaki City Hospital

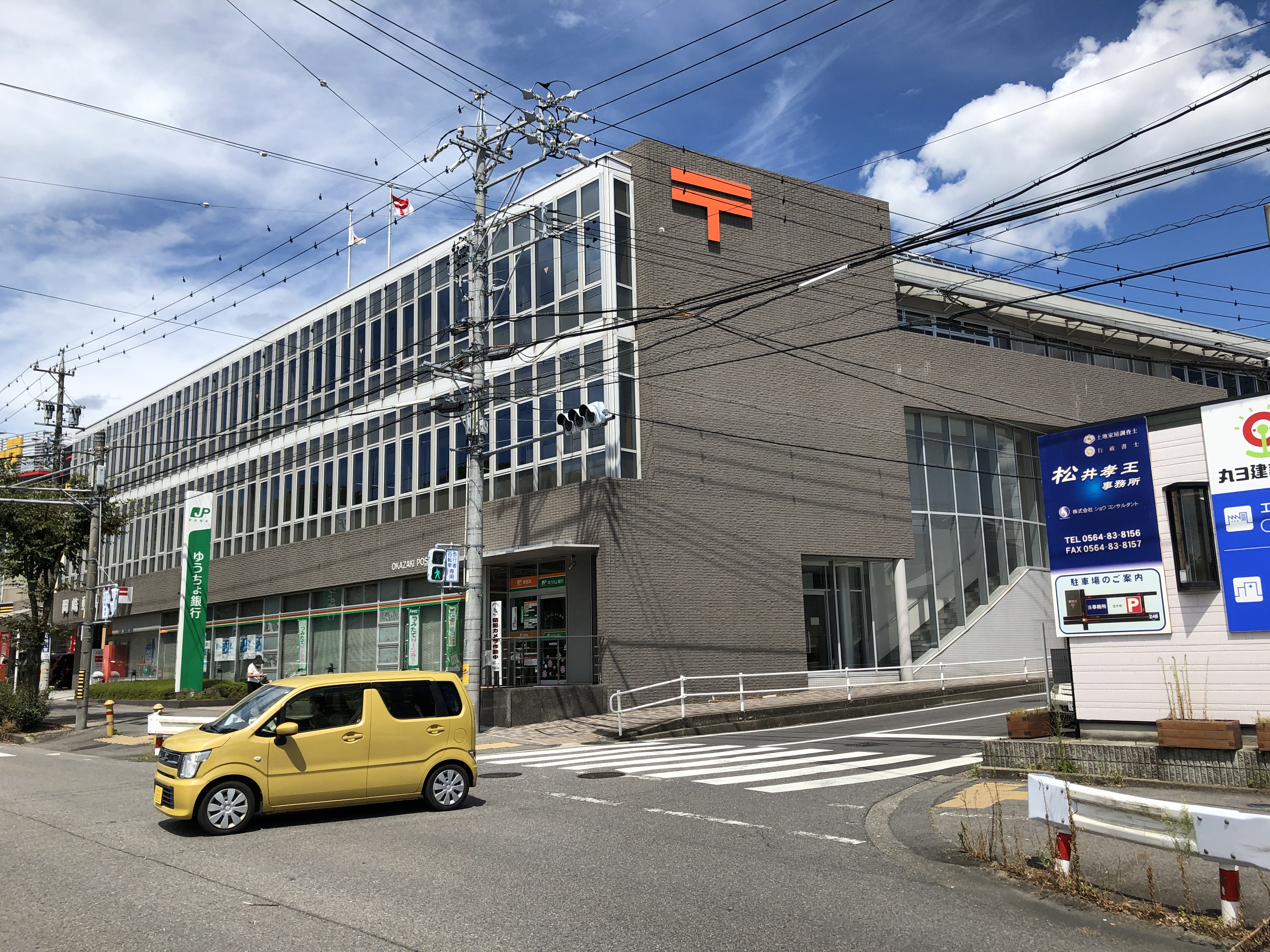
Okazaki Post Office

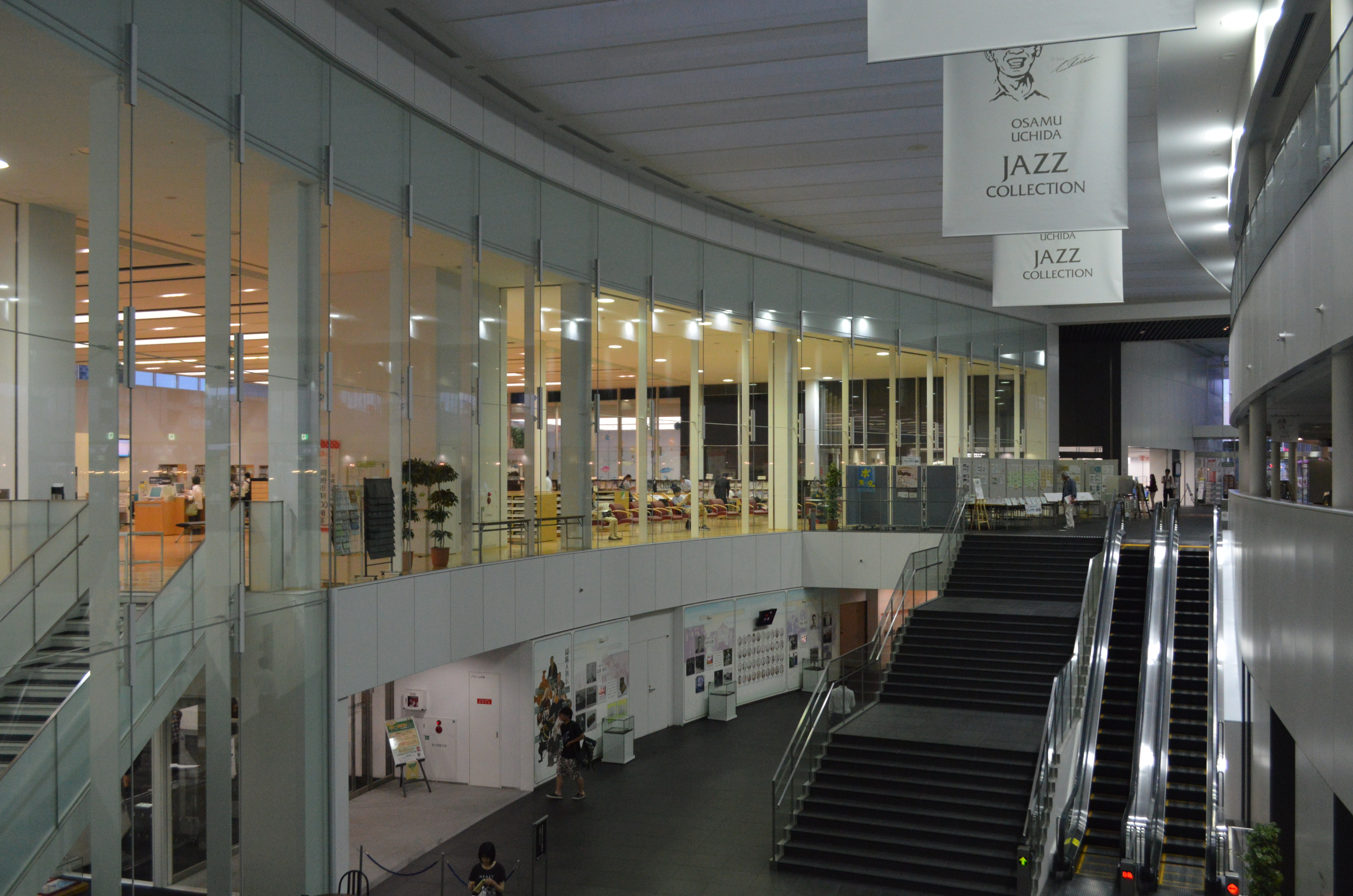
Okazaki City Library and Community Plaza

== Sister cities ==
- Newport Beach, California, United States, since November 1984
- Uddevalla, Sweden, since September 1968
- Hohhot, Inner Mongolia, China since August 1987

== Economy ==
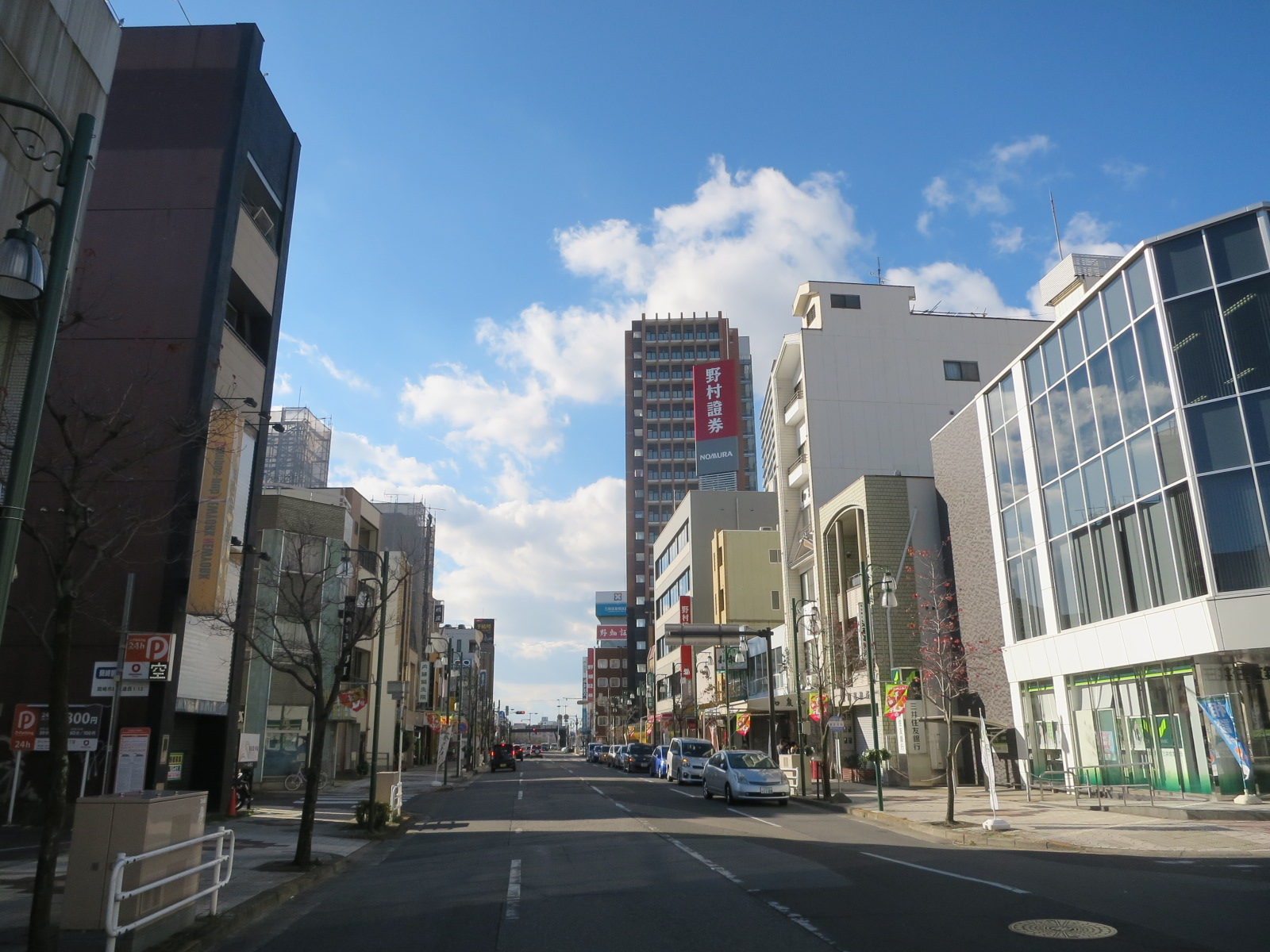
Downtown of Okazaki City

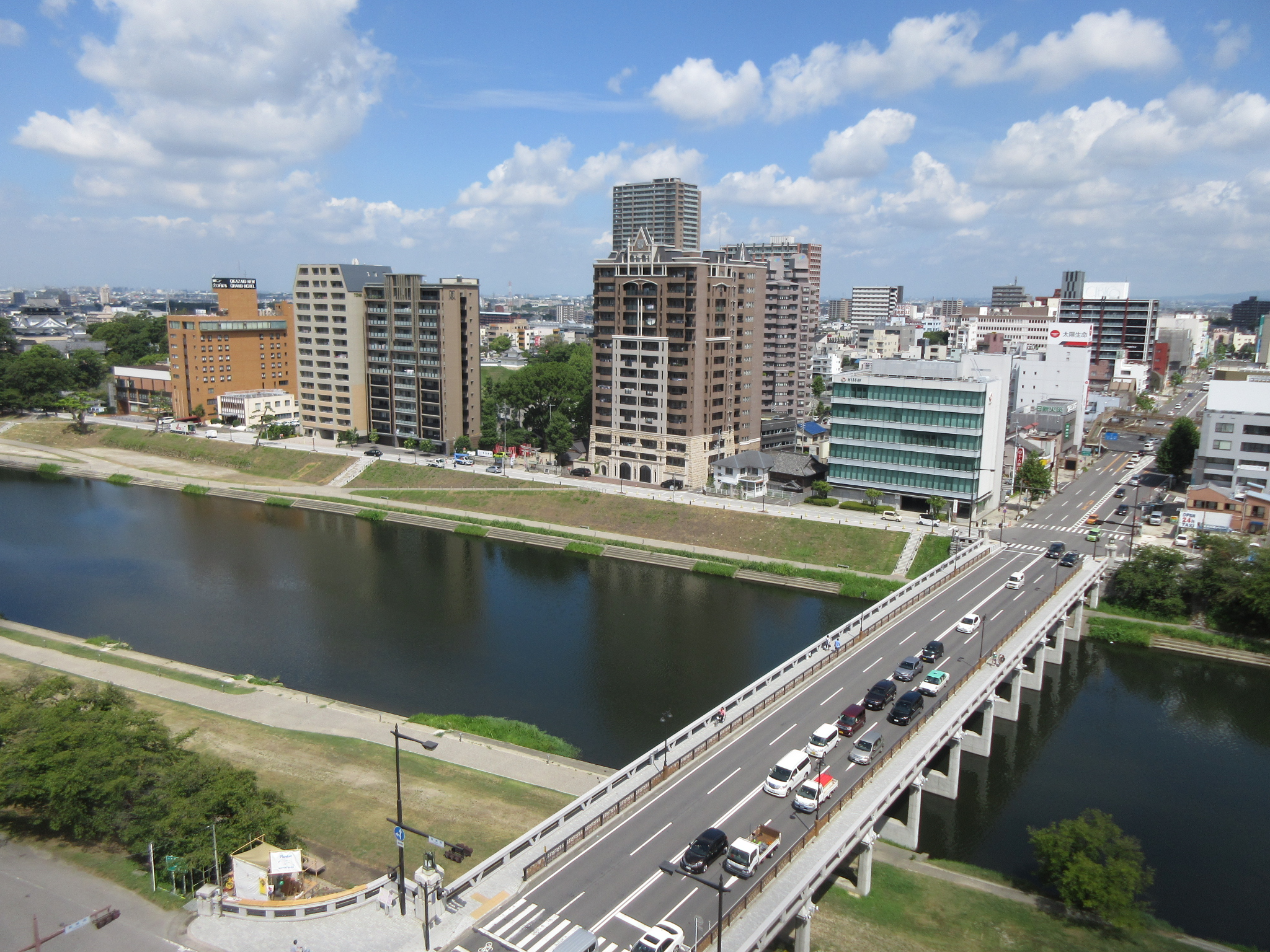
Okazaki CBD

Okazaki was noted in the Meiji period as a centre for textiles and commerce and the production of miso; modern Okazaki is a hub for the chemical and machinery industries.

=== Primary sector of the economy ===
==== Agriculture ====
- Konjac
- Miso
- Tea

Japan Agricultural Cooperatives

- JA Aichi Mikawa

==== Forestry ====
- Cryptomeria
- Chamaecyparis obtusa

Forest Association

- Okazaki Forest Association

=== Secondary sector of the economy ===
The area has historically been one of the main centres of the production of stone tōrō (Japanese lanterns). The traditional stonemasonry there was registered by the government as a Japanese craft in 1979.

- Mitsubishi Motors Okazaki Factory

=== Tertiary sector of the economy ===
Shopping center

- APiTA Okazaki-Kita
- Æon Mall Okazaki
- Æon Town Okazaki-Miai
- Com Town
- EruEru Town
- Luvit Park
- Okazaki CIBICO
- Oto Riverside Terrace
- Resupa
- Wing Town
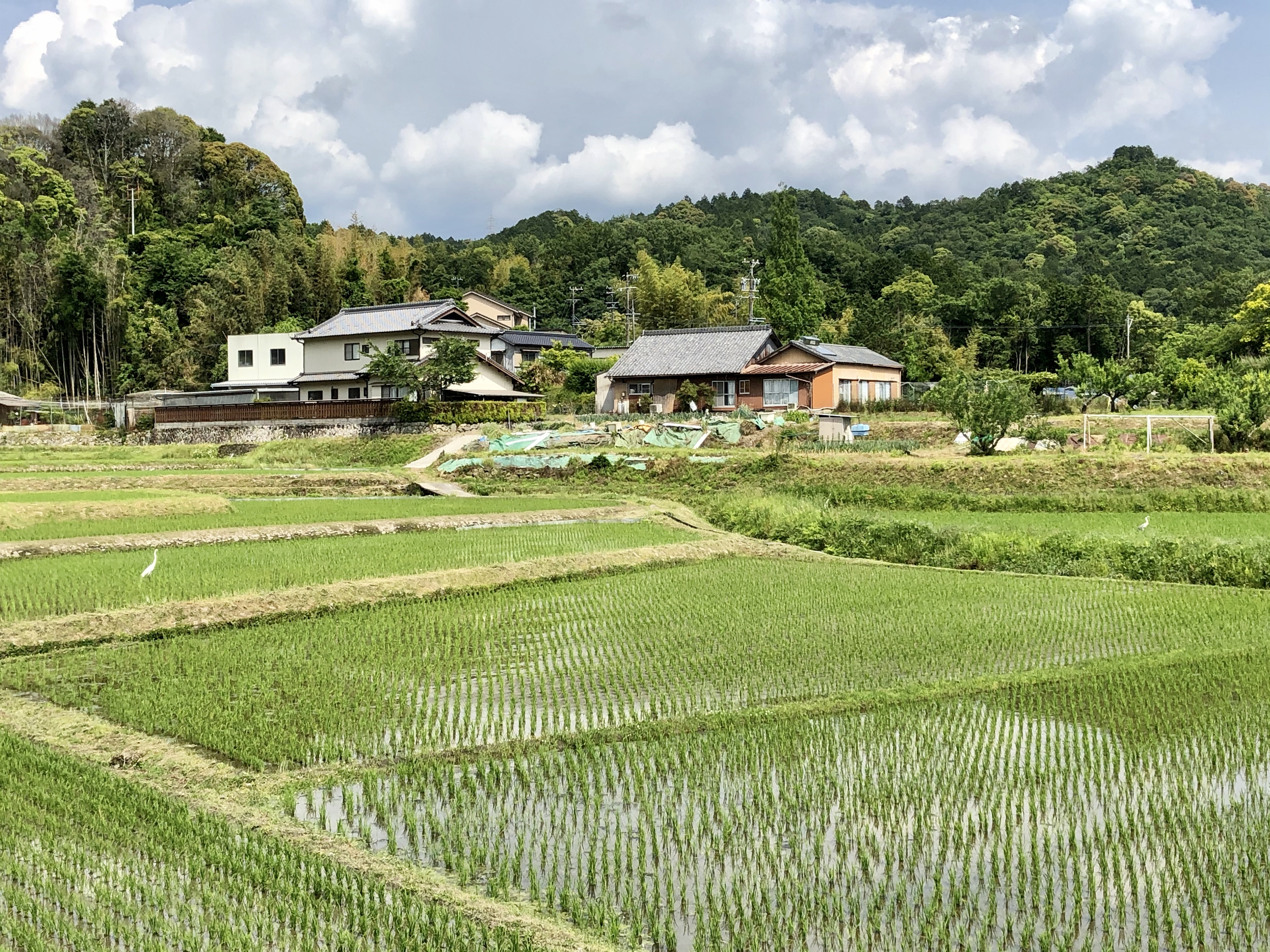
Paddy field in Iwanaka Town

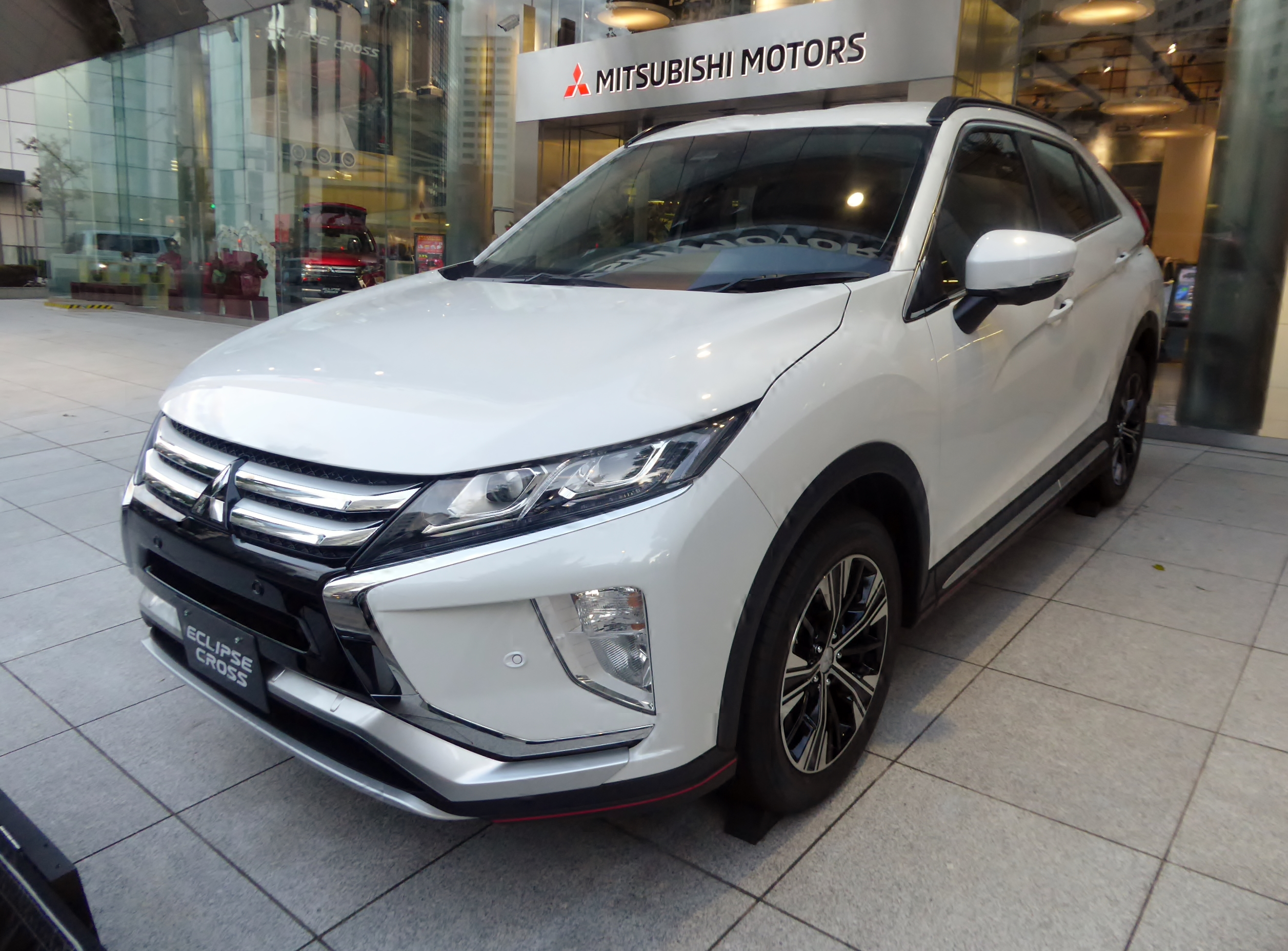
Mitsubishi Eclipse Cross

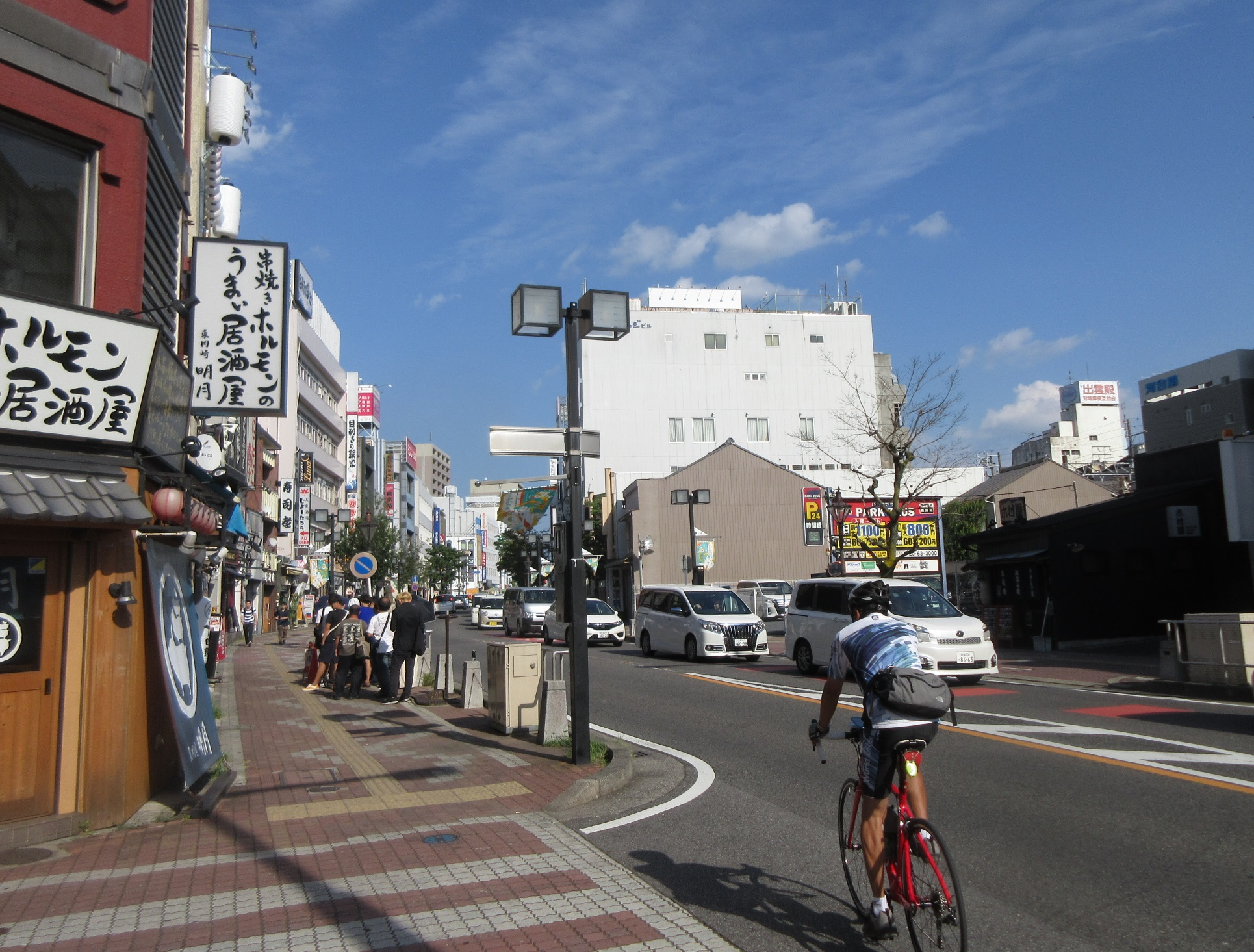
Shopping Street

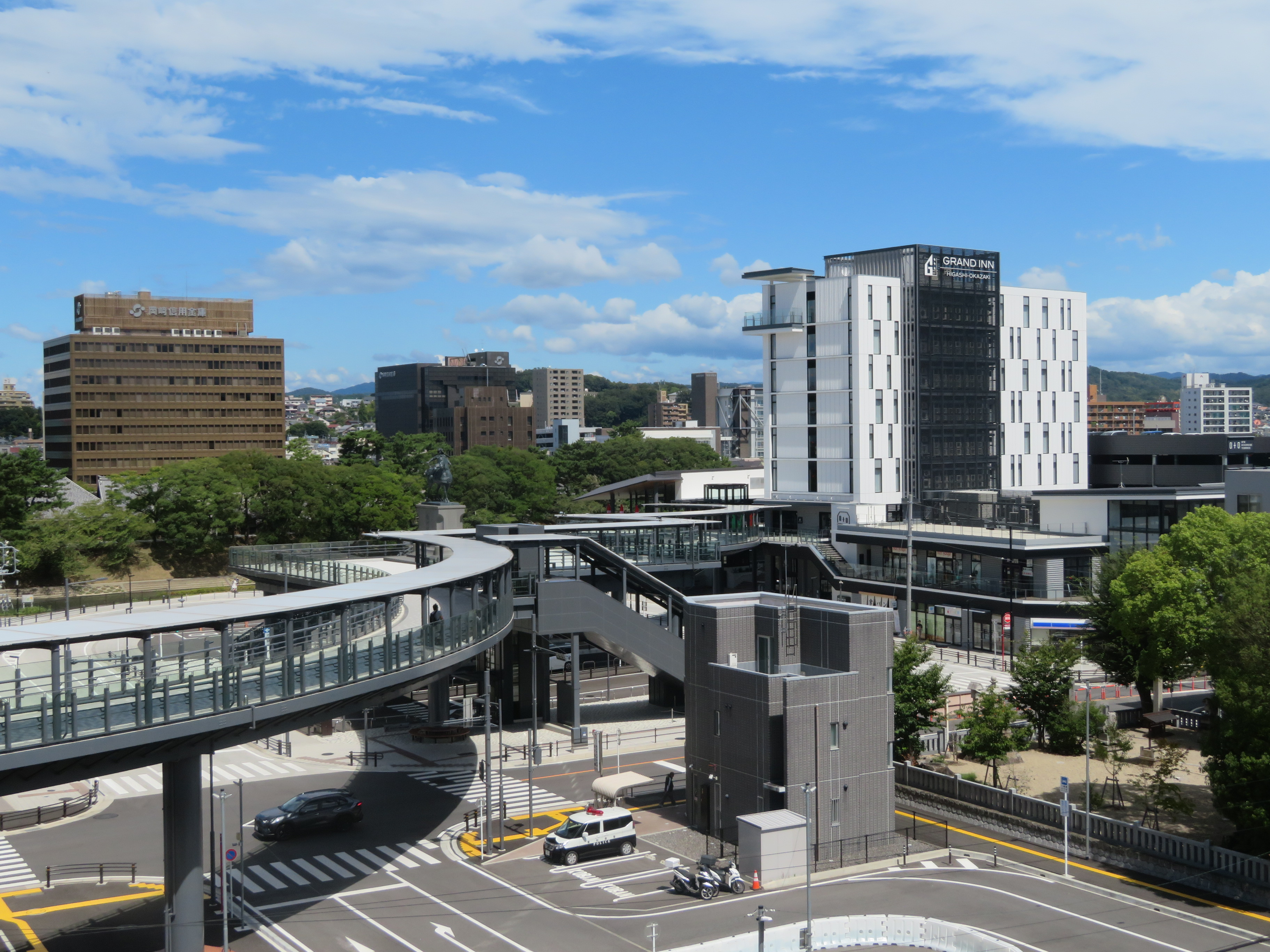
Oto Riverside Terrace

== Education ==
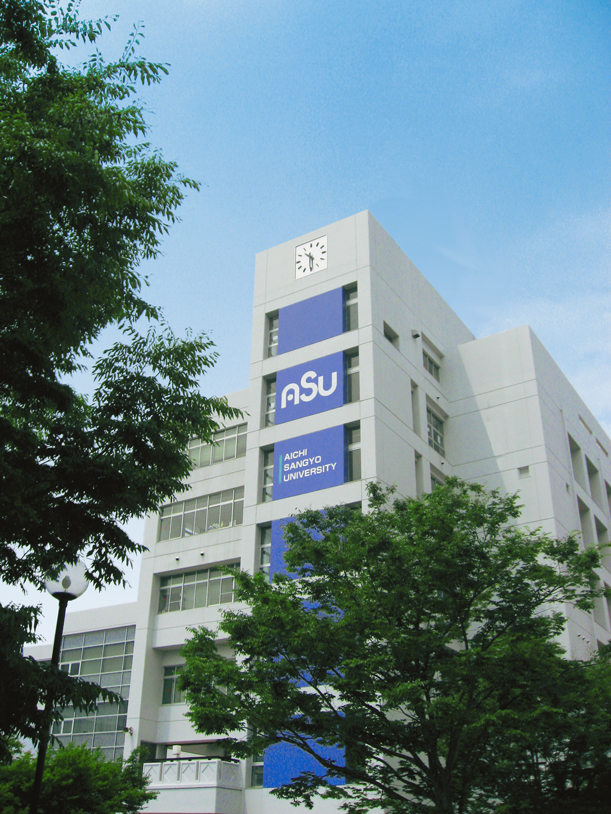
Aichi Sangyo University

=== Universities and colleges ===
- National Institutes of Natural Sciences
- National Institute for Physiological Sciences
- National Institute for Basic Biology
- Aichi Gakusen University
- Aichi Gakusen College
- Aichi Sangyo University
- Aichi Sangyo University Junior College
- University of Human Environments
- Okazaki Women's Junior College
- Yamasa Institute

=== Primary and secondary schools ===
Okazaki has 48 public elementary schools and 21 public junior high schools operated by the city government, and one private middle school. The city has seven public high schools operated by the Aichi Prefectural Board of Education and four private high schools, including the Hikarigaoka Girls' High School. The prefecture also operates four special education schools for the handicapped, and the national government operates one special education school as well.

The city formerly housed the Escola São Paulo, a Brazilian international school.

== Transportation ==
=== Railway ===
==== Highspeed rail ====
The Tōkaidō Shinkansen passes through Okazaki city limits but does not stop. The nearest Shinkansen stations are Toyohashi, Mikawa-Anjō and Nagoya.

==== Conventional lines ====
Central Japan Railway Company

- Tōkaidō Main Line: Okazaki • Nishi-Okazaki

Meitetsu

- Nagoya Line: Motojuku • Meiden-Yamanaka • Fujikawa • Miai • Otogawa • Higashi-Okazaki • Okazakikōen-mae • Yahagibashi • Utō

Aichi Loop Line Co Ltd

- Aichi Loop Line: Okazaki • Mutsuna • Naka-Okazaki • Kita-Okazaki • Daimon • Kitano-Masuzuka

=== Roads ===
==== Highways ====
- Tōmei Expressway (Asian Highway Network AH1)
- Shin-Tōmei Expressway

==== Japan National Route ====
- National Route 1
- National Route 248
- National Route 301
- National Route 473
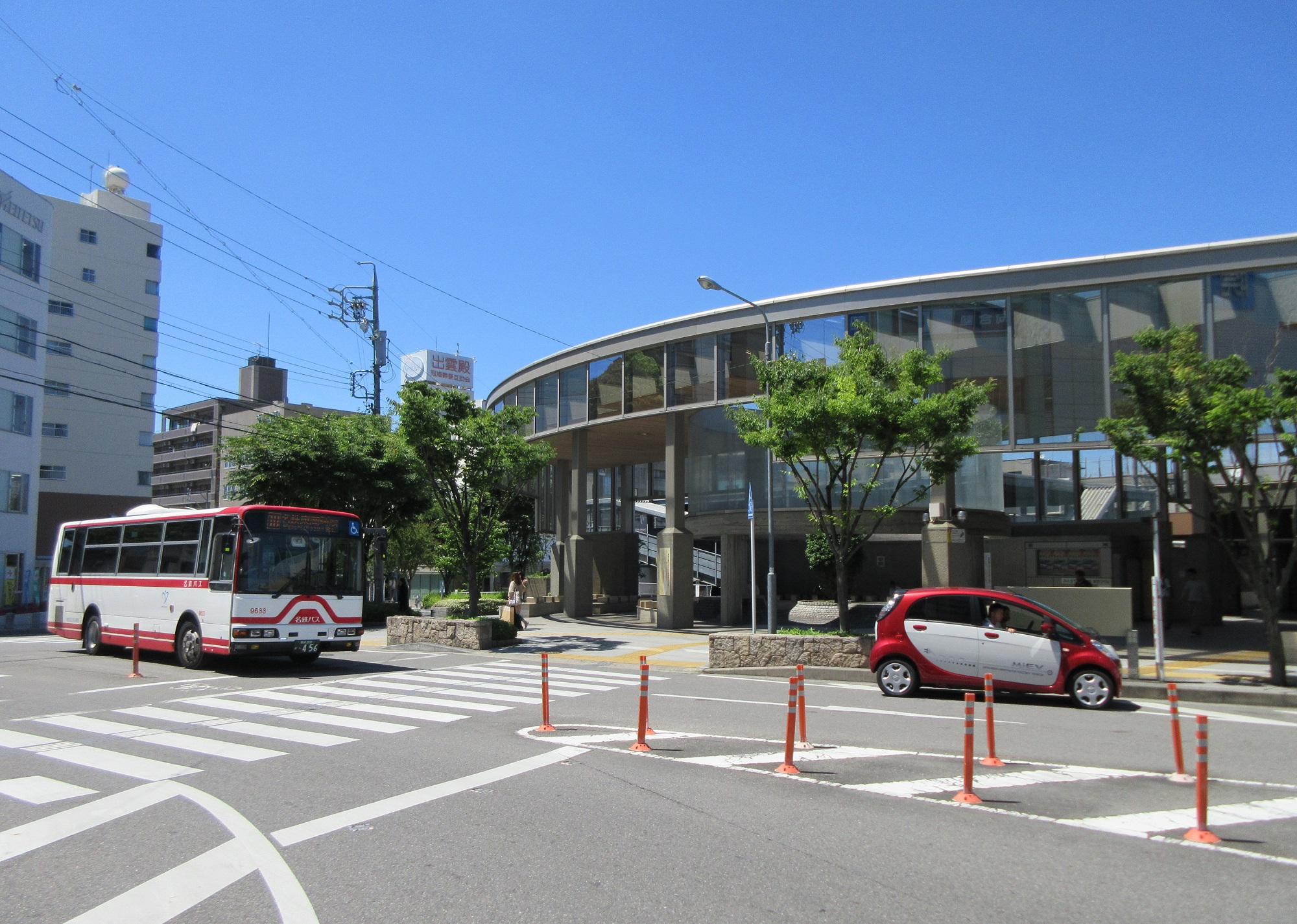
Higashi-Okazaki Station

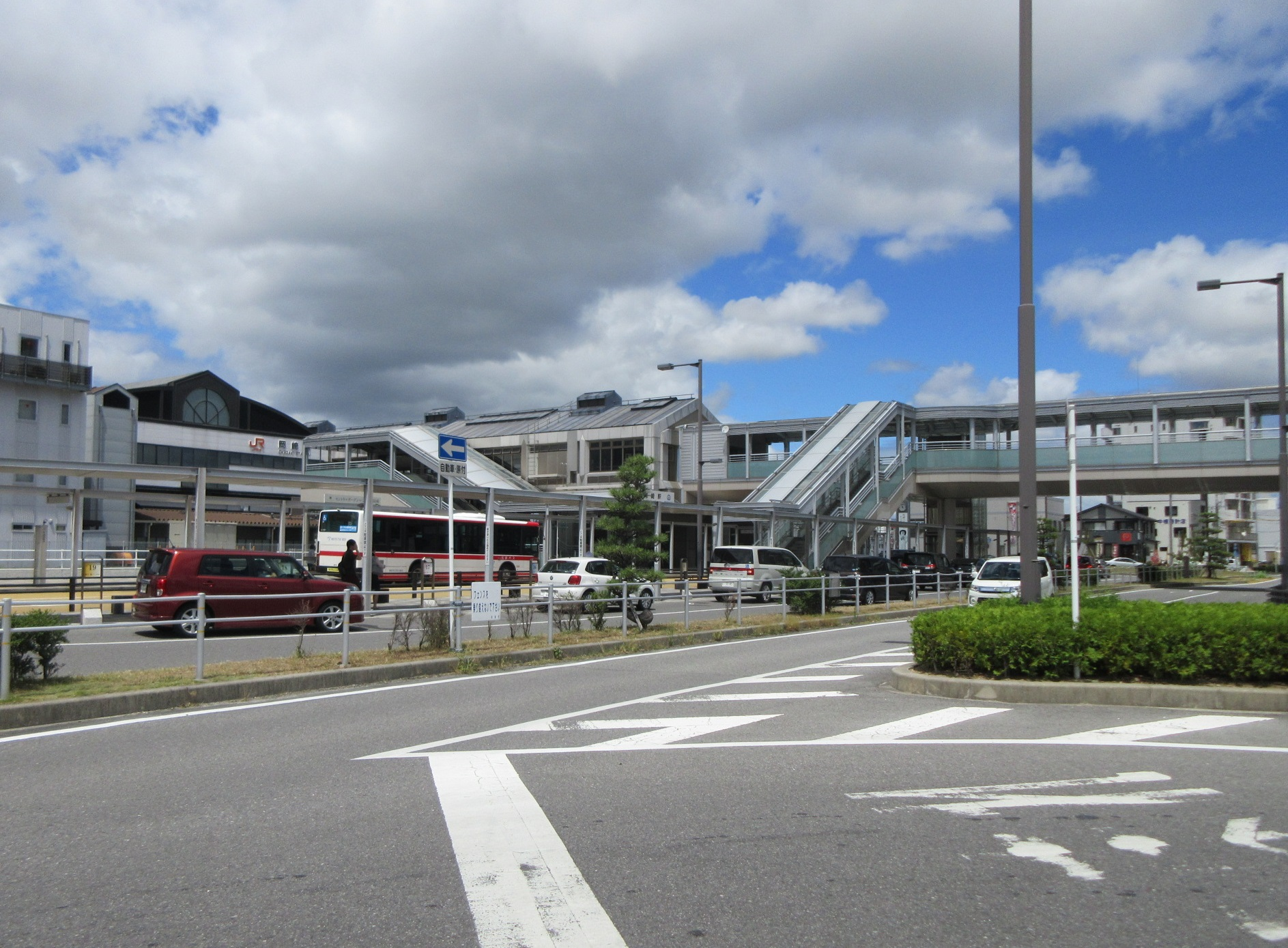
Okazaki Station

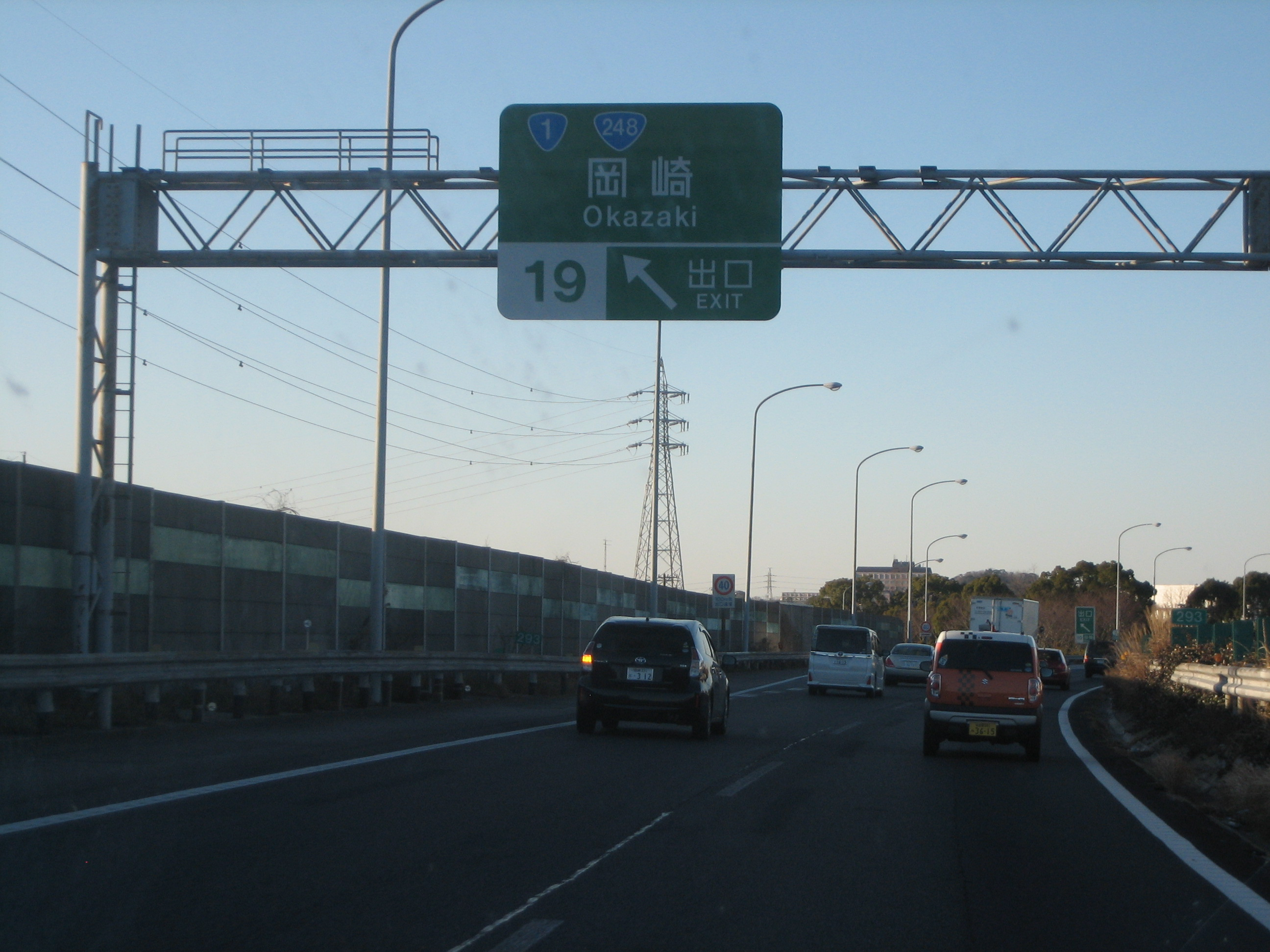
Okazaki IC

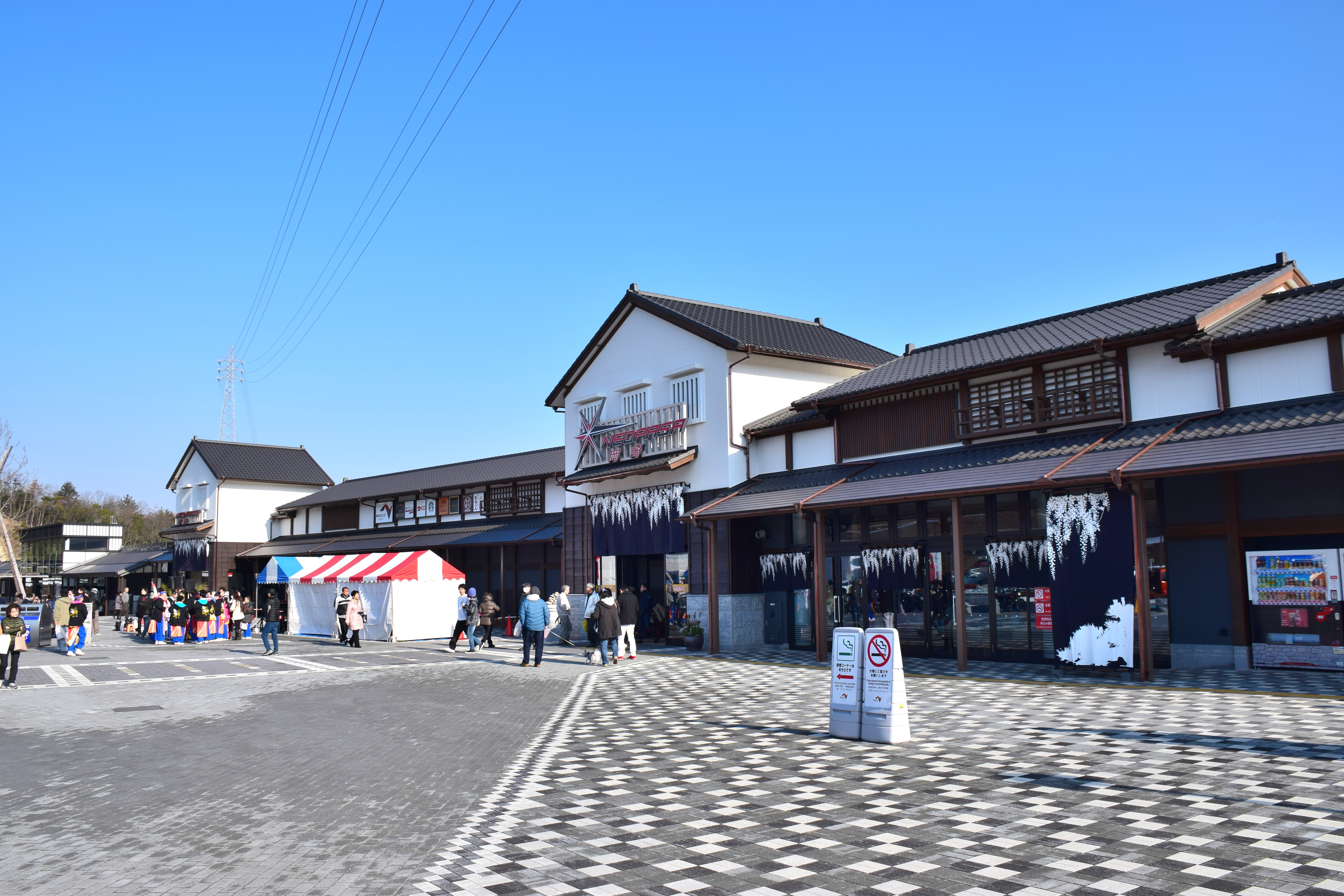
Okazaki SA

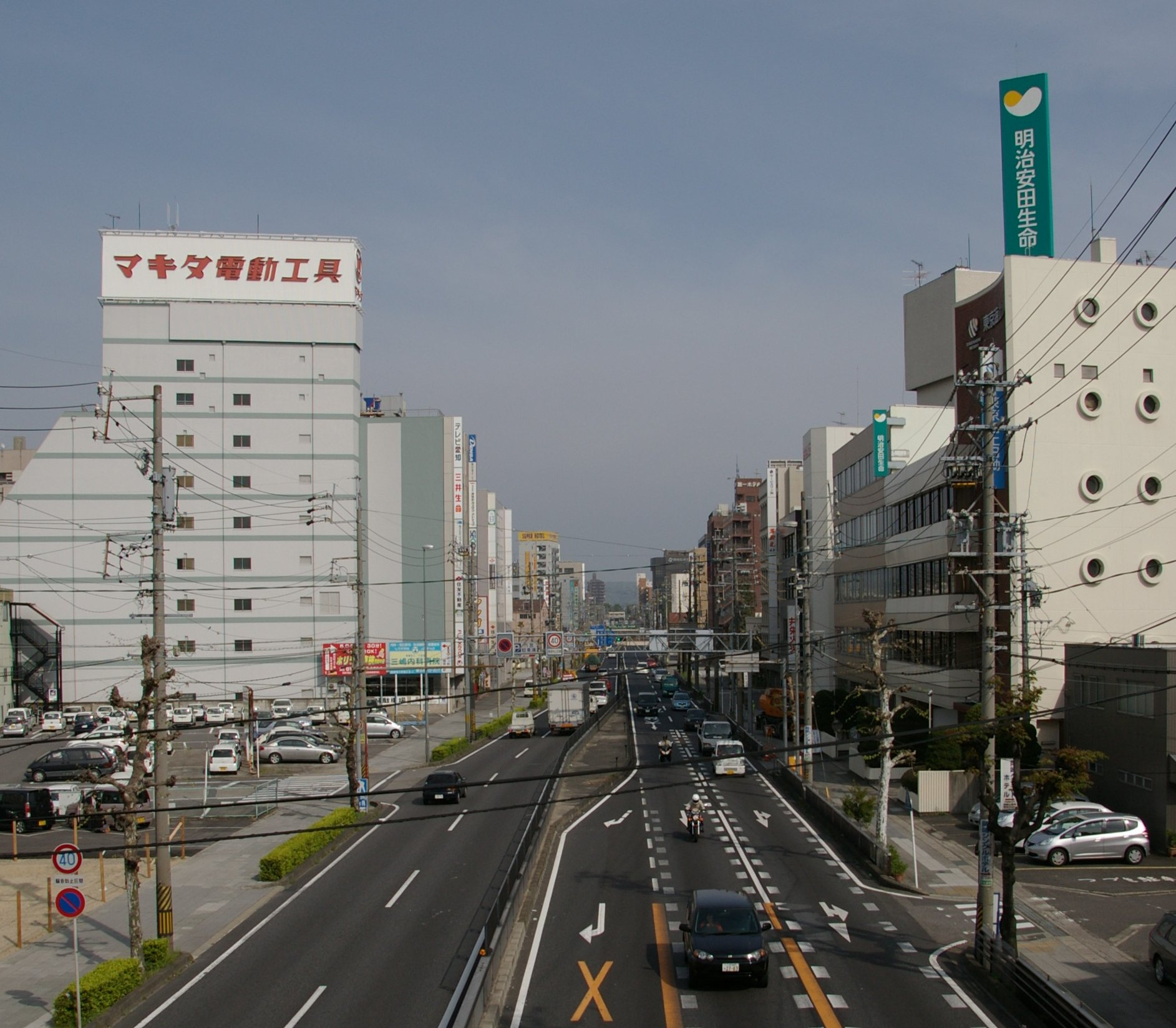
Okazaki Japan National Route 1

==== Air transport ====
Okazaki is served by Chūbu Centrair International Airport, located 67 km (42 mi) south west of the city.

== Local attractions ==
=== Okazaki Castle ===
Okazaki Castle was originally built in 1455. Captured by the Matsudaira clan in 1524 (and probably relocated from the other side of the river), the castle remains associated with Tokugawa Ieyasu, even though the latter transferred to Edo in 1590. During the Edo period it served as the seat of the Okazaki Domain and dominated the city until the Meiji Restoration.

=== Fireworks ===
Okazaki is famous for its fireworks. The Tokugawa shogunate restricted production of gunpowder outside of the immediate region of Okazaki (with few exceptions). Even today, more than 70% of Japan's fireworks are designed and manufactured here. A large fireworks festival, which people from all over Japan come to see, is held annually on the first Saturday in August in the area surrounding Okazaki Castle.

=== Hatchō miso ===
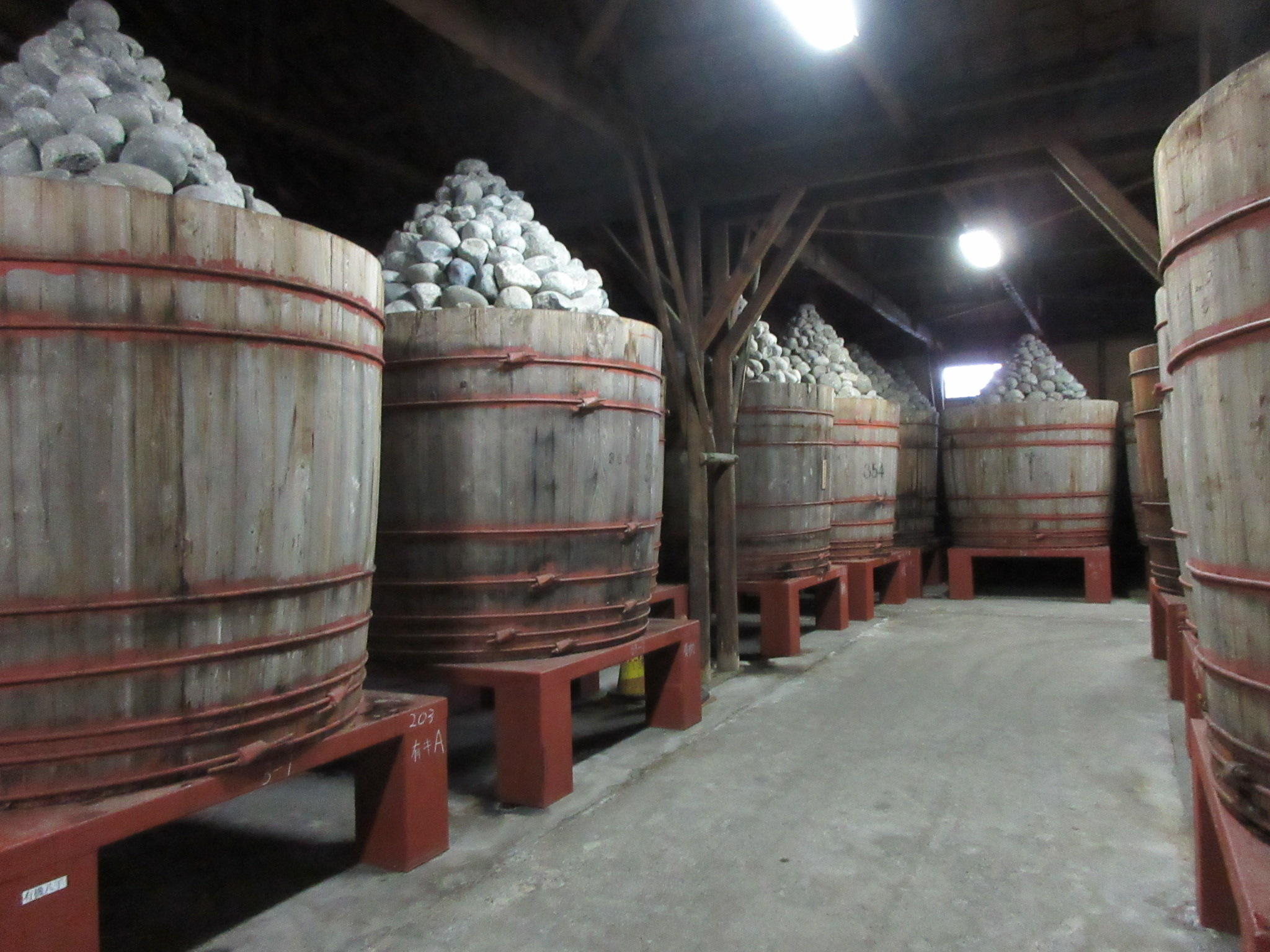
Hatchō miso fermenting in barrels in Okazaki

Hatchō miso (八丁味噌) is a dark miso paste made using a process of steaming soybeans (instead of boiling) followed by maturation in cedar barrels under the weight of 3 tons of carefully stacked river stones for at least 2 years. Located 8 chō (hatchō, or approximately 900m) west of Okazaki Castle near the Yahagi river, there are two 8-cho miso companies — Maruya from 1337 and Kakukyu.

The old tiled buildings are heritage-listed and Kaku has been a family business for 18 generations. It is one of the most famous miso producers in Japan, supplying the Emperor by appointment, and popular as a health food. A 2006 NHK morning drama serial, Junjo Kirari (Sparkling Innocence), was largely filmed in and around the Hatchō miso grounds. Tours are available every 30 minutes and free samples are provided. Hatchō miso's health properties are considered so great that it was donated to Chernobyl's citizens following the disaster, to help prevent and treat radiation sickness.

=== Takisan ===
The Buddhist temple of Takisan-ji (7th century) includes several Important Cultural Properties of Japan. The main hall is from the Kamakura period and is the location of a fire festival held each February on the closest Saturday to the lunar calendar New Year. The distinctive Sanmon gate and the main image are designated as important cultural properties. Adjoining the temple is Takisan Tōshō-gū, a Shinto Shrine built in 1646 by Tokugawa Iemitsu.

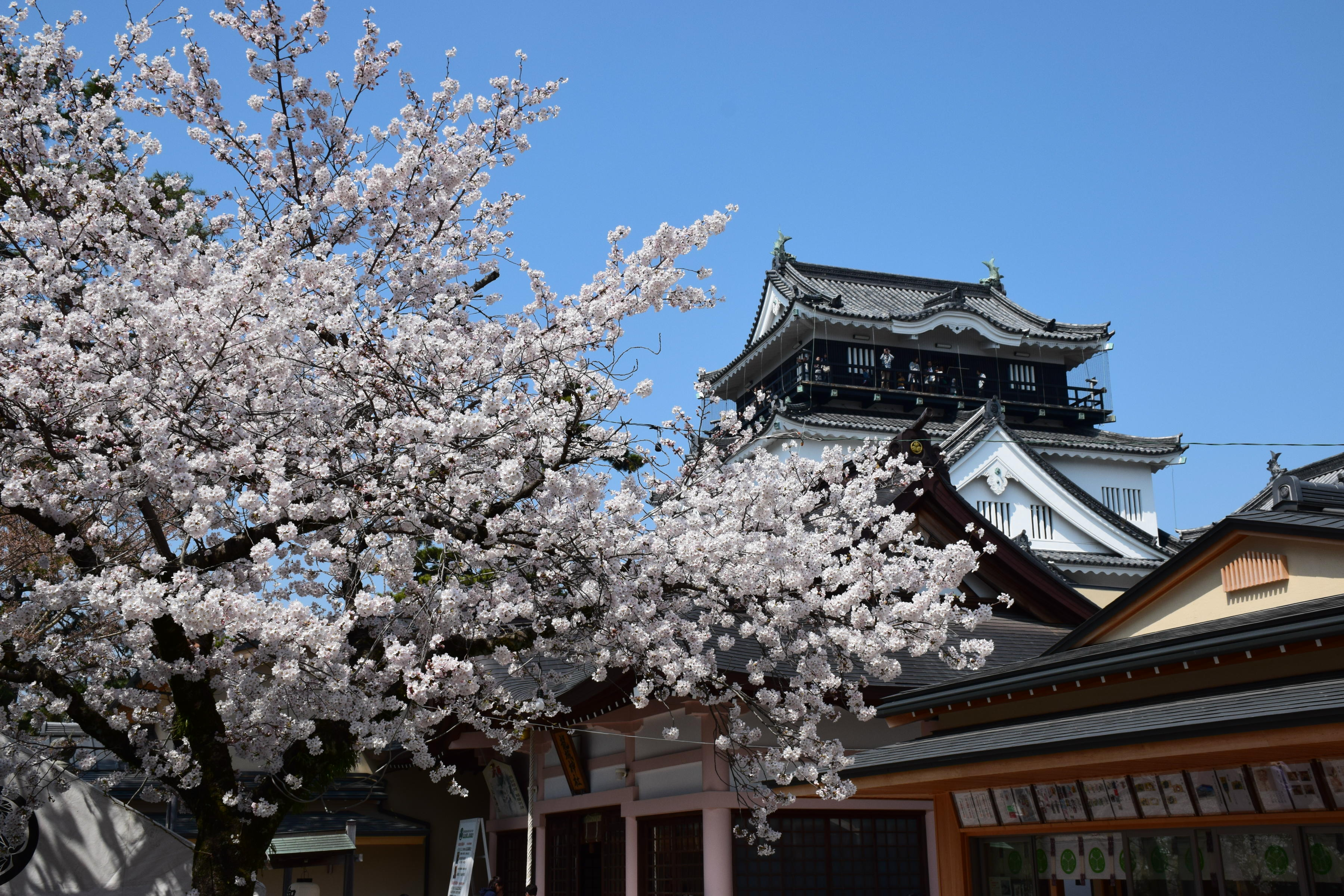
Okazaki Castle

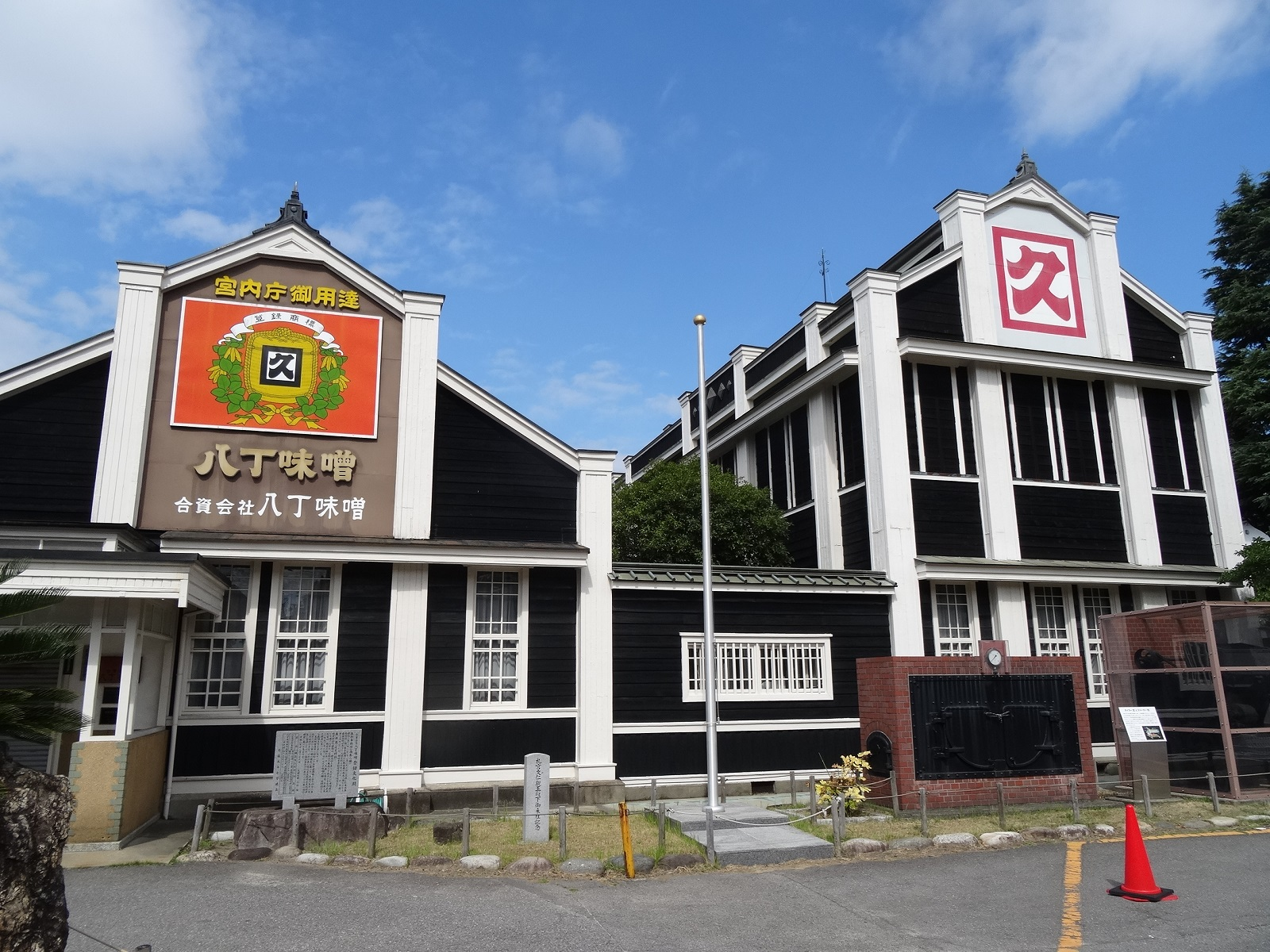
Hatcho miso kakukyu

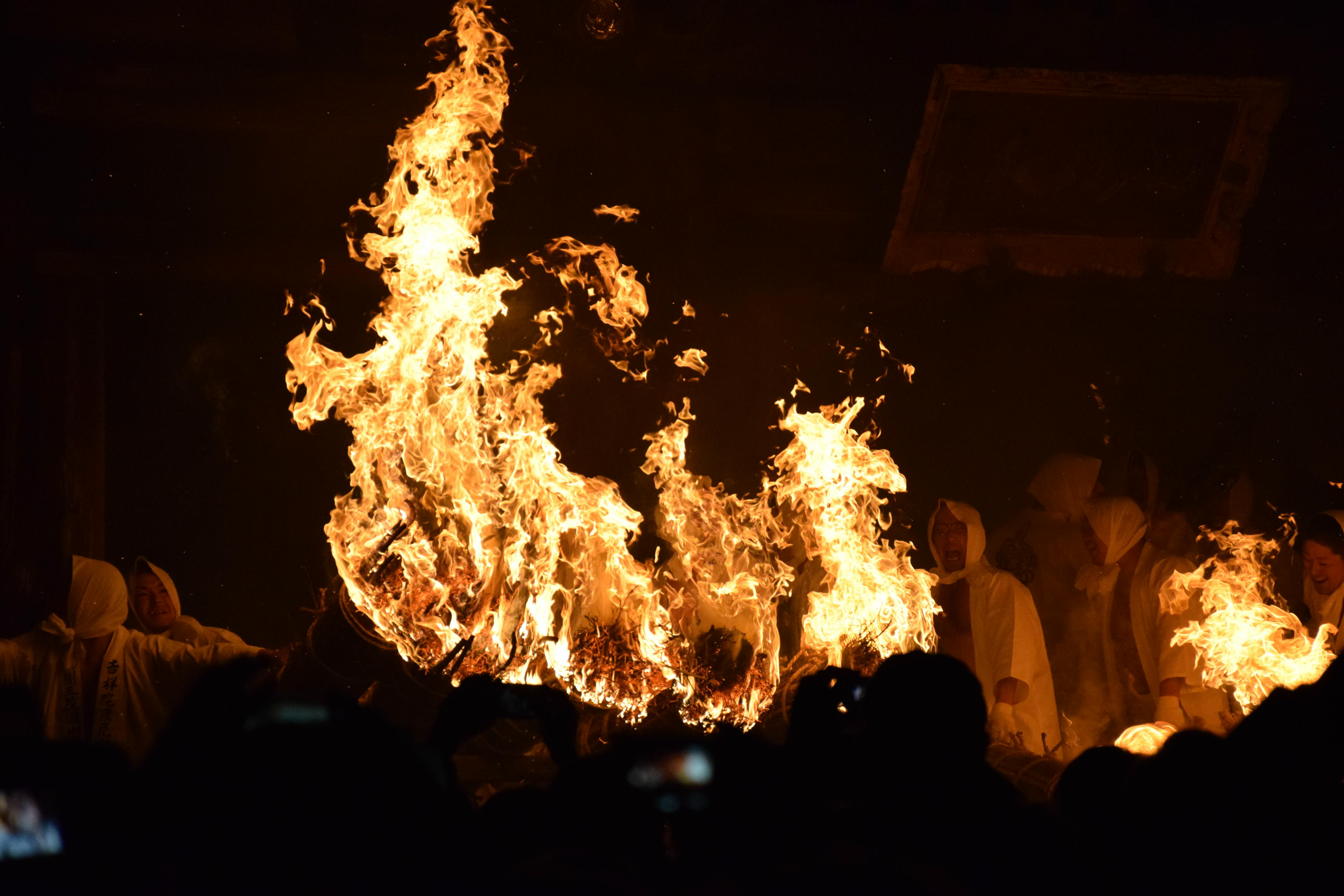
Oni Matsuri (Takisan-ji)

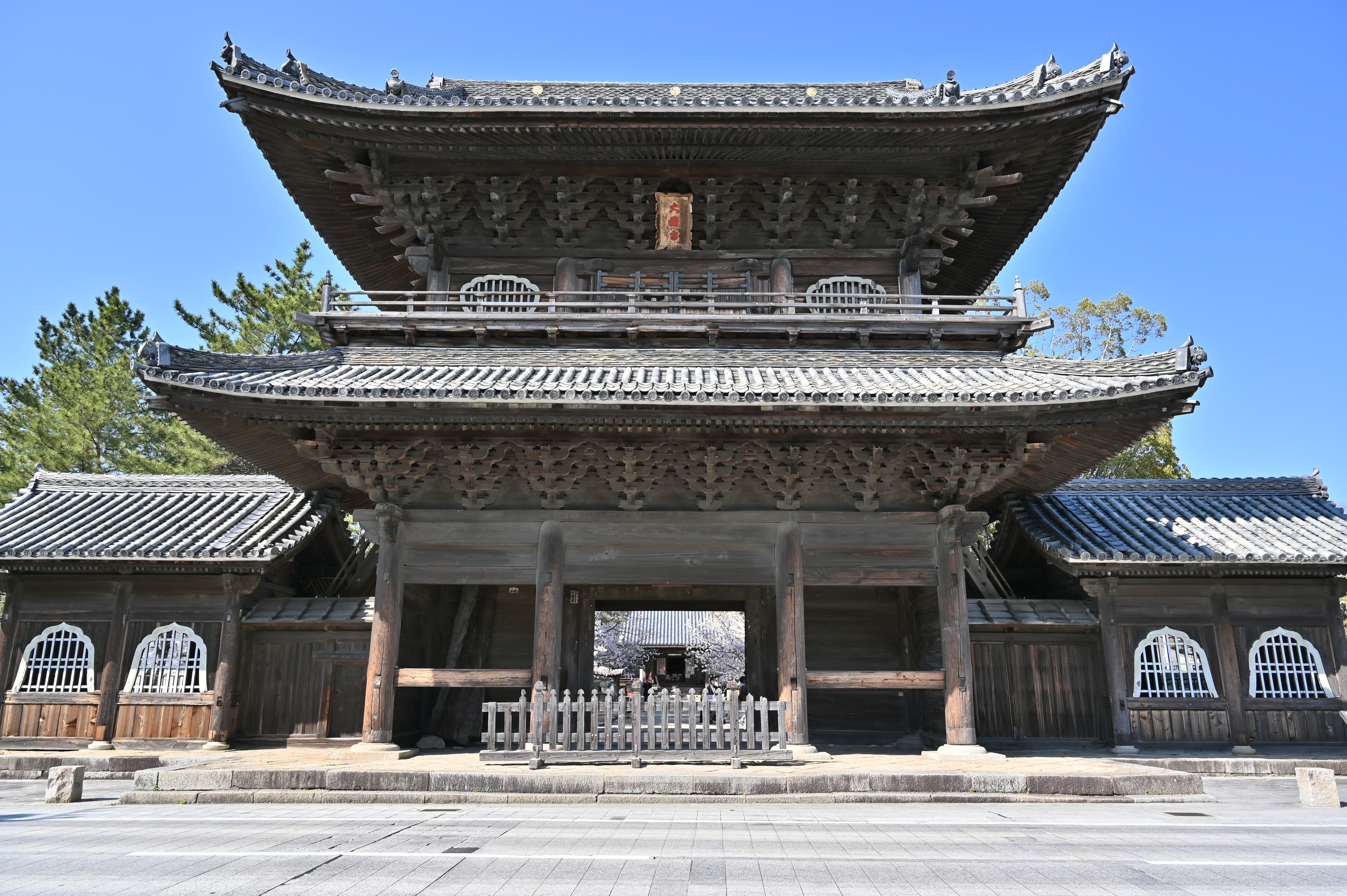
Daiju-ji

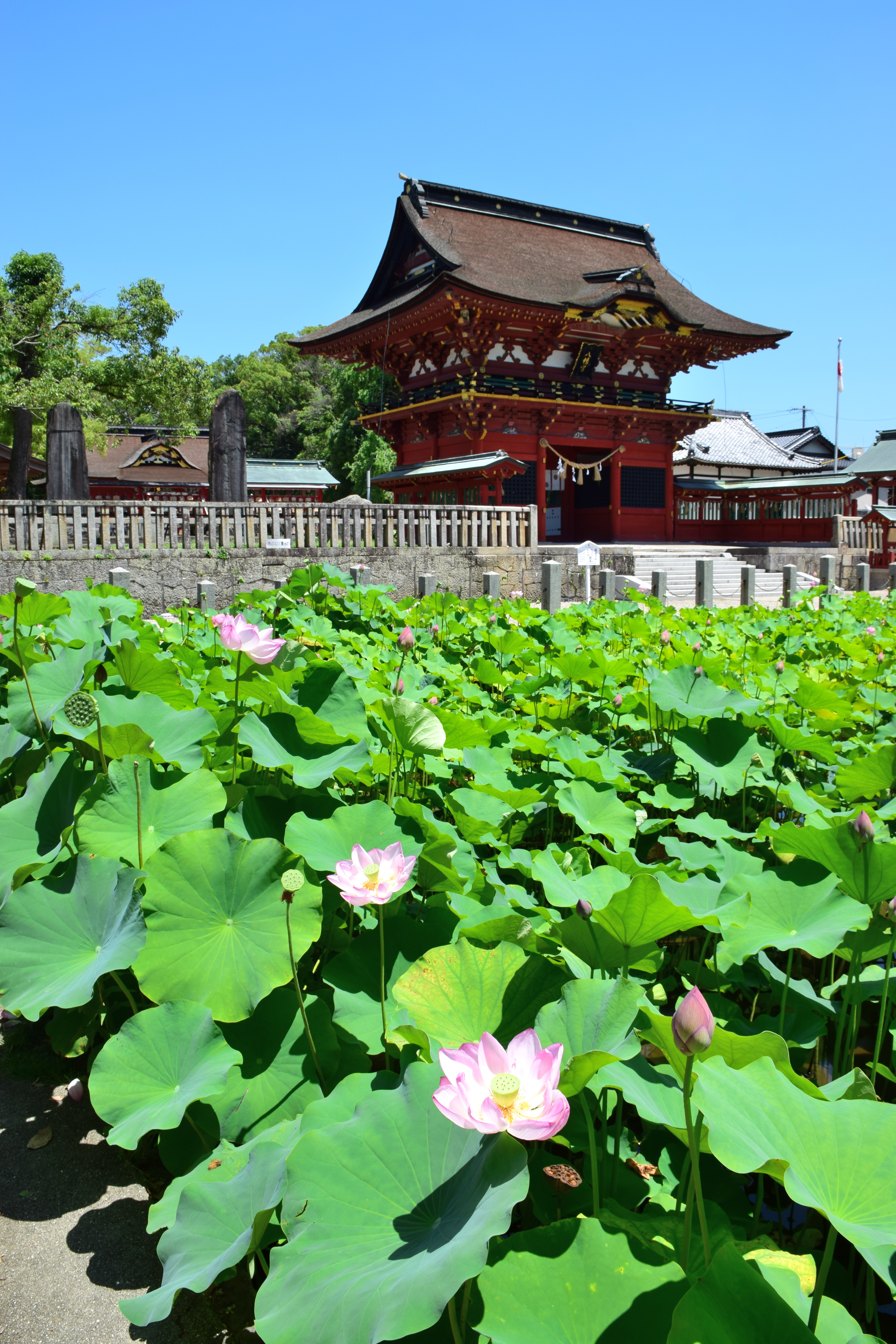
Iga-Hachimangū

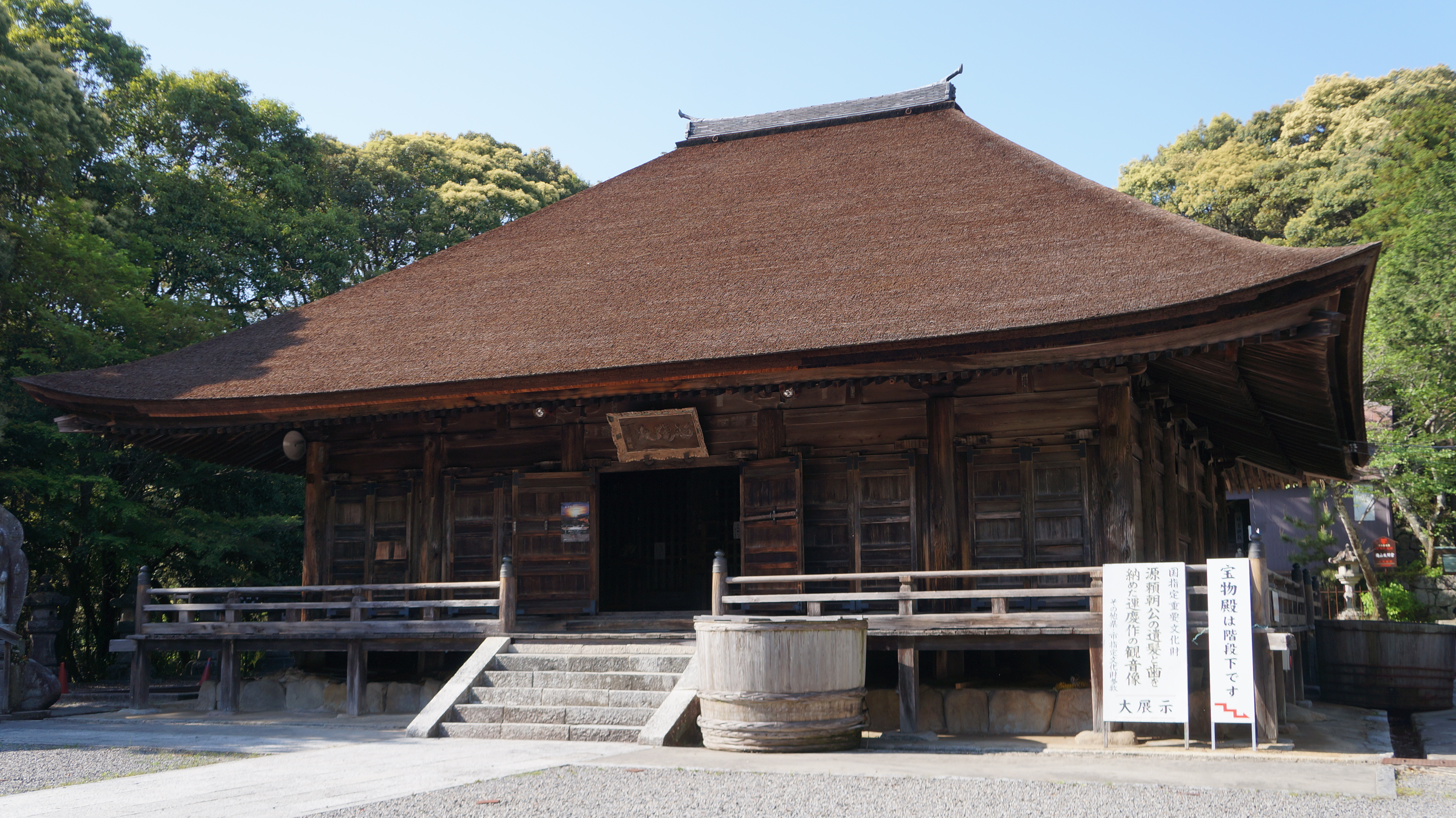
Takisan-ji

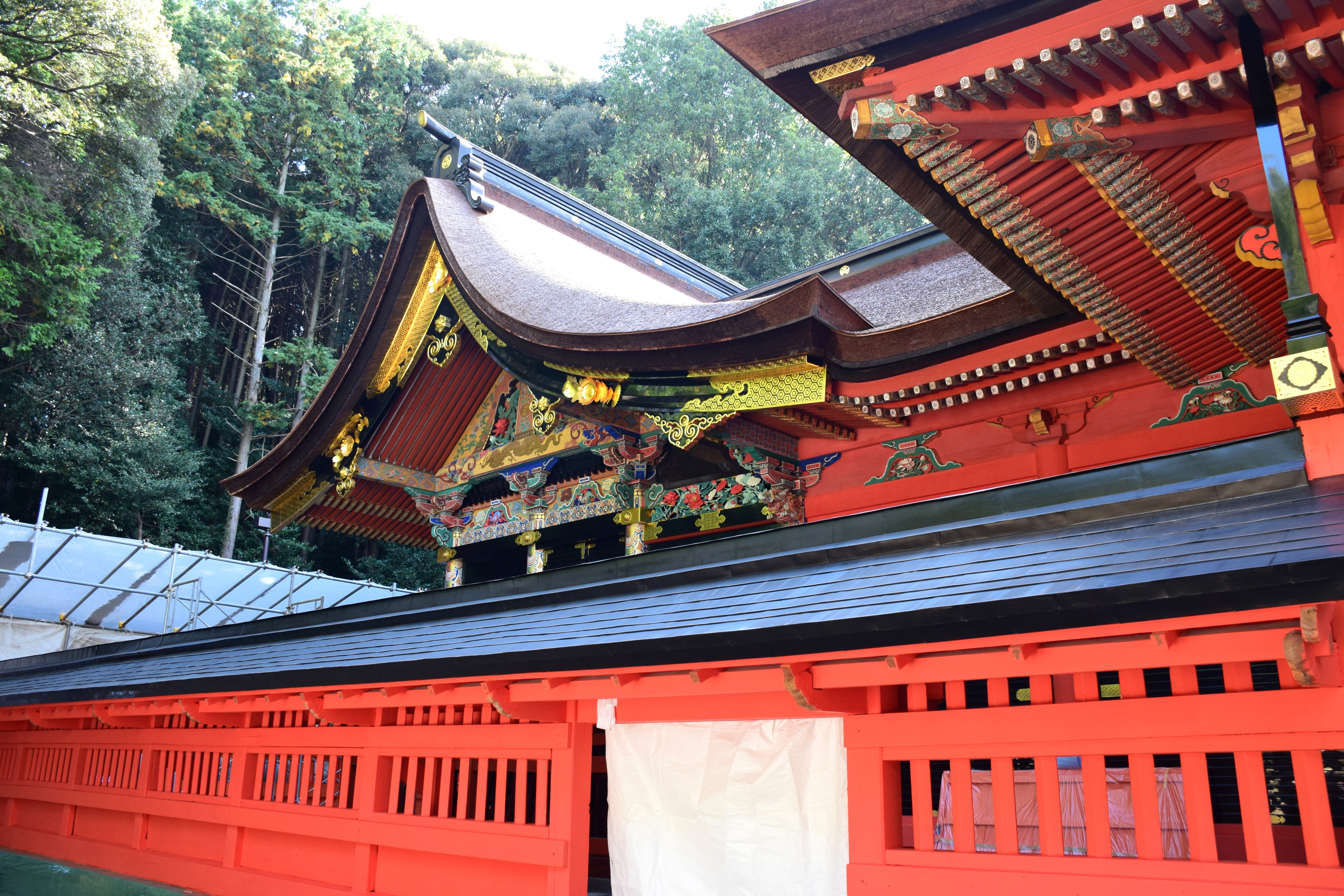
Rokusho-jinja

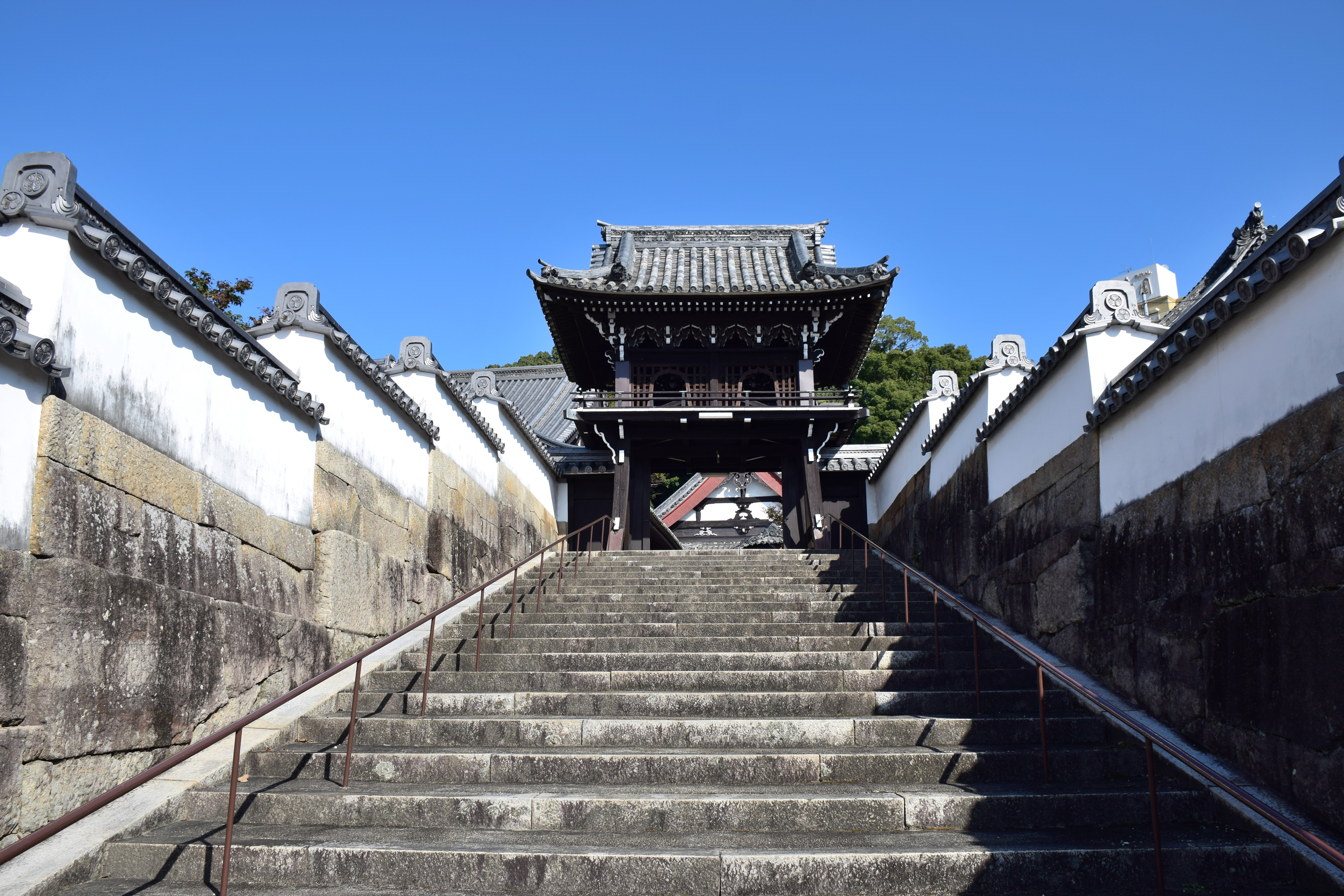
Zuinen-ji

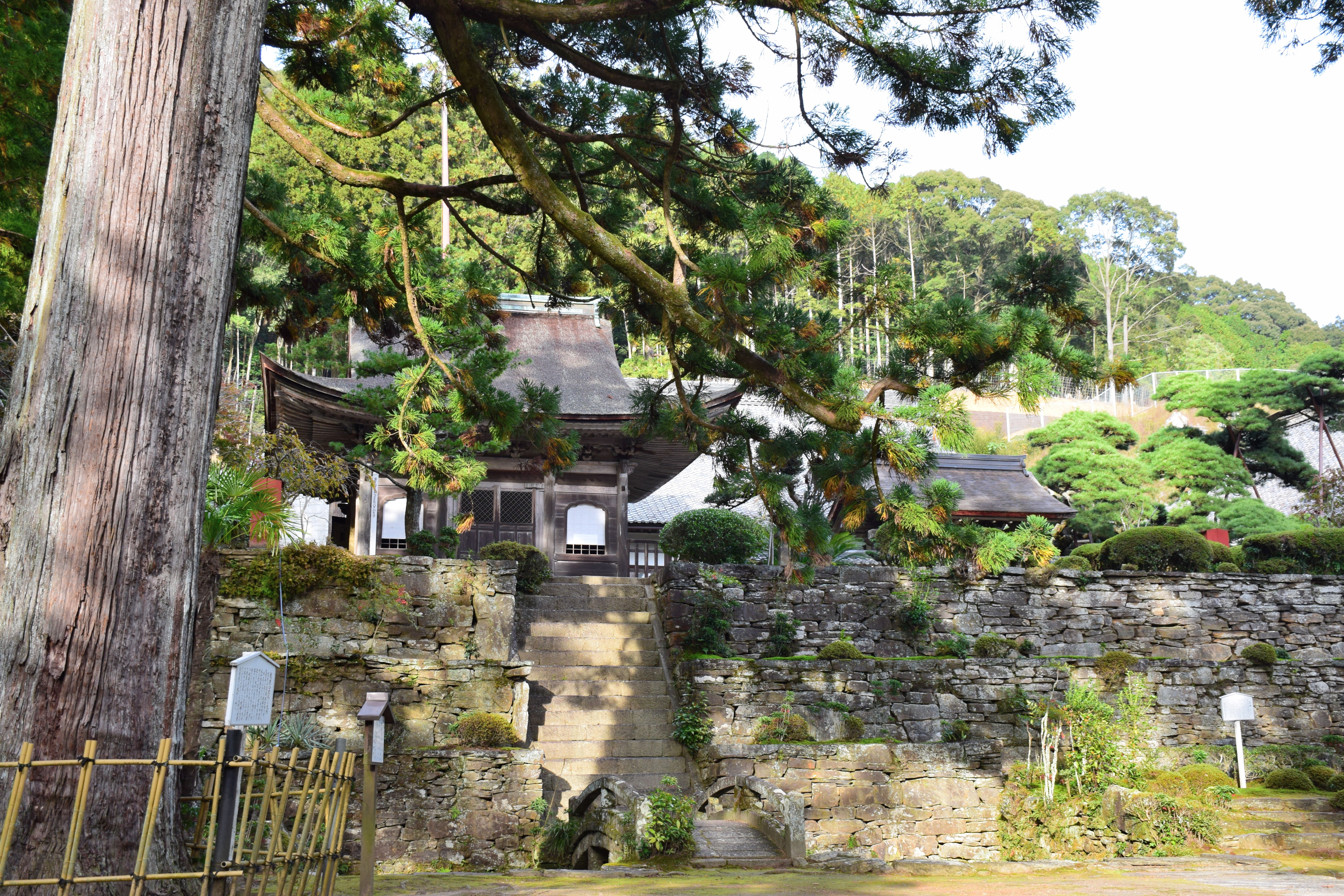
Ten'on-ji

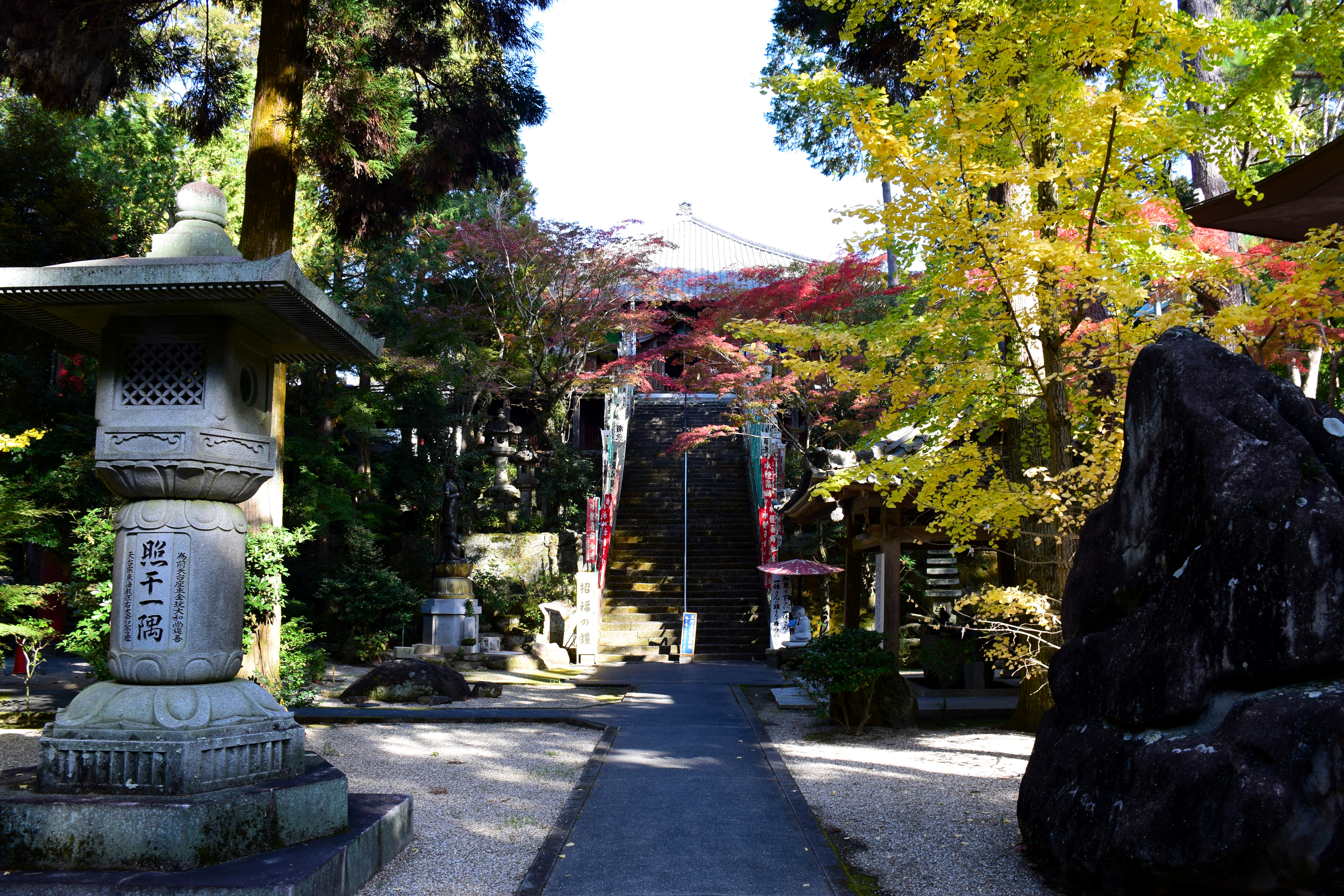
Shinpuku-ji

== Culture ==
=== Language ===
While the local Mikawa dialect is considered to be generally indistinguishable from what is considered modern standard Japanese, there are subtle and distinctive differences. Mikawa dialect has, on the other hand, substantial differences when compared to the dialect of Nagoya and western areas of Aichi, where the Nagoya dialect (also known as Owari-ben, Owari being the traditional name for the Nagoya region) is the traditional dialect. Cognitively Mikawa-ben and modern contemporary Japanese are extremely close, in part due to the influence of the Tokugawa shogunate and accidents of history. In recent decades a large number of people moving into Okazaki and the surrounding cities (particularly to work in the motor vehicle industry) and mass media have influenced the local dialect, with the result that in day-to-day life more people are using only standard Japanese.

== Notable people from Okazaki ==
- Takako Okamura, singer-songwriter
- Yuki Fukaya, professional men’s soccer player
- Naoko Fukazu, professional women's table tennis player
- Sei Hiraizumi, actor
- Kotaro Honda, scientist, metallurgist
- Yuko Kawai, pianist
- Motoo Kimura, biologist
- Takashi Kondō, voice actor
- Takeshi Nagata, geophysicist
- Immi, musician
- Kotomitsuki Keiji, sumo wrestler
- Ryo Miyaichi, professional men’s soccer player
- Daisuke Nakajima, race car driver
- Satoru Nakajima, race car driver
- Kazuki Nakajima, race car driver
- Masamitsu Naito, politician
- Hitoshi Ogawa, race car driver
- Takahiro Sakurai, voice actor
- Yasuo Segawa, illustrator
- Shiga Shigetaka, geographer
- Seiken Sugiura, politician
- Nozomi Takeuchi, gravure idol
- Yumiko Tsuzuki, professional women's volleyball player
- Hiromasa Yamamoto, professional men’s soccer player
- Yūki Ishikawa, professional men's volleyball player
- Yasunobu Okada, professor, National Institute for Physiological Sciences (NIPS).
