= The Graduate University for Advanced Studies =

Higher education institution in Kanagawa Prefecture, Japan

Coordinates: 35.2611°N 139.6084°E

The Graduate University for Advanced Studies, SOKENDAI
- 総合研究大学院大学
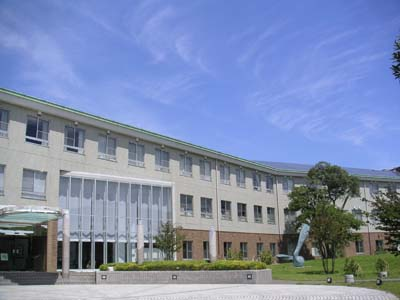
- Type: Public (National)
- Established: 1988; 38 years ago
- President: Mariko Hasegawa
- Academic staff: 1138 academic / 42 supports (As of May 1, 2020)
- Undergraduates: None
- Postgraduates: 543 (As of May 1, 2020)
- Location: Hayama, Kanagawa, Japan
- Language: Japanese, English
- Website: https://www.soken.ac.jp/en

The Graduate University for Advanced Studies, SOKENDAI (総合研究大学院大学, Sōgō kenkyū daigakuin daigaku) is one of the national universities of Japan, headquartered in Shonan Village in the town of Hayama in Kanagawa Prefecture. Sōkendai (総研大), as it is generally called in its abbreviated form, was established in 1988, with Dr. Saburo Nagakura as its president. SOKENDAI is the first national university in Japan having offered exclusively graduate programs. Graduate students are trained at affiliated research institutes distributed around Japan and the world. It has both five-year doctoral programs for students with a bachelor's degree and three-year programs for those with a master's degree.

== Objective ==
SOKENDAI is a National Graduate University of Japan, conforming to the guidelines stipulated under the provisions of Japan's National University Corporation Act. The National Graduate Universities' objective is to anticipate the future, nurture specialized researchers with broader visions, and contribute to the public benefit.

== Schools ==
SOKENDAI operates as a distributed research university that cooperates with research institutes throughout Japan. Administration and general courses are provided by SOKENDAI headquarters at the Hayama campus. Specialized courses and research activities are conducted at the host research institutes, including 16 research institutes working under four inter-university research institute corporations, the National Institute of Multimedia Education, and the Institute of Space and Astronautical Science. There are six schools, each offering specialization research programs in collaboration with the research institutes. The six schools include:

1. Cultural and Social Studies
2. Physical Sciences
3. High-Energy Accelerator Science
4. Multidisciplinary Sciences
5. Life Science
6. Advanced Sciences

== Rankings ==
The Graduate University for Advanced Studies, SOKENDAI has been ranked highly amongst global universities by the Center for World University Rankings (CWUR), placed 598th in the world (top 2.2%) in 2017. It has also been ranked highly amongst Japanese research universities by U.S. News & World Report, placed 16th in Japan in 2022 based on research strength indicators.

== Location ==
SOKENDAI main campus is located at Shonan-Kokusai-Mura(Shonan Village), Hayama Town, Miura District, Kanagawa Prefecture, 240-0193 Japan.

Each of its distributed schools campus is located at the host institutes:

- Hayama (Kanagawa Prefecture) - Research Center for Integrative Evolutionary Science, Graduate University for Advanced Studies head office
- Suita (Osaka Prefecture) - National Museum of Ethnology
- Katsurazaka(Kyoto City) (Kyoto Prefecture) - International Research Center for Japanese Studies
- Kamigamo(Kyoto City) (Kyoto Prefecture) - Research Institute for Humanity and Nature
- Toki (Gifu Prefecture) - National Institute for Fusion Science
- Okazaki (Aichi Prefecture) - Institute for Molecular Science, National Institute for Basic Biology, National Institute for Physiological Sciences
- Mishima (Shizuoka Prefecture) - National Institute of Genetics
- Sagamihara (Kanagawa Prefecture) - Institute of Space and Astronautical Science
- Tachikawa (Tokyo Metropolis) - National Institute of Japanese Literature, National Institute for Japanese Language and Linguistics, National Institute of Polar Research
- Mitaka (Tokyo Metropolis) - National Astronomical Observatory of Japan
- Chiyoda (Tokyo Metropolis) - National Institute of Informatics
- Sakura (Chiba Prefecture) - National Museum of Japanese History
- Tsukuba (Ibaraki Prefecture) - High Energy Accelerator Research Organization
- Tokai (Ibaraki Prefecture) - High Energy Accelerator Research Organization
- Mizusawa (Ōshū City) (Iwate Prefecture) - National Astronomical Observatory of Japan
- Nobeyama (Minamimaki Village) (Nagano Prefecture) - National Astronomical Observatory of Japan
- Hawaii (United States of America) - National Astronomical Observatory of Japan
- Atacama Desert (Republic of Chile) - National Astronomical Observatory of Japan
- Showa Station (Antarctica) - National Institute of Polar Research

== People ==
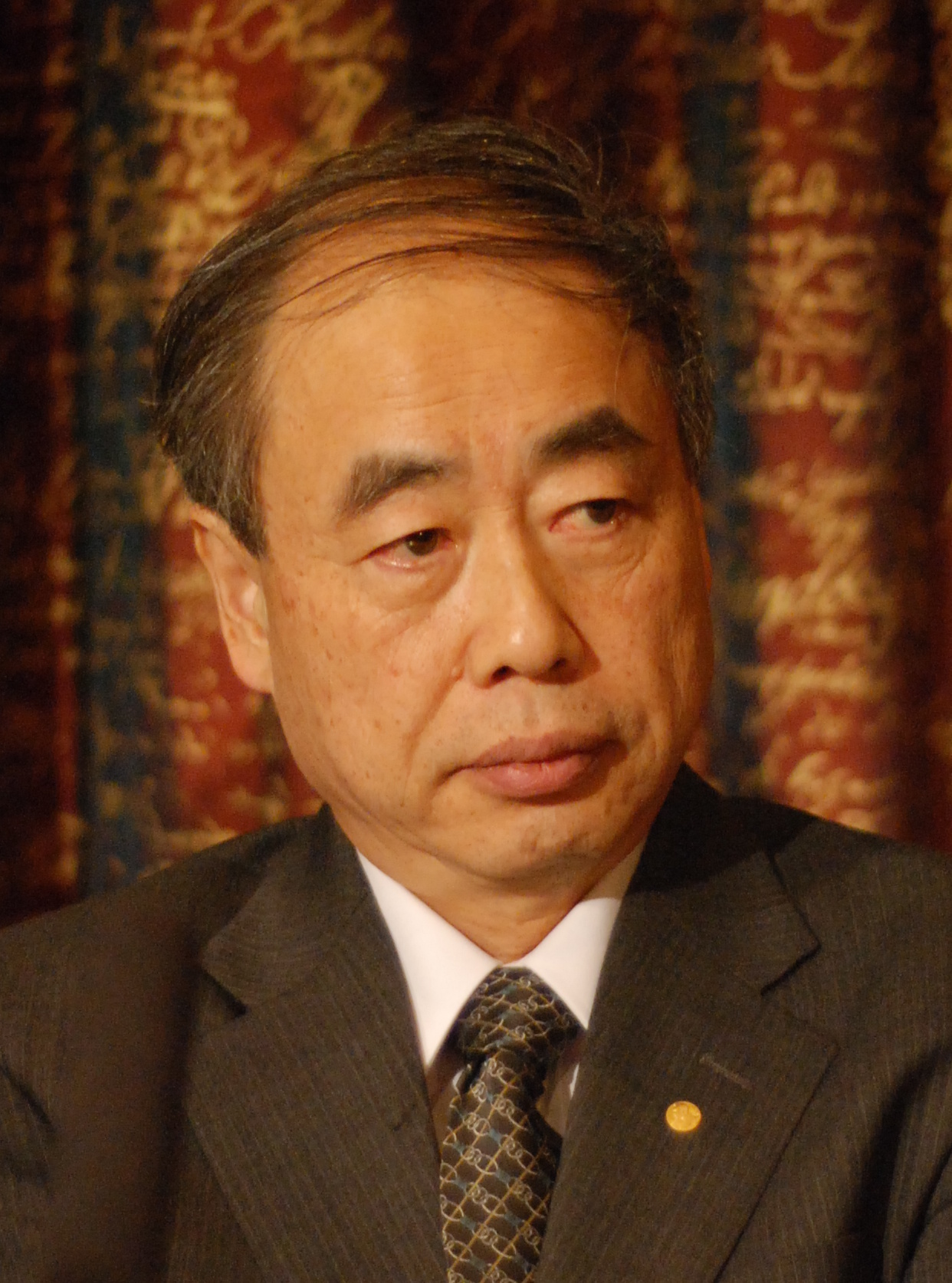
Makoto Kobayashi, professor emeritus, one of the 2008 Nobel Prize in Physics for CKM matrix.

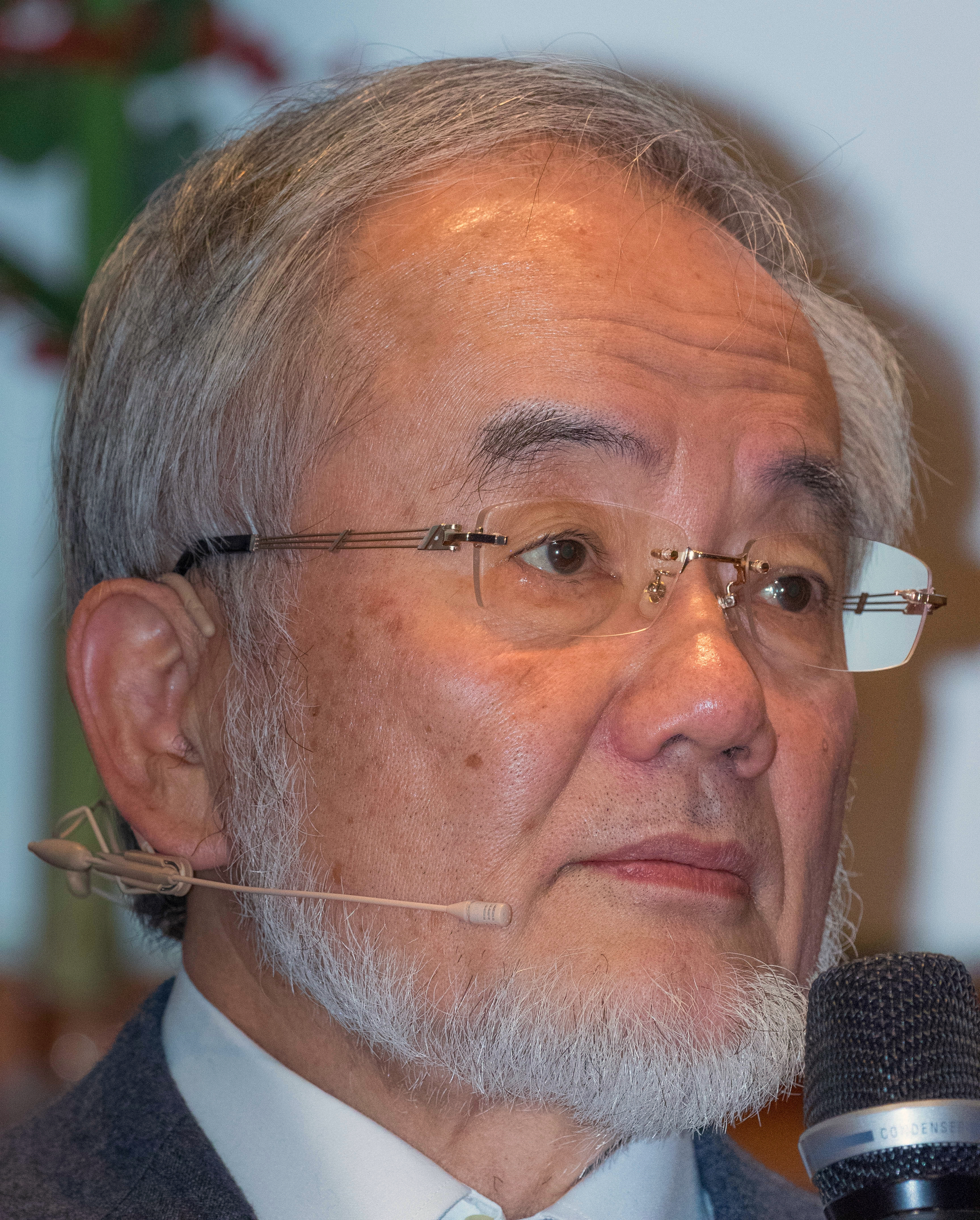
Yoshinori Ohsumi, professor emeritus, cell biologist, 2016 Nobel Prize in Physiology or Medicine winner.

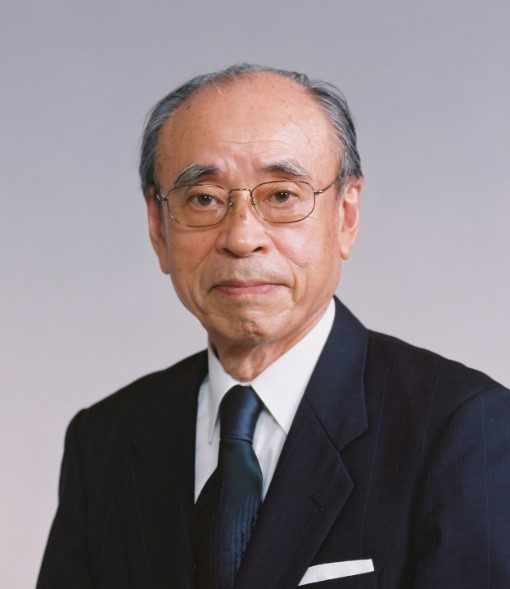
Yasuharu Suematsu, professor emeritus, pioneer of fiber-optic communication technology.
