= Ana Schurmann =

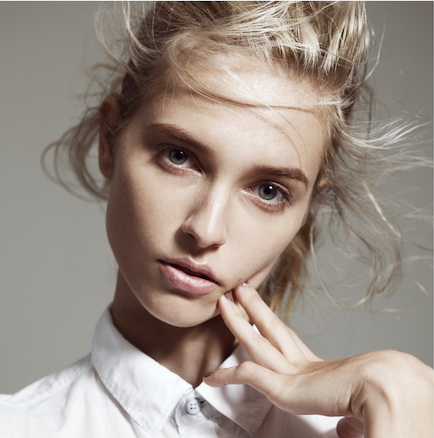
- Schurmann performing
- Born: Florianópolis, Brazil
- Occupations: Singer; composer; multi-instrumentalist; model; designer; researcher
- Years active: 2020–present
- Known for: Sonus Naturae; The Harmonic Universe; Neck Lyre
- Website: anaschurmann.com

Ana Schurmann is a Brazilian singer, composer, multi-instrumentalist, model, designer and researcher from Florianópolis. She gained international attention in 2020 when her song "Tell Me" was played on BBC Radio 1, composed the soundtrack for the Max Mara show at Milan Fashion Week in 2021, and was included in the Forbes 30 Under 30 Brazil list in 2023. Her research applies sonification to natural and astrophysical data; she has been described as the first composer to translate gravitational wave detections from the LIGO–Virgo–KAGRA collaboration into music.

== Early life and modelling ==
Schurmann has credited her grandfather, the writer and philosopher José Curi, with encouraging her studies and prompting her to begin composing. She began working as a model in her early teens.

Her modelling career spans more than 157 publications and covers, including Vogue and Harper's Bazaar, and work for designers including Dior and Calvin Klein. Her credits also include Cartier, Moncler, Max Mara and Osklen.

== Music ==
Schurmann's song "Tell Me", produced by Riccardo Onori, was first broadcast on BBC Radio 1 in September 2020 and was later added to the BBC playlist. In 2021 she composed the soundtrack for the Max Mara Spring/Summer 2022 show at Milan Fashion Week, at the invitation of creative director Ian Griffiths. In 2023 she was included in the Forbes 30 Under 30 Brazil list.

She plays several instruments, among them piano, guitar and violin, and designed an instrument of her own, the Neck Lyre. In May 2026 she performed at the centenary celebrations of the Hercílio Luz Bridge in Florianópolis. In August 2026 she released the single "Peacemakers", a self-produced track featuring the Neck Lyre.

=== Languages ===
Schurmann is a polyglot. Vogue reported that she speaks nine languages: Portuguese, English, Italian, French, Spanish, German, Chinese, Japanese and Hindi, and in 2021 a promotional video for "Tell Me" in which she spoke eight of them went viral. She began songwriting in English and has since written in several languages.

== Neck Lyre ==
In March 2026 Schurmann presented the Neck Lyre, a wearable multi-instrument made of gold and diamonds, described as a contemporary reinterpretation of the classical lyre. It took three years and several prototypes to develop, in collaboration with researchers in physics and biology. Worn around the neck, it combines string and percussion elements and is tuned to the Schumann resonance of 7.83 Hz, a range corresponding to alpha and theta brainwave frequencies, emitting vibrations patterned after heartbeat rhythms.

Clash described it as the world's first multi-instrument that doubles as scientific haute jewellery. Forbes Brasil reported that it was to be sold for R$400,000. The project is accompanied by the single "The Neck Lyre Haute Jewelry Instrument".

== Science and research ==
=== Sonus Naturae ===
Schurmann's research concerns the translation of natural forms and recordings into musical language. The project began after she observed that the markings on a seashell resembled a spectrogram. In collaboration with the researcher Roger Hale, she studies ways of transforming natural elements such as shell recordings, environmental noise and spectrograms into music; the work was published as Sonus Naturae 0. In 2022 she completed a 386-page study of geometric patterns in seashells.

=== The Harmonic Universe ===
In 2025 Schurmann developed a method for composing directly from gravitational wave detections, which she used to produce a musical series titled The Harmonic Universe (Chirp Symphony), also referred to as Sinfonia do Universo (Symphony of the Universe). Working from the open-access database of the LIGO–Virgo–KAGRA collaboration, she converted the strain-versus-time data of detected events into spectrograms and then, through sonification, into chords, applying harmonic field theory to complete the harmonisation and give the series its orchestral form. The work was developed in collaboration with scientists from the Instituto Tecnológico de Aeronáutica (ITA), who handled the analysis and processing of the astrophysical data. The piece was released on 11 November 2025 and performed at the XIX EFITA physics event at ITA.

=== Scientific Music ===
In September 2026 Schurmann described her method in an article for LIGO Magazine, the publication of the LIGO Scientific Collaboration. According to the article, The Harmonic Universe takes six detections of merging black holes or neutron stars from the LIGO–Virgo–KAGRA catalogue; the changing frequency of each signal's "chirp" is mapped directly to musical pitch, so that each event becomes a motif, and the motifs are ordered by the redshift of their sources, from the earliest event to the most recent, which also determines the harmony of the piece. She developed the methodology with the physicists Cassius de Melo and Regiley Pimenta of the Instituto Tecnológico de Aeronáutica, after discussions with the Virgo Brazil team.

Schurmann describes this work as part of a broader initiative she calls Scientific Music, which seeks reproducible methods for translating scientific data and natural phenomena into musical languages while preserving relationships present in the original data. Related projects include a collaboration with Kimberly Jameson of the University of California, Irvine on musical representations of tetrachromatic colour vision, work with the biologist Rosario Jacoby in Argentina on bird vocalisations, and work with astronomers Ana Clara Rocha and Thiago Flauzino Haber on stellar-evolution data. She has visited the Virgo interferometer at the European Gravitational Observatory near Pisa, and in 2026 The Harmonic Universe was performed at ITA and in São José dos Campos with a local orchestra and wind quintet.

== Design ==
=== The Transformation Dress ===
In November 2025 Schurmann released The Transformation Dress, a convertible garment that can be worn as a hat, a bag, a skirt, a dress or a trench coat. It consists of a tube dress with three possible lengths and two detachable skirts, made from a sustainable cotton fustian produced from textile offcuts. The design originated two years earlier in a sketch for a handbag, and the prototype was hand-stitched by Schurmann with the atelier partner Cristina Mura.

=== Umbrella Dress ===
Schurmann also designed the Umbrella Dress, a convertible dress-and-parasol system.

== Art ==
Schurmann paints animal subjects in acrylic. In 2022 she launched Ana Schurmann Art, a series of T-shirts printed from her paintings, with proceeds directed to organisations supporting endangered species.
