= Toshiaki Enoki =

Japanese physical chemist

Toshiaki Enoki (Japanese: 榎 敏明; born December 4, 1946) is a Japanese physical chemist. After earning his Ph.D. from Kyoto University, he was appointed as a research associate at the Institute for Molecular Science in 1977. His early research focused on the electronic and magnetic properties of organic conductors and graphite intercalation compounds, with particular emphasis on hydrogen adsorption into graphitic galleries. In 1987, he joined the Tokyo Institute of Technology (now the Institute of Science Tokyo) as an associate professor and was promoted to full professor in 1991. During this period, his research interests shifted toward graphene - a single atomic layer of graphite and related carbon-based materials, particularly nanosized graphene, or nanographene. Enoki’s primary focus became the unique geometrical dependence of nanographene sheets in determining their electronic and magnetic properties. In 1996, M. Fujita theoretically predicted the existence of a localized nonbonding state - known as an edge state at the carbon atoms along the zigzag edges of a graphene sheet. Enoki later confirmed the presence of this edge state experimentally using scanning tunneling microscopy, He has contributed to understanding of the electronic, magnetic, and chemical properties of nanographene and related carbon-based materials.

== Academic career ==
- 1969: BS, Kyoto University
- 1974: PhD, Kyoto University
- 1977: Research Associate, Institute for Molecular Science
- 1984: Visiting Scientist, Massachusetts Institute of Technology
- 1987: Associate Professor, Tokyo Institute of Technology
- 1991: Professor, Tokyo Institute of Technology
- 2000, 2002 - 2004：Visiting Professor, Universite de Rennes I
- 2003-2004: Visiting Professor, Institute for Molecular Science
- 2010-2013: Honorary Professor, Durham University
- 2012 : Professor Emeritus, Tokyo Institute of Technology
- 2012-2022: Program Officer, Japan Science and Technology Agency
- 2016-2018: Visiting Fellow, Toyota Physical and Chemical Research Institute

== Honors and awards ==
- 2004: The Carbon Society of Japan Award
- 2005: Honorary Member (H145), Materials Research Society of India
- 2008: The Commendation for Science and Technology by the Minister of Education, Culture, Sports, Science and Technology, Japan
- 2009: The Award by the Japan Society for Molecular Science (1 st)
- 2011: The Chemical Society of Japan Award "Edge state of Nanographene and its Electronic and Magnetic Properties"
- 2013: Honorary Member, Ioffe Physical Technical Institute, Russian Academy of Sciences
- 2015: Prof. C. N. R. Rao Award Lecture, Chemical Research Society of India
- 2016: Mizushima-Raman Lecture, Chemical Research Society of India
- 2016: Rudolf Zahradník Honorary Lecture Award, Palacky University, the Czech Republic
- 2020: Honorary Member, the Japan Society for Molecular Science
