= TAMA 300 =

Gravitational wave detector

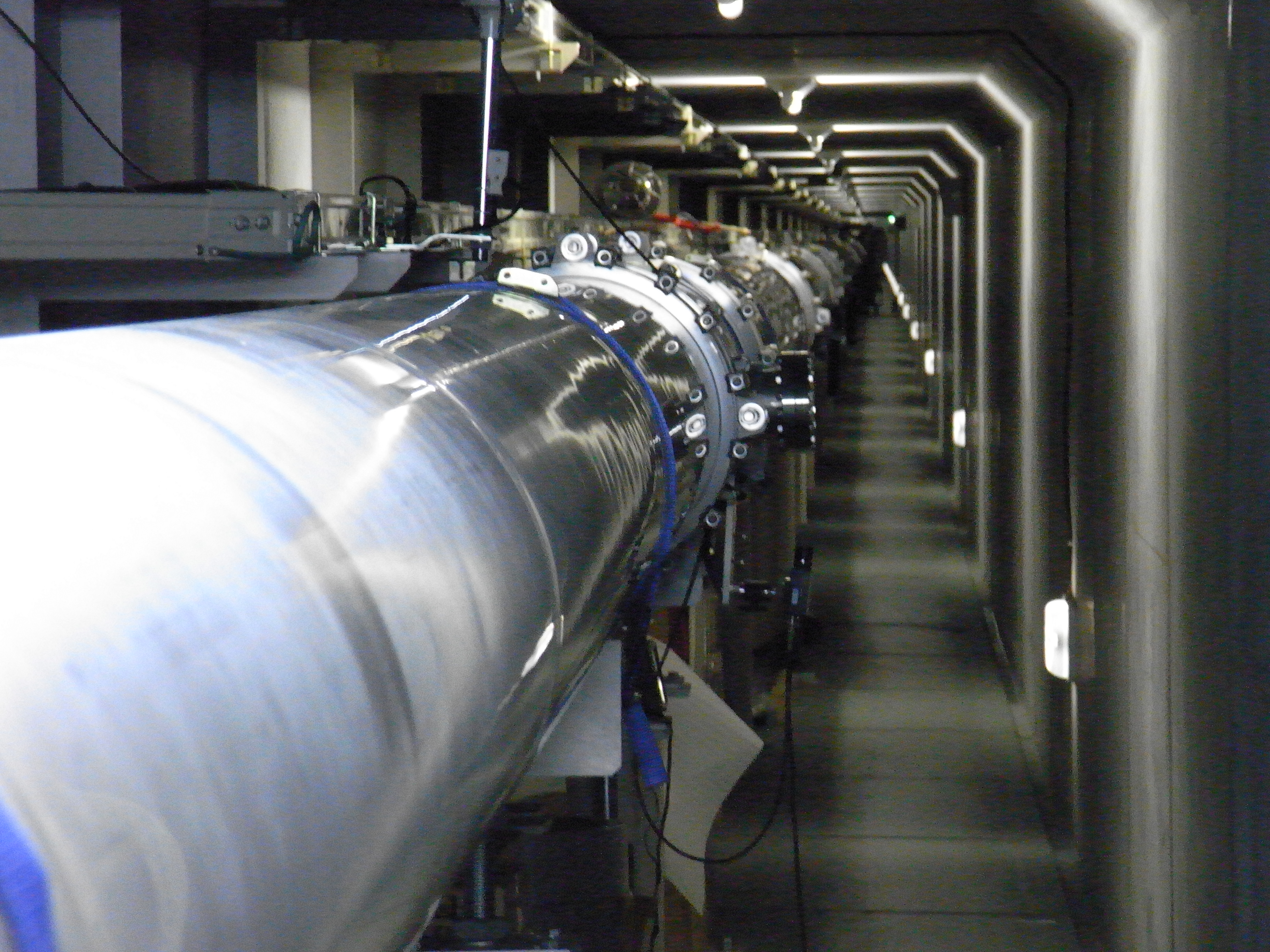
- Location(s): NAOJ Mitaka Campus, Ōsawa, Mitaka, Tokyo, Japan
- Coordinates: 35°40′36″N 139°32′10″E
- Website: tamago.mtk.nao.ac.jp/spacetime/tama300_e.html,%20http://tamago.mtk.nao.ac.jp/spacetime/tama300_j.html
- Location of TAMA 300
- Related media on Commons

TAMA 300 is a gravitational wave detector located at the Mitaka campus of the National Astronomical Observatory of Japan. It is a project of the gravitational wave studies group at the Institute for Cosmic Ray Research (ICRR) of the University of Tokyo. The ICRR was established in 1976 for cosmic ray studies, and is currently developing the Kamioka Gravitational Wave Detector (KAGRA).

TAMA 300 was preceded in Mitaka by a 20m prototype TAMA 20 in years 1991–1994. Later the prototype was moved underground to Kamioka mine and renamed LISM. It operated 2000-2002 and established seismic quietness of the underground location.

Construction of the TAMA project started in 1995. Data were collected from 1999 to 2004. It adopted a Fabry–Pérot Michelson interferometer (FPMI) with power recycling. It is officially known as the 300m Laser Interferometer Gravitational Wave Antenna due to having 300 meter long (optical) arms.

The goal of the project was to develop advanced techniques needed for a future kilometer sized interferometer and to detect gravitational waves that may occur by chance within the Local Group.

Observation of TAMA has been terminated, and work moved to the 100 m Cryogenic Laser Interferometer Observatory (CLIO) prototype in Kamioka mine.

As of 2020, modified TAMA 300 is used as a testbed to develop new technologies.

== See also ==
- CLIO, a prototype interferometric gravitational wave detector operating in Japan.
- KAGRA, a state-of-the-art interferometric gravitational wave detector under development in Japan
