= National Institute for Basic Biology, Japan =

Research institute in Okazaki, Japan

Coordinates: 34°56′59″N 137°09′55″E

National Institute for Basic Biology
- Established: 1977
- Director-General: Kiyotaka OKADA, D. Sci.
- Staff: 305
- Budget: 3,062 million yen in total
- Address: 38 Nishigonaka, Myodaiji, Okazaki, Aichi 444-8585 Japan
- Location: Okazaki City, Aichi Prefecture, Japan
- Website: http://www.nibb.ac.jp/en

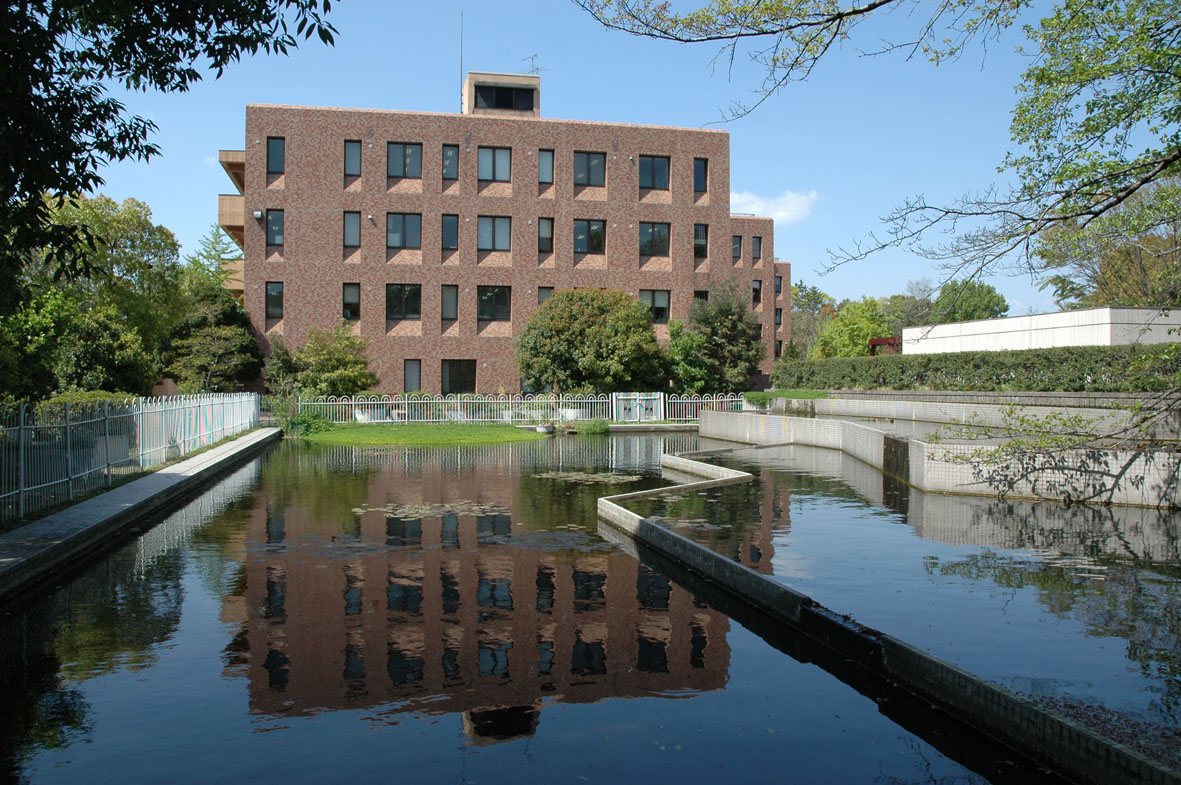
NIBB Myodaiji campus

The National Institute for Basic Biology (基礎生物学研究所, kisoseibutsugaku kenkyuujo) (NIBB) is a research institute and post graduate university in Okazaki City, Aichi Prefecture, Japan. It was founded in 1977 to promote biological research in Japan in cooperation with public and private universities, and research institutes.

== Research ==
Though the institute's primary focus is basic biology, research there covers a wide variety of biological fields, such as cell biology, developmental biology, neurobiology, evolutionary biology, environmental biology, and theoretical biology. The results of the research conducted at NIBB are regularly published in peer-reviewed publications such as Science, Nature, and the Proceedings of the National Academy of Sciences.

== Education ==
In addition to being a research institute, NIBB also functions as an institution of higher education. As such, it constitutes the Department of Basic Biology in the School of Life Science of the Graduate University for Advanced Studies (SOKENDAI). The department offers a five-year Doctoral program for university graduates and a three-year senior Doctoral course for students who have already completed a Master's course.

Graduate students enrolled in other universities and institutions are also eligible to conduct research there for fixed periods of time under the supervision of NIBB professors.

== International cooperation ==
The institute acts as a gateway between the international scientific community and researchers in Japan through various conferences, seminars, and hands-on practical courses.

=== International conferences ===
==== NIBB Conference ====
The institute has hosted the NIBB Conference every year since the opening of the Institute in 1977. The purpose of the conference is to provide active researchers with the opportunity to freely discuss current issues in various areas of biological research.

==== Okazaki Biology Conference ====
The Okazaki Biology Conference (OBC) initiated in 2003, has as its objective the establishment of interdisciplinary networks in the pursuit of answers to major questions in biology.

=== Academic exchange ===
NIBB performs academic exchange programs with the European Molecular Biology Laboratory (EMBL) and the National Institutes of Natural Sciences (NINS). This includes: promotion of joint research activities; invitation of faculty members and researchers to lectures, workshops, conferences, symposia, and other academic activities; exchange of graduate students for conferences and training courses; and the exchange of information and academic publications

It has also joined with the Max Planck Institute for Plant Breeding of the Max Planck Society (MPIZ) in an initiative aimed at stimulating academic and scholarly exchange. The two will plan and promote joint research projects, collaborative symposia, training courses and student exchange programs.

=== National BioResource Project ===
Medaka provided by NIBB

The National BioResource Project (NBRP) is a national project for the systematic accumulation, storage, and supply of bioresources (experimental animals and plants, cells, DNA, and other genetic resources) widely used as tools in life science research. To The institute participates in this as a research and supply center for medaka (Oryzia latipes), a small, egg-laying freshwater teleost fish found in brooks and rice paddies, whose usefulness as a vertebrate model first developed in Japan, and whose full genome sequence became available in 2007. The medaka supplied by NIBB include standard strains, wild stocks, inbred strains, related species and spontaneous and induced mutants. NIBB is also a subcenter for NBPR's work with Japanese morning glory and zebrafish.

In addition, NIBB provides databases in English containing research data on the moss physcomitrella patens, daphnia, xenopus laevis, plant cell organelles, and bacterial genomes to researchers worldwide.

== Organization ==
The Director-General oversees the operation of NIBB, assisted by an Advisory Committee for Programming and Management, composed of an equal number of professors within NIBB and of leading biologists outside NIBB.

== NINS ==
In 2004, NIBB, in alliance with four other national institutes – the National Astronomical Observatory of Japan, the National Institute for Fusion Science, the National Institute for Physiological Sciences, and the Institute for Molecular Science – established the National Institutes of Natural Sciences, Japan (NINS) to promote collaboration among researchers of the five constituent institutes.

== See also ==
- National Institutes of Natural Sciences, Japan
- Max Planck Society
- European Molecular Biology Laboratory
