= Nano-JASMINE =

NAOJ satellite

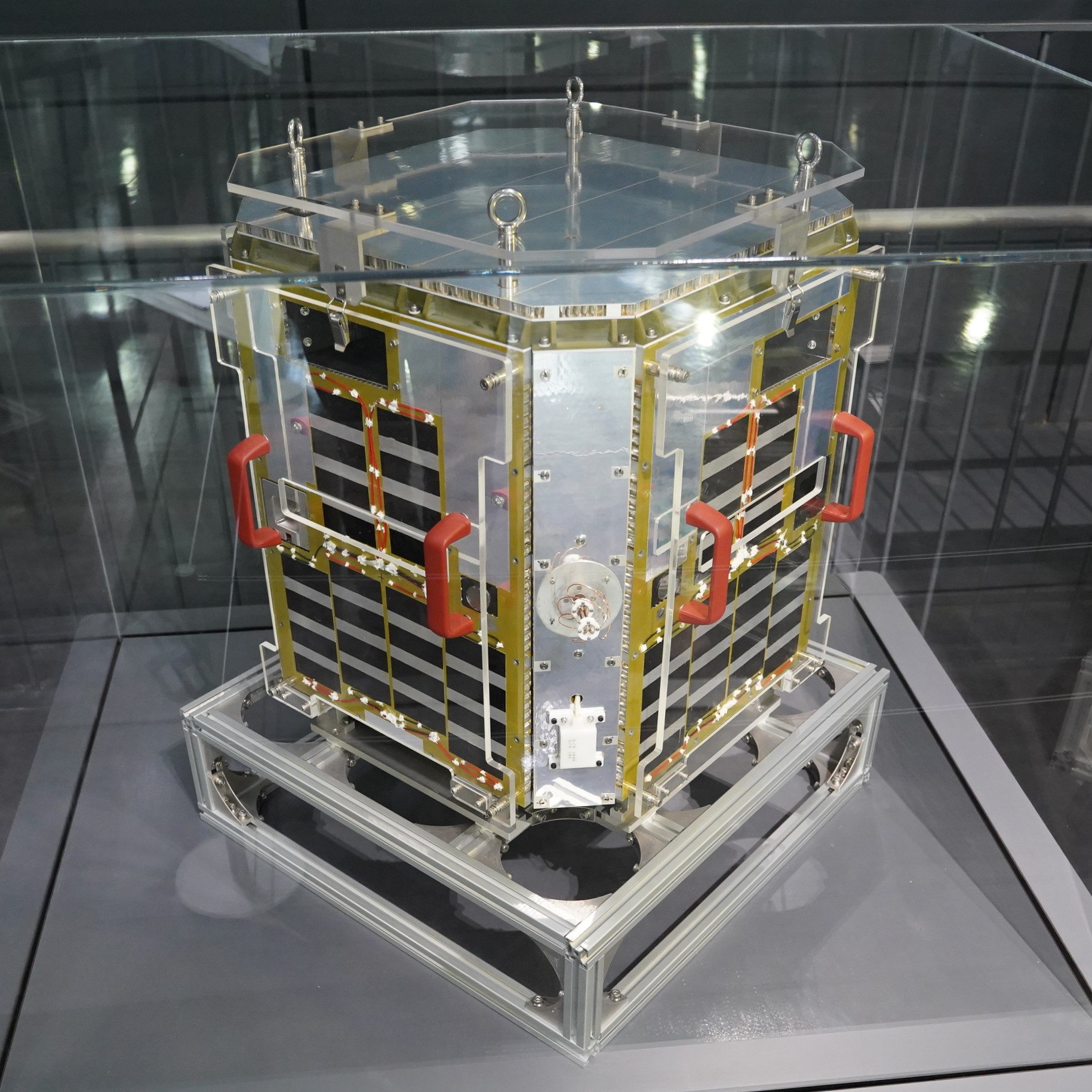
- Names: Nano-Japan Astrometry Satellite Mission for Infrared Exploration
- Mission type: Astrometric observatory
- Operator: National Astronomical Observatory of Japan
- Mission duration: 2 years (planned)

Spacecraft properties
- Manufacturer: University of Tokyo, Intelligent Space Systems Laboratory (ISSL)
- Launch mass: 35 kg (77 lb)
- Dimensions: 50.8 × 50.8 × 51.2 cm (20.0 × 20.0 × 20.2 in)
- Power: 20 watts

Start of mission
- Launch date: Cancelled

Orbital parameters
- Reference system: Geocentric orbit
- Regime: Sun-synchronous orbit
- Perigee altitude: 800 km (500 mi)
- Apogee altitude: 800 km (500 mi)

Main telescope
- Type: Ritchey–Chrétien telescope
- Diameter: 5.25 cm (2.07 in)
- Focal length: 167 cm (66 in)
- Wavelengths: 600–1000 nm

The Nano-Japan Astrometry Satellite Mission for Infrared Exploration (Nano-JASMINE) is an astrometric microsatellite developed by the National Astronomical Observatory of Japan, with contributions by the University of Tokyo's Intelligent Space Systems Laboratory (ISSL). As of 2015, the satellite was planned for launch together with CHEOPS (Characterizing Exoplanets Satellite) in 2019. However, this launch took place in December 2019 without Nano-JASMINE as one of the three piggyback payloads. Some sources named 2022 as the launch year of the satellite. By 2023, the launch had been cancelled and the satellite is now displayed in Kakamigahara Air and Space Museum. With the cancellation of the Nano-JASMINE demonstration mission, the focus shifted to its successor: the larger JASMINE (Japan Astrometry Satellite Mission for Infrared Exploration). As of December 2024, JASMINE is scheduled for a launch at the end of the 2031 fiscal year.

== Spacecraft ==
Nano-JASMINE is a microsatellite measuring 50.8 × 50.8 × 51.2 cm (20.0 × 20.0 × 20.2 in) and weighing approximately 35 kg (77 lb). It carries a small, 5.25 cm (2.07 in) Ritchey–Chrétien telescope that will make observations in the infrared spectrum, allowing for easier observation toward the centre of the Milky Way. Its exterior is covered with Gallium arsenide (GaAs) solar cells providing approximately 20 watts of power. Due to limited bandwidth, Nano-JASMINE will employ a Star Image Extractor (SIE) for onboard raw image processing that will extract and transmit only specific object data.

== Overview ==
Nano-JASMINE is Japan's first and the world's third astrometric survey spacecraft, following Hipparcos (1989) and Gaia (2013), both launched by the European Space Agency (ESA). It is the pathfinder in a planned series of three spacecraft of increasing size and capability; The second is (originally and officially still called "Small-JASMINE") with a 30 cm (12 in) telescope, and the third is JASMINE with an 80 cm (31 in) telescope.

The spacecraft is designed to have an astrometric accuracy (2–3 mas (milli-arcseconds) for stars brighter than 7.5 magnitude) comparable to Hipparcos (1 mas). Nano-JASMINE should be able to detect approximately four times the number of stars as Hipparcos. Given the time difference between these missions, combining the data sets of Nano-JASMINE and Hipparcos will constrain the positions of stars whose current positions are poorly known owing to uncertainty in their motion since being measured by Hipparcos, and should provide an order-of-magnitude increase in the accuracy of proper motion measurements (approximately 0.1 mas/year; 0.2 mas/year for stars brighter than 9 magnitude).

Nano-JASMINE had been scheduled for launch aboard a Tsyklon-4 launch vehicle from the Brazilian Space Agency's Alcântara Launch Center (CLA). The launch was originally contracted for August 2011, but was delayed to the November 2013 to March 2014 time frame. Various issues have held back its launch, first due to delays in both the construction of the launch site and development of the launch vehicle, and later due to Brazil backing out of the Tsyklon-4 partnership with Ukraine leading to the rocket's indefinite hold. In March 2015, talks to arrange a flight for Nano-JASMINE began between NAOJ and ESA. It was to be launched as a piggyback payload with CHEOPS on a Soyuz launch vehicle in 2019. As of late 2020, the launch of Nano-JASMINE was scheduled for 2022. In 2023, the launch was cancelled and the satellite was put on permanent display.

Nano-JASMINE will be succeeded by a larger spacecraft, JASMINE (formerly "Small-JASMINE"), which is planned to be launched in 2031 on an Epsilon S launch vehicle.
