= Subaru Telescope =

Japanese telescope and observatory

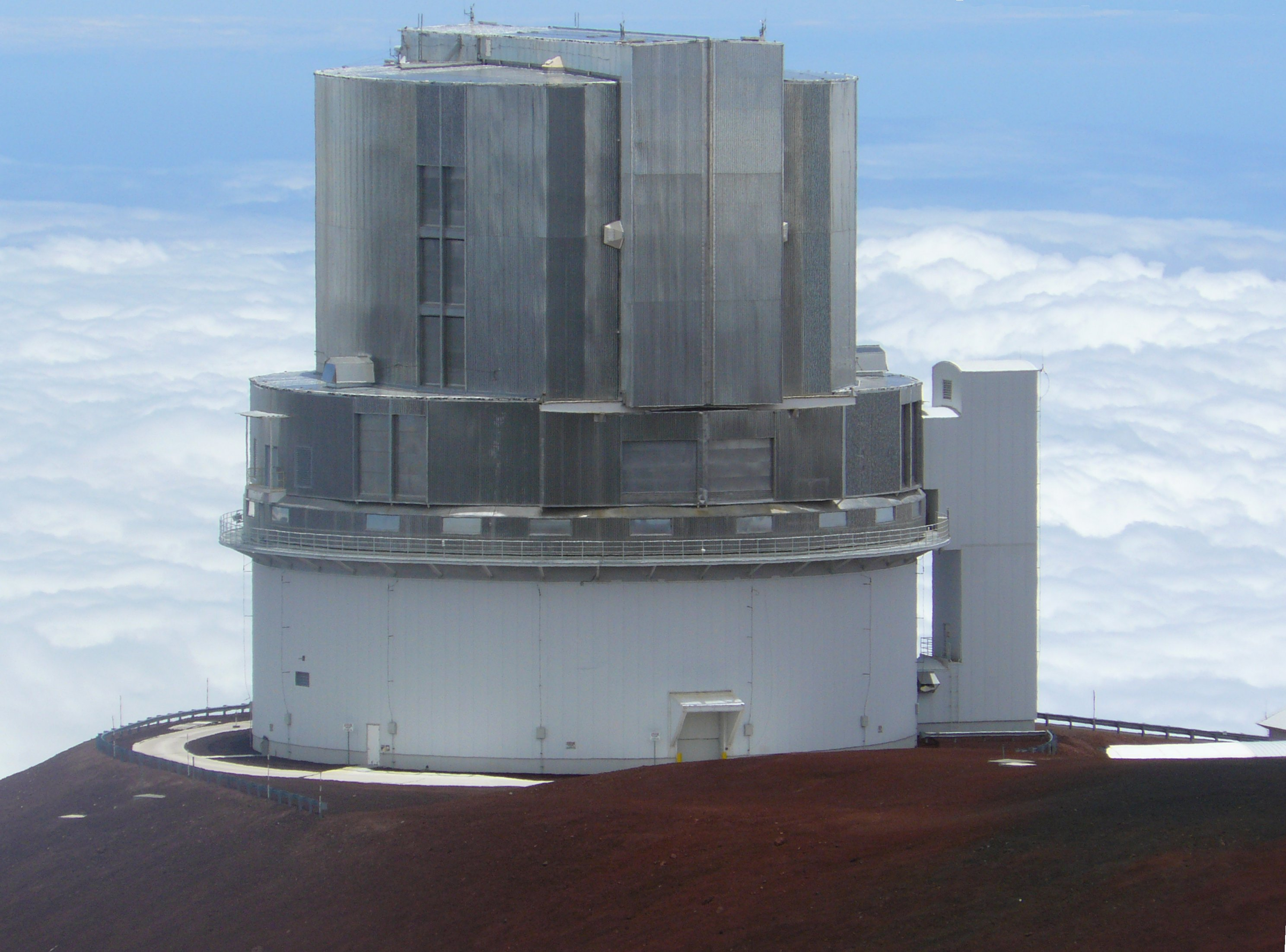
- The Subaru Telescope
- Location: United States
- Coordinates: 19°49′32″N 155°28′34″W
- Observatory code: T09
- Altitude: 4,139 m (13,579 ft)
- Wavelength: Optical/Infrared
- Built: Completed 1998
- Diameter: 8.3 m (8.2 m usable)
- Secondary diameter: 1330/1400/1265 mm
- Angular resolution: 0.23″
- Collecting area: 53 m^{2} (570 sq ft)
- Focal length: f/1.83 (15.000 m)
- Mounting: Altitude/Azimuth
- Website: www.naoj.org/,%20https://subarutelescope.org//jp/
- Location within Hawaii
- Related media on Commons

Subaru Telescope (すばる望遠鏡, Subaru Bōenkyō) is the 8.2-metre (320 in) telescope of the National Astronomical Observatory of Japan, located at the Mauna Kea Observatory on Hawaii. It is named after the open star cluster known in English as the Pleiades. It had the largest monolithic primary mirror in the world from its commissioning until the Large Binocular Telescope opened in 2005.

== Overview ==
The Subaru Telescope is a Ritchey-Chretien reflecting telescope. Instruments can be mounted at a Cassegrain focus below the primary mirror; at either of two Nasmyth focal points in enclosures on the sides of the telescope mount, to which light can be directed with a tertiary mirror; or at the prime focus in lieu of a secondary mirror, an arrangement rare on large telescopes, to provide a wide field of view suited to deep wide-field surveys.

In 1984, the University of Tokyo formed an engineering working group to develop and study the concept of a 7.5-metre (300 in) telescope. In 1985, the astronomy committee of Japan's science council gave top priority to the development of a "Japan National Large Telescope" (JNLT), and in 1986, the University of Tokyo signed an agreement with the University of Hawaiʻi to build the telescope in Hawaii. In 1988, the National Astronomical Observatory of Japan was formed through a reorganization of the university's Tokyo Astronomical Observatory, to oversee the JNLT and other large national astronomy projects.

Construction of the telescope began in April 1991, and later that year, a public contest gave the telescope its official name, Subaru Telescope. Construction was completed in 1998, and the first scientific images were taken in January 1999. In September 1999, Princess Sayako of Japan dedicated the telescope.

A number of state-of-the-art technologies were worked into the telescope design. For example, 261 computer-controlled actuators press the main mirror from underneath, which corrects for primary mirror distortion caused by changes in the telescope's orientation. The telescope enclosure building is also shaped to improve the quality of astronomical images by minimizing the effects caused by atmospheric turbulence.

Subaru is one of the few state-of-the-art telescopes to have been used with the naked eye. For the dedication, an eyepiece was constructed so that Princess Sayako could look through it directly. It was enjoyed by the staff for a few nights until it was replaced with the much more sensitive working instruments.

Subaru is the primary tool in the search for Planet Nine. Its large field of view, 75 times that of the Keck telescopes, and strong light-gathering power are suited for deep wide-field sky surveys. The search, split between a research group led by Konstantin Batygin and Michael Brown and another led by Scott Sheppard and Chad Trujillo, is expected to take up to five years.

=== Accidents during construction ===
Two separate incidents claimed the lives of four workers during the construction of the telescope. On October 13, 1993, 42-year-old Paul F. Lawrence was fatally injured when a forklift tipped over onto him. On January 16, 1996, sparks from a welder ignited insulation which smoldered, generating noxious smoke that killed Marvin Arruda, 52, Ricky Del Rosario, 38, and Warren K. "Kip" Kaleo, 36, and sent twenty-six other workers to the hospital in Hilo. All four workers are memorialized by a plaque outside the base of the telescope dome and a sign posted temporarily each January along the Mauna Kea access road.

=== Mishap in 2011 ===
On July 2, 2011, the telescope operator on-site noted an anomaly from the top unit of the telescope. Upon further examination, coolant from the top unit was found to have leaked over the primary mirror and other parts of the telescope. Observation using Nasmyth foci resumed on July 22, and use of the Cassegrain focus resumed on August 26.

=== Mishap in 2023 ===
On September 15, 2023, an abnormal load-sensor value of the primary-mirror fixed point was observed during a maintenance operational test. Later, a part fell onto the primary mirror during repair work of the mirror cover. Science observation was suspended. After the replacement of sensor and the repair work of the primary mirror damage, it returned to observation on 3 March 2024.

== Instruments ==
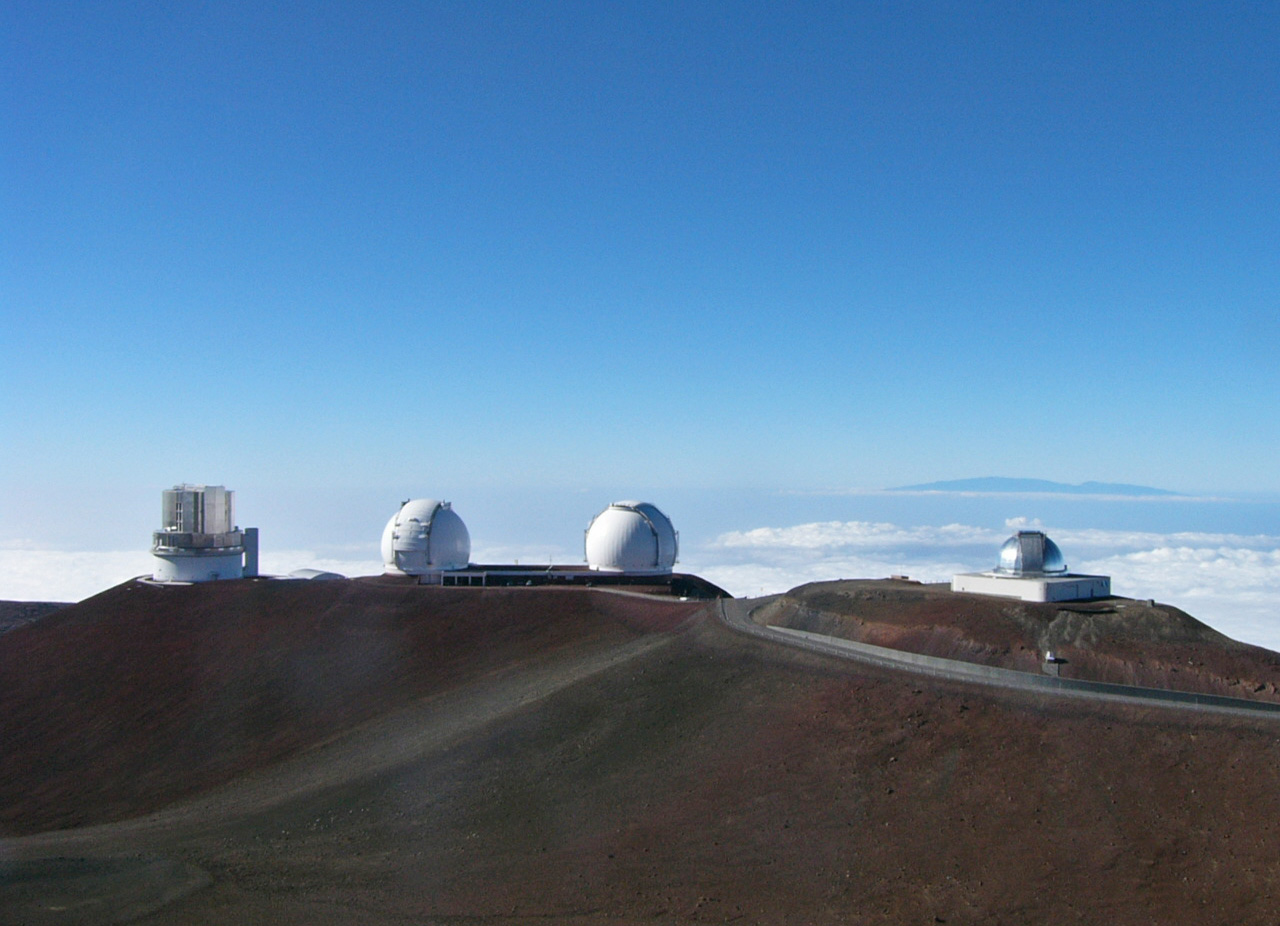
The Subaru alongside the twin W. M. Keck Observatory telescopes and the Infrared Telescope Facility

Several cameras and spectrographs can be mounted at Subaru Telescope's four focal points for observations in visible and infrared wavelengths.

Multi-Object Infrared Camera and Spectrograph (MOIRCS)
Wide-field camera and spectrograph with the ability to take spectra of multiple objects simultaneously, mounted at the Cassegrain focus.
Infrared Camera and Spectrograph (IRCS)
Used in conjunction with the new 188-element adaptive optics unit (AO188), mounted at the infrared Nasmyth focus.
Cooled Mid Infrared Camera and Spectrometer (COMICS)
Mid-infrared camera and spectrometer with the ability to study cool interstellar dust, mounted on the Cassegrain focus. Decommissioned in 2020.
Faint Object Camera And Spectrograph (FOCAS)
Visible-light camera and spectrograph with the ability to take spectra of up to 100 objects simultaneously, mounted on the Cassegrain focus.
Subaru Prime Focus Camera (Suprime-Cam)
80-megapixel wide-field visible-light camera, mounted at the prime focus. Superseded by the Hyper Suprime-Cam in 2012, decommissioned in May 2017.
High Dispersion Spectrograph (HDS)
Visible-light spectrograph mounted at the optical Nasmyth focus.
Fiber Multi Object Spectrograph (FMOS)
Infrared spectrograph using movable fiber optics to take spectra of up to 400 objects simultaneously. Mounted at the prime focus.
High-Contrast Coronographic Imager for Adaptive Optics (HiCIAO)
Infrared camera for hunting planets around other stars. Used with AO188, mounted at the infrared Nasmyth focus.

Dark matter map from 2018 by the Hyper Suprime-Cam survey

Hyper Suprime-Cam (HSC)
This 900-megapixel ultra-wide-field (1.5° field of view) camera saw first light in 2012, and was offered for open use in 2014. The extremely large wide-field correction optics (a seven-element lens with some elements up to a meter in diameter) was manufactured by Canon and delivered March 29, 2011. It will be used for surveys of weak lensing to determine dark matter distribution.
Subaru Coronagraphic Extreme Adaptive Optics (SCExAO)
The Subaru Coronagraphic Extreme Adaptive Optics (SCExAO) instrument is a high-contrast imaging system for directly imaging exoplanets. The coronagraph uses a Phase Induced Amplitude Apodization (PIAA) design which means it will be able to image planets closer to their stars than conventional Lyot type coronagraph designs. For example, at a distance of 100 pc, the PIAA coronagraph on SCExAO would be able to image from 4 AU outwards while Gemini Planet Imager and VLT-SPHERE from 12 AU outwards. The system also has several other types of coronagraph: Vortex, Four-Quadrant Phase Mask and 8-Octant Phase Mask versions, and a shaped-pupil coronagraph. Phase 1 of construction is complete, and phase 2 construction is expected to be complete by end of 2014 for science operations in 2015. SCExAO will initially use the HiCIAO camera, but this will be replaced by CHARIS, an integral field spectrograph, around 2016.

== Science results ==
In 2024, in collaboration with the TESS space telescope, the Subaru telescope discovered planet Gliese 12 b.

== See also ==
Comparison of nominal sizes of apertures of the Subaru Telescope and some notable optical telescopes

- Adaptive optics, a technique of compensating for aberrations in optical systems
- Apodization, a signal processing technique
- Coronagraph, an astronomical device for masking the direct light of a star
- List of largest optical reflecting telescopes
- Pleiades, the English name of the asterism for which the Subaru Telescope is named
- Yūko Kakazu
