= Mariko Hasegawa =

Japanese primatologist and anthropologist (b. 1952)

Mariko Hiraiwa Hasegawa (Japanese: 長谷川眞理子, born 1952) is a Japanese zoologist and anthropologist who studies behavioral ecology, evolutionary psychology, and physical anthropology. Hasegawa served as the president of the Graduate University for Advanced Studies (Sokendai) in Kanagawa Prefecture, Japan, until 2023. She is "among the rare Japanese women primatologists to have gained international recognition."

Her mother Satsue Mito collected field data on Japanese macaque troupes beginning in the 1950s, ultimately documenting four decades worth of behavior. Mito documented the cultural transmission of sweet-potato-washing within a group of wild macaques. During Hasegawa's doctoral studies at the University of Tokyo, she also studied Japanese macaques, as well as Tanzanian chimpanzees. She won a British Council Scholarship and went to Cambridge for zoology. She was on the faculty of Senshu University from 1990 to 2000, at which time she joined the faculty of Waseda University.
