= Yūko Kakazu =

Japanese astronomer

Yūko Kakazu (嘉数悠子 Kakazu Yūko) is a Japanese astronomer. Her specialty is galaxy formation and evolution. She is the Public Outreach Specialist for the Subaru Telescope at the NAOJ Hawaii Observatory.

== Early life and education ==
Yūko Kakazu was born and raised in Okinawa, Japan. Her participation in a Space Camp sponsored by NASA inspired her to pursue a career related to space. After graduating from Okinawa Shogaku High School, she began her studies in the Graduate School of Science and Faculty of Science at Tohoku University. Though she was initially in the Department of Chemistry, she transferred to the Department of Physics. After graduating with her bachelor's degree from Tohoku University, she got her master's degree and Ph.D. in Astronomy at the University of Hawaii at Manoa.

== Career and research ==
She has held research positions in astronomy at the Institut d'astrophysique de Paris (starting in 2008), the California Institute of Technology (starting in 2010), and the University of Chicago (starting in 2011). She began her current position at the NAOJ Hawaii Observatory and Subaru Telescope in September 2013. Her research concerns the formation and evolution of galaxies, which are fundamental components of our universe.

== See also ==
- List of astronomers
