= National Astronomical Observatory of Japan =

Research organization in Japan, US, and Chile

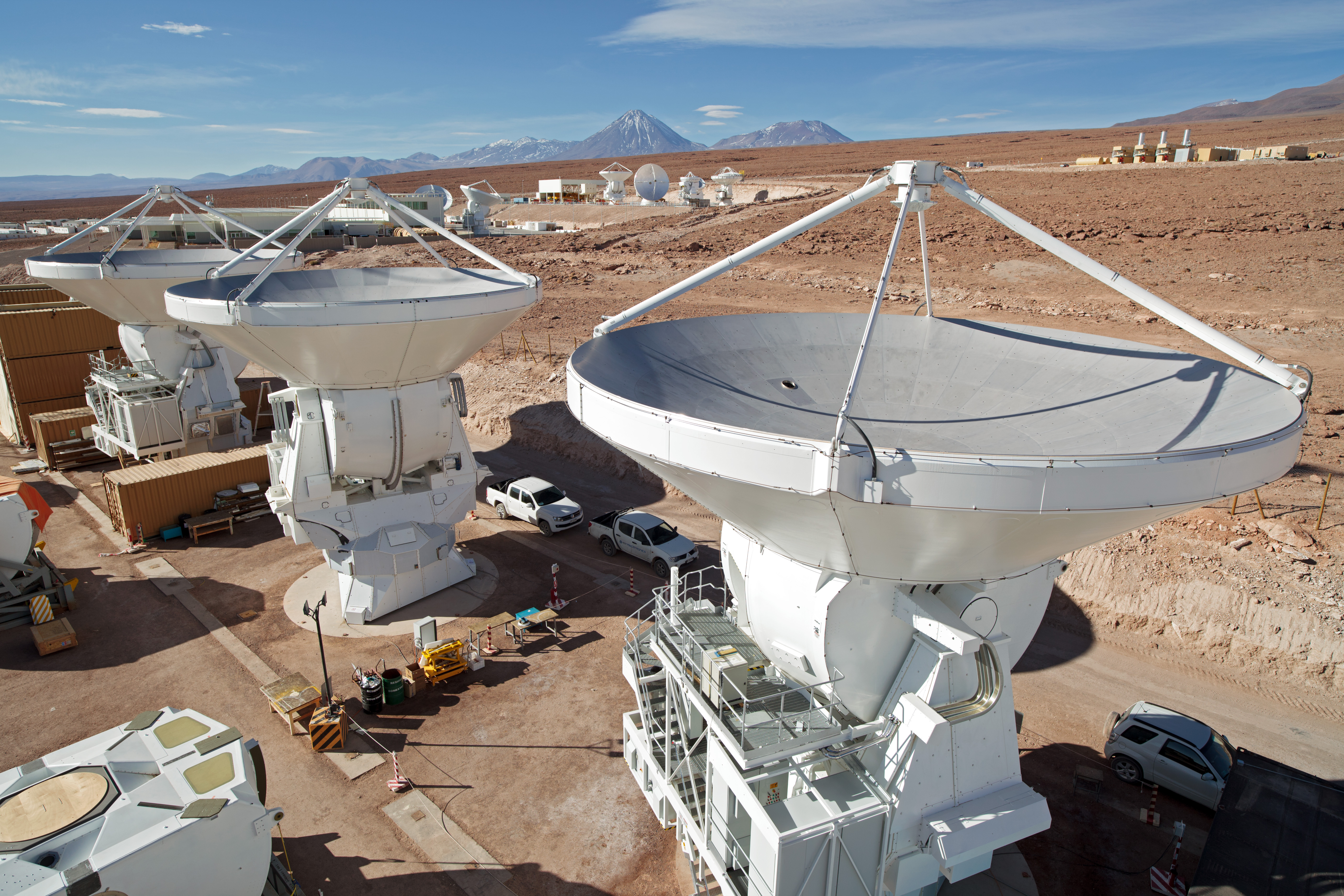
NAOJ is involved in the construction of ALMA.

The National Astronomical Observatory of Japan (国立天文台, kokuritsu tenmondai) (NAOJ) is an astronomical research organisation comprising several facilities in Japan, as well as an observatory in Hawaii and Chile. It was established in 1988 as an amalgamation of three existing research organizations – the Tokyo Astronomical Observatory of the University of Tokyo, International Latitude Observatory of Mizusawa, and a part of Research Institute of Atmospherics of Nagoya University.

In the 2004 reform of national research organizations, NAOJ became a division of the National Institutes of Natural Sciences.

== Facilities ==
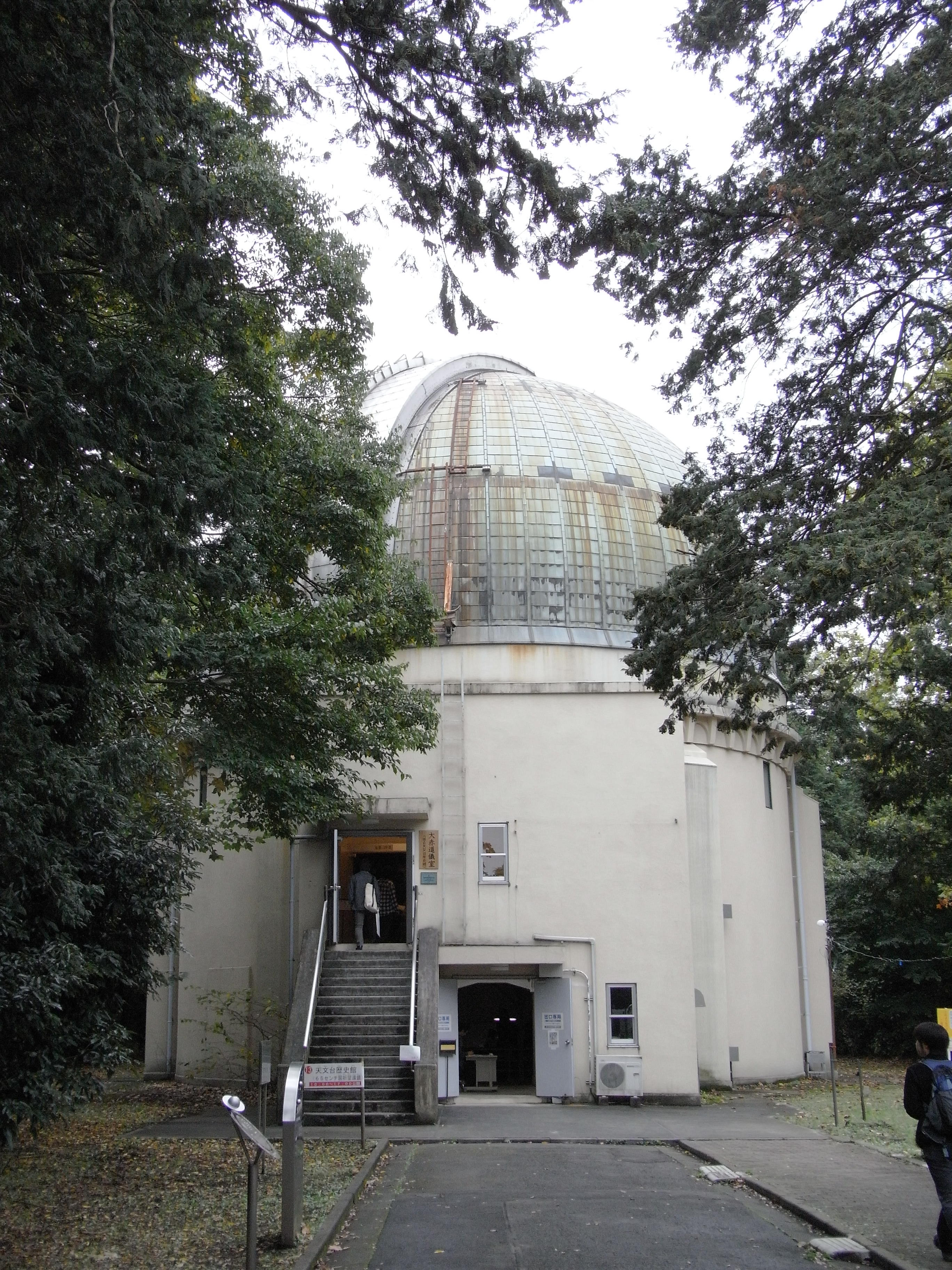
65cm refractor dome, now Observatory History Museum

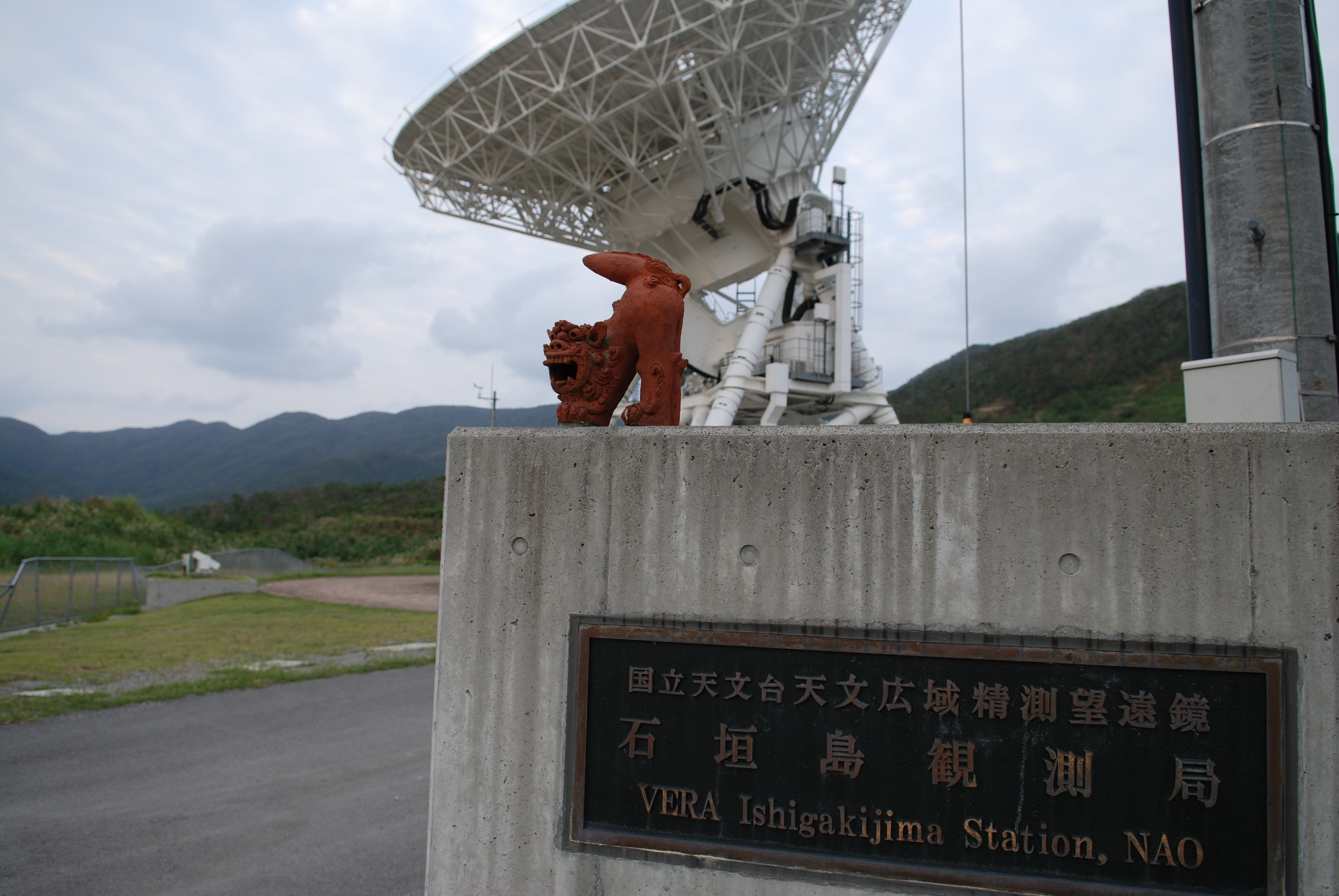
VERA Ishigakijima Station

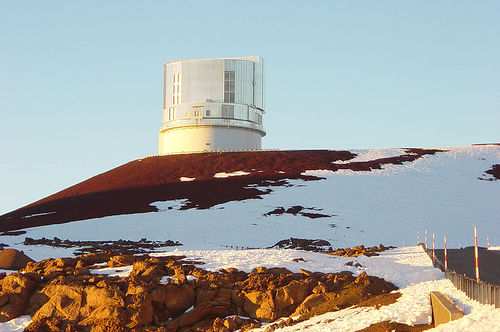
Subaru Telescope

Mitaka Campus (Mitaka, Tokyo. 35°40′31″N 139°32′17″E)
The Headquarters, Astronomy Data Center, Advanced Technology Center, Public Relations Center
Solar Flare Telescope, Sunspot Telescope, TAMA 300 gravitational wave detector
Tokyo Photoelectric Meridian Circle
Historical instruments: Solar Tower Telescope, 65cm refractor dome, 20cm refractor dome

Nobeyama Radio Observatory (Minamimaki, Nagano. 35°56′28″N 138°28′13″E)
45m Millimeter Radio Telescope, Nobeyama Radio Polarimeter
Decommissioned instruments: Nobeyama Millimeter Array, Nobeyama Radio Heliograph

Mizusawa VLBI Observatory (Ōshū, Iwate. 39°08′06″N 141°08′00″E)
VERA Mizusawa Station (20m radio telescope), 10m VLBI radio telescope
Historical building: Dr. Kimura Museum

VERA Ogasawara Station (Ogasawara. 27°05′30″N 142°13′00″E)
20m radio telescope

VERA Iriki Station (Iriki. 31°44′52″N 130°26′24″E)
20m radio telescope

VERA Ishigakijima Station (Ishigakijima. 24°24′43.83″N 124°10′15.58″E)
20m radio telescope

KAGRA (Hida, Gifu. 36°24′42.84″N 137°18′20.88″E)
KAGRA gravitational wave telescope

Ishigakijima Observatory (Ishigakijima)
Murikabushi telescope

Hawaii Observatory (Hawaii)
Subaru 8m telescope (Mauna Kea). 19°49′33″N 155°28′35″W)
Hilo Base Facility (Hilo, Hawaii. 19°42′10″N 155°05′25″W)

Chile Observatory (Atacama Desert, Chile)
Atacama Large Millimeter/submillimeter Array
Atacama Submillimeter Telescope Experiment (ASTE)

Decommissioned Facilities
Norikura Solar Observatory (Mount Norikura, Nagano, 36°07′01″N 137°33′09″E)

Formerly under NAOJ and decommissioned in 2010. Building reused for research purposes, including non-astronomical work for the National Institute of Natural Sciences.

Okayama Astrophysical Observatory (Mount Chikurinji in Asakuchi, Okayama. 34°34′34″N 133°35′39″E)

Facility still belongs to NAOJ, but its 188cm telescope is now operated by the Tokyo Institute of Technology.
Decommissioned telescopes: 91cm telescope, 65cm Coude-Type solar telescope

== NINS ==
In 2004, NAOJ, in alliance with four other national institutes – the National Institute for Basic Biology, the National Institute for Fusion Science, the National Institute for Physiological Sciences, and the Institute for Molecular Science – established the National Institutes of Natural Sciences (NINS) to promote collaboration among researchers of the five constituent institutes.

== Projects with NAOJ involvement ==
- ALMA, ASTE
- SELENE
- VSOP, VSOP-2
- Hinode (Solar-B)
- SPICA (satellite)
- JASMINE
- Hubble Origins Probe

== See also ==
- List of astronomical observatories
- National Institutes of Natural Sciences, Japan
- Yūko Kakazu
