= National Institute for Physiological Sciences, Japan =

Japanese research institute

Coordinates: 34°56′55.9″N 137°9′52.7″E

National Institute for Physiological Sciences
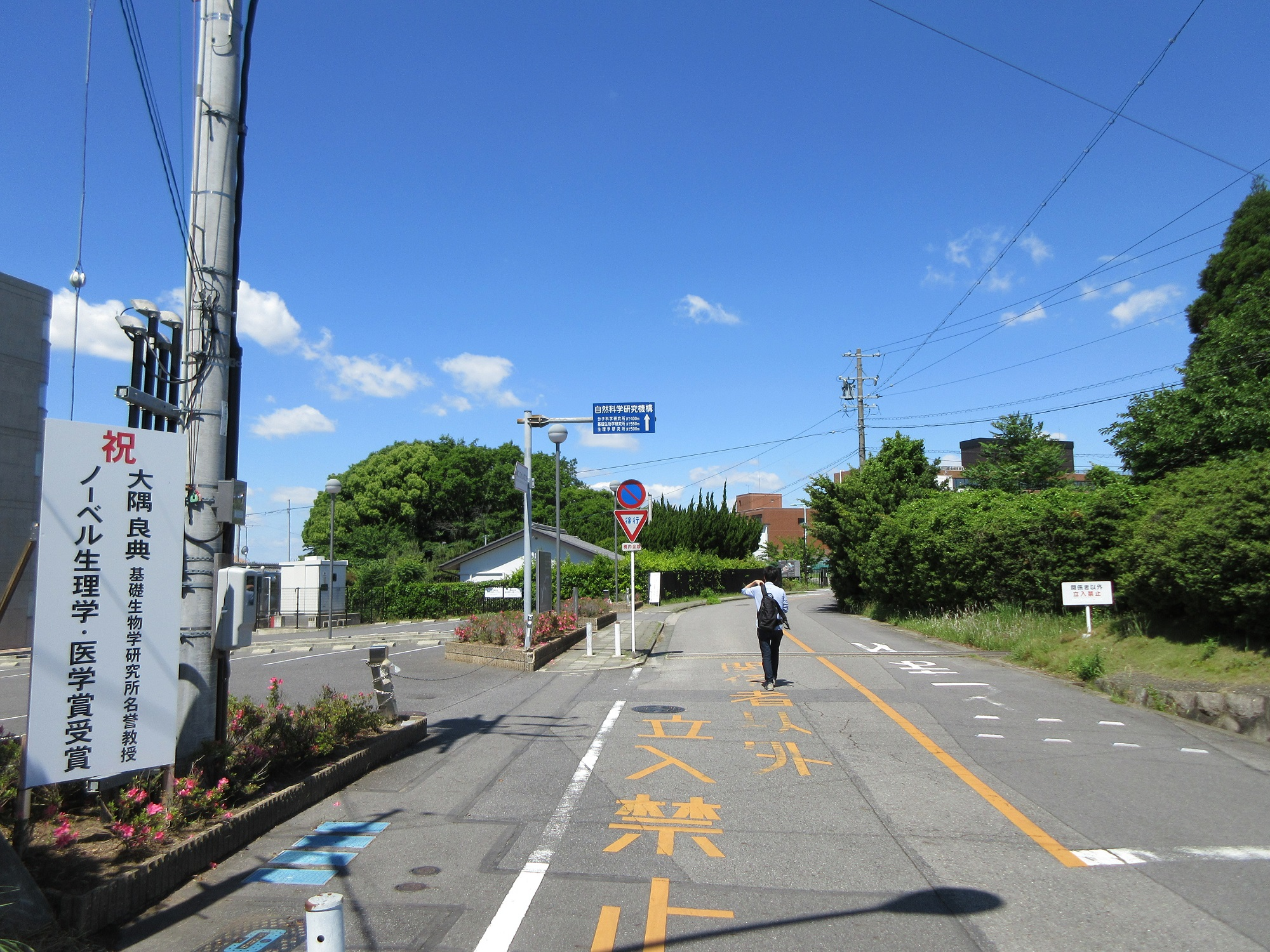
- Myodaiji campus where the NIPS is located
- Established: 2004
- President: Yoshiro Shimura
- Faculty: 56
- Budget: 3.5 Billion yen
- Address: 38 Aza Nishigonaka, Myodaiji, Okazaki, Aichi, Japan
- Location: Okazaki, Japan
- Website: http://www.nips.ac.jp/eng/

The National Institute for Physiological Sciences (生理学研究所, Seirigaku kenkyuujo) (NIPS) is an inter-university research institute and part of the National Institute of Natural Sciences, located in the city of Okazaki, Aichi, Japan. It was established in 2004.
