= Kamioka Gravitational Wave Detector =

Japanese underground gravitational wave detector

Kamioka Gravitational wave detector
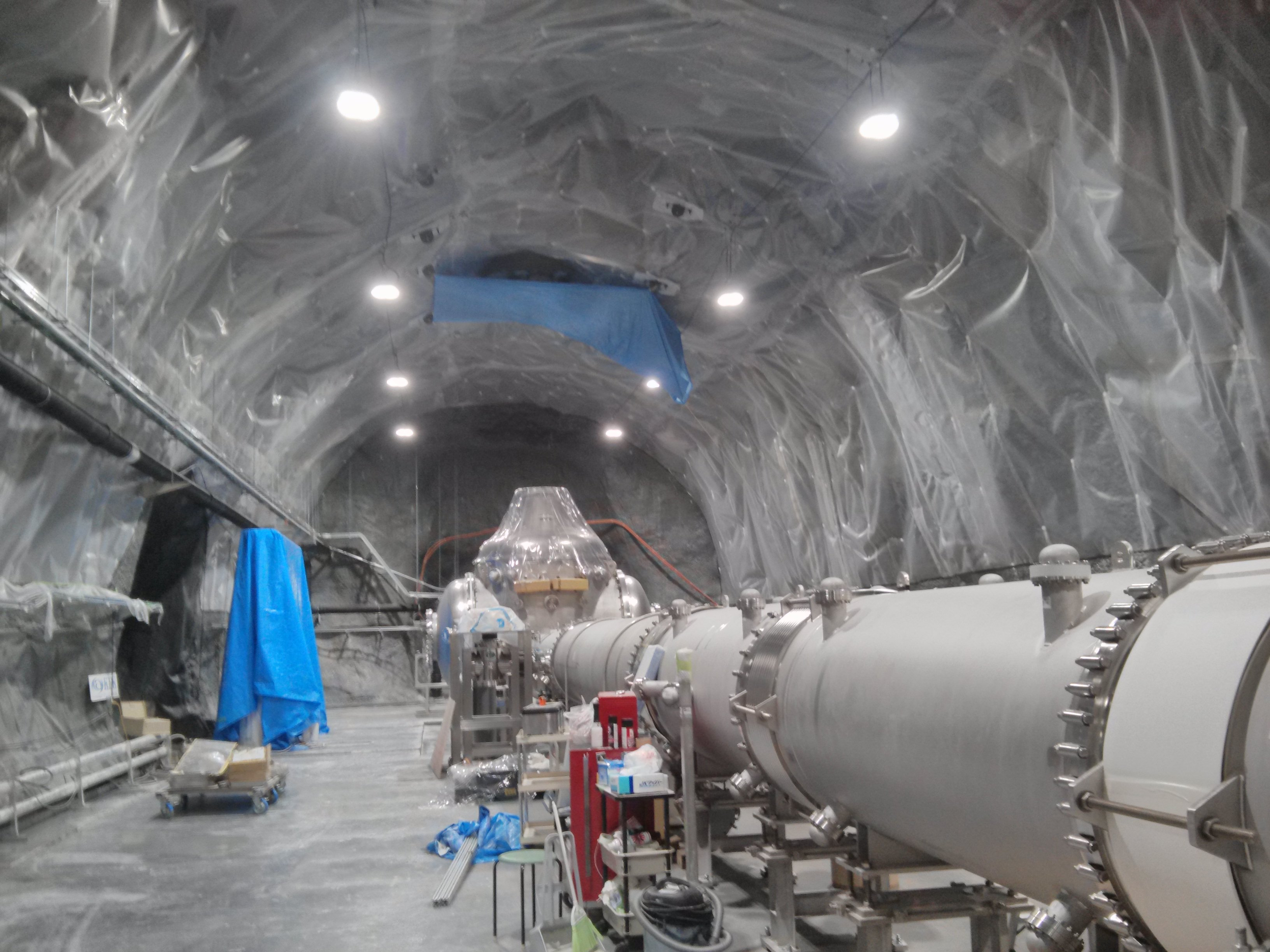
- Alternative names: Kamioka Gravitational wave detector
- Location: Hida, Gifu Prefecture, Japan
- Coordinates: 36°24′43″N 137°18′21″E
- Altitude: 414 m (1,358 ft)
- Length: 3,000 m (9,842 ft 6 in)
- Website: gwcenter.icrr.u-tokyo.ac.jp/en/, gwcenter.icrr.u-tokyo.ac.jp
- Location within Japan
- Related media on Commons

The Kamioka Gravitational Wave Detector (KAGRA) is a large-scale physics experiment designed to detect gravitational waves predicted by the general theory of relativity. It is located underground at the Kamioka Observatory which is near the Kamioka section of the city of Hida, Gifu Prefecture, Japan. KAGRA is a Michelson interferometer with 3-km arm length and is designed to eventually be able to observe gravitational wave signatures from binary neutron star mergers at a distance of up to ~150 Mpc.

KAGRA is operated by the Institute for Cosmic Ray Research (ICRR) of the University of Tokyo, the High Energy Accelerator Research Organization (KEK) and the National Astronomical Observatory of Japan (NAOJ) along with collaborators from a number of other scientific institutions. It is part of the larger LVK collaboration along with LIGO and Virgo.

KAGRA was first conceived in the late 1990s and was formally approved in 2010. Construction was completed in 2019, and it first began observing in 2020. It is Asia's first gravitational wave observatory, the first in the world built underground, and the first whose detector uses cryogenic mirrors. The cryogenic mirrors reduce the thermal noise, while the underground location significantly reduces the noise from seismic waves on the Earth's surface which dominates the noise of LIGO and Virgo at low frequencies. It is expected to eventually reach an operational sensitivity equal to LIGO and Virgo.

KAGRA participated in the O3 observing run of LIGO and Virgo in 2019 and 2020 and in O4a for a month in 2023 before going back to commissioning. The experiment was damaged in the 2024 Noto earthquake but recovered enough to participate in O4c in 2025.

== Name ==
KAGRA was initially known as the Large Scale Cryogenic Gravitational Wave Telescope (LCGT). The LCGT project was approved on 22 June 2010. In January 2012, it was given its new name, KAGRA, deriving the "KA" from its location at the Kamioka mine and "GRA" from gravity and gravitational radiation. The word KAGRA is also a homophonic pun of Kagura (神楽), which is a ritual dance dedicated to Gods in Japanese Shinto shrines. The project is led by Nobelist Takaaki Kajita who had a major role in getting the project funded and constructed. The project was estimated to cost about 200 million US dollars.

== Development and construction ==
Two prototype detectors were constructed to develop the technologies needed for KAGRA. The first, TAMA 300, was located in Mitaka, Tokyo and operated from 1998 to 2008, demonstrating the feasibility of KAGRA. The second, CLIO, started operating in 2006 underground near the KAGRA site. It was used to develop cryogenic technologies for KAGRA.

The detector is housed in a pair of 3 km-long arm tunnels meeting at a 90° angle in the horizontal plane, located more than 200 m underground. The tunnels were excavated at a 1/300 incline to drain spring water. The excavation phase of tunnels was started in May 2012 and was completed on 31 March 2014.

The construction of KAGRA was completed 4 October 2019. KAGRA officially began its first observing run on February 25, 2020, during LIGO and Virgo's O3, reaching a maximum sensitivity range of about 600 kpc, before pausing operation for a month to perform a number of adjustments to the detector. It resumed operation for another 2 weeks in April 2020, during which it reached a maximum sensitivity of around 1 Mpc. KAGRA subsequently participated in O4a in 2023, but sustained significant damage to optics and other hardware as a result of the 2024 Noto Earthquake. It recovered enough to rejoin for parts of O4c in 2025, reaching a maximum sensitivity of around 7 Mpc.

== Operational history ==
After the initial adjustment operations, the first observation run started on 25 February 2020. Because of COVID-19, the observation run was ended 21 April 2020. The sensitivity during this run was only 660 kpc (binary neutron star inspiral range). This is less than 1% the sensitivity of LIGO during the same run, and around 10% of KAGRA's expected sensitivity for the run. Although the sensitivity has not reached the planned 25-130 Mpc level for the O4 observing run, KAGRA joined O4b on 25 May 2023 with a sensitivity of 1 Mpc.

=== Aftermath of 2024 Noto earthquake ===
The 2024 Noto earthquake on 1 January 2024, whose epicenter was about 120 km from KAGRA, damaged 9 of 20 of KAGRA's mirror suspension systems.

=== Restarted the 4th observing run ===
The fourth observing run (O4) of LIGO, Virgo, and KAGRA resumed on 11 June 2025 and was scheduled to continue until 18 November 2025. KAGRA's current sensitivity is approximately 6–7 Mpc. The status of the detectors can be monitored at https://online.ligo.org/.

== See also ==
- Ground-based interferometric gravitational-wave search with LIGO, Virgo, and KAGRA
- TAMA300, an early prototype in Japan.
- CLIO, a current prototype that is developing cryogenic technologies.
- DECIGO, a proposed Japanese space-based interferometer.

== External ==
- Official page (English)
- KAGRA experiment record on INSPIRE-HEP
