= CLIO =

Detector for gravitational waves in Japan

- Alternative names: Cryogenic Laser Interferometer Observatory
- Location(s): Gifu Prefecture, Japan
- Coordinates: 36°25′37″N 137°18′43″E
- Location of CLIO

CLIO (Cryogenic Laser Interferometer Observatory) is a prototype detector for gravitational waves. It is testing cryogenic mirror technologies for the Kamioka Gravitational Wave Detector (KAGRA). It is located in Japan.

== Overview ==
CLIO is an optical interferometer with two perpendicular arms each of 100 m length. The mirrors are cooled to 20 K (−253 °C); this reduces various thermal noise sources which trouble other gravity observatories, but cooling the mirrors (which are heated by the powerful laser used in the interferometer) while keeping them isolated from vibrations is difficult.

CLIO is situated 1000 m underground in the Kamioka Observatory, Gifu Prefecture.

CLIO is one of the science facilities for physics of the Institute for Cosmic Ray Research of the University of Tokyo.
