= Institute for Molecular Science =

Inter-university research institute in Japan

- Abbreviation: IMS
- Formation: April 22, 1975; 51 years ago
- Founder: Hideo Akamatsu
- Purpose: Basic research in molecular science
- Location: Okazaki, Aichi Prefecture, Japan
- Director general: Yoshihito Watanabe
- Parent organization: National Institutes of Natural Sciences, Japan
- Website: https://www.ims.ac.jp/en/

The Institute for Molecular Science (IMS; Japanese: 分子科学研究所) is an inter-university research institute located in Okazaki, Aichi Prefecture, which is part of the National Institutes of Natural Sciences. The IMS was founded in April 1975 with Hideo Akamatsu as the founding director general. Its focus is on the fundamental aspects of molecular sciences, including both theoretical and experimental research. It currently has two campuses, the Myodaiji campus and the Yamate campus, both located in the same city.

== History ==
The history of the IMS paralleled that of the establishment of molecular science, which appeared in 1961, as a research field.

- 1963 – The Molecular Science Research Institute's establishment charter is drafted by Masao Kotani (Gakushuin University), Yasumasa Ihaya (University of Electro-Communications), Shigeyuki Aono (Kanazawa University), and others.
- 1965 – On December 13, the Science Council of Japan recommended the establishment of the Institute for Molecular Science (tentative name). The chairman is Shinichiro Tomonaga.
- 1973 – On October 31, the Academic Council reports that it is appropriate to urgently establish the Institute of Molecular Science, the National Institute of Basic Biology, and the Institute of Physiology (tentative name). Towards the end of the year, Meidaiji-cho, Okazaki, Aichi Prefecture (the former site of Aichi University of Education) was proposed as the location for the Institute of Molecular Science, Institute of Basic Biology, and Institute of Physiology.
- 1974 – On April 11, the Molecular Science Institute Establishment Preparation Office was established at the Institute for Solid State Physics, the University of Tokyo. On July 6, the location of the three laboratories was decided to be Okazaki City, Aichi Prefecture.
- 1975 – On April 22, the National Institute for Molecular Science was established as an affiliated organization of the Ministry of Education due to the enactment of a law that partially revised the National School Establishment Act.
- 1981 – Reorganized as Okazaki National Collaborative Research Institute Molecular Science Institute by merging with the National Institute for Basic Biology.
- 2004 – Established the Inter-university Research Institute Corporation Natural Science Research Institute through corporatization.
- 2017 – Introduced the principal researcher system.

== See also ==
- National Institute of Basic Biology
- National Institutes of Natural Sciences
