= List of minor planets: 885001–886000 =

The following is a partial list of minor planets, running from minor-planet number 885001 through 886000, inclusive. The primary data for this and other partial lists is based on JPL's "Small-Body Orbital Elements" and data available from the Minor Planet Center. Critical list information is also provided by the MPC, unless otherwise specified from Lowell Observatory. A detailed description of the table's columns and additional sources are given on the main page including a complete list of every page in this series, and a statistical break-up on the dynamical classification of minor planets.

Also see the summary list of all named bodies in numerical and alphabetical order, and the corresponding naming citations for the number range of this particular list. New namings may only be added to this list after official publication, as the preannouncement of names is condemned by the Working Group for Small Bodies Nomenclature of the International Astronomical Union.

Near-Earth obj.	MBA (inner)	MBA (outer)	Centaur
Mars-crosser	MBA (middle)	Jupiter trojan	Trans-Neptunian obj.
Unclassified

== 885001–885100 ==
Designation			Discovery			Properties		Ref
Permanent	Provisional	Named after	Date	Site	Discoverer(s)	Category	Diam.	Ref
885001	2018 AK_{25}	—	January 12, 2018	Haleakala	Pan-STARRS 1	·	2.2 km	MPC · JPL
885002	2018 AW_{27}	—	January 12, 2018	Haleakala	Pan-STARRS 1	L5	6.0 km	MPC · JPL
885003	2018 AB_{29}	—	January 14, 2018	Mount Lemmon	Mount Lemmon Survey	ADE	1.5 km	MPC · JPL
885004	2018 AL_{29}	—	October 25, 2016	Haleakala	Pan-STARRS 1	EUN	1.0 km	MPC · JPL
885005	2018 AA_{33}	—	January 15, 2018	Haleakala	Pan-STARRS 1	·	930 m	MPC · JPL
885006	2018 AB_{35}	—	January 13, 2018	Mount Lemmon	Mount Lemmon Survey	(5)	890 m	MPC · JPL
885007	2018 AF_{35}	—	January 14, 2018	Haleakala	Pan-STARRS 1	EUN	820 m	MPC · JPL
885008	2018 AJ_{35}	—	January 15, 2018	Haleakala	Pan-STARRS 1	·	1.5 km	MPC · JPL
885009	2018 AM_{35}	—	January 14, 2018	Haleakala	Pan-STARRS 1	(5)	770 m	MPC · JPL
885010	2018 AV_{39}	—	January 11, 2018	Haleakala	Pan-STARRS 1	·	720 m	MPC · JPL
885011	2018 AF_{40}	—	January 12, 2018	Haleakala	Pan-STARRS 1	MRX	660 m	MPC · JPL
885012	2018 AV_{45}	—	January 14, 2018	Haleakala	Pan-STARRS 1	·	790 m	MPC · JPL
885013	2018 AP_{53}	—	January 12, 2018	Mount Lemmon	Mount Lemmon Survey	BAR	1.4 km	MPC · JPL
885014	2018 AR_{54}	—	January 14, 2018	Haleakala	Pan-STARRS 1	·	1.0 km	MPC · JPL
885015	2018 AD_{57}	—	January 13, 2018	Mount Lemmon	Mount Lemmon Survey	·	1.1 km	MPC · JPL
885016	2018 AQ_{58}	—	January 14, 2018	Haleakala	Pan-STARRS 1	·	1.3 km	MPC · JPL
885017	2018 AW_{61}	—	January 7, 2018	Haleakala	Pan-STARRS 1	EUN	910 m	MPC · JPL
885018	2018 AE_{67}	—	January 14, 2018	Mount Lemmon	Mount Lemmon Survey	·	830 m	MPC · JPL
885019	2018 BA_{1}	—	December 13, 2017	Mount Lemmon	Mount Lemmon Survey	·	1.2 km	MPC · JPL
885020	2018 BK_{1}	—	January 14, 2011	Mount Lemmon	Mount Lemmon Survey	APO	330 m	MPC · JPL
885021	2018 BY_{2}	—	January 17, 2018	Haleakala	Pan-STARRS 1	AMO · APO · PHA	290 m	MPC · JPL
885022	2018 BB_{4}	—	January 20, 2018	Mount Lemmon	Mount Lemmon Survey	H	460 m	MPC · JPL
885023	2018 BP_{4}	—	December 2, 2004	Catalina	CSS	·	1.3 km	MPC · JPL
885024	2018 BU_{4}	—	January 20, 2018	Haleakala	Pan-STARRS 1	H	390 m	MPC · JPL
885025	2018 BT_{5}	—	December 23, 2017	Haleakala	Pan-STARRS 1	H	350 m	MPC · JPL
885026	2018 BV_{6}	—	November 27, 2014	Haleakala	Pan-STARRS 1	H	450 m	MPC · JPL
885027	2018 BN_{8}	—	December 13, 2017	Haleakala	Pan-STARRS 1	·	980 m	MPC · JPL
885028	2018 BM_{13}	—	January 20, 2018	Haleakala	Pan-STARRS 1	·	910 m	MPC · JPL
885029	2018 BN_{13}	—	March 28, 2014	Mount Lemmon	Mount Lemmon Survey	·	690 m	MPC · JPL
885030	2018 BJ_{14}	—	January 19, 2018	Mount Lemmon	Mount Lemmon Survey	H	380 m	MPC · JPL
885031	2018 BW_{14}	—	January 23, 2018	Mount Lemmon	Mount Lemmon Survey	(116763)	1.2 km	MPC · JPL
885032	2018 BU_{18}	—	January 16, 2018	Haleakala	Pan-STARRS 1	L5	6.2 km	MPC · JPL
885033	2018 BN_{24}	—	January 23, 2018	Haleakala	Pan-STARRS 1	·	1.1 km	MPC · JPL
885034	2018 BM_{25}	—	January 23, 2014	Catalina	CSS	·	920 m	MPC · JPL
885035	2018 BF_{27}	—	January 23, 2018	Mount Lemmon	Mount Lemmon Survey	·	900 m	MPC · JPL
885036	2018 BV_{27}	—	January 24, 2018	Mount Lemmon	Mount Lemmon Survey	HNS	740 m	MPC · JPL
885037	2018 BF_{33}	—	December 28, 2017	Mount Lemmon	Mount Lemmon Survey	·	910 m	MPC · JPL
885038	2018 BH_{35}	—	January 16, 2018	Haleakala	Pan-STARRS 1	·	1.1 km	MPC · JPL
885039	2018 BT_{37}	—	January 27, 2018	Mount Lemmon	Mount Lemmon Survey	·	1.2 km	MPC · JPL
885040	2018 BK_{87}	—	August 28, 2016	Mount Lemmon	Mount Lemmon Survey	·	970 m	MPC · JPL
885041	2018 BR_{128}	—	April 23, 2014	Cerro Tololo-DECam	DECam	·	970 m	MPC · JPL
885042	2018 BU_{128}	—	January 16, 2018	Haleakala	Pan-STARRS 1	L5	6.7 km	MPC · JPL
885043	2018 CK_{4}	—	December 13, 2017	Mount Lemmon	Mount Lemmon Survey	H	430 m	MPC · JPL
885044	2018 CB_{7}	—	November 20, 2017	Haleakala	Pan-STARRS 1	(5)	840 m	MPC · JPL
885045	2018 CU_{11}	—	October 18, 2012	Haleakala	Pan-STARRS 1	·	1.0 km	MPC · JPL
885046	2018 CC_{17}	—	February 10, 2018	Mount Lemmon	Mount Lemmon Survey	H	340 m	MPC · JPL
885047	2018 CL_{17}	—	February 5, 2018	Mount Lemmon	Mount Lemmon Survey	·	1.0 km	MPC · JPL
885048	2018 CT_{19}	—	February 11, 2018	Haleakala	Pan-STARRS 1	HNS	900 m	MPC · JPL
885049	2018 CO_{21}	—	April 23, 2014	Cerro Tololo	DECam	·	1.2 km	MPC · JPL
885050	2018 CC_{23}	—	February 8, 2018	Mount Lemmon	Mount Lemmon Survey	·	960 m	MPC · JPL
885051	2018 CW_{24}	—	February 12, 2018	Haleakala	Pan-STARRS 1	·	880 m	MPC · JPL
885052	2018 CQ_{27}	—	May 20, 2015	Cerro Tololo	DECam	(5)	840 m	MPC · JPL
885053	2018 CR_{27}	—	April 28, 2014	Cerro Tololo	DECam	(11097)	1.1 km	MPC · JPL
885054	2018 CT_{33}	—	February 9, 2018	Mount Lemmon	Mount Lemmon Survey	GAL	1.1 km	MPC · JPL
885055	2018 DA_{3}	—	January 17, 2013	Haleakala	Pan-STARRS 1	·	1.7 km	MPC · JPL
885056	2018 DT_{4}	—	March 7, 2008	Kitt Peak	Spacewatch	·	480 m	MPC · JPL
885057	2018 DU_{5}	—	April 5, 2014	Haleakala	Pan-STARRS 1	·	1.1 km	MPC · JPL
885058	2018 DM_{8}	—	February 25, 2018	Mount Lemmon	Mount Lemmon Survey	·	980 m	MPC · JPL
885059	2018 EA	—	January 27, 2006	Mount Lemmon	Mount Lemmon Survey	·	1 km	MPC · JPL
885060	2018 EC_{3}	—	May 1, 2011	Mount Lemmon	Mount Lemmon Survey	T_{j} (2.75) · unusual	3.2 km	MPC · JPL
885061	2018 EX_{5}	—	January 29, 2009	Mount Lemmon	Mount Lemmon Survey	·	1.3 km	MPC · JPL
885062	2018 EK_{10}	—	March 10, 2018	Haleakala	Pan-STARRS 1	·	740 m	MPC · JPL
885063	2018 EY_{18}	—	March 10, 2018	Haleakala	Pan-STARRS 1	L5	6.4 km	MPC · JPL
885064	2018 FC	—	March 16, 2018	Mount Lemmon	Mount Lemmon Survey	·	690 m	MPC · JPL
885065	2018 FG	—	May 2, 2010	WISE	WISE	·	1.1 km	MPC · JPL
885066	2018 FJ_{1}	—	October 25, 2008	Mount Lemmon	Mount Lemmon Survey	·	940 m	MPC · JPL
885067	2018 FS_{3}	—	March 20, 2018	Catalina	CSS	APO · PHA	180 m	MPC · JPL
885068	2018 FW_{28}	—	March 8, 2009	Mount Lemmon	Mount Lemmon Survey	526	1.7 km	MPC · JPL
885069	2018 FD_{31}	—	March 21, 2018	Mount Lemmon	Mount Lemmon Survey	·	1.8 km	MPC · JPL
885070	2018 FO_{31}	—	March 27, 2018	Mount Lemmon	Mount Lemmon Survey	·	1.6 km	MPC · JPL
885071	2018 FD_{32}	—	March 17, 2018	Haleakala	Pan-STARRS 1	·	1.1 km	MPC · JPL
885072	2018 FQ_{32}	—	January 31, 2004	Sacramento Peak	SDSS	·	1.6 km	MPC · JPL
885073	2018 FF_{33}	—	March 18, 2018	Haleakala	Pan-STARRS 1	·	1.3 km	MPC · JPL
885074	2018 FS_{34}	—	March 17, 2018	Mount Lemmon	Mount Lemmon Survey	·	1.1 km	MPC · JPL
885075	2018 FU_{36}	—	May 9, 2014	Haleakala	Pan-STARRS 1	HNS	790 m	MPC · JPL
885076	2018 FX_{36}	—	March 16, 2018	Mount Lemmon	Mount Lemmon Survey	DOR	1.6 km	MPC · JPL
885077	2018 FN_{38}	—	March 17, 2018	Mount Lemmon	Mount Lemmon Survey	TRE	1.8 km	MPC · JPL
885078	2018 FK_{39}	—	March 18, 2018	Haleakala	Pan-STARRS 1	·	1.5 km	MPC · JPL
885079	2018 FX_{39}	—	March 17, 2018	Mount Lemmon	Mount Lemmon Survey	·	1 km	MPC · JPL
885080	2018 FB_{40}	—	March 17, 2018	Haleakala	Pan-STARRS 1	·	1.3 km	MPC · JPL
885081	2018 FR_{40}	—	March 18, 2018	Haleakala	Pan-STARRS 1	·	920 m	MPC · JPL
885082	2018 FS_{40}	—	April 5, 2014	Haleakala	Pan-STARRS 1	HNS	780 m	MPC · JPL
885083	2018 FO_{41}	—	March 17, 2018	Mount Lemmon	Mount Lemmon Survey	EUN	710 m	MPC · JPL
885084	2018 FB_{43}	—	January 13, 2005	Kitt Peak	Spacewatch	·	890 m	MPC · JPL
885085	2018 FD_{44}	—	March 18, 2018	Haleakala	Pan-STARRS 1	(1547)	1.1 km	MPC · JPL
885086	2018 FY_{44}	—	May 7, 2014	Haleakala	Pan-STARRS 1	·	950 m	MPC · JPL
885087	2018 FC_{48}	—	March 17, 2018	Haleakala	Pan-STARRS 1	·	1.2 km	MPC · JPL
885088	2018 FJ_{51}	—	March 17, 2018	Mount Lemmon	Mount Lemmon Survey	·	1.1 km	MPC · JPL
885089	2018 FE_{52}	—	April 25, 2014	Mount Lemmon	Mount Lemmon Survey	·	1.1 km	MPC · JPL
885090	2018 FZ_{52}	—	June 2, 2014	Haleakala	Pan-STARRS 1	·	1.2 km	MPC · JPL
885091	2018 FL_{53}	—	April 23, 2014	Cerro Tololo	DECam	JUN	560 m	MPC · JPL
885092	2018 FS_{53}	—	April 5, 2014	Haleakala	Pan-STARRS 1	(5)	750 m	MPC · JPL
885093	2018 FN_{64}	—	March 17, 2018	Haleakala	Pan-STARRS 1	·	1.4 km	MPC · JPL
885094	2018 FG_{66}	—	March 19, 2018	Haleakala	Pan-STARRS 1	L5	6.2 km	MPC · JPL
885095	2018 FY_{77}	—	March 18, 2018	Haleakala	Pan-STARRS 1	·	540 m	MPC · JPL
885096	2018 GQ_{3}	—	November 20, 2008	Kitt Peak	Spacewatch	·	840 m	MPC · JPL
885097	2018 GZ_{5}	—	April 30, 2014	Haleakala	Pan-STARRS 1	·	780 m	MPC · JPL
885098	2018 GR_{6}	—	December 22, 2012	Haleakala	Pan-STARRS 1	·	1.4 km	MPC · JPL
885099	2018 GN_{11}	—	February 23, 2018	Mount Lemmon	Mount Lemmon Survey	·	1.5 km	MPC · JPL
885100	2018 GG_{12}	—	November 9, 2007	Mount Lemmon	Mount Lemmon Survey	·	1.0 km	MPC · JPL

== 885101–885200 ==
back to top

Designation			Discovery			Properties		Ref
Permanent	Provisional	Named after	Date	Site	Discoverer(s)	Category	Diam.	Ref
885101	2018 GX_{15}	—	April 11, 2018	Mount Lemmon	Mount Lemmon Survey	·	2.0 km	MPC · JPL
885102	2018 GC_{17}	—	April 15, 2018	Mount Lemmon	Mount Lemmon Survey	·	1.0 km	MPC · JPL
885103	2018 GC_{18}	—	April 15, 2018	Mount Lemmon	Mount Lemmon Survey	·	1.9 km	MPC · JPL
885104	2018 GS_{19}	—	April 11, 2018	Mount Lemmon	Mount Lemmon Survey	HNS	890 m	MPC · JPL
885105	2018 GT_{19}	—	April 7, 2018	Cerro Paranal	Gaia Ground Based Optical Tracking	EUN	1.0 km	MPC · JPL
885106	2018 GA_{23}	—	April 15, 2018	Mount Lemmon	Mount Lemmon Survey	·	870 m	MPC · JPL
885107	2018 GF_{23}	—	April 13, 2018	Haleakala	Pan-STARRS 1	·	1.2 km	MPC · JPL
885108	2018 GR_{23}	—	February 3, 2009	Mount Lemmon	Mount Lemmon Survey	·	770 m	MPC · JPL
885109	2018 GT_{23}	—	April 12, 2018	Haleakala	Pan-STARRS 1	·	1.4 km	MPC · JPL
885110	2018 GA_{29}	—	April 10, 2018	Mount Lemmon	Mount Lemmon Survey	·	1.6 km	MPC · JPL
885111	2018 HG	—	March 9, 2018	Mount Lemmon	Mount Lemmon Survey	H	360 m	MPC · JPL
885112	2018 HU_{2}	—	January 24, 2018	Mount Lemmon	Mount Lemmon Survey	·	1.4 km	MPC · JPL
885113	2018 HV_{5}	—	April 23, 2018	Mount Lemmon	Mount Lemmon Survey	·	1.3 km	MPC · JPL
885114	2018 HD_{6}	—	April 21, 2018	Mount Lemmon	Mount Lemmon Survey	·	1.0 km	MPC · JPL
885115	2018 HN_{7}	—	April 23, 2018	Mount Lemmon	Mount Lemmon Survey	·	1.9 km	MPC · JPL
885116	2018 HK_{8}	—	April 16, 2018	Haleakala	Pan-STARRS 1	·	1.5 km	MPC · JPL
885117	2018 HP_{8}	—	April 16, 2018	Haleakala	Pan-STARRS 1	·	1.0 km	MPC · JPL
885118	2018 HQ_{9}	—	April 23, 2018	Mount Lemmon	Mount Lemmon Survey	·	810 m	MPC · JPL
885119	2018 HV_{9}	—	April 19, 2018	Mount Lemmon	Mount Lemmon Survey	·	1.4 km	MPC · JPL
885120	2018 JA	—	May 3, 2018	Catalina	CSS	APO · PHA	280 m	MPC · JPL
885121	2018 JJ_{6}	—	February 27, 2012	Haleakala	Pan-STARRS 1	EOS	1.3 km	MPC · JPL
885122	2018 JD_{7}	—	March 16, 2007	Kitt Peak	Spacewatch	·	1.6 km	MPC · JPL
885123	2018 JF_{7}	—	May 9, 2018	XuYi	PMO NEO Survey Program	·	980 m	MPC · JPL
885124	2018 JO_{7}	—	September 9, 2002	Palomar	NEAT	·	830 m	MPC · JPL
885125	2018 JT_{7}	—	May 13, 2018	Mount Lemmon	Mount Lemmon Survey	·	1.1 km	MPC · JPL
885126	2018 JK_{9}	—	May 13, 2018	Mount Lemmon	Mount Lemmon Survey	·	1.0 km	MPC · JPL
885127	2018 JV_{9}	—	May 9, 2018	Kitt Peak	Spacewatch	·	1.6 km	MPC · JPL
885128	2018 JQ_{12}	—	May 14, 2018	Mount Lemmon	Mount Lemmon Survey	·	750 m	MPC · JPL
885129	2018 JG_{14}	—	May 12, 2018	Mount Lemmon	Mount Lemmon Survey	·	1.4 km	MPC · JPL
885130	2018 KY_{3}	—	August 21, 2015	Haleakala	Pan-STARRS 1	·	770 m	MPC · JPL
885131	2018 KR_{4}	—	May 18, 2018	Mount Lemmon	Mount Lemmon Survey	·	940 m	MPC · JPL
885132	2018 KF_{7}	—	May 19, 2018	Haleakala	Pan-STARRS 1	THM	1.6 km	MPC · JPL
885133	2018 KN_{8}	—	May 21, 2018	Haleakala	Pan-STARRS 1	·	1.2 km	MPC · JPL
885134	2018 KL_{10}	—	May 19, 2018	Haleakala	Pan-STARRS 1	·	1.5 km	MPC · JPL
885135	2018 KS_{11}	—	May 19, 2018	Haleakala	Pan-STARRS 1	·	1.3 km	MPC · JPL
885136	2018 KZ_{12}	—	May 19, 2018	Haleakala	Pan-STARRS 1	·	940 m	MPC · JPL
885137	2018 KD_{13}	—	February 25, 2017	Haleakala	Pan-STARRS 1	EOS	1.2 km	MPC · JPL
885138	2018 LF_{9}	—	April 12, 2012	Haleakala	Pan-STARRS 1	LIX	2.2 km	MPC · JPL
885139	2018 LK_{11}	—	July 29, 2014	Haleakala	Pan-STARRS 1	·	1.3 km	MPC · JPL
885140	2018 LM_{16}	—	October 22, 2003	Sacramento Peak	SDSS	·	1.6 km	MPC · JPL
885141	2018 LW_{16}	—	June 6, 2018	Haleakala	Pan-STARRS 1	TIR	1.7 km	MPC · JPL
885142	2018 LY_{16}	—	November 26, 2014	Haleakala	Pan-STARRS 1	·	2.0 km	MPC · JPL
885143	2018 LD_{17}	—	June 15, 2018	Haleakala	Pan-STARRS 1	EOS	1.2 km	MPC · JPL
885144	2018 LH_{17}	—	June 6, 2018	Haleakala	Pan-STARRS 1	·	1.7 km	MPC · JPL
885145	2018 LD_{18}	—	August 15, 2013	Haleakala	Pan-STARRS 1	EOS	1.2 km	MPC · JPL
885146	2018 LD_{21}	—	June 15, 2018	Haleakala	Pan-STARRS 1	EUP	2.4 km	MPC · JPL
885147	2018 LG_{21}	—	June 15, 2018	Haleakala	Pan-STARRS 1	·	1.4 km	MPC · JPL
885148	2018 LL_{22}	—	June 10, 2018	Haleakala	Pan-STARRS 1	·	1.8 km	MPC · JPL
885149	2018 LU_{24}	—	June 12, 2018	Haleakala	Pan-STARRS 1	·	1.9 km	MPC · JPL
885150	2018 LE_{25}	—	June 6, 2018	Haleakala	Pan-STARRS 1	EUN	940 m	MPC · JPL
885151	2018 LH_{30}	—	June 14, 2018	Mount Lemmon	Mount Lemmon Survey	·	2.7 km	MPC · JPL
885152	2018 LL_{31}	—	January 16, 2015	Haleakala	Pan-STARRS 1	EUP	2.2 km	MPC · JPL
885153	2018 LM_{34}	—	June 15, 2018	Haleakala	Pan-STARRS 1	·	2.3 km	MPC · JPL
885154	2018 LN_{34}	—	June 13, 2018	Haleakala	Pan-STARRS 1	T_{j} (2.99)	2.8 km	MPC · JPL
885155	2018 LE_{36}	—	June 15, 2018	Haleakala	Pan-STARRS 1	·	2.0 km	MPC · JPL
885156	2018 LC_{49}	—	June 15, 2018	Haleakala	Pan-STARRS 1	·	1.9 km	MPC · JPL
885157	2018 LM_{53}	—	June 11, 2018	Haleakala	Pan-STARRS 1	·	1.3 km	MPC · JPL
885158	2018 LO_{53}	—	October 28, 2014	Haleakala	Pan-STARRS 1	·	1.4 km	MPC · JPL
885159	2018 MQ_{2}	—	March 31, 2013	Palomar	Palomar Transient Factory	·	1.5 km	MPC · JPL
885160	2018 MZ_{8}	—	June 17, 2018	Haleakala	Pan-STARRS 1	·	1.8 km	MPC · JPL
885161	2018 MD_{9}	—	July 28, 2001	Haleakala	NEAT	·	2.5 km	MPC · JPL
885162	2018 ME_{9}	—	June 18, 2018	Haleakala	Pan-STARRS 1	·	1.5 km	MPC · JPL
885163	2018 MG_{9}	—	June 17, 2018	Haleakala	Pan-STARRS 1	·	2.0 km	MPC · JPL
885164	2018 MY_{10}	—	June 18, 2012	Mount Lemmon	Mount Lemmon Survey	·	2.5 km	MPC · JPL
885165	2018 MW_{11}	—	June 17, 2018	Haleakala	Pan-STARRS 1	NYS	1.0 km	MPC · JPL
885166	2018 MQ_{13}	—	June 18, 2018	Haleakala	Pan-STARRS 1	·	2.1 km	MPC · JPL
885167	2018 MC_{15}	—	June 21, 2018	Haleakala	Pan-STARRS 1	·	500 m	MPC · JPL
885168	2018 MK_{15}	—	March 28, 2016	Cerro Tololo	DECam	·	2.0 km	MPC · JPL
885169	2018 MS_{17}	—	June 17, 2018	Haleakala	Pan-STARRS 1	(7605)	2.5 km	MPC · JPL
885170	2018 MF_{24}	—	June 16, 2018	Haleakala	Pan-STARRS 1	LIX	2.2 km	MPC · JPL
885171	2018 MO_{25}	—	June 18, 2018	Mount Lemmon	Mount Lemmon Survey	T_{j} (2.95)	2.1 km	MPC · JPL
885172	2018 MB_{26}	—	April 23, 2014	Cerro Tololo	DECam	·	420 m	MPC · JPL
885173	2018 MK_{42}	—	June 23, 2018	Haleakala	Pan-STARRS 1	·	2.5 km	MPC · JPL
885174	2018 MC_{45}	—	June 18, 2018	Haleakala	Pan-STARRS 1	L4	6.4 km	MPC · JPL
885175	2018 NH_{5}	—	June 27, 2014	Haleakala	Pan-STARRS 1	·	1.4 km	MPC · JPL
885176	2018 NK_{6}	—	January 27, 2017	Mount Lemmon	Mount Lemmon Survey	·	1.8 km	MPC · JPL
885177	2018 NZ_{6}	—	January 13, 2016	Kitt Peak	Spacewatch	·	3.1 km	MPC · JPL
885178	2018 NQ_{8}	—	January 20, 2015	Haleakala	Pan-STARRS 1	·	2.0 km	MPC · JPL
885179	2018 NZ_{12}	—	January 7, 2016	Haleakala	Pan-STARRS 1	·	2.0 km	MPC · JPL
885180	2018 NQ_{18}	—	April 17, 2013	Haleakala	Pan-STARRS 1	·	1.2 km	MPC · JPL
885181	2018 NA_{20}	—	July 11, 2018	Haleakala	Pan-STARRS 1	·	1.9 km	MPC · JPL
885182	2018 NW_{20}	—	July 10, 2018	Haleakala	Pan-STARRS 1	EOS	1.2 km	MPC · JPL
885183	2018 NX_{20}	—	July 10, 2018	Haleakala	Pan-STARRS 1	·	1.6 km	MPC · JPL
885184	2018 NZ_{20}	—	January 16, 2015	Haleakala	Pan-STARRS 1	EOS	1.5 km	MPC · JPL
885185	2018 NB_{21}	—	July 12, 2018	Haleakala	Pan-STARRS 2	·	2.1 km	MPC · JPL
885186	2018 NE_{21}	—	July 4, 2018	Haleakala	Pan-STARRS 1	·	1.4 km	MPC · JPL
885187	2018 NL_{21}	—	July 8, 2018	Haleakala	Pan-STARRS 1	·	2.5 km	MPC · JPL
885188	2018 NY_{23}	—	July 9, 2018	Haleakala	Pan-STARRS 1	PHO	740 m	MPC · JPL
885189	2018 NA_{24}	—	July 9, 2018	Haleakala	Pan-STARRS 1	VER	2.1 km	MPC · JPL
885190	2018 NL_{24}	—	July 8, 2018	Haleakala	Pan-STARRS 1	·	2.2 km	MPC · JPL
885191	2018 NS_{24}	—	March 28, 2016	Cerro Tololo	DECam	·	1.1 km	MPC · JPL
885192	2018 NA_{26}	—	March 30, 2016	Cerro Tololo	DECam	T_{j} (2.98)	2.0 km	MPC · JPL
885193	2018 NU_{26}	—	July 8, 2018	Haleakala	Pan-STARRS 1	·	2.3 km	MPC · JPL
885194	2018 NJ_{27}	—	March 28, 2016	Cerro Tololo	DECam	EOS	1.3 km	MPC · JPL
885195	2018 NB_{29}	—	July 8, 2018	Haleakala	Pan-STARRS 1	TIR	1.8 km	MPC · JPL
885196	2018 NS_{29}	—	July 11, 2018	Haleakala	Pan-STARRS 1	·	2.0 km	MPC · JPL
885197	2018 NY_{34}	—	July 10, 2018	Haleakala	Pan-STARRS 1	·	2.0 km	MPC · JPL
885198	2018 ND_{35}	—	July 13, 2018	Haleakala	Pan-STARRS 1	·	2.2 km	MPC · JPL
885199	2018 NR_{40}	—	July 12, 2018	Haleakala	Pan-STARRS 2	·	2.7 km	MPC · JPL
885200	2018 NK_{43}	—	April 27, 2017	Haleakala	Pan-STARRS 1	·	2.2 km	MPC · JPL

== 885201–885300 ==
back to top

Designation			Discovery			Properties		Ref
Permanent	Provisional	Named after	Date	Site	Discoverer(s)	Category	Diam.	Ref
885201	2018 NG_{44}	—	July 12, 2018	Haleakala	Pan-STARRS 1	LIX	2.2 km	MPC · JPL
885202	2018 NZ_{49}	—	July 11, 2018	Haleakala	Pan-STARRS 1	·	580 m	MPC · JPL
885203	2018 NP_{61}	—	July 12, 2018	Haleakala	Pan-STARRS 1	VER	1.9 km	MPC · JPL
885204	2018 NL_{63}	—	July 9, 2018	Haleakala	Pan-STARRS 1	·	1.9 km	MPC · JPL
885205	2018 NB_{68}	—	July 10, 2018	Haleakala	Pan-STARRS 1	·	990 m	MPC · JPL
885206	2018 NH_{73}	—	July 8, 2018	Haleakala	Pan-STARRS 1	·	2.3 km	MPC · JPL
885207	2018 NQ_{73}	—	July 10, 2018	Haleakala	Pan-STARRS 1	·	2.0 km	MPC · JPL
885208	2018 ND_{74}	—	July 12, 2018	Haleakala	Pan-STARRS 2	·	2.4 km	MPC · JPL
885209	2018 NZ_{76}	—	July 8, 2018	Haleakala	Pan-STARRS 1	·	2.0 km	MPC · JPL
885210	2018 OL_{1}	—	June 13, 2018	Haleakala	Pan-STARRS 1	THB	1.9 km	MPC · JPL
885211	2018 OP_{2}	—	July 17, 2018	Haleakala	Pan-STARRS 2	THB	2.1 km	MPC · JPL
885212	2018 OT_{3}	—	March 28, 2016	Cerro Tololo	DECam	·	2.2 km	MPC · JPL
885213	2018 PO_{11}	—	September 18, 2011	Mount Lemmon	Mount Lemmon Survey	NYS	620 m	MPC · JPL
885214	2018 PJ_{12}	—	September 5, 2013	Piszkés-tető	K. Sárneczky, T. Csörgei	·	2.1 km	MPC · JPL
885215	2018 PP_{13}	—	August 5, 2018	Haleakala	Pan-STARRS 1	·	2.2 km	MPC · JPL
885216	2018 PF_{17}	—	August 7, 2018	Haleakala	Pan-STARRS 1	L4	5.5 km	MPC · JPL
885217	2018 PO_{17}	—	February 14, 2007	Mauna Kea	P. A. Wiegert	·	590 m	MPC · JPL
885218	2018 PE_{23}	—	September 12, 2005	Kitt Peak	Spacewatch	·	1.4 km	MPC · JPL
885219	2018 PL_{31}	—	January 7, 2016	Haleakala	Pan-STARRS 1	·	1.4 km	MPC · JPL
885220	2018 PH_{32}	—	August 5, 2018	Haleakala	Pan-STARRS 1	·	1.4 km	MPC · JPL
885221	2018 PR_{34}	—	May 6, 2016	Haleakala	Pan-STARRS 1	·	2.3 km	MPC · JPL
885222	2018 PH_{40}	—	August 8, 2018	Haleakala	Pan-STARRS 1	critical	460 m	MPC · JPL
885223	2018 PY_{40}	—	March 29, 2016	Cerro Tololo	DECam	·	2.2 km	MPC · JPL
885224	2018 PD_{41}	—	August 11, 2018	Haleakala	Pan-STARRS 1	·	1.5 km	MPC · JPL
885225	2018 PE_{41}	—	August 11, 2018	Haleakala	Pan-STARRS 1	ELF	2.3 km	MPC · JPL
885226	2018 PR_{41}	—	August 8, 2018	Haleakala	Pan-STARRS 1	T_{j} (2.97)	2.3 km	MPC · JPL
885227	2018 PW_{42}	—	August 5, 2018	Haleakala	Pan-STARRS 1	·	1.8 km	MPC · JPL
885228	2018 PC_{43}	—	February 11, 2016	Haleakala	Pan-STARRS 1	·	1.7 km	MPC · JPL
885229	2018 PE_{43}	—	July 8, 2018	Haleakala	Pan-STARRS 1	EOS	1.4 km	MPC · JPL
885230	2018 PN_{44}	—	August 7, 2018	Haleakala	Pan-STARRS 1	·	1.8 km	MPC · JPL
885231	2018 PD_{46}	—	January 18, 2015	Haleakala	Pan-STARRS 1	·	2.1 km	MPC · JPL
885232	2018 PK_{46}	—	August 8, 2018	Haleakala	Pan-STARRS 1	·	1.2 km	MPC · JPL
885233	2018 PV_{47}	—	August 7, 2018	Haleakala	Pan-STARRS 1	·	1.9 km	MPC · JPL
885234	2018 PH_{50}	—	October 25, 2013	Mount Lemmon	Mount Lemmon Survey	EOS	1.3 km	MPC · JPL
885235	2018 PD_{51}	—	August 8, 2018	Haleakala	Pan-STARRS 1	·	2.2 km	MPC · JPL
885236	2018 PY_{51}	—	March 28, 2016	Cerro Tololo	DECam	EOS	1.2 km	MPC · JPL
885237	2018 PL_{52}	—	August 6, 2018	Haleakala	Pan-STARRS 1	·	1.7 km	MPC · JPL
885238	2018 PD_{55}	—	January 19, 2015	Mount Lemmon	Mount Lemmon Survey	·	2.5 km	MPC · JPL
885239	2018 PL_{61}	—	August 8, 2018	Haleakala	Pan-STARRS 1	·	2.1 km	MPC · JPL
885240	2018 PB_{62}	—	August 14, 2018	Kitt Peak	Spacewatch	·	1.2 km	MPC · JPL
885241	2018 PG_{63}	—	August 8, 2018	Haleakala	Pan-STARRS 1	·	2.1 km	MPC · JPL
885242	2018 PZ_{63}	—	August 11, 2018	Haleakala	Pan-STARRS 1	TIR · critical	1.6 km	MPC · JPL
885243	2018 PB_{65}	—	August 11, 2018	Haleakala	Pan-STARRS 1	·	1.9 km	MPC · JPL
885244	2018 PJ_{65}	—	August 11, 2018	Haleakala	Pan-STARRS 1	·	2.2 km	MPC · JPL
885245	2018 PF_{67}	—	August 14, 2018	Haleakala	Pan-STARRS 1	·	1.9 km	MPC · JPL
885246	2018 PG_{69}	—	August 12, 2018	Haleakala	Pan-STARRS 1	·	2.1 km	MPC · JPL
885247	2018 PQ_{69}	—	August 13, 2018	Haleakala	Pan-STARRS 1	·	2.3 km	MPC · JPL
885248	2018 PN_{77}	—	August 24, 2001	Kitt Peak	Spacewatch	THM	1.5 km	MPC · JPL
885249	2018 PQ_{80}	—	January 20, 2015	Haleakala	Pan-STARRS 1	·	2.8 km	MPC · JPL
885250	2018 PN_{89}	—	May 23, 2006	Kitt Peak	Spacewatch	·	2.0 km	MPC · JPL
885251	2018 PT_{95}	—	August 8, 2018	Haleakala	Pan-STARRS 1	·	460 m	MPC · JPL
885252	2018 PO_{138}	—	August 12, 2018	Haleakala	Pan-STARRS 1	·	2.3 km	MPC · JPL
885253	2018 PV_{150}	—	August 6, 2018	Haleakala	Pan-STARRS 1	·	2.6 km	MPC · JPL
885254	2018 PV_{154}	—	March 30, 2016	Cerro Tololo	DECam	·	1.6 km	MPC · JPL
885255	2018 QD_{2}	—	January 16, 2015	Haleakala	Pan-STARRS 1	·	2.2 km	MPC · JPL
885256	2018 QN_{5}	—	January 20, 2015	Haleakala	Pan-STARRS 1	·	2.2 km	MPC · JPL
885257	2018 QP_{7}	—	August 22, 2004	Kitt Peak	Spacewatch	·	1.3 km	MPC · JPL
885258	2018 QJ_{8}	—	August 18, 2018	Haleakala	Pan-STARRS 1	·	1.6 km	MPC · JPL
885259	2018 QL_{8}	—	August 18, 2018	Haleakala	Pan-STARRS 1	·	1.9 km	MPC · JPL
885260	2018 QU_{8}	—	July 12, 2018	Haleakala	Pan-STARRS 1	·	480 m	MPC · JPL
885261	2018 QL_{11}	—	August 17, 2018	Haleakala	Pan-STARRS 1	·	2.4 km	MPC · JPL
885262	2018 QL_{12}	—	August 18, 2018	Haleakala	Pan-STARRS 1	·	580 m	MPC · JPL
885263	2018 QO_{13}	—	August 18, 2018	Haleakala	Pan-STARRS 1	THB	1.8 km	MPC · JPL
885264	2018 QD_{14}	—	August 18, 2018	Haleakala	Pan-STARRS 1	·	2.0 km	MPC · JPL
885265	2018 QY_{14}	—	January 19, 2015	Mount Lemmon	Mount Lemmon Survey	VER	2.0 km	MPC · JPL
885266	2018 QK_{15}	—	March 29, 2016	Cerro Tololo	DECam	·	2.2 km	MPC · JPL
885267	2018 QW_{19}	—	March 29, 2016	Cerro Tololo	DECam	·	2.0 km	MPC · JPL
885268	2018 RP_{8}	—	September 15, 2018	Haleakala	ATLAS	ATE	390 m	MPC · JPL
885269	2018 RV_{8}	—	October 27, 2012	Mount Lemmon	Mount Lemmon Survey	·	650 m	MPC · JPL
885270	2018 RF_{9}	—	December 10, 2015	Haleakala	Pan-STARRS 1	·	470 m	MPC · JPL
885271	2018 RW_{11}	—	August 14, 2018	XuYi	PMO NEO Survey Program	TIR	2.0 km	MPC · JPL
885272	2018 RL_{14}	—	August 31, 2011	Haleakala	Pan-STARRS 1	·	550 m	MPC · JPL
885273	2018 RE_{16}	—	December 1, 2014	Haleakala	Pan-STARRS 1	·	2.1 km	MPC · JPL
885274	2018 RO_{19}	—	October 28, 2014	Haleakala	Pan-STARRS 1	·	810 m	MPC · JPL
885275	2018 RO_{22}	—	September 23, 2008	Kitt Peak	Spacewatch	·	540 m	MPC · JPL
885276	2018 RA_{25}	—	May 22, 2017	Haleakala	Pan-STARRS 1	·	2.1 km	MPC · JPL
885277	2018 RK_{27}	—	September 15, 2009	Kitt Peak	Spacewatch	·	1.5 km	MPC · JPL
885278	2018 RJ_{28}	—	May 21, 2018	Mount Lemmon	Mount Lemmon Survey	T_{j} (2.94)	2.2 km	MPC · JPL
885279	2018 RQ_{29}	—	September 23, 2015	Haleakala	Pan-STARRS 1	·	530 m	MPC · JPL
885280	2018 RT_{30}	—	April 24, 2014	Cerro Tololo	DECam	·	440 m	MPC · JPL
885281	2018 RW_{30}	—	August 21, 2008	Kitt Peak	Spacewatch	·	610 m	MPC · JPL
885282	2018 RS_{36}	—	August 23, 2011	Andrushivka	Y. Ivaščenko, Kyrylenko, P.	·	450 m	MPC · JPL
885283	2018 RQ_{37}	—	September 9, 2015	Haleakala	Pan-STARRS 1	·	710 m	MPC · JPL
885284	2018 RF_{38}	—	July 29, 2018	Haleakala	Pan-STARRS 1	T_{j} (2.99) · critical	2.3 km	MPC · JPL
885285	2018 RL_{43}	—	August 29, 2014	Mount Lemmon	Mount Lemmon Survey	·	1.1 km	MPC · JPL
885286	2018 RY_{46}	—	September 12, 2018	Mount Lemmon	Mount Lemmon Survey	EUN	750 m	MPC · JPL
885287	2018 RT_{47}	—	September 12, 2018	Mount Lemmon	Mount Lemmon Survey	·	2.3 km	MPC · JPL
885288	2018 RV_{47}	—	September 12, 2018	Mount Lemmon	Mount Lemmon Survey	·	380 m	MPC · JPL
885289	2018 RZ_{47}	—	September 7, 2018	Mount Lemmon	Mount Lemmon Survey	·	560 m	MPC · JPL
885290	2018 RU_{49}	—	September 10, 2018	Mount Lemmon	Mount Lemmon Survey	·	680 m	MPC · JPL
885291	2018 RN_{53}	—	September 15, 2018	Mount Lemmon	Mount Lemmon Survey	·	2.6 km	MPC · JPL
885292	2018 RX_{53}	—	November 11, 2013	Mount Lemmon	Mount Lemmon Survey	THB	2.0 km	MPC · JPL
885293	2018 RK_{58}	—	September 11, 2018	Mount Lemmon	Mount Lemmon Survey	(5)	660 m	MPC · JPL
885294	2018 RQ_{58}	—	September 6, 2018	Mount Lemmon	Mount Lemmon Survey	·	2.3 km	MPC · JPL
885295	2018 RG_{59}	—	September 11, 2018	Mount Lemmon	Mount Lemmon Survey	·	750 m	MPC · JPL
885296	2018 RJ_{59}	—	September 12, 2018	Mount Lemmon	Mount Lemmon Survey	·	2.0 km	MPC · JPL
885297	2018 RB_{61}	—	September 12, 2018	Mount Lemmon	Mount Lemmon Survey	·	520 m	MPC · JPL
885298	2018 RS_{63}	—	September 12, 2018	Mount Lemmon	Mount Lemmon Survey	·	2.3 km	MPC · JPL
885299	2018 RT_{63}	—	August 15, 2018	Haleakala	Pan-STARRS 1	·	620 m	MPC · JPL
885300	2018 RZ_{63}	—	September 12, 2018	Mount Lemmon	Mount Lemmon Survey	·	900 m	MPC · JPL

== 885301–885400 ==
back to top

Designation			Discovery			Properties		Ref
Permanent	Provisional	Named after	Date	Site	Discoverer(s)	Category	Diam.	Ref
885301	2018 RV_{65}	—	September 11, 2018	Mount Lemmon	Mount Lemmon Survey	·	2.0 km	MPC · JPL
885302	2018 RA_{66}	—	September 8, 2018	Mount Lemmon	Mount Lemmon Survey	·	2.4 km	MPC · JPL
885303	2018 RC_{66}	—	September 9, 2018	Mount Lemmon	Mount Lemmon Survey	·	2.2 km	MPC · JPL
885304	2018 RQ_{70}	—	September 12, 2018	Mount Lemmon	Mount Lemmon Survey	·	720 m	MPC · JPL
885305	2018 RL_{75}	—	September 12, 2018	Mount Lemmon	Mount Lemmon Survey	·	990 m	MPC · JPL
885306	2018 RH_{76}	—	September 15, 2018	Mount Lemmon	Mount Lemmon Survey	·	2.5 km	MPC · JPL
885307	2018 RY_{127}	—	September 6, 2018	Mount Lemmon	Mount Lemmon Survey	·	2.5 km	MPC · JPL
885308	2018 RW_{130}	—	September 9, 2018	Mount Lemmon	Mount Lemmon Survey	·	2.2 km	MPC · JPL
885309	2018 RY_{130}	—	September 15, 2018	Mount Lemmon	Mount Lemmon Survey	·	2.3 km	MPC · JPL
885310	2018 RE_{131}	—	September 7, 2018	Mount Lemmon	Mount Lemmon Survey	·	2.1 km	MPC · JPL
885311	2018 RK_{131}	—	September 8, 2018	Mount Lemmon	Mount Lemmon Survey	T_{j} (2.97)	1.6 km	MPC · JPL
885312	2018 SV_{7}	—	January 18, 2015	Mount Lemmon	Mount Lemmon Survey	EUP	3.0 km	MPC · JPL
885313	2018 SX_{9}	—	July 16, 2018	Haleakala	Pan-STARRS 2	·	1.4 km	MPC · JPL
885314	2018 SN_{10}	—	November 22, 2014	Haleakala	Pan-STARRS 1	·	1.3 km	MPC · JPL
885315	2018 SD_{12}	—	October 1, 2011	Kitt Peak	Spacewatch	·	650 m	MPC · JPL
885316	2018 SW_{17}	—	September 21, 2018	Mount Lemmon	Mount Lemmon Survey	·	2.6 km	MPC · JPL
885317	2018 SD_{18}	—	August 26, 2012	Haleakala	Pan-STARRS 1	T_{j} (2.99) · EUP	2.4 km	MPC · JPL
885318	2018 SZ_{21}	—	September 22, 2018	Mount Lemmon	Mount Lemmon Survey	H	480 m	MPC · JPL
885319	2018 SL_{22}	—	September 12, 2018	Mount Lemmon	Mount Lemmon Survey	·	2.2 km	MPC · JPL
885320	2018 SR_{26}	—	September 30, 2018	Mount Lemmon	Mount Lemmon Survey	·	2.0 km	MPC · JPL
885321	2018 SV_{27}	—	September 16, 2018	Mount Lemmon	Mount Lemmon Survey	·	2.7 km	MPC · JPL
885322	2018 TY_{2}	—	October 5, 2018	Mount Lemmon	Mount Lemmon Survey	T_{j} (2.99) · APO · PHA	550 m	MPC · JPL
885323	2018 TU_{5}	—	October 10, 2018	Haleakala	ATLAS	·	660 m	MPC · JPL
885324	2018 TN_{11}	—	September 21, 2011	Mount Lemmon	Mount Lemmon Survey	·	480 m	MPC · JPL
885325	2018 TN_{14}	—	November 1, 2005	Mount Lemmon	Mount Lemmon Survey	·	1.3 km	MPC · JPL
885326	2018 TN_{16}	—	September 12, 2018	Mount Lemmon	Mount Lemmon Survey	H	360 m	MPC · JPL
885327	2018 TJ_{19}	—	October 5, 2018	Haleakala	Pan-STARRS 2	·	2.6 km	MPC · JPL
885328	2018 TZ_{21}	—	October 5, 2018	Mount Lemmon	Mount Lemmon Survey	·	600 m	MPC · JPL
885329	2018 TV_{33}	—	October 5, 2018	Mount Lemmon	Mount Lemmon Survey	·	2.2 km	MPC · JPL
885330	2018 TW_{42}	—	April 22, 2014	Cerro Tololo-DECam	DECam	·	430 m	MPC · JPL
885331	2018 TF_{44}	—	October 5, 2018	Mount Lemmon	Mount Lemmon Survey	·	2.1 km	MPC · JPL
885332	2018 TW_{44}	—	April 22, 2014	Cerro Tololo	DECam	·	380 m	MPC · JPL
885333	2018 TO_{51}	—	November 2, 2007	Mount Lemmon	Mount Lemmon Survey	·	2.1 km	MPC · JPL
885334	2018 TS_{51}	—	October 4, 2018	Haleakala	Pan-STARRS 2	·	2.3 km	MPC · JPL
885335	2018 TM_{62}	—	October 4, 2018	Haleakala	Pan-STARRS 2	·	1.1 km	MPC · JPL
885336	2018 TN_{81}	—	October 4, 2018	Haleakala	Pan-STARRS 2	·	2.3 km	MPC · JPL
885337	2018 UQ	—	October 16, 2018	Haleakala	Pan-STARRS 2	·	410 m	MPC · JPL
885338	2018 UN_{14}	—	September 27, 2000	Socorro	LINEAR	·	930 m	MPC · JPL
885339	2018 UD_{17}	—	September 25, 2011	Haleakala	Pan-STARRS 1	·	530 m	MPC · JPL
885340	2018 UL_{17}	—	October 28, 2013	Catalina	CSS	critical	1.3 km	MPC · JPL
885341	2018 UW_{21}	—	October 17, 2018	Haleakala	Pan-STARRS 2	·	1.6 km	MPC · JPL
885342	2018 UP_{24}	—	October 18, 2018	Mount Lemmon	Mount Lemmon Survey	·	1.2 km	MPC · JPL
885343	2018 UE_{26}	—	November 2, 2013	Mount Lemmon	Mount Lemmon Survey	·	2.0 km	MPC · JPL
885344	2018 UY_{31}	—	October 18, 2018	Mount Lemmon	Mount Lemmon Survey	·	660 m	MPC · JPL
885345	2018 UO_{35}	—	May 7, 2014	Haleakala	Pan-STARRS 1	·	510 m	MPC · JPL
885346	2018 VE_{1}	—	April 17, 2015	Mount Lemmon	Mount Lemmon Survey	·	350 m	MPC · JPL
885347	2018 VB_{4}	—	November 6, 2018	Haleakala	Pan-STARRS 2	APO	200 m	MPC · JPL
885348	2018 VA_{11}	—	September 9, 2018	Mount Lemmon	Mount Lemmon Survey	EUP	2.5 km	MPC · JPL
885349	2018 VM_{16}	—	October 15, 2001	Palomar	NEAT	·	750 m	MPC · JPL
885350	2018 VF_{38}	—	November 8, 2013	Kitt Peak	Spacewatch	·	1.4 km	MPC · JPL
885351	2018 VK_{58}	—	March 19, 2017	Haleakala	Pan-STARRS 1	·	690 m	MPC · JPL
885352	2018 VO_{66}	—	October 10, 2018	Mount Lemmon	Mount Lemmon Survey	·	740 m	MPC · JPL
885353	2018 VY_{66}	—	November 21, 2008	Kitt Peak	Spacewatch	·	460 m	MPC · JPL
885354	2018 VZ_{70}	—	April 27, 2017	Haleakala	Pan-STARRS 1	H	380 m	MPC · JPL
885355	2018 VM_{83}	—	October 25, 2009	Mount Lemmon	Mount Lemmon Survey	DOR	1.6 km	MPC · JPL
885356	2018 VJ_{96}	—	October 25, 2011	Haleakala	Pan-STARRS 1	·	580 m	MPC · JPL
885357	2018 VD_{112}	—	May 16, 2013	Mount Lemmon	Mount Lemmon Survey	(5)	1.2 km	MPC · JPL
885358	2018 VT_{112}	—	November 1, 2018	Haleakala	Pan-STARRS 2	·	1.0 km	MPC · JPL
885359	2018 VW_{113}	—	March 28, 2016	Cerro Tololo	DECam	·	580 m	MPC · JPL
885360	2018 VS_{115}	—	November 2, 2018	Haleakala	Pan-STARRS 2	·	1.6 km	MPC · JPL
885361	2018 VJ_{117}	—	November 6, 2018	Mount Lemmon	Mount Lemmon Survey	·	1.2 km	MPC · JPL
885362	2018 VO_{123}	—	November 5, 2018	Haleakala	Pan-STARRS 2	·	1.4 km	MPC · JPL
885363	2018 VR_{136}	—	November 9, 2018	Mount Lemmon	Mount Lemmon Survey	·	1.2 km	MPC · JPL
885364	2018 VF_{141}	—	March 29, 2016	Cerro Tololo	DECam	GEF	900 m	MPC · JPL
885365	2018 VG_{144}	—	November 3, 2018	Mount Lemmon	Mount Lemmon Survey	·	1.8 km	MPC · JPL
885366	2018 VT_{147}	—	January 17, 2015	Mount Lemmon	Mount Lemmon Survey	·	1.2 km	MPC · JPL
885367	2018 VO_{180}	—	November 10, 2018	Haleakala	Pan-STARRS 2	H	320 m	MPC · JPL
885368	2018 WH_{3}	—	December 2, 2004	Catalina	CSS	PHO	790 m	MPC · JPL
885369	2018 WK_{17}	—	November 17, 2018	Mount Lemmon	Mount Lemmon Survey	·	1.2 km	MPC · JPL
885370	2018 WX_{18}	—	November 17, 2018	Mount Lemmon	Mount Lemmon Survey	·	1.3 km	MPC · JPL
885371	2018 XJ_{20}	—	April 21, 2015	Haleakala	Pan-STARRS 1	·	1.0 km	MPC · JPL
885372	2018 XB_{22}	—	December 4, 2018	Mount Lemmon	Mount Lemmon Survey	·	1.3 km	MPC · JPL
885373	2018 XS_{42}	—	December 14, 2018	Haleakala	Pan-STARRS 1	·	640 m	MPC · JPL
885374	2018 XD_{44}	—	December 12, 2018	Haleakala	Pan-STARRS 1	·	1.5 km	MPC · JPL
885375	2018 XG_{47}	—	December 14, 2018	Haleakala	Pan-STARRS 1	·	1.6 km	MPC · JPL
885376	2018 YJ	—	December 16, 2018	Mount Lemmon	Mount Lemmon Survey	AMO	730 m	MPC · JPL
885377	2018 YU	—	December 16, 2018	Haleakala	Pan-STARRS 1	APO	400 m	MPC · JPL
885378	2018 YN_{1}	—	November 10, 2018	Mount Lemmon	Mount Lemmon Survey	·	1.1 km	MPC · JPL
885379	2018 YL_{5}	—	March 4, 2016	Haleakala	Pan-STARRS 1	·	510 m	MPC · JPL
885380	2018 YC_{15}	—	December 17, 2018	Haleakala	Pan-STARRS 1	RAF	670 m	MPC · JPL
885381	2018 YQ_{23}	—	December 17, 2018	Haleakala	Pan-STARRS 1	·	1.9 km	MPC · JPL
885382	2018 YS_{23}	—	December 31, 2018	Haleakala	Pan-STARRS 1	critical	1.7 km	MPC · JPL
885383	2018 YC_{24}	—	December 31, 2018	Haleakala	Pan-STARRS 1	·	2.0 km	MPC · JPL
885384	2018 YO_{27}	—	December 31, 2018	Haleakala	Pan-STARRS 1	·	1.7 km	MPC · JPL
885385	2019 AX_{7}	—	March 1, 2010	WISE	WISE	·	1.8 km	MPC · JPL
885386	2019 AT_{8}	—	December 6, 2015	Haleakala	Pan-STARRS 1	H	320 m	MPC · JPL
885387	2019 AB_{14}	—	September 20, 2012	Westfield	International Astronomical Search Collaboration	H	410 m	MPC · JPL
885388	2019 AB_{15}	—	October 21, 2018	Mount Lemmon	Mount Lemmon Survey	PHO	820 m	MPC · JPL
885389	2019 AP_{16}	—	February 5, 2016	Haleakala	Pan-STARRS 1	PHO	700 m	MPC · JPL
885390	2019 AK_{25}	—	June 5, 2010	WISE	WISE	·	2.5 km	MPC · JPL
885391	2019 AT_{27}	—	January 23, 2006	Catalina	CSS	·	1.8 km	MPC · JPL
885392	2019 AE_{29}	—	March 1, 2011	Mount Lemmon	Mount Lemmon Survey	·	950 m	MPC · JPL
885393	2019 AZ_{30}	—	November 19, 2018	Haleakala	Pan-STARRS 2	·	1.7 km	MPC · JPL
885394	2019 AF_{38}	—	November 4, 2007	Kitt Peak	Spacewatch	·	630 m	MPC · JPL
885395	2019 AL_{38}	—	July 28, 2011	Haleakala	Pan-STARRS 1	EOS	1.3 km	MPC · JPL
885396	2019 AZ_{42}	—	January 25, 2012	Haleakala	Pan-STARRS 1	·	770 m	MPC · JPL
885397	2019 AS_{44}	—	January 11, 2019	Haleakala	Pan-STARRS 1	·	1.1 km	MPC · JPL
885398	2019 AH_{45}	—	October 9, 2007	Mount Lemmon	Mount Lemmon Survey	·	1.6 km	MPC · JPL
885399	2019 AG_{47}	—	January 12, 2019	Haleakala	Pan-STARRS 1	·	1.2 km	MPC · JPL
885400	2019 AM_{49}	—	January 8, 2019	Haleakala	Pan-STARRS 1	·	2.0 km	MPC · JPL

== 885401–885500 ==
back to top

Designation			Discovery			Properties		Ref
Permanent	Provisional	Named after	Date	Site	Discoverer(s)	Category	Diam.	Ref
885401	2019 AY_{59}	—	January 10, 2019	Haleakala	Pan-STARRS 1	EOS	1.1 km	MPC · JPL
885402	2019 AZ_{74}	—	December 1, 2008	Kitt Peak	Spacewatch	·	1.4 km	MPC · JPL
885403	2019 AS_{78}	—	August 16, 2017	Haleakala	Pan-STARRS 1	LIX	1.8 km	MPC · JPL
885404	2019 AY_{86}	—	January 14, 2019	Haleakala	Pan-STARRS 1	·	1 km	MPC · JPL
885405	2019 AQ_{91}	—	January 7, 2019	Haleakala	Pan-STARRS 1	·	840 m	MPC · JPL
885406	2019 BF_{6}	—	December 28, 2011	Mount Lemmon	Mount Lemmon Survey	·	530 m	MPC · JPL
885407	2019 BN_{9}	—	January 28, 2019	Mount Lemmon	Mount Lemmon Survey	H	340 m	MPC · JPL
885408	2019 BR_{10}	—	January 27, 2019	Mount Lemmon	Mount Lemmon Survey	H	310 m	MPC · JPL
885409	2019 BB_{11}	—	April 18, 2015	Cerro Tololo	DECam	·	1.0 km	MPC · JPL
885410	2019 CP	—	February 5, 2019	Haleakala	Pan-STARRS 2	·	360 m	MPC · JPL
885411	2019 CQ_{11}	—	February 4, 2019	Haleakala	Pan-STARRS 1	·	1.2 km	MPC · JPL
885412	2019 CW_{11}	—	February 4, 2019	Haleakala	Pan-STARRS 1	·	2.3 km	MPC · JPL
885413	2019 CD_{14}	—	February 8, 2019	Palomar Mountain	Zwicky Transient Facility	·	2.0 km	MPC · JPL
885414	2019 CV_{14}	—	February 4, 2019	Haleakala	Pan-STARRS 1	H	250 m	MPC · JPL
885415	2019 CT_{18}	—	September 9, 2016	Bergisch Gladbach	W. Bickel	·	2.2 km	MPC · JPL
885416	2019 CE_{21}	—	January 16, 2015	Haleakala	Pan-STARRS 1	·	930 m	MPC · JPL
885417	2019 CU_{23}	—	February 5, 2019	Haleakala	Pan-STARRS 1	L5	6.3 km	MPC · JPL
885418	2019 EX_{1}	—	September 19, 2015	Haleakala	Pan-STARRS 1	H	310 m	MPC · JPL
885419	2019 EZ_{5}	—	March 27, 2015	Haleakala	Pan-STARRS 1	·	1.1 km	MPC · JPL
885420	2019 FW_{4}	—	March 28, 2019	Sutherland	P. Craig, B. Lewis	·	2.0 km	MPC · JPL
885421	2019 FK_{6}	—	May 14, 2015	Haleakala	Pan-STARRS 2	·	910 m	MPC · JPL
885422	2019 FD_{8}	—	March 31, 2019	Mount Lemmon	Mount Lemmon Survey	·	1.2 km	MPC · JPL
885423	2019 FH_{8}	—	September 20, 2011	Mount Lemmon	Mount Lemmon Survey	·	1.0 km	MPC · JPL
885424	2019 FM_{10}	—	March 29, 2019	Mount Lemmon	Mount Lemmon Survey	·	1.4 km	MPC · JPL
885425	2019 FQ_{18}	—	March 29, 2019	Mount Lemmon	Mount Lemmon Survey	·	1.3 km	MPC · JPL
885426	2019 FW_{20}	—	March 29, 2019	Mount Lemmon	Mount Lemmon Survey	·	790 m	MPC · JPL
885427	2019 FJ_{22}	—	March 29, 2019	Mount Lemmon	Mount Lemmon Survey	·	1.1 km	MPC · JPL
885428	2019 FW_{25}	—	March 29, 2019	Mount Lemmon	Mount Lemmon Survey	·	1.3 km	MPC · JPL
885429	2019 FP_{28}	—	March 29, 2019	Mount Lemmon	Mount Lemmon Survey	·	970 m	MPC · JPL
885430	2019 FR_{29}	—	April 20, 2015	Haleakala	Pan-STARRS 1	·	1.1 km	MPC · JPL
885431	2019 FD_{35}	—	March 31, 2019	Mount Lemmon	Mount Lemmon Survey	L5	6.8 km	MPC · JPL
885432	2019 GY_{6}	—	January 6, 2012	Haleakala	Pan-STARRS 1	·	780 m	MPC · JPL
885433	2019 GD_{17}	—	August 30, 2016	Mount Lemmon	Mount Lemmon Survey	·	1.3 km	MPC · JPL
885434	2019 GN_{17}	—	April 5, 2019	Haleakala	Pan-STARRS 1	·	890 m	MPC · JPL
885435	2019 GP_{22}	—	October 16, 2017	Mount Lemmon	Mount Lemmon Survey	PHO	700 m	MPC · JPL
885436	2019 GG_{24}	—	April 3, 2019	Haleakala	Pan-STARRS 1	·	1.3 km	MPC · JPL
885437	2019 GL_{25}	—	April 2, 2019	Haleakala	Pan-STARRS 1	·	750 m	MPC · JPL
885438	2019 GH_{26}	—	April 5, 2019	Haleakala	Pan-STARRS 1	·	1.1 km	MPC · JPL
885439	2019 GS_{26}	—	April 3, 2019	Haleakala	Pan-STARRS 1	·	1.4 km	MPC · JPL
885440	2019 GU_{28}	—	April 2, 2019	Haleakala	Pan-STARRS 1	·	930 m	MPC · JPL
885441	2019 GX_{28}	—	March 24, 2015	Mount Lemmon	Mount Lemmon Survey	HNS	710 m	MPC · JPL
885442	2019 GU_{29}	—	April 8, 2019	Haleakala	Pan-STARRS 1	·	1.6 km	MPC · JPL
885443	2019 GJ_{31}	—	April 3, 2019	Haleakala	Pan-STARRS 1	·	1.1 km	MPC · JPL
885444	2019 GM_{31}	—	May 25, 2015	Haleakala	Pan-STARRS 1	·	1.2 km	MPC · JPL
885445	2019 GE_{32}	—	August 21, 2015	Haleakala	Pan-STARRS 1	·	1.5 km	MPC · JPL
885446	2019 GJ_{36}	—	April 4, 2019	Haleakala	Pan-STARRS 1	·	1.3 km	MPC · JPL
885447	2019 GL_{40}	—	April 3, 2019	Haleakala	Pan-STARRS 1	·	1.4 km	MPC · JPL
885448	2019 GE_{46}	—	April 3, 2019	Haleakala	Pan-STARRS 1	EUN	810 m	MPC · JPL
885449	2019 GH_{46}	—	May 21, 2015	Cerro Tololo	DECam	·	1 km	MPC · JPL
885450	2019 GN_{48}	—	May 21, 2015	Haleakala	Pan-STARRS 1	·	830 m	MPC · JPL
885451	2019 GV_{51}	—	April 9, 2019	Haleakala	Pan-STARRS 1	·	1.2 km	MPC · JPL
885452	2019 GR_{54}	—	April 6, 2019	Haleakala	Pan-STARRS 1	HNS	920 m	MPC · JPL
885453	2019 GG_{58}	—	April 3, 2019	Haleakala	Pan-STARRS 1	·	790 m	MPC · JPL
885454	2019 GD_{60}	—	April 3, 2019	Haleakala	Pan-STARRS 1	L5	7.0 km	MPC · JPL
885455	2019 GY_{60}	—	April 3, 2019	Haleakala	Pan-STARRS 1	L5	5.3 km	MPC · JPL
885456	2019 GG_{63}	—	June 19, 2015	Haleakala	Pan-STARRS 1	·	1.6 km	MPC · JPL
885457	2019 GE_{65}	—	April 2, 2019	Haleakala	Pan-STARRS 1	·	1.3 km	MPC · JPL
885458	2019 GZ_{66}	—	April 3, 2019	Haleakala	Pan-STARRS 1	·	1.1 km	MPC · JPL
885459	2019 GO_{67}	—	April 8, 2019	Haleakala	Pan-STARRS 1	GEF	830 m	MPC · JPL
885460	2019 GT_{67}	—	April 4, 2019	Haleakala	Pan-STARRS 1	·	1.5 km	MPC · JPL
885461	2019 GZ_{68}	—	April 2, 2019	Haleakala	Pan-STARRS 1	·	1.2 km	MPC · JPL
885462	2019 GE_{69}	—	April 3, 2019	Haleakala	Pan-STARRS 1	·	1.1 km	MPC · JPL
885463	2019 GH_{70}	—	April 2, 2019	Cerro Tololo	DECam	·	990 m	MPC · JPL
885464	2019 GJ_{70}	—	April 2, 2019	Haleakala	Pan-STARRS 1	·	1.2 km	MPC · JPL
885465	2019 GQ_{70}	—	April 6, 2019	Haleakala	Pan-STARRS 1	·	1.2 km	MPC · JPL
885466	2019 GP_{71}	—	April 5, 2019	Haleakala	Pan-STARRS 1	L5	5.8 km	MPC · JPL
885467	2019 GV_{72}	—	April 5, 2019	Haleakala	Pan-STARRS 1	·	900 m	MPC · JPL
885468	2019 GS_{73}	—	May 13, 2015	Mount Lemmon	Mount Lemmon Survey	·	960 m	MPC · JPL
885469	2019 GQ_{74}	—	April 7, 2019	Haleakala	Pan-STARRS 1	EUN	1.0 km	MPC · JPL
885470	2019 GF_{75}	—	April 7, 2019	Haleakala	Pan-STARRS 1	L5	6.7 km	MPC · JPL
885471	2019 GT_{77}	—	April 18, 2015	Cerro Tololo	DECam	·	690 m	MPC · JPL
885472	2019 GM_{80}	—	June 8, 2015	Haleakala	Pan-STARRS 1	·	1.1 km	MPC · JPL
885473	2019 GE_{81}	—	April 2, 2019	Kitt Peak	Spacewatch	EUN	720 m	MPC · JPL
885474	2019 GG_{82}	—	April 3, 2019	Haleakala	Pan-STARRS 1	·	940 m	MPC · JPL
885475	2019 GL_{82}	—	April 4, 2019	Haleakala	Pan-STARRS 1	EUN	750 m	MPC · JPL
885476	2019 GS_{86}	—	April 2, 2019	Haleakala	Pan-STARRS 1	·	1.1 km	MPC · JPL
885477	2019 GF_{92}	—	April 14, 2019	Mount Lemmon	Mount Lemmon Survey	H	370 m	MPC · JPL
885478	2019 GG_{108}	—	April 3, 2019	Haleakala	Pan-STARRS 1	·	940 m	MPC · JPL
885479	2019 GR_{124}	—	April 3, 2019	Haleakala	Pan-STARRS 1	·	950 m	MPC · JPL
885480	2019 GN_{125}	—	April 7, 2019	Haleakala	Pan-STARRS 1	MAR	890 m	MPC · JPL
885481	2019 GZ_{128}	—	April 18, 2015	Cerro Tololo	DECam	·	820 m	MPC · JPL
885482	2019 GS_{129}	—	April 18, 2015	Cerro Tololo	DECam	·	1.0 km	MPC · JPL
885483	2019 GF_{130}	—	January 11, 2019	Haleakala	Pan-STARRS 1	·	1.1 km	MPC · JPL
885484	2019 GG_{144}	—	April 3, 2019	Haleakala	Pan-STARRS 1	L5	5.6 km	MPC · JPL
885485	2019 GC_{155}	—	April 2, 2019	Cerro Tololo	DECam	·	980 m	MPC · JPL
885486	2019 GG_{171}	—	April 5, 2019	Haleakala	Pan-STARRS 1	L5	7.4 km	MPC · JPL
885487	2019 GX_{172}	—	April 5, 2019	Haleakala	Pan-STARRS 1	3:2	3.6 km	MPC · JPL
885488	2019 GL_{173}	—	April 8, 2019	Haleakala	Pan-STARRS 1	L5	6.6 km	MPC · JPL
885489	2019 GR_{196}	—	April 5, 2019	Haleakala	Pan-STARRS 1	L5	6.7 km	MPC · JPL
885490	2019 HU_{1}	—	May 21, 2015	Haleakala	Pan-STARRS 1	·	1.1 km	MPC · JPL
885491	2019 HV_{1}	—	May 5, 2008	Mount Lemmon	Mount Lemmon Survey	T_{j} (2.96)	2.0 km	MPC · JPL
885492	2019 HZ_{5}	—	April 26, 2019	Mount Lemmon	Mount Lemmon Survey	BRG	1.1 km	MPC · JPL
885493	2019 HD_{7}	—	April 26, 2019	Kitt Peak	Spacewatch	·	1.2 km	MPC · JPL
885494	2019 HT_{8}	—	April 26, 2019	Mount Lemmon	Mount Lemmon Survey	·	900 m	MPC · JPL
885495	2019 HO_{9}	—	April 26, 2019	Mount Lemmon	Mount Lemmon Survey	·	1.2 km	MPC · JPL
885496	2019 HR_{9}	—	April 23, 2015	Haleakala	Pan-STARRS 1	·	790 m	MPC · JPL
885497	2019 JA_{2}	—	September 19, 2012	Mount Lemmon	Mount Lemmon Survey	H	260 m	MPC · JPL
885498	2019 JB_{3}	—	September 30, 2017	Mount Lemmon	Mount Lemmon Survey	H	330 m	MPC · JPL
885499	2019 JV_{8}	—	April 5, 2019	Haleakala	Pan-STARRS 1	H	310 m	MPC · JPL
885500	2019 JW_{9}	—	March 30, 2015	Haleakala	Pan-STARRS 1	·	770 m	MPC · JPL

== 885501–885600 ==
back to top

Designation			Discovery			Properties		Ref
Permanent	Provisional	Named after	Date	Site	Discoverer(s)	Category	Diam.	Ref
885501	2019 JX_{10}	—	June 20, 2015	Haleakala	Pan-STARRS 1	·	1.3 km	MPC · JPL
885502	2019 JT_{12}	—	May 1, 2019	Mount Lemmon	Mount Lemmon Survey	MAR	800 m	MPC · JPL
885503	2019 JV_{14}	—	November 28, 2013	Mount Lemmon	Mount Lemmon Survey	·	710 m	MPC · JPL
885504	2019 JP_{15}	—	May 1, 2019	Haleakala	Pan-STARRS 1	·	1.1 km	MPC · JPL
885505	2019 JN_{20}	—	October 12, 2016	Haleakala	Pan-STARRS 1	·	1.1 km	MPC · JPL
885506	2019 JS_{23}	—	September 14, 2007	Mount Lemmon	Mount Lemmon Survey	·	1.1 km	MPC · JPL
885507	2019 JA_{24}	—	August 2, 2016	Haleakala	Pan-STARRS 1	·	860 m	MPC · JPL
885508	2019 JW_{27}	—	May 20, 2015	Cerro Tololo	DECam	·	1.1 km	MPC · JPL
885509	2019 JK_{30}	—	June 12, 2015	Mount Lemmon	Mount Lemmon Survey	·	1.3 km	MPC · JPL
885510	2019 JF_{36}	—	March 11, 2014	Mount Lemmon	Mount Lemmon Survey	·	1.4 km	MPC · JPL
885511	2019 JA_{43}	—	December 31, 2013	Mount Lemmon	Mount Lemmon Survey	EUN	810 m	MPC · JPL
885512	2019 JU_{44}	—	April 25, 2015	Haleakala	Pan-STARRS 1	·	680 m	MPC · JPL
885513	2019 JG_{46}	—	April 6, 2019	Haleakala	Pan-STARRS 1	·	1.0 km	MPC · JPL
885514	2019 JK_{47}	—	May 8, 2019	Haleakala	Pan-STARRS 1	·	2.2 km	MPC · JPL
885515	2019 JQ_{47}	—	May 1, 2019	Haleakala	Pan-STARRS 1	H	400 m	MPC · JPL
885516	2019 JC_{48}	—	May 1, 2019	Haleakala	Pan-STARRS 1	·	1.0 km	MPC · JPL
885517	2019 JK_{48}	—	January 25, 2006	Kitt Peak	Spacewatch	·	850 m	MPC · JPL
885518	2019 JY_{49}	—	May 14, 2019	Mount Lemmon	Mount Lemmon Survey	·	1.1 km	MPC · JPL
885519	2019 JQ_{51}	—	April 6, 2019	Haleakala	Pan-STARRS 1	EUN	680 m	MPC · JPL
885520	2019 JX_{51}	—	May 2, 2019	Mount Lemmon	Mount Lemmon Survey	·	1.0 km	MPC · JPL
885521	2019 JJ_{52}	—	May 1, 2019	Haleakala	Pan-STARRS 1	·	870 m	MPC · JPL
885522	2019 JE_{53}	—	May 2, 2019	Haleakala	Pan-STARRS 1	·	1.2 km	MPC · JPL
885523	2019 JD_{55}	—	May 6, 2019	Haleakala	Pan-STARRS 1	H	320 m	MPC · JPL
885524	2019 JQ_{56}	—	May 8, 2019	Haleakala	Pan-STARRS 1	·	810 m	MPC · JPL
885525	2019 JR_{56}	—	April 6, 2019	Haleakala	Pan-STARRS 1	EUN	820 m	MPC · JPL
885526	2019 JP_{61}	—	May 15, 2015	Haleakala	Pan-STARRS 1	MAR	590 m	MPC · JPL
885527	2019 JO_{64}	—	May 2, 2019	Haleakala	Pan-STARRS 1	DOR	1.3 km	MPC · JPL
885528	2019 JT_{70}	—	May 8, 2019	Haleakala	Pan-STARRS 1	·	1.5 km	MPC · JPL
885529	2019 JK_{71}	—	May 8, 2019	Haleakala	Pan-STARRS 1	·	1.2 km	MPC · JPL
885530	2019 JP_{71}	—	May 8, 2019	Haleakala	Pan-STARRS 1	·	1.3 km	MPC · JPL
885531	2019 JK_{72}	—	May 1, 2019	Haleakala	Pan-STARRS 1	·	1.5 km	MPC · JPL
885532	2019 JZ_{72}	—	May 2, 2019	Haleakala	Pan-STARRS 1	·	1.3 km	MPC · JPL
885533	2019 JC_{73}	—	May 7, 2019	Haleakala	Pan-STARRS 1	·	910 m	MPC · JPL
885534	2019 JO_{73}	—	May 21, 2015	Haleakala	Pan-STARRS 1	·	1.3 km	MPC · JPL
885535	2019 JZ_{73}	—	May 8, 2019	Haleakala	Pan-STARRS 1	·	1.1 km	MPC · JPL
885536	2019 JF_{74}	—	May 1, 2019	Haleakala	Pan-STARRS 1	·	1.1 km	MPC · JPL
885537	2019 JU_{74}	—	May 9, 2019	Haleakala	Pan-STARRS 1	DOR	1.6 km	MPC · JPL
885538	2019 JJ_{80}	—	May 21, 2015	Haleakala	Pan-STARRS 1	·	1.1 km	MPC · JPL
885539	2019 JK_{80}	—	May 10, 2019	Haleakala	Pan-STARRS 1	·	1.7 km	MPC · JPL
885540	2019 JY_{84}	—	May 7, 2019	Haleakala	Pan-STARRS 1	·	810 m	MPC · JPL
885541	2019 JX_{86}	—	May 7, 2019	Haleakala	Pan-STARRS 1	·	1.1 km	MPC · JPL
885542	2019 JA_{89}	—	May 5, 2019	Cerro Tololo-DECam	DECam	(5)	750 m	MPC · JPL
885543	2019 JZ_{103}	—	May 5, 2019	Cerro Tololo-DECam	DECam	H	240 m	MPC · JPL
885544	2019 JQ_{108}	—	May 20, 2015	Cerro Tololo	DECam	(5)	640 m	MPC · JPL
885545	2019 JD_{112}	—	May 5, 2019	Cerro Tololo-DECam	DECam	·	1.1 km	MPC · JPL
885546	2019 JZ_{115}	—	May 1, 2019	Mount Lemmon	Mount Lemmon Survey	·	920 m	MPC · JPL
885547	2019 JV_{127}	—	May 8, 2019	Haleakala	Pan-STARRS 1	·	1.3 km	MPC · JPL
885548	2019 JU_{137}	—	May 2, 2019	Haleakala	Pan-STARRS 1	L5	5.9 km	MPC · JPL
885549	2019 KM_{1}	—	November 11, 2007	Mount Lemmon	Mount Lemmon Survey	H	420 m	MPC · JPL
885550	2019 KT_{1}	—	October 9, 2012	Mount Lemmon	Mount Lemmon Survey	H	290 m	MPC · JPL
885551	2019 KH_{2}	—	May 27, 2019	Haleakala	Pan-STARRS 2	AMO	190 m	MPC · JPL
885552	2019 KB_{4}	—	May 31, 2019	Mount Lemmon	Mount Lemmon Survey	AMO · PHA	370 m	MPC · JPL
885553	2019 KR_{4}	—	December 4, 2015	Haleakala	Pan-STARRS 1	L5	7.5 km	MPC · JPL
885554	2019 KU_{9}	—	May 30, 2019	Haleakala	Pan-STARRS 1	·	1.1 km	MPC · JPL
885555	2019 KD_{10}	—	May 29, 2019	Haleakala	Pan-STARRS 1	·	1.9 km	MPC · JPL
885556	2019 KR_{14}	—	May 27, 2019	Haleakala	Pan-STARRS 1	·	710 m	MPC · JPL
885557	2019 KV_{14}	—	May 29, 2019	Haleakala	Pan-STARRS 1	·	910 m	MPC · JPL
885558	2019 KH_{17}	—	July 23, 2015	Haleakala	Pan-STARRS 1	·	1.1 km	MPC · JPL
885559	2019 KR_{18}	—	October 19, 2006	Junk Bond	D. Healy	·	1.4 km	MPC · JPL
885560	2019 KS_{18}	—	May 30, 2019	Haleakala	Pan-STARRS 1	·	1.4 km	MPC · JPL
885561	2019 KE_{19}	—	May 29, 2019	Haleakala	Pan-STARRS 1	·	1.6 km	MPC · JPL
885562	2019 KP_{21}	—	May 18, 2014	Haleakala	Pan-STARRS 1	HOF	1.7 km	MPC · JPL
885563	2019 KL_{22}	—	May 26, 2019	Haleakala	Pan-STARRS 1	·	1.1 km	MPC · JPL
885564	2019 KZ_{23}	—	August 20, 2015	Kitt Peak	Spacewatch	·	1.2 km	MPC · JPL
885565	2019 KD_{25}	—	May 27, 2019	Haleakala	Pan-STARRS 1	·	1.2 km	MPC · JPL
885566	2019 KZ_{25}	—	May 30, 2019	Haleakala	Pan-STARRS 1	·	1.3 km	MPC · JPL
885567	2019 KV_{26}	—	October 21, 2011	Mount Lemmon	Mount Lemmon Survey	·	1.3 km	MPC · JPL
885568	2019 KO_{33}	—	May 30, 2019	Haleakala	Pan-STARRS 1	·	1.2 km	MPC · JPL
885569	2019 KN_{34}	—	May 27, 2019	Haleakala	Pan-STARRS 1	·	1.1 km	MPC · JPL
885570	2019 KD_{35}	—	May 31, 2019	Haleakala	Pan-STARRS 1	critical	1.2 km	MPC · JPL
885571	2019 KD_{36}	—	May 7, 2019	Haleakala	Pan-STARRS 1	H	410 m	MPC · JPL
885572	2019 KX_{37}	—	May 29, 2019	Haleakala	Pan-STARRS 1	·	940 m	MPC · JPL
885573	2019 KW_{47}	—	May 31, 2019	Haleakala	Pan-STARRS 1	H	340 m	MPC · JPL
885574	2019 KH_{51}	—	September 3, 2016	Mount Lemmon	Mount Lemmon Survey	HNS	800 m	MPC · JPL
885575	2019 KD_{73}	—	May 29, 2019	Haleakala	Pan-STARRS 1	·	1.1 km	MPC · JPL
885576	2019 LQ_{2}	—	March 3, 2016	Haleakala	Pan-STARRS 1	H	310 m	MPC · JPL
885577	2019 LN_{8}	—	August 3, 2002	Palomar	NEAT	(194)	970 m	MPC · JPL
885578	2019 LO_{8}	—	September 4, 2008	Kitt Peak	Spacewatch	·	1.6 km	MPC · JPL
885579	2019 LO_{10}	—	June 10, 2019	Haleakala	Pan-STARRS 1	·	1.5 km	MPC · JPL
885580	2019 LO_{13}	—	June 12, 2019	Haleakala	Pan-STARRS 1	·	1.5 km	MPC · JPL
885581	2019 LC_{16}	—	June 10, 2019	Haleakala	Pan-STARRS 1	EOS	1.2 km	MPC · JPL
885582	2019 LS_{16}	—	June 9, 2019	Haleakala	Pan-STARRS 1	THB	1.7 km	MPC · JPL
885583	2019 LA_{18}	—	June 1, 2019	Haleakala	Pan-STARRS 2	PAD	1.2 km	MPC · JPL
885584	2019 LN_{19}	—	June 9, 2019	Haleakala	Pan-STARRS 1	·	2.3 km	MPC · JPL
885585	2019 LO_{19}	—	June 2, 2019	Haleakala	Pan-STARRS 1	·	1.1 km	MPC · JPL
885586	2019 LS_{19}	—	December 5, 2016	Mount Lemmon	Mount Lemmon Survey	EUN	880 m	MPC · JPL
885587	2019 LJ_{20}	—	June 1, 2019	Mount Lemmon	Mount Lemmon Survey	·	2.4 km	MPC · JPL
885588	2019 LM_{21}	—	June 9, 2019	Haleakala	Pan-STARRS 1	·	1.6 km	MPC · JPL
885589	2019 LQ_{22}	—	June 3, 2019	Haleakala	Pan-STARRS 1	·	1.9 km	MPC · JPL
885590	2019 LO_{27}	—	June 1, 2019	Haleakala	Pan-STARRS 2	BAR	670 m	MPC · JPL
885591	2019 LR_{28}	—	April 28, 2014	Cerro Tololo	DECam	EUN	900 m	MPC · JPL
885592	2019 LV_{29}	—	June 1, 2019	Haleakala	Pan-STARRS 1	·	2.0 km	MPC · JPL
885593	2019 LH_{30}	—	June 4, 2019	Cerro Tololo-DECam	DECam	·	670 m	MPC · JPL
885594	2019 LP_{30}	—	June 12, 2019	Haleakala	Pan-STARRS 1	·	1.3 km	MPC · JPL
885595	2019 LD_{34}	—	June 8, 2019	Haleakala	Pan-STARRS 1	·	1.4 km	MPC · JPL
885596	2019 LK_{36}	—	October 12, 2007	Mount Lemmon	Mount Lemmon Survey	·	1.1 km	MPC · JPL
885597	2019 LZ_{41}	—	June 3, 2019	Mount Lemmon	Mount Lemmon Survey	·	1.3 km	MPC · JPL
885598	2019 LD_{44}	—	May 5, 2014	Cerro Tololo-DECam	DECam	·	1.4 km	MPC · JPL
885599	2019 MU_{1}	—	October 9, 2015	Haleakala	Pan-STARRS 1	·	830 m	MPC · JPL
885600	2019 MA_{3}	—	July 9, 2015	Haleakala	Pan-STARRS 1	·	870 m	MPC · JPL

== 885601–885700 ==
back to top

Designation			Discovery			Properties		Ref
Permanent	Provisional	Named after	Date	Site	Discoverer(s)	Category	Diam.	Ref
885601	2019 MU_{4}	—	June 28, 2019	Haleakala	Pan-STARRS 1	·	2.0 km	MPC · JPL
885602	2019 MJ_{5}	—	June 28, 2019	Haleakala	Pan-STARRS 1	·	1.5 km	MPC · JPL
885603	2019 ML_{8}	—	June 28, 2019	Mount Lemmon	Mount Lemmon Survey	·	2.4 km	MPC · JPL
885604	2019 MP_{8}	—	June 28, 2019	Haleakala	Pan-STARRS 1	·	1.5 km	MPC · JPL
885605	2019 MH_{9}	—	October 8, 2015	Haleakala	Pan-STARRS 1	·	1.3 km	MPC · JPL
885606	2019 MO_{13}	—	June 28, 2019	Haleakala	Pan-STARRS 1	·	1.6 km	MPC · JPL
885607	2019 MQ_{17}	—	June 28, 2019	Haleakala	Pan-STARRS 1	·	1.5 km	MPC · JPL
885608	2019 MP_{21}	—	June 29, 2019	Haleakala	Pan-STARRS 1	·	1.6 km	MPC · JPL
885609	2019 MC_{25}	—	June 29, 2019	Haleakala	Pan-STARRS 1	·	1.5 km	MPC · JPL
885610	2019 MS_{28}	—	June 30, 2019	Haleakala	Pan-STARRS 1	·	1.4 km	MPC · JPL
885611	2019 ML_{31}	—	June 28, 2019	Haleakala	Pan-STARRS 1	·	1.9 km	MPC · JPL
885612	2019 MB_{34}	—	June 28, 2019	Haleakala	Pan-STARRS 1	·	1.1 km	MPC · JPL
885613	2019 MC_{34}	—	June 28, 2019	Haleakala	Pan-STARRS 1	GEF	730 m	MPC · JPL
885614	2019 MK_{42}	—	June 30, 2019	Haleakala	Pan-STARRS 1	·	1.4 km	MPC · JPL
885615	2019 ML_{43}	—	June 28, 2019	Haleakala	Pan-STARRS 1	·	1.7 km	MPC · JPL
885616	2019 NR_{4}	—	July 3, 2019	Palomar Mountain	Zwicky Transient Facility	H	310 m	MPC · JPL
885617	2019 NJ_{7}	—	July 10, 2019	Palomar Mountain	Zwicky Transient Facility	APO	520 m	MPC · JPL
885618	2019 NE_{11}	—	July 10, 2019	Haleakala	Pan-STARRS 1	·	1.8 km	MPC · JPL
885619	2019 NJ_{11}	—	July 3, 2019	Palomar Mountain	Zwicky Transient Facility	·	1.9 km	MPC · JPL
885620	2019 ND_{12}	—	July 1, 2019	Haleakala	Pan-STARRS 1	THB	1.8 km	MPC · JPL
885621	2019 NU_{13}	—	July 6, 2019	Haleakala	Pan-STARRS 1	·	2.4 km	MPC · JPL
885622	2019 NB_{14}	—	July 8, 2019	Mount Lemmon	Mount Lemmon Survey	·	2.2 km	MPC · JPL
885623	2019 NP_{15}	—	July 7, 2019	Haleakala	Pan-STARRS 1	·	2.0 km	MPC · JPL
885624	2019 NA_{16}	—	July 1, 2019	Haleakala	Pan-STARRS 1	critical	1.7 km	MPC · JPL
885625	2019 NO_{16}	—	July 6, 2019	Haleakala	Pan-STARRS 1	·	1.5 km	MPC · JPL
885626	2019 NX_{16}	—	July 3, 2019	Haleakala	Pan-STARRS 2	·	1.8 km	MPC · JPL
885627	2019 NU_{17}	—	July 1, 2019	Haleakala	Pan-STARRS 1	PHO	630 m	MPC · JPL
885628	2019 NF_{20}	—	July 5, 2019	Mount Lemmon	Mount Lemmon Survey	·	2.9 km	MPC · JPL
885629	2019 NG_{21}	—	July 1, 2019	Haleakala	Pan-STARRS 1	·	370 m	MPC · JPL
885630	2019 NH_{21}	—	July 1, 2019	Haleakala	Pan-STARRS 1	·	1.3 km	MPC · JPL
885631	2019 NY_{21}	—	July 14, 2019	Haleakala	Pan-STARRS 1	T_{j} (2.98)	3.0 km	MPC · JPL
885632	2019 NQ_{22}	—	March 29, 2016	Cerro Tololo	DECam	THB	1.9 km	MPC · JPL
885633	2019 ND_{23}	—	August 10, 2007	Kitt Peak	Spacewatch	·	1.9 km	MPC · JPL
885634	2019 NE_{23}	—	July 10, 2019	Mount Lemmon	Mount Lemmon Survey	PHO	650 m	MPC · JPL
885635	2019 NF_{23}	—	July 2, 2019	Haleakala	Pan-STARRS 2	·	2.2 km	MPC · JPL
885636	2019 NR_{23}	—	June 6, 2019	Mount Lemmon	Mount Lemmon Survey	·	2.2 km	MPC · JPL
885637	2019 NS_{23}	—	July 2, 2019	Haleakala	Pan-STARRS 2	T_{j} (2.95)	2.1 km	MPC · JPL
885638	2019 NE_{24}	—	October 8, 2015	Haleakala	Pan-STARRS 1	·	1.6 km	MPC · JPL
885639	2019 NF_{24}	—	September 3, 2005	Palomar	NEAT	·	1.6 km	MPC · JPL
885640	2019 NM_{24}	—	November 27, 2017	Mount Lemmon	Mount Lemmon Survey	H	420 m	MPC · JPL
885641	2019 NR_{24}	—	October 28, 2014	Haleakala	Pan-STARRS 1	·	1.4 km	MPC · JPL
885642	2019 NE_{25}	—	July 3, 2019	Haleakala	Pan-STARRS 1	·	2.5 km	MPC · JPL
885643	2019 NG_{25}	—	July 3, 2019	Haleakala	Pan-STARRS 1	·	1.6 km	MPC · JPL
885644	2019 NB_{27}	—	October 2, 2008	Kitt Peak	Spacewatch	·	2.0 km	MPC · JPL
885645	2019 NM_{30}	—	July 3, 2019	Haleakala	Pan-STARRS 1	·	1.5 km	MPC · JPL
885646	2019 NW_{36}	—	July 1, 2019	Haleakala	Pan-STARRS 1	THM	1.4 km	MPC · JPL
885647	2019 NS_{40}	—	July 11, 2019	Haleakala	Pan-STARRS 1	·	2.6 km	MPC · JPL
885648	2019 NZ_{42}	—	July 6, 2019	Haleakala	Pan-STARRS 2	GAL	1.4 km	MPC · JPL
885649	2019 NA_{43}	—	July 10, 2019	Mount Lemmon	Mount Lemmon Survey	·	1.6 km	MPC · JPL
885650	2019 NS_{43}	—	July 4, 2019	Haleakala	Pan-STARRS 1	·	2.5 km	MPC · JPL
885651	2019 NR_{45}	—	July 3, 2019	Haleakala	Pan-STARRS 1	·	1.7 km	MPC · JPL
885652	2019 NS_{48}	—	July 2, 2019	Haleakala	Pan-STARRS 2	EUP	1.4 km	MPC · JPL
885653	2019 NV_{48}	—	July 4, 2019	Haleakala	Pan-STARRS 1	·	1.4 km	MPC · JPL
885654	2019 NE_{52}	—	July 9, 2019	Palomar Mountain	Zwicky Transient Facility	·	3.1 km	MPC · JPL
885655	2019 NC_{54}	—	July 6, 2019	Haleakala	Pan-STARRS 1	HNS	780 m	MPC · JPL
885656	2019 NF_{55}	—	July 1, 2019	Haleakala	Pan-STARRS 1	·	1.2 km	MPC · JPL
885657	2019 NU_{59}	—	July 1, 2019	Haleakala	Pan-STARRS 1	HOF	2.0 km	MPC · JPL
885658	2019 NU_{64}	—	July 4, 2019	Haleakala	Pan-STARRS 1	·	1.4 km	MPC · JPL
885659	2019 NU_{65}	—	July 6, 2019	Cerro Tololo-DECam	DECam	·	1.1 km	MPC · JPL
885660	2019 NZ_{71}	—	October 27, 2005	Mount Lemmon	Mount Lemmon Survey	KOR	690 m	MPC · JPL
885661	2019 NR_{78}	—	July 2, 2019	Haleakala	Pan-STARRS 2	H	320 m	MPC · JPL
885662	2019 ND_{80}	—	July 1, 2019	Haleakala	Pan-STARRS 1	MAR	730 m	MPC · JPL
885663	2019 NR_{81}	—	February 3, 2017	Mount Lemmon	Mount Lemmon Survey	·	1.2 km	MPC · JPL
885664	2019 NC_{82}	—	July 1, 2019	Haleakala	Pan-STARRS 1	GEF	920 m	MPC · JPL
885665	2019 NL_{82}	—	October 6, 2016	Haleakala	Pan-STARRS 1	·	500 m	MPC · JPL
885666	2019 NA_{83}	—	July 1, 2019	Haleakala	Pan-STARRS 1	AGN	770 m	MPC · JPL
885667	2019 NP_{84}	—	July 10, 2019	Haleakala	Pan-STARRS 1	·	1.5 km	MPC · JPL
885668	2019 NK_{85}	—	July 1, 2019	Haleakala	Pan-STARRS 1	KOR	940 m	MPC · JPL
885669	2019 NL_{85}	—	July 7, 2019	Haleakala	Pan-STARRS 1	·	1.2 km	MPC · JPL
885670	2019 NA_{91}	—	November 5, 2016	Kitt Peak	Spacewatch	·	660 m	MPC · JPL
885671	2019 NT_{109}	—	July 3, 2019	Cerro Tololo-DECam	DECam	KOR	840 m	MPC · JPL
885672	2019 NS_{110}	—	July 10, 2019	Haleakala	Pan-STARRS 1	·	1.2 km	MPC · JPL
885673	2019 NA_{111}	—	July 4, 2019	Haleakala	Pan-STARRS 1	·	1.9 km	MPC · JPL
885674	2019 NE_{112}	—	July 2, 2019	Haleakala	Pan-STARRS 1	·	1.4 km	MPC · JPL
885675	2019 NZ_{113}	—	July 4, 2019	Mount Lemmon	Mount Lemmon Survey	·	2.0 km	MPC · JPL
885676	2019 NM_{121}	—	July 5, 2019	Haleakala	Pan-STARRS 2	critical	2.3 km	MPC · JPL
885677	2019 OH_{1}	—	July 26, 2019	Haleakala	Pan-STARRS 1	ATE	110 m	MPC · JPL
885678	2019 OU_{5}	—	July 30, 2019	Haleakala	Pan-STARRS 1	THM · critical	1.3 km	MPC · JPL
885679	2019 OB_{6}	—	July 30, 2019	Haleakala	Pan-STARRS 1	VER	1.6 km	MPC · JPL
885680	2019 ON_{6}	—	July 30, 2019	Haleakala	Pan-STARRS 1	EOS	1.1 km	MPC · JPL
885681	2019 OR_{6}	—	July 30, 2019	Haleakala	Pan-STARRS 1	critical	1.9 km	MPC · JPL
885682	2019 OX_{6}	—	August 27, 2014	Haleakala	Pan-STARRS 1	EOS	1.0 km	MPC · JPL
885683	2019 OY_{6}	—	July 30, 2019	Haleakala	Pan-STARRS 1	·	1.2 km	MPC · JPL
885684	2019 OS_{8}	—	September 17, 2009	Kitt Peak	Spacewatch	·	1.2 km	MPC · JPL
885685	2019 OQ_{9}	—	September 6, 2008	Mount Lemmon	Mount Lemmon Survey	·	1.9 km	MPC · JPL
885686	2019 OJ_{11}	—	July 28, 2019	Haleakala	Pan-STARRS 2	THB	1.8 km	MPC · JPL
885687	2019 ON_{11}	—	October 1, 2014	Haleakala	Pan-STARRS 1	·	2.0 km	MPC · JPL
885688	2019 ON_{12}	—	September 19, 2014	Haleakala	Pan-STARRS 1	·	1.5 km	MPC · JPL
885689	2019 OR_{13}	—	July 24, 2019	Haleakala	Pan-STARRS 1	·	1.5 km	MPC · JPL
885690	2019 OB_{15}	—	January 14, 2016	Haleakala	Pan-STARRS 1	·	2.5 km	MPC · JPL
885691	2019 OE_{15}	—	January 12, 2016	Haleakala	Pan-STARRS 1	·	3.0 km	MPC · JPL
885692	2019 OT_{15}	—	October 6, 2008	Catalina	CSS	·	2.1 km	MPC · JPL
885693	2019 OF_{16}	—	September 3, 2002	Palomar	NEAT	·	2.8 km	MPC · JPL
885694	2019 OU_{16}	—	September 19, 2014	Haleakala	Pan-STARRS 1	·	2.0 km	MPC · JPL
885695	2019 OR_{17}	—	July 28, 2003	Palomar	NEAT	·	1.8 km	MPC · JPL
885696	2019 OS_{17}	—	January 15, 2015	Haleakala	Pan-STARRS 1	THB	1.8 km	MPC · JPL
885697	2019 OU_{18}	—	June 30, 2019	Haleakala	Pan-STARRS 1	·	930 m	MPC · JPL
885698	2019 OX_{19}	—	July 25, 2019	Haleakala	Pan-STARRS 1	EOS	1.3 km	MPC · JPL
885699	2019 OH_{22}	—	October 3, 2014	Mount Lemmon	Mount Lemmon Survey	·	1.8 km	MPC · JPL
885700	2019 OJ_{23}	—	July 28, 2019	Haleakala	Pan-STARRS 2	·	1.5 km	MPC · JPL

== 885701–885800 ==
back to top

Designation			Discovery			Properties		Ref
Permanent	Provisional	Named after	Date	Site	Discoverer(s)	Category	Diam.	Ref
885701	2019 OV_{23}	—	July 30, 2019	Haleakala	Pan-STARRS 1	·	2.1 km	MPC · JPL
885702	2019 OE_{24}	—	July 30, 2019	Haleakala	Pan-STARRS 2	·	1.9 km	MPC · JPL
885703	2019 OU_{24}	—	July 28, 2019	Haleakala	Pan-STARRS 2	·	2.0 km	MPC · JPL
885704	2019 OH_{25}	—	July 24, 2019	Haleakala	Pan-STARRS 1	·	2.7 km	MPC · JPL
885705	2019 OC_{26}	—	September 21, 2000	Kitt Peak	Deep Ecliptic Survey	·	1.3 km	MPC · JPL
885706	2019 OE_{28}	—	July 24, 2019	Palomar Mountain	Zwicky Transient Facility	·	1.8 km	MPC · JPL
885707	2019 OC_{29}	—	July 28, 2019	Haleakala	Pan-STARRS 1	·	2.2 km	MPC · JPL
885708	2019 OS_{29}	—	July 26, 2019	Haleakala	Pan-STARRS 1	T_{j} (2.99)	2.5 km	MPC · JPL
885709	2019 OQ_{37}	—	July 25, 2019	Haleakala	Pan-STARRS 2	·	1.6 km	MPC · JPL
885710	2019 OQ_{45}	—	July 29, 2019	Haleakala	Pan-STARRS 1	HOF	1.5 km	MPC · JPL
885711	2019 ON_{54}	—	July 25, 2019	Haleakala	Pan-STARRS 1	VER	1.4 km	MPC · JPL
885712	2019 OK_{61}	—	July 26, 2019	Haleakala	Pan-STARRS 1	critical	1.7 km	MPC · JPL
885713	2019 PO_{3}	—	August 11, 2019	Haleakala	Pan-STARRS 1	·	1.1 km	MPC · JPL
885714	2019 PV_{3}	—	September 19, 2014	Haleakala	Pan-STARRS 1	·	1.4 km	MPC · JPL
885715	2019 PD_{4}	—	August 8, 2019	Haleakala	Pan-STARRS 2	critical	1.5 km	MPC · JPL
885716	2019 PO_{4}	—	September 20, 2014	Haleakala	Pan-STARRS 1	·	1.6 km	MPC · JPL
885717	2019 PP_{4}	—	August 8, 2019	Haleakala	Pan-STARRS 2	·	1.8 km	MPC · JPL
885718	2019 PM_{5}	—	September 26, 2003	Sacramento Peak	SDSS	·	1.3 km	MPC · JPL
885719	2019 PX_{5}	—	February 15, 2012	Haleakala	Pan-STARRS 1	·	1.3 km	MPC · JPL
885720	2019 PY_{5}	—	October 4, 2014	Kitt Peak	Spacewatch	THM	1.5 km	MPC · JPL
885721	2019 PF_{6}	—	August 27, 2014	Haleakala	Pan-STARRS 1	·	960 m	MPC · JPL
885722	2019 PP_{6}	—	August 8, 2019	Haleakala	Pan-STARRS 2	AGN	690 m	MPC · JPL
885723	2019 PJ_{8}	—	August 8, 2019	Haleakala	Pan-STARRS 2	·	1.5 km	MPC · JPL
885724	2019 PL_{8}	—	August 22, 2014	Haleakala	Pan-STARRS 1	EOS	980 m	MPC · JPL
885725	2019 PS_{8}	—	August 8, 2019	Haleakala	Pan-STARRS 2	KOR	910 m	MPC · JPL
885726	2019 PF_{9}	—	October 19, 2003	Sacramento Peak	SDSS	·	1.7 km	MPC · JPL
885727	2019 PF_{10}	—	August 9, 2019	Haleakala	Pan-STARRS 2	·	1.7 km	MPC · JPL
885728	2019 PL_{10}	—	October 1, 2014	Haleakala	Pan-STARRS 1	·	1.5 km	MPC · JPL
885729	2019 PN_{12}	—	August 4, 2019	Haleakala	Pan-STARRS 1	·	1.7 km	MPC · JPL
885730	2019 PC_{13}	—	October 15, 2014	Catalina	CSS	·	1.4 km	MPC · JPL
885731	2019 PN_{13}	—	August 8, 2019	Haleakala	Pan-STARRS 2	critical	1.4 km	MPC · JPL
885732	2019 PO_{13}	—	August 8, 2019	Haleakala	Pan-STARRS 2	·	1.2 km	MPC · JPL
885733	2019 PA_{14}	—	September 23, 2015	Haleakala	Pan-STARRS 1	(194)	1.3 km	MPC · JPL
885734	2019 PN_{15}	—	August 11, 2019	Haleakala	Pan-STARRS 1	URS	2.2 km	MPC · JPL
885735	2019 PP_{15}	—	October 26, 2008	Kitt Peak	Spacewatch	LIX	2.1 km	MPC · JPL
885736	2019 PW_{16}	—	November 16, 2014	Kitt Peak	Spacewatch	·	1.2 km	MPC · JPL
885737	2019 PY_{18}	—	June 3, 2019	Mount Lemmon	Mount Lemmon Survey	·	920 m	MPC · JPL
885738	2019 PT_{21}	—	August 8, 2019	Haleakala	Pan-STARRS 1	·	1.7 km	MPC · JPL
885739	2019 PE_{22}	—	August 31, 2014	Haleakala	Pan-STARRS 1	·	1.6 km	MPC · JPL
885740	2019 PV_{23}	—	October 2, 2014	Haleakala	Pan-STARRS 1	·	1.8 km	MPC · JPL
885741	2019 PR_{24}	—	August 12, 2019	Haleakala	Pan-STARRS 1	·	2.2 km	MPC · JPL
885742	2019 PC_{27}	—	September 26, 2008	Kitt Peak	Spacewatch	·	2.0 km	MPC · JPL
885743	2019 PR_{30}	—	September 16, 2003	Palomar	NEAT	·	1.9 km	MPC · JPL
885744	2019 PZ_{33}	—	August 4, 2019	Haleakala	Pan-STARRS 1	·	1.4 km	MPC · JPL
885745	2019 PT_{34}	—	August 4, 2019	Haleakala	Pan-STARRS 1	·	1.1 km	MPC · JPL
885746	2019 PL_{35}	—	August 4, 2019	Haleakala	Pan-STARRS 1	·	1.9 km	MPC · JPL
885747	2019 PS_{37}	—	August 4, 2019	Haleakala	Pan-STARRS 1	THM	1.1 km	MPC · JPL
885748	2019 PG_{45}	—	August 8, 2019	Haleakala	Pan-STARRS 1	HOF	1.9 km	MPC · JPL
885749	2019 PE_{52}	—	August 7, 2019	Haleakala	Pan-STARRS 2	·	1.8 km	MPC · JPL
885750	2019 PK_{52}	—	August 4, 2019	Haleakala	Pan-STARRS 1	·	1.5 km	MPC · JPL
885751	2019 PJ_{53}	—	August 8, 2019	Haleakala	Pan-STARRS 1	MAR	680 m	MPC · JPL
885752	2019 PM_{53}	—	August 8, 2019	Haleakala	Pan-STARRS 1	·	1.7 km	MPC · JPL
885753	2019 PX_{64}	—	August 8, 2019	Haleakala	Pan-STARRS 2	·	1.2 km	MPC · JPL
885754	2019 PV_{91}	—	August 8, 2019	Haleakala	Pan-STARRS 1	·	1.4 km	MPC · JPL
885755	2019 QM_{10}	—	July 1, 2019	Haleakala	Pan-STARRS 1	·	1.7 km	MPC · JPL
885756	2019 QN_{11}	—	September 26, 2008	Kitt Peak	Spacewatch	·	860 m	MPC · JPL
885757	2019 QZ_{11}	—	September 19, 2014	Haleakala	Pan-STARRS 1	·	740 m	MPC · JPL
885758	2019 QV_{12}	—	August 31, 2019	Haleakala	Pan-STARRS 1	·	1.5 km	MPC · JPL
885759	2019 QX_{13}	—	August 15, 2013	Haleakala	Pan-STARRS 1	·	1.8 km	MPC · JPL
885760	2019 QZ_{13}	—	August 23, 2019	Haleakala	Pan-STARRS 1	·	2.6 km	MPC · JPL
885761	2019 QJ_{15}	—	August 27, 2019	Mount Lemmon	Mount Lemmon Survey	·	1.1 km	MPC · JPL
885762	2019 QH_{16}	—	August 27, 2019	Mount Lemmon	Mount Lemmon Survey	·	1.5 km	MPC · JPL
885763	2019 QJ_{16}	—	August 27, 2019	Mount Lemmon	Mount Lemmon Survey	·	2.2 km	MPC · JPL
885764	2019 QY_{16}	—	May 18, 2007	Kitt Peak	Spacewatch	·	2.1 km	MPC · JPL
885765	2019 QC_{17}	—	October 1, 2014	Haleakala	Pan-STARRS 1	·	950 m	MPC · JPL
885766	2019 QY_{17}	—	August 26, 2013	Haleakala	Pan-STARRS 1	TIR	1.6 km	MPC · JPL
885767	2019 QC_{18}	—	February 21, 2012	Kitt Peak	Spacewatch	·	2.1 km	MPC · JPL
885768	2019 QS_{20}	—	August 31, 2019	Haleakala	Pan-STARRS 1	·	750 m	MPC · JPL
885769	2019 QB_{22}	—	August 23, 2019	Haleakala	Pan-STARRS 1	H	420 m	MPC · JPL
885770	2019 QF_{22}	—	August 27, 2019	Haleakala	Pan-STARRS 2	·	2.3 km	MPC · JPL
885771	2019 QQ_{22}	—	September 7, 2000	Kitt Peak	Spacewatch	·	820 m	MPC · JPL
885772	2019 QG_{23}	—	September 9, 2007	Kitt Peak	Spacewatch	·	2.2 km	MPC · JPL
885773	2019 QJ_{23}	—	June 20, 2013	Haleakala	Pan-STARRS 1	·	2.0 km	MPC · JPL
885774	2019 QY_{25}	—	November 18, 2008	Kitt Peak	Spacewatch	·	1.8 km	MPC · JPL
885775	2019 QC_{26}	—	August 28, 2019	Cerro Tololo-DECam	DECam	THM	1.4 km	MPC · JPL
885776	2019 QC_{27}	—	December 28, 2014	Mount Lemmon	Mount Lemmon Survey	·	2.2 km	MPC · JPL
885777	2019 QS_{28}	—	August 27, 2019	ESA OGS	ESA OGS	·	2.7 km	MPC · JPL
885778	2019 QF_{30}	—	August 26, 2019	Haleakala	Pan-STARRS 2	T_{j} (2.99)	2.6 km	MPC · JPL
885779	2019 QX_{30}	—	August 24, 2019	Haleakala	Pan-STARRS 1	EOS	1.2 km	MPC · JPL
885780	2019 QQ_{31}	—	August 28, 2019	Cerro Tololo-DECam	DECam	·	1.7 km	MPC · JPL
885781	2019 QS_{32}	—	August 31, 2019	Haleakala	Pan-STARRS 1	·	2.0 km	MPC · JPL
885782	2019 QB_{33}	—	August 27, 2019	Mount Lemmon	Mount Lemmon Survey	·	2.1 km	MPC · JPL
885783	2019 QF_{33}	—	August 22, 2019	Haleakala	Pan-STARRS 1	·	1.6 km	MPC · JPL
885784	2019 QH_{33}	—	August 31, 2019	Haleakala	Pan-STARRS 1	EOS	1.2 km	MPC · JPL
885785	2019 QQ_{33}	—	March 5, 2010	WISE	WISE	·	2.3 km	MPC · JPL
885786	2019 QW_{35}	—	August 27, 2019	Mount Lemmon	Mount Lemmon Survey	·	2.4 km	MPC · JPL
885787	2019 QC_{36}	—	August 22, 2019	Haleakala	Pan-STARRS 1	·	2.4 km	MPC · JPL
885788	2019 QJ_{36}	—	August 22, 2019	Cerro Paranal	Gaia Ground Based Optical Tracking	·	1.0 km	MPC · JPL
885789	2019 QN_{37}	—	August 29, 2019	Haleakala	Pan-STARRS 1	HYG	1.8 km	MPC · JPL
885790	2019 QP_{39}	—	February 25, 2017	Haleakala	Pan-STARRS 1	EOS	1.3 km	MPC · JPL
885791	2019 QF_{41}	—	February 3, 2016	Haleakala	Pan-STARRS 1	·	1.9 km	MPC · JPL
885792	2019 QC_{44}	—	August 29, 2019	Haleakala	Pan-STARRS 1	critical	1.3 km	MPC · JPL
885793	2019 QC_{45}	—	August 29, 2019	Haleakala	Pan-STARRS 1	·	1.6 km	MPC · JPL
885794	2019 QB_{46}	—	October 16, 2012	Mount Lemmon	Mount Lemmon Survey	CLA	1.0 km	MPC · JPL
885795	2019 QC_{46}	—	September 2, 2014	Haleakala	Pan-STARRS 1	·	1.4 km	MPC · JPL
885796	2019 QM_{46}	—	August 28, 2019	Haleakala	Pan-STARRS 1	·	1.1 km	MPC · JPL
885797	2019 QL_{47}	—	August 29, 2019	Haleakala	Pan-STARRS 1	·	1.4 km	MPC · JPL
885798	2019 QR_{47}	—	August 31, 2005	Kitt Peak	Spacewatch	·	550 m	MPC · JPL
885799	2019 QT_{47}	—	February 5, 2016	Haleakala	Pan-STARRS 1	·	1.3 km	MPC · JPL
885800	2019 QC_{48}	—	August 20, 2014	Haleakala	Pan-STARRS 1	·	1.2 km	MPC · JPL

== 885801–885900 ==
back to top

Designation			Discovery			Properties		Ref
Permanent	Provisional	Named after	Date	Site	Discoverer(s)	Category	Diam.	Ref
885801	2019 QP_{50}	—	August 27, 2019	Mount Lemmon	Mount Lemmon Survey	·	1.9 km	MPC · JPL
885802	2019 QM_{53}	—	August 29, 2019	Haleakala	Pan-STARRS 1	·	1.1 km	MPC · JPL
885803	2019 QL_{54}	—	August 31, 2019	Haleakala	Pan-STARRS 1	·	2.8 km	MPC · JPL
885804	2019 QT_{55}	—	August 28, 2019	Cerro Tololo-DECam	DECam	critical	1.3 km	MPC · JPL
885805	2019 QW_{57}	—	August 24, 2019	Cerro Paranal	Gaia Ground Based Optical Tracking	·	1.1 km	MPC · JPL
885806	2019 QH_{58}	—	January 28, 2011	Mount Lemmon	Mount Lemmon Survey	EOS	970 m	MPC · JPL
885807	2019 QR_{58}	—	February 4, 2017	Haleakala	Pan-STARRS 1	·	1.5 km	MPC · JPL
885808	2019 QC_{60}	—	August 28, 2019	Haleakala	Pan-STARRS 1	·	800 m	MPC · JPL
885809	2019 QG_{60}	—	August 28, 2019	Haleakala	Pan-STARRS 1	·	1.6 km	MPC · JPL
885810	2019 QS_{64}	—	December 13, 2015	Haleakala	Pan-STARRS 1	·	1.1 km	MPC · JPL
885811	2019 QH_{66}	—	August 28, 2019	Haleakala	Pan-STARRS 1	·	1.4 km	MPC · JPL
885812	2019 QL_{71}	—	August 28, 2019	Haleakala	Pan-STARRS 1	·	1.1 km	MPC · JPL
885813	2019 QH_{74}	—	August 27, 2019	Mount Lemmon	Mount Lemmon Survey	·	2.1 km	MPC · JPL
885814	2019 QA_{76}	—	January 2, 2016	Mount Lemmon	Mount Lemmon Survey	·	1.5 km	MPC · JPL
885815	2019 QU_{81}	—	August 28, 2019	Cerro Tololo-DECam	DECam	EOS	1.0 km	MPC · JPL
885816	2019 QE_{83}	—	August 29, 2019	Haleakala	Pan-STARRS 1	·	1.4 km	MPC · JPL
885817	2019 QW_{91}	—	August 29, 2019	Haleakala	Pan-STARRS 1	·	1.1 km	MPC · JPL
885818	2019 QB_{95}	—	August 29, 2019	Haleakala	Pan-STARRS 1	·	1.2 km	MPC · JPL
885819	2019 QK_{105}	—	August 28, 2019	Cerro Tololo-DECam	DECam	·	940 m	MPC · JPL
885820	2019 QJ_{107}	—	August 27, 2019	Mount Lemmon	Mount Lemmon Survey	EUN	590 m	MPC · JPL
885821	2019 QD_{116}	—	August 21, 2019	Mount Lemmon	Mount Lemmon Survey	·	1.5 km	MPC · JPL
885822	2019 QM_{116}	—	August 26, 2019	Haleakala	Pan-STARRS 2	·	2.2 km	MPC · JPL
885823	2019 QO_{126}	—	August 28, 2019	Haleakala	Pan-STARRS 1	·	930 m	MPC · JPL
885824	2019 QM_{128}	—	August 25, 2019	Palomar Mountain	Zwicky Transient Facility	·	2.4 km	MPC · JPL
885825	2019 RX_{4}	—	September 4, 2019	Mount Lemmon	Mount Lemmon Survey	·	2.0 km	MPC · JPL
885826	2019 RY_{4}	—	August 31, 2019	Palomar Mountain	Zwicky Transient Facility	PHO	540 m	MPC · JPL
885827	2019 RD_{5}	—	July 9, 2019	Mount Lemmon	Mount Lemmon Survey	·	2.0 km	MPC · JPL
885828	2019 RF_{5}	—	November 18, 2014	Haleakala	Pan-STARRS 1	·	2.2 km	MPC · JPL
885829	2019 RP_{5}	—	September 4, 2019	Mount Lemmon	Mount Lemmon Survey	T_{j} (2.97)	1.9 km	MPC · JPL
885830	2019 RZ_{5}	—	September 4, 2019	Mount Lemmon	Mount Lemmon Survey	·	1.6 km	MPC · JPL
885831	2019 RA_{6}	—	September 27, 2003	Kitt Peak	Spacewatch	·	1.9 km	MPC · JPL
885832	2019 RF_{6}	—	September 5, 2019	Mount Lemmon	Mount Lemmon Survey	·	1.8 km	MPC · JPL
885833	2019 RS_{6}	—	January 14, 2015	Haleakala	Pan-STARRS 1	·	1.9 km	MPC · JPL
885834	2019 RN_{7}	—	October 4, 2002	Socorro	LINEAR	·	2.2 km	MPC · JPL
885835	2019 RY_{7}	—	November 19, 2014	Haleakala	Pan-STARRS 1	·	1.7 km	MPC · JPL
885836	2019 RQ_{8}	—	September 20, 2003	·	LONEOS	·	1.4 km	MPC · JPL
885837	2019 RV_{8}	—	December 31, 2008	Mount Lemmon	Mount Lemmon Survey	·	2.0 km	MPC · JPL
885838	2019 RJ_{9}	—	September 26, 2002	Palomar	NEAT	critical	2.0 km	MPC · JPL
885839	2019 RL_{9}	—	September 14, 2013	Haleakala	Pan-STARRS 1	·	2.3 km	MPC · JPL
885840	2019 RO_{9}	—	September 3, 2019	Mount Lemmon	Mount Lemmon Survey	·	1.7 km	MPC · JPL
885841	2019 RQ_{9}	—	March 7, 2010	WISE	WISE	·	2.0 km	MPC · JPL
885842	2019 RD_{12}	—	September 10, 2013	Haleakala	Pan-STARRS 1	·	1.7 km	MPC · JPL
885843	2019 RK_{12}	—	September 4, 2019	Mount Lemmon	Mount Lemmon Survey	·	2.1 km	MPC · JPL
885844	2019 RU_{12}	—	October 30, 2014	Mount Lemmon	Mount Lemmon Survey	TIR	2.0 km	MPC · JPL
885845	2019 RP_{13}	—	November 13, 1996	Kitt Peak	Spacewatch	·	2.0 km	MPC · JPL
885846	2019 RU_{13}	—	August 10, 2007	Kitt Peak	Spacewatch	·	2.0 km	MPC · JPL
885847	2019 RM_{14}	—	August 12, 2013	Haleakala	Pan-STARRS 1	·	2.1 km	MPC · JPL
885848	2019 RP_{14}	—	March 29, 2016	Cerro Tololo	DECam	T_{j} (2.97)	2.1 km	MPC · JPL
885849	2019 RN_{16}	—	September 5, 2019	Mount Lemmon	Mount Lemmon Survey	·	1.3 km	MPC · JPL
885850	2019 RP_{16}	—	September 4, 2019	Mount Lemmon	Mount Lemmon Survey	·	2.0 km	MPC · JPL
885851	2019 RS_{17}	—	September 5, 2019	Mount Lemmon	Mount Lemmon Survey	T_{j} (2.99) · EUP	1.9 km	MPC · JPL
885852	2019 RP_{20}	—	July 13, 2013	Haleakala	Pan-STARRS 1	·	1.8 km	MPC · JPL
885853	2019 RQ_{20}	—	September 4, 2019	Mount Lemmon	Mount Lemmon Survey	·	1.5 km	MPC · JPL
885854	2019 RC_{21}	—	March 28, 2016	Cerro Tololo	DECam	·	2.2 km	MPC · JPL
885855	2019 RR_{22}	—	September 5, 2019	Mount Lemmon	Mount Lemmon Survey	LIX · critical	1.9 km	MPC · JPL
885856	2019 RZ_{22}	—	January 18, 2016	Haleakala	Pan-STARRS 1	·	2.2 km	MPC · JPL
885857	2019 RB_{23}	—	October 28, 2014	Haleakala	Pan-STARRS 1	·	1.2 km	MPC · JPL
885858	2019 RN_{24}	—	September 5, 2019	Mount Lemmon	Mount Lemmon Survey	·	960 m	MPC · JPL
885859	2019 RK_{25}	—	March 29, 2016	Cerro Tololo	DECam	EUP	1.6 km	MPC · JPL
885860	2019 RJ_{27}	—	September 5, 2019	Mount Lemmon	Mount Lemmon Survey	·	1.6 km	MPC · JPL
885861	2019 RJ_{29}	—	September 3, 2019	Mount Lemmon	Mount Lemmon Survey	·	1.3 km	MPC · JPL
885862	2019 RW_{29}	—	September 5, 2019	Mount Lemmon	Mount Lemmon Survey	·	2.1 km	MPC · JPL
885863	2019 RB_{30}	—	September 6, 2019	Haleakala	Pan-STARRS 1	·	1.5 km	MPC · JPL
885864	2019 RF_{32}	—	September 4, 2019	Haleakala	Pan-STARRS 1	·	2.2 km	MPC · JPL
885865	2019 RY_{35}	—	October 18, 2009	Mount Lemmon	Mount Lemmon Survey	·	1.1 km	MPC · JPL
885866	2019 RM_{38}	—	September 5, 2019	Mount Lemmon	Mount Lemmon Survey	·	1.6 km	MPC · JPL
885867	2019 RY_{38}	—	September 6, 2019	Haleakala	Pan-STARRS 1	·	880 m	MPC · JPL
885868	2019 RJ_{41}	—	May 23, 2018	Haleakala	Pan-STARRS 1	(895)	2.2 km	MPC · JPL
885869	2019 RO_{41}	—	January 7, 2010	Mount Lemmon	Mount Lemmon Survey	EOS	1.2 km	MPC · JPL
885870	2019 RW_{42}	—	September 20, 2014	Haleakala	Pan-STARRS 1	·	1.5 km	MPC · JPL
885871	2019 RR_{48}	—	March 28, 2016	Cerro Tololo	DECam	·	1.9 km	MPC · JPL
885872	2019 RV_{48}	—	September 3, 2019	Mount Lemmon	Mount Lemmon Survey	·	1.5 km	MPC · JPL
885873	2019 RS_{49}	—	September 4, 2019	Mount Lemmon	Mount Lemmon Survey	·	1.3 km	MPC · JPL
885874	2019 RU_{50}	—	September 4, 2019	Haleakala	Pan-STARRS 1	·	1.6 km	MPC · JPL
885875	2019 RX_{55}	—	January 30, 2014	Kitt Peak	Spacewatch	·	590 m	MPC · JPL
885876	2019 RJ_{59}	—	September 6, 2019	Haleakala	Pan-STARRS 1	THM	1.3 km	MPC · JPL
885877	2019 RE_{62}	—	March 17, 2012	Mount Lemmon	Mount Lemmon Survey	EOS	1.1 km	MPC · JPL
885878	2019 RM_{70}	—	September 5, 2019	Mount Lemmon	Mount Lemmon Survey	·	880 m	MPC · JPL
885879	2019 RV_{70}	—	July 14, 2013	Haleakala	Pan-STARRS 1	·	2.0 km	MPC · JPL
885880	2019 RW_{72}	—	September 6, 2019	Haleakala	Pan-STARRS 1	·	1.5 km	MPC · JPL
885881	2019 RB_{73}	—	September 10, 2019	Haleakala	Pan-STARRS 1	LUT	3.0 km	MPC · JPL
885882	2019 RJ_{73}	—	September 6, 2019	Haleakala	Pan-STARRS 1	VER	1.5 km	MPC · JPL
885883	2019 RV_{77}	—	September 7, 2019	Mount Lemmon	Mount Lemmon Survey	·	2.0 km	MPC · JPL
885884	2019 RD_{78}	—	April 23, 2014	Cerro Tololo	DECam	(6769)	620 m	MPC · JPL
885885	2019 RO_{79}	—	September 6, 2019	Haleakala	Pan-STARRS 1	·	1.3 km	MPC · JPL
885886	2019 RZ_{79}	—	September 2, 2019	Cerro Tololo-DECam	DECam	·	520 m	MPC · JPL
885887	2019 RU_{86}	—	September 6, 2019	Haleakala	Pan-STARRS 1	·	1.1 km	MPC · JPL
885888	2019 RQ_{93}	—	September 3, 2019	Mount Lemmon	Mount Lemmon Survey	·	1.4 km	MPC · JPL
885889	2019 SP_{11}	—	September 7, 2008	Mount Lemmon	Mount Lemmon Survey	T_{j} (2.93)	2.3 km	MPC · JPL
885890	2019 ST_{11}	—	September 22, 2019	Mount Lemmon	Mount Lemmon Survey	·	2.0 km	MPC · JPL
885891	2019 SG_{12}	—	April 1, 2016	Haleakala	Pan-STARRS 1	·	1.9 km	MPC · JPL
885892	2019 SQ_{12}	—	September 27, 2013	Haleakala	Pan-STARRS 1	·	2.1 km	MPC · JPL
885893	2019 ST_{12}	—	March 21, 2015	Haleakala	Pan-STARRS 1	·	660 m	MPC · JPL
885894	2019 SZ_{13}	—	December 12, 2015	Haleakala	Pan-STARRS 1	·	880 m	MPC · JPL
885895	2019 SF_{15}	—	September 24, 2019	Haleakala	Pan-STARRS 1	·	1.5 km	MPC · JPL
885896	2019 SN_{15}	—	September 25, 2019	Haleakala	Pan-STARRS 1	·	1.7 km	MPC · JPL
885897	2019 SO_{15}	—	September 26, 2019	Haleakala	Pan-STARRS 1	·	2.2 km	MPC · JPL
885898	2019 SL_{16}	—	October 8, 2008	Kitt Peak	Spacewatch	·	2.0 km	MPC · JPL
885899	2019 SR_{16}	—	October 24, 2014	Mount Lemmon	Mount Lemmon Survey	·	1.9 km	MPC · JPL
885900	2019 SM_{17}	—	April 12, 2010	WISE	WISE	·	2.3 km	MPC · JPL

== 885901–886000 ==
back to top

Designation			Discovery			Properties		Ref
Permanent	Provisional	Named after	Date	Site	Discoverer(s)	Category	Diam.	Ref
885901	2019 SQ_{17}	—	September 6, 2013	Kitt Peak	Spacewatch	·	2.1 km	MPC · JPL
885902	2019 SX_{17}	—	March 28, 2016	Cerro Tololo	DECam	·	2.2 km	MPC · JPL
885903	2019 SH_{18}	—	March 29, 2016	Cerro Tololo	DECam	·	1.6 km	MPC · JPL
885904	2019 SQ_{19}	—	September 22, 2019	Mount Lemmon	Mount Lemmon Survey	EUP	2.5 km	MPC · JPL
885905	2019 SY_{21}	—	August 29, 2008	La Sagra	OAM	·	1.5 km	MPC · JPL
885906	2019 SO_{22}	—	September 25, 2019	Haleakala	Pan-STARRS 1	·	770 m	MPC · JPL
885907	2019 SS_{23}	—	September 22, 2008	Catalina	CSS	·	1.7 km	MPC · JPL
885908	2019 SU_{23}	—	September 22, 2019	Mount Lemmon	Mount Lemmon Survey	·	2.4 km	MPC · JPL
885909	2019 SW_{23}	—	September 6, 2008	Mount Lemmon	Mount Lemmon Survey	critical	2.1 km	MPC · JPL
885910	2019 SE_{24}	—	September 12, 2013	Mount Lemmon	Mount Lemmon Survey	THM	1.6 km	MPC · JPL
885911	2019 SO_{24}	—	January 13, 2016	Haleakala	Pan-STARRS 1	·	830 m	MPC · JPL
885912	2019 SF_{25}	—	October 8, 2008	Kitt Peak	Spacewatch	·	1.6 km	MPC · JPL
885913	2019 SZ_{25}	—	May 1, 2016	Cerro Tololo	DECam	·	1.5 km	MPC · JPL
885914	2019 SU_{26}	—	November 4, 2002	Palomar	NEAT	·	820 m	MPC · JPL
885915	2019 SF_{28}	—	September 26, 2019	Haleakala	Pan-STARRS 1	·	2.3 km	MPC · JPL
885916	2019 SR_{28}	—	October 5, 2013	Haleakala	Pan-STARRS 1	·	1.7 km	MPC · JPL
885917	2019 SW_{28}	—	July 27, 2019	Haleakala	Pan-STARRS 1	·	2.6 km	MPC · JPL
885918	2019 SQ_{29}	—	August 31, 2019	Palomar Mountain	Zwicky Transient Facility	·	2.3 km	MPC · JPL
885919	2019 SR_{29}	—	December 1, 2008	Kitt Peak	Spacewatch	TIR	1.8 km	MPC · JPL
885920	2019 SR_{30}	—	September 30, 2019	Mount Lemmon	Mount Lemmon Survey	·	2.4 km	MPC · JPL
885921	2019 SK_{31}	—	September 26, 2019	Haleakala	Pan-STARRS 1	H	400 m	MPC · JPL
885922	2019 SM_{32}	—	September 2, 2013	Mount Lemmon	Mount Lemmon Survey	THM	1.7 km	MPC · JPL
885923	2019 ST_{32}	—	September 26, 2003	Sacramento Peak	SDSS	·	1.4 km	MPC · JPL
885924	2019 SY_{33}	—	September 25, 2019	Haleakala	Pan-STARRS 1	·	2.3 km	MPC · JPL
885925	2019 SJ_{34}	—	September 25, 2019	Haleakala	Pan-STARRS 1	·	1.7 km	MPC · JPL
885926	2019 SO_{37}	—	September 30, 2019	Haleakala	Pan-STARRS 1	·	1.7 km	MPC · JPL
885927	2019 SQ_{38}	—	August 12, 2013	Haleakala	Pan-STARRS 1	·	1.7 km	MPC · JPL
885928	2019 SS_{40}	—	October 25, 2014	Mount Lemmon	Mount Lemmon Survey	·	1.2 km	MPC · JPL
885929	2019 SV_{44}	—	September 24, 2019	Haleakala	Pan-STARRS 1	·	1.8 km	MPC · JPL
885930	2019 ST_{45}	—	September 27, 2019	Haleakala	Pan-STARRS 1	·	2.2 km	MPC · JPL
885931	2019 SX_{45}	—	October 1, 2008	Mount Lemmon	Mount Lemmon Survey	·	1.9 km	MPC · JPL
885932	2019 SF_{46}	—	September 24, 2019	Haleakala	Pan-STARRS 1	TIR	1.9 km	MPC · JPL
885933	2019 SN_{46}	—	October 29, 2008	Kitt Peak	Spacewatch	·	2.1 km	MPC · JPL
885934	2019 SQ_{46}	—	September 27, 2019	Haleakala	Pan-STARRS 1	(194)	720 m	MPC · JPL
885935	2019 ST_{49}	—	September 20, 2008	Kitt Peak	Spacewatch	·	1.9 km	MPC · JPL
885936	2019 SH_{50}	—	September 26, 2019	Haleakala	Pan-STARRS 1	·	2.0 km	MPC · JPL
885937	2019 SU_{52}	—	April 2, 2016	Haleakala	Pan-STARRS 1	·	2.3 km	MPC · JPL
885938	2019 SG_{53}	—	October 2, 2008	Mount Lemmon	Mount Lemmon Survey	THB	2.1 km	MPC · JPL
885939	2019 SF_{56}	—	September 20, 2019	Catalina	CSS	H	550 m	MPC · JPL
885940	2019 SY_{58}	—	September 5, 2008	Kitt Peak	Spacewatch	·	1.3 km	MPC · JPL
885941	2019 SH_{59}	—	September 26, 2019	Haleakala	Pan-STARRS 1	·	1.8 km	MPC · JPL
885942	2019 SR_{59}	—	March 29, 2016	Cerro Tololo	DECam	ULA	2.9 km	MPC · JPL
885943	2019 SX_{59}	—	December 1, 2003	Socorro	LINEAR	·	2.1 km	MPC · JPL
885944	2019 SR_{60}	—	November 22, 2014	Mount Lemmon	Mount Lemmon Survey	·	1.6 km	MPC · JPL
885945	2019 ST_{60}	—	October 26, 2014	Mount Lemmon	Mount Lemmon Survey	·	1.2 km	MPC · JPL
885946	2019 SA_{62}	—	September 30, 2019	Mount Lemmon	Mount Lemmon Survey	·	1.6 km	MPC · JPL
885947	2019 SJ_{63}	—	March 28, 2016	Cerro Tololo	DECam	·	1.7 km	MPC · JPL
885948	2019 ST_{64}	—	August 9, 2013	Kitt Peak	Spacewatch	·	2.0 km	MPC · JPL
885949	2019 SY_{64}	—	March 13, 2016	Haleakala	Pan-STARRS 1	EUP	2.1 km	MPC · JPL
885950	2019 SQ_{67}	—	September 22, 2019	Mount Lemmon	Mount Lemmon Survey	·	1.3 km	MPC · JPL
885951	2019 SQ_{70}	—	July 24, 2003	Palomar	NEAT	·	1.1 km	MPC · JPL
885952	2019 SX_{71}	—	September 29, 2019	Mount Lemmon	Mount Lemmon Survey	·	1.7 km	MPC · JPL
885953	2019 SZ_{84}	—	April 2, 2016	Haleakala	Pan-STARRS 1	(895)	2.1 km	MPC · JPL
885954	2019 SB_{85}	—	September 24, 2019	Haleakala	Pan-STARRS 1	·	2.0 km	MPC · JPL
885955	2019 SC_{87}	—	September 24, 2019	Haleakala	Pan-STARRS 1	EOS	1.1 km	MPC · JPL
885956	2019 SB_{91}	—	September 25, 2019	Haleakala	Pan-STARRS 1	T_{j} (2.99)	2.4 km	MPC · JPL
885957	2019 SE_{92}	—	September 24, 2019	Haleakala	Pan-STARRS 1	·	2.0 km	MPC · JPL
885958	2019 SB_{95}	—	November 17, 2014	Haleakala	Pan-STARRS 1	·	2.1 km	MPC · JPL
885959	2019 SD_{97}	—	September 26, 2019	Haleakala	Pan-STARRS 1	·	1.9 km	MPC · JPL
885960	2019 SS_{105}	—	July 14, 2013	Haleakala	Pan-STARRS 1	·	1.9 km	MPC · JPL
885961	2019 SV_{112}	—	September 25, 2019	Haleakala	Pan-STARRS 1	·	1.8 km	MPC · JPL
885962	2019 SF_{115}	—	September 27, 2019	Haleakala	Pan-STARRS 1	·	2.0 km	MPC · JPL
885963	2019 SJ_{117}	—	January 3, 2016	Mount Lemmon	Mount Lemmon Survey	·	890 m	MPC · JPL
885964	2019 SX_{117}	—	December 4, 2015	Haleakala	Pan-STARRS 1	·	720 m	MPC · JPL
885965	2019 SO_{119}	—	April 4, 2016	Mount Lemmon	Mount Lemmon Survey	URS	2.0 km	MPC · JPL
885966	2019 SL_{120}	—	September 30, 2019	Mount Lemmon	Mount Lemmon Survey	·	940 m	MPC · JPL
885967	2019 SB_{121}	—	July 8, 2013	Haleakala	Pan-STARRS 1	·	1.7 km	MPC · JPL
885968	2019 SF_{133}	—	September 30, 2019	Haleakala	Pan-STARRS 1	·	1.1 km	MPC · JPL
885969	2019 SD_{136}	—	September 28, 2019	Mount Lemmon	Mount Lemmon Survey	AEG	1.7 km	MPC · JPL
885970	2019 SS_{136}	—	September 22, 2019	Haleakala	Pan-STARRS 1	T_{j} (2.99) · EUP	1.9 km	MPC · JPL
885971	2019 SV_{136}	—	September 19, 2019	Mount Lemmon	Mount Lemmon Survey	·	1.7 km	MPC · JPL
885972	2019 SS_{141}	—	September 30, 2019	Mount Lemmon	Mount Lemmon Survey	·	2.1 km	MPC · JPL
885973	2019 SA_{143}	—	June 11, 2019	Haleakala	Pan-STARRS 1	EUN	1.1 km	MPC · JPL
885974	2019 SG_{144}	—	September 28, 2019	Mount Lemmon	Mount Lemmon Survey	·	700 m	MPC · JPL
885975	2019 SN_{151}	—	September 27, 2019	Cerro Paranal	Gaia Ground Based Optical Tracking	·	1.4 km	MPC · JPL
885976	2019 SO_{151}	—	September 27, 2019	Haleakala	Pan-STARRS 1	·	1.5 km	MPC · JPL
885977	2019 SE_{168}	—	September 27, 2019	Haleakala	Pan-STARRS 1	·	2.4 km	MPC · JPL
885978	2019 SP_{168}	—	April 9, 2010	WISE	WISE	·	2.0 km	MPC · JPL
885979	2019 SP_{175}	—	September 27, 2019	Haleakala	Pan-STARRS 1	·	2.0 km	MPC · JPL
885980	2019 SB_{183}	—	September 29, 2019	Haleakala	Pan-STARRS 1	·	1.0 km	MPC · JPL
885981	2019 ST_{186}	—	February 12, 2018	Haleakala	Pan-STARRS 1	H	290 m	MPC · JPL
885982	2019 SE_{188}	—	September 19, 2019	Mount Lemmon	Mount Lemmon Survey	·	1.4 km	MPC · JPL
885983	2019 SM_{194}	—	September 29, 2019	Mount Lemmon	Mount Lemmon Survey	·	2.3 km	MPC · JPL
885984	2019 SY_{194}	—	March 16, 2012	Mount Lemmon	Mount Lemmon Survey	·	1.2 km	MPC · JPL
885985	2019 SP_{205}	—	September 29, 2019	Mount Lemmon	Mount Lemmon Survey	·	1.8 km	MPC · JPL
885986	2019 SB_{207}	—	September 27, 2019	Haleakala	Pan-STARRS 1	·	2.0 km	MPC · JPL
885987	2019 SQ_{208}	—	March 4, 2017	Haleakala	Pan-STARRS 1	·	1.8 km	MPC · JPL
885988	2019 SJ_{210}	—	September 24, 2019	Haleakala	Pan-STARRS 1	·	2.2 km	MPC · JPL
885989	2019 SW_{217}	—	June 12, 2013	Mount Lemmon	Mount Lemmon Survey	·	2.1 km	MPC · JPL
885990	2019 SM_{247}	—	September 29, 2019	Subaru Telescope,	Subaru Telescope	·	1.3 km	MPC · JPL
885991	2019 SR_{250}	—	September 26, 2019	Haleakala	Pan-STARRS 1	·	1.4 km	MPC · JPL
885992	2019 TP_{1}	—	October 3, 2019	Mount Lemmon	Mount Lemmon Survey	APO · PHA	210 m	MPC · JPL
885993	2019 TY_{7}	—	March 15, 2015	Haleakala	Pan-STARRS 1	T_{j} (2.9)	2.4 km	MPC · JPL
885994	2019 TN_{10}	—	October 6, 2019	Haleakala	Pan-STARRS 1	·	1.8 km	MPC · JPL
885995	2019 TY_{10}	—	November 30, 2003	Kitt Peak	Spacewatch	·	1.9 km	MPC · JPL
885996	2019 TX_{11}	—	October 1, 2019	Haleakala	Pan-STARRS 1	·	2.0 km	MPC · JPL
885997	2019 TQ_{12}	—	April 3, 2016	Haleakala	Pan-STARRS 1	·	2.4 km	MPC · JPL
885998	2019 TX_{12}	—	November 24, 2002	Palomar	NEAT	EUP	2.8 km	MPC · JPL
885999	2019 TX_{13}	—	August 14, 2013	Haleakala	Pan-STARRS 1	·	1.8 km	MPC · JPL
886000	2019 TY_{15}	—	September 27, 2008	Mount Lemmon	Mount Lemmon Survey	·	2.0 km	MPC · JPL

back to top

== See also ==
- Meanings of minor-planet names: 885001–886000
