= List of minor planets: 894001–895000 =

The following is a partial list of minor planets, running from minor-planet number 894001 through 895000, inclusive. The primary data for this and other partial lists is based on JPL's "Small-Body Orbital Elements" and data available from the Minor Planet Center. Critical list information is also provided by the MPC, unless otherwise specified from Lowell Observatory. A detailed description of the table's columns and additional sources are given on the main page including a complete list of every page in this series, and a statistical break-up on the dynamical classification of minor planets.

Also see the summary list of all named bodies in numerical and alphabetical order, and the corresponding naming citations for the number range of this particular list. New namings may only be added to this list after official publication, as the preannouncement of names is condemned by the Working Group for Small Bodies Nomenclature of the International Astronomical Union.

Near-Earth obj.	MBA (inner)	MBA (outer)	Centaur
Mars-crosser	MBA (middle)	Jupiter trojan	Trans-Neptunian obj.
Unclassified

== 894001–894100 ==
Designation			Discovery			Properties		Ref
Permanent	Provisional	Named after	Date	Site	Discoverer(s)	Category	Diam.	Ref
894001	2017 AA_{52}	—	January 3, 2017	Haleakala	Pan-STARRS 1	·	1.4 km	MPC · JPL
894002	2017 AY_{54}	—	January 2, 2017	Haleakala	Pan-STARRS 1	·	1.4 km	MPC · JPL
894003	2017 AR_{55}	—	January 4, 2017	Haleakala	Pan-STARRS 1	JUN	650 m	MPC · JPL
894004	2017 AS_{55}	—	January 3, 2017	Haleakala	Pan-STARRS 1	·	1.2 km	MPC · JPL
894005	2017 AZ_{55}	—	January 4, 2017	Haleakala	Pan-STARRS 1	·	1.3 km	MPC · JPL
894006	2017 AT_{63}	—	January 2, 2017	Subaru Telescope,	Subaru Telescope	·	910 m	MPC · JPL
894007	2017 BE	—	March 13, 2013	Palomar	Palomar Transient Factory	·	960 m	MPC · JPL
894008	2017 BL	—	September 21, 2016	Haleakala	Pan-STARRS 1	·	1.4 km	MPC · JPL
894009	2017 BL_{10}	—	January 7, 2006	Kitt Peak	Spacewatch	TIR	1.8 km	MPC · JPL
894010	2017 BU_{11}	—	January 24, 2017	GINOP-KHK, Piszk\'	K. Sárneczky	·	1.2 km	MPC · JPL
894011	2017 BD_{13}	—	January 5, 2017	Mount Lemmon	Mount Lemmon Survey	·	1.3 km	MPC · JPL
894012	2017 BF_{14}	—	December 16, 2007	Kitt Peak	Spacewatch	·	990 m	MPC · JPL
894013	2017 BQ_{14}	—	March 18, 2013	Mount Lemmon	Mount Lemmon Survey	MIS	1.8 km	MPC · JPL
894014	2017 BM_{20}	—	July 19, 2015	Haleakala	Pan-STARRS 1	ADE	1.4 km	MPC · JPL
894015	2017 BY_{22}	—	September 23, 2015	Haleakala	Pan-STARRS 1	·	1.3 km	MPC · JPL
894016	2017 BP_{25}	—	December 6, 2016	Nogales	M. Schwartz, P. R. Holvorcem	EUN	960 m	MPC · JPL
894017	2017 BW_{33}	—	December 29, 2016	Ouka{\"\i}meden	C. Rinner	T_{j} (2.99)	2.5 km	MPC · JPL
894018	2017 BT_{34}	—	January 26, 2017	Mount Lemmon	Mount Lemmon Survey	·	1.3 km	MPC · JPL
894019	2017 BC_{38}	—	December 23, 2016	Haleakala	Pan-STARRS 1	·	1.5 km	MPC · JPL
894020	2017 BW_{39}	—	November 10, 2016	Haleakala	Pan-STARRS 1	·	1.1 km	MPC · JPL
894021	2017 BJ_{44}	—	October 3, 2015	Mount Lemmon	Mount Lemmon Survey	WIT	700 m	MPC · JPL
894022	2017 BT_{46}	—	March 13, 2013	Palomar	Palomar Transient Factory	·	1.1 km	MPC · JPL
894023	2017 BC_{51}	—	January 26, 2017	Mount Lemmon	Mount Lemmon Survey	AEO	720 m	MPC · JPL
894024	2017 BR_{52}	—	January 11, 2008	Kitt Peak	Spacewatch	·	1.2 km	MPC · JPL
894025	2017 BC_{55}	—	January 13, 2008	Kitt Peak	Spacewatch	·	1.1 km	MPC · JPL
894026	2017 BT_{55}	—	January 26, 2017	Mount Lemmon	Mount Lemmon Survey	URS	2.1 km	MPC · JPL
894027	2017 BV_{60}	—	January 18, 2013	Mount Lemmon	Mount Lemmon Survey	·	730 m	MPC · JPL
894028	2017 BK_{62}	—	March 5, 2013	Catalina	CSS	·	1.3 km	MPC · JPL
894029	2017 BO_{65}	—	January 31, 2009	Kitt Peak	Spacewatch	·	1.1 km	MPC · JPL
894030	2017 BC_{67}	—	January 27, 2017	Mount Lemmon	Mount Lemmon Survey	·	1.2 km	MPC · JPL
894031	2017 BN_{68}	—	January 27, 2017	Mount Lemmon	Mount Lemmon Survey	·	1.2 km	MPC · JPL
894032	2017 BZ_{70}	—	March 1, 2009	Kitt Peak	Spacewatch	(5)	860 m	MPC · JPL
894033	2017 BF_{72}	—	July 27, 2014	Haleakala	Pan-STARRS 1	·	1.9 km	MPC · JPL
894034	2017 BU_{73}	—	August 14, 2015	Haleakala	Pan-STARRS 1	·	500 m	MPC · JPL
894035	2017 BM_{74}	—	January 8, 2017	Mount Lemmon	Mount Lemmon Survey	·	1.1 km	MPC · JPL
894036	2017 BP_{77}	—	March 4, 2013	Haleakala	Pan-STARRS 1	·	1.1 km	MPC · JPL
894037	2017 BB_{78}	—	January 27, 2017	Haleakala	Pan-STARRS 1	·	1.2 km	MPC · JPL
894038	2017 BA_{95}	—	January 27, 2017	Haleakala	Pan-STARRS 1	·	790 m	MPC · JPL
894039	2017 BJ_{100}	—	October 9, 2015	Haleakala	Pan-STARRS 1	·	2.2 km	MPC · JPL
894040	2017 BT_{102}	—	October 10, 2007	Mount Lemmon	Mount Lemmon Survey	·	990 m	MPC · JPL
894041	2017 BY_{102}	—	January 29, 2017	Mount Lemmon	Mount Lemmon Survey	·	1.0 km	MPC · JPL
894042	2017 BJ_{106}	—	December 5, 2016	Mount Lemmon	Mount Lemmon Survey	·	1.2 km	MPC · JPL
894043	2017 BR_{110}	—	January 2, 2017	Haleakala	Pan-STARRS 1	·	1.5 km	MPC · JPL
894044	2017 BX_{111}	—	January 9, 2017	Mount Lemmon	Mount Lemmon Survey	·	1.3 km	MPC · JPL
894045	2017 BF_{113}	—	December 8, 2016	Mount Lemmon	Mount Lemmon Survey	·	1.4 km	MPC · JPL
894046	2017 BZ_{116}	—	January 30, 2017	Haleakala	Pan-STARRS 1	·	410 m	MPC · JPL
894047	2017 BK_{121}	—	November 17, 2011	Catalina	CSS	·	1.6 km	MPC · JPL
894048	2017 BM_{123}	—	January 31, 2017	Haleakala	Pan-STARRS 1	APO · fast	60 m	MPC · JPL
894049	2017 BN_{127}	—	February 5, 2013	Kitt Peak	Spacewatch	·	1.2 km	MPC · JPL
894050	2017 BO_{129}	—	January 29, 2017	Haleakala	Pan-STARRS 1	ADE	1.3 km	MPC · JPL
894051	2017 BU_{131}	—	January 4, 2017	Haleakala	Pan-STARRS 1	·	1.4 km	MPC · JPL
894052	2017 BU_{142}	—	February 13, 2008	Kitt Peak	Spacewatch	JUN	680 m	MPC · JPL
894053	2017 BB_{144}	—	January 28, 2017	Haleakala	Pan-STARRS 1	·	1.4 km	MPC · JPL
894054	2017 BX_{145}	—	January 26, 2017	Haleakala	Pan-STARRS 1	·	1.2 km	MPC · JPL
894055	2017 BA_{146}	—	January 26, 2017	Mount Lemmon	Mount Lemmon Survey	HNS	790 m	MPC · JPL
894056	2017 BM_{146}	—	February 28, 2008	Kitt Peak	Spacewatch	·	1.1 km	MPC · JPL
894057	2017 BC_{152}	—	January 27, 2017	Mount Lemmon	Mount Lemmon Survey	·	1.3 km	MPC · JPL
894058	2017 BN_{152}	—	January 26, 2017	Haleakala	Pan-STARRS 1	·	1.5 km	MPC · JPL
894059	2017 BW_{153}	—	January 27, 2017	Mount Lemmon	Mount Lemmon Survey	PHO	690 m	MPC · JPL
894060	2017 BK_{156}	—	January 28, 2017	Haleakala	Pan-STARRS 1	·	1.5 km	MPC · JPL
894061	2017 BJ_{158}	—	January 29, 2017	Mount Lemmon	Mount Lemmon Survey	·	1.8 km	MPC · JPL
894062	2017 BZ_{160}	—	January 26, 2017	Mount Lemmon	Mount Lemmon Survey	·	1.2 km	MPC · JPL
894063	2017 BQ_{161}	—	January 29, 2017	Haleakala	Pan-STARRS 1	·	1.1 km	MPC · JPL
894064	2017 BP_{164}	—	January 28, 2017	Haleakala	Pan-STARRS 1	·	2.2 km	MPC · JPL
894065	2017 BQ_{167}	—	January 19, 2017	Mount Lemmon	Mount Lemmon Survey	·	1.2 km	MPC · JPL
894066	2017 BX_{168}	—	January 27, 2017	Mount Lemmon	Mount Lemmon Survey	·	1.4 km	MPC · JPL
894067	2017 BL_{169}	—	January 28, 2017	Haleakala	Pan-STARRS 1	AEO	850 m	MPC · JPL
894068	2017 BT_{170}	—	January 31, 2017	Mount Lemmon	Mount Lemmon Survey	·	1.0 km	MPC · JPL
894069	2017 BV_{170}	—	January 29, 2017	Haleakala	Pan-STARRS 1	·	1.2 km	MPC · JPL
894070	2017 BL_{171}	—	January 19, 2017	Mount Lemmon	Mount Lemmon Survey	HNS	890 m	MPC · JPL
894071	2017 BU_{178}	—	January 27, 2017	Haleakala	Pan-STARRS 1	·	1.3 km	MPC · JPL
894072	2017 BX_{178}	—	January 27, 2017	Mount Lemmon	Mount Lemmon Survey	·	1.1 km	MPC · JPL
894073	2017 BT_{180}	—	January 28, 2017	Haleakala	Pan-STARRS 1	·	1.6 km	MPC · JPL
894074	2017 BE_{183}	—	January 31, 2017	Haleakala	Pan-STARRS 1	JUN	600 m	MPC · JPL
894075	2017 BY_{184}	—	January 27, 2017	Haleakala	Pan-STARRS 1	·	1.2 km	MPC · JPL
894076	2017 BN_{188}	—	January 26, 2017	Haleakala	Pan-STARRS 1	·	1.4 km	MPC · JPL
894077	2017 BA_{189}	—	January 26, 2017	Haleakala	Pan-STARRS 1	·	1.3 km	MPC · JPL
894078	2017 BN_{189}	—	January 26, 2017	Haleakala	Pan-STARRS 1	·	1.0 km	MPC · JPL
894079	2017 BK_{192}	—	January 26, 2017	Haleakala	Pan-STARRS 1	·	490 m	MPC · JPL
894080	2017 BD_{195}	—	January 20, 2017	Haleakala	Pan-STARRS 1	·	910 m	MPC · JPL
894081	2017 BO_{200}	—	January 27, 2017	Haleakala	Pan-STARRS 1	·	1.3 km	MPC · JPL
894082	2017 BP_{200}	—	December 29, 2011	Mount Lemmon	Mount Lemmon Survey	(18466)	1.2 km	MPC · JPL
894083	2017 BJ_{204}	—	October 21, 2006	Mount Lemmon	Mount Lemmon Survey	·	1.3 km	MPC · JPL
894084	2017 BZ_{205}	—	January 13, 2008	Kitt Peak	Spacewatch	·	1.3 km	MPC · JPL
894085	2017 BJ_{206}	—	January 30, 2017	Haleakala	Pan-STARRS 1	·	1.2 km	MPC · JPL
894086	2017 BL_{206}	—	January 27, 2017	Haleakala	Pan-STARRS 1	HYG	1.9 km	MPC · JPL
894087	2017 BQ_{207}	—	January 26, 2017	Haleakala	Pan-STARRS 1	·	1.4 km	MPC · JPL
894088	2017 BF_{208}	—	January 31, 2017	Mount Lemmon	Mount Lemmon Survey	EUN	880 m	MPC · JPL
894089	2017 BY_{210}	—	January 26, 2017	Haleakala	Pan-STARRS 1	V	380 m	MPC · JPL
894090	2017 BE_{212}	—	January 20, 2017	Haleakala	Pan-STARRS 1	·	710 m	MPC · JPL
894091	2017 BH_{212}	—	January 26, 2017	Mount Lemmon	Mount Lemmon Survey	·	1.0 km	MPC · JPL
894092	2017 BA_{256}	—	January 27, 2017	Haleakala	Pan-STARRS 1	·	1.1 km	MPC · JPL
894093	2017 BV_{257}	—	January 29, 2017	Haleakala	Pan-STARRS 1	·	1.2 km	MPC · JPL
894094	2017 BA_{266}	—	January 27, 2017	Haleakala	Pan-STARRS 1	·	1.3 km	MPC · JPL
894095	2017 CC_{6}	—	June 24, 2014	Haleakala	Pan-STARRS 1	·	1.2 km	MPC · JPL
894096	2017 CZ_{6}	—	March 15, 2013	Kitt Peak	Spacewatch	·	960 m	MPC · JPL
894097	2017 CR_{8}	—	August 21, 2015	Haleakala	Pan-STARRS 1	·	1.3 km	MPC · JPL
894098	2017 CP_{16}	—	January 27, 2017	Haleakala	Pan-STARRS 1	·	1.4 km	MPC · JPL
894099	2017 CH_{17}	—	January 28, 2017	Haleakala	Pan-STARRS 1	·	940 m	MPC · JPL
894100	2017 CO_{18}	—	September 12, 2015	Haleakala	Pan-STARRS 1	(12739)	970 m	MPC · JPL

== 894101–894200 ==
back to top

Designation			Discovery			Properties		Ref
Permanent	Provisional	Named after	Date	Site	Discoverer(s)	Category	Diam.	Ref
894101	2017 CR_{24}	—	November 24, 2011	Mount Lemmon	Mount Lemmon Survey	·	1.0 km	MPC · JPL
894102	2017 CM_{28}	—	February 3, 2017	Mount Lemmon	Mount Lemmon Survey	·	1.2 km	MPC · JPL
894103	2017 CZ_{29}	—	August 23, 2014	Haleakala	Pan-STARRS 1	·	1.2 km	MPC · JPL
894104	2017 CB_{32}	—	February 3, 2017	Haleakala	Pan-STARRS 1	·	550 m	MPC · JPL
894105	2017 CS_{37}	—	January 4, 2017	Mount Lemmon	Mount Lemmon Survey	LIX	2.5 km	MPC · JPL
894106	2017 CO_{38}	—	February 2, 2017	Haleakala	Pan-STARRS 1	·	2.3 km	MPC · JPL
894107	2017 CB_{39}	—	February 3, 2017	Mount Lemmon	Mount Lemmon Survey	·	1.3 km	MPC · JPL
894108	2017 CN_{40}	—	February 1, 2017	Mount Lemmon	Mount Lemmon Survey	L5	7.7 km	MPC · JPL
894109	2017 CM_{42}	—	February 4, 2017	Haleakala	Pan-STARRS 1	·	1.4 km	MPC · JPL
894110	2017 CQ_{43}	—	February 1, 2017	Haleakala	Pan-STARRS 1	·	1.4 km	MPC · JPL
894111	2017 CG_{46}	—	February 2, 2017	Haleakala	Pan-STARRS 1	EUN	1.0 km	MPC · JPL
894112	2017 DT_{1}	—	February 1, 2017	Mount Lemmon	Mount Lemmon Survey	·	1.6 km	MPC · JPL
894113	2017 DG_{14}	—	October 15, 2015	Haleakala	Pan-STARRS 1	·	1.4 km	MPC · JPL
894114	2017 DR_{16}	—	July 24, 2015	Haleakala	Pan-STARRS 1	·	860 m	MPC · JPL
894115	2017 DO_{18}	—	January 27, 2017	Mount Lemmon	Mount Lemmon Survey	·	900 m	MPC · JPL
894116	2017 DU_{22}	—	April 20, 2013	Kitt Peak	Spacewatch	DOR	1.3 km	MPC · JPL
894117	2017 DZ_{25}	—	February 17, 2013	Mount Lemmon	Mount Lemmon Survey	·	1.1 km	MPC · JPL
894118	2017 DJ_{34}	—	February 21, 2017	Mount Lemmon	Mount Lemmon Survey	AMO	200 m	MPC · JPL
894119	2017 DD_{39}	—	May 8, 2014	Haleakala	Pan-STARRS 1	·	410 m	MPC · JPL
894120	2017 DT_{39}	—	January 27, 2017	Haleakala	Pan-STARRS 1	·	920 m	MPC · JPL
894121	2017 DT_{40}	—	August 3, 2014	Haleakala	Pan-STARRS 1	·	1.2 km	MPC · JPL
894122	2017 DX_{43}	—	January 23, 2011	Mount Lemmon	Mount Lemmon Survey	THM	1.5 km	MPC · JPL
894123	2017 DJ_{44}	—	September 12, 2015	Haleakala	Pan-STARRS 1	·	1.2 km	MPC · JPL
894124	2017 DX_{44}	—	March 21, 2010	Mount Lemmon	Mount Lemmon Survey	·	610 m	MPC · JPL
894125	2017 DK_{48}	—	August 21, 2015	Haleakala	Pan-STARRS 1	·	1.8 km	MPC · JPL
894126	2017 DG_{50}	—	February 21, 2017	Mount Lemmon	Mount Lemmon Survey	·	1.3 km	MPC · JPL
894127	2017 DQ_{53}	—	March 7, 2008	Kitt Peak	Spacewatch	·	1.1 km	MPC · JPL
894128	2017 DM_{54}	—	January 27, 2017	Haleakala	Pan-STARRS 1	AGN	840 m	MPC · JPL
894129	2017 DP_{56}	—	February 21, 2017	Mount Lemmon	Mount Lemmon Survey	PHO	730 m	MPC · JPL
894130	2017 DL_{70}	—	February 21, 2017	Haleakala	Pan-STARRS 1	·	1.4 km	MPC · JPL
894131	2017 DV_{74}	—	February 21, 2017	Haleakala	Pan-STARRS 1	·	770 m	MPC · JPL
894132	2017 DV_{88}	—	January 27, 2017	Haleakala	Pan-STARRS 1	HNS	840 m	MPC · JPL
894133	2017 DV_{89}	—	January 26, 2017	Haleakala	Pan-STARRS 1	·	1.1 km	MPC · JPL
894134	2017 DL_{90}	—	February 22, 2017	Mount Lemmon	Mount Lemmon Survey	·	1.1 km	MPC · JPL
894135	2017 DK_{91}	—	February 4, 2017	Haleakala	Pan-STARRS 1	·	1.4 km	MPC · JPL
894136	2017 DA_{92}	—	February 5, 2011	Haleakala	Pan-STARRS 1	·	2.1 km	MPC · JPL
894137	2017 DB_{92}	—	February 17, 2017	Haleakala	Pan-STARRS 1	·	1.2 km	MPC · JPL
894138	2017 DJ_{108}	—	February 18, 2010	Mount Lemmon	Mount Lemmon Survey	·	700 m	MPC · JPL
894139	2017 DT_{111}	—	October 24, 2011	Haleakala	Pan-STARRS 1	·	950 m	MPC · JPL
894140	2017 DP_{112}	—	February 25, 2017	Mount Lemmon	Mount Lemmon Survey	·	1.5 km	MPC · JPL
894141	2017 DT_{124}	—	February 17, 2017	Haleakala	Pan-STARRS 1	·	1.5 km	MPC · JPL
894142	2017 DU_{126}	—	March 8, 2008	Kitt Peak	Spacewatch	·	1.4 km	MPC · JPL
894143	2017 DF_{128}	—	February 23, 2017	Mount Lemmon	Mount Lemmon Survey	·	1.4 km	MPC · JPL
894144	2017 DR_{128}	—	February 21, 2017	Mount Lemmon	Mount Lemmon Survey	·	410 m	MPC · JPL
894145	2017 DK_{129}	—	February 24, 2017	Haleakala	Pan-STARRS 1	HNS	700 m	MPC · JPL
894146	2017 DQ_{134}	—	February 21, 2017	Mount Lemmon	Mount Lemmon Survey	DOR	1.5 km	MPC · JPL
894147	2017 DY_{135}	—	February 21, 2017	Mount Lemmon	Mount Lemmon Survey	DOR	1.5 km	MPC · JPL
894148	2017 DN_{138}	—	February 22, 2017	Mount Lemmon	Mount Lemmon Survey	·	870 m	MPC · JPL
894149	2017 DY_{140}	—	February 24, 2017	Haleakala	Pan-STARRS 1	·	1.1 km	MPC · JPL
894150	2017 DH_{142}	—	February 22, 2017	Haleakala	Pan-STARRS 1	·	1.3 km	MPC · JPL
894151	2017 DH_{145}	—	February 22, 2017	Mount Lemmon	Mount Lemmon Survey	·	600 m	MPC · JPL
894152	2017 DT_{177}	—	February 21, 2017	Haleakala	Pan-STARRS 1	·	1.3 km	MPC · JPL
894153	2017 ES_{2}	—	March 4, 2017	Haleakala	Pan-STARRS 1	APO	480 m	MPC · JPL
894154	2017 EV_{5}	—	March 13, 2008	Kitt Peak	Spacewatch	·	1.4 km	MPC · JPL
894155	2017 EV_{8}	—	February 11, 2008	Mount Lemmon	Mount Lemmon Survey	·	1.3 km	MPC · JPL
894156	2017 EX_{14}	—	February 22, 2017	Mount Lemmon	Mount Lemmon Survey	·	1.2 km	MPC · JPL
894157	2017 EF_{20}	—	November 17, 2011	Kitt Peak	Spacewatch	·	1.2 km	MPC · JPL
894158	2017 EP_{29}	—	March 4, 2017	Haleakala	Pan-STARRS 1	·	670 m	MPC · JPL
894159	2017 EW_{31}	—	March 4, 2017	Kitt Peak	Spacewatch	KOR	920 m	MPC · JPL
894160	2017 EE_{32}	—	March 5, 2017	Haleakala	Pan-STARRS 1	·	920 m	MPC · JPL
894161	2017 EH_{32}	—	March 5, 2017	Haleakala	Pan-STARRS 1	·	600 m	MPC · JPL
894162	2017 EP_{33}	—	March 5, 2017	Haleakala	Pan-STARRS 1	DOR	1.9 km	MPC · JPL
894163	2017 EF_{35}	—	March 7, 2017	Haleakala	Pan-STARRS 1	·	1.6 km	MPC · JPL
894164	2017 EC_{41}	—	March 7, 2017	Haleakala	Pan-STARRS 1	BRA	1 km	MPC · JPL
894165	2017 EK_{41}	—	March 2, 2017	Mount Lemmon	Mount Lemmon Survey	·	1.4 km	MPC · JPL
894166	2017 EA_{47}	—	September 30, 2010	Mount Lemmon	Mount Lemmon Survey	·	1.2 km	MPC · JPL
894167	2017 FN_{11}	—	January 28, 2017	Haleakala	Pan-STARRS 1	·	1.1 km	MPC · JPL
894168	2017 FX_{11}	—	February 22, 2017	Mount Lemmon	Mount Lemmon Survey	·	1.4 km	MPC · JPL
894169	2017 FU_{27}	—	January 24, 2012	Haleakala	Pan-STARRS 1	·	1.3 km	MPC · JPL
894170	2017 FZ_{59}	—	March 4, 2017	Haleakala	Pan-STARRS 1	DOR	1.6 km	MPC · JPL
894171	2017 FP_{73}	—	January 26, 2012	Haleakala	Pan-STARRS 1	(18466)	1.7 km	MPC · JPL
894172	2017 FA_{85}	—	March 7, 2017	Mount Lemmon	Mount Lemmon Survey	·	950 m	MPC · JPL
894173	2017 FJ_{90}	—	March 21, 2017	Haleakala	Pan-STARRS 1	APO	500 m	MPC · JPL
894174	2017 FV_{107}	—	April 4, 2008	Mount Lemmon	Mount Lemmon Survey	·	1.2 km	MPC · JPL
894175	2017 FY_{109}	—	February 1, 2006	Kitt Peak	Spacewatch	EOS	1.3 km	MPC · JPL
894176	2017 FY_{122}	—	March 7, 2017	Haleakala	Pan-STARRS 1	·	1.8 km	MPC · JPL
894177	2017 FD_{131}	—	May 7, 2006	Kitt Peak	Spacewatch	NYS	700 m	MPC · JPL
894178	2017 FV_{134}	—	July 31, 2000	Cerro Tololo	Deep Ecliptic Survey	·	660 m	MPC · JPL
894179	2017 FX_{137}	—	March 1, 2008	Kitt Peak	Spacewatch	·	1.1 km	MPC · JPL
894180	2017 FZ_{145}	—	March 27, 2017	Haleakala	Pan-STARRS 1	·	1.8 km	MPC · JPL
894181	2017 FT_{154}	—	March 4, 2017	Haleakala	Pan-STARRS 1	GEF	890 m	MPC · JPL
894182	2017 FJ_{169}	—	March 21, 2017	Haleakala	Pan-STARRS 1	·	2.2 km	MPC · JPL
894183	2017 FL_{170}	—	March 19, 2017	Mount Lemmon	Mount Lemmon Survey	·	1.2 km	MPC · JPL
894184	2017 FS_{170}	—	March 29, 2017	Haleakala	Pan-STARRS 1	·	1.7 km	MPC · JPL
894185	2017 FU_{172}	—	March 26, 2017	Mount Lemmon	Mount Lemmon Survey	·	1.2 km	MPC · JPL
894186	2017 FJ_{181}	—	March 18, 2017	Mount Lemmon	Mount Lemmon Survey	·	1.4 km	MPC · JPL
894187	2017 FP_{183}	—	March 21, 2017	Mount Lemmon	Mount Lemmon Survey	·	1.4 km	MPC · JPL
894188	2017 FQ_{183}	—	March 19, 2017	Haleakala	Pan-STARRS 1	EUN	750 m	MPC · JPL
894189	2017 FR_{183}	—	March 18, 2017	Haleakala	Pan-STARRS 1	·	1.3 km	MPC · JPL
894190	2017 FU_{185}	—	March 20, 2017	Haleakala	Pan-STARRS 1	·	1.6 km	MPC · JPL
894191	2017 FN_{187}	—	March 18, 2017	Haleakala	Pan-STARRS 1	·	1.4 km	MPC · JPL
894192	2017 FF_{190}	—	March 19, 2017	Haleakala	Pan-STARRS 1	·	840 m	MPC · JPL
894193	2017 FM_{211}	—	March 21, 2017	Haleakala	Pan-STARRS 1	·	1.4 km	MPC · JPL
894194	2017 FY_{223}	—	March 21, 2017	Haleakala	Pan-STARRS 1	HOF	1.8 km	MPC · JPL
894195	2017 GN_{10}	—	February 16, 2013	Mount Lemmon	Mount Lemmon Survey	NYS	940 m	MPC · JPL
894196	2017 GD_{11}	—	April 5, 2017	Haleakala	Pan-STARRS 1	PHO	710 m	MPC · JPL
894197	2017 GX_{15}	—	April 1, 2017	Haleakala	Pan-STARRS 1	·	1.5 km	MPC · JPL
894198	2017 GE_{16}	—	April 1, 2017	Haleakala	Pan-STARRS 1	·	460 m	MPC · JPL
894199	2017 GP_{17}	—	April 3, 2017	Haleakala	Pan-STARRS 1	·	2.2 km	MPC · JPL
894200	2017 GS_{19}	—	April 6, 2017	Mount Lemmon	Mount Lemmon Survey	·	1.4 km	MPC · JPL

== 894201–894300 ==
back to top

Designation			Discovery			Properties		Ref
Permanent	Provisional	Named after	Date	Site	Discoverer(s)	Category	Diam.	Ref
894201	2017 GE_{22}	—	April 1, 2017	Haleakala	Pan-STARRS 1	·	1.4 km	MPC · JPL
894202	2017 GK_{22}	—	April 6, 2017	Haleakala	Pan-STARRS 1	H	310 m	MPC · JPL
894203	2017 GE_{23}	—	April 6, 2017	Mount Lemmon	Mount Lemmon Survey	·	1.5 km	MPC · JPL
894204	2017 GB_{29}	—	April 6, 2017	Haleakala	Pan-STARRS 1	H	400 m	MPC · JPL
894205	2017 GW_{29}	—	April 3, 2017	Mount Lemmon	Mount Lemmon Survey	·	1.6 km	MPC · JPL
894206	2017 GR_{31}	—	April 15, 2012	Haleakala	Pan-STARRS 1	·	1.6 km	MPC · JPL
894207	2017 HC_{2}	—	July 23, 2015	Haleakala	Pan-STARRS 1	H	300 m	MPC · JPL
894208	2017 HJ_{3}	—	December 26, 2011	Mount Lemmon	Mount Lemmon Survey	·	310 m	MPC · JPL
894209	2017 HK_{17}	—	April 4, 2003	Kitt Peak	Spacewatch	DOR	1.8 km	MPC · JPL
894210	2017 HP_{20}	—	December 22, 2008	Kitt Peak	Spacewatch	·	870 m	MPC · JPL
894211	2017 HE_{29}	—	September 9, 2015	Haleakala	Pan-STARRS 1	·	500 m	MPC · JPL
894212	2017 HR_{38}	—	February 27, 2012	Haleakala	Pan-STARRS 1	·	1.4 km	MPC · JPL
894213	2017 HY_{63}	—	April 26, 2017	Haleakala	Pan-STARRS 1	·	2.1 km	MPC · JPL
894214	2017 HW_{65}	—	April 17, 2017	Mount Lemmon	Mount Lemmon Survey	·	1.5 km	MPC · JPL
894215	2017 HP_{71}	—	April 16, 2017	Haleakala	Pan-STARRS 1	GEF	810 m	MPC · JPL
894216	2017 HW_{71}	—	April 16, 2017	Mount Lemmon	Mount Lemmon Survey	·	1.3 km	MPC · JPL
894217	2017 HH_{73}	—	April 20, 2017	Haleakala	Pan-STARRS 1	·	1.8 km	MPC · JPL
894218	2017 HN_{81}	—	April 26, 2017	Haleakala	Pan-STARRS 1	·	1.4 km	MPC · JPL
894219	2017 HD_{88}	—	April 16, 2017	Haleakala	Pan-STARRS 1	·	1.6 km	MPC · JPL
894220	2017 HY_{104}	—	April 25, 2017	Haleakala	Pan-STARRS 1	·	1.6 km	MPC · JPL
894221	2017 HT_{106}	—	April 2, 2006	Kitt Peak	Spacewatch	·	850 m	MPC · JPL
894222	2017 HG_{108}	—	April 27, 2017	Haleakala	Pan-STARRS 1	NYS	670 m	MPC · JPL
894223	2017 HZ_{115}	—	September 13, 2013	Kitt Peak	Spacewatch	·	1.8 km	MPC · JPL
894224	2017 JA_{10}	—	May 14, 2017	Mount Lemmon	Mount Lemmon Survey	·	1.4 km	MPC · JPL
894225	2017 JE_{10}	—	May 4, 2017	Haleakala	Pan-STARRS 1	·	1.5 km	MPC · JPL
894226	2017 KX_{1}	—	February 15, 2016	Mount Lemmon	Mount Lemmon Survey	·	2.0 km	MPC · JPL
894227	2017 KD_{9}	—	December 4, 2015	Haleakala	Pan-STARRS 1	·	1.6 km	MPC · JPL
894228	2017 KM_{10}	—	March 7, 2016	Haleakala	Pan-STARRS 1	EOS	1.4 km	MPC · JPL
894229	2017 KE_{33}	—	March 14, 2012	Mount Lemmon	Mount Lemmon Survey	·	1.5 km	MPC · JPL
894230	2017 KH_{39}	—	May 26, 2017	Haleakala	Pan-STARRS 1	H	360 m	MPC · JPL
894231	2017 KP_{47}	—	May 18, 2017	Haleakala	Pan-STARRS 1	BRA	970 m	MPC · JPL
894232	2017 KM_{50}	—	May 21, 2017	Haleakala	Pan-STARRS 1	·	1.8 km	MPC · JPL
894233	2017 MX_{5}	—	June 24, 2017	Haleakala	Pan-STARRS 1	·	2.2 km	MPC · JPL
894234	2017 MQ_{8}	—	June 29, 2017	Mount Lemmon	Mount Lemmon Survey	AMO	240 m	MPC · JPL
894235	2017 MY_{26}	—	January 30, 2011	Kitt Peak	Spacewatch	H	360 m	MPC · JPL
894236	2017 MA_{34}	—	June 24, 2017	Haleakala	Pan-STARRS 1	·	1.8 km	MPC · JPL
894237	2017 MS_{37}	—	January 22, 2015	Haleakala	Pan-STARRS 1	·	2.0 km	MPC · JPL
894238	2017 NE_{14}	—	July 4, 2017	Haleakala	Pan-STARRS 1	·	2.0 km	MPC · JPL
894239	2017 NK_{15}	—	July 5, 2017	Haleakala	Pan-STARRS 1	·	2.2 km	MPC · JPL
894240	2017 OR_{8}	—	June 21, 2017	Haleakala	Pan-STARRS 1	·	690 m	MPC · JPL
894241	2017 OX_{43}	—	September 27, 2013	Piszkéstető	K. Sárneczky	·	670 m	MPC · JPL
894242	2017 OJ_{57}	—	April 11, 2016	Haleakala	Pan-STARRS 1	·	1.8 km	MPC · JPL
894243	2017 OQ_{58}	—	July 30, 2017	Haleakala	Pan-STARRS 1	VER	1.9 km	MPC · JPL
894244	2017 OV_{62}	—	October 2, 2013	Haleakala	Pan-STARRS 1	·	690 m	MPC · JPL
894245	2017 OP_{64}	—	July 30, 2017	Haleakala	Pan-STARRS 1	VER	2.0 km	MPC · JPL
894246	2017 OW_{64}	—	July 30, 2017	Haleakala	Pan-STARRS 1	·	2.1 km	MPC · JPL
894247	2017 ON_{71}	—	July 30, 2017	Haleakala	Pan-STARRS 1	·	820 m	MPC · JPL
894248	2017 OC_{73}	—	July 30, 2017	Haleakala	Pan-STARRS 1	(5)	690 m	MPC · JPL
894249	2017 OX_{77}	—	July 22, 2017	Haleakala	Pan-STARRS 1	·	820 m	MPC · JPL
894250	2017 OX_{78}	—	July 30, 2017	Haleakala	Pan-STARRS 1	·	2.1 km	MPC · JPL
894251	2017 OG_{79}	—	October 17, 2010	Mount Lemmon	Mount Lemmon Survey	V	390 m	MPC · JPL
894252	2017 OD_{85}	—	July 30, 2017	Haleakala	Pan-STARRS 1	·	870 m	MPC · JPL
894253	2017 OM_{87}	—	July 26, 2017	Haleakala	Pan-STARRS 1	·	830 m	MPC · JPL
894254	2017 OW_{87}	—	July 25, 2017	Haleakala	Pan-STARRS 1	·	690 m	MPC · JPL
894255	2017 OW_{92}	—	July 26, 2017	Haleakala	Pan-STARRS 1	·	2.1 km	MPC · JPL
894256	2017 OF_{94}	—	July 25, 2017	Haleakala	Pan-STARRS 1	·	770 m	MPC · JPL
894257	2017 OJ_{103}	—	July 30, 2017	Haleakala	Pan-STARRS 1	·	2.2 km	MPC · JPL
894258	2017 OU_{105}	—	July 26, 2017	Haleakala	Pan-STARRS 1	·	1.9 km	MPC · JPL
894259	2017 OA_{106}	—	July 25, 2017	Haleakala	Pan-STARRS 1	EOS	1.3 km	MPC · JPL
894260	2017 OF_{106}	—	July 25, 2017	Haleakala	Pan-STARRS 1	VER	2.1 km	MPC · JPL
894261	2017 OE_{109}	—	July 26, 2017	Haleakala	Pan-STARRS 1	·	1.1 km	MPC · JPL
894262	2017 OM_{112}	—	October 15, 2007	Mount Lemmon	Mount Lemmon Survey	·	2.1 km	MPC · JPL
894263	2017 OY_{118}	—	July 27, 2017	Haleakala	Pan-STARRS 1	V	410 m	MPC · JPL
894264	2017 OF_{119}	—	July 25, 2017	Haleakala	Pan-STARRS 1	·	540 m	MPC · JPL
894265	2017 OY_{121}	—	July 30, 2017	Haleakala	Pan-STARRS 1	·	1.1 km	MPC · JPL
894266	2017 OH_{129}	—	September 30, 2010	Mount Lemmon	Mount Lemmon Survey	·	630 m	MPC · JPL
894267	2017 OT_{136}	—	July 24, 2017	Haleakala	Pan-STARRS 1	·	640 m	MPC · JPL
894268	2017 OH_{140}	—	January 14, 2016	Haleakala	Pan-STARRS 1	·	470 m	MPC · JPL
894269	2017 OV_{145}	—	July 30, 2017	Haleakala	Pan-STARRS 1	HYG	1.8 km	MPC · JPL
894270	2017 OR_{167}	—	July 24, 2017	Haleakala	Pan-STARRS 1	·	500 m	MPC · JPL
894271	2017 OD_{180}	—	July 26, 2017	Haleakala	Pan-STARRS 1	·	2.4 km	MPC · JPL
894272	2017 OK_{191}	—	July 26, 2017	Haleakala	Pan-STARRS 1	EUN	870 m	MPC · JPL
894273	2017 PV_{2}	—	October 29, 2010	Mount Lemmon	Mount Lemmon Survey	·	740 m	MPC · JPL
894274	2017 PF_{3}	—	February 10, 2011	Mount Lemmon	Mount Lemmon Survey	·	790 m	MPC · JPL
894275	2017 PX_{4}	—	August 1, 2017	Haleakala	Pan-STARRS 1	·	590 m	MPC · JPL
894276	2017 PB_{7}	—	September 13, 2013	Mount Lemmon	Mount Lemmon Survey	·	970 m	MPC · JPL
894277	2017 PE_{16}	—	February 5, 2016	Haleakala	Pan-STARRS 1	·	460 m	MPC · JPL
894278	2017 PY_{28}	—	October 17, 2010	Mount Lemmon	Mount Lemmon Survey	·	620 m	MPC · JPL
894279	2017 PV_{32}	—	February 14, 2016	Haleakala	Pan-STARRS 1	·	2.3 km	MPC · JPL
894280	2017 PN_{34}	—	December 28, 2014	Mount Lemmon	Mount Lemmon Survey	NYS	660 m	MPC · JPL
894281	2017 PN_{37}	—	July 5, 2017	Haleakala	Pan-STARRS 1	EOS	1.2 km	MPC · JPL
894282	2017 PU_{42}	—	August 1, 2017	Haleakala	Pan-STARRS 1	·	850 m	MPC · JPL
894283	2017 PK_{44}	—	August 1, 2017	Haleakala	Pan-STARRS 1	·	2.0 km	MPC · JPL
894284	2017 PP_{51}	—	April 18, 2015	Cerro Tololo-DECam	DECam	·	2.3 km	MPC · JPL
894285	2017 PL_{54}	—	August 4, 2017	Haleakala	Pan-STARRS 1	·	1.0 km	MPC · JPL
894286	2017 PZ_{56}	—	December 15, 2010	Mount Lemmon	Mount Lemmon Survey	·	1.0 km	MPC · JPL
894287	2017 PK_{58}	—	August 15, 2017	Haleakala	Pan-STARRS 1	H	310 m	MPC · JPL
894288	2017 PN_{59}	—	January 22, 2015	Haleakala	Pan-STARRS 1	·	1.7 km	MPC · JPL
894289	2017 PR_{59}	—	August 1, 2017	Haleakala	Pan-STARRS 1	·	2.0 km	MPC · JPL
894290	2017 PF_{61}	—	August 1, 2017	Haleakala	Pan-STARRS 1	·	2.2 km	MPC · JPL
894291	2017 PP_{63}	—	August 1, 2017	Haleakala	Pan-STARRS 1	·	690 m	MPC · JPL
894292	2017 PD_{64}	—	August 1, 2017	Haleakala	Pan-STARRS 1	·	2.2 km	MPC · JPL
894293	2017 PX_{68}	—	August 14, 2017	Haleakala	Pan-STARRS 1	V	480 m	MPC · JPL
894294	2017 QJ_{16}	—	July 26, 2017	Haleakala	Pan-STARRS 1	H	220 m	MPC · JPL
894295	2017 QN_{16}	—	August 17, 2017	Haleakala	Pan-STARRS 1	AMO	160 m	MPC · JPL
894296	2017 QE_{21}	—	February 16, 2013	Mount Lemmon	Mount Lemmon Survey	·	420 m	MPC · JPL
894297	2017 QP_{21}	—	July 25, 2017	Haleakala	Pan-STARRS 1	·	870 m	MPC · JPL
894298	2017 QW_{28}	—	July 25, 2017	Haleakala	Pan-STARRS 1	·	470 m	MPC · JPL
894299	2017 QE_{48}	—	August 1, 2017	Haleakala	Pan-STARRS 1	·	2.0 km	MPC · JPL
894300	2017 QD_{54}	—	March 31, 2013	Mount Lemmon	Mount Lemmon Survey	·	450 m	MPC · JPL

== 894301–894400 ==
back to top

Designation			Discovery			Properties		Ref
Permanent	Provisional	Named after	Date	Site	Discoverer(s)	Category	Diam.	Ref
894301	2017 QP_{59}	—	February 16, 2015	Haleakala	Pan-STARRS 1	·	2.6 km	MPC · JPL
894302	2017 QJ_{66}	—	August 24, 2017	Haleakala	Pan-STARRS 1	·	900 m	MPC · JPL
894303	2017 QU_{69}	—	August 31, 2017	Haleakala	Pan-STARRS 1	·	800 m	MPC · JPL
894304	2017 QJ_{71}	—	August 31, 2017	Haleakala	Pan-STARRS 1	KON	1.4 km	MPC · JPL
894305	2017 QE_{72}	—	August 24, 2017	Haleakala	Pan-STARRS 1	·	450 m	MPC · JPL
894306	2017 QB_{75}	—	September 4, 2007	Mount Lemmon	Mount Lemmon Survey	·	410 m	MPC · JPL
894307	2017 QU_{90}	—	August 17, 2017	Haleakala	Pan-STARRS 1	KON	1.4 km	MPC · JPL
894308	2017 QN_{91}	—	August 18, 2017	Haleakala	Pan-STARRS 1	·	2.1 km	MPC · JPL
894309	2017 QW_{96}	—	August 16, 2017	Haleakala	Pan-STARRS 1	·	750 m	MPC · JPL
894310	2017 QB_{97}	—	November 10, 2013	Mount Lemmon	Mount Lemmon Survey	·	890 m	MPC · JPL
894311	2017 QK_{103}	—	August 23, 2017	Haleakala	Pan-STARRS 1	H	450 m	MPC · JPL
894312	2017 QT_{103}	—	August 23, 2017	Haleakala	Pan-STARRS 1	ADE	1.2 km	MPC · JPL
894313	2017 QV_{103}	—	August 16, 2017	Haleakala	Pan-STARRS 1	·	910 m	MPC · JPL
894314	2017 QX_{103}	—	August 23, 2017	Haleakala	Pan-STARRS 1	EUP	2.2 km	MPC · JPL
894315	2017 QF_{106}	—	August 31, 2017	Haleakala	Pan-STARRS 1	H	280 m	MPC · JPL
894316	2017 QM_{109}	—	August 31, 2017	Haleakala	Pan-STARRS 1	·	2.0 km	MPC · JPL
894317	2017 QF_{110}	—	August 24, 2017	Haleakala	Pan-STARRS 1	·	590 m	MPC · JPL
894318	2017 QH_{112}	—	May 1, 2016	Cerro Tololo-DECam	DECam	·	740 m	MPC · JPL
894319	2017 QM_{113}	—	August 24, 2017	Haleakala	Pan-STARRS 1	·	930 m	MPC · JPL
894320	2017 QH_{127}	—	August 30, 2017	Mount Lemmon	Mount Lemmon Survey	EUN	760 m	MPC · JPL
894321	2017 QM_{129}	—	March 28, 2016	Cerro Tololo-DECam	DECam	RAF	530 m	MPC · JPL
894322	2017 QZ_{130}	—	August 30, 2017	Mount Lemmon	Mount Lemmon Survey	·	760 m	MPC · JPL
894323	2017 QA_{135}	—	August 16, 2017	Haleakala	Pan-STARRS 1	·	450 m	MPC · JPL
894324	2017 QS_{137}	—	August 16, 2017	Haleakala	Pan-STARRS 1	·	630 m	MPC · JPL
894325	2017 QH_{145}	—	August 17, 2017	Haleakala	Pan-STARRS 1	·	510 m	MPC · JPL
894326	2017 QO_{146}	—	August 23, 2017	Haleakala	Pan-STARRS 1	EOS	1.2 km	MPC · JPL
894327	2017 QV_{146}	—	August 18, 2017	Haleakala	Pan-STARRS 1	·	2.1 km	MPC · JPL
894328	2017 QC_{153}	—	August 16, 2017	Haleakala	Pan-STARRS 1	·	2.1 km	MPC · JPL
894329	2017 QM_{181}	—	August 26, 2017	Haleakala	Pan-STARRS 1	·	2.0 km	MPC · JPL
894330	2017 RR_{1}	—	August 23, 2017	Haleakala	Pan-STARRS 1	H	300 m	MPC · JPL
894331	2017 RB_{10}	—	October 7, 2013	Kitt Peak	Spacewatch	·	950 m	MPC · JPL
894332	2017 RO_{10}	—	January 15, 2015	Haleakala	Pan-STARRS 1	·	580 m	MPC · JPL
894333	2017 RT_{11}	—	December 30, 2007	Mount Lemmon	Mount Lemmon Survey	·	480 m	MPC · JPL
894334	2017 RM_{15}	—	September 14, 2017	Haleakala	Pan-STARRS 1	AMO	330 m	MPC · JPL
894335	2017 RU_{19}	—	January 14, 2016	Haleakala	Pan-STARRS 1	·	580 m	MPC · JPL
894336	2017 RR_{24}	—	August 26, 2013	Haleakala	Pan-STARRS 1	·	790 m	MPC · JPL
894337	2017 RN_{35}	—	October 13, 2013	Mount Lemmon	Mount Lemmon Survey	·	970 m	MPC · JPL
894338	2017 RT_{73}	—	August 10, 2007	Kitt Peak	Spacewatch	·	450 m	MPC · JPL
894339	2017 RJ_{81}	—	April 1, 2009	Mount Lemmon	Mount Lemmon Survey	·	1.9 km	MPC · JPL
894340	2017 RE_{84}	—	March 16, 2016	Haleakala	Pan-STARRS 1	·	550 m	MPC · JPL
894341	2017 RR_{87}	—	October 24, 2013	Mount Lemmon	Mount Lemmon Survey	(5)	600 m	MPC · JPL
894342	2017 RM_{105}	—	November 1, 2013	Mount Lemmon	Mount Lemmon Survey	·	1.3 km	MPC · JPL
894343	2017 RN_{109}	—	September 6, 2013	Kitt Peak	Spacewatch	·	730 m	MPC · JPL
894344	2017 RC_{112}	—	September 2, 2017	Haleakala	Pan-STARRS 1	·	1.1 km	MPC · JPL
894345	2017 RX_{113}	—	September 12, 2017	Haleakala	Pan-STARRS 1	H	420 m	MPC · JPL
894346	2017 RJ_{122}	—	September 2, 2017	Haleakala	Pan-STARRS 1	ERI	840 m	MPC · JPL
894347	2017 RT_{122}	—	October 31, 2013	Mount Lemmon	Mount Lemmon Survey	·	830 m	MPC · JPL
894348	2017 RH_{125}	—	September 14, 2017	Haleakala	Pan-STARRS 1	·	1.3 km	MPC · JPL
894349	2017 RO_{129}	—	September 14, 2017	Haleakala	Pan-STARRS 1	·	2.1 km	MPC · JPL
894350	2017 RT_{136}	—	September 14, 2017	Haleakala	Pan-STARRS 1	KON	1.3 km	MPC · JPL
894351	2017 RD_{138}	—	March 31, 2016	Haleakala	Pan-STARRS 1	·	690 m	MPC · JPL
894352	2017 RR_{145}	—	September 1, 2017	Haleakala	Pan-STARRS 1	·	860 m	MPC · JPL
894353	2017 RY_{145}	—	September 15, 2017	Haleakala	Pan-STARRS 1	·	490 m	MPC · JPL
894354	2017 RS_{162}	—	September 15, 2017	Haleakala	Pan-STARRS 1	·	2.8 km	MPC · JPL
894355	2017 RG_{176}	—	September 14, 2017	Haleakala	Pan-STARRS 1	·	2.1 km	MPC · JPL
894356	2017 SZ_{1}	—	August 28, 2013	Mount Lemmon	Mount Lemmon Survey	·	420 m	MPC · JPL
894357	2017 SZ_{3}	—	September 16, 2017	Haleakala	Pan-STARRS 1	PHO	570 m	MPC · JPL
894358	2017 SK_{8}	—	August 22, 2017	Haleakala	Pan-STARRS 1	·	930 m	MPC · JPL
894359	2017 SE_{15}	—	December 7, 2013	Nogales	M. Schwartz, P. R. Holvorcem	·	1.2 km	MPC · JPL
894360	2017 SC_{18}	—	December 30, 2015	Mount Lemmon	Mount Lemmon Survey	H	380 m	MPC · JPL
894361	2017 SC_{31}	—	September 14, 2017	ATLAS-HKO, Haleaka	ATLAS	·	1.3 km	MPC · JPL
894362	2017 SO_{40}	—	October 10, 2012	Haleakala	Pan-STARRS 1	H	350 m	MPC · JPL
894363	2017 SS_{56}	—	December 29, 2014	Haleakala	Pan-STARRS 1	V	390 m	MPC · JPL
894364	2017 SJ_{61}	—	June 5, 2016	Haleakala	Pan-STARRS 1	·	710 m	MPC · JPL
894365	2017 SO_{77}	—	October 31, 2010	Mount Lemmon	Mount Lemmon Survey	·	670 m	MPC · JPL
894366	2017 SK_{100}	—	March 15, 2012	Mount Lemmon	Mount Lemmon Survey	·	560 m	MPC · JPL
894367	2017 SN_{100}	—	September 29, 2005	Mount Lemmon	Mount Lemmon Survey	·	530 m	MPC · JPL
894368	2017 SY_{106}	—	February 7, 2011	Mount Lemmon	Mount Lemmon Survey	·	610 m	MPC · JPL
894369	2017 SX_{109}	—	February 12, 2016	Mount Lemmon	Mount Lemmon Survey	H	250 m	MPC · JPL
894370	2017 SD_{111}	—	September 3, 2013	Mount Lemmon	Mount Lemmon Survey	·	520 m	MPC · JPL
894371	2017 SC_{114}	—	September 23, 2017	Haleakala	Pan-STARRS 1	H	310 m	MPC · JPL
894372	2017 SE_{119}	—	April 4, 2010	Kitt Peak	Spacewatch	·	360 m	MPC · JPL
894373	2017 SV_{123}	—	September 4, 2008	Kitt Peak	Spacewatch	AEO	840 m	MPC · JPL
894374	2017 SH_{136}	—	September 19, 2017	Haleakala	Pan-STARRS 1	ADE	1.2 km	MPC · JPL
894375	2017 SZ_{136}	—	September 17, 2017	Haleakala	Pan-STARRS 1	BRG	1.1 km	MPC · JPL
894376	2017 SR_{141}	—	September 24, 2017	Haleakala	Pan-STARRS 1	RAF	490 m	MPC · JPL
894377	2017 SM_{142}	—	September 24, 2017	Haleakala	Pan-STARRS 1	·	1.0 km	MPC · JPL
894378	2017 SK_{144}	—	September 29, 2017	Haleakala	Pan-STARRS 1	·	700 m	MPC · JPL
894379	2017 SD_{146}	—	September 26, 2017	Haleakala	Pan-STARRS 1	·	1.0 km	MPC · JPL
894380	2017 SN_{146}	—	September 24, 2017	Haleakala	Pan-STARRS 1	PHO	640 m	MPC · JPL
894381	2017 SF_{151}	—	September 24, 2017	Haleakala	Pan-STARRS 1	V	400 m	MPC · JPL
894382	2017 SQ_{156}	—	September 29, 2013	Piszkéstető	K. Sárneczky, S. Kürti	·	750 m	MPC · JPL
894383	2017 SS_{162}	—	May 1, 2016	Cerro Tololo-DECam	DECam	·	730 m	MPC · JPL
894384	2017 SM_{165}	—	September 30, 2017	Haleakala	Pan-STARRS 1	H	280 m	MPC · JPL
894385	2017 SL_{171}	—	September 23, 2017	Haleakala	Pan-STARRS 1	·	730 m	MPC · JPL
894386	2017 SM_{184}	—	September 25, 2017	Haleakala	Pan-STARRS 1	·	990 m	MPC · JPL
894387	2017 SU_{190}	—	April 18, 2015	Cerro Tololo-DECam	DECam	(5)	820 m	MPC · JPL
894388	2017 SQ_{195}	—	September 21, 2017	Haleakala	Pan-STARRS 1	·	1.1 km	MPC · JPL
894389	2017 SS_{205}	—	September 26, 2017	Haleakala	Pan-STARRS 1	AGN	910 m	MPC · JPL
894390	2017 SQ_{210}	—	September 17, 2017	Haleakala	Pan-STARRS 1	HNS	940 m	MPC · JPL
894391	2017 SZ_{216}	—	September 23, 2017	Haleakala	Pan-STARRS 1	·	660 m	MPC · JPL
894392	2017 SA_{220}	—	September 26, 2017	Haleakala	Pan-STARRS 1	·	1.2 km	MPC · JPL
894393	2017 SG_{220}	—	September 24, 2017	Haleakala	Pan-STARRS 1	·	950 m	MPC · JPL
894394	2017 SW_{220}	—	September 24, 2017	Haleakala	Pan-STARRS 1	·	830 m	MPC · JPL
894395	2017 ST_{221}	—	September 26, 2017	Haleakala	Pan-STARRS 1	·	1.1 km	MPC · JPL
894396	2017 SJ_{225}	—	January 22, 2012	Haleakala	Pan-STARRS 1	·	790 m	MPC · JPL
894397	2017 SS_{226}	—	September 21, 2017	Haleakala	Pan-STARRS 1	·	2.4 km	MPC · JPL
894398	2017 SH_{228}	—	September 26, 2017	Haleakala	Pan-STARRS 1	·	1.3 km	MPC · JPL
894399	2017 SK_{228}	—	September 16, 2017	Haleakala	Pan-STARRS 1	EUP	2.3 km	MPC · JPL
894400	2017 SL_{232}	—	September 30, 2017	Haleakala	Pan-STARRS 1	·	1.1 km	MPC · JPL

== 894401–894500 ==
back to top

Designation			Discovery			Properties		Ref
Permanent	Provisional	Named after	Date	Site	Discoverer(s)	Category	Diam.	Ref
894401	2017 SU_{235}	—	September 16, 2017	Haleakala	Pan-STARRS 1	H	390 m	MPC · JPL
894402	2017 SD_{237}	—	September 16, 2017	Haleakala	Pan-STARRS 1	·	1.3 km	MPC · JPL
894403	2017 SS_{237}	—	September 25, 2017	Haleakala	Pan-STARRS 1	·	580 m	MPC · JPL
894404	2017 SY_{239}	—	September 26, 2017	Haleakala	Pan-STARRS 1	H	320 m	MPC · JPL
894405	2017 SV_{241}	—	September 26, 2017	Haleakala	Pan-STARRS 1	H	250 m	MPC · JPL
894406	2017 SJ_{242}	—	September 17, 2017	Haleakala	Pan-STARRS 1	H	300 m	MPC · JPL
894407	2017 SR_{243}	—	February 19, 2015	Haleakala	Pan-STARRS 1	·	1.8 km	MPC · JPL
894408	2017 SJ_{244}	—	September 17, 2017	Haleakala	Pan-STARRS 1	·	1.7 km	MPC · JPL
894409	2017 SC_{245}	—	September 21, 2017	Haleakala	Pan-STARRS 1	KON	1.4 km	MPC · JPL
894410	2017 SN_{249}	—	September 26, 2017	Haleakala	Pan-STARRS 1	·	560 m	MPC · JPL
894411	2017 SR_{251}	—	September 22, 2017	Haleakala	Pan-STARRS 1	VER	2.1 km	MPC · JPL
894412	2017 SC_{256}	—	September 17, 2017	Haleakala	Pan-STARRS 1	·	1.4 km	MPC · JPL
894413	2017 SE_{260}	—	September 26, 2017	Haleakala	Pan-STARRS 1	·	1.4 km	MPC · JPL
894414	2017 SW_{264}	—	September 21, 2017	Haleakala	Pan-STARRS 1	·	1.1 km	MPC · JPL
894415	2017 SK_{266}	—	November 2, 2013	Mount Lemmon	Mount Lemmon Survey	·	700 m	MPC · JPL
894416	2017 SL_{271}	—	September 21, 2017	Haleakala	Pan-STARRS 1	KON	1.5 km	MPC · JPL
894417	2017 ST_{275}	—	September 17, 2017	Haleakala	Pan-STARRS 1	·	1.1 km	MPC · JPL
894418	2017 SZ_{278}	—	September 19, 2017	Haleakala	Pan-STARRS 1	·	590 m	MPC · JPL
894419	2017 ST_{282}	—	November 10, 2013	Mount Lemmon	Mount Lemmon Survey	·	450 m	MPC · JPL
894420	2017 SN_{283}	—	November 9, 2009	Mount Lemmon	Mount Lemmon Survey	(5)	580 m	MPC · JPL
894421	2017 SP_{283}	—	September 16, 2017	Haleakala	Pan-STARRS 1	·	2.0 km	MPC · JPL
894422	2017 SC_{284}	—	May 1, 2016	Cerro Tololo-DECam	DECam	·	680 m	MPC · JPL
894423	2017 SL_{294}	—	September 29, 2017	Haleakala	Pan-STARRS 1	V	380 m	MPC · JPL
894424	2017 SM_{300}	—	November 14, 2013	Mount Lemmon	Mount Lemmon Survey	·	870 m	MPC · JPL
894425	2017 SX_{306}	—	September 17, 2017	Haleakala	Pan-STARRS 1	·	1.9 km	MPC · JPL
894426	2017 SB_{318}	—	September 24, 2017	Haleakala	Pan-STARRS 1	·	2.1 km	MPC · JPL
894427	2017 SG_{407}	—	November 6, 2005	Apache Point	SDSS Collaboration	·	2.3 km	MPC · JPL
894428	2017 TD	—	October 1, 2017	Mount Lemmon	Mount Lemmon Survey	H	390 m	MPC · JPL
894429	2017 TJ_{1}	—	October 2, 2017	Mount Lemmon	Mount Lemmon Survey	APO	260 m	MPC · JPL
894430	2017 TR_{17}	—	October 15, 2017	Mount Lemmon	Mount Lemmon Survey	·	1.1 km	MPC · JPL
894431	2017 TK_{28}	—	October 15, 2017	Mount Lemmon	Mount Lemmon Survey	(5)	570 m	MPC · JPL
894432	2017 TQ_{28}	—	November 26, 2013	Mount Lemmon	Mount Lemmon Survey	(5)	760 m	MPC · JPL
894433	2017 TS_{28}	—	November 28, 2013	Mount Lemmon	Mount Lemmon Survey	·	830 m	MPC · JPL
894434	2017 TW_{30}	—	October 14, 2017	Mount Lemmon	Mount Lemmon Survey	·	840 m	MPC · JPL
894435	2017 TN_{32}	—	October 15, 2017	Mount Lemmon	Mount Lemmon Survey	·	1.1 km	MPC · JPL
894436	2017 TT_{34}	—	October 1, 2017	Mount Lemmon	Mount Lemmon Survey	H	270 m	MPC · JPL
894437	2017 TP_{36}	—	January 20, 2015	Haleakala	Pan-STARRS 1	PHO	620 m	MPC · JPL
894438	2017 TN_{39}	—	August 31, 2017	Mount Lemmon	Mount Lemmon Survey	·	860 m	MPC · JPL
894439	2017 TJ_{40}	—	October 10, 2017	Catalina	CSS	·	1.1 km	MPC · JPL
894440	2017 UY_{3}	—	May 8, 2013	Haleakala	Pan-STARRS 1	·	540 m	MPC · JPL
894441	2017 UQ_{20}	—	October 18, 2007	Mount Lemmon	Mount Lemmon Survey	H	320 m	MPC · JPL
894442	2017 UD_{24}	—	August 12, 2013	Haleakala	Pan-STARRS 1	·	830 m	MPC · JPL
894443	2017 UO_{24}	—	November 5, 2010	Mount Lemmon	Mount Lemmon Survey	·	710 m	MPC · JPL
894444	2017 UR_{32}	—	September 26, 2017	Haleakala	Pan-STARRS 1	·	870 m	MPC · JPL
894445	2017 UY_{39}	—	October 12, 2017	Mount Lemmon	Mount Lemmon Survey	·	950 m	MPC · JPL
894446	2017 UD_{42}	—	November 13, 2013	Mount Lemmon	Mount Lemmon Survey	·	630 m	MPC · JPL
894447	2017 UO_{42}	—	September 27, 2013	Haleakala	Pan-STARRS 1	·	810 m	MPC · JPL
894448	2017 UW_{42}	—	September 21, 2017	Haleakala	Pan-STARRS 1	AMO +1km	930 m	MPC · JPL
894449	2017 UT_{51}	—	December 11, 2012	Mount Lemmon	Mount Lemmon Survey	H	340 m	MPC · JPL
894450	2017 UZ_{52}	—	October 20, 2017	Mount Lemmon	Mount Lemmon Survey	·	820 m	MPC · JPL
894451	2017 UT_{53}	—	October 24, 2017	Mount Lemmon	Mount Lemmon Survey	·	3.2 km	MPC · JPL
894452	2017 UN_{55}	—	October 20, 2017	Mount Lemmon	Mount Lemmon Survey	·	920 m	MPC · JPL
894453	2017 UR_{56}	—	October 27, 2017	Haleakala	Pan-STARRS 1	ADE	1.1 km	MPC · JPL
894454	2017 UO_{57}	—	October 21, 2017	Mount Lemmon	Mount Lemmon Survey	·	810 m	MPC · JPL
894455	2017 UP_{58}	—	October 22, 2017	Mount Lemmon	Mount Lemmon Survey	·	740 m	MPC · JPL
894456	2017 UX_{60}	—	April 18, 2015	Cerro Tololo-DECam	DECam	·	760 m	MPC · JPL
894457	2017 UF_{62}	—	October 28, 2017	Haleakala	Pan-STARRS 1	H	400 m	MPC · JPL
894458	2017 UC_{64}	—	October 29, 2017	Haleakala	Pan-STARRS 1	H	470 m	MPC · JPL
894459	2017 UG_{67}	—	October 29, 2017	Haleakala	Pan-STARRS 1	·	1.1 km	MPC · JPL
894460	2017 UZ_{67}	—	October 18, 2017	Haleakala	Pan-STARRS 1	V	410 m	MPC · JPL
894461	2017 UD_{70}	—	October 23, 2017	Mount Lemmon	Mount Lemmon Survey	H	290 m	MPC · JPL
894462	2017 UQ_{71}	—	October 17, 2017	Mount Lemmon	Mount Lemmon Survey	H	320 m	MPC · JPL
894463	2017 UE_{72}	—	October 17, 2017	Mount Lemmon	Mount Lemmon Survey	·	1.8 km	MPC · JPL
894464	2017 UR_{74}	—	October 28, 2017	Mount Lemmon	Mount Lemmon Survey	·	650 m	MPC · JPL
894465	2017 UR_{80}	—	October 28, 2017	Mount Lemmon	Mount Lemmon Survey	·	990 m	MPC · JPL
894466	2017 UA_{82}	—	October 30, 2017	Haleakala	Pan-STARRS 1	·	1.3 km	MPC · JPL
894467	2017 UU_{82}	—	November 2, 2008	Kitt Peak	Spacewatch	·	960 m	MPC · JPL
894468	2017 UA_{87}	—	October 27, 2017	Haleakala	Pan-STARRS 1	H	440 m	MPC · JPL
894469	2017 UH_{87}	—	October 28, 2017	Haleakala	Pan-STARRS 1	PHO	570 m	MPC · JPL
894470	2017 US_{90}	—	September 24, 2017	Haleakala	Pan-STARRS 1	·	960 m	MPC · JPL
894471	2017 UC_{97}	—	October 22, 2017	Mount Lemmon	Mount Lemmon Survey	·	880 m	MPC · JPL
894472	2017 UJ_{110}	—	October 23, 2017	Mount Lemmon	Mount Lemmon Survey	·	1.4 km	MPC · JPL
894473	2017 UO_{111}	—	September 6, 2008	Mount Lemmon	Mount Lemmon Survey	·	890 m	MPC · JPL
894474	2017 UL_{115}	—	October 28, 2017	Haleakala	Pan-STARRS 1	·	680 m	MPC · JPL
894475	2017 UB_{116}	—	April 18, 2015	Cerro Tololo-DECam	DECam	HOF	1.7 km	MPC · JPL
894476	2017 UB_{119}	—	April 21, 2015	Cerro Tololo-DECam	DECam	·	1.2 km	MPC · JPL
894477	2017 UW_{120}	—	October 28, 2017	Haleakala	Pan-STARRS 1	·	1.2 km	MPC · JPL
894478	2017 UZ_{124}	—	April 19, 2015	Cerro Tololo-DECam	DECam	MIS	1.5 km	MPC · JPL
894479	2017 UK_{129}	—	October 23, 2017	Mount Lemmon	Mount Lemmon Survey	(5)	480 m	MPC · JPL
894480	2017 UL_{130}	—	October 29, 2017	Haleakala	Pan-STARRS 1	·	1.3 km	MPC · JPL
894481	2017 US_{130}	—	October 2, 2017	Mount Lemmon	Mount Lemmon Survey	H	310 m	MPC · JPL
894482	2017 UD_{136}	—	October 24, 2017	Mount Lemmon	Mount Lemmon Survey	H	320 m	MPC · JPL
894483	2017 UF_{142}	—	October 28, 2017	Haleakala	Pan-STARRS 1	·	610 m	MPC · JPL
894484	2017 UE_{143}	—	March 23, 2015	Kitt Peak	L. H. Wasserman, M. W. Buie	MAS	380 m	MPC · JPL
894485	2017 UA_{155}	—	October 28, 2017	Haleakala	Pan-STARRS 1	·	1.2 km	MPC · JPL
894486	2017 US_{157}	—	October 21, 2017	Mount Lemmon	Mount Lemmon Survey	·	670 m	MPC · JPL
894487	2017 UK_{158}	—	October 22, 2017	Mount Lemmon	Mount Lemmon Survey	·	930 m	MPC · JPL
894488	2017 UV_{161}	—	April 18, 2015	Cerro Tololo-DECam	DECam	·	1.1 km	MPC · JPL
894489	2017 UX_{162}	—	September 26, 2017	Haleakala	Pan-STARRS 1	·	1.8 km	MPC · JPL
894490	2017 UE_{181}	—	January 20, 2015	Haleakala	Pan-STARRS 1	·	680 m	MPC · JPL
894491	2017 UA_{202}	—	October 29, 2017	Haleakala	Pan-STARRS 1	H	370 m	MPC · JPL
894492	2017 UO_{205}	—	October 26, 2017	Mount Lemmon	Mount Lemmon Survey	H	310 m	MPC · JPL
894493	2017 UP_{213}	—	October 28, 2017	Haleakala	Pan-STARRS 1	·	640 m	MPC · JPL
894494	2017 UE_{231}	—	October 28, 2017	Haleakala	Pan-STARRS 1	·	590 m	MPC · JPL
894495	2017 VT_{1}	—	March 4, 2016	Haleakala	Pan-STARRS 1	H	400 m	MPC · JPL
894496	2017 VK_{3}	—	September 24, 2017	Haleakala	Pan-STARRS 1	H	370 m	MPC · JPL
894497	2017 VR_{5}	—	October 11, 2017	Mount Lemmon	Mount Lemmon Survey	·	820 m	MPC · JPL
894498	2017 VS_{7}	—	February 8, 2011	Mount Lemmon	Mount Lemmon Survey	NYS	800 m	MPC · JPL
894499	2017 VZ_{16}	—	October 30, 2013	Haleakala	Pan-STARRS 1	·	620 m	MPC · JPL
894500	2017 VD_{18}	—	November 28, 2013	Mount Lemmon	Mount Lemmon Survey	·	920 m	MPC · JPL

== 894501–894600 ==
back to top

Designation			Discovery			Properties		Ref
Permanent	Provisional	Named after	Date	Site	Discoverer(s)	Category	Diam.	Ref
894501	2017 VV_{20}	—	September 3, 2013	Mount Lemmon	Mount Lemmon Survey	·	810 m	MPC · JPL
894502	2017 VK_{29}	—	January 15, 2015	Haleakala	Pan-STARRS 1	·	700 m	MPC · JPL
894503	2017 VT_{30}	—	January 30, 2011	Mount Lemmon	Mount Lemmon Survey	MAS	450 m	MPC · JPL
894504	2017 VC_{33}	—	October 14, 2013	Mount Lemmon	Mount Lemmon Survey	NYS	870 m	MPC · JPL
894505	2017 VL_{36}	—	November 13, 2017	Haleakala	Pan-STARRS 1	H	290 m	MPC · JPL
894506	2017 VQ_{37}	—	November 13, 2017	Haleakala	Pan-STARRS 1	EUN	680 m	MPC · JPL
894507	2017 VQ_{38}	—	November 10, 2009	Catalina	CSS	·	790 m	MPC · JPL
894508	2017 VA_{39}	—	November 13, 2017	Haleakala	Pan-STARRS 1	·	830 m	MPC · JPL
894509	2017 VN_{40}	—	April 18, 2015	Cerro Tololo-DECam	DECam	·	930 m	MPC · JPL
894510	2017 VC_{44}	—	November 14, 2017	Mount Lemmon	Mount Lemmon Survey	·	1.1 km	MPC · JPL
894511	2017 VW_{46}	—	November 9, 2017	Haleakala	Pan-STARRS 1	·	940 m	MPC · JPL
894512	2017 VS_{51}	—	November 13, 2017	Haleakala	Pan-STARRS 1	H	290 m	MPC · JPL
894513	2017 VA_{61}	—	November 13, 2017	Haleakala	Pan-STARRS 1	PHO	600 m	MPC · JPL
894514	2017 VO_{69}	—	November 10, 2017	Haleakala	Pan-STARRS 1	H	340 m	MPC · JPL
894515	2017 WH_{9}	—	December 27, 2006	Mount Lemmon	Mount Lemmon Survey	·	840 m	MPC · JPL
894516	2017 WX_{15}	—	November 24, 2017	Haleakala	Pan-STARRS 1	H	370 m	MPC · JPL
894517	2017 WM_{22}	—	September 14, 2013	Haleakala	Pan-STARRS 1	·	800 m	MPC · JPL
894518	2017 WZ_{30}	—	November 20, 2017	Haleakala	Pan-STARRS 1	·	1.0 km	MPC · JPL
894519	2017 WB_{31}	—	November 22, 2017	Haleakala	Pan-STARRS 1	H	380 m	MPC · JPL
894520	2017 WN_{31}	—	November 21, 2017	Mount Lemmon	Mount Lemmon Survey	H	350 m	MPC · JPL
894521	2017 WW_{31}	—	November 21, 2017	Haleakala	Pan-STARRS 1	·	790 m	MPC · JPL
894522	2017 WH_{33}	—	November 22, 2017	Haleakala	Pan-STARRS 1	JUN	680 m	MPC · JPL
894523	2017 WS_{33}	—	November 16, 2017	Mount Lemmon	Mount Lemmon Survey	·	1.4 km	MPC · JPL
894524	2017 WA_{35}	—	November 21, 2017	Haleakala	Pan-STARRS 1	H	360 m	MPC · JPL
894525	2017 WC_{35}	—	November 22, 2017	Haleakala	Pan-STARRS 1	·	960 m	MPC · JPL
894526	2017 WV_{36}	—	November 21, 2017	Haleakala	Pan-STARRS 1	·	930 m	MPC · JPL
894527	2017 WY_{38}	—	March 30, 2011	Mount Lemmon	Mount Lemmon Survey	·	830 m	MPC · JPL
894528	2017 WD_{42}	—	November 21, 2017	Haleakala	Pan-STARRS 1	PHO	610 m	MPC · JPL
894529	2017 WC_{47}	—	November 20, 2017	Haleakala	Pan-STARRS 1	H	440 m	MPC · JPL
894530	2017 WF_{52}	—	November 24, 2017	Haleakala	Pan-STARRS 1	PHO	750 m	MPC · JPL
894531	2017 WX_{52}	—	November 16, 2017	Mount Lemmon	Mount Lemmon Survey	·	740 m	MPC · JPL
894532	2017 WZ_{54}	—	November 21, 2017	Haleakala	Pan-STARRS 1	·	1.6 km	MPC · JPL
894533	2017 WA_{60}	—	November 22, 2017	Haleakala	Pan-STARRS 1	H	370 m	MPC · JPL
894534	2017 WF_{62}	—	November 22, 2017	Mount Lemmon	Mount Lemmon Survey	H	300 m	MPC · JPL
894535	2017 WW_{64}	—	October 15, 2017	Mount Lemmon	Mount Lemmon Survey	·	1.2 km	MPC · JPL
894536	2017 WL_{65}	—	November 17, 2017	Mount Lemmon	Mount Lemmon Survey	·	730 m	MPC · JPL
894537	2017 WR_{67}	—	November 20, 2017	Haleakala	Pan-STARRS 1	·	1.3 km	MPC · JPL
894538	2017 WY_{69}	—	November 18, 2017	Haleakala	Pan-STARRS 1	·	1.4 km	MPC · JPL
894539	2017 WP_{74}	—	November 16, 2017	Mount Lemmon	Mount Lemmon Survey	·	980 m	MPC · JPL
894540	2017 WO_{85}	—	January 21, 2014	Kitt Peak	Spacewatch	·	1.1 km	MPC · JPL
894541	2017 XU_{4}	—	December 24, 2013	Mount Lemmon	Mount Lemmon Survey	·	1.2 km	MPC · JPL
894542	2017 XZ_{8}	—	October 21, 2017	Mount Lemmon	Mount Lemmon Survey	(5)	740 m	MPC · JPL
894543	2017 XF_{9}	—	November 11, 2017	Kitt Peak	Spacewatch	·	900 m	MPC · JPL
894544	2017 XM_{9}	—	February 25, 2011	Mount Lemmon	Mount Lemmon Survey	·	740 m	MPC · JPL
894545	2017 XQ_{10}	—	September 22, 2009	Mount Lemmon	Mount Lemmon Survey	·	700 m	MPC · JPL
894546	2017 XY_{11}	—	December 21, 2006	Kitt Peak	Spacewatch	MAS	500 m	MPC · JPL
894547	2017 XC_{12}	—	December 3, 2010	Mount Lemmon	Mount Lemmon Survey	·	650 m	MPC · JPL
894548	2017 XZ_{14}	—	September 3, 2008	Kitt Peak	Spacewatch	·	900 m	MPC · JPL
894549	2017 XL_{18}	—	February 10, 2011	Mount Lemmon	Mount Lemmon Survey	·	860 m	MPC · JPL
894550	2017 XQ_{18}	—	September 23, 2001	Kitt Peak	Spacewatch	·	910 m	MPC · JPL
894551	2017 XA_{25}	—	April 18, 2015	Cerro Tololo-DECam	DECam	·	1.1 km	MPC · JPL
894552	2017 XD_{26}	—	May 1, 2016	Cerro Tololo-DECam	DECam	·	740 m	MPC · JPL
894553	2017 XM_{27}	—	April 19, 2015	Cerro Tololo-DECam	DECam	WIT	640 m	MPC · JPL
894554	2017 XW_{31}	—	September 25, 2011	Haleakala	Pan-STARRS 1	LIX	2.3 km	MPC · JPL
894555	2017 XA_{37}	—	November 21, 2017	Mount Lemmon	Mount Lemmon Survey	H	380 m	MPC · JPL
894556	2017 XP_{37}	—	November 28, 2013	Mount Lemmon	Mount Lemmon Survey	·	1.0 km	MPC · JPL
894557	2017 XW_{55}	—	March 28, 2015	Catalina	CSS	PHO	760 m	MPC · JPL
894558	2017 XZ_{59}	—	December 12, 2017	Haleakala	Pan-STARRS 1	H	330 m	MPC · JPL
894559	2017 XW_{62}	—	September 22, 2017	Haleakala	Pan-STARRS 1	·	1.2 km	MPC · JPL
894560	2017 XY_{64}	—	December 13, 2017	Haleakala	Pan-STARRS 1	(194)	960 m	MPC · JPL
894561	2017 XK_{65}	—	December 12, 2017	Haleakala	Pan-STARRS 1	T_{j} (2.99) · 3:2	2.8 km	MPC · JPL
894562	2017 XV_{65}	—	December 15, 2017	Mount Lemmon	Mount Lemmon Survey	H	440 m	MPC · JPL
894563	2017 XV_{66}	—	December 13, 2017	Mount Lemmon	Mount Lemmon Survey	·	630 m	MPC · JPL
894564	2017 XG_{69}	—	December 13, 2017	Mount Lemmon	Mount Lemmon Survey	(10369)	1.2 km	MPC · JPL
894565	2017 XU_{70}	—	December 8, 2017	Haleakala	Pan-STARRS 1	H	340 m	MPC · JPL
894566	2017 XC_{73}	—	December 12, 2017	Haleakala	Pan-STARRS 1	PHO	680 m	MPC · JPL
894567	2017 XA_{78}	—	December 11, 2017	Haleakala	Pan-STARRS 1	H	340 m	MPC · JPL
894568	2017 XZ_{85}	—	December 8, 2017	Haleakala	Pan-STARRS 1	·	880 m	MPC · JPL
894569	2017 XR_{86}	—	December 13, 2017	Mount Lemmon	Mount Lemmon Survey	·	930 m	MPC · JPL
894570	2017 XA_{88}	—	December 12, 2017	Haleakala	Pan-STARRS 1	PHO	540 m	MPC · JPL
894571	2017 XR_{88}	—	December 13, 2017	Haleakala	Pan-STARRS 1	·	710 m	MPC · JPL
894572	2017 XS_{89}	—	December 12, 2017	Haleakala	Pan-STARRS 1	·	600 m	MPC · JPL
894573	2017 YE_{4}	—	December 24, 2017	Mount Lemmon	Mount Lemmon Survey	H	430 m	MPC · JPL
894574	2017 YP_{7}	—	March 6, 2016	Haleakala	Pan-STARRS 1	H	390 m	MPC · JPL
894575	2017 YS_{8}	—	December 30, 2017	Mount Lemmon	Mount Lemmon Survey	ATE · PHA	410 m	MPC · JPL
894576	2017 YF_{9}	—	March 14, 2007	Kitt Peak	Spacewatch	NYS	670 m	MPC · JPL
894577	2017 YK_{11}	—	December 7, 2013	Kitt Peak	Spacewatch	·	610 m	MPC · JPL
894578	2017 YM_{17}	—	December 28, 2017	Mount Lemmon	Mount Lemmon Survey	H	420 m	MPC · JPL
894579	2017 YR_{20}	—	December 24, 2017	Haleakala	Pan-STARRS 1	BRA	1.0 km	MPC · JPL
894580	2017 YB_{21}	—	December 29, 2017	Haleakala	Pan-STARRS 1	·	1.9 km	MPC · JPL
894581	2017 YA_{22}	—	December 25, 2017	Haleakala	Pan-STARRS 1	H	420 m	MPC · JPL
894582	2017 YR_{23}	—	December 20, 2017	Mount Lemmon	Mount Lemmon Survey	BAR	930 m	MPC · JPL
894583	2017 YK_{24}	—	December 29, 2017	Haleakala	Pan-STARRS 1	·	930 m	MPC · JPL
894584	2017 YV_{24}	—	December 22, 2017	Haleakala	Pan-STARRS 1	·	770 m	MPC · JPL
894585	2017 YU_{25}	—	December 23, 2017	Haleakala	Pan-STARRS 1	·	1.4 km	MPC · JPL
894586	2017 YT_{26}	—	December 26, 2017	Mount Lemmon	Mount Lemmon Survey	·	890 m	MPC · JPL
894587	2017 YX_{26}	—	December 23, 2017	Haleakala	Pan-STARRS 1	·	1.9 km	MPC · JPL
894588	2017 YU_{27}	—	December 23, 2017	Haleakala	Pan-STARRS 1	·	780 m	MPC · JPL
894589	2017 YV_{28}	—	December 29, 2017	Haleakala	Pan-STARRS 1	·	870 m	MPC · JPL
894590	2017 YY_{28}	—	December 23, 2017	Haleakala	Pan-STARRS 1	·	1.7 km	MPC · JPL
894591	2017 YA_{31}	—	December 25, 2017	Haleakala	Pan-STARRS 1	·	1.1 km	MPC · JPL
894592	2017 YA_{35}	—	December 29, 2017	Haleakala	Pan-STARRS 1	·	860 m	MPC · JPL
894593	2017 YB_{36}	—	December 23, 2017	Haleakala	Pan-STARRS 1	MAR	770 m	MPC · JPL
894594	2017 YD_{36}	—	December 24, 2017	Haleakala	Pan-STARRS 1	·	1.3 km	MPC · JPL
894595	2017 YT_{37}	—	December 19, 2017	Mount Lemmon	Mount Lemmon Survey	H	380 m	MPC · JPL
894596	2017 YE_{38}	—	December 21, 2017	Mount Lemmon	Mount Lemmon Survey	H	460 m	MPC · JPL
894597	2017 YW_{40}	—	December 22, 2017	Haleakala	Pan-STARRS 1	·	1.7 km	MPC · JPL
894598	2017 YQ_{45}	—	December 23, 2017	Haleakala	Pan-STARRS 1	·	1.4 km	MPC · JPL
894599	2017 YC_{46}	—	December 19, 2017	Mount Lemmon	Mount Lemmon Survey	·	1.3 km	MPC · JPL
894600	2017 YJ_{51}	—	December 26, 2017	Haleakala	Pan-STARRS 1	·	2.4 km	MPC · JPL

== 894601–894700 ==
back to top

Designation			Discovery			Properties		Ref
Permanent	Provisional	Named after	Date	Site	Discoverer(s)	Category	Diam.	Ref
894601	2017 YB_{53}	—	December 22, 2017	Haleakala	Pan-STARRS 1	H	330 m	MPC · JPL
894602	2017 YV_{53}	—	December 23, 2017	Haleakala	Pan-STARRS 1	KOR	930 m	MPC · JPL
894603	2017 YM_{55}	—	December 20, 2017	Mount Lemmon	Mount Lemmon Survey	·	1.1 km	MPC · JPL
894604	2017 YX_{55}	—	February 28, 2014	Haleakala	Pan-STARRS 1	·	850 m	MPC · JPL
894605	2017 YK_{56}	—	December 25, 2017	Haleakala	Pan-STARRS 1	EOS	1.3 km	MPC · JPL
894606	2017 YM_{56}	—	January 6, 2005	Catalina	CSS	BAR	840 m	MPC · JPL
894607	2017 YV_{56}	—	December 28, 2017	Mount Lemmon	Mount Lemmon Survey	·	1.0 km	MPC · JPL
894608	2017 YG_{57}	—	May 20, 2015	Cerro Tololo-DECam	DECam	·	810 m	MPC · JPL
894609	2017 YH_{57}	—	December 23, 2017	Haleakala	Pan-STARRS 1	MAS	590 m	MPC · JPL
894610	2017 YA_{58}	—	December 23, 2017	Haleakala	Pan-STARRS 1	·	760 m	MPC · JPL
894611	2017 YB_{59}	—	December 24, 2017	Haleakala	Pan-STARRS 1	·	830 m	MPC · JPL
894612	2017 YG_{59}	—	August 3, 2016	Haleakala	Pan-STARRS 1	·	1.3 km	MPC · JPL
894613	2017 YY_{73}	—	December 26, 2017	Haleakala	Pan-STARRS 1	3:2	3.3 km	MPC · JPL
894614	2018 AX_{2}	—	December 12, 2017	Mount Lemmon	Mount Lemmon Survey	H	380 m	MPC · JPL
894615	2018 AX_{4}	—	August 3, 2016	Haleakala	Pan-STARRS 1	PHO	650 m	MPC · JPL
894616	2018 AL_{20}	—	December 30, 2017	Mount Lemmon	Mount Lemmon Survey	H	420 m	MPC · JPL
894617	2018 AV_{23}	—	December 25, 2017	Mount Lemmon	Mount Lemmon Survey	H	400 m	MPC · JPL
894618	2018 AL_{24}	—	January 13, 2018	Mount Lemmon	Mount Lemmon Survey	·	1.0 km	MPC · JPL
894619	2018 AV_{24}	—	January 9, 2018	Haleakala	Pan-STARRS 1	·	780 m	MPC · JPL
894620	2018 AW_{24}	—	January 13, 2018	Mount Lemmon	Mount Lemmon Survey	HNS	730 m	MPC · JPL
894621	2018 AE_{25}	—	January 11, 2018	Haleakala	Pan-STARRS 1	H	350 m	MPC · JPL
894622	2018 AH_{26}	—	January 15, 2018	Mount Lemmon	Mount Lemmon Survey	H	440 m	MPC · JPL
894623	2018 AK_{29}	—	January 24, 2014	Haleakala	Pan-STARRS 1	·	590 m	MPC · JPL
894624	2018 AR_{29}	—	January 13, 2018	Haleakala	Pan-STARRS 1	·	2.4 km	MPC · JPL
894625	2018 AX_{32}	—	January 12, 2018	Haleakala	Pan-STARRS 1	·	2.1 km	MPC · JPL
894626	2018 AC_{35}	—	January 13, 2018	Mount Lemmon	Mount Lemmon Survey	·	850 m	MPC · JPL
894627	2018 AX_{35}	—	January 15, 2018	Mount Lemmon	Mount Lemmon Survey	·	1 km	MPC · JPL
894628	2018 AF_{39}	—	January 12, 2018	Haleakala	Pan-STARRS 1	·	790 m	MPC · JPL
894629	2018 AY_{39}	—	January 13, 2018	Mount Lemmon	Mount Lemmon Survey	·	800 m	MPC · JPL
894630	2018 AL_{40}	—	January 5, 2018	Mount Lemmon	Mount Lemmon Survey	H	360 m	MPC · JPL
894631	2018 AR_{40}	—	April 15, 2013	Catalina	CSS	H	400 m	MPC · JPL
894632	2018 AU_{42}	—	October 8, 2012	Haleakala	Pan-STARRS 1	·	860 m	MPC · JPL
894633	2018 AZ_{42}	—	January 14, 2018	Haleakala	Pan-STARRS 1	·	1 km	MPC · JPL
894634	2018 AF_{43}	—	January 14, 2018	Mount Lemmon	Mount Lemmon Survey	·	1.0 km	MPC · JPL
894635	2018 AN_{43}	—	January 12, 2018	Haleakala	Pan-STARRS 1	·	890 m	MPC · JPL
894636	2018 AB_{45}	—	January 14, 2018	Haleakala	Pan-STARRS 1	·	870 m	MPC · JPL
894637	2018 AZ_{45}	—	January 15, 2018	Haleakala	Pan-STARRS 1	·	610 m	MPC · JPL
894638	2018 AW_{46}	—	January 13, 2018	Mount Lemmon	Mount Lemmon Survey	KOR	960 m	MPC · JPL
894639	2018 AF_{48}	—	January 15, 2018	Haleakala	Pan-STARRS 1	·	620 m	MPC · JPL
894640	2018 AV_{52}	—	January 15, 2018	Haleakala	Pan-STARRS 1	·	710 m	MPC · JPL
894641	2018 AF_{53}	—	January 14, 2018	Haleakala	Pan-STARRS 1	·	1.0 km	MPC · JPL
894642	2018 AT_{54}	—	January 12, 2018	Mount Lemmon	Mount Lemmon Survey	H	410 m	MPC · JPL
894643	2018 AV_{55}	—	January 15, 2018	Haleakala	Pan-STARRS 1	(5)	820 m	MPC · JPL
894644	2018 AY_{56}	—	January 12, 2018	Mount Lemmon	Mount Lemmon Survey	HNS	840 m	MPC · JPL
894645	2018 AG_{58}	—	January 15, 2018	Haleakala	Pan-STARRS 1	·	660 m	MPC · JPL
894646	2018 AP_{58}	—	January 11, 2018	Haleakala	Pan-STARRS 1	·	780 m	MPC · JPL
894647	2018 AY_{58}	—	January 15, 2018	Haleakala	Pan-STARRS 1	·	720 m	MPC · JPL
894648	2018 AO_{59}	—	January 10, 2018	Haleakala	Pan-STARRS 1	EUN	850 m	MPC · JPL
894649	2018 AU_{59}	—	January 15, 2018	Haleakala	Pan-STARRS 1	·	630 m	MPC · JPL
894650	2018 AE_{61}	—	January 12, 2018	Mount Lemmon	Mount Lemmon Survey	MAR	540 m	MPC · JPL
894651	2018 AF_{61}	—	April 28, 2014	Cerro Tololo-DECam	DECam	·	1.3 km	MPC · JPL
894652	2018 AO_{61}	—	January 13, 2018	Mount Lemmon	Mount Lemmon Survey	·	840 m	MPC · JPL
894653	2018 AD_{62}	—	January 21, 2014	Kitt Peak	Spacewatch	·	900 m	MPC · JPL
894654	2018 AZ_{62}	—	October 6, 2016	Haleakala	Pan-STARRS 1	·	1.5 km	MPC · JPL
894655	2018 AH_{64}	—	January 15, 2018	Mount Lemmon	Mount Lemmon Survey	·	1.3 km	MPC · JPL
894656	2018 AZ_{64}	—	January 15, 2018	Haleakala	Pan-STARRS 1	PHO	660 m	MPC · JPL
894657	2018 BE_{1}	—	November 13, 2017	Haleakala	Pan-STARRS 1	H	370 m	MPC · JPL
894658	2018 BL_{3}	—	January 18, 2018	Mount Lemmon	Mount Lemmon Survey	AMO	340 m	MPC · JPL
894659	2018 BX_{3}	—	February 24, 2014	Haleakala	Pan-STARRS 1	·	510 m	MPC · JPL
894660	2018 BE_{4}	—	December 12, 2017	Haleakala	Pan-STARRS 1	H	340 m	MPC · JPL
894661	2018 BA_{6}	—	January 16, 2018	Haleakala	Pan-STARRS 1	H	320 m	MPC · JPL
894662	2018 BA_{9}	—	January 1, 2014	Mount Lemmon	Mount Lemmon Survey	·	800 m	MPC · JPL
894663	2018 BN_{9}	—	May 22, 2015	Cerro Tololo-DECam	DECam	·	680 m	MPC · JPL
894664	2018 BY_{9}	—	January 1, 2014	Kitt Peak	Spacewatch	·	600 m	MPC · JPL
894665	2018 BJ_{10}	—	June 12, 2016	Mount Lemmon	Mount Lemmon Survey	H	360 m	MPC · JPL
894666	2018 BQ_{11}	—	May 1, 2016	Cerro Tololo-DECam	DECam	·	1.2 km	MPC · JPL
894667	2018 BV_{12}	—	January 28, 2014	Mount Lemmon	Mount Lemmon Survey	EUN	710 m	MPC · JPL
894668	2018 BG_{14}	—	January 16, 2018	Haleakala	Pan-STARRS 1	·	940 m	MPC · JPL
894669	2018 BO_{14}	—	May 20, 2015	Cerro Tololo-DECam	DECam	·	650 m	MPC · JPL
894670	2018 BA_{15}	—	January 20, 2018	Mount Lemmon	Mount Lemmon Survey	·	2.6 km	MPC · JPL
894671	2018 BP_{15}	—	January 17, 2018	Haleakala	Pan-STARRS 1	·	1.8 km	MPC · JPL
894672	2018 BK_{16}	—	January 16, 2018	Haleakala	Pan-STARRS 1	·	820 m	MPC · JPL
894673	2018 BS_{16}	—	January 23, 2018	Mount Lemmon	Mount Lemmon Survey	·	1.1 km	MPC · JPL
894674	2018 BW_{16}	—	January 16, 2018	Haleakala	Pan-STARRS 1	VER	1.8 km	MPC · JPL
894675	2018 BA_{17}	—	January 20, 2018	Haleakala	Pan-STARRS 1	·	1.4 km	MPC · JPL
894676	2018 BK_{17}	—	January 20, 2018	Haleakala	Pan-STARRS 1	·	1.0 km	MPC · JPL
894677	2018 BU_{17}	—	January 23, 2018	Mount Lemmon	Mount Lemmon Survey	·	1.7 km	MPC · JPL
894678	2018 BG_{18}	—	January 16, 2018	Haleakala	Pan-STARRS 1	NYS	780 m	MPC · JPL
894679	2018 BY_{18}	—	February 26, 2014	Haleakala	Pan-STARRS 1	·	680 m	MPC · JPL
894680	2018 BG_{19}	—	January 20, 2018	Haleakala	Pan-STARRS 1	EOS	1.5 km	MPC · JPL
894681	2018 BJ_{21}	—	January 23, 2018	Mount Lemmon	Mount Lemmon Survey	MAR	600 m	MPC · JPL
894682	2018 BL_{21}	—	January 20, 2018	Haleakala	Pan-STARRS 1	·	1.1 km	MPC · JPL
894683	2018 BO_{21}	—	January 16, 2018	Haleakala	Pan-STARRS 1	·	760 m	MPC · JPL
894684	2018 BU_{21}	—	January 20, 2018	Haleakala	Pan-STARRS 1	·	970 m	MPC · JPL
894685	2018 BA_{22}	—	January 16, 2018	Haleakala	Pan-STARRS 1	H	310 m	MPC · JPL
894686	2018 BM_{22}	—	January 20, 2018	Haleakala	Pan-STARRS 1	·	670 m	MPC · JPL
894687	2018 BS_{22}	—	January 20, 2018	Haleakala	Pan-STARRS 1	·	940 m	MPC · JPL
894688	2018 BC_{25}	—	August 7, 2016	Haleakala	Pan-STARRS 1	·	720 m	MPC · JPL
894689	2018 BG_{28}	—	January 20, 2018	Haleakala	Pan-STARRS 1	·	800 m	MPC · JPL
894690	2018 BX_{31}	—	October 12, 2007	Kitt Peak	Spacewatch	·	1.1 km	MPC · JPL
894691	2018 BB_{35}	—	May 20, 2015	Cerro Tololo-DECam	DECam	·	730 m	MPC · JPL
894692	2018 BF_{35}	—	January 20, 2018	Mount Lemmon	Mount Lemmon Survey	·	870 m	MPC · JPL
894693	2018 BX_{35}	—	February 21, 2014	Mount Lemmon	Mount Lemmon Survey	MAR	660 m	MPC · JPL
894694	2018 BB_{37}	—	January 20, 2018	Haleakala	Pan-STARRS 1	·	880 m	MPC · JPL
894695	2018 BQ_{37}	—	January 20, 2018	Mount Lemmon	Mount Lemmon Survey	MAR	770 m	MPC · JPL
894696	2018 BE_{38}	—	January 13, 2018	Mount Lemmon	Mount Lemmon Survey	·	960 m	MPC · JPL
894697	2018 BT_{38}	—	May 22, 2015	Cerro Tololo-DECam	DECam	·	750 m	MPC · JPL
894698	2018 BE_{39}	—	January 20, 2018	Haleakala	Pan-STARRS 1	·	760 m	MPC · JPL
894699	2018 BN_{39}	—	June 7, 2011	Haleakala	Pan-STARRS 1	·	800 m	MPC · JPL
894700	2018 BC_{40}	—	January 17, 2018	Mount Lemmon	Mount Lemmon Survey	PHO	670 m	MPC · JPL

== 894701–894800 ==
back to top

Designation			Discovery			Properties		Ref
Permanent	Provisional	Named after	Date	Site	Discoverer(s)	Category	Diam.	Ref
894701	2018 BM_{42}	—	January 18, 2018	Mount Lemmon	Mount Lemmon Survey	EUN	750 m	MPC · JPL
894702	2018 BO_{51}	—	December 29, 2011	Mount Lemmon	Mount Lemmon Survey	LUT	2.5 km	MPC · JPL
894703	2018 BN_{108}	—	August 10, 2012	Kitt Peak	Spacewatch	·	850 m	MPC · JPL
894704	2018 BC_{129}	—	March 8, 2008	Kitt Peak	Spacewatch	·	1.4 km	MPC · JPL
894705	2018 CL_{3}	—	September 23, 2011	Kitt Peak	Spacewatch	H	320 m	MPC · JPL
894706	2018 CW_{12}	—	October 1, 2008	Catalina	CSS	(1547)	1.1 km	MPC · JPL
894707	2018 CA_{18}	—	February 12, 2018	Haleakala	Pan-STARRS 1	H	320 m	MPC · JPL
894708	2018 CU_{19}	—	February 12, 2018	Haleakala	Pan-STARRS 1	·	770 m	MPC · JPL
894709	2018 CP_{20}	—	February 12, 2018	Haleakala	Pan-STARRS 1	H	290 m	MPC · JPL
894710	2018 CE_{23}	—	February 12, 2018	Haleakala	Pan-STARRS 1	(5)	840 m	MPC · JPL
894711	2018 CN_{27}	—	February 12, 2018	Haleakala	Pan-STARRS 1	·	1.3 km	MPC · JPL
894712	2018 CY_{27}	—	April 24, 2014	Cerro Tololo-DECam	DECam	·	990 m	MPC · JPL
894713	2018 CX_{28}	—	April 23, 2014	Cerro Tololo-DECam	DECam	·	1.1 km	MPC · JPL
894714	2018 CF_{29}	—	November 20, 2014	Haleakala	Pan-STARRS 1	H	390 m	MPC · JPL
894715	2018 CT_{29}	—	February 12, 2018	Haleakala	Pan-STARRS 1	·	2.4 km	MPC · JPL
894716	2018 CW_{29}	—	February 12, 2018	Haleakala	Pan-STARRS 1	MAR	730 m	MPC · JPL
894717	2018 CD_{30}	—	February 11, 2018	Mount Lemmon	Mount Lemmon Survey	·	910 m	MPC · JPL
894718	2018 CT_{30}	—	February 10, 2018	Mount Lemmon	Mount Lemmon Survey	HNS	800 m	MPC · JPL
894719	2018 CP_{31}	—	February 10, 2018	Haleakala	Pan-STARRS 1	·	820 m	MPC · JPL
894720	2018 CA_{34}	—	February 10, 2018	Mount Lemmon	Mount Lemmon Survey	·	1.1 km	MPC · JPL
894721	2018 CE_{42}	—	February 12, 2018	Haleakala	Pan-STARRS 1	·	2.1 km	MPC · JPL
894722	2018 DV_{4}	—	February 25, 2018	Mount Lemmon	Mount Lemmon Survey	H	350 m	MPC · JPL
894723	2018 DE_{5}	—	February 21, 2018	Haleakala	Pan-STARRS 1	H	330 m	MPC · JPL
894724	2018 DL_{5}	—	February 25, 2018	Mount Lemmon	Mount Lemmon Survey	H	400 m	MPC · JPL
894725	2018 DK_{6}	—	February 21, 2018	Haleakala	Pan-STARRS 1	·	1.8 km	MPC · JPL
894726	2018 DQ_{7}	—	February 21, 2018	Haleakala	Pan-STARRS 1	H	320 m	MPC · JPL
894727	2018 DN_{8}	—	February 23, 2018	Mount Lemmon	Mount Lemmon Survey	·	870 m	MPC · JPL
894728	2018 DV_{9}	—	February 25, 2018	Mount Lemmon	Mount Lemmon Survey	EUN	670 m	MPC · JPL
894729	2018 DK_{10}	—	February 17, 2018	Mount Lemmon	Mount Lemmon Survey	·	1.8 km	MPC · JPL
894730	2018 DV_{10}	—	February 17, 2018	Mount Lemmon	Mount Lemmon Survey	·	630 m	MPC · JPL
894731	2018 DA_{11}	—	January 31, 2009	Mount Lemmon	Mount Lemmon Survey	JUN	640 m	MPC · JPL
894732	2018 DD_{12}	—	February 12, 2018	Haleakala	Pan-STARRS 1	KON	1.6 km	MPC · JPL
894733	2018 DS_{12}	—	February 25, 2018	Mount Lemmon	Mount Lemmon Survey	EUN	660 m	MPC · JPL
894734	2018 DP_{13}	—	February 25, 2018	Mount Lemmon	Mount Lemmon Survey	EUN	860 m	MPC · JPL
894735	2018 EA_{1}	—	March 7, 2018	Haleakala	Pan-STARRS 1	APO	240 m	MPC · JPL
894736	2018 EP_{3}	—	January 23, 2018	Mount Lemmon	Mount Lemmon Survey	H	440 m	MPC · JPL
894737	2018 ET_{8}	—	March 7, 2018	Haleakala	Pan-STARRS 1	H	370 m	MPC · JPL
894738	2018 EF_{10}	—	February 28, 2014	Haleakala	Pan-STARRS 1	·	900 m	MPC · JPL
894739	2018 EW_{10}	—	January 22, 2018	Mount Lemmon	Mount Lemmon Survey	H	350 m	MPC · JPL
894740	2018 EM_{12}	—	March 7, 2018	Haleakala	Pan-STARRS 1	·	790 m	MPC · JPL
894741	2018 EW_{13}	—	March 7, 2018	Haleakala	Pan-STARRS 1	·	960 m	MPC · JPL
894742	2018 EY_{13}	—	March 10, 2018	Haleakala	Pan-STARRS 1	·	930 m	MPC · JPL
894743	2018 ET_{16}	—	March 7, 2018	Haleakala	Pan-STARRS 1	·	900 m	MPC · JPL
894744	2018 EB_{27}	—	March 10, 2018	Haleakala	Pan-STARRS 1	L5	5.9 km	MPC · JPL
894745	2018 FM_{14}	—	March 17, 2018	Haleakala	Pan-STARRS 1	·	1.1 km	MPC · JPL
894746	2018 FT_{19}	—	May 4, 2014	Haleakala	Pan-STARRS 1	·	1.1 km	MPC · JPL
894747	2018 FC_{20}	—	March 17, 2018	Haleakala	Pan-STARRS 1	·	1.8 km	MPC · JPL
894748	2018 FQ_{22}	—	April 29, 2014	Haleakala	Pan-STARRS 1	ADE	1.2 km	MPC · JPL
894749	2018 FC_{26}	—	September 8, 2015	Haleakala	Pan-STARRS 1	MAR	620 m	MPC · JPL
894750	2018 FZ_{31}	—	March 18, 2018	Haleakala	Pan-STARRS 1	·	920 m	MPC · JPL
894751	2018 FJ_{32}	—	March 17, 2018	Haleakala	Pan-STARRS 1	·	940 m	MPC · JPL
894752	2018 FP_{32}	—	May 7, 2014	Haleakala	Pan-STARRS 1	EUN	780 m	MPC · JPL
894753	2018 FE_{33}	—	March 17, 2018	Haleakala	Pan-STARRS 1	·	1.4 km	MPC · JPL
894754	2018 FE_{39}	—	March 22, 2018	Mount Lemmon	Mount Lemmon Survey	·	1.0 km	MPC · JPL
894755	2018 FR_{41}	—	March 19, 2018	Mount Lemmon	Mount Lemmon Survey	H	330 m	MPC · JPL
894756	2018 FT_{44}	—	May 6, 2014	Haleakala	Pan-STARRS 1	·	890 m	MPC · JPL
894757	2018 FO_{45}	—	March 18, 2018	Haleakala	Pan-STARRS 1	·	1.2 km	MPC · JPL
894758	2018 FX_{45}	—	April 4, 2014	Haleakala	Pan-STARRS 1	·	740 m	MPC · JPL
894759	2018 FF_{50}	—	March 17, 2018	Mount Lemmon	Mount Lemmon Survey	H	350 m	MPC · JPL
894760	2018 FF_{52}	—	April 28, 2014	Cerro Tololo-DECam	DECam	·	960 m	MPC · JPL
894761	2018 FE_{53}	—	January 17, 2013	Kitt Peak	Spacewatch	·	1.1 km	MPC · JPL
894762	2018 FP_{53}	—	March 18, 2018	Haleakala	Pan-STARRS 1	·	1.2 km	MPC · JPL
894763	2018 FH_{55}	—	March 18, 2018	Haleakala	Pan-STARRS 1	·	760 m	MPC · JPL
894764	2018 FV_{55}	—	March 21, 2018	Mount Lemmon	Mount Lemmon Survey	(5)	820 m	MPC · JPL
894765	2018 FD_{56}	—	March 18, 2018	Haleakala	Pan-STARRS 1	·	800 m	MPC · JPL
894766	2018 FV_{56}	—	December 2, 2005	Mauna Kea	A. Boattini	·	690 m	MPC · JPL
894767	2018 FA_{58}	—	October 18, 2012	Haleakala	Pan-STARRS 1	·	730 m	MPC · JPL
894768	2018 FU_{59}	—	March 18, 2018	Haleakala	Pan-STARRS 1	MAR	670 m	MPC · JPL
894769	2018 FR_{76}	—	March 18, 2018	Haleakala	Pan-STARRS 1	·	1.1 km	MPC · JPL
894770	2018 GP_{13}	—	April 9, 2018	Mount Lemmon	Mount Lemmon Survey	H	340 m	MPC · JPL
894771	2018 GD_{14}	—	April 12, 2018	Haleakala	Pan-STARRS 1	·	1.1 km	MPC · JPL
894772	2018 GG_{14}	—	April 12, 2018	Haleakala	Pan-STARRS 1	EUN	890 m	MPC · JPL
894773	2018 GS_{15}	—	April 12, 2018	Haleakala	Pan-STARRS 1	·	880 m	MPC · JPL
894774	2018 GL_{16}	—	April 11, 2018	Mount Lemmon	Mount Lemmon Survey	H	400 m	MPC · JPL
894775	2018 GW_{16}	—	April 9, 2018	XuYi	PMO NEO Survey Program	H	460 m	MPC · JPL
894776	2018 GB_{17}	—	September 19, 1998	Apache Point	SDSS	·	1.1 km	MPC · JPL
894777	2018 GE_{17}	—	April 15, 2018	Mount Lemmon	Mount Lemmon Survey	·	1.0 km	MPC · JPL
894778	2018 GY_{17}	—	April 12, 2018	Haleakala	Pan-STARRS 1	·	1.1 km	MPC · JPL
894779	2018 GY_{18}	—	April 8, 2018	Mount Lemmon	Mount Lemmon Survey	HNS	790 m	MPC · JPL
894780	2018 GL_{19}	—	April 5, 2018	Mount Lemmon	Mount Lemmon Survey	H	370 m	MPC · JPL
894781	2018 GP_{19}	—	April 10, 2018	Mount Lemmon	Mount Lemmon Survey	·	750 m	MPC · JPL
894782	2018 GY_{20}	—	April 13, 2018	Haleakala	Pan-STARRS 1	·	1.3 km	MPC · JPL
894783	2018 GD_{21}	—	April 12, 2018	Haleakala	Pan-STARRS 1	·	520 m	MPC · JPL
894784	2018 GS_{21}	—	April 15, 2018	Mount Lemmon	Mount Lemmon Survey	·	980 m	MPC · JPL
894785	2018 GE_{23}	—	April 11, 2018	Mount Lemmon	Mount Lemmon Survey	·	1.3 km	MPC · JPL
894786	2018 GA_{25}	—	April 24, 2014	Haleakala	Pan-STARRS 1	EUN	680 m	MPC · JPL
894787	2018 GR_{25}	—	April 5, 2014	Haleakala	Pan-STARRS 1	·	770 m	MPC · JPL
894788	2018 GY_{25}	—	April 13, 2018	Haleakala	Pan-STARRS 1	·	1.0 km	MPC · JPL
894789	2018 GZ_{37}	—	March 6, 2022	Haleakala	Pan-STARRS 2	·	1.1 km	MPC · JPL
894790	2018 HM_{3}	—	March 27, 2009	Mount Lemmon	Mount Lemmon Survey	·	1.2 km	MPC · JPL
894791	2018 HP_{5}	—	April 16, 2018	Haleakala	Pan-STARRS 1	·	880 m	MPC · JPL
894792	2018 HY_{5}	—	April 23, 2018	Mount Lemmon	Mount Lemmon Survey	·	1.1 km	MPC · JPL
894793	2018 HO_{6}	—	April 23, 2018	Mount Lemmon	Mount Lemmon Survey	·	1.1 km	MPC · JPL
894794	2018 HD_{7}	—	March 18, 2018	Haleakala	Pan-STARRS 1	·	960 m	MPC · JPL
894795	2018 HP_{7}	—	April 21, 2018	Mount Lemmon	Mount Lemmon Survey	·	1.4 km	MPC · JPL
894796	2018 HT_{7}	—	April 21, 2018	Mount Lemmon	Mount Lemmon Survey	·	1.5 km	MPC · JPL
894797	2018 HA_{9}	—	April 23, 2018	Mount Lemmon	Mount Lemmon Survey	·	590 m	MPC · JPL
894798	2018 HX_{9}	—	April 21, 2018	Mount Lemmon	Mount Lemmon Survey	ADE	1.4 km	MPC · JPL
894799	2018 HO_{10}	—	May 6, 2014	Haleakala	Pan-STARRS 1	·	900 m	MPC · JPL
894800	2018 HL_{11}	—	March 24, 2012	Mount Lemmon	Mount Lemmon Survey	·	2.1 km	MPC · JPL

== 894801–894900 ==
back to top

Designation			Discovery			Properties		Ref
Permanent	Provisional	Named after	Date	Site	Discoverer(s)	Category	Diam.	Ref
894801	2018 JO_{4}	—	May 10, 2018	ESA OGS	ESA OGS	·	1.2 km	MPC · JPL
894802	2018 JV_{6}	—	May 13, 2018	Mount Lemmon	Mount Lemmon Survey	·	1.2 km	MPC · JPL
894803	2018 JR_{7}	—	May 15, 2018	Mount Lemmon	Mount Lemmon Survey	·	1.2 km	MPC · JPL
894804	2018 JQ_{11}	—	May 12, 2018	Mount Lemmon	Mount Lemmon Survey	(1547)	1 km	MPC · JPL
894805	2018 JR_{11}	—	May 13, 2018	ESA OGS	ESA OGS	·	820 m	MPC · JPL
894806	2018 JA_{12}	—	May 10, 2018	Kitt Peak	Spacewatch	·	1.1 km	MPC · JPL
894807	2018 KL_{4}	—	May 18, 2018	Mount Lemmon	Mount Lemmon Survey	·	1.2 km	MPC · JPL
894808	2018 KB_{5}	—	May 18, 2018	Mount Lemmon	Mount Lemmon Survey	·	710 m	MPC · JPL
894809	2018 KH_{5}	—	May 16, 2018	Mount Lemmon	Mount Lemmon Survey	·	1.0 km	MPC · JPL
894810	2018 KB_{7}	—	May 20, 2018	Haleakala	Pan-STARRS 1	·	930 m	MPC · JPL
894811	2018 KS_{7}	—	May 18, 2018	Mount Lemmon	Mount Lemmon Survey	·	930 m	MPC · JPL
894812	2018 KZ_{7}	—	May 21, 2014	Haleakala	Pan-STARRS 1	KON	1.6 km	MPC · JPL
894813	2018 KR_{9}	—	May 21, 2018	Haleakala	Pan-STARRS 1	·	1.3 km	MPC · JPL
894814	2018 KH_{10}	—	May 19, 2018	Haleakala	Pan-STARRS 1	·	1.4 km	MPC · JPL
894815	2018 KN_{10}	—	May 19, 2018	Haleakala	Pan-STARRS 1	·	1.0 km	MPC · JPL
894816	2018 KP_{10}	—	May 18, 2018	Mount Lemmon	Mount Lemmon Survey	·	900 m	MPC · JPL
894817	2018 KF_{15}	—	May 19, 2018	Haleakala	Pan-STARRS 1	·	1.3 km	MPC · JPL
894818	2018 KM_{15}	—	December 2, 2008	Mount Lemmon	Mount Lemmon Survey	·	840 m	MPC · JPL
894819	2018 LF	—	June 2, 2018	Kitt Peak	Spacewatch	EUN	900 m	MPC · JPL
894820	2018 LL_{7}	—	June 27, 2014	Haleakala	Pan-STARRS 1	·	1.1 km	MPC · JPL
894821	2018 LX_{7}	—	May 20, 2018	Haleakala	Pan-STARRS 1	·	1.1 km	MPC · JPL
894822	2018 LA_{16}	—	June 15, 2018	Haleakala	Pan-STARRS 1	AMO	480 m	MPC · JPL
894823	2018 LE_{17}	—	June 13, 2018	Haleakala	Pan-STARRS 2	·	1.1 km	MPC · JPL
894824	2018 LT_{19}	—	June 15, 2018	Haleakala	Pan-STARRS 1	PHO	660 m	MPC · JPL
894825	2018 LT_{21}	—	June 15, 2018	Haleakala	Pan-STARRS 1	·	1.3 km	MPC · JPL
894826	2018 LW_{24}	—	June 8, 2018	Haleakala	Pan-STARRS 1	H	360 m	MPC · JPL
894827	2018 LJ_{25}	—	June 15, 2018	Haleakala	Pan-STARRS 1	·	1.6 km	MPC · JPL
894828	2018 LN_{25}	—	June 6, 2018	Haleakala	Pan-STARRS 1	EUN	890 m	MPC · JPL
894829	2018 LJ_{26}	—	June 15, 2018	Haleakala	Pan-STARRS 1	·	1.7 km	MPC · JPL
894830	2018 LH_{29}	—	June 15, 2018	Haleakala	Pan-STARRS 1	·	480 m	MPC · JPL
894831	2018 LN_{36}	—	June 5, 2018	Haleakala	Pan-STARRS 1	EUN	770 m	MPC · JPL
894832	2018 LS_{37}	—	June 6, 2018	Haleakala	Pan-STARRS 1	EUN	940 m	MPC · JPL
894833	2018 LE_{44}	—	September 9, 2015	Haleakala	Pan-STARRS 1	NYS	510 m	MPC · JPL
894834	2018 LY_{62}	—	June 14, 2018	Haleakala	Pan-STARRS 1	·	1.6 km	MPC · JPL
894835	2018 MY_{15}	—	June 17, 2018	Haleakala	Pan-STARRS 1	·	2.0 km	MPC · JPL
894836	2018 MK_{18}	—	June 21, 2018	Haleakala	Pan-STARRS 1	·	2.1 km	MPC · JPL
894837	2018 MX_{23}	—	June 23, 2018	Haleakala	Pan-STARRS 1	·	680 m	MPC · JPL
894838	2018 MY_{24}	—	June 18, 2018	Haleakala	Pan-STARRS 1	L4	6.0 km	MPC · JPL
894839	2018 MB_{27}	—	June 21, 2018	Haleakala	Pan-STARRS 1	(895)	2.7 km	MPC · JPL
894840	2018 MX_{29}	—	June 19, 2018	Haleakala	Pan-STARRS 1	(18466)	1.6 km	MPC · JPL
894841	2018 NF_{13}	—	July 10, 2018	Haleakala	Pan-STARRS 1	·	2.6 km	MPC · JPL
894842	2018 NX_{15}	—	July 9, 2018	Haleakala	Pan-STARRS 1	·	2.6 km	MPC · JPL
894843	2018 NB_{19}	—	July 12, 2018	Haleakala	Pan-STARRS 2	·	2.5 km	MPC · JPL
894844	2018 NM_{21}	—	July 10, 2018	Haleakala	Pan-STARRS 1	·	2.1 km	MPC · JPL
894845	2018 NQ_{33}	—	July 12, 2018	Haleakala	Pan-STARRS 1	·	780 m	MPC · JPL
894846	2018 NV_{37}	—	July 12, 2018	Haleakala	Pan-STARRS 1	·	480 m	MPC · JPL
894847	2018 NV_{42}	—	July 9, 2018	Haleakala	Pan-STARRS 1	·	1.8 km	MPC · JPL
894848	2018 NM_{44}	—	July 4, 2018	Haleakala	Pan-STARRS 1	·	1.2 km	MPC · JPL
894849	2018 NS_{52}	—	July 11, 2018	Haleakala	Pan-STARRS 1	·	1.4 km	MPC · JPL
894850	2018 NO_{74}	—	November 23, 2008	Kitt Peak	Spacewatch	·	2.0 km	MPC · JPL
894851	2018 NA_{79}	—	November 20, 2014	Haleakala	Pan-STARRS 1	·	1.9 km	MPC · JPL
894852	2018 PV_{6}	—	December 31, 2015	Mount Lemmon	Mount Lemmon Survey	·	680 m	MPC · JPL
894853	2018 PN_{7}	—	February 12, 2018	Haleakala	Pan-STARRS 1	·	960 m	MPC · JPL
894854	2018 PY_{10}	—	August 19, 2014	Haleakala	Pan-STARRS 1	·	1.3 km	MPC · JPL
894855	2018 PG_{21}	—	August 8, 2018	Haleakala	Pan-STARRS 1	APO	460 m	MPC · JPL
894856	2018 PT_{41}	—	August 6, 2018	Haleakala	Pan-STARRS 1	EOS	1.7 km	MPC · JPL
894857	2018 PP_{46}	—	August 14, 2018	Haleakala	Pan-STARRS 1	(895)	2.2 km	MPC · JPL
894858	2018 PR_{48}	—	May 5, 2014	Cerro Tololo-DECam	DECam	·	470 m	MPC · JPL
894859	2018 PC_{55}	—	August 8, 2018	Haleakala	Pan-STARRS 1	·	2.1 km	MPC · JPL
894860	2018 PU_{55}	—	March 6, 2016	Haleakala	Pan-STARRS 1	·	1.8 km	MPC · JPL
894861	2018 PO_{56}	—	August 13, 2018	Haleakala	Pan-STARRS 1	·	1.6 km	MPC · JPL
894862	2018 PT_{56}	—	August 5, 2018	Haleakala	Pan-STARRS 1	·	1.2 km	MPC · JPL
894863	2018 PC_{62}	—	August 8, 2018	Haleakala	Pan-STARRS 1	·	740 m	MPC · JPL
894864	2018 PP_{65}	—	August 5, 2018	Haleakala	Pan-STARRS 1	TIR	1.9 km	MPC · JPL
894865	2018 PP_{67}	—	August 12, 2018	Haleakala	Pan-STARRS 1	·	1.7 km	MPC · JPL
894866	2018 PR_{67}	—	August 8, 2018	Haleakala	Pan-STARRS 1	·	1.7 km	MPC · JPL
894867	2018 PQ_{72}	—	January 26, 2015	Haleakala	Pan-STARRS 1	·	1.9 km	MPC · JPL
894868	2018 PO_{73}	—	May 20, 2014	Haleakala	Pan-STARRS 1	·	540 m	MPC · JPL
894869	2018 PS_{73}	—	August 7, 2018	Haleakala	Pan-STARRS 1	·	770 m	MPC · JPL
894870	2018 PZ_{74}	—	August 5, 2018	Haleakala	Pan-STARRS 1	·	700 m	MPC · JPL
894871	2018 PB_{84}	—	November 1, 2013	Catalina	CSS	·	2.1 km	MPC · JPL
894872	2018 PH_{121}	—	August 8, 2018	Haleakala	Pan-STARRS 1	·	1.4 km	MPC · JPL
894873	2018 PC_{145}	—	August 5, 2018	Haleakala	Pan-STARRS 1	·	2.3 km	MPC · JPL
894874	2018 PB_{153}	—	August 5, 2018	Haleakala	Pan-STARRS 1	·	2.5 km	MPC · JPL
894875	2018 PJ_{154}	—	August 5, 2018	Haleakala	Pan-STARRS 1	·	1.7 km	MPC · JPL
894876	2018 PS_{155}	—	January 18, 2015	Mount Lemmon	Mount Lemmon Survey	·	2.0 km	MPC · JPL
894877	2018 PA_{158}	—	November 17, 2014	Haleakala	Pan-STARRS 1	·	1.7 km	MPC · JPL
894878	2018 PL_{158}	—	August 14, 2018	Haleakala	Pan-STARRS 1	·	2.0 km	MPC · JPL
894879	2018 PV_{158}	—	August 13, 2018	Haleakala	Pan-STARRS 1	·	1.8 km	MPC · JPL
894880	2018 PY_{162}	—	January 20, 2015	Haleakala	Pan-STARRS 1	·	1.4 km	MPC · JPL
894881	2018 QD_{15}	—	October 4, 2007	Catalina	CSS	T_{j} (2.96)	2.2 km	MPC · JPL
894882	2018 QP_{19}	—	January 16, 2015	Haleakala	Pan-STARRS 1	·	1.7 km	MPC · JPL
894883	2018 QU_{23}	—	August 18, 2018	Haleakala	Pan-STARRS 1	EOS	1.4 km	MPC · JPL
894884	2018 QQ_{34}	—	August 18, 2018	Haleakala	Pan-STARRS 1	·	1.9 km	MPC · JPL
894885	2018 RR_{12}	—	January 20, 2013	Kitt Peak	Spacewatch	·	570 m	MPC · JPL
894886	2018 RY_{24}	—	February 16, 2015	Haleakala	Pan-STARRS 1	TIR	1.8 km	MPC · JPL
894887	2018 RM_{35}	—	August 14, 2018	Haleakala	Pan-STARRS 1	T_{j} (2.98)	2.7 km	MPC · JPL
894888	2018 RW_{39}	—	September 12, 2018	Mount Lemmon	Mount Lemmon Survey	·	2.0 km	MPC · JPL
894889	2018 RF_{57}	—	October 5, 2013	Haleakala	Pan-STARRS 1	EOS	1.2 km	MPC · JPL
894890	2018 RW_{61}	—	November 19, 2012	Kitt Peak	Spacewatch	·	650 m	MPC · JPL
894891	2018 RO_{62}	—	September 8, 2018	Mount Lemmon	Mount Lemmon Survey	·	2.7 km	MPC · JPL
894892	2018 RA_{78}	—	September 9, 2018	Mount Lemmon	Mount Lemmon Survey	EOS	1.2 km	MPC · JPL
894893	2018 RR_{78}	—	January 14, 2015	Haleakala	Pan-STARRS 1	·	1.3 km	MPC · JPL
894894	2018 RG_{102}	—	February 5, 2009	Kitt Peak	Spacewatch	T_{j} (2.98)	2.2 km	MPC · JPL
894895	2018 SA_{19}	—	September 29, 2018	Mount Lemmon	Mount Lemmon Survey	T_{j} (2.97)	2.6 km	MPC · JPL
894896	2018 SJ_{21}	—	September 19, 2018	Haleakala	Pan-STARRS 2	·	1.8 km	MPC · JPL
894897	2018 TT_{16}	—	October 6, 2018	Mount Lemmon	Mount Lemmon Survey	·	2.0 km	MPC · JPL
894898	2018 TR_{30}	—	October 5, 2018	Mount Lemmon	Mount Lemmon Survey	·	630 m	MPC · JPL
894899	2018 TN_{34}	—	October 4, 2018	Haleakala	Pan-STARRS 2	·	2.2 km	MPC · JPL
894900	2018 TB_{44}	—	October 5, 2018	Haleakala	Pan-STARRS 2	·	1.8 km	MPC · JPL

== 894901–895000 ==
back to top

Designation			Discovery			Properties		Ref
Permanent	Provisional	Named after	Date	Site	Discoverer(s)	Category	Diam.	Ref
894901	2018 TM_{45}	—	October 6, 2018	Mount Lemmon	Mount Lemmon Survey	·	1.9 km	MPC · JPL
894902	2018 TF_{47}	—	October 6, 2018	Mount Lemmon	Mount Lemmon Survey	·	510 m	MPC · JPL
894903	2018 TL_{47}	—	October 3, 2018	Haleakala	Pan-STARRS 2	·	1.5 km	MPC · JPL
894904	2018 TN_{48}	—	October 10, 2018	Haleakala	Pan-STARRS 2	·	2.0 km	MPC · JPL
894905	2018 TA_{51}	—	October 4, 2018	Haleakala	Pan-STARRS 2	T_{j} (2.91)	2.3 km	MPC · JPL
894906	2018 TZ_{62}	—	October 10, 2018	Mount Lemmon	Mount Lemmon Survey	·	2.4 km	MPC · JPL
894907	2018 TC_{67}	—	October 3, 2018	Haleakala	Pan-STARRS 2	EOS	1.4 km	MPC · JPL
894908	2018 TE_{67}	—	January 22, 2015	Haleakala	Pan-STARRS 1	·	1.7 km	MPC · JPL
894909	2018 TW_{67}	—	October 5, 2018	Mount Lemmon	Mount Lemmon Survey	VER	2.1 km	MPC · JPL
894910	2018 TP_{83}	—	October 5, 2018	Mount Lemmon	Mount Lemmon Survey	·	1.9 km	MPC · JPL
894911	2018 UZ_{8}	—	December 26, 2014	Haleakala	Pan-STARRS 1	·	830 m	MPC · JPL
894912	2018 UV_{9}	—	November 2, 2007	Kitt Peak	Spacewatch	MAS	480 m	MPC · JPL
894913	2018 UU_{11}	—	November 3, 2005	Mount Lemmon	Mount Lemmon Survey	·	510 m	MPC · JPL
894914	2018 UX_{16}	—	January 5, 2013	Mount Lemmon	Mount Lemmon Survey	·	530 m	MPC · JPL
894915	2018 UH_{23}	—	May 1, 2016	Cerro Tololo-DECam	DECam	EOS	1.3 km	MPC · JPL
894916	2018 UC_{32}	—	October 18, 2018	Mount Lemmon	Mount Lemmon Survey	·	1.9 km	MPC · JPL
894917	2018 UR_{33}	—	October 17, 2018	Haleakala	Pan-STARRS 2	·	2.2 km	MPC · JPL
894918	2018 UD_{35}	—	January 27, 2015	Haleakala	Pan-STARRS 1	EOS	1.2 km	MPC · JPL
894919	2018 UE_{35}	—	October 18, 2018	Mount Lemmon	Mount Lemmon Survey	·	1.9 km	MPC · JPL
894920	2018 UK_{40}	—	December 4, 2015	Haleakala	Pan-STARRS 1	·	390 m	MPC · JPL
894921	2018 UP_{40}	—	July 26, 2017	Haleakala	Pan-STARRS 1	·	2.0 km	MPC · JPL
894922	2018 UT_{40}	—	October 17, 2018	Haleakala	Pan-STARRS 2	·	1.8 km	MPC · JPL
894923	2018 UD_{49}	—	October 20, 2018	Mount Lemmon	Mount Lemmon Survey	·	1.9 km	MPC · JPL
894924	2018 VL_{7}	—	November 2, 2018	WISE	WISE	APO	240 m	MPC · JPL
894925	2018 VC_{32}	—	January 24, 2006	Kitt Peak	Spacewatch	·	400 m	MPC · JPL
894926	2018 VF_{34}	—	April 9, 2016	Haleakala	Pan-STARRS 1	·	460 m	MPC · JPL
894927	2018 VQ_{41}	—	October 11, 2012	Mount Lemmon	Mount Lemmon Survey	·	2.1 km	MPC · JPL
894928	2018 VY_{50}	—	December 21, 2008	Kitt Peak	Spacewatch	·	400 m	MPC · JPL
894929	2018 VQ_{52}	—	August 23, 2017	Haleakala	Pan-STARRS 1	·	2.1 km	MPC · JPL
894930	2018 VJ_{69}	—	November 6, 2005	Mount Lemmon	Mount Lemmon Survey	·	460 m	MPC · JPL
894931	2018 VC_{95}	—	January 7, 2016	Haleakala	Pan-STARRS 1	·	420 m	MPC · JPL
894932	2018 VJ_{97}	—	January 26, 2012	Mount Lemmon	Mount Lemmon Survey	·	660 m	MPC · JPL
894933	2018 VN_{100}	—	December 31, 2007	Kitt Peak	Spacewatch	NYS	650 m	MPC · JPL
894934	2018 VX_{124}	—	November 8, 2018	XuYi	PMO NEO Survey Program	·	430 m	MPC · JPL
894935	2018 VP_{125}	—	November 7, 2018	Mount Lemmon	Mount Lemmon Survey	·	2.3 km	MPC · JPL
894936	2018 VC_{126}	—	November 8, 2018	Haleakala	Pan-STARRS 2	·	2.1 km	MPC · JPL
894937	2018 VU_{126}	—	November 3, 2018	Kitt Peak	Spacewatch	·	2.7 km	MPC · JPL
894938	2018 VL_{131}	—	November 9, 2018	Haleakala	Pan-STARRS 2	·	540 m	MPC · JPL
894939	2018 VQ_{131}	—	January 23, 2015	Haleakala	Pan-STARRS 1	·	1.9 km	MPC · JPL
894940	2018 VC_{132}	—	November 2, 2018	Mount Lemmon	Mount Lemmon Survey	VER	2.3 km	MPC · JPL
894941	2018 VR_{149}	—	November 9, 2018	Haleakala	Pan-STARRS 2	·	1.0 km	MPC · JPL
894942	2018 VN_{150}	—	November 1, 2018	Mount Lemmon	Mount Lemmon Survey	·	540 m	MPC · JPL
894943	2018 VR_{150}	—	November 8, 2018	Mount Lemmon	Mount Lemmon Survey	·	760 m	MPC · JPL
894944	2018 XM_{14}	—	November 26, 2014	Mount Lemmon	Mount Lemmon Survey	·	1.4 km	MPC · JPL
894945	2018 XD_{19}	—	July 30, 2017	Haleakala	Pan-STARRS 1	PHO	880 m	MPC · JPL
894946	2018 XV_{22}	—	December 14, 2018	Haleakala	Pan-STARRS 1	·	470 m	MPC · JPL
894947	2018 XG_{25}	—	December 13, 2018	Haleakala	Pan-STARRS 1	H	380 m	MPC · JPL
894948	2018 XN_{25}	—	December 10, 2018	Mount Lemmon	Mount Lemmon Survey	·	2.3 km	MPC · JPL
894949	2018 XT_{26}	—	December 12, 2018	Haleakala	Pan-STARRS 1	·	790 m	MPC · JPL
894950	2018 XA_{34}	—	January 22, 2015	Haleakala	Pan-STARRS 1	MAR	770 m	MPC · JPL
894951	2018 XE_{42}	—	November 26, 2014	Haleakala	Pan-STARRS 1	·	650 m	MPC · JPL
894952	2018 YY_{11}	—	December 31, 2018	Haleakala	Pan-STARRS 1	PHO	480 m	MPC · JPL
894953	2018 YQ_{14}	—	December 17, 2018	Haleakala	Pan-STARRS 1	·	460 m	MPC · JPL
894954	2019 AB_{8}	—	April 3, 2017	Mount Lemmon	Mount Lemmon Survey	·	370 m	MPC · JPL
894955	2019 AX_{10}	—	May 19, 2017	Mount Lemmon	Mount Lemmon Survey	·	330 m	MPC · JPL
894956	2019 AQ_{18}	—	February 5, 2016	Haleakala	Pan-STARRS 1	PHO	640 m	MPC · JPL
894957	2019 AA_{45}	—	February 27, 2009	Catalina	CSS	·	520 m	MPC · JPL
894958	2019 AE_{48}	—	January 8, 2019	Haleakala	Pan-STARRS 1	HNS	730 m	MPC · JPL
894959	2019 AO_{55}	—	January 3, 2019	Haleakala	Pan-STARRS 1	·	500 m	MPC · JPL
894960	2019 AN_{63}	—	February 24, 2012	Mount Lemmon	Mount Lemmon Survey	·	640 m	MPC · JPL
894961	2019 AT_{63}	—	February 16, 2012	Haleakala	Pan-STARRS 1	·	510 m	MPC · JPL
894962	2019 AH_{64}	—	January 8, 2019	Haleakala	Pan-STARRS 1	·	720 m	MPC · JPL
894963	2019 AL_{66}	—	January 9, 2019	Haleakala	Pan-STARRS 1	·	1.0 km	MPC · JPL
894964	2019 AD_{67}	—	January 8, 2019	Haleakala	Pan-STARRS 1	·	730 m	MPC · JPL
894965	2019 AN_{67}	—	January 3, 2019	Haleakala	Pan-STARRS 1	·	1.0 km	MPC · JPL
894966	2019 AB_{68}	—	January 3, 2019	Haleakala	Pan-STARRS 1	·	490 m	MPC · JPL
894967	2019 AC_{69}	—	January 3, 2019	Haleakala	Pan-STARRS 1	H	290 m	MPC · JPL
894968	2019 AN_{70}	—	January 8, 2019	Haleakala	Pan-STARRS 1	·	740 m	MPC · JPL
894969	2019 AP_{77}	—	January 7, 2019	Haleakala	Pan-STARRS 1	PHO	660 m	MPC · JPL
894970	2019 AU_{78}	—	April 12, 2016	Haleakala	Pan-STARRS 1	·	460 m	MPC · JPL
894971	2019 AK_{80}	—	January 10, 2019	Haleakala	Pan-STARRS 1	·	690 m	MPC · JPL
894972	2019 AQ_{87}	—	January 3, 2019	Haleakala	Pan-STARRS 1	HNS	690 m	MPC · JPL
894973	2019 AB_{90}	—	November 11, 2014	Haleakala	Pan-STARRS 1	·	530 m	MPC · JPL
894974	2019 AC_{90}	—	January 7, 2019	Haleakala	Pan-STARRS 1	·	1.1 km	MPC · JPL
894975	2019 AS_{91}	—	January 14, 2019	Haleakala	Pan-STARRS 1	·	490 m	MPC · JPL
894976	2019 AJ_{93}	—	January 7, 2019	Haleakala	Pan-STARRS 1	·	650 m	MPC · JPL
894977	2019 AT_{104}	—	January 3, 2019	Haleakala	Pan-STARRS 1	·	1.2 km	MPC · JPL
894978	2019 AA_{124}	—	January 11, 2019	Haleakala	Pan-STARRS 1	PHO	680 m	MPC · JPL
894979	2019 AW_{138}	—	January 11, 2019	Haleakala	Pan-STARRS 1	H	240 m	MPC · JPL
894980	2019 AV_{143}	—	September 24, 2017	Mount Lemmon	Mount Lemmon Survey	PHO	570 m	MPC · JPL
894981	2019 BF_{8}	—	March 14, 2016	Mount Lemmon	Mount Lemmon Survey	·	490 m	MPC · JPL
894982	2019 BF_{10}	—	January 16, 2019	Haleakala	Pan-STARRS 2	H	460 m	MPC · JPL
894983	2019 BL_{12}	—	March 6, 2016	Haleakala	Pan-STARRS 1	·	550 m	MPC · JPL
894984	2019 CA_{6}	—	December 13, 2018	Haleakala	Pan-STARRS 1	PHO	800 m	MPC · JPL
894985	2019 CR_{7}	—	February 3, 2012	Kitt Peak	Spacewatch	·	560 m	MPC · JPL
894986	2019 CZ_{19}	—	October 9, 2010	Mount Lemmon	Mount Lemmon Survey	·	650 m	MPC · JPL
894987	2019 CR_{20}	—	May 1, 2016	Haleakala	Pan-STARRS 1	·	500 m	MPC · JPL
894988	2019 CR_{21}	—	February 5, 2019	Haleakala	Pan-STARRS 1	·	1.6 km	MPC · JPL
894989	2019 CE_{22}	—	December 5, 2010	Kitt Peak	Spacewatch	H	410 m	MPC · JPL
894990	2019 CZ_{22}	—	February 5, 2019	Haleakala	Pan-STARRS 2	·	790 m	MPC · JPL
894991	2019 CX_{29}	—	February 4, 2019	Haleakala	Pan-STARRS 1	·	1.1 km	MPC · JPL
894992	2019 DR_{2}	—	February 28, 2019	Mount Lemmon	Mount Lemmon Survey	·	570 m	MPC · JPL
894993	2019 EQ_{4}	—	April 15, 2012	Haleakala	Pan-STARRS 1	·	780 m	MPC · JPL
894994	2019 EW_{4}	—	March 6, 2019	Mount Lemmon	Mount Lemmon Survey	H	420 m	MPC · JPL
894995	2019 FO_{3}	—	March 1, 2012	Mount Lemmon	Mount Lemmon Survey	·	660 m	MPC · JPL
894996	2019 FZ_{6}	—	May 20, 2015	Cerro Tololo-DECam	DECam	·	1.0 km	MPC · JPL
894997	2019 FP_{7}	—	March 31, 2019	Mount Lemmon	Mount Lemmon Survey	·	560 m	MPC · JPL
894998	2019 FQ_{11}	—	July 5, 2016	Haleakala	Pan-STARRS 1	·	910 m	MPC · JPL
894999	2019 FV_{16}	—	March 31, 2019	Mount Lemmon	Mount Lemmon Survey	·	1.0 km	MPC · JPL
895000	2019 FG_{19}	—	March 29, 2019	Mount Lemmon	Mount Lemmon Survey	V	400 m	MPC · JPL

back to top

== See also ==
- Meanings of minor-planet names: 894001–895000
