= Ronald Pettersson =

Swedish ice hockey player (1935–2010)

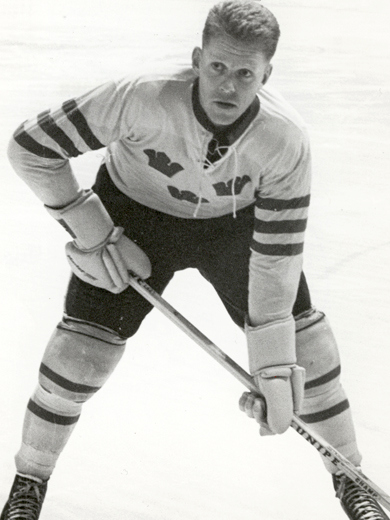
- Pettersson in the 1960s
- Born: 16 April 1935 Surahammar, Sweden
- Died: 6 March 2010 (aged 74) Gothenburg, Sweden
- Height: 6 ft 0 in (183 cm)
- Weight: 180 lb (82 kg; 12 st 12 lb)
- Position: Right wing
- Shot: Left
- Played for: Surahammars IF; Södertälje SK; Västra Frölunda IF
- Playing career: 1951–1967

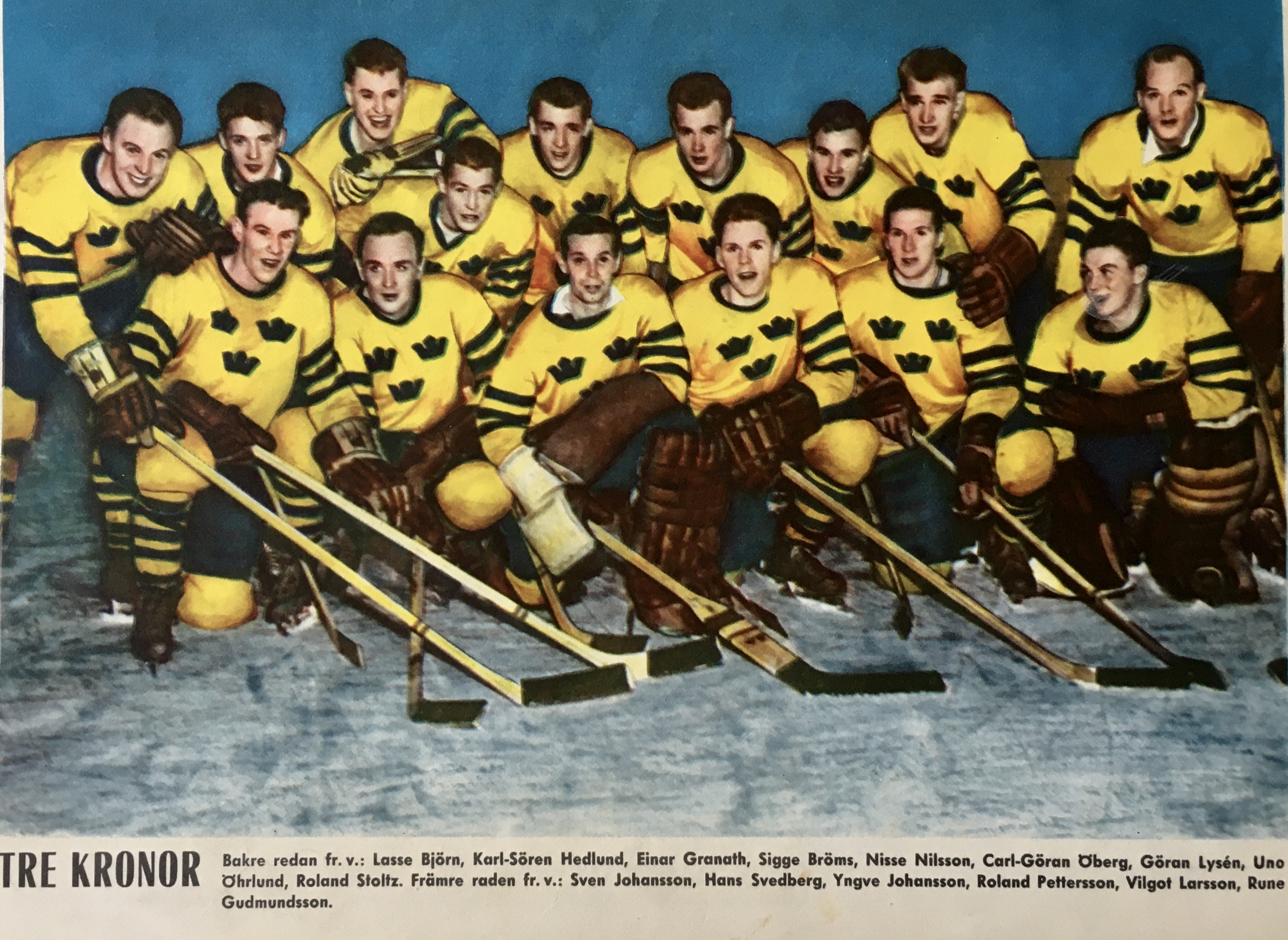
Team Sweden in November 1958, from the left, standing: Lasse Björn, Karl-Sören "Kalle" Hedlund, Einar Granath, Sigge Bröms, Nils "Double-Nisse" Nilsson, Carl-Göran "Lill-Stöveln" Öberg, Göran Lysén, Uno "Garvis" Öhrlund, Roland "Rolle" Stoltz; front row: Sven "Tumba" Johansson, Hasse Svedberg, Yngve Johansson, Roland "Sura-Pelle" Pettersson, Vilgot "Ville" Larsson and Rune Gudmundsson.

Erik Ronald Pettersson (16 April 1935 – 6 March 2010) was a Swedish ice hockey player. He played 252 international games for Sweden between 1955 and 1967, including thirteen World Championships and three Olympic Games. Between 1951 and 1967 Pettersson played for Surahammars IF, Södertälje SK and Västra Frölunda IF. He won the Swedish championship twice, in 1956 with Södertälje and in 1965 with Västra Frölunda. He won Guldpucken in 1959–60 as the most valuable player in Swedish Championship playoffs.

After suffering a career-ending injury in 1967, Pettersson took on the role as head coach for the Swedish national junior team from 1968 to 1974, the Swedish national senior team from 1974 to 1976, and the Norwegian national men's team from 1978 to 1981. He was inducted into the IIHF Hall of Fame in 2004, and his jersey #14 was retired by Västra Frölunda in 2002.

== Early life ==
Pettersson was born in Surahammar, a rural industrial town where the name Ronald was unusual, thus the locals nicknamed him Collman, after the famous actor Ronald Colman. Pettersson was a natural athletic talent, in his youth he played tennis and table tennis with good results. He started playing bandy as a goalkeeper since his skating was of poor quality, as he developed his skating ability he moved to the outfield. He played his first ice hockey game with Surahammars IF's senior team in an exhibition game against Avesta BK during the autumn of 1952.

== Playing career ==
During the 1952–53 season Pettersson debuted at age 17 for his hometown team Surahammars IF in Division 1, the highest level of ice hockey in Sweden at the time. He played five games, scoring no goals. The following season Pettersson played ten games, scoring nine goals, only one goal shy of the team's scoring leader Arne Holmgren. Surahammar were relegated to Division 2 for the 1954–55 season, where Pettersson set a new club record as he scored 23 goals in seven games. In 1955 Pettersson left Surahammar as he was enlisted to do conscript service in the Swedish Navy, stationed in Stockholm's archipelago. In Stockholm he was supposed to sign a contract with Djurgårdens IF, but rival club Södertälje SK were faster with the transfer papers and Pettersson signed with them instead. In 1956 he won the Swedish Championship with Södertälje, scoring one goal in the decisive game against Djurgården which Södertälje won 3–1.

== International play ==
Ronald Pettersson
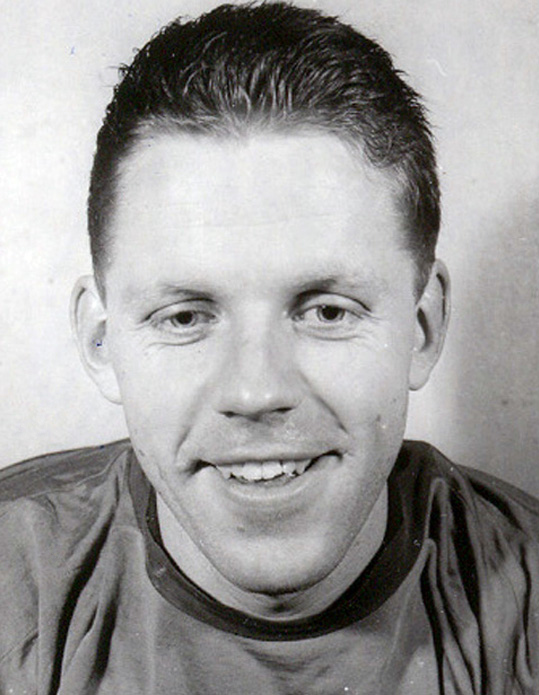

Medal record

Representing Sweden

Olympic
Silver medal – second place	1964 Innsbruck	Team

World Championships
Gold medal – first place	1957 Moscow	Team
Bronze medal – third place	1958 Oslo	Team
Gold medal – first place	1962 Colorado Springs	Team
Silver medal – second place	1963 Stockholm	Team
Bronze medal – third place	1965 Tampere	Team
Silver medal – second place	1967 Vienna	Team

Pettersson played for Sweden in all thirteen international championships between 1955 and 1967, totaling 252 games for the national team. Pettersson, a right winger, together with centre Nisse Nilsson and left winger Lars Erik Lundvall, formed the legendary ungdomskedjan (youth line), one of the most successful and considered as Tre Kronor's best line ever.

He made his debut for Juniorkronorna in February 1954, and for Tre Kronor when they played two games against Norway in Stockholm on 26 and 27 November 1954. He was selected to Tre Kronor's roster for the 1955 World Championship, he scored his first tournament goal, assisted by Sven "Tumba" Johansson, in a 9–0 win against Poland in the last game of the championship.

== Playing style ==
Pettersson was a hard-working right winger, who played an efficient game and made every minute on the ice count. He was a fast skater, and had a well-developed goal-scoring ability.

== Legacy ==
With his 252 games Pettersson is ranked fourth all-time in games played for Tre Kronor. His feat was long considered an unbreakable record, but he was surpassed by Thomas Rundqvist in 1993 and later by Jonas Bergqvist and Jörgen Jönsson.

He was inducted to the International Ice Hockey Federation's (IIHF) Hall of Fame in 2004.

He became the fiftieth ice hockey player to receive Stora Grabbars Märke.

His jersey #14 is retired by Frölunda. In 2003 he was inducted as an honour member in Surahammars IF.

== Career statistics ==
=== Regular season and playoffs ===
			Regular season					Playoffs
Season	Team	League	GP	G	A	Pts	PIM	GP	G	A	Pts	PIM
1952–53	Surahammars IF	Division 1	5	0	—	0	0	—	—	—	—	—
1953–54	Surahammars IF	Division 1	10	9	—	9	2	—	—	—	—	—
1954–55	Surahammars IF	Division 2	7	23	—	23	8	2	4	—	4	0
1955–56	Södertälje SK	Division 1	10	11	—	11	—	6	8	—	8	—
1956–57	Södertälje SK	Division 1	14	12	13	25	2	6	5	3	8	0
1957–58	Södertälje SK	Division 1	14	24	15	39	2	6	5	2	7	2
1958–59	Södertälje SK	Division 1	14	14	7	21	6	—	—	—	—	—
1959–60	Södertälje SK	Division 1	14	19	16	35	10	6	7	1	8	12
1960–61	Västra Frölunda IF	Division 2	14	33	—	33	—	6	9	—	9	—
1961–62	Västra Frölunda IF	Division 1	14	9	13	22	—	7	4	4	8	—
1962–63	Västra Frölunda IF	Division 1	13	23	14	37	—	7	3	1	4	—
1963–64	Västra Frölunda IF	Division 1	21	20	10	30	20	—	—	—	—	—
1964–65	Västra Frölunda IF	Division 1	14	3	6	9	23	14	14	2	16	2
1965–66	Västra Frölunda IF	Division 1	21	12	17	29	18	8	8	3	11	6
1966–67	Västra Frölunda IF	Division 1	20	16	13	29	14	7	4	3	7	0
1967–68	Västra Frölunda IF	Division 1	14	11	5	16	8	—	—	—	—	—
Division 1 totals			198	183	129	312	105	67	58	19	77	22
Division 2 totals			21	56	—	56	8	8	13	—	13	0

=== International ===
Year	Team	Event	GP	G	A	Pts	PIM
1955	Tre Kronor	WC	8	1	0	1	—
1956	Tre Kronor	OG	9	5	0	5	—
1957	Tre Kronor	WC	7	9	7	16	—
1958	Tre Kronor	WC	7	5	5	10	0
1959	Tre Kronor	WC	8	6	0	6	—
1960	Tre Kronor	OG	7	4	8	12	2
1961	Tre Kronor	WC	7	5	2	7	—
1962	Tre Kronor	WC	7	3	4	7	0
1963	Tre Kronor	WC	7	3	1	4	0
1964	Tre Kronor	OG	7	3	3	6	2
1965	Tre Kronor	WC	7	5	3	8	2
1966	Tre Kronor	WC	7	2	2	4	2
1967	Tre Kronor	WC	4	1	0	1	0

== Football career ==
Ronald Pettersson
Senior career*
Years	Team	Apps	(Gls)
1960–1961	IFK Göteborg	14	(4)
- * Club domestic league appearances and goals

Pettersson had a two-year stint with IFK Göteborg in Allsvenskan, the top-level football league in Sweden. When Pettersson was acquired by Västra Frölunda IF in 1960, Västra Frölunda's manager Anders Bernmar had talked IFK Göteborg into helping Västra Frölunda with the acquisition, after convincing them that Pettersson not only was a good ice hockey player but a good football player too. During the 1960 season, his first season with IFK, he scored two goals in eight matches in Allsvenskan, and fourteen goals in seven friendly matches. IFK Göteborg finished eight in Allsvenskan. The following season Pettersson scored two goals in six matches in Allsvenskan and matched the numbers in friendly matches. IFK Göteborg won bronze this season, Västra Frölunda had won promotion to Division 1 in ice hockey and Pettersson did not play football again.

== Notes ==
Preceded by Roland Stoltz	Golden Puck; 1960	Succeeded by Anders Andersson
