= Nils Nilsson (ice hockey) =

Swedish ice hockey player and footballer

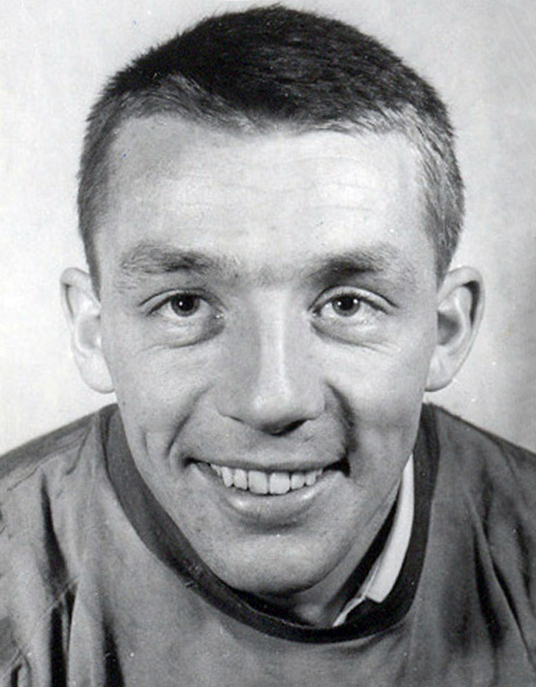
- Nilsson during the early 1960s
- Born: 8 March 1936; Forshaga, Sweden
- Died: 24 June 2017 (aged 81)
- Height: 181 cm (71 in)
Ice hockey career
- Position: Centre
- Played for: Forshaga IF; IK Göta; Leksands IF
- National team: Sweden
- Playing career: 1952–1969
Medal record
Representing Sweden
Olympic Games
Silver medal – second place	1964 Innsbruck	Team
World Championships
Gold medal – first place	1957 Moscow	Team
Bronze medal – third place	1958 Oslo	Team
Gold medal – first place	1962 Colorado Springs/Denver	Team
Silver medal – second place	1963 Stockholm	Team
Bronze medal – third place	1965 Tampere	Team
Silver medal – second place	1967 Vienna	Team
Association football career
Senior career*
Years	Team	Apps	(Gls)
- Karlstad BK
- IK Göta
1959	Djurgårdens IF	2	(1)
- * Club domestic league appearances and goals

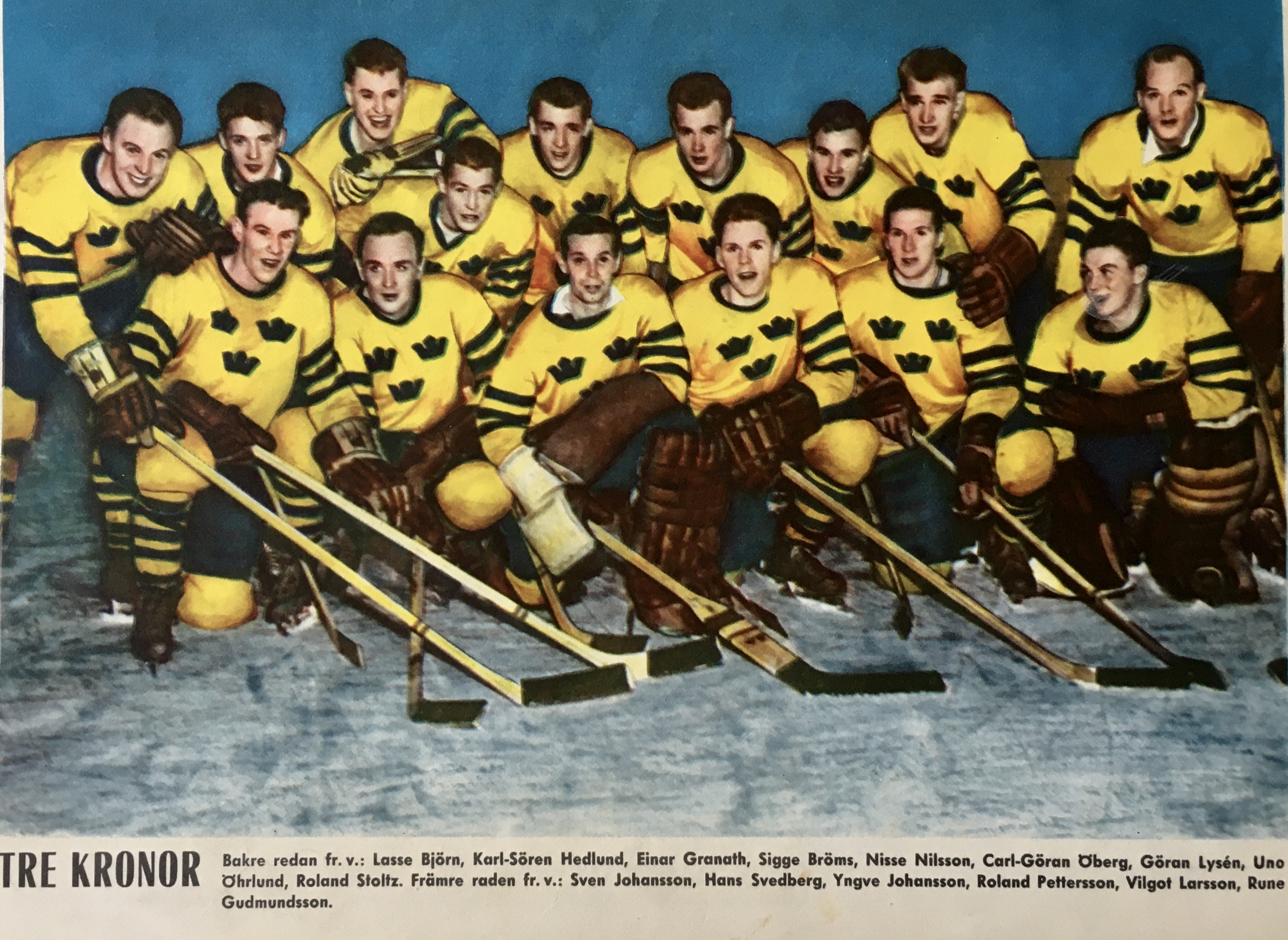
Tre Kronor in November 1958, from the left, standing: Lasse Björn, Karl-Sören "Kalle" Hedlund, Einar Granath, Sigge Bröms, Nils "Double-Nisse" Nilsson, Carl-Göran "Lill-Stöveln" Öberg, Göran Lysén, Uno "Garvis" Öhrlund, Roland "Rolle" Stoltz; front row: Sven "Tumba" Johansson, Hasse Svedberg, Yngve Johansson, Roland "Sura-Pelle" Pettersson, Vilgot "Ville" Larsson and Rune Gudmundsson.

Nils Erik "Dubbel-Nisse" Nilsson (8 March 1936 – 24 June 2017) was a Swedish ice hockey forward and footballer. Between 1954 and 1967 he played 205 international matches and scored 131 goals, which is the second-best scoring result, behind that of Sven Tumba. He won the world title in 1957 and 1962, finishing second in 1963 and 1967 and third in 1958 and 1965. He competed at the 1956, 1960 and 1964 Winter Olympics, and finished in fourth, fifth and second place, respectively. He was the best forward of the 1960 tournament and was selected to the all-star team at the 1962 World Championships. In 2002, he was inducted into the International Ice Hockey Federation Hall of Fame.

Nilsson won only one national title, in his last season (1969). Yet he was awarded the Guldpucken award in 1966 as the best Swedish player and the Rinkens riddare award in 1967 for sportsmanlike behavior, and was selected to the Swedish all-star team in 1959, 1960, 1962, 1965 and 1967.

Nilsson also played football with Djurgårdens IF, IK Göta and Karlstad BK, and won the national title with Djurgården in 1959. After retiring from competitions he worked as a product developer with Jofa, a Swedish manufacturer of sporting equipment.

== Career statistics ==
=== International ===
Year	Team	Event	GP	G	A	Pts	PIM
1957	Sweden	WC	7	10	6	16	—
1958	Sweden	WC	7	7	0	7	2
1960	Sweden	OLY	7	7	5	12	4
1962	Sweden	WC	7	11	6	17	—
1963	Sweden	WC	6	6	1	7	—
1964	Sweden	OLY	7	5	0	5	—
1965	Sweden	WC	7	4	3	7	—
1966	Sweden	WC	7	3	0	3	0
1967	Sweden	WC	7	2	3	5	2
Senior totals			62	55	24	79	—

Preceded by Gert Blomé	Golden Puck; 1966	Succeeded by Bert-Ola Nordlander
