= Sven Tumba =

Swedish athlete (1931–2011)

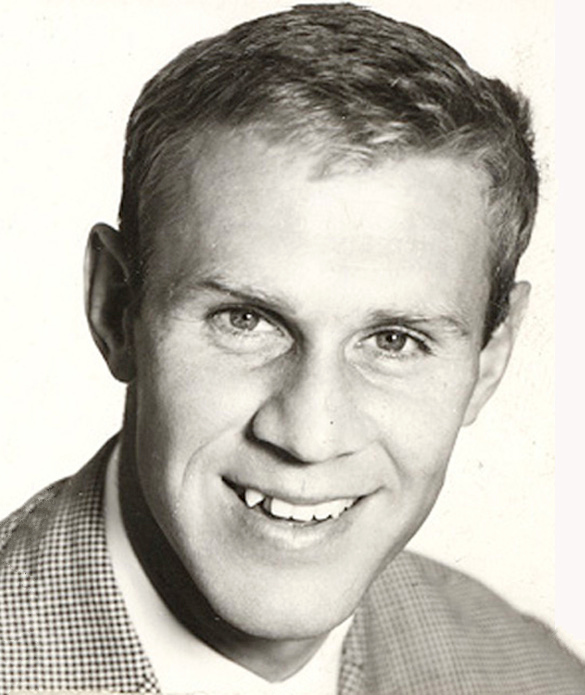
- Tumba c. 1960
- Born: Sven Olof Gunnar Johansson; 28 August 1931; Stockholm, Sweden
- Died: 1 October 2011 (aged 80); Stockholm, Sweden
- Height: 1.88 m (6 ft 2 in)
Ice hockey career
- Position: Centre
- Shot: Left
- Played for: Djurgårdens IF
- National team: Sweden
- Playing career: 1950–1966
Medal record
Representing Sweden
Ice hockey
Olympic Games
Bronze medal – third place	1952 Oslo	Team
Silver medal – second place	1964 Innsbruck	Team
World Championships
Gold medal – first place	1953 Zürich/Basel	Team
Bronze medal – third place	1954 Stockholm	Team
Gold medal – first place	1957 Moscow	Team
Bronze medal – third place	1958 Oslo	Team
Gold medal – first place	1962 Colorado Springs/Denver	Team
Silver medal – second place	1963 Stockholm	Team
Bronze medal – third place	1965 Tampere	Team
Association football career
- Position: Winger
Youth career
- Viggbyholms IK
Senior career*
Years	Team	Apps	(Gls)
–1949	Viggbyholms IK		
1949	Åmotfors IF		
1950	Viggbyholms IK		
1951–1961	Djurgårdens IF	86	(50)
International career
1953–1956	Sweden B	3	(5)
1956	Sweden	1	(0)
- * Club domestic league appearances and goals
- Website: www.sventumba.se www.sportforeducation.org

Sven Tumba (born Sven Olof Gunnar Johansson; 28 August 1931 – 1 October 2011) was one of the most prominent Swedish ice hockey players of the 1950s and 1960s. He also represented Sweden in football as well as golf and became Swedish champion in waterskiing.

Johansson first became known as "Tumba" in the 1950s because there were other players with the same last name and he had grown up in the Swedish town of Tumba. In October 1960 he married Mona, and five years later the couple legally changed their family name to Tumba.

Johansson was inducted into the IIHF Hall of Fame in 1997. After his retirement from ice hockey, he became a golfer, a golf course designer, a creator and organizer of golf exhibitions and tournaments, and an ambassador for the sport, officially introducing golf to the Soviet Union.

== Ice hockey ==
=== Playing career ===
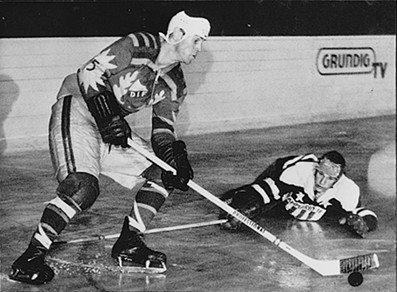
Tumba playing ice hockey in 1960.

Tumba debuted for Swedish club Djurgårdens IF in the 1950–51 Division I season. Tumba played for Djurgårdens IF until 1966, winning eight Swedish Championships. He was the league's top goal scorer in three seasons.

In 1957, Tumba was the first European player to attend an NHL training camp, with the Boston Bruins. He reportedly received a $50,000 contract offer from the Bruins after scoring a goal against the New York Rangers in a preseason exhibition game and making five appearances for the Rangers' Quebec Aces minor league team. However, Tumba turned down the offer, as he would no longer have been eligible to play amateur hockey for the Swedish national team.

In 1967–68, Tumba played one season with Malmö FF in the Swedish second division.

=== International play ===
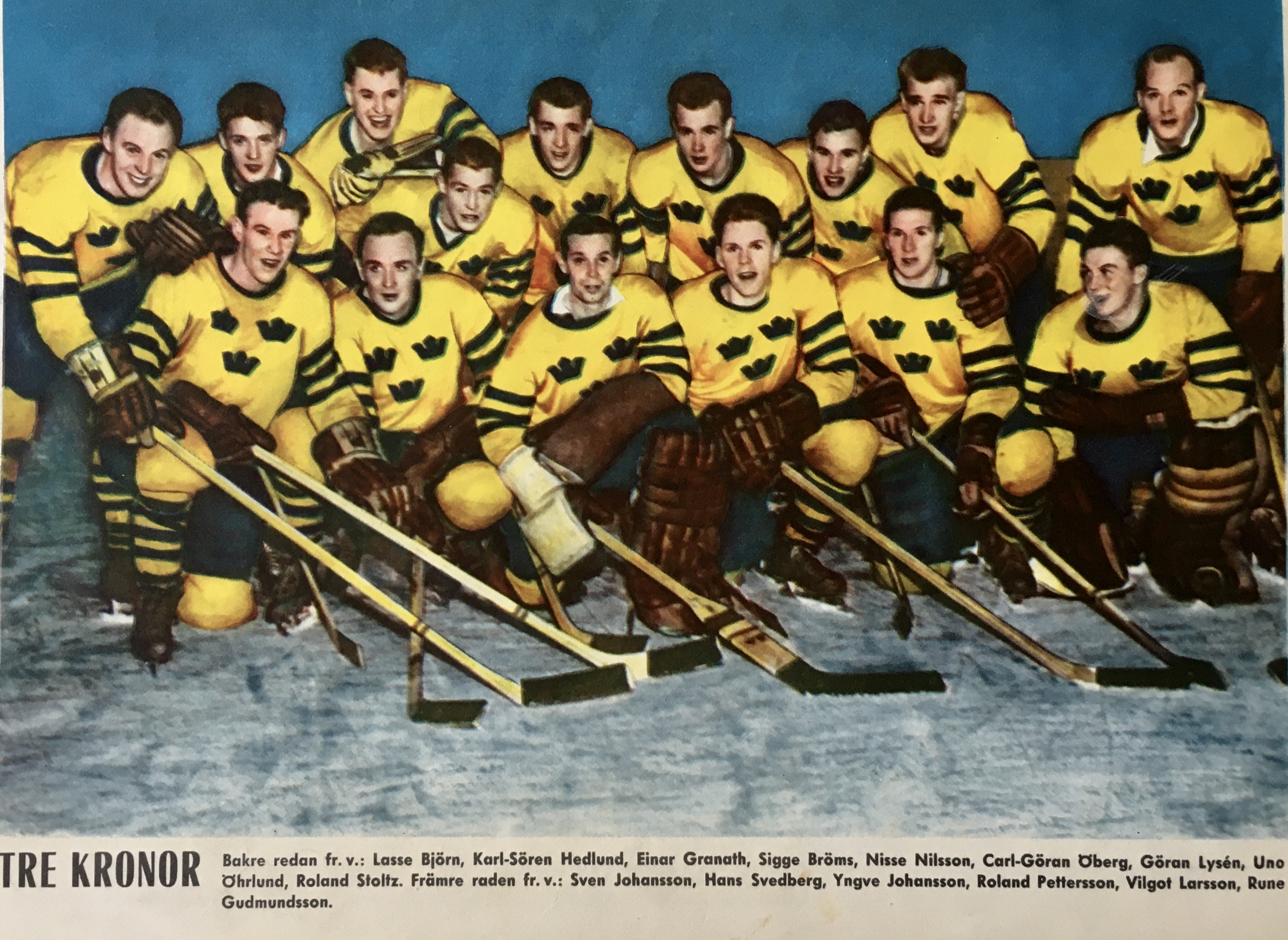
Tre Kronor in November 1958, from the left, standing: Lasse Björn, Karl-Sören Hedlund, Einar Granath, Sigurd Bröms, Nils Nilsson, Carl-Göran Öberg, Göran Lysén, Uno Öhrlund, Roland Stoltz; front row: Sven Tumba, Hans Svedberg, Yngve Johansson, Ronald Pettersson, Vilgot Larsson and Rune Gudmundsson.

Tumba had a lengthy international career, playing for Sweden at 14 IIHF World Championships and four Winter Olympics. He was named best forward at the 1957 and 1962 World Championships and was top scorer at the 1964 Winter Olympics. He also captained the national team.

As of 2010, Tumba holds the scoring record of 186 goals (in 245 games) for the Swedish national team.

=== Retirement ===
Djurgården has retired number 5 in his honor.

In 1997, he was inducted into the IIHF Hall of Fame and in 1999 he was voted the "Best Swedish Ice-hockey Player of All Times", ahead of players such as Peter Forsberg and Mats Sundin.

As a player:

- 1950–63: 8-time Swedish Champion (1954, 55, 58, 59, 60, 61, 62, 63)
- 1952: Olympic bronze, Oslo, Norway.
- 1953: World Champion, Zurich-Basel, Switzerland.
- 1954: World Championship Bronze, Stockholm, Sweden
- 1956: Olympic 5th place, Cortina, Italy.
- 1957: Test player for Boston Bruins. He was offered a contract, but turned it down, since he then would have become ineligible to play for the Swedish national team.
- 1957: World Champion, Moscow, USSR (also nominated best forward.)
- 1958: World Championship Bronze, Oslo, Norway.
- 1960: Olympic 5th place, Squaw Valley, USA.
- 1962: World Champion, Colorado Springs, USA (also nominated best forward.)
- 1963: World Championship Silver, Stockholm, Sweden
- 1964: Olympic Silver, Innsbruck, Austria.
- 1965: World Championship Bronze, Tampere, Rauma, Finland.
- 1989: Nominated the best Swedish ice hockey player throughout time.

Ice hockey projects:

- 1955: Inventor of the first hockey helmet, the SPAPS helmet.
- 1957: Founder of the Swedish ice hockey school on TV and the first ice hockey tournament for children, TV-pucken.

== Football ==
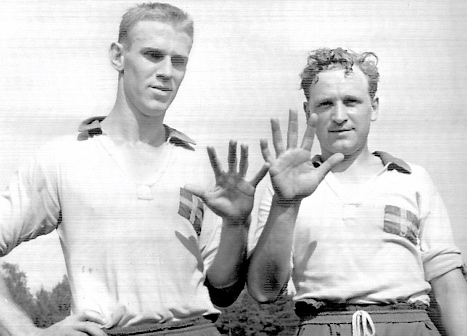
Tumba (left) and Henry Thillberg after having scored five goals each on Finland in a national B-team contest

In the mid-50s Tumba played for Djurgårdens IF. Tumba debuted for Djurgården in the 1950–51 Allsvenskan, playing two matches for the team that finished 6th. He was in the starting eleven for Djurgården's first European match, the first leg of the first round of the 1955–56 European Cup against Gwardia Warsaw. In 1959, he won the Swedish championship with Djurgården and became the team's top scorer with 11 goals.

He also represented the Sweden national football team, playing one game against Norway on 16 September 1956.

=== Honours ===
Djurgårdens IF:

- Allsvenskan: 1959

== Golf ==
After his career in ice hockey and football, Tumba dedicated himself to golf as a player, golf course designer and ambassador of the sport. Tumba is widely recognized as one of the most important figures in establishing golf as a widespread sport in Sweden.

Tumba was first introduced to golf when he was over the age of 30. He reached a scratch handicap in 1970, at 39 years of age. That year, representing Stockholm Golf Club, he won the Scandinavian International Amateur Match-play Championship (one of three major amateur tournaments in Scandinavia at the time) and was selected as one of the four players on the Swedish national team at the 1970 Eisenhower Trophy in Madrid, Spain.

He turned professional the following year and in 1974, he qualified, as one of the two best professionals in the country, to represent Sweden at the 1974 World Cup in Caracas, Venezuela.

In Swedish golf, however, he is remembered less for his record as a player than for his contributions to popularizing the game and raising Sweden's profile in international golf. He toured Sweden as the main attraction at inaugurations and anniversaries of golf clubs, giving his golf clinic, playing exhibition matches and drawing attention from the media and from people who had not previously known about the game.

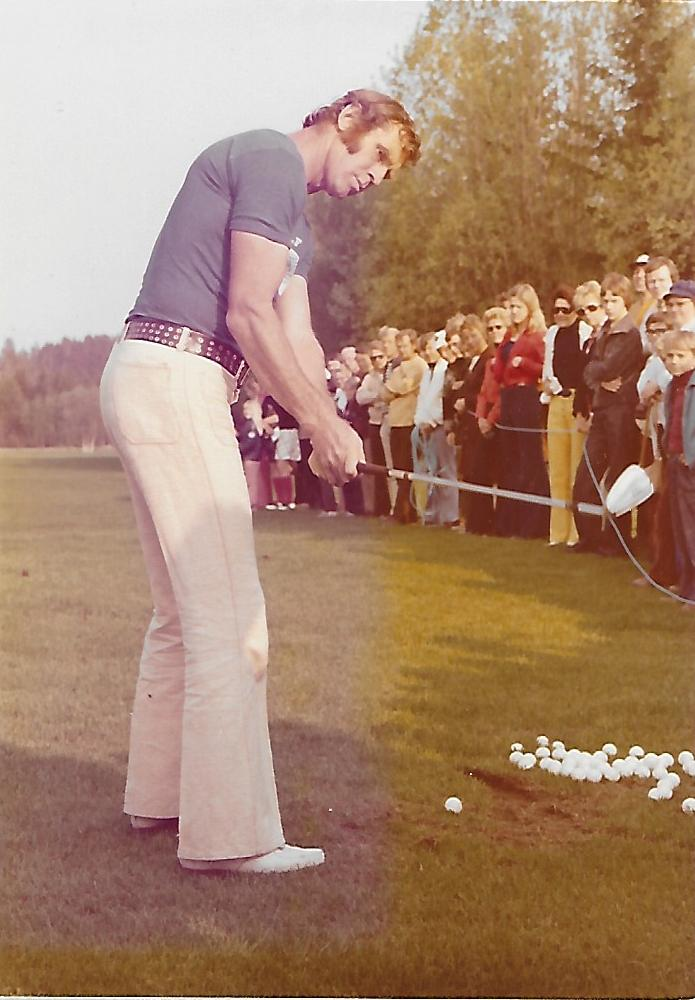
Sven Tumba during a golf exhibition at Hudiksvall Golf Club, Sweden, on 6 June 1972

The exhibitions he organized in Sweden with Arnold Palmer in 1968 and Jack Nicklaus in 1969 were followed by the professional invitation tournament Volvo Open, which took place in Sweden in 1970 and 1971. In 1973 the Scandinavian Enterprise Open tournament was established, with Tumba as its founder, and it soon became one of the richest tournaments on the European Tour.

During Tumba's golf career, the number of members of Swedish golf clubs increased 50 times, from around 12,000 at the beginning of the 1960s to approximately 600,000 in the middle of the 1990s.

Golf awards

In 1978, the Swedish Golf Federation awarded Tumba the Golden Club, its highest award for contributions to Swedish golf; he was its first recipient.

In 1985 he received The Merit Sign in Gold from the PGA of Sweden.

On the 100th anniversary of the Swedish Golf Federation in 2004, he was named the most influential person in the history of golf in that country, ahead of people such as Annika Sörenstam.

In 2006, Tumba was awarded the Erik Runfelt medal, at the time the highest award from the Swedish Golf Federation.

On 4 June 2022, Tumba became the seventh person to be inducted into the newly founded Swedish Golf Hall of Fame.

Golf projects

- 1967: Tumba Golf Center, the first indoor driving range in Sweden. Founder/Designer
- 1969: Founded the Colgate Cup, Sweden's major golf tournament for children up to 15 years of age
- 1973: Founder and President (for 15 years) of the Scandinavian Enterprise Open, one of the richest tournaments on the European Tour at the time
- 1977: Founder and President (for three years) of the European Open tournament on the European Tour.
- 1978: Ullna Golf Club, (venue of the Scandinavian Enterprise Open five times, 1983–87 and the 1988 Eisenhower Trophy). Golf course designer/Project Leader.
- 1987: Tumba Golf Club Moscow (now called Moscow City Club) the first golf course in the former Soviet Union, located in central Moscow close to the Swedish Embassy. Founder/Designer.
- 1988: Österåker Golf Club, two 18-hole courses (venue for the Ladies European Tour Compaq Open and Swedish Golf Tour tournaments)
- 1988: Officially introduced the game of golf in the former Soviet Union and founded the first golf school there.
- 1995: Founded the World Golfers Championship, a yearly amateur golf tournament in many countries, played by thousands of golfers around the world.
- 1998: Tumba Kävlinge Golf for All, Löddeköpinge. A new way of golf course design and management, with goal to benefit juniors and the general golf mass.
- 2004: Named as the most influential person in the history of golf in Sweden.

=== Amateur wins ===
- 1970 Scandinavian International Amateur Match-play Championship
- 1970 Söderhamn 72-hole Tournament

=== Team appearances ===
Amateur

- Eisenhower Trophy (representing Sweden): 1970

Professional

- World Cup (representing Sweden): 1974

== Miscellaneous ==
- 1957–61: Own radio program, the Tumba Hour.
- 1959: Held water ski shows all across Sweden.
- 1981: Founded the Tumba Stipendium (grant) for handicapped sportsmen, that amongst other things gave Lev Yashin a hip joint replacement in Sweden.
- 1987: Founder of the motto "Sport Promotes Friendship and Business", supported by eminent sportsmen, politicians, artists, etc. Examples are Pelé, Sean Connery, Seve Ballesteros and Boris Yeltsin.
- 1989: Received the Royal Medal from HM King Carl Gustaf for his outstanding sport achievements.
- 2006: Founded the Sven Tumba Education Fund, Sport for Education, a charity together with AstraZeneca aiming to eradicate illiteracy.

== Personal life ==
Tumba was the son of engineer Torsten Johansson and his German-born wife Greta, née Kruse. He was survived by his wife Mona (née Nessim, b. 1941) and their four sons, Tommie, born 1962, Johan, born 1964, Stefan, born 1970 and Daniel, born 1982. Both Tommie and Johan became golf professionals. Johan played on the European Tour, finishing tied 13th in the 1989 Scandinavian Enterprise Open, and later became a professional long driving competitor.

For most of his retirement, Tumba and his wife lived in West Palm Beach, Florida, returning to Sweden in summers.

Tumba's great-niece is footballer Amanda Ilestedt.

== Death ==
He died on 1 October 2011 after spending three months at Danderyd Hospital with an infection in the hip. At the time of his death, he was both a Swedish and an American citizen, but was not registered as living in Sweden. He had intended to register as a resident before his death, but quickly became too weak to complete the necessary formalities. He was honored with a one-minute silence before the Swedish hockey league Elitserien games that were played that day. His body was buried at the Engelbrekt Church in Östermalm, Stockholm, on 20 October 2011. Approximately 500 friends and relatives came to the church to leave flowers and honour Tumba.

== Bibliography ==
Tumba wrote numerous books: Tumba säger allt! (Tumba Says It All!), Tumbas ishockeyskola (Tumba's Ice Hockey School) (translated into three languages), as well as Mitt rika liv eller Den nakna sanningen (My Rich Life or the Naked Truth).
