= Anders Andersson (ice hockey) =

Swedish ice hockey player

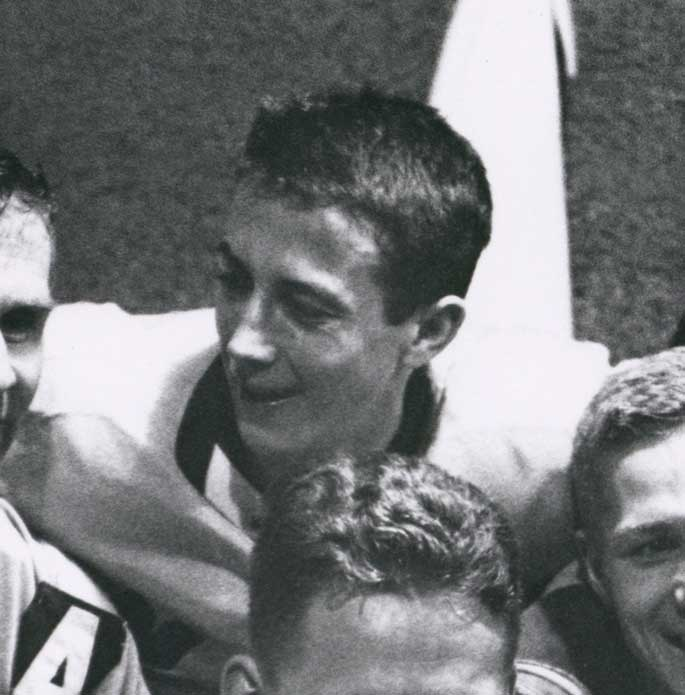
- Anders Andersson in the mid 1960's
- Born: 2 January 1937 Skellefteå, Sweden
- Died: 15 December 1989 (aged 52) Skellefteå, Sweden
- Height: 5 ft 10 in (178 cm)
- Weight: 159 lb (72 kg; 11 st 5 lb)
- Position: Forward
- Shot: Left
- Played for: Skellefteå AIK; Färjestad BK
- National team: Sweden
- Playing career: 1955–1969
Medal record
Representing Sweden
Olympic Games
Silver medal – second place	1964 Innsbruck	Team
World Championships
Gold medal – first place	1957 Moscow	Team
Gold medal – first place	1962 Colorado Springs/Denver	Team
Bronze medal – third place	1965 Tampere	Team

Åke Anders "Akka" Andersson (2 January 1937 – 15 December 1989) was a Swedish ice hockey centre in the 1950s and 1960s. He played 132 international games for Sweden, including seven IIHF World Championships and two Winter Olympics, in 1960 and 1964. Andersson played on the famous "Mosquito Line" with Eilert Määttä and Kalle Hedlund.

In Sweden, Andersson played for Skellefteå AIK from 1956 to 1966 and Färjestads BK from 1966 to 1969. He is one of only three players to win the Golden Puck as Swedish Player of the Year twice, which he did in 1961 and 1962, and was appointed into the Swedish Hockey Hall of Fame in August 2012.

He has also been inducted into the Skellefteå AIK Wall of Fame.

Preceded by Ronald Pettersson	Guldpucken; 1961, 1962	Succeeded by Ulf Sterner
