= Carl-Göran Öberg =

Swedish ice hockey player

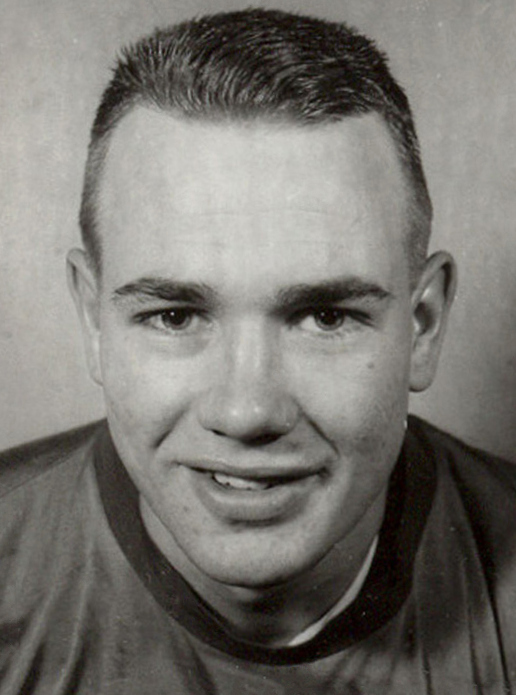
- Born: 24 December 1938 (age 87) Valbo, Sweden
- Height: 5 ft 11 in (180 cm)
- Weight: 181 lb (82 kg; 12 st 13 lb)
- Position: Left wing
- Shot: Left
- Played for: Gävle Godtemplares IK (1955–1960); Djurgårdens IF (1960–1968); Tranås AIF (1968–1970); Södertälje SK (1970–1973)
- National team: Sweden
- Playing career: 1955–1973
Medal record
Representing Sweden
Olympic Games
Silver medal – second place	1964 Innsbruck	Team
World Championships
Bronze medal – third place	1958 Oslo	Team
Silver medal – second place	1963 Stockholm	Team
Bronze medal – third place	1965 Tampere	Team
Silver medal – second place	1967 Vienna	Team

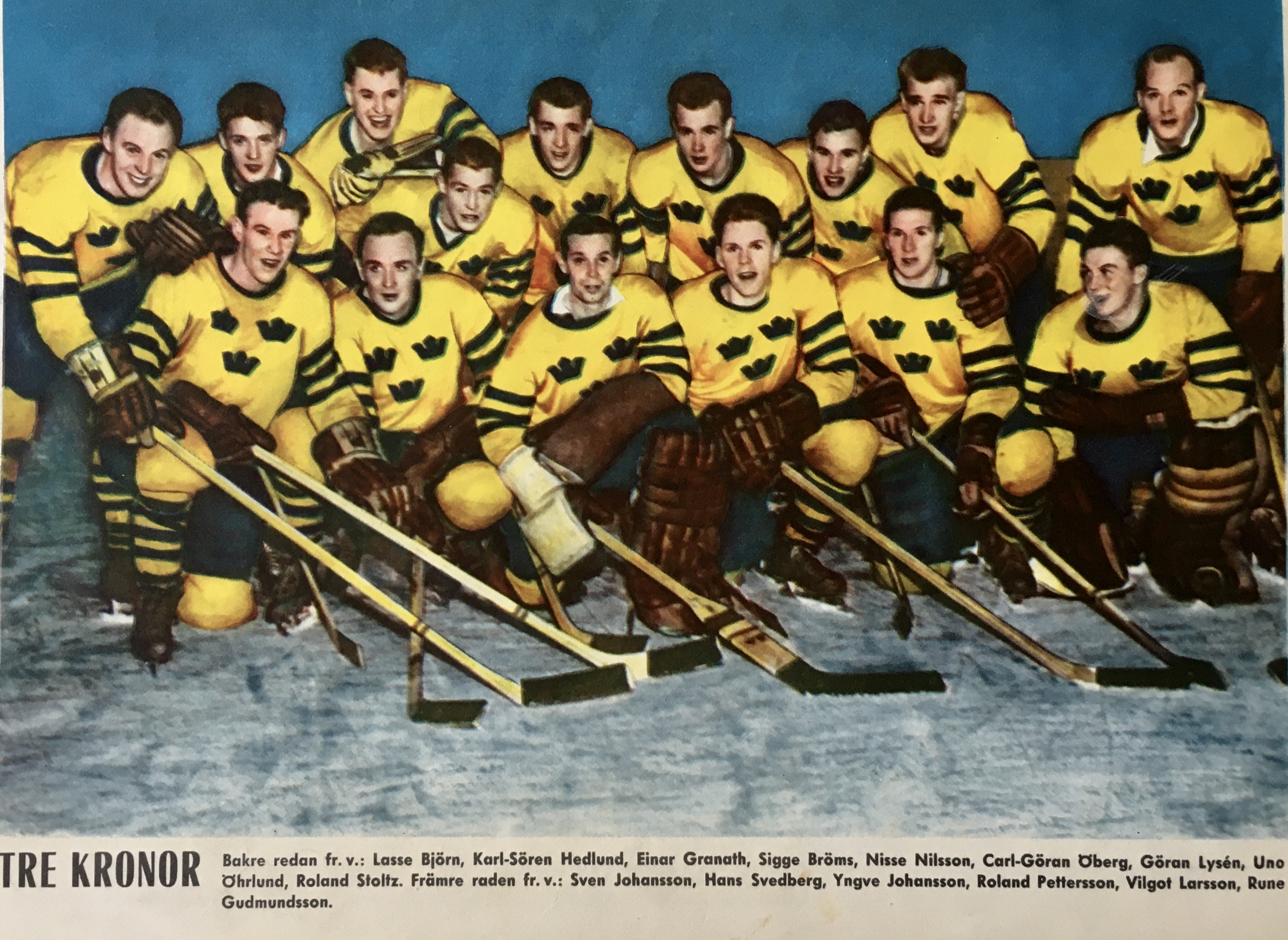
Tre Kronor in November 1958, from the left, standing: Lasse Björn, Karl-Sören "Kalle" Hedlund, Einar Granath, Sigge Bröms, Nils "Dubbel-Nisse" Nilsson, Carl-Göran "Lill-Stöveln" Öberg, Göran Lysén, Uno "Garvis" Öhrlund, Roland "Rolle" Stoltz; front row: Sven "Tumba" Johansson, Hasse Svedberg, Yngve Johansson, Roland "Sura-Pelle" Pettersson, Vilgot "Ville" Larsson and Rune Gudmundsson.

Carl-Göran "Lill-Stöveln" Öberg (born 24 December 1938) is a retired ice hockey player who won silver medals at the 1964 Winter Olympics and 1963 and 1967 world championships. He was nicknamed Lill-Stöveln (Little Stöveln) after his elder brother, the Olympic ice hockey player Hans "Stöveln" Öberg.

Öberg won the national title in 1957 with Gävle Godtemplares IK and in 1961–63 with Djurgårdens IF. In 1963 he was selected to the Swedish all-star team.

During a game versus Canada in ice hockey at the 1964 Winter Olympics, Öberg broke his stick and tossed it aside. The broken end of the stick went towards the Canadian players' bench, where it struck their coach Father David Bauer in the face and opened a bleeding wound. Bauer demanded for his players to remain on the bench and not retaliate. Bauer forgave Öberg and extended an invitation to sit together at the game between the Soviet Union and Czechoslovakia.

Öberg played bandy with Djurgårdens IF Bandy 1961–62.
