= Uno Öhrlund =

Swedish ice hockey player

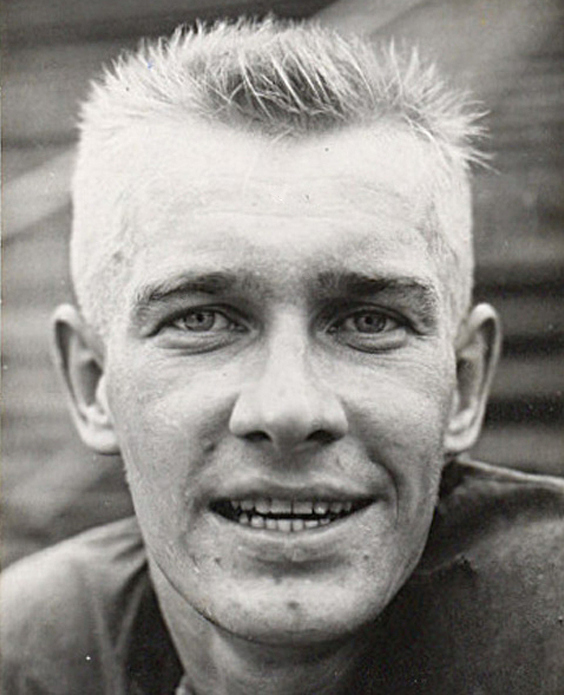

Personal information
- Born: 22 May 1937 (age 89) Gävle, Sweden
- Height: 187 cm (6 ft 2 in)
- Weight: 87 kg (192 lb)

Sport
- Sport: Ice hockey
- Club: Västerås IK (1954–67); Tingsryds AIF (1967–68); Surahammars IF (1970–72); IFK Arboga (1972–73); Skogsbo SK (1973–74); Morgårdshammars IF (1974–75)
Medal record
Representing Sweden
Olympic Games
Silver medal – second place	1964 Innsbruck	Team
World Championships
Gold medal – first place	1962 Colorado Springs/Denver	Team
Silver medal – second place	1963 Stockholm	Team
Bronze medal – third place	1965 Tampere	Team

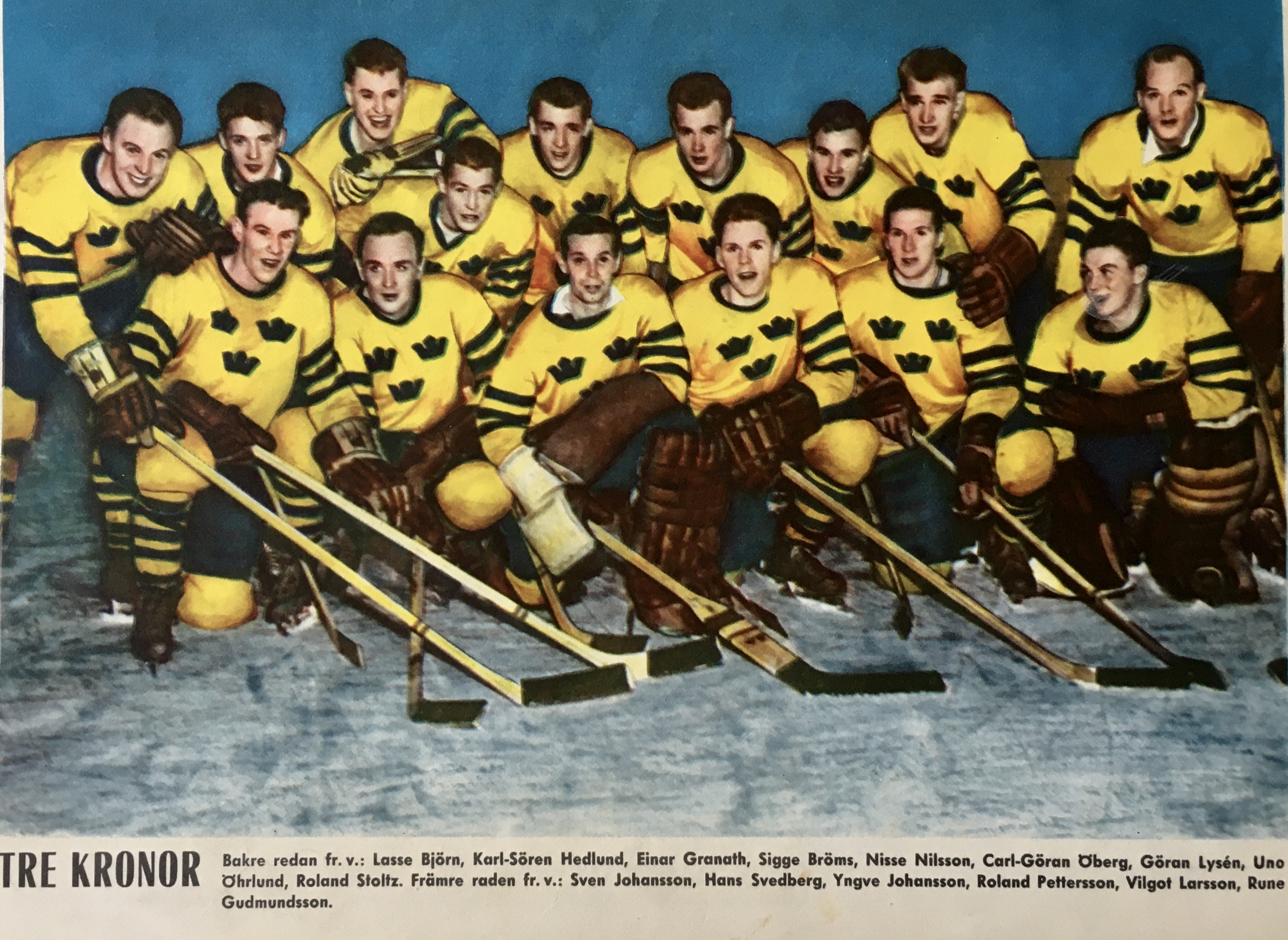
Tre Kronor in November 1958, from the left, standing: Lasse Björn, Karl-Sören "Kalle" Hedlund, Einar Granath, Sigge Bröms, Nils "Double-Nisse" Nilsson, Carl-Göran "Lill-Stöveln" Öberg, Göran Lysén, Uno "Garvis" Öhrlund, Roland "Rolle" Stoltz; front row: Sven "Tumba" Johansson, Hasse Svedberg, Yngve Johansson, Roland "Sura-Pelle" Pettersson, Vilgot "Ville" Larsson and Rune Gudmundsson.

Uno Öhrlund (born 22 May 1937) is a Swedish retired ice hockey player who won a silver medal at the 1964 Winter Olympics. Between 1957 and 1965 he played 85 times with the Sweden national team and scored 57 goals. He won a world title in 1962, finishing second in 1963 and third in 1965.

Öhrlund never won a Swedish title, but was selected to the Swedish all-star team in 1964. He also played association football with Västerås and bandy with Svartådalens SK at the Swedish championships.
