= Roland Stoltz (ice hockey, born 1931) =

Swedish ice hockey player

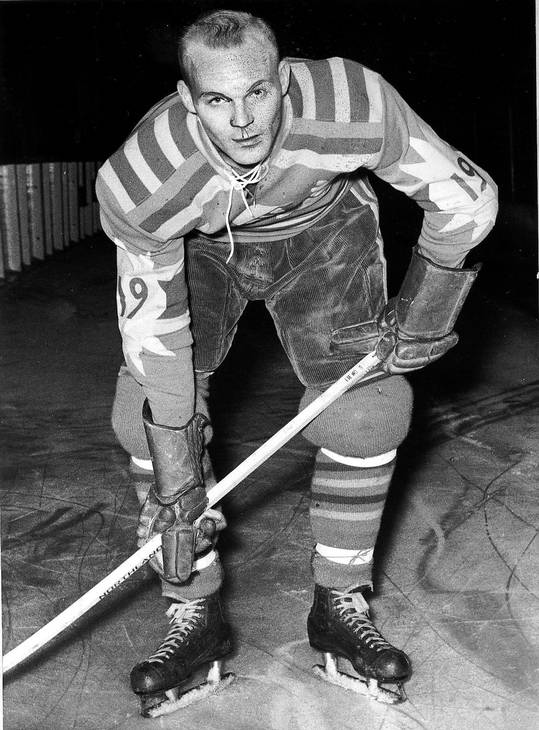
- Roland Stolz in 1965.
- Born: 1 August 1931 Stockholm, Sweden
- Died: 19 February 2001 (aged 69) Stockholm, Sweden
- Height: 6 ft 2 in (188 cm)
- Weight: 187 lb (85 kg; 13 st 5 lb)
- Position: Defence
- Shot: Right
- Played for: Atlas Diesels IF; Djurgårdens IF
- National team: Sweden
- Playing career: 1955–1970
Medal record
Representing Sweden
Olympic Games
Silver medal – second place	1964 Innsbruck	Team competition
World Championships
Gold medal – first place	1957 Soviet Union	Team
Bronze medal – third place	1958 Norway	Team
Gold medal – first place	1962 United States	Team
Silver medal – second place	1963 Sweden	Team
Bronze medal – third place	1965 Finland	Team
Silver medal – second place	1967 Austria	Team

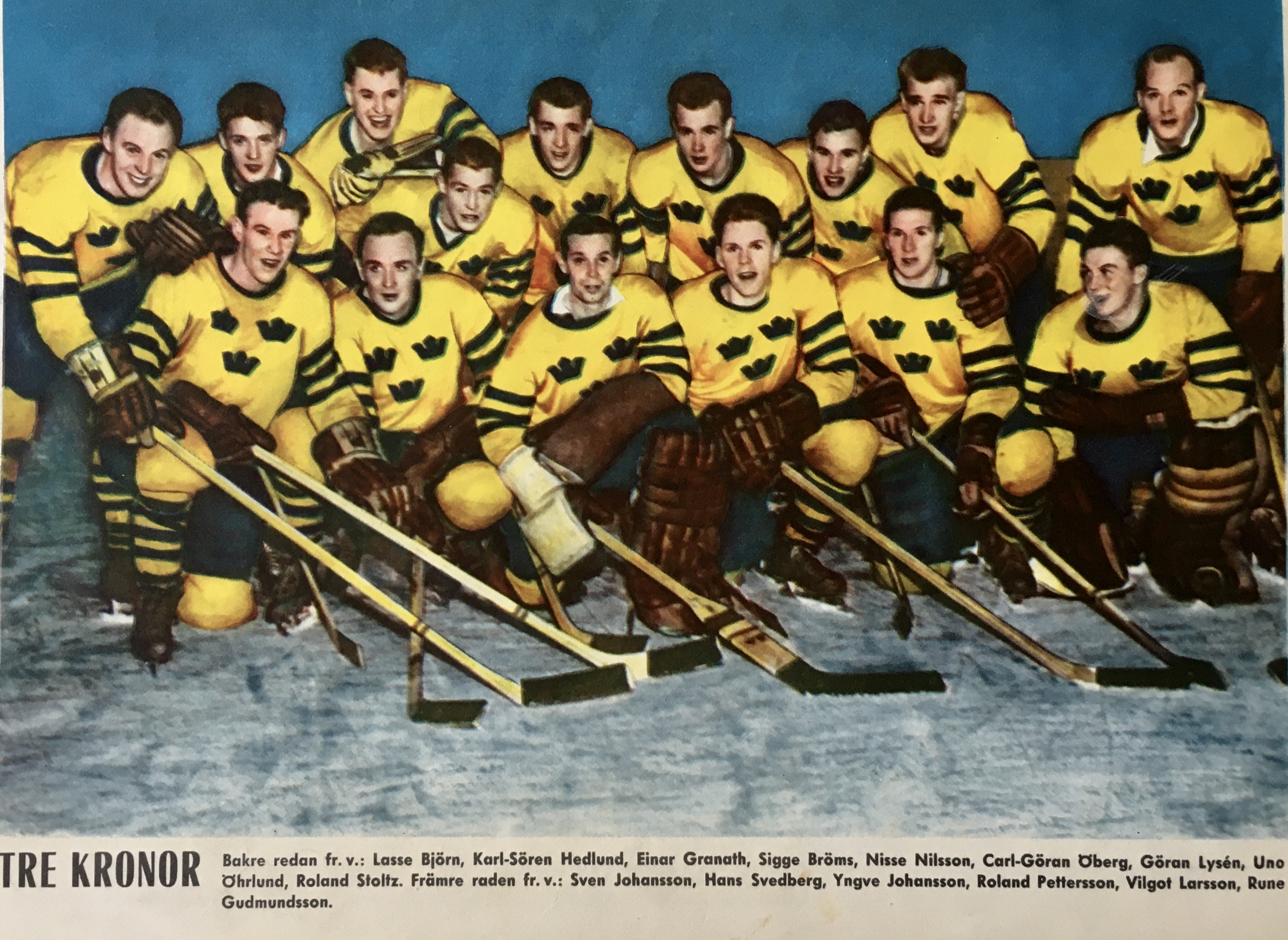
Team Sweden in November 1958, from the left, standing: Lasse Björn, Karl-Sören Hedlund, Einar Granath, Sigurd Bröms, Nils Nilsson, Carl-Göran Öberg, Göran Lysén, Uno Öhrlund, Roland Stoltz; front row: Sven Tumba, Hans Svedberg, Yngve Johansson, Ronald Pettersson, Vilgot Larsson and Rune Gudmundsson.

Frank Roland "Rolle" Stoltz (1 August 1931 – 19 February 2001) was a Swedish ice hockey defenceman. He competed in the 1960, 1964 and 1968 Olympics and finished in fifth, second and fourth place, respectively. At the world championships he won two gold, two silver and two bronze medals between 1957 and 1967, and was named the best defenseman in 1963. Stoltz also won European titles in 1957 and 1962, and was selected to the Swedish all-star team in 1959, 1960, 1963, 1964 and 1966. In 1999 he was inducted into the IIHF Hall of Fame.

Stoltz was a mechanic with Atlas Copco, a Swedish mining machinery company. After retiring from competitions he worked as an ice hockey commentator on the Swedish national television.

== Career ==
Stoltz started his career in Gröndals IK. From 1948 to 1955, Roland Stoltz played with Atlas Diesel IF in the Swedish Division 1 and Division 2. In 1955, he joined Djurgårdens IF in the top-flight Division and played for them until 1970, winning six Swedish championships in a row 1958–1963.

Djurgården has retired number 2 in his honor.

Preceded by Hans Svedberg	Golden Puck; 1959	Succeeded by Ronald Pettersson
