= Karl-Sören Hedlund =

Swedish ice hockey player (1938–2021)

Medal record

Representing Sweden

Men's ice hockey

World Championships
| Bronze medal – third place | 1958 Norway | |

Karl-Sören "Kalle" Hedlund (January 28, 1938 – September 26, 2021) was a Swedish ice hockey forward. He was known for being a member of the "Mosquito Line" on Skellefteå AIK together with Anders Andersson and Eilert Määttä. While both Andersson and Määttä won World Championships gold, Kalle's highest accolade was a bronze medal in 1958.

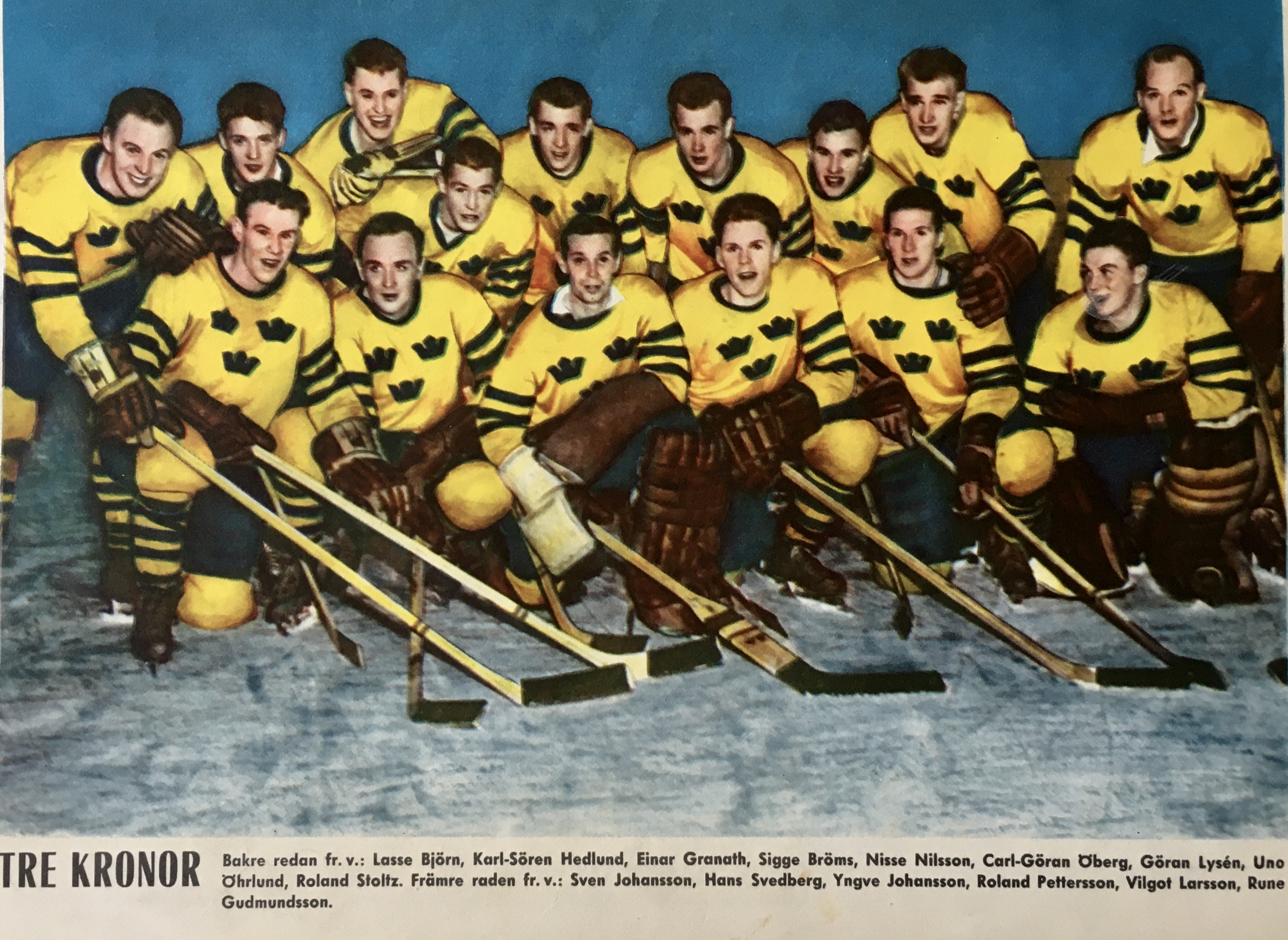
Team Sweden in November 1958, from the left, standing: Lasse Björn, Karl-Sören "Kalle" Hedlund, Einar Granath, Sigge Bröms, Nils "Double-Nisse" Nilsson, Carl-Göran "Lill-Stöveln" Öberg, Göran Lysén, Uno "Garvis" Öhrlund, Roland "Rolle" Stoltz; front row: Sven "Tumba" Johansson, Hasse Svedberg, Yngve Johansson, Roland "Sura-Pelle" Pettersson, Vilgot "Ville" Larsson and Rune Gudmundsson.
