= Hans Svedberg =

Swedish ice hockey player

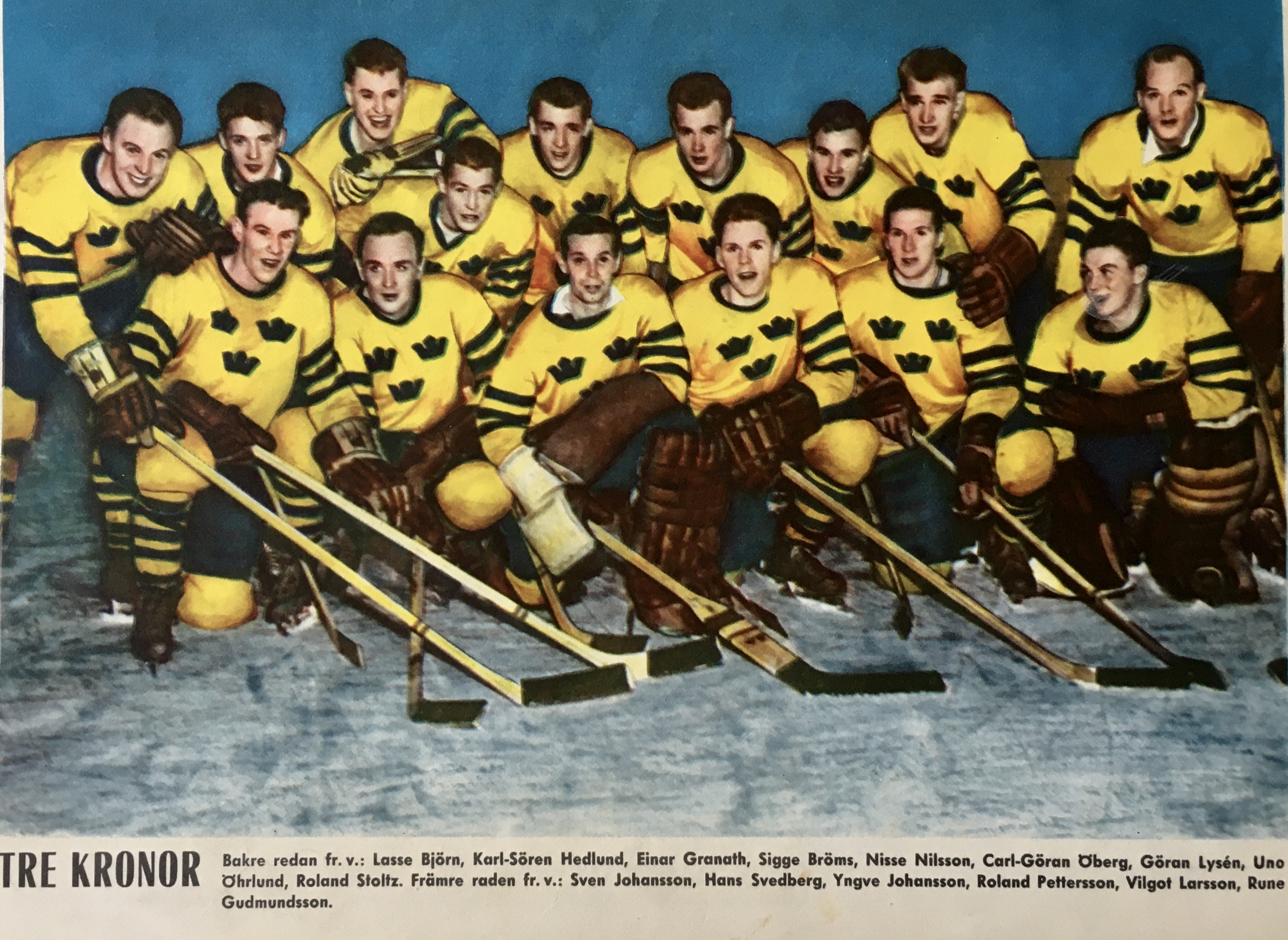
- Tre Kronor in November 1958, from the left, standing: Lasse Björn, Karl-Sören "Kalle" Hedlund, Einar Granath, Sigge Bröms, Nils "Double-Nisse" Nilsson, Carl-Göran "Lill-Stöveln" Öberg, Göran Lysén, Uno "Garvis" Öhrlund, Roland "Rolle" Stoltz; front row: Sven "Tumba" Johansson, Hasse Svedberg, Yngve Johansson, Roland "Sura-Pelle" Pettersson, Vilgot "Ville" Larsson and Rune Gudmundsson.

Personal information
- Born: 6 September 1931 Piteå, Sweden
- Died: 27 July 2012 (aged 80)

Sport
- Sport: ice hockey
- Position: defenceman
Medal record
World Championships
Gold medal – first place	1957	ice hockey
Bronze medal – third place	1958	ice hockey

Hans Ingemar Svedberg (6 September 1931 – 27 July 2012) was a Swedish ice hockey defenceman. For his extraordinary 1957–58 season where he scored eight goals and two assists in 14 games, Svedberg was awarded Guldpucken as ice hockey player of the year.

== International play ==
- World Championships gold: 1957
- World Championships bronze: 1958
- 1960 Winter Olympics: fifth place

Preceded by Hans Öberg	Golden Puck; 1958	Succeeded by Roland Stoltz
