= Eilert Määttä =

Swedish ice hockey player and coach

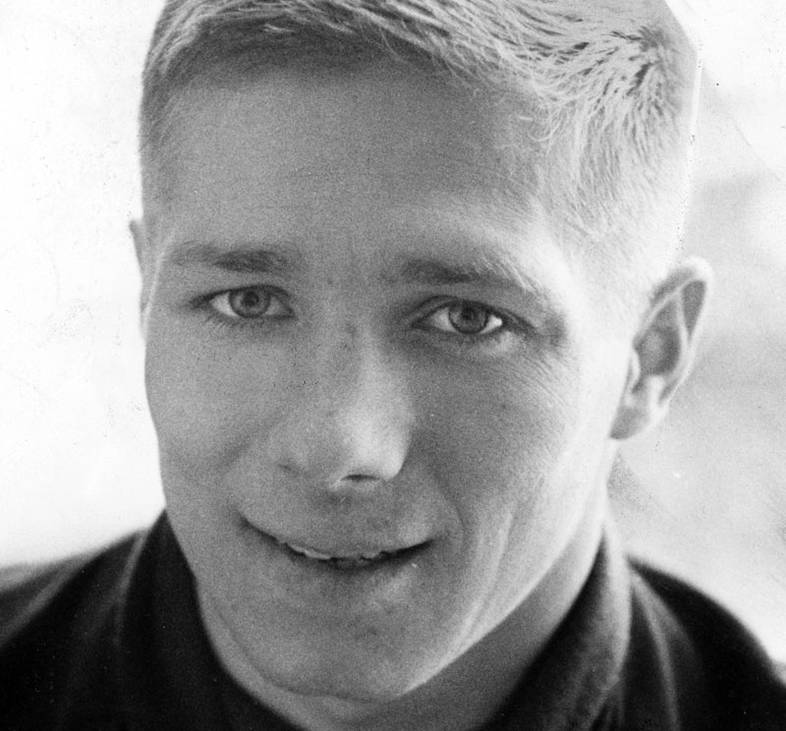
- Eilert Määttä during the early-1960s
- Born: 22 September 1935 Vittangi, Sweden
- Died: 7 May 2011 (aged 75) Södertälje, Sweden
- Position: Forward
- Shot: Right
- Played for: Skellefteå AIK; Södertälje SK
- Playing career: 1956–1974
Medal record
Representing Sweden
Olympic Games
Silver medal – second place	1964 Innsbruck	Team
World Championships
Gold medal – first place	1957 Moscow	Team
Gold medal – first place	1962 Colorado Springs/Denver	Team
Silver medal – second place	1963 Stockholm	Team
Bronze medal – third place	1965 Tampere	Team
Silver medal – second place	1967 Vienna	Team

Yngve Eilert "Garvis" Määttä (22 September 1935 – 7 May 2011) was a Swedish professional ice hockey player and coach. He played for Skellefteå AIK and Södertälje SK. In international play he scored the game tying 4–4 goal in the 1957 World Ice Hockey Championships in the final game against the Soviet Union that clinched the tournament win for Sweden.

Määttä was the coach for Huddinge IK in division 1 during the 1974–75 and 1975–76 seasons, and for Djurgårdens IF during the 1978–79 Elitserien season.
