= Yngve Johansson (ice hockey) =

Swedish ice hockey player (1929–2002)

- Born: 21 January 1929 Stockholm, Sweden
- Died: 2002 (aged 72–73)
- Position: Goaltender
- Played for: Djurgården
- National team: Sweden
- Playing career: 1947–1962

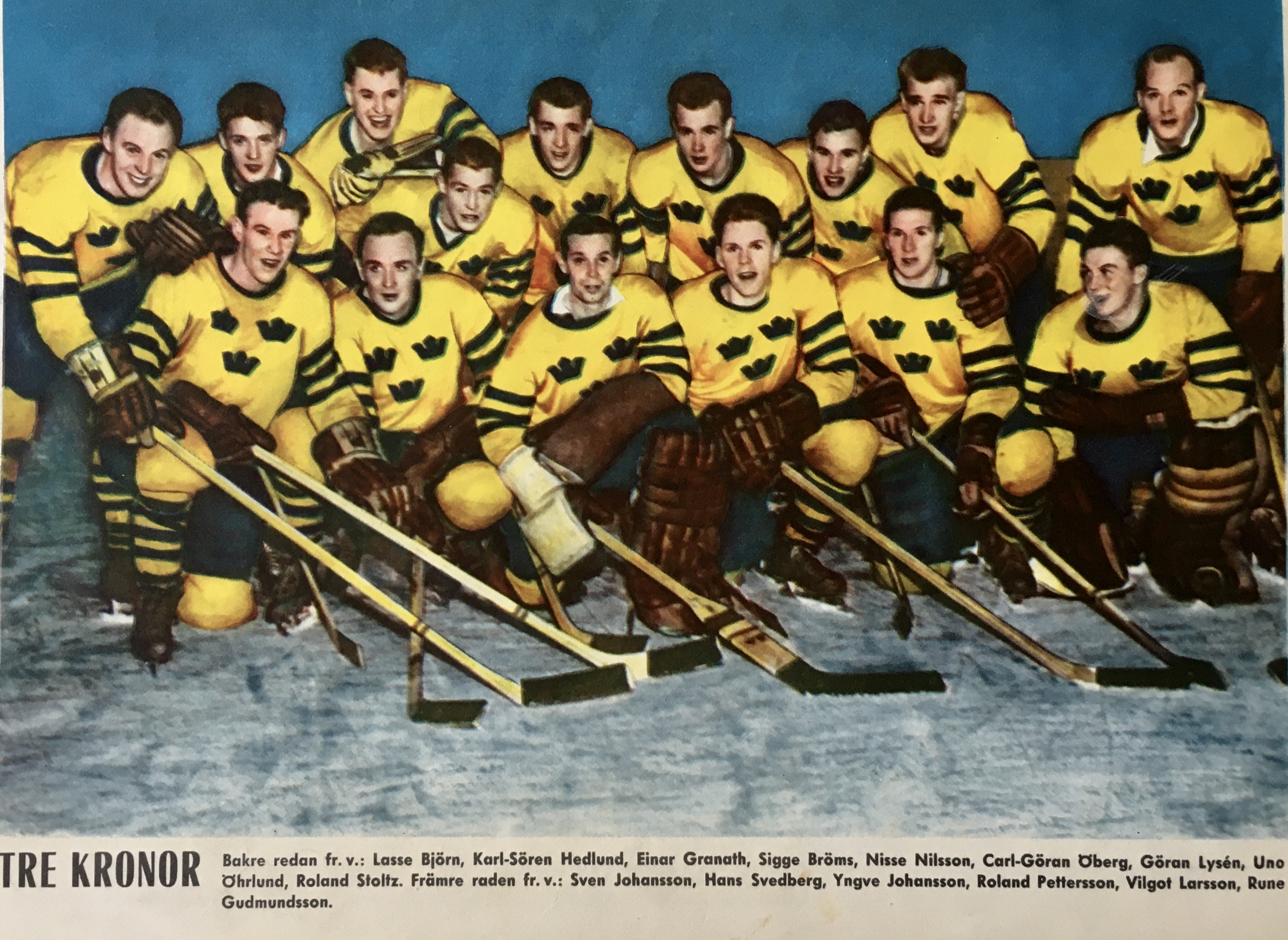
Tre Kronor in November 1958, from the left, standing: Lasse Björn, Karl-Sören "Kalle" Hedlund, Einar Granath, Sigge Bröms, Nils "Double-Nisse" Nilsson, Carl-Göran "Lill-Stöveln" Öberg, Göran Lysén, Uno "Garvis" Öhrlund, Roland "Rolle" Stoltz; front row: Sven "Tumba" Johansson, Hasse Svedberg, Yngve Johansson, Roland "Sura-Pelle" Pettersson, Vilgot "Ville" Larsson and Rune Gudmundsson.

Yngve Johansson (21 January 1929 – 2002) was a Swedish ice hockey player. He was part of the Djurgården Swedish champions' team of 1954, 1955, 1958, 1959, 1959, and 1962.

He played two World Championship tournaments for Team Sweden, in 1955 and 1959, with Sweden placing 5th both times.
