= Sigurd Bröms =

Swedish ice hockey player

- Born: 1 October 1932 Leksand, Sweden
- Died: 13 January 2007 (aged 74) Sollerön, Sweden
- Position: Centre
- Shot: Right
- Played for: Leksands IF
- National team: Sweden
- Playing career: 1948–1967

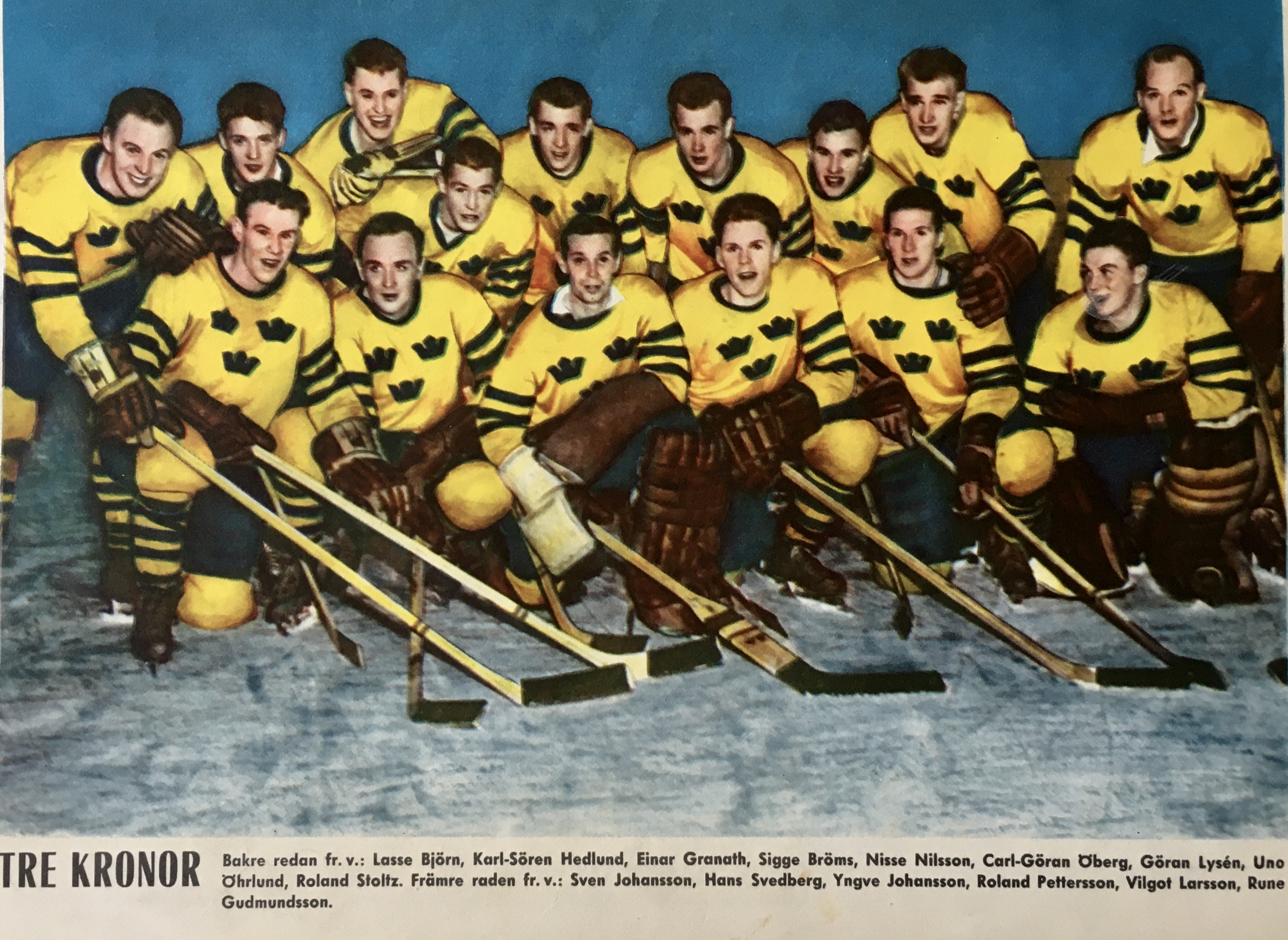
Tre Kronor in November 1958, from the left, standing: Lasse Björn, Karl-Sören Hedlund, Einar Granath, Sigge Bröms, Nils "Double-Nisse" Nilsson, Carl-Göran "Lill-Stöveln" Öberg, Göran Lysén, Uno "Garvis" Öhrlund, Roland "Rolle" Stoltz; front row: Sven "Tumba" Johansson, Hasse Svedberg, Yngve Johansson, Roland "Sura-Pelle" Pettersson, Vilgot "Ville" Larsson and Rune Gudmundsson.

Sigurd Erik "Sigge" Bröms (1 October 1932 – 13 January 2007) was a Swedish ice hockey center and Olympian.

Bröms played with Team Sweden at the 1956 Winter Olympics held in Cortina d'Ampezzo, Italy. He also played for Leksands IF in the Swedish Elite League.
