= Einar Granath =

Swedish ice hockey player (1936–1993)

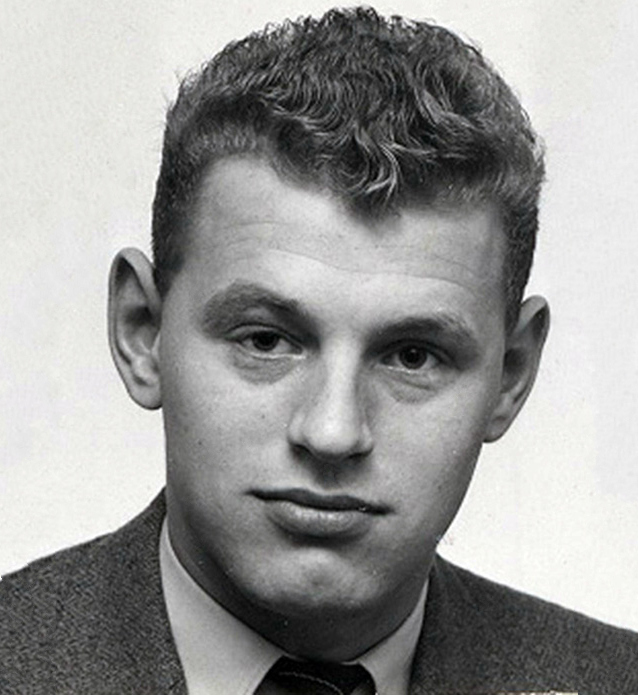

Personal information
- Born: 28 October 1936 Mora, Sweden
- Died: 5 January 1993 (aged 56) Stockholm, Sweden

Sport
- Sport: Ice hockey
- Club: Södertälje SK

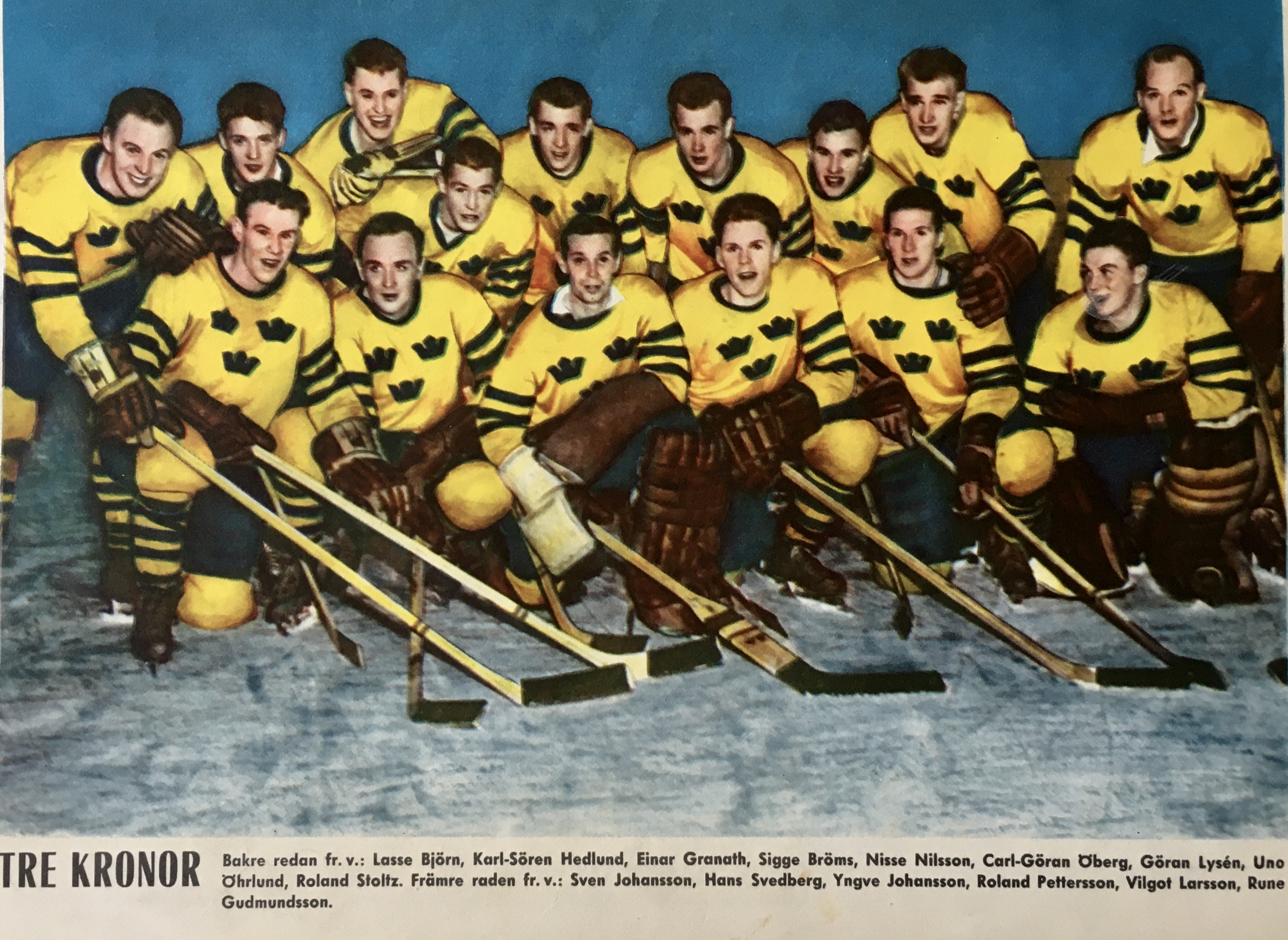
Tre Kronor in November 1958, from the left, standing: Lasse Björn, Karl-Sören Hedlund, Einar Granath, Sigge Bröms, Nils "Double-Nisse" Nilsson, Carl-Göran "Lill-Stöveln" Öberg, Göran Lysén, Uno "Garvis" Öhrlund, Roland "Rolle" Stoltz; front row: Sven "Tumba" Johansson, Hasse Svedberg, Yngve Johansson, Roland "Sura-Pelle" Pettersson, Vilgot "Ville" Larsson and Rune Gudmundsson.

Hans Einar Granath (28 October 1936 – 5 January 1993) was a Swedish ice hockey player. He was part of the Swedish team that finished fifth at the 1960 Winter Olympics. He served as the Swedish Olympic flag bearer at those Games.
