= Hal Jones =

Hal Jones may refer to:

- Hal Jones (baseball) (born 1936), Major League Baseball first baseman
- Hal Jones (ice hockey) (born 1933), Canadian ice hockey player
- Harold Jones (rugby, born 1907) (1907–1955), Welsh rugby union and rugby league footballer, known as Hal
- Hal Jones (1890–1976), featured theatrical performer in the British post-First World War revue Splinters
