= Harry Smith (ice hockey, born 1935) =

Canadian ice hockey player (1935–2020)

- Born: May 30, 1935 Trail, British Columbia, Canada
- Died: July 20, 2020 (aged 85) Duncan, British Columbia, Canada
- Height: 6 ft 0 in (183 cm)
- Weight: 200 lb (91 kg; 14 st 4 lb)
- Position: Defence
- Played for: WHL; Seattle Americans; Spokane Spokes; Spokane Comets; Vancouver Canucks; Portland Buckaroos; WIHL; Trail Smoke Eaters
- National team: Canada
- Playing career: 1956–1969
Medal record
World Championships
Gold medal – first place	1961 Switzerland
Silver medal – second place	1962 USA

Henry Newton "Harry" Smith (May 30, 1935 – July 20, 2020) was a Canadian professional ice hockey defenceman.

Smith represented Canada at the 1961, 1962, and 1963 World Ice Hockey Championships, winning a gold medal in 1961 and silver (and being named an all-star defenceman) in 1962.

Smith died on July 20, 2020, aged 85.

== International statistics ==
Year	Team	Event	GP	G	A	Pts	PIM
1961	Canada	WC	7	2	3	5	6
1962	Canada	WC	7	5	7	12	10
1963	Canada	WC	7	2	1	3	6
Senior totals			21	9	11	20	22
