= Vilgot Larsson =

Swedish ice hockey player

- Born: 3 May 1932 Falun, Sweden
- Died: 21 December 2015 (aged 83)
- Position: Defence
- Shot: Left
- Played for: Leksands IF
- National team: Sweden
- Playing career: 1946–1968

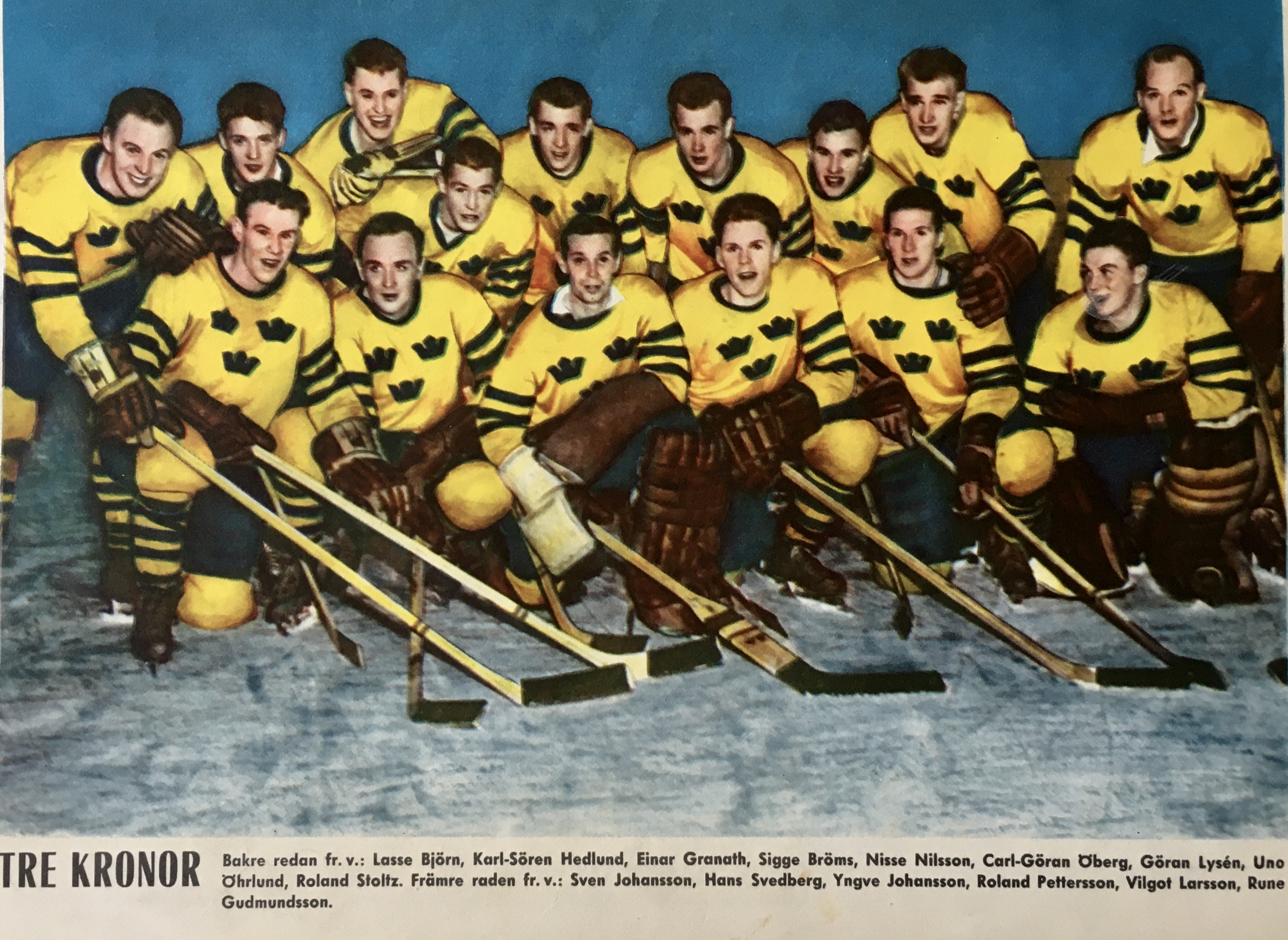
Tre Kronor in November 1958, from the left, standing: Lasse Björn, Karl-Sören "Kalle" Hedlund, Einar Granath, Sigge Bröms, Nils "Double-Nisse" Nilsson, Carl-Göran "Lill-Stöveln" Öberg, Göran Lysén, Uno "Garvis" Öhrlund, Roland "Rolle" Stoltz; front row: Sven "Tumba" Johansson, Hasse Svedberg, Yngve Johansson, Roland "Sura-Pelle" Pettersson, Vilgot "Ville" Larsson and Rune Gudmundsson.

Vilgot Bengt "Ville" Larsson (3 May 1932 – 21 December 2015) was a Swedish ice hockey defenceman and Olympian.

Larsson played with Team Sweden at the 1956 Winter Olympics held in Cortina d'Ampezzo, Italy. He also played for Leksands IF. He died in 2015, aged 83.
