= Hal Jones (ice hockey) =

Canadian ice hockey player (1933–2022)

- Born: July 22, 1933 Trail, British Columbia, Canada
- Died: October 20, 2022 (aged 89) Surrey, British Columbia, Canada
- Height: 5 ft 11 in (180 cm)
- Weight: 175 lb (79 kg; 12 st 7 lb)
- Position: Centre
- Shot: Right
- Played for: Trail Smoke Eaters
- National team: Canada
- Playing career: 1951–1965
Medal record
Men's ice hockey
Gold medal – first place	1961 Switzerland	Ice hockey

Harold Gordon Jones (July 22, 1933 – October 20, 2022), was a Canadian ice hockey player with the Trail Smoke Eaters. He represented Canada twice in the Ice Hockey World Championships and won a gold medal at the 1961 World Ice Hockey Championships in Switzerland. He also played in the 1963 World Ice Hockey Championships in Sweden, where he led the 1963 tournament in scoring with 12 points. During his playing career he also played with the Lethbridge Native Sons, Marion Barons, Cleveland Barons, Toledo Mercurys, Rossland Warriors, and New Westminster Royals.
