= 1957 Ice Hockey World Championships =

1957 edition of the IIHF World Ice Hockey Championship

Tournament details
- Host country: Soviet Union
- Venue: Luzhniki Palace of Sports
- Dates: 24 February – 5 March
- Teams: 8

Final positions
- Champions: Sweden (2nd title)
- Runners-up: Soviet Union
- Third place: Czechoslovakia
- Fourth place: Finland

Tournament statistics
- Games played: 28
- Goals scored: 300 (10.71 per game)
- Attendance: 223,700 (7,989 per game)
- Scoring leader: (Soviet Union) Konstantin Loktev (18 points)

The 1957 Ice Hockey World Championships were held between 24 February and 5 March 1957 at the Palace of Sports of the Central Lenin Stadium in Moscow, USSR.

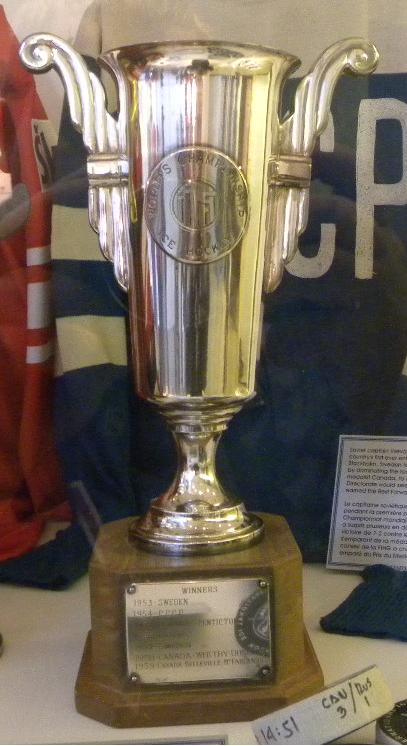
Trophy awarded for the 1957 World Championships

This was the last World Championships played on natural ice; and were the first World Championships held in the Soviet Union and they are remembered for the political circumstances surrounding the games. Hungary had been recently occupied by the Soviet Army (to suppress a revolution in October and November 1956), and as a result, the United States and Canada boycotted the World Championships in protest. Joining them were Norway, West Germany, Italy and Switzerland. East Germany participated at the top level for the first time.

== Competition ==
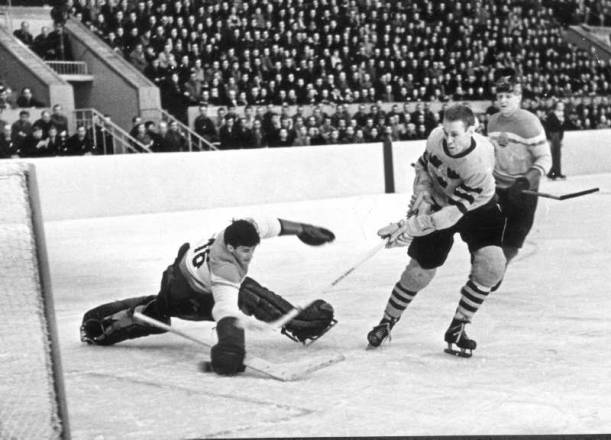
Sven Johansson of Sweden scores a goal against East Germany. Sweden won the match 11–1.

With the boycott, the home team USSR was heavily favoured to win the tournament, but Sweden surprised the world by pulling off an upset. The first step was taken in their third game, when they beat Czechoslovakia 2–0. This important victory was saved by the head of Leksands IF defenseman Vilgot Larsson. He literally headed the puck away from the Swedish net to save a goal, and in the days before mandatory helmets, received several stitches for his heroics. In the final game, Sweden opened with two goals, but the dynamic Soviets responded with four goals of their own. Down by two in the third period, goals by Eilert Määttä and Erling Lindström tied the game, and the goaltending of Thord Flodqvist and play of Sven "Tumba" Johansson guaranteed the final draw. The USSR had previously only tied Czechoslovakia, so all Sweden needed was one point, or a tie, for gold.

Karel Straka of Czechoslovakia was named best goaltender. Nikolaï Sologubov of the USSR was best defenceman, and Sven "Tumba" Johansson of Sweden was best forward. Konstantin Loktev of the USSR led all scorers with 18 points (on 11 goals and 7 assists), followed by Nils Nilsson and Ronald Pettersson of Sweden, both with 16 points. Vsevolod Bobrov of the USSR led all scorers with 13 goals. Japan competed for the first time since 1930, and finished last with one point in the standings.

The Soviets did not have the Swedish national anthem ready for the gold medal ceremony. To compensate for this, the Swedish players decided to sing the anthem over the stadium's PA system. However, few players knew the anthem by heart so they decided to play a little prank on the Soviets and instead sang the Swedish drinking song "Helan Går". Swedish captain Lasse Björn later recalled the story of Marshal Zhukov, the Minister of Defence of the Soviet Union, standing to attention for a simple Swedish drinking song.

== Standings ==
Pos	Team	Pld	W	L	D	GF	GA	GD	Pts
1	Sweden	7	6	0	1	62	11	+51	13
2	Soviet Union	7	5	0	2	77	9	+68	12
3	Czechoslovakia	7	5	1	1	66	9	+57	11
4	Finland	7	4	3	0	28	33	−5	8
5	East Germany	7	3	4	0	23	48	−25	6
6	Poland	7	2	5	0	25	45	−20	4
7	Austria	7	0	6	1	8	61	−53	1
8	Japan	7	0	6	1	11	84	−73	1

== Final round ==
24 February	Finland	5–3	Poland

24 February	Soviet Union	16–0	Japan

24 February	Sweden	11–1	East Germany

24 February	Czechoslovakia	9–0	Austria

25 February	Soviet Union	11–1	Finland

25 February	Czechoslovakia	15–1	East Germany

25 February	Sweden	8–3	Poland

26 February	Austria	3–3	Japan

27 February	Sweden	2–0	Czechoslovakia

27 February	Poland	8–3	Japan

27 February	Soviet Union	22–1	Austria

27 February	Finland	5–3	East Germany

28 February	Czechoslovakia	3–0	Finland

28 February	Soviet Union	10–1	Poland

1 March	Sweden	10–0	Austria

1 March	East Germany	9–2	Japan

2 March	Finland	9–2	Austria

2 March	Soviet Union	2–2	Czechoslovakia

2 March	East Germany	6–2	Poland

2 March	Sweden	18–0	Japan

3 March	Poland	5–1	Austria

4 March	Czechoslovakia	25–1	Japan

4 March	Sweden	9–3	Finland

4 March	East Germany	0–12	Soviet Union

5 March	East Germany	3–1	Austria

5 March	Finland	5–2	Japan

5 March	Czechoslovakia	12–3	Poland

5 March	Soviet Union	4–4	Sweden

== Attendance record ==
The final game (USSR versus Sweden for the championship) was played on the football field of the Grand Sports Arena of the Luzhniki Stadium. It is reputed that over 50,000 fans (or 55,000, depending on sources) saw the game, the most ever for an international hockey game. This stood as the world record until 6 October 2001, when 74,544 fans saw Michigan State University and the University of Michigan play an American NCAA Hockey game outdoors at Spartan Stadium in East Lansing, Michigan.

== European Championship medal table ==
Games played against Japan did not count for the purposes of determining the European champion. Since six of the seven European participants defeated Japan, and since the only opponent that did not defeat Japan (Austria) also lost to each of their European opponents, finishing order for the European championship table was the same as it was for the main championship table.

1st place, gold medalist(s)	Sweden
2nd place, silver medalist(s)	Soviet Union
3rd place, bronze medalist(s)	Czechoslovakia
4	Finland
5	East Germany
6	Poland
7	Austria

=== Tournament awards ===
- Best players selected by the directorate:
  - Best Goaltender: (Czechoslovakia) Karel Straka
  - Best Defenceman: (Soviet Union) Nikolaï Sologubov
  - Best Forward: (Sweden) Sven Tumba

== Citations ==
Preceded by	Ice hockey game attendance record 55,000	Succeeded by Michigan at Michigan State (NCAA); 6 October 2001
