= 1962 Ice Hockey World Championships =

1962 edition of the World Ice Hockey Championships

Tournament details
- Host country: United States
- Dates: 8–18 March
- Teams: 8

Final positions
- Champions: Sweden (3rd title)
- Runners-up: Canada
- Third place: United States
- Fourth place: Finland

Tournament statistics
- Games played: 28
- Goals scored: 310 (11.07 per game)
- Attendance: 70,702 (2,525 per game)
- Scoring leader: (Sweden) Nisse Nilsson 18 points

The 1962 Ice Hockey World Championships was the 29th edition of the Ice Hockey World Championships. The tournament was held in Colorado Springs and Denver, United States from 8 to 18 March 1962. This was the first World Championship hosted in North America that was not part of ice hockey at the Olympic Games. It also remains the only IIHF World Championship ever held in the United States that was not also part of the Olympics.

The World Championships were in jeopardy of being cancelled to the political situation in Europe and the Berlin Wall. Sweden won their third World, and their ninth European title. Canada, represented by the Galt Terriers, lost only to the Swedes finishing second, followed by the host Americans. In the 'B' pool, the Australian team defeated Denmark for their first victory ever.

== Political issues ==
The World Championships were scheduled to be hosted in Colorado Springs, Colorado, but the event was placed in jeopardy due to the political situation in Europe. When the Berlin Wall was constructed in 1961 by East Germany to prevent its citizens from fleeing to the West, NATO responded with travel restrictions which prevented the East Germany national ice hockey team from attending the World Championships. Canadian Amateur Hockey Association president Jack Roxburgh felt that politics should not affect sports, and that the decision went against the goodwill and relations established by teams traveling behind the Iron Curtain. He called for the International Ice Hockey Federation to unite in opposition to the NATO decision. Teams from the Soviet Union and other communist countries ultimately chose to withdraw in protest of the NATO decision.

== Qualifying round (A/B) ==
With the absences of the USSR, Czechoslovakia, and East Germany, the top two nations from the 1961 'B' pool were elevated (Norway and Great Britain). The third and final spot was filled by a qualifying game between the only remaining 'B' pool nations.

07 March	Switzerland	9-4	Austria

Switzerland qualified in Group A

Austria qualified in Group B

== World Championship Group A (United States) ==
=== Final round ===
Pos	Team	Pld	W	D	L	GF	GA	GD	Pts
1	Sweden	7	7	0	0	67	10	+57	14
2	Canada	7	6	0	1	58	12	+46	12
3	United States	7	5	0	2	54	23	+31	10
4	Finland	7	3	0	4	32	42	−10	6
5	Norway	7	3	0	4	32	54	−22	6
6	West Germany	7	2	0	5	27	36	−9	4
7	Switzerland	7	1	0	6	21	60	−39	2
8	Great Britain	7	1	0	6	19	73	−54	2

08 March	Great Britain	3-6	Switzerland

08 March	United States	14-2	Norway

08 March	Finland	1-8	Canada

09 March	Finland	5-7	Great Britain

09 March	Sweden	17-2	Switzerland

09 March	West Germany	4-6	Norway

10 March	United States	1-2	Sweden

10 March	Canada	8-0	West Germany

11 March	Canada	7-2	Switzerland

11 March	Great Britain	2-12	Norway

11 March	United States	6-3	Finland

12 March	Norway	7-5	Switzerland

12 March	Great Britain	0-9	West Germany

12 March	Sweden	12-2	Finland

13 March	Canada	3-5	Sweden

13 March	United States	8-4	West Germany

14 March	Finland	7-4	Switzerland

14 March	United States	12-5	Great Britain

14 March	Canada	14-1	Norway

15 March	West Germany	3-9	Finland

15 March	Sweden	17-0	Great Britain

16 March	Sweden	10-2	Norway

16 March	United States	12-1	Switzerland

17 March	Finland	5-2	Norway

17 March	Great Britain	2-12	Canada

17 March	Sweden	4-0	West Germany

18 March	United States	1-6	Canada

18 March	West Germany	7-1	Switzerland

== World Championship Group B (United States) ==
=== Final round ===
Pos	Team	Pld	W	D	L	GF	GA	GD	Pts
9	Japan	5	5	0	0	63	16	+47	10
10	Austria	5	4	0	1	49	9	+40	8
11	France	5	3	0	2	35	25	+10	6
12	Netherlands	5	2	0	3	20	46	−26	4
13	Australia	5	1	0	4	13	51	−38	2
14	Denmark	5	0	0	5	9	42	−33	0

08 March	Australia	4-6	Netherlands

09 March	Japan	10-8	France

10 March	Australia	0-17	Austria

10 March	Netherlands	9-4	Denmark

11 March	France	7-2	Denmark

12 March	Australia	2-13	Japan

13 March	France	13-1	Australia

13 March	Netherlands	1-12	Austria

14 March	Japan	7-3	Austria

15 March	France	6-2	Netherlands

15 March	Denmark	2-6	Australia

16 March	Netherlands	2-20	Japan

16 March	France	1-10	Austria

17 March	Japan	13-1	Denmark

18 March	Denmark	0-7	Austria

== Ranking and statistics ==
1962 IIHF World Championship winners

Sweden
3rd title

=== Tournament Awards ===
- Best players selected by the directorate:
  - Best Goaltender: (Sweden) Lennart Häggroth
  - Best Defenceman: (United States) John Mayasich
  - Best Forward: (Sweden) Sven Tumba
- Media All-Star Team:
  - Goaltender: (Sweden) Lennart Häggroth
  - Defence: (Canada) Jack Douglas, (Canada) Harry Smith
  - Forwards: (Canada) Jackie McLeod, (Sweden) Nisse Nilsson, (Sweden) Ulf Sterner

=== Final standings ===
The final standings of the tournament according to IIHF:

1st place, gold medalist(s)	Sweden
2nd place, silver medalist(s)	Canada
3rd place, bronze medalist(s)	United States
4	Finland
5	Norway
6	West Germany
7	Switzerland
8	Great Britain

=== European championships final standings ===
The final standings of the European championships according to IIHF:

Gold medal	Sweden
Silver medal	Finland
Bronze medal	Norway
4	West Germany
5	Switzerland
6	Great Britain
