= 1963 Ice Hockey World Championships =

1963 edition of the World Ice Hockey Championships

Tournament details
- Host country: Sweden
- Dates: 7–17 March
- Teams: 8

Final positions
- Champions: Soviet Union (3rd title)
- Runners-up: Sweden
- Third place: Czechoslovakia
- Fourth place: Canada

Tournament statistics
- Games played: 28
- Goals scored: 256 (9.14 per game)
- Attendance: 216,056 (7,716 per game)
- Scoring leader: (Canada) Harold Jones (12 points)

The 1963 Ice Hockey World Championships was the 30th edition of the Ice Hockey World Championships. The tournament was held in Stockholm, Sweden from March 7 to March 17, 1963. The Soviet Union won the tournament for the third time, starting their roll of nine straight championships. For the Soviets it was also their seventh European title.

A new tie-breaking method was introduced and was effective for this World Championship only: Any tie on points for a medal place would be decided according to goal differential involving only the top five placed nations. If a tie for a medal place continued among only two teams, the second step was to award the superior medal to the winner of the game played between the two. The purpose of the change was to lessen the incentive for top teams to run up the score on weaker teams. This formula was immediately called upon to decide the medals and greatly magnified the drama on the final day, as the Soviets won the gold by a one-goal margin (+8 to +7), rather than a seven-goal margin (+41 to +34) under the previous system.

Heading into the last day, the Swedes were two points ahead of the Soviets, having defeated them 2–1; Sweden was +8 on the first tiebreaker while the Soviets were +6. The first game of the day was East Germany vs U.S.A., seemingly a game of small significance—but an American win would propel them into fifth place, displacing Finland, and would give Sweden +19 on the first tiebreaker (due to Sweden's 17–2 win over the Americans) while the Soviets would have +10. An American shot hit the East German crossbar with three seconds left in the game, and it ended 3-3. The four-way tie for fifth place was resolved according to goal difference among all teams in the group. Sweden's edge on the first tiebreaker remained +8 to +6.

Next up was Sweden vs. Czechoslovakia. The Swedes needed a single point to clinch the gold, but Czechoslovakia won 3–2 to clinch the bronze. The last game of the tournament between the Soviet Union and Canada would then decide gold and silver, with the loser of the game placing fourth. Sweden's tiebreaker edge over the Soviets was now +7 to +6. The Soviets needed to win by more than one goal to take the gold. A one-goal margin would clinch the gold for Sweden, winners of the head-to-head game. Canada needed a win to take the silver. In the end, everything went the Soviets' way on the final day, as they prevailed 4–2 on Sweden's home ice.

A record twenty-one nations participated, at three levels, with most nations returning to the group where they played in 1961. This meant that the unfortunate Norwegians, despite defeating and placing higher than West Germany in 1962, returned to the 'B' pool. Even in the neutral site of Sweden, there was still a political incident. Unlike in 1961, the two German nations ended up playing their game against each other, with the West winning. Following the game when the winners flag was raised, the East Germans refused to acknowledge it, and were suspended for three months following their final game.

The North American entries were historically poor. The Trail Smoke Eaters, representing Canada, finished out of the medals for the first time. It would be the last time that an Allan Cup champion would be selected to represent Canada. The Americans lost to everyone except the two German teams, finishing last.

== World Championship Group A (Sweden) ==
=== Final Round ===
Pos	Team	Pld	W	D	L	GF	GA	GD	Pts
1	Soviet Union	7	6	0	1	50	9	+41	12
2	Sweden	7	6	0	1	44	10	+34	12
3	Czechoslovakia	7	5	1	1	41	16	+25	11
4	Canada	7	4	1	2	46	23	+23	9
5	Finland	7	1	1	5	20	35	−15	3
6	East Germany	7	1	1	5	16	43	−27	3
7	West Germany	7	1	1	5	18	56	−38	3
8	United States	7	1	1	5	21	64	−43	3

7 March	Czechoslovakia	10–1	West Germany

7 March	Finland	1–6	Soviet Union

7 March	Sweden	5–1	East Germany

8 March	West Germany	0–6	Canada

8 March	Finland	11–3	United States

8 March	Sweden	2–1	Soviet Union

9 March	Canada	11–5	East Germany

9 March	Czechoslovakia	10–1	United States

10 March	West Germany	3–15	Soviet Union

10 March	Czechoslovakia	8–3	East Germany

10 March	Sweden	4–0	Finland

11 March	Finland	4–4	West Germany

11 March	Canada	10–4	United States

12 March	Soviet Union	12–0	East Germany

12 March	Canada	4–4	Czechoslovakia

12 March	Sweden	17–2	United States

13 March	East Germany	1–0	Finland

13 March	Sweden	10–2	West Germany

14 March	West Germany	4–8	United States

14 March	Czechoslovakia	1–3	Soviet Union

14 March	Finland	2–12	Canada

15 March	Soviet Union	9–0	United States

15 March	Czechoslovakia	5–2	Finland

15 March	Sweden	4–1	Canada

16 March	West Germany	4–3	East Germany

17 March	United States	3–3	East Germany

17 March	Sweden	2–3	Czechoslovakia

17 March	Soviet Union	4–2	Canada

== World Championship Group B (Sweden) ==
=== Final Round ===
Pos	Team	Pld	W	D	L	GF	GA	GD	Pts
9	Norway	6	5	0	1	35	15	+20	10
10	Switzerland	6	4	1	1	28	10	+18	9
11	Romania	6	4	1	1	29	17	+12	9
12	Poland	6	4	0	2	52	13	+39	8
13	Yugoslavia	6	2	0	4	23	49	−26	4
14	France	6	1	0	5	14	38	−24	2
15	Great Britain	6	0	0	6	8	47	−39	0

7 March	Switzerland	8–0	Great Britain

7 March	Romania	4–3	Poland

8 March	Norway	8–2	France

8 March	Switzerland	8–1	Yugoslavia

8 March	Romania	8–1	Great Britain

9 March	Poland	6–2	Norway

9 March	Yugoslavia	7–3	France

10 March	Switzerland	4–4	Romania

10 March	Poland	10–0	Great Britain

11 March	Switzerland	5–0	France

11 March	Romania	7–4	Yugoslavia

11 March	Norway	9–2	Great Britain

12 March	Poland	10–1	France

12 March	Norway	7–3	Yugoslavia

13 March	Switzerland	2–1	Poland

14 March	Romania	5–0	France

14 March	Yugoslavia	4–2	Great Britain

14 March	Norway	4–1	Switzerland

16 March	Poland	22–4	Yugoslavia

16 March	France	8–3	Great Britain

16 March	Norway	5–1	Romania

== World Championship Group C (Sweden) ==
=== Final Round ===
Pos	Team	Pld	W	D	L	GF	GA	GD	Pts
16	Austria	5	5	0	0	62	7	+55	10
17	Hungary	5	4	0	1	57	12	+45	8
18	Denmark	5	3	0	2	22	31	−9	6
19	Bulgaria	5	1	1	3	19	22	−3	3
20	Netherlands	5	1	1	3	21	34	−13	3
21	Belgium	5	0	0	5	8	83	−75	0

7 March	Hungary	25–1	Belgium

7 March	Austria	13–2	Denmark

8 March	Bulgaria	3–3	Netherlands

9 March	Austria	3–1	Hungary

10 March	Bulgaria	7–3	Belgium

10 March	Denmark	4–1	Netherlands

11 March	Austria	13–2	Netherlands

12 March	Hungary	10–3	Denmark

12 March	Austria	30–0	Belgium

13 March	Denmark	5–4	Bulgaria

13 March	Netherlands	13–1	Belgium

14 March	Austria	3–2	Bulgaria

15 March	Hungary	13–2	Netherlands

15 March	Denmark	8–3	Belgium

16 March	Hungary	8–3	Bulgaria

== Ranking and statistics ==
1963 IIHF World Championship winners

Soviet Union

=== Tournament awards ===
- Best players selected by the directorate:
  - Best Goaltender: (Canada) Seth Martin
  - Best Defenceman: (Sweden) Roland Stoltz
  - Best Forward: (Czechoslovakia) Miroslav Vlach
- Media All-Star Team:
  - Goaltender: (Sweden) Kjell Svensson
  - Defence: (Soviet Union) Alexander Ragulin, (Canada) Harry Smith
  - Forwards: (Sweden) Hans Mild, (Canada) Addie Tambellini, (Czechoslovakia) Miroslav Vlach

=== Final standings ===
The final standings of the tournament according to IIHF:

1st place, gold medalist(s)	Soviet Union
2nd place, silver medalist(s)	Sweden
3rd place, bronze medalist(s)	Czechoslovakia
4	Canada
5	Finland
6	East Germany
7	West Germany
8	United States

=== European championships final standings ===
The final standings of the European championships according to IIHF:

Gold medal	Soviet Union
Silver medal	Sweden
Bronze medal	Czechoslovakia
4	West Germany
5	East Germany
6	Finland
