= 1965 Ice Hockey World Championships =

1965 edition of the World Ice Hockey Championships

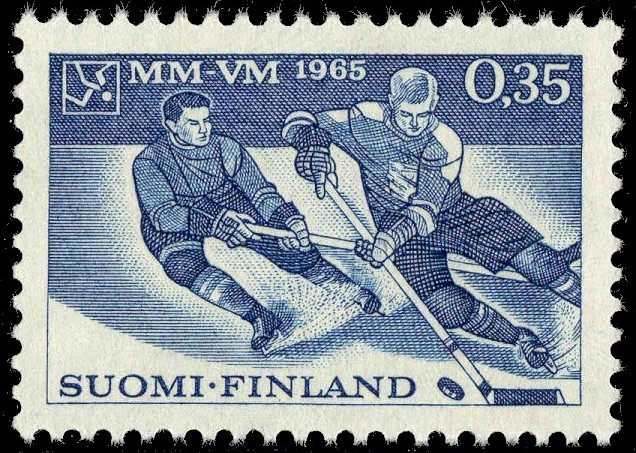
- A Finnish stamp dedicated to the 1965 World Ice Hockey Championships

Tournament details
- Host country: Finland
- Dates: 4–14 March
- Teams: 8

Final positions
- Champions: Soviet Union (5th title)
- Runners-up: Czechoslovakia
- Third place: Sweden
- Fourth place: Canada

Tournament statistics
- Games played: 28
- Goals scored: 221 (7.89 per game)
- Attendance: 178,968 (6,392 per game)
- Scoring leader: (Czechoslovakia) Josef Golonka (14 points)

The 1965 Ice Hockey World Championships took place in Tampere Ice Stadium, Tampere, Finland, 4–14 March. Eight teams took part, each playing each other once. The Soviets became world champions for the fifth time, winning all of their games. This also counted as their ninth European title, with the Czechs finishing second and the Swedes third. For the third straight year Canada finished fourth. The tournament employed new tie-breaking rules, which some believed were supposed to be in place for the Innsbruck Olympics. To decide medals priority would be given to the team who won the head-to-head game, unless they tied, or more than two teams were tied. In those two cases goal differential would be used, but only the goal differential between the top four teams.

Fifteen nations played in two groups, with qualification games used to establish the tier for closely ranked teams. From now on, the last place team in group 'A' would be relegated, with the group 'B' champion being promoted to replace them. Poland went undefeated to earn promotion, defeating the Swiss, and tying the West Germans.

The event was the first Ice Hockey World Championships hosted by Finland, and was organized by Harry Lindblad, president of the Finnish Ice Hockey Association.

== Qualifying round Group A ==
=== First round ===
18 December 1964	West Germany	2–8	Switzerland

20 December 1964	West Germany	7–2	Switzerland

3 January 1965	Switzerland	6–7	West Germany

=== Second round ===
2 March 1965	Norway	5–4	West Germany

Qualified for Group A:	Norway
Qualified for Group B:	Switzerland, West Germany

== World Championship Group A (Tampere, Finland) ==
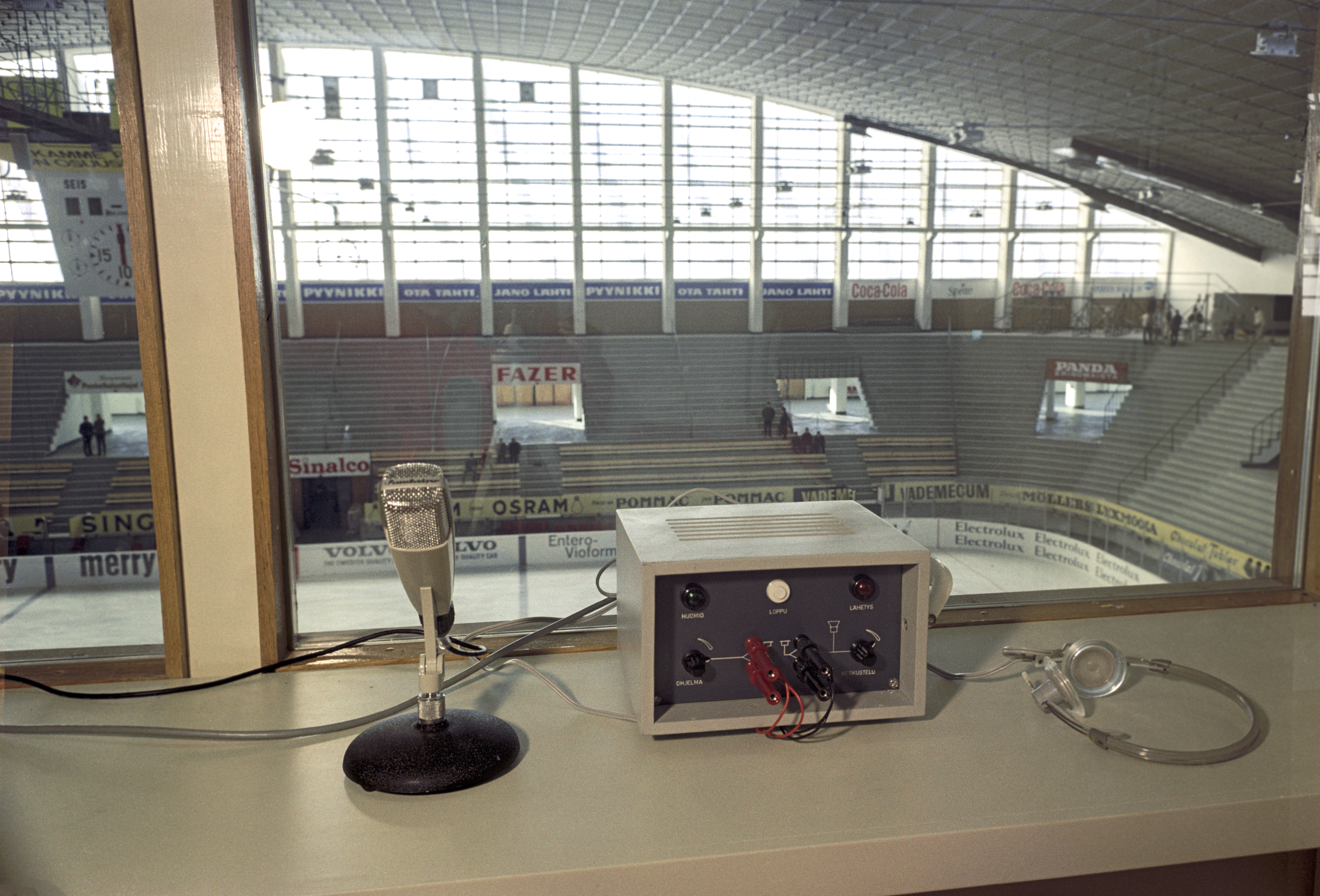
Yle sports commentator booth in Hakametsä 1965.

Pos	Team	Pld	W	D	L	GF	GA	GD	Pts
1	Soviet Union	7	7	0	0	51	13	+38	14
2	Czechoslovakia	7	6	0	1	43	10	+33	12
3	Sweden	7	4	1	2	33	17	+16	9
4	Canada	7	4	0	3	28	21	+7	8
5	East Germany	7	3	0	4	18	33	−15	6
6	United States	7	2	0	5	22	44	−22	4
7	Finland	7	1	1	5	14	27	−13	3
8	Norway	7	0	0	7	12	56	−44	0

Norway was relegated to 1966 Group B.

4 March	Sweden	5–2	United States

4 March	Soviet Union	8–4	Finland

4 March	Czechoslovakia	5–1	East Germany

5 March	Sweden	5–1	East Germany

5 March	Finland	0–4	Canada

5 March	Norway	2–14	Soviet Union

6 March	United States	0–12	Czechoslovakia

6 March	Canada	6–0	Norway

7 March	Finland	2–2	Sweden

7 March	Canada	5–2	United States

7 March	Soviet Union	8–0	East Germany

8 March	Czechoslovakia	9–2	Norway

9 March	Finland	4–1	Norway

9 March	East Germany	7–4	United States

10 March	Soviet Union	5–3	Sweden

10 March	Canada	8–1	East Germany

10 March	Finland	2–5	Czechoslovakia

11 March	Sweden	10–0	Norway

11 March	Czechoslovakia	8–0	Canada

11 March	United States	2–9	Soviet Union

12 March	United States	4–0	Finland

12 March	East Germany	5–1	Norway

13 March	Sweden	6–4	Canada

13 March	Finland	2–3	East Germany

13 March	Soviet Union	3–1	Czechoslovakia

14 March	Czechoslovakia	3–2	Sweden

14 March	Canada	1–4	Soviet Union

14 March	United States	8–6	Norway

== Qualifying round Group B ==
19 November 1964	Italy	2–3	Hungary

26 November 1964	Hungary	2–2	Italy

5 December 1964	Great Britain	8–2	France

12 December 1964	France	3–2	Great Britain

Qualified for Group B:	Hungary, Great Britain
Teams in 1966 Group B qualification:	France, Italy

== World Championship Group B (Turku, Rauma, and Pori, Finland) ==
Pos	Team	Pld	W	D	L	GF	GA	GD	Pts	Qualification
1	Poland	6	5	1	0	35	15	+20	11	
2	Switzerland	6	4	1	1	27	15	+12	9	
3	West Germany	6	3	2	1	30	20	+10	8	
4	Hungary	6	2	1	3	19	24	−5	5	
5	Austria	6	2	0	4	21	28	−7	4	
6	Great Britain	6	1	1	4	24	41	−17	3	
7	Yugoslavia	6	0	2	4	16	29	−13	2	
X	Romania	0	0	0	0	0	0	0	0	Did not participate

Poland earned promotion to the 1966 Group A. Romania joined France and Italy in the following year's qualification for Group B.

4 March	Switzerland	7–2	Austria

4 March	Poland	9–5	Hungary

4 March	Yugoslavia	5–5	Great Britain

5 March	Poland	5–3	Austria

5 March	West Germany	8–2	Yugoslavia

6 March	Switzerland	3–1	Hungary

6 March	West Germany	12–4	Great Britain

7 March	Austria	5–4	Great Britain

7 March	Poland	3–1	Switzerland

7 March	Hungary	3–0	Yugoslavia

8 March	West Germany	2–1	Austria

9 March	Switzerland	3–3	Yugoslavia

9 March	West Germany	4–4	Hungary

9 March	Poland	11–2	Great Britain

10 March	Austria	6–5	Yugoslavia

11 March	Hungary	5–3	Austria

11 March	Poland	3–3	West Germany

11 March	Switzerland	7–4	Great Britain

12 March	Poland	4–1	Yugoslavia

12 March	Switzerland	6–1	West Germany

12 March	Hungary	1–5	Great Britain

== Ranking and statistics ==
1965 IIHF World Championship winners

Soviet Union
5th title

=== Tournament Awards ===
- Best players selected by the directorate:
  - Best Goaltender: (Czechoslovakia) Vladimír Dzurilla
  - Best Defenceman: (Czechoslovakia) František Tikal
  - Best Forward: (Soviet Union) Vyacheslav Starshinov
- Media All-Star Team:
  - Goaltender: (Czechoslovakia) Vladimír Dzurilla
  - Defence: (Soviet Union) Alexander Ragulin, (Czechoslovakia) František Tikal
  - Forwards: (Soviet Union) Alexander Almetov, (Czechoslovakia) Jaroslav Jiřík, (Soviet Union) Konstantin Loktev

=== Final standings ===
The final standings of the tournament according to IIHF:

1st place, gold medalist(s)	Soviet Union
2nd place, silver medalist(s)	Czechoslovakia
3rd place, bronze medalist(s)	Sweden
4	Canada
5	East Germany
6	United States
7	Finland
8	Norway

=== European championships final standings ===
The final standings of the European championships according to IIHF:

1st place, gold medalist(s)	Soviet Union
2nd place, silver medalist(s)	Czechoslovakia
3rd place, bronze medalist(s)	Sweden
4	East Germany
5	Finland
6	Norway
