= 1958 Ice Hockey World Championships =

1958 edition of the World Ice Hockey Championships

Tournament details
- Host country: Norway
- Venue: 1 (in 1 host city)
- Dates: 28 February – 9 March
- Teams: 8

Final positions
- Champions: Canada (17th title)
- Runners-up: Soviet Union
- Third place: Sweden
- Fourth place: Czechoslovakia

Tournament statistics
- Games played: 28
- Goals scored: 257 (9.18 per game)
- Attendance: 73,786 (2,635 per game)
- Scoring leader: (Canada) Connie Broden (19 points)

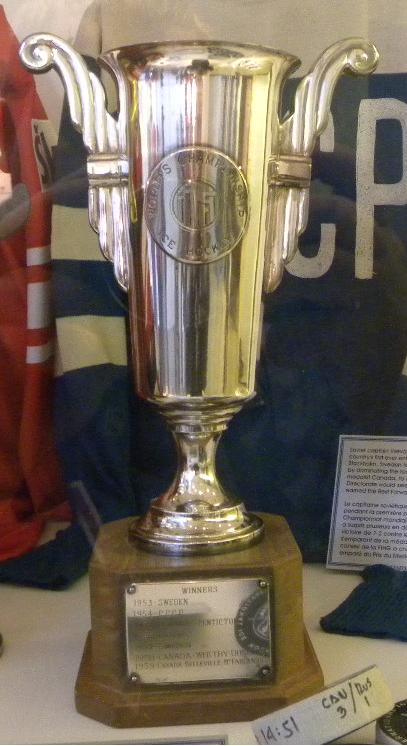
Trophy awarded for the 1958 World Championships

The 1958 Ice Hockey World Championships were held between February 28 and March 9, 1958, in Oslo, Norway at the Jordal Amfi arena. The Whitby Dunlops represented Canada, winning the World Championship for the 17th time. The Soviets lost the final game to the Canadians 4–2, settling for both silver and their fourth European Championship. Scoring leader Connie Broden is the only player to win the Stanley Cup and the World Championship in the same year, having played on the Montreal Canadiens' championship team.

== Standings ==
| Pos | Team | Pld | W | D | L | GF | GA | GD | Pts |
|---|---|---|---|---|---|---|---|---|---|
| 1 | Canada | 7 | 7 | 0 | 0 | 82 | 6 | +76 | 14 |
| 2 | Soviet Union | 7 | 5 | 1 | 1 | 44 | 15 | +29 | 11 |
| 3 | Sweden | 7 | 5 | 0 | 2 | 46 | 22 | +24 | 10 |
| 4 | Czechoslovakia | 7 | 3 | 2 | 2 | 21 | 21 | 0 | 8 |
| 5 | United States | 7 | 3 | 1 | 3 | 29 | 33 | −4 | 7 |
| 6 | Finland | 7 | 1 | 1 | 5 | 9 | 51 | −42 | 3 |
| 7 | Norway | 7 | 1 | 0 | 6 | 12 | 44 | −32 | 2 |
| 8 | Poland | 7 | 0 | 1 | 6 | 14 | 65 | −51 | 1 |

== Final round ==
| 28 February | United States | 12–4 | Poland |

| 28 February | Czechoslovakia | 5–1 | Finland |

| 28 February | Norway | 0–9 | Sweden |

| 1 March | Sweden | 5–2 | Finland |

| 1 March | Norway | 2–10 | Soviet Union |

| 1 March | Canada | 14–1 | Poland |

| 2 March | Soviet Union | 10–0 | Finland |

| 2 March | Norway | 0–12 | Canada |

| 3 March | Czechoslovakia | 7–1 | Poland |

| 3 March | Canada | 24–0 | Finland |

| 4 March | Soviet Union | 4–4 | Czechoslovakia |

| 4 March | Sweden | 8–3 | United States |

| 5 March | Norway | 1–6 | United States |

| 5 March | Finland | 2–2 | Poland |

| 6 March | Canada | 10–2 | Sweden |

| 6 March | Czechoslovakia | 2–2 | United States |

| 6 March | Soviet Union | 10–1 | Poland |

| 6 March | Norway | 1–2 | Finland |

| 7 March | Canada | 6–0 | Czechoslovakia |

| 7 March | Sweden | 12–2 | Poland |

| 7 March | Soviet Union | 4–1 | United States |

| 8 March | Norway | 0–2 | Czechoslovakia |

| 8 March | Soviet Union | 4–3 | Sweden |

| 8 March | Canada | 12–1 | United States |

| 9 March | United States | 4–2 | Finland |

| 9 March | Sweden | 7–1 | Czechoslovakia |

| 9 March | Norway | 8–3 | Poland |

| 9 March | Canada | 4–2 | Soviet Union |

== European Championship medal table ==
| 1st place, gold medalist(s) | Soviet Union |
| 2nd place, silver medalist(s) | Sweden |
| 3rd place, bronze medalist(s) | Czechoslovakia |
| 4 | Finland |
| 5 | Norway |
| 6 | Poland |

=== Tournament awards ===
- Best players selected by the directorate:
  - Best Goaltender: (Czechoslovakia) Vladimír Nadrchal
  - Best Defenceman: (Soviet Union) Ivan Tregubov
  - Best Forward: (Canada) Charlie Burns
