= Lasse Björn =

Swedish ice hockey player (1931–2024)

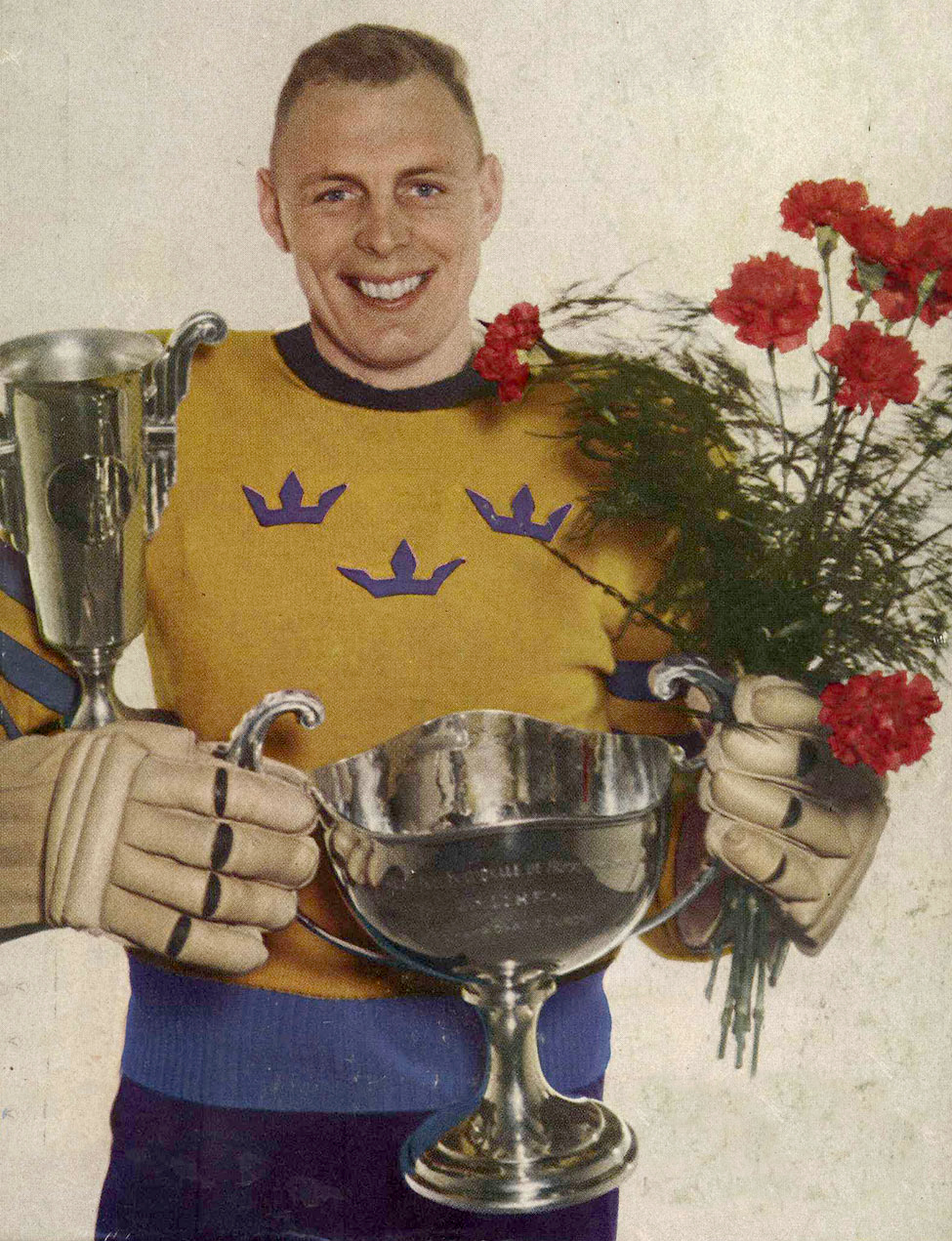
- Björn at the 1957 World Championships
- Born: 16 December 1931 Stockholm, Sweden
- Died: 14 August 2024 (aged 92)
- Height: 1.93 m (6 ft 4 in)
- Weight: 103 kg (227 lb; 16 st 3 lb)
- Position: Defence
- Shot: Left
- Played for: Djurgårdens IF
- National team: Sweden
- Playing career: 1949–1966
Medal record
Men's ice hockey
Representing Sweden
Olympic Games
Bronze medal – third place	1952 Oslo	Team competition
World Championships
Bronze medal – third place	1958 Oslo	Team
Gold medal – first place	1957 Moscow	Team
Bronze medal – third place	1954 Stockholm	Team
Gold medal – first place	1953 Basel and Zurich	Team

Lars Gunnar Raldo "Lasse" Björn (16 December 1931 – 14 August 2024) was a Swedish ice hockey player. As a defenceman, he played 216 games for the Sweden men's national team and participated in nine Ice Hockey World Championships and three Winter Olympics. He won nine Swedish ice hockey championships with Djurgårdens IF, who retired jersey number 12 in his honor. He was inducted into the International Ice Hockey Federation Hall of Fame in 1998.

== Early life ==
Lars Gunnar Raldo Björn was born on 16 December 1931 in Stockholm, Sweden. He grew up in the Traneberg district, and played football as a youth with Westermalms IF. He began playing hockey with BK Cometen in Traneberg, then was recruited to join Djurgårdens IF at age 17 in 1949.

== Career ==
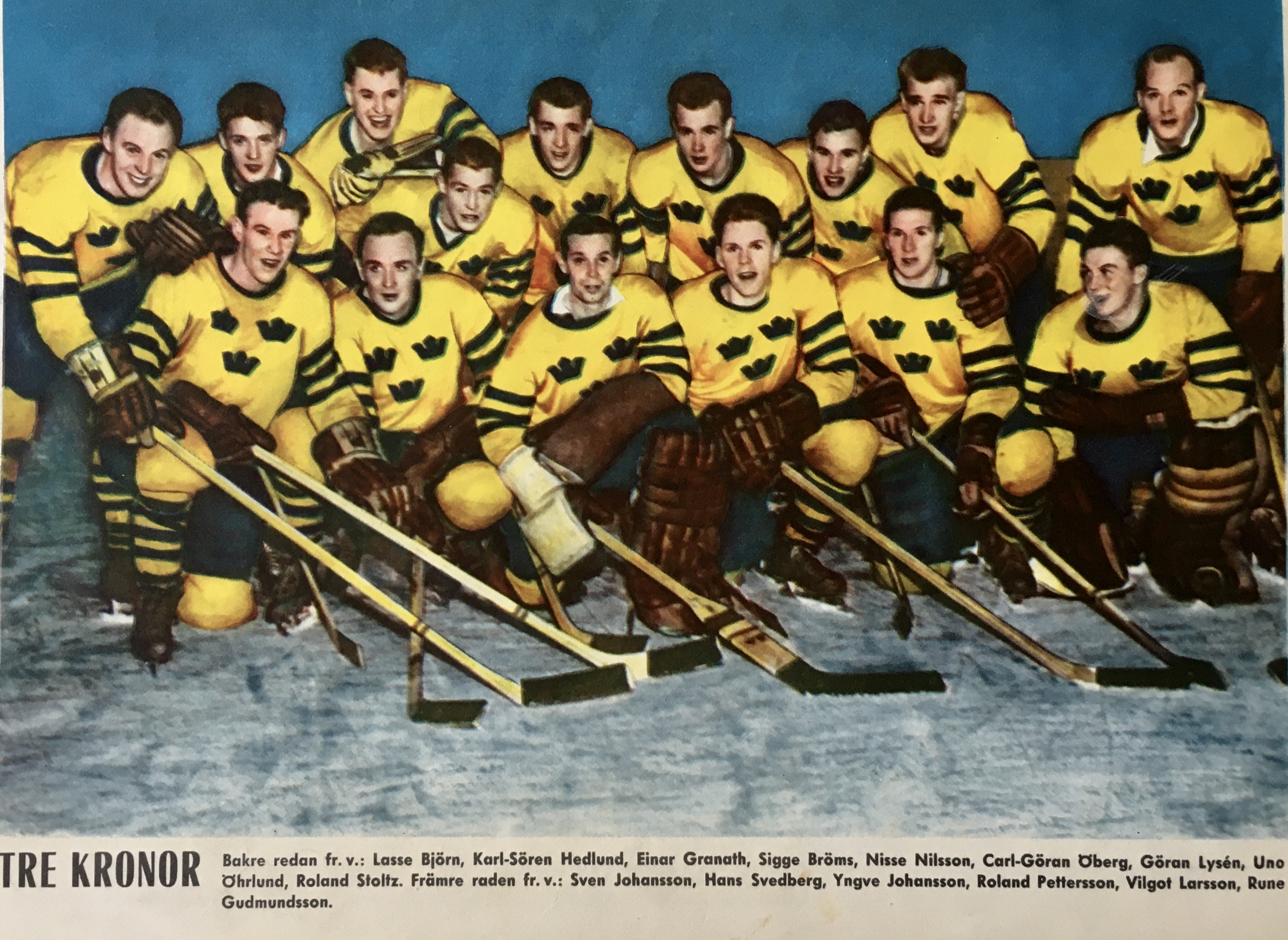
Sweden men's national ice hockey team in 1958 (Björn standing on left end)

As a defenceman, Björn played for Djurgårdens IF from 1949 to 1966. He won a Swedish ice hockey championship in his first season with Djurgården, then won an additional eight championships by his retirement. He was a longtime defense partner with Roland Stoltz. As of 2024, Björn's nine Swedish championships is tied with Tord Lundström for the most by any player.

Internationally, he played 216 games for the Sweden men's national ice hockey team. He began with the national team in 1951 and competed in his first international tournament at the 1952 Winter Olympics in Oslo. He participated in three Winter Olympics, winning one bronze medal in 1952; he also played in nine IIHF World Championship tournaments, winning gold in 1953 and 1957 and three bronze medals. He served as captain of the Sweden national team in 1957. He played only one game in the 1960 Winter Olympics after breaking his rib cage in a collision with Canadian player Floyd Martin.

Björn retired from the Sweden national team and Djurgårdens IF after the 1965–66 season to spend more time with his family, following a dispute with Swedish Ice Hockey Association chairman Helge Berglund. Björn later spent several years coaching with Djurgårdens IF and Stockholm TV.

== Personal life and death ==
Björn was the maternal grandfather of retired player Douglas Murray, who played defense in the National Hockey League and one season with Djurgårdens IF.

Björn operated a haulage company, was married to Margareta, had two children, and resided on Stora Essingen in Stockholm. He died on 14 August 2024, at age 92.

== Honors and legacy ==
Björn was primarily known by the nickname "Lasse". He was the second person elected to Djurgården's hall of fame, and had his jersey number 12 retired by the club in his honor. He was inducted into the International Ice Hockey Federation Hall of Fame in 1998.

== Statistics ==
Individual statistics from the top level of international play at the Olympic Games and the Ice Hockey World Championships (IHWC):

Year	Team	Event	GP	G	A	Pts	PIM
1952	Sweden	Olympics	7	0	2	2	10
1953	Sweden	IHWC	3	1	1	2	2
1954	Sweden	IHWC	7	1	0	1	6
1955	Sweden	IHWC	8	1	2	3	14
1956	Sweden	Olympics	7	3	1	4	10
1957	Sweden	IHWC	7	3	0	3	6
1958	Sweden	IHWC	7	1	1	2	10
1959	Sweden	IHWC	8	0	1	1	10
1960	Sweden	Olympics	1	0	0	0	2
1961	Sweden	IHWC	6	1	2	3	8
Totals			61	11	10	21	78
