= East Germany at the 1968 Winter Olympics =

- Flag of Germany superimposed with the Olympic rings
- IOC code: GDR
- NOC: National Olympic Committee of the German Democratic Republic

in Grenoble
- Competitors: 57 (45 men, 12 women) in 9 sports
- Flag bearer: Thomas Köhler (luge)
- Medals Ranked 10th: Gold 1 Silver 2 Bronze 2 Total 5

Winter Olympics appearances (overview)
- 1968; 1972; 1976; 1980; 1984; 1988

Other related appearances
- Germany (1928–1936, 1952, 1992–pres.); United Team of Germany (1956–1964)

East Germany (German Democratic Republic) competed at the 1968 Winter Olympics in Grenoble, France. East German athletes had competed together with West German athletes as the United Team of Germany in the previous three Winter Olympic Games, but both nations sent independent teams starting in 1968.

== Medalists ==
Medal	Name	Sport	Event
Gold	Klaus-Michael Bonsack; Thomas Köhler	Luge	Men's doubles
Silver	Gabriele Seyfert	Figure skating	Women's singles
Silver	Thomas Köhler	Luge	Men's individual
Bronze	Klaus-Michael Bonsack	Luge	Men's individual
Bronze	Andreas Kunz	Nordic combined	Men's individual

== Alpine skiing ==
Men

Athlete	Event	Race 1		Race 2		Total	
Athlete	Event	Time	Rank	Time	Rank	Time	Rank
Eberhard Riedel	Downhill					DNF	–
Eberhard Riedel	Giant Slalom	1:55.59	53	1:51.08	25	3:46.67	41

Men's slalom

Athlete	Heat 1		Heat 2		Final					
Athlete	Time	Rank	Time	Rank	Time 1	Rank	Time 2	Rank	Total	Rank
Eberhard Riedel	53.62	1 QF	–	–	52.00	25	52.07	16	1:44.07	13

== Biathlon ==
Men

Event	Athlete	Time	Penalties	Adjusted time ^{1}	Rank
20 km	Heinz Kluge	1'19:55.2	7	1'26:55.2	24
20 km	Hansjörg Knauthe	1'23:04.9	2	1'25:04.9	21
20 km	Dieter Speer	1'18:13.3	6	1'24:13.3	18
20 km	Horst Koschka	1'18:37.7	3	1'21:37.7	10

^{1} One minute added per close miss (a hit in the outer ring), two minutes added per complete miss.

Men's 4 x 7.5 km relay

Athletes	Race		
Athletes	Misses ^{2}	Time	Rank
Heinz Kluge; Hans-Gert Jahn; Horst Koschka; Dieter Speer	4	2'21:54.5	6

^{2} A penalty loop of 200 metres had to be skied per missed target.

== Cross-country skiing ==
Men

Event	Athlete	Race	
Event	Athlete	Time	Rank
15 km	Axel Lesser	DNF	–
15 km	Peter Thiel	52:07.8	37
15 km	Gert-Dietmar Klause	51:51.6	33
15 km	Gerhard Grimmer	51:22.1	29
30 km	Helmut Unger	1'44:47.9	37
30 km	Axel Lesser	1'44:16.2	36
30 km	Gert-Dietmar Klause	1'39:30.5	19
30 km	Gerhard Grimmer	1'38:46.0	15
50 km	Gert-Dietmar Klause	2'36:52.5	25

Men's 4 × 10 km relay

Athletes	Race	
Athletes	Time	Rank
Gerhard Grimmer; Axel Lesser; Peter Thiel; Gert-Dietmar Klause	2'19:22.8	7

Women

Event	Athlete	Race	
Event	Athlete	Time	Rank
5 km	Anni Unger	17:30.7	16
5 km	Renate Fischer-Köhler	17:25.5	14
5 km	Gudrun Schmidt	17:24.3	13
5 km	Christine Nestler	17:23.5	12
10 km	Anni Unger	40:36.8	22
10 km	Renate Fischer-Köhler	39:27.4	16
10 km	Gudrun Schmidt	39:22.8	14
10 km	Christine Nestler	39:07.9	9

Women's 3 x 5 km relay

Athletes	Race	
Athletes	Time	Rank
Renate Fischer-Köhler; Gudrun Schmidt; Christine Nestler	59:33.9	6

== Figure skating ==
Men

Athlete	CF	FS	Points	Places	Rank
Jan Hoffmann	26	25	1437.8	238	26
Günter Zöller	10	14	1727.9	100	11

Women

Athlete	CF	FS	Points	Places	Rank
Sonja Morgenstern	29	22	1475.9	251	28
Gabriele Seyfert	2	2	1882.3	18	2nd place, silver medalist(s)

Pairs

Athletes	SP	FS	Points	Places	Rank
Irine Müller; Hans-Georg Dallmer	9	8	289.4	82	9
Heidemarie Steiner; Heinz-Ulrich Walther	4	4	303.1	37	4

== Ice hockey ==
=== First round ===
East Germany - Norway 3:1 (2:1, 1:0, 0:0)
Goalscorers: Joachim Ziesche, Lothar Fuchs, Peter Prusa - Odd Syversen.

=== Final Round ===
Rank	Team	Pld	W	L	T	GF	GA	Pts
1	Soviet Union	7	6	1	0	48	10	12
2	Czechoslovakia	7	5	1	1	33	17	11
3	Canada	7	5	2	0	28	15	10
4	Sweden	7	4	2	1	23	18	9
5	Finland	7	3	3	1	17	23	7
6	United States	7	2	4	1	23	28	5
7	West Germany	7	1	6	0	13	39	2
8	East Germany	7	0	7	0	13	48	0

(Soviet Union) USSR – East Germany 9:0 (4:0, 2:0, 3:0)
Goalscorers: Firsov 3, Vikulov 2, Mišakov, Staršinov, Alexandrov, Zajcev.
Referees: Wycisk (POL), Johannessen (NOR)

Canada – East Germany 11:0 (4:0, 4:0, 3:0)
Goalscorers: Mott 4, Huck 2, Hargreaves, O’Shea, Bourbonnais, Monteith, H. Pinder.
Referees: Trumble (USA), Sillankorva (FIN)

Sweden – East Germany 5:2 (1:0, 2:1, 2:1)
Goalscorers: Hedlund 2, Wickberg, Lundström, Henriksson – Plotka, Fuchs.
Referees: Seglin (URS), Wycisk (POL)

Czechoslovakia – East Germany 10:3 (5:2, 1:0, 4:1)
Goalscorers: Horešovský 4, Nedomanský 2, Jiřík, Suchý, Kochta, Ševčík – Karrenbauer, Novy, Peters.
Referees: Dahlberg (SWE), Sillankorva (FIN)

East Germany – Finland 2:3 (1:2, 0:1, 1:0)
Goalscorers: R. Noack, Peters – Harju 2, Keinonen.
Referees: Bucala (TCH), Dahlberg (SWE)

East Germany – (United States) USA 4:6 (1:3, 1:1, 2:2)
Goalscorers: Fuchs 2, Karrenbauer 2 – Stordahl 2, P. Hurley 2, Volmar, Lilyholm.
Referees: Kubinec (CAN), Seglin (URS)

East Germany – West Germany 2:4 (0:1, 1:2, 1:1)
Goalscorers: Hiller, Fuchs – Funk, Waitl, Hanig, Lax.
Referees: McEvoy (CAN), Kořínek (TCH)

=== Contestants ===
8. EAST GERMANY
Goaltenders: Dieter Pürschel, Klaus Hirche.
Defence: Dieter Voigt, Manfred Buder, Helmut Novy, Dieter Kratzsch, Wolfgang Plotka, Wilfried Sock, Ulrich Noack.
Forwards: Bernd Karrenbauer, Hartmut Nickel, Lothar Fuchs, Peter Prusa, Joachim Ziesche, Bernd Poindl, Dietmar Peters, Bernd Hiller, Rüdiger Noack.
Coach: Rudi Schmieder.

== Luge ==
Men

Athlete	Run 1		Run 2		Run 3		Total	
Athlete	Time	Rank	Time	Rank	Time	Rank	Time	Rank
Wolfgang Scheidel	DSQ	–	–	–	–	–	DSQ	–
Klaus-Michael Bonsack	57.90	8	57.63	2	57.80	5	2:53.33	3rd place, bronze medalist(s)
Thomas Köhler	57.68	5	57.47	1	57.51	1	2:52.66	2nd place, silver medalist(s)
Horst Hörnlein	57.49	3	58.04	4	58.57	13	2:54.10	7

(Men's) Doubles

Athletes	Run 1		Run 2		Total	
Athletes	Time	Rank	Time	Rank	Time	Rank
Klaus-Michael Bonsack; Thomas Köhler	47.88	1	47.97	1	1:35.85	1st place, gold medalist(s)
Horst Hörnlein; Reinhard Bredow	48.80	5	49.01	6	1:37.81	5

Women

Athlete	Run 1		Run 2		Run 3		Total	
Athlete	Time	Rank	Time	Rank	Time	Rank	Time	Rank
Ortrun Enderlein	DSQ	–	–	–	–	–	DSQ	–
Anna-Maria Müller	DSQ	–	–	–	–	–	DSQ	–
Angela Knösel	DSQ	–	–	–	–	–	DSQ	–

== Nordic combined ==
Events:

- normal hill ski jumping (Three jumps, best two counted and shown here.)
- 15 km cross-country skiing

Athlete	Event	Ski Jumping				Cross-country			Total	
Athlete	Event	Distance 1	Distance 2	Points	Rank	Time	Points	Rank	Points	Rank
Roland Weißpflog	Individual	67.0	66.0	186.3	29	48:33.5	238.00	2	424.30	9
Karl-Heinz Luck	Individual	69.5	71.0	198.8	20	50:14.7	215.22	8	414.02	11
Andreas Kunz	Individual	72.5	74.0	216.9	10	49:19.8	227.20	3	444.10	3rd place, bronze medalist(s)

== Ski jumping ==
Athlete	Event	Jump 1		Jump 2		Total	
Athlete	Event	Distance	Points	Distance	Points	Points	Rank
Bernd Karwofsky	Normal hill	72.0	98.5	67.0 (fall)	53.0	151.5	54
Wolfgang Stöhr	Normal hill	73.5	101.4	71.0	97.9	199.3	20
Manfred Queck	Normal hill	75.5	104.1	72.5	101.3	205.4	14
Dieter Neuendorf	Normal hill	76.5	108.7	73.0	102.6	211.3	7
Dieter Neuendorf	Large hill	93.0	100.6	92.0	98.2	198.8	15
Manfred Queck	Large hill	96.5	104.0	98.5	108.8	212.8	4
Wolfgang Stöhr	Large hill	96.5	106.0	92.5	99.9	205.9	7

== Speed skating ==
Women

Event	Athlete	Race	
Event	Athlete	Time	Rank
500 m	Ruth Budzisch-Schleiermacher	47.8	16
1000 m	Ruth Budzisch-Schleiermacher	1:35.6	12
1500 m	Ruth Budzisch-Schleiermacher	2:27.1	8
