= List of Olympic ice hockey players for East Germany =

The list of Olympic ice hockey players for East Germany consists of 16 skaters and 2 goaltenders. Men's ice hockey tournaments have been staged at the Olympic Games since 1920 (it was introduced at the 1920 Summer Olympics, and was permanently added to the Winter Olympic Games in 1924). East Germany participated in one tournament during its existence: the 1968 Winter Olympics, where they finished eighth of the fourteen nations competing.

Lothar Fuchs had the most goals (5), while Dietmar Peters had the most assists (5) and points (7)

== Key ==
General terms
Term	Definition
GP	Games played
Ref(s)	Reference(s)

Goaltender statistical abbreviations
Abbreviation	Definition
W	Wins
L	Losses
T	Ties
Min	Minutes played
SO	Shutouts
GA	Goals against
GAA	Goals against average

Skater statistical abbreviations
Abbreviation	Definition
G	Goals
A	Assists
P	Points
PIM	Penalty minutes

== Goaltenders ==
Goaltenders
Player	GP	W	L	T	Min	SO	GA	GAA	Ref(s)
Klaus Hirche	–	–	–	–	–	–	–	–	
Dieter Pürschel	–	–	–	–	–	–	–	–	

== Skaters ==
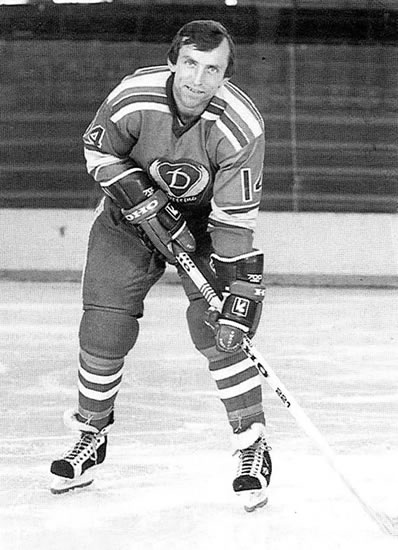
Dietmar Peters led East Germany for total assists (5) and points (7).

Skaters
Player	GP	G	A	P	PIM	Ref(s)
Manfred Buder	7	0	0	0	2	
Lothar Fuchs	8	5	0	5	2	
Bernd Hiller	7	1	0	1	0	
Bernd Karrenbauer	7	3	2	5	0	
Dieter Kratzsch	6	0	0	0	2	
Hartmut Nickel	7	0	0	0	2	
Rüdiger Noack	7	1	2	3	2	
Ulrich Noack	1	0	0	0	2	
Helmut Novy	7	1	0	1	6	
Dietmar Peters	8	2	5	7	7	
Wolfgang Plotka	7	1	1	2	4	
Bernd Poindl	7	0	0	0	0	
Peter Prusa	8	1	0	1	2	
Wilfried Sock	7	0	0	0	6	
Dieter Voigt	7	0	0	0	6	
Joachim Ziesche	8	1	0	1	6	

== See also ==
- East Germany national ice hockey team
