= Noack =

Noack is a German surname of Sorbian origin. It is a spelling variant of the surname Noak, which is itself a variant of Nowak; nowak ("newcomer") was a nickname for a new citizen or for someone who has recently moved to a town or village. There are 8070 people surnamed Noack in Germany, mostly in the Sorbian settlement area. The surname is attested as early as 1648, with a mention of a Hans Noack in Lübben.

Notable people with the surname include:

- Angelika Noack (born 1952), German rower
- Astrid Noack (1888–1954), Danish sculptor
- Axel Noack (born 1961), German former racewalker
- Barbara Noack (1924–2022), German writer
- Belinda Noack (born 1977), Australian cricketer
- Bernd Noack (born 1966), German scientist
- Claudia Noack (born 1961), German rower
- Eddie Noack (1930–1978), American country-western singer
- Errol Noack (1945–1966), Australian soldier killed in the Vietnam War
- Erwin Noack (1940–2006), German artist and musician
- Friedrich Noack (1858–1930), German cultural historian and writer
- Günther Noack (1912–1991), German figure skater
- Harald Noack (born 1945), German politician in Lower Saxony
- Harald Noack (born 1949), German politician in Hesse and North Rhine-Westphalia
- Ingrid Noack (born 1982), Australian cricketer
- John Noack (born 1944), Australian rules footballer
- Karl Gustav Herbert Noack, the birth name of German composer Jim Cowler (1898–1964)
- Kurt Noack (1893–1945), German composer
- Lothar Noack (born 1953), German swimmer
- Marianne Noack (born 1951), German gymnast
- Neele Eckhardt-Noack (born 1992), German triple jumper
- Rudolf Noack (1913–1947), German footballer
- Rüdiger Noack (born 1944), German ice hockey player
- Ruth Noack (born 1964), German curator and art historian
- Sebastian Noack (born 1969), German baritone
- Ulrich Noack (born 1942), German ice hockey player
- Ursula Noack (1918–1988), German cabaret artiste, actress, and singer
- Ute Noack (born 1961), East German cross-country skier
- Ute Noack (swimmer) (born 1943), German butterfly swimmer

== See also ==
- Hermann Noack, German art foundry
- Noack Organ Company, American pipe organ manufacturer
- Noack volatility test
