= Ningali =

Ningali may refer to:

- Ningali Cullen (1942–2012), Aboriginal activist
- Ningali Lawford (1967–2019), Australian actress
