= Noak =

Noak may refer to:

- Noak Bridge, settlement near Basildon, Essex, England
- Noak Hill, village in the London Borough of Havering
- Gubben Noak, traditional Swedish song, drinking song and bible travesty
- Larsson–Noak Historic District, Maine, United States
- NOAK, an acronym for Nth of a kind, as opposed to FOAK, first of a kind

== People with the surname ==
- Alexander Noak (born 1978), German politician
- Jürgen Noak (fl. 1960s), East German slalom canoeist
- Karl-Heinz Noak (1916–1978), highly decorated Major in the Wehrmacht during World War II

== See also ==
- Noack
- Notak
- Novak
