= Graul =

Graul is a surname. Notable people with this surname include:

- Barry Graul, part of the American musical band MercyMe
- Elta Danneel Graul (born 1979), American actress
- Jean Graul (1924–2015), Swiss sailor
- Karl Graul (1814–1864), German missionary
- Richard Graul (1862–1944), German art historian and museum curator
- Thomas Graul (born 1962), German ice hockey player
- William L. Graul (1846–1909), American soldier
- Volker Graul (1952–2022), German football player
