= Concordia College (South Australia) =

Independent Lutheran school in Adelaide, South Australia, Australia

- Extraordinary.

Location
- Adelaide, South Australia; Australia; 34.959785°S 138.617618°E

Information
- Type: Independent Lutheran school
- Motto: Fortiter In Re, Suaviter In Modo (Firm In Principle, Gentle In Manner)
- Religious affiliation: Lutheran Church of Australia
- Established: 1890
- Chairperson: Loyd R. Fyffe
- Head of College: Paul Weinert
- Staff: 342
- Years offered: ELC–12
- Gender: Co-educational
- Enrolment: 1,236 (2020)
- Campuses: Concordia; St John's; St Peters
- Houses: Cheltenham; Highgate; Malvern; Winchester
- Colours: Blue and gold
- Slogan: Extraordinary.
- Newspaper: Concordia Connect
- Yearbook: The Review
- Affiliation: Sports Association for Adelaide Schools; Independent Girls Schools Sports Association
- Alumni: Old Concordians
- Website: www.concordia.sa.edu.au

Concordia College (CC) is an ELC–12 independent, co-educational, Lutheran school with campuses located in the Highgate and Blackwood areas of Adelaide, South Australia. Established in 1890, the college is a school of the Lutheran Church of Australia and has been an International Baccalaureate (IB) World School since January 2001, offering the IB Primary Years and Middle Years Programmes.

== History ==
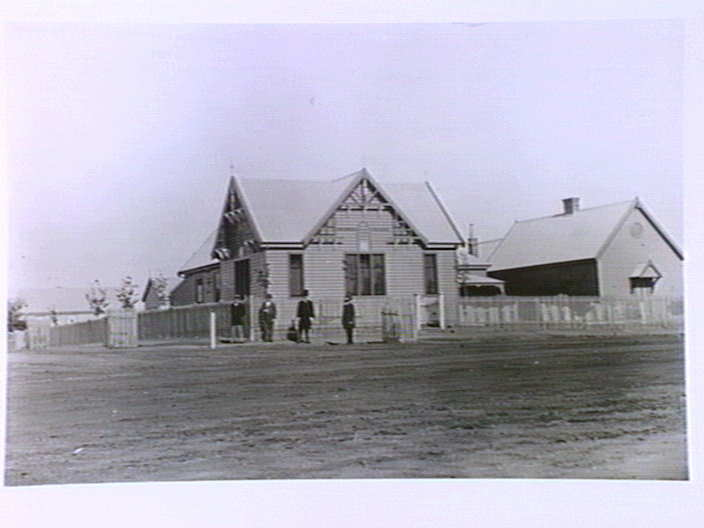
Concordia College at Murtoa, c.1890s

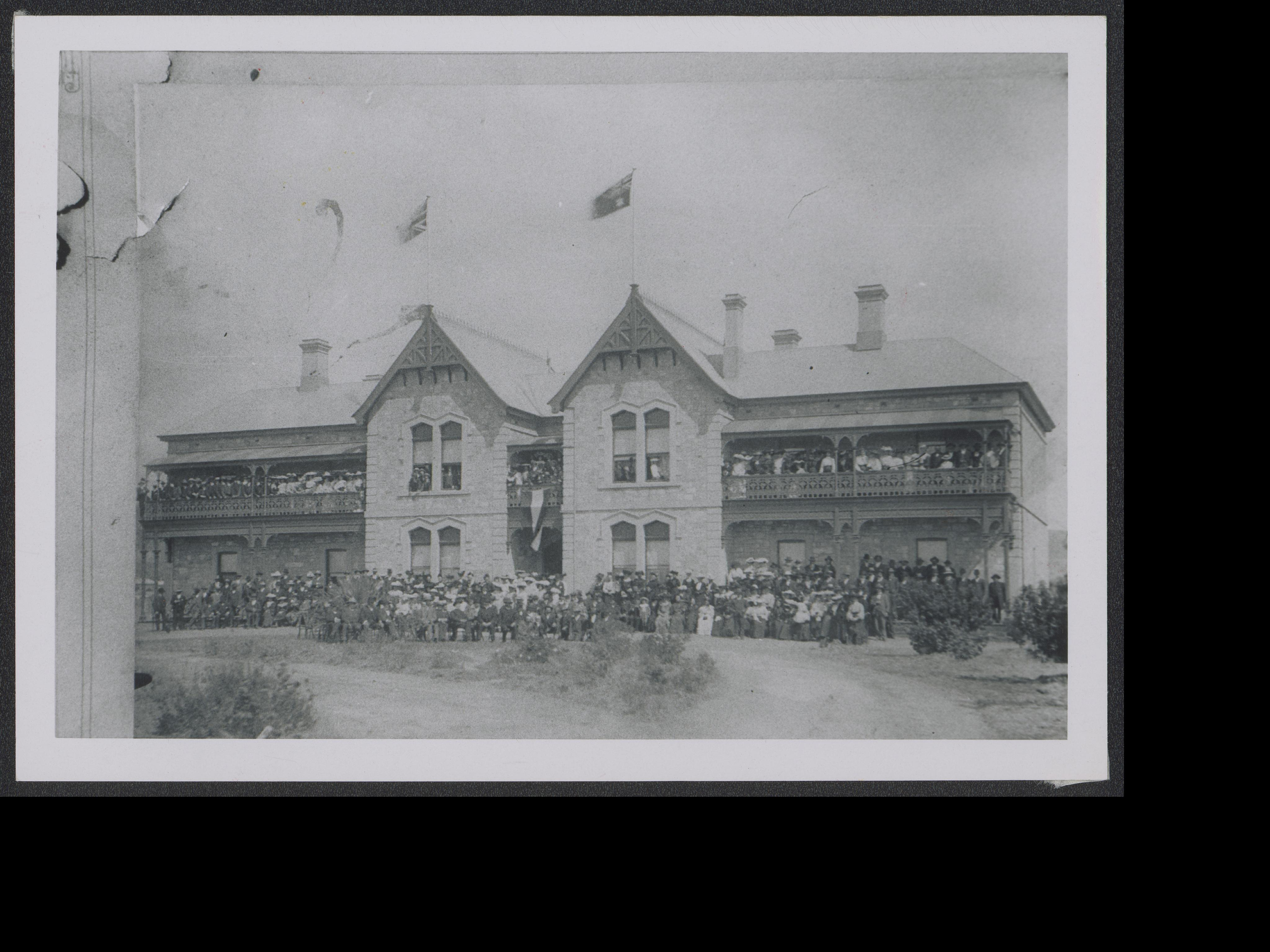
The college at Highgate on opening day, 1905

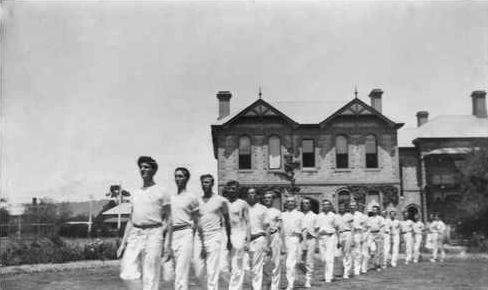
Gymnasium team in front of the main building, c.1921

Concordia College was founded by W. F. Peters, a Lutheran pastor in the Victorian country township of Murtoa. Peters purchased a private school founded in 1887 by T. W. Boehm, and re-established it in 1890 as a boys' college and training ground for future pastors and teachers. Lutheran leaders in South Australia moved the college to its present Highgate site in 1905.

In 2016, Concordia College amalgamated with the neighbouring St John's Lutheran School to form an ELC to Year 12 college, which was followed by a further amalgamation with St Peters Lutheran School at Blackwood in 2023. As a three-campus college, leadership restructuring between 2021 and 2023 led to the creation of a new role, "Head of College", that holds responsibility across all three campuses of the college.

== Campus and Facilities ==
Concordia is located on three campuses across Adelaide: Concordia and St John's Campuses are situated in suburban Highgate, south of the Adelaide CBD, while St Peters Campus is located in the foothills of Adelaide in Blackwood. The Concordia Campus offers education for students in Years 7 to 12, while the St John's and St Peters Campuses both remain as Early Learning to Year 6 schools.

The Concordia Campus includes:

- Concordia College Chapel: The Chapel features a waterfall and fountain visible through a glass wall behind the altar, and a cross with a crown of thorns. The facility doubles as an assembly hall and a performance venue.
- The Suaviter: Named from the school motto, the Suaviter is one of the original school buildings, and was formerly the chapel. Retaining its stained glass windows, it has been converted into a conference and exhibition/display centre with catering facilities, where students participating in the hospitality curriculum receive training.
- The Yangadlitya Resource Centre was opened on 29 May 2006 by Ningali Cullen, one of the first female indigenous Concordia College students (class of 1954). The college was given permission to use the name "Yangadlitya" (meaning "for the future") by the elders of the Kaurna people, who are the traditional custodians of the land on which Concordia stands.
- Murtoa: Named after the town Murtoa, Victoria, the original location of the school, and built in 2010, this building includes a television studio and media-editing suite as well as several multipurpose classrooms. The music centre has been expanded into the building featuring new practice rooms. Built by Sarah Constructions, it features a design similar to the Yangadlitya building, including a skybridge connecting the two.
- The Hamann Wing: The original building of Malvern College purchased by Concordia for the relocation to Adelaide. Later renamed after former headmaster Professor H.P.A. Hamann, it is a heritage listed building.
- Named after the college motto "Fortiter in Re, Suaviter in Modo," Fortiter was opened by Her Excellency the Honourable Frances Adamson AC, the 36th Governor of South Australia, in September 2023. As an ELC–12 gymnasium, this multipurpose facility includes two large courts, a weights room, changing rooms, various classrooms, administrative and function spaces, kitchen facilities, and a large foyer area. The gymnasium can also be converted into an events venue for services, functions, and other significant events at the college.
- The Tech Centre: Facilities for woodworking, metalworking, plastics and electronics.
- The Former Gymnasium: A large gym area (used for basketball, netball, volleyball, etc.) with a weights room, classroom, changing rooms, administrative facilities, and foyer.
- The Atrium (formerly Maths Centre): Senior classrooms.
- The Nautilus Centre: Opened by Hieu Van Le AC, 35th Governor of South Australia in 2017, the science building includes laboratories, classrooms and associated offices. The Nautilus Centre features a swinging pendulum which was purchased by the Ajaero family.
- The Peter Schmidt Music Centre: Practice rooms, a computer room and an ensemble room. Named after former Head of Music, Peter Schmidt
- The Drama Centre: Originally the school gym, it is now a performance area with lights, sound and video facilities.
- The Concordia Cafe: An externally managed business from which students can purchase food and drink items at recess and lunch.

== Curriculum ==
=== Primary School and Early Years Learning ===
Inquiry-based learning in the Early Learning Centres follows the Early Years Learning Framework and International Baccalaureate Primary Years Programme (IB PYP). All programs within the Early Years are underpinned by the Reggio Emilia Philosophy, in which children have opportunities to participate in structured programs that promote experiential and play-based learning experiences in a constructivist and relationship-centred environment.

The Primary School Curriculum in Reception to Year 6 follows the International Baccalaureate Primary Years Programme (IB PYP), where students engage in pastoral care programs and have opportunities to participate in various co-curricular activities.

=== Middle and Senior School ===
The Middle School Curriculum in Years 7–10 incorporates the International Baccalaureate Middle Years Programme (IB MYP). Students in years 7 and 8 undertake a common course, except in 'Language B', where they choose from German or Chinese. An after-hours Special Interest Music Program is available to selected students in Year 8. Students in Years 9 and 10 are able to make subject choices in The Arts and Technology learning areas.

Years 11 & 12, students are taught per the curriculum of the South Australian Certificate of Education (SACE). The IB Diploma Programme was offered as an alternative until 2022 when it was terminated due to lack of interest. Students in the Middle and Senior Schools also have various opportunities to pursue VET courses and interests beyond the traditional school setting.

=== Music ===
Concordia College offers an extensive music program from Reception to Year 12 which encourages students to learn musical instruments and participate in ensembles, band groups, choirs and more. Groups include a range of Concert Bands, Big Bands, String and Percussion Ensembles, Wind Ensembles, Senior and Jazz Choirs and String Quartets. These ensembles perform in a number of services, concerts and other performances, both internally and externally throughout the school year. Concordia's music program has seen a number of ensemble groups participate in ABODA, Generations In Jazz (GIJ) as well as interstate and overseas performances.

=== Arts and Design ===
Students at Concordia College also have opportunities to engage in a range of comprehensive arts and design programs. Subjects offered within these areas include Visual Art, Art Design, Design, Technology and Engineering, Food Design, Media, Photography and Digital Technologies.

== Co-Curriculum ==
Co-curricular programs and activities offered include national subject competitions, career counselling and work experience, excursions, field camps and instrumental music tuition. Other extra-curricular programs include Choirs such as the Testosterphones, 7/8, Senior, McKenzie Jazz, Prelude Jazz, and Mattson Jazz choirs, the annual College musical, Big Bands, School Orchestra, Concert Band, Music Ensembles (Wind, String, Percussion), Chapel music, Chess Club, Debating, Duke of Edinburgh's Award, Pedal Prix, Ski Trip, Pokémon club, Drama club, Backgammon club, Tech club, and House competitions.

=== Student Leadership ===
Students from any year level may participate in the College Student Forum (a Student Representative Council) and students in Year 12 may become a School Captain, Deputy School Captain, Student Leader, or House Captain. Students may also volunteer for respective leadership roles in their year level, such as, Middle School Leader in Year 9, Peer Support Leader in Year 11 and Action Leader in Year 12.

=== Musicals ===
Concordia students may participate in the annual College musical. The musicals were performed at the Scott Theatre. Until 2009, they moved to the Hopgood Theatre for the musical Grease. The Sound of Music in April 2014 was the first Concordia musical to be held in the College Chapel. While Godspell was also held in the chapel, the 2016 performance of Hairspray was once again in the Hopgood Theatre. The performances are generally held in March or April. A long-established tradition, these musicals are a showcase of the music and drama departments. In 2020, all performances of the College Musical were cancelled due to the COVID-19 pandemic, but a performance in the College Chapel without an audience was filmed. After COVID, Concordia College musicals then returned to the Hopgood Theatre until it closed for renovations in late 2023. Since then, all College musicals have taken place at the Futures Church campus in Paradise. Musicals presented have included:

Year	Musical
2026	Shrek
2025	Mamma Mia!
2024	Chicago High School Edition
2023	All Shook Up
2022	Oliver!
2021	Beauty and the Beast
2020	High School Musical
2019	The Addams Family
2018	Legally Blonde
2017	Annie
2016	Hairspray
2015	Godspell
2014	The Sound of Music
2013	Guys and Dolls
2012	Aladdin
2011	The Wizard of Oz
2010	Grease
2009	Children of Eden
2008	Oklahoma!
2007	Beauty and the Beast
2006	Cabaret
2005	Les Misérables
2004	Viva Mexico
2003	Little Shop of Horrors
2002	The Mikado
2001	Godspell
2000	42nd Street
1999	The Wizard of Oz
1998	Guys and Dolls
1997	Me and My Girl

Others in previous years have included: L'il Abner, Carousel, My Fair Lady, Annie Get Your Gun, The Boy Friend, Fiddler on the Roof, The Pirates of Penzance, Calamity Jane, Viva Mexico, Ruddigore, HMS Pinafore, Can You Imagine, Free As Air, A Penny For a Song, God So Loved, Where Is God, Anything Goes, Tom Sawyer, Salad Days, and Trial By Jury.

=== Sport ===
Concordia College is a member of the Sports Association for Adelaide Schools (SAAS), and the Independent Girls Schools Sports Association (IGSSA). The sports offered at the college include: basketball, cricket, cross country, football, hockey, netball, soccer, softball, swimming, tennis and volleyball. Students also have the opportunity to participate in:

- Knockout Competitions – the college enters teams in statewide competitions in sports such as basketball, netball and volleyball.
- Sports Day – a whole school athletics event, held annually in March at the Santos Stadium with a focus on participation.
- Interschool Athletics SSSSA – (combined boys/girls) in Term 1; Achilles Cup (Boys) and IGSSA (Girls) competition in Term 3.
- Swimming Carnival – a school event for Years 7–11, held in the last week of the school year at Unley Swimming Centre.
- Interschool Swimming Carnivals – organised by SSSSA (combined boys/girls) and IGSSA (girls only)
- House Sport – Lunchtime netball, volleyball, and chess for which students may earn house points
- Interschool Chess – the college participates in inter-school chess through the South Australian Junior Chess League

==== IGSSA Premierships ====
Concordia College has won the following IGSSA premierships.

- Football – 2019
- Volleyball (6) – 2012, 2013, 2015, 2018, 2019, 2020

== House system ==
As with most Australian schools, Concordia College utilises a house system. There are currently four houses, three named after three of the streets surrounding the college and the fourth, Malvern after the neighbouring suburb.

House	Colour	Moniker
Cheltenham	Green	The Cheltenham Army
Highgate	Blue	The Highgate Heroes
Malvern	Yellow	The Malvern Lions
Winchester	Red	The Winchester Warriors

Students represent their house in a number of activities, including Sports Day, Swimming Carnival and lunchtime house sports. Students earn points for their house through participation in these activities, and the house with the most points at the conclusion of the school year is awarded the House Shield.

== Notable alumni ==
=== The Arts ===
- Odette England, Contemporary artist and photographer
- Ernest George Moll, Australian poet
- Ron Nagorcka, Contemporary composer, didjeridu and keyboard player
- Kayla Itsines, Personal trainer, entrepreneur, and author

=== Military ===
- Errol Noack, first Australian National Service conscript to be killed in the Vietnam War

=== Politics ===
- Luci Blackborough, council member for Campbelltown, youngest councillor in South Australian history
- Ryan Harrison, Labor Candidate for Unley in the 2022 and 2026 South Australian state elections

=== Sport ===
- James Aish, former Australian rules footballer for Fremantle, Brisbane Lions and Collingwood
- Cameron Bayly, Cyclist for OCBC Singapore Cycling Team and Search2Retain Cycling Team
- Connor Fearon, Cyclist for Kona Gravity / Enduro Team
- Lat Mayen, basketball player
- Lewis Young, Australian rules footballer for Western Bulldogs and Carlton
- John Noack, former Australian rules footballer for Sturt and Geelong
- Mason Redman, Australian rules footballer for Essendon
- Jay Schulz, former Australian rules footballer for Port Adelaide and Richmond
- Vern Schuppan, Motor racing driver

== Associated people ==
- Agnes Marie Johanna Dorsch, teacher
- Carl Friedrich Graebner, headmaster 1905–1939

== See also ==
- List of schools in South Australia
- List of Lutheran schools in Australia
