= Wolfgang Plotka =

German ice hockey player

- Born: 16 May 1941 (age 83); Berlin, Nazi Germany
- Height: 5 ft 8 in (173 cm)
- Weight: 170 lb (77 kg; 12 st 2 lb)
- Played for: SC Dynamo Berlin
- National team: East Germany
- NHL draft: Undrafted
- Playing career: ?–?

Medal record

Men's ice hockey

Representing East Germany

European Championships
| Bronze medal – third place | 1966 Ljubljana | Team |

Wolfgang Plotka (born 16 May 1941) is a German ice hockey player, who competed for SC Dynamo Berlin. He won the bronze medal playing for the East Germany national ice hockey team at the 1966 European Championships.

Plotka also competed for East Germany at the 1968 Winter Olympics in Grenoble, scoring one goal and one assist in seven games played.
