= Myrtle Rose White =

Australian author (1888–1961)

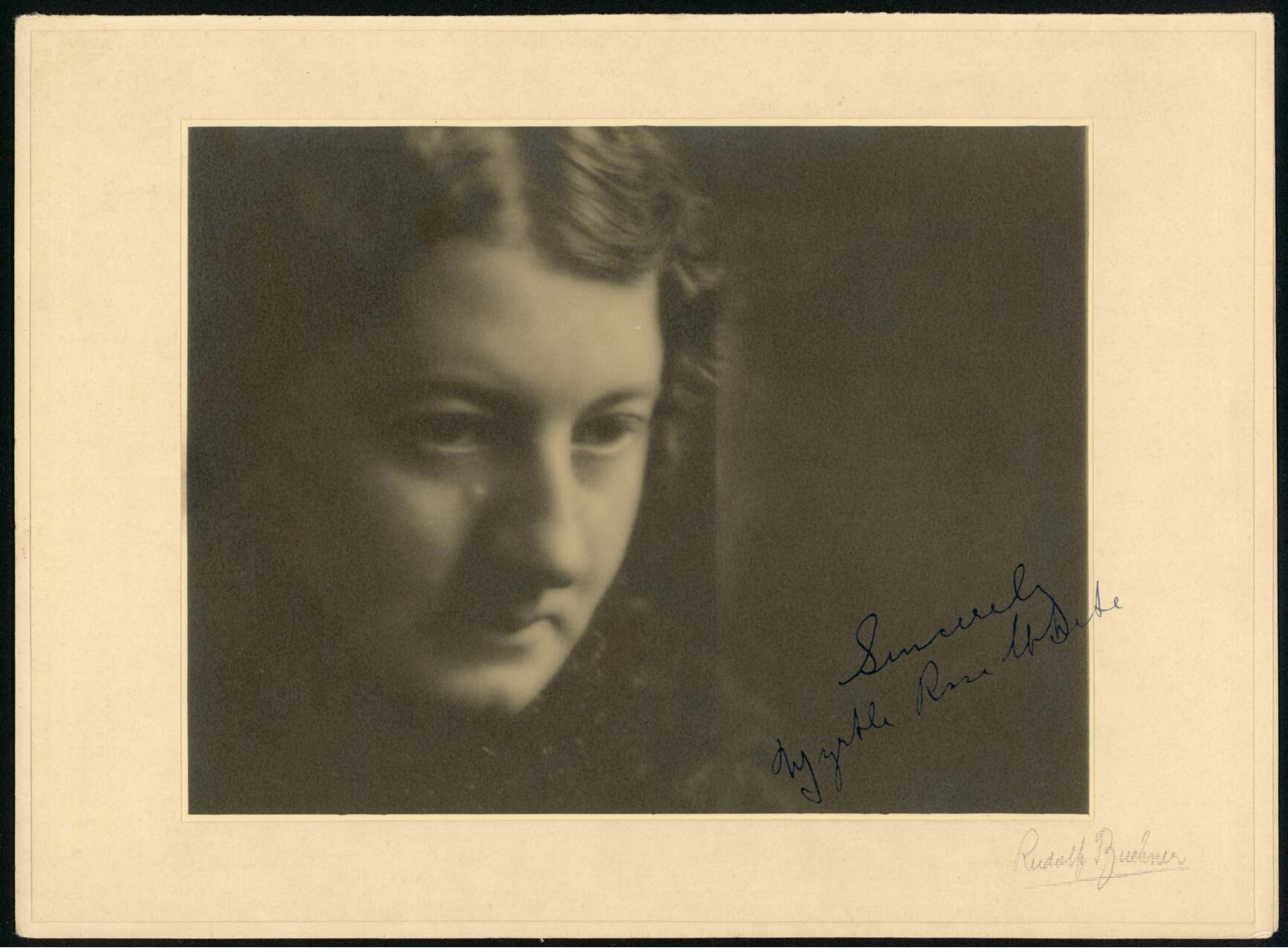
- Signed photograph of Myrtle Rose White (undated)
- Born: Myrtle Rose Kennewell; 30 August 1888; Broken Hill, New South Wales, Australia
- Died: 11 July 1961 (aged 72); Port Hedland, Western Australia
- Notable works: No Roads Go By

Myrtle Rose White (1888–1961) was an Australian novelist. She is best known for No Roads Go By, a work of autobiographical fiction.

== Life ==
Myrtle Rose White was the third child of Dina Ann (née Adams) and miner Mark Albert Kennewell. She was born in a tent near Broken Hill, New South Wales on 30 August 1888. She grew up in South Australia's Barossa Valley. Her education was sporadic before she attended a private school in Williamstown, South Australia.

Following her marriage in 1910 to Cornelius White, known as Con, the couple moved to Lake Elder in South Australia, where he managed a rural property. This later served as the setting for her first book, which was favourably compared with Mrs Aeneas Gunn's We of the Never Never. Originally published in 1932, a new edition was released by Angus & Robertson in 1954, incorporating illustrations by Elizabeth Durack.

== Personal ==
White's husband Con died in Adelaide in 1940 and was buried in Centennial Park Cemetery. White died on 11 July 1961 while visiting her son, Alan, at Port Hedland, Western Australia. Her body was cremated in Perth and her ashes interred as she wished, part in Centennial Park Cemetery and part at Wonnaminta Station, outside Broken Hill.

== Selected works ==
- White, Myrtle Rose (1932). No roads go by. Rigby.
- ——— (1933). For those that love it. Angus & Robertson.
- ——— (1961). From that day to this. Rigby.
- ——— (1955). Beyond the western rivers. Angus and Robertson.
