= Dieter Voigt =

German ice hockey player

- Born: 18 February 1939 (age 86); Geising, Saxony, Germany
- Height: 5 ft 10 in (178 cm)
- Weight: 176 lb (80 kg; 12 st 8 lb)
- Played for: SC Dynamo Berlin
- National team: East Germany
- NHL draft: Undrafted
- Playing career: ?–?

Medal record

Men's ice hockey

Representing East Germany

European Championships
Bronze medal – third place	1966 Ljubljana	Team

Dieter Voigt (born 18 February 1939) is a German ice hockey player, who competed for SC Dynamo Berlin. He won the bronze medal with the East German national ice hockey team at the 1966 European Championships. Voigt also competed for East Germany at the 1968 Winter Olympics in Grenoble.
