= Thomas Graul =

German ice hockey player

- Born: March 15, 1962 (age 63); Berlin, Germany
- Height: 5 ft 8 in (173 cm)
- Weight: 168 lb (76 kg; 12 st 0 lb)
- Shot: Left
- Played for: DEL; Eisbären Berlin
- National team: East Germany
- NHL draft: Undrafted
- Playing career: 1981–2005

Thomas Graul (born March 15, 1962) is a German former professional ice hockey player.

Graul competed at both the 1983 and 1985 World Ice Hockey Championships as a member of the East German team.
