= Bito =

German company

bito AG
- Type: Aktiengesellschaft
- Industry: Trade
- Founded: 1966
- Headquarters: Berlin, Germany
- Key people: Joachim Spitzley (CEO and chairman of the managing board), Kristina Spitzley(Chairman of the supervisory board)
- Website: www.bito-ag.de

bito AG is a German-incorporated company based in Berlin. It was first a wholesaler, and later a manufacturer, of industrial paints and finishes.

== History ==
The company was founded in Berlin in 1966 by Rudolf Spitzley as a wholesale trader for industrial paint, pigment, colours and lacquer-varnish. Co-founders were Hans-Peter Haas and Gunther Wirth. In 1989, bito took over Wilhelm Detel GmbH in Uelzen. Today, the company owns branches in Eberswalde, Heinersdorf, Potsdam, Spandau and Hamburg. bito went public in 1999 under Joachim Spitzley, the founder's son.

In 2009, bito shifted from wholesale to production with a focus on research of colours and lacquer-varnishes. One major innovation of the company was the introduction of a green deposit system for containers and the use of recycled containers making Bito a pioneer of green chemical engineering and wholesale in Germany.

== Sponsorship and charity ==
bito is a supporter of Berlin's local ice hockey team Die Eisbären Berlin and of Robert Harting, the former Olympic, World, and European champion in the men's discus throw, and local small business as well as artists. Joachim Spitzley founded the Initiative Made in Berlin a network to support regional trade and commerce.
