= Thirsty Moon =

German Krautrock band

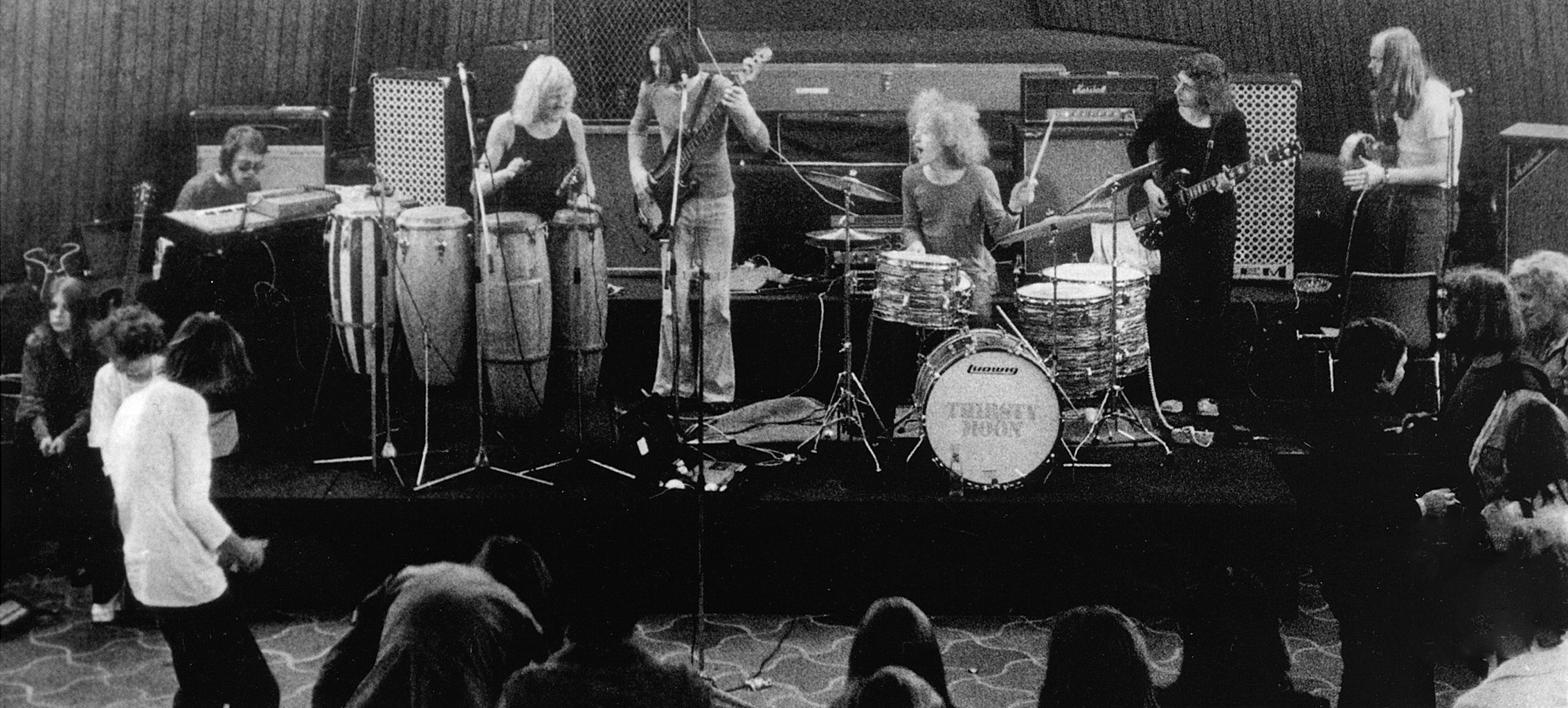
- Thirsty Moon, 1976.

Background information
- Origin: Bremen, Bremen, Germany
- Genres: Progressive rock, krautrock, jazz-rock, jazz fusion
- Years active: 1971–present
- Labels: Brain, Sky
- Members: Norbert Drogies; Michael Kobs; Willi Pape; Harald Konietzko; Jürgen Drogies; Hans-Werner Ranwig
- Past members: Erwin Noack (deceased); Siegfried Pisalla; Gerd Lueken; Heinz Sander; Rainer Neumann; Serge Weber; Junior Weerasinghe; Uli Harmssen
- Website: www.thirstymoon.de

Thirsty Moon is a German Krautrock band. The band was founded in the early 1970s in Bremen and plays progressive rock with strong jazz influences. Band members included the brothers Jürgen and Norbert Drogies, Michael Kobs, Harald Konietzko, Erwin Noack, Willi Pape and Siegfried Pisalla, although this line-up changed in the late 1970s. The band's first two albums received critical acclaim and are considered Krautrock classics.

In 2007, Jürgen Drogies released the album Dreamcatcher and gave his new band the name Back to the Moon.

== Band members ==
- Norbert Drogies - drums
- Michael Kobs - electric piano, organ
- Erwin Noack - congas, percussion
- Willi Pape - saxophone
- Harald Konietzko - bass, guitar, vocals, cello
- Jürgen Drogies - guitar, percussion
- Hans Werner Ranwig - organ, vocals
- Siegfried Pisalla - vocals, guitar

Later members:

- Rainer Neumann - saxophone
- Serge Weber - piano, synthesizer
- Junior Weerasinghe - drums, vocals

== Discography ==
Thirsty Moon

- 1972 Thirsty Moon
- 1974 You'll Never Come Back
- 1975 Blitz
- 1976 A Real Good Time
- 1981 Starchaser
- 2006 I'll Be Back - Live '75 (first released 2006 LongHair LHC 55)
- 2007 Dreamcatcher by Back to the Moon (SynGate 2111)
- 2011 Lunar Eclipse - Live at Stagge's Hotel 1976

Back to the Moon

- 2007 Dreamcatcher
- 2010 Street view
- 2010 Wave and smile (EP)
- 2014 3
