= Mason Redman =

Australian rules footballer

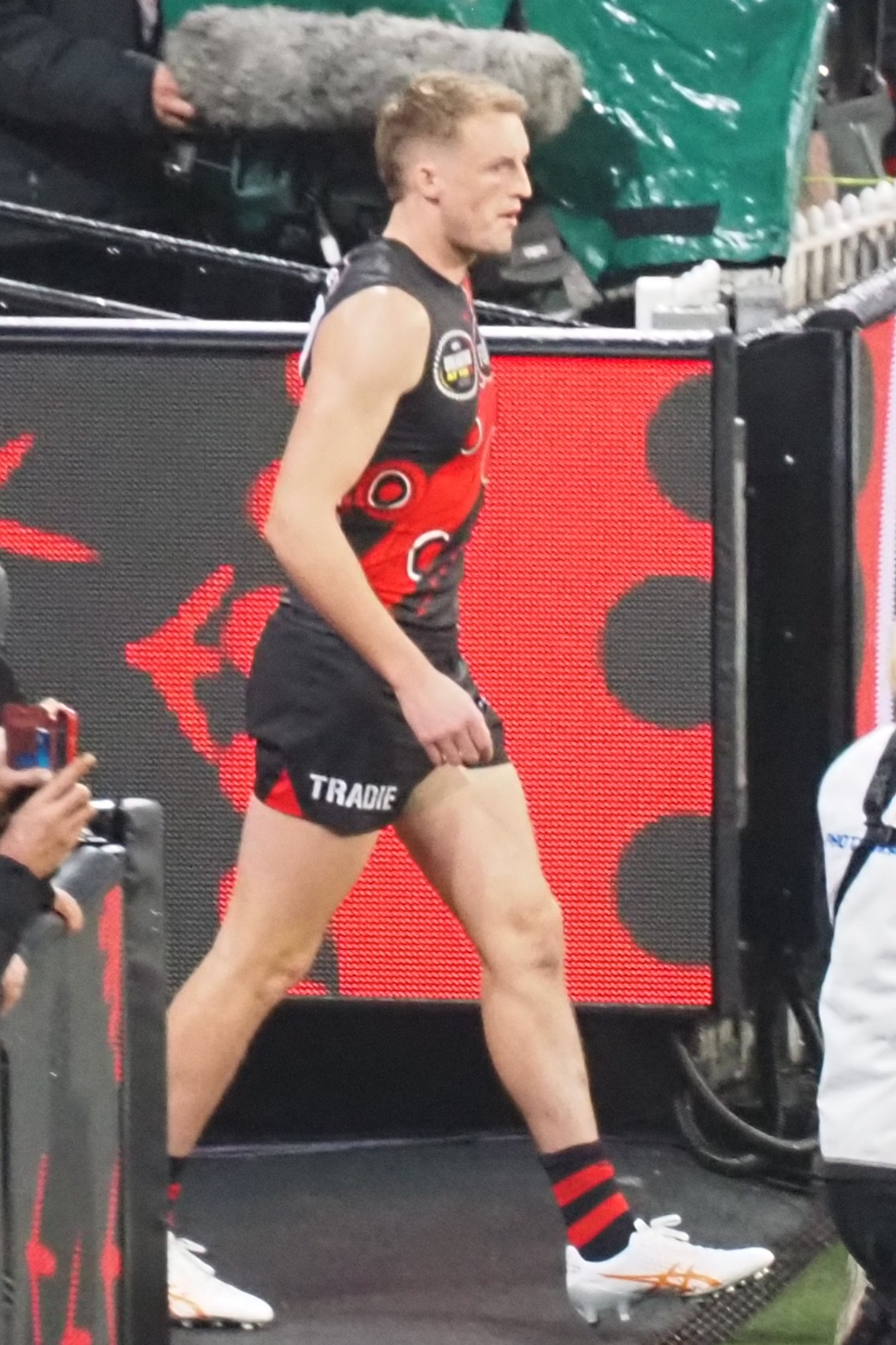
- Redman pre-match with Essendon in 2025

Personal information
- Full name: Mason Redman
- Nicknames: Red Dog, Samson, Captain, Horse
- Born: 26 August 1997 (age 29); Millicent, South Australia
- Original team: Glenelg (SANFL)
- Draft: No. 30, 2015 national draft
- Debut: Round 7, 2016, Essendon vs. Sydney, at SCG
- Height: 187 cm (6 ft 2 in)
- Weight: 87 kg (192 lb)
- Position: Defender

Club information
- Current club: Essendon
- Number: 27

Playing career^{1}
Years	Club	Games (Goals)
2016–	Essendon	157 (27)
- ^{1} Playing statistics correct to the end of round 22, 2026.

Mason Redman (born 26 August 1997) is a professional Australian rules footballer for the Essendon Football Club in the Australian Football League (AFL).

Redman grew up in Millicent, South Australia, the son of a lobster fisherman. He played junior football for Millicent in the Western Border Football League, making his debut for the A Grade at 15. Redman was included in Glenelg's South East talent squads and moved to Adelaide in 2015 to achieve his dream of playing in the AFL. He moved in with his Aunt at Highgate and joined Concordia College so that school football wouldn't interfere with his Glenelg commitments.

Redman started 2015 in the under 18s for Glenelg, then played for South Australia in the AFL Under 18 Championships. He then played reserves for Glenelg and two senior South Australian National Football League games.

He was recruited by the Essendon Football Club with pick 30 overall in the 2015 national draft. He made his debut in the eighty-one point loss against the Sydney Swans at the Sydney Cricket Ground in round 7 of the 2016 AFL season.

After becoming a regular running defender in the Essendon side in 2021, Redman kicked several goals from outside 50m usually followed by his unique "Hellboy" celebration.

Having become an important player for Essendon across 2021 to 2023, Redman rejected free agency and a substantial offer from Adelaide to sign a long-term extension with the Bombers. He was selected in the initial 44 man All Australian squad but missed selection in the final 22 man team.

== Statistics ==
Updated to the end of round 22, 2026.

Legend
G	Goals	K	Kicks	D	Disposals	T	Tackles
B	Behinds	H	Handballs	M	Marks

Season	Team	No.	Games	Totals							Averages (per game)							Votes
Season	Team	No.	Games	G	B	K	H	D	M	T	G	B	K	H	D	M	T	Votes
2016	Essendon	27	3	1	2	10	9	19	7	8	0.3	0.7	3.3	3.0	6.3	2.3	2.7	0
2017	Essendon	27	0	—	—	—	—	—	—	—	—	—	—	—	—	—	—	0
2018	Essendon	27	2	0	0	25	16	41	15	4	0.0	0.0	12.5	8.0	20.5	7.5	2.0	0
2019	Essendon	27	20	0	2	231	109	340	89	61	0.0	0.1	11.6	5.5	17.0	4.5	3.1	0
2020 (Note: The 2020 season was played with 17 home-and-away matches per team (down from 22) and 16-minute quarters with time on (down from 20-minute quarters with time on) due to the impact of the COVID-19 pandemic.)	Essendon	27	13	1	1	94	63	157	41	22	0.1	0.1	7.2	4.8	12.1	3.2	1.7	0
2021	Essendon	27	22	6	2	245	142	387	101	44	0.3	0.1	11.1	6.5	17.6	4.6	2.0	1
2022	Essendon	27	20	3	6	312	112	424	124	44	0.2	0.3	15.6	5.6	21.2	6.2	2.2	5
2023	Essendon	27	23	7	5	380	124	504	138	43	0.3	0.2	16.5	5.4	21.9	6.0	1.9	1
2024	Essendon	27	21	2	4	339	104	443	127	35	0.1	0.2	16.1	5.0	21.1	6.0	1.7	0
2025	Essendon	27	19	4	6	324	111	435	100	35	0.2	0.3	17.1	5.8	22.9	5.3	1.8	2
2026	Essendon	27	14	3	4	188	64	252	73	21	0.2	0.3	13.4	4.6	18.0	5.2	1.5	0
Career			157	27	32	2148	854	3002	815	317	0.2	0.2	13.7	5.4	19.1	5.2	2.0	9
