= Centennial Park Cemetery =

Cemetery in Adelaide, South Australia

- Interactive map of Centennial Park Cemetery

Details
- Established: 1936
- Location: Pasadena, Adelaide, South Australia
- Country: Australia
- Coordinates: 34.9973°S 138.5881°E
- Type: Public
- Owned by: Cities of Mitcham and Unley
- Size: 40.5 ha (100 acres)
- No. of interments: 160,000+
- Website: Official website
- Find a Grave: Centennial Park Cemetery

Centennial Park Cemetery is a large, 40.5-hectare (100-acre) cemetery in the southern Adelaide suburb of Pasadena, South Australia, located on Goodwood Road. It is the largest cemetery in the southern suburbs and one of the largest in the Adelaide metropolitan area. It is jointly owned by the local government areas of the City of Mitcham and the City of Unley, with a Board of Management that includes two serving councillors from each council.

== History ==
The cemetery was opened in June 1936, during South Australia's centennial year, although the first burial was not until 1938, when there were only ten in that year.

The cemetery contains a war graves plot known locally as Adelaide War Cemetery (marked on the plan as War Graves Plots), established by the Australian Army in 1942, holding the graves of 215 Commonwealth service personnel of World War II, primarily from local hospitals. Most of the graves are on either side of the central path from the Goodwood Road entrance. In 1946 the Commonwealth War Graves Commission took over the plot and erected a Cross of Sacrifice, the first erected by the commission in the Southern Hemisphere. Near the cross is the South Australia Cremation Memorial to nine Australian service personnel who were cremated during the same war in the state of South Australia.

In 1955, the W.A. Norman Chapel was opened and included one of the state's first crematoria (the first was opened at West Terrace Cemetery in 1903). Since that time, the various crematoria have been upgraded and in 1983, three new cremators were constructed and considered a highly modern design at that time.

== Notable interments or cremations ==
- Mahomet Allum, herbalist and healer, originally one of the Afghan cameleers in Australia
- Sir Donald Bradman, Australian cricket captain: Cremation only. Ashes scattered Bradman Oval and its gardens in Bowral, NSW
- Thomas Caldwell, World War I Victoria Cross recipient
- Cyril Chambers, South Australian federal MP
- Percy Correll, member of the Australasian Antarctic Expedition
- LT Thomas Currie "Diver" Derrick, World War II Victoria Cross recipient (cenotaph)
- Charles Fenner, geologist, naturalist, geographer and educator
- Raymond Leane, Australian army officer and Police Commissioner
- William George Murray WWI soldier, Protector of Aborigines NT, police officer responsible for the Coniston massacre
- Errol Noack, first National Service conscript to be killed in the Vietnam War
- Robert Richards, 32nd Premier of South Australia
- Phil "Pancho" Ridings AO, first-class cricketer
- Hermann Sasse, Lutheran theologian and author
- James Cyril Stobie, design engineer and inventor of the Stobie pole
- Crawford Vaughan, 27th Premier of South Australia
- Frank Walsh, 34th Premier of South Australia
- Mary Alice Ward, teacher and pastoralist
- Myrtle Rose White, author
