= Erwin Noack =

German artist and musician

Erwin Noack (4 August 1940 in Uetersen, Hamburg – 11 November 2006 in Bremen) was a German artist and musician. He was known for his murals of various buildings in Bremen and as the percussionist of Thirsty Moon, a German progressive-rock-jazz band.
