= Notak =

Coordinates: 31°29′N 71°02′E

- Town and union council
- Interactive map of Notak
- Country: Pakistan
- Region: Punjab
- Time zone: UTC+5 (PST)
- Postal code: 30041
- Area code: 30041

Notak is a town and union council of Bhakkar District in the Punjab province of Pakistan in Notak.

There is also a shrine of Abdullah Jamaj ( عبداللہ جماج ) in Notak. He was a Sufi saint. Sufi saints or Wali (Arabic: ولي, plural ʾawliyāʾ أولياء) played an instrumental role in spreading Islam throughout the world. In the traditional Islamic view, a saint is portrayed as someone "marked by [special] divine favor ... [and] holiness", and who is specifically "chosen by God and endowed with exceptional gifts, such as the ability to work miracles."

First union council chairman was Abdul Momin faqeer.

Abdul Momin faqeer is the son of Ghulam Qasim faqeer ( غلام قاسم فقیر ) and Grandson of Baqir Muhammad ( باقر محمد ) .

Baqir Muhammad was the son of Peer Sultan budhaia (پیر سلطان بڈھایا ).

Basically, this family belongs to Janjua rajput caste. Due to the elders, they were given the title of faqeer.
