= Joachim Ziesche =

German ice hockey player

- Born: 3 July 1939 (age 85); Dresden, Nazi Germany
- Height: 6 ft 4 in (193 cm)
- Weight: 201 lb (91 kg; 14 st 5 lb)
- Position: Centre
- Shot: Right
- Played for: SC Dynamo Berlin
- National team: East Germany
- NHL draft: Undrafted
- Playing career: 1958–1970

Joachim Ziesche (born 3 July 1939 in Dresden, Nazi Germany) is a retired ice hockey defender. He participated at the 1968 Winter Olympics. He was inducted into the International Ice Hockey Federation Hall of Fame in 1999.

He played for SC Dynamo Berlin and holds the record of the second-highest number of goals in club history at 284. He became the head coach for East Germany for 18 years, winning the GDR-championships 15 times and playing over 200 international matches. After retiring from play, he became the national coach, retiring in 1990 in protest of the sport's national decline.
