= Karl Wild =

German ice hockey player

Personal information
- Nationality: German
- Born: 23 November 1917 Munich, Germany
- Died: 27 April 1975 (aged 57) Munich, West Germany

Sport
- Sport: Ice hockey

Karl Wild (23 November 1917 – 27 April 1975) was a German ice hockey player. He competed in the men's tournament at the 1952 Winter Olympics.

== Career ==
Wild played his entire career for SC Riessersee between 1932 and 1952, scoring over 500 goals and achieving six German Championships. He coached the German national team during the 1960 Winter Olympics.

He served as acting chairman of FC Bayern Munich in 1955. He was inducted into the German Ice Hockey Hall of Fame in 1988.
