= Peter Prusa =

East German ice hockey player

- Born: 19 February 1944 (age 81); Rostock, Nazi Germany
- Height: 5 ft 11 in (180 cm)
- Weight: 176 lb (80 kg; 12 st 8 lb)
- Position: Forward
- Played for: SC Dynamo Berlin
- National team: East Germany
- NHL draft: Undrafted
- Playing career: 1968–1974

Peter Prusa (born 19 February 1944) is a German former ice hockey player who competed for SC Dynamo Berlin. He played for the East Germany national ice hockey team at the 1968 Winter Olympics in Grenoble.
