= Helmut Novy =

German ice hockey player (born 1944)

- Born: 31 July 1944 (age 81) Běhánky, Nazi Germany
- Height: 5 ft 7 in (170 cm)
- Weight: 159 lb (72 kg; 11 st 5 lb)
- Played for: SG Dynamo Weißwasser
- National team: East Germany
- NHL draft: Undrafted
- Playing career: ?–?

Medal record

Men's ice hockey

Representing East Germany

European Championships
Bronze medal – third place	1966 Ljubljana	Team

Helmut Novy (born 31 July 1944) is a German ice hockey player who competed for SG Dynamo Weißwasser. He won the bronze medal at the 1966 European Championships. He also competed at the 1968 Winter Olympics when the East German team finished in eighth place out of 14. He scored 1 goal in the tournament against the Czechoslovak team.
