= Roland Weißpflog =

German Nordic combined skier

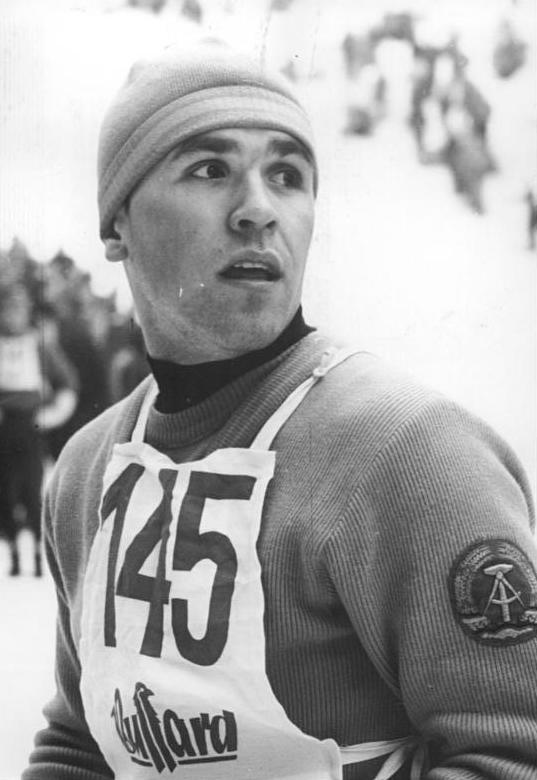
- Roland Weißpflog in 1963

Personal information
- Nationality: German
- Born: 13 November 1942 (age 82); Limbach-Oberfrohna, Germany

Sport
- Sport: Nordic combined

Roland Weißpflog (born 13 November 1942) is a German former skier. He competed in the Nordic combined events at the 1964 Winter Olympics and the 1968 Winter Olympics.
