= Kurt Noack =

German composer and bandmaster

Kurt Noack (13 February 1893 – 1 January 1945) was a German composer of light music.

His first hit was Heinzelmännchens Wachtparade ("The Brownies' Guard Parade", op. 5 in D major, 1912), which soon appeared in dozens of different arrangements. The original version for two-handed piano was published by Baltischer Musikverlag in Szczecin.

The first edition bears an illustration of three white-bearded dwarfs, in green clothing and red caps, walking from left to right along a path lined with seven toadstools in front of a cloudy blue sky. Each dwarf has his right leg aloft, and holds in his left hand a rather bulky looking gun which is largely concealed from the viewer. The rather negative assessment of the piece by critics ("trivial, shallow") in no way harmed its popularity. There are numerous recordings.

Very little is known about this composer, but he was for many years the bandmaster at the luxurious Hotel Preussenhof in Szczecin.

== Works ==
- Heinzelmännchens Wachtparade, op. 5. There are numerous arrangements (some by the composer himself?) for piano two hands, for piano four hands, for salon orchestra, for orchestra, for string quartet, for bassoon quartet, etc.
- Valse Scandinave ("Scandinavian Waltz"), op. 10
- Goldelschens Hochzeitstag ("Little Gold Elsie's Wedding Day"), op. 40
- Marionetten um Mitternacht ("Marionettes at Midnight"), op. 54
- Arrangements of other composers' works, e.g. Carl Teike's march In Treue Fest arranged for salon orchestra and published in Szczecin in 1925.
