= Bernd Hiller =

German ice hockey player

- Born: 26 February 1942 (age 83); Berlin, Nazi Germany
- Height: 5 ft 8 in (173 cm)
- Weight: 192 lb (87 kg; 13 st 10 lb)
- Position: Forward
- Played for: SC Dynamo Berlin
- National team: East Germany
- Playing career: 1960–1972

Bernd Hiller (born 26 February 1942) is a German former ice hockey player who competed for SC Dynamo Berlin. He played for the East Germany national ice hockey team at the 1968 Winter Olympics in Grenoble.
