= Dieter Pürschel =

German ice hockey player (1941–2023)

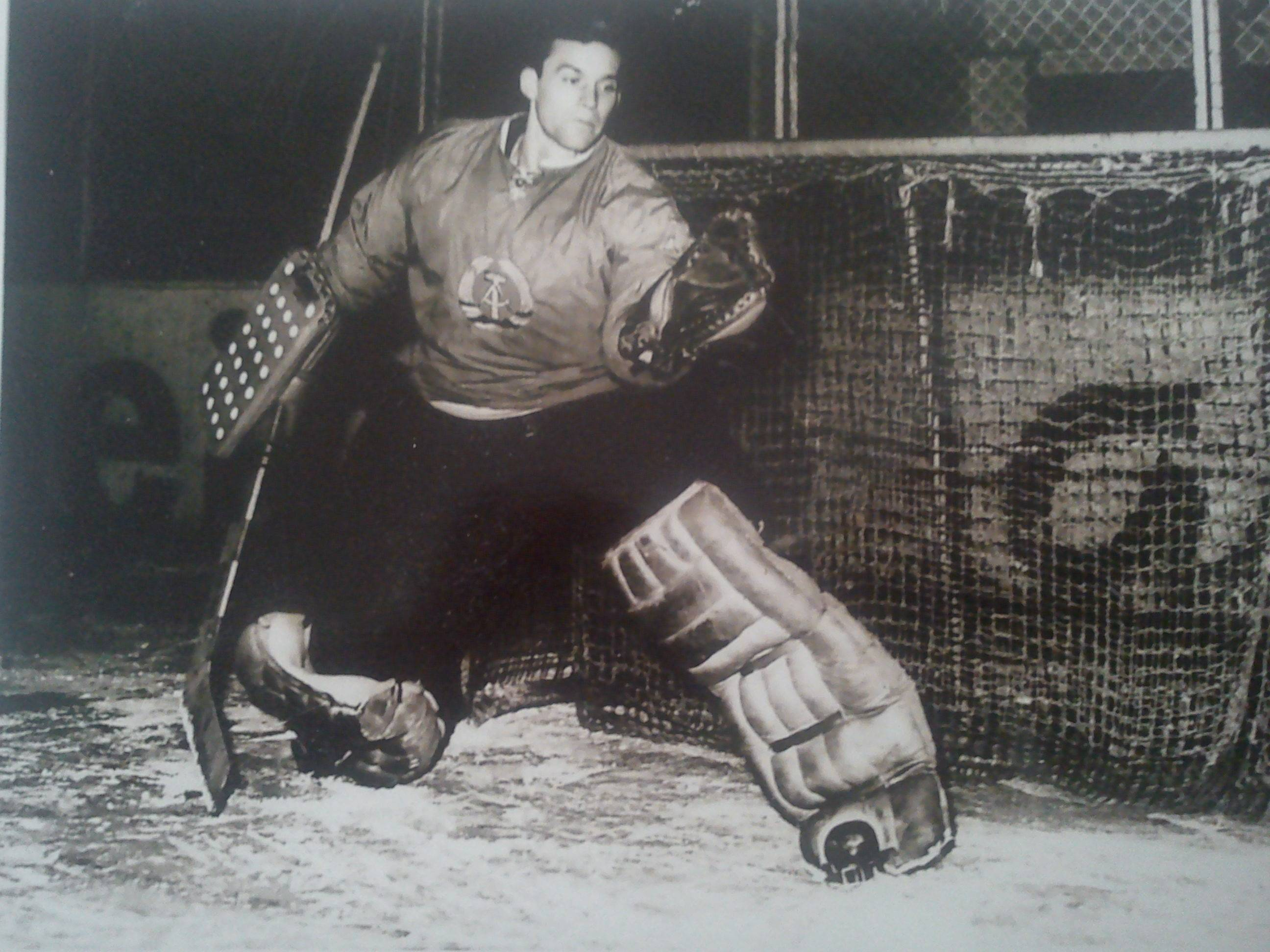
- Born: 7 February 1941; Weißwasser, Nazi Germany
- Died: 25 February 2023 (aged 82)
- Height: 6 ft 0 in (183 cm)
- Weight: 198 lb (90 kg; 14 st 2 lb)
- Position: Goaltender
- Caught: Left
- Played for: SC Dynamo Berlin
- National team: East Germany
- NHL draft: Undrafted
- Playing career: 1963–1970

Dieter Purschel (7 February 1941 – 25 February 2023) was a German ice hockey goaltender, who competed for SC Dynamo Berlin. He played for the East Germany national ice hockey team at the 1968 Winter Olympics in Grenoble.
