= Manfred Buder =

German ice hockey player (1936–2021)

- Born: 24 March 1936; Červená Voda, Czechoslovakia
- Died: 7 April 2021 (aged 85)
- Height: 5 ft 8 in (173 cm)
- Weight: 174 lb (79 kg; 12 st 6 lb)
- Position: Defence
- Played for: SG Dynamo Weißwasser
- National team: East Germany
- NHL draft: Undrafted
- Playing career: 1966–1968

Medal record

Men's ice hockey

Representing East Germany

European Championships
Bronze medal – third place	1966 Ljubljana	Team

Manfred Buder (24 March 1936 – 7 April 2021) was a German ice hockey player, who competed for SG Dynamo Weißwasser. He won the bronze medal playing for the East Germany national ice hockey team at the 1966 European Championships. Buder also represented East Germany at the 1968 Winter Olympics in Grenoble.
