= Axel Lesser =

German cross country skier (born 1946)

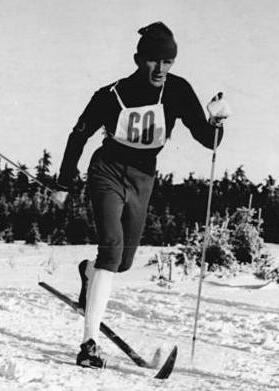
- Lesser in 1968

Medal record

Representing East Germany

Men's cross-country skiing

World Championships
| Silver medal – second place | 1970 Vysoké Tatry | 4 x 10 km |

Axel Lesser (born 18 April 1946 in Brotterode) is a former East German cross-country skier who competed in the 1960s and 1970s. He earned a silver medal in the 4 x 10 km at the 1970 FIS Nordic World Ski Championships in Vysoké Tatry.

Lesser finished 6th in the 15 km event at the 1972 Winter Olympics in Sapporo. He also was on the 4 x 10 km teams that finished 7th at the 1968 Winter Olympics and 6th in 1972. At the 1976 Winter Olympics in Innsbruck, Lesser was the second skier on the East German team that was in second place when he collided with a spectator, injured his knee, and had to abandon the race.

He is the grandfather of Erik Lesser, a biathlete who won a silver medal in the 20km individual event at the 2014 Winter Olympics.

== Bibliography ==
- Wallenchinsky, David (1984). 4x10-Kilometer Relay. The Complete Book of The Olympics. pp. 618–9.
