= Bernd Karrenbauer =

East German ice hockey player

- Born: 5 March 1944 (age 81); Rom, Nazi Germany
- Height: 5 ft 8 in (173 cm)
- Weight: 183 lb (83 kg; 13 st 1 lb)
- Position: Forward
- Played for: SC Dynamo Berlin
- National team: East Germany
- NHL draft: Undrafted
- Playing career: 1968–1974

Bernd Karrenbauer (born 5 March 1944) is a German ice hockey player who competed for SC Dynamo Berlin. He won the Pool B tournament with the East Germany national team at the 1969 World Championships.

He also participated in the 1968 Winter Olympics as a member of the East Germany national team, scoring three goals and two assists in seven games played.
