= Klaus Hirche =

East German ice hockey player (1939–2022)

- Born: 7 June 1939; Weißwasser, Saxony, Germany
- Died: 3 May 2022 (aged 82)
- Height: 5 ft 11 in (180 cm)
- Weight: 183 lb (83 kg; 13 st 1 lb)
- Position: Goaltender
- Played for: SG Dynamo Weißwasser
- National team: East Germany
- NHL draft: Undrafted
- Playing career: 1957–1972

Medal record

Men's ice hockey

Representing East Germany

European Championships
Bronze medal – third place	1966 Ljubljana	Team

Klaus Hirche (7 June 1939 – 3 May 2022) was a German ice hockey goaltender, who competed for SG Dynamo Weißwasser. He won the bronze medal competing for East Germany at the 1966 European Championships. Hirche also played for East Germany at the 1968 Winter Olympics in Grenoble. He served on the national team's coaching staff when they finished in third place in Pool B of the 1971 World Championships.

== Honours ==
Dynamo Weißwasser

- East German Ice Hockey Championship (12): 1957–58, 1958–59, 1959–60, 1960–61, 1961–62, 1962–63, 1963–64, 1964–65, 1968–69, 1969–70, 1970–71, 1971–72
