= Ningali Cullen =

Aboriginal activist

- Born: 1942; Ooldea, South Australia
- Died: 10 May 2012 (aged 69–70); Canberra
- Other names: Ngingali Cullen, Audrey Kinnear, Ningali Cobby
- Known for: Aboriginal activist

Ningali Cullen (1942–2012) was an Aboriginal activist and co-chair of the National Sorry Day Committee.

== Early life ==
Cullen was born at Ooldea, South Australia in 1942. Along with her brother and one of her sisters, she was taken from her family at the age of 4. Cullen and her brother were taken to the Koonibba Lutheran Mission Home near Ceduna, South Australia.

She was educated at Concordia College and was their first female Aboriginal student.

== Nursing career ==
After finishing her schooling, Cullen trained as a nurse at the Royal Adelaide Hospital. She worked in several hospitals across South Australia as well as for the Royal Flying Doctor Service of Australia. In 1964 Cullen moved to Port Augusta, South Australia to work at the hospital there. Cullen was horrified by the discrimination against Aboriginal people, particularly those living on the nearby missions.

During this time Cullen married Lawrie Kinnear. The couple had three children.

== Career as an activist ==
Cullen reconnected with her mother May Cobby, a Yankunjatjara woman, for the first time since she had been taken, after discovering that Cobby was living near Port Augusta. This emotional reunion was cut short by Cobby's disappearance in 1965 from Port Pirie.

Cobby had been waiting at a roadhouse with her daughter Mabel, the only one of her four children not to be taken from her as a child. Staff at the roadhouse called the police, who came to ask May and Mabel to leave the roadhouse. Mabel was taken into custody by the police and May was left at the roadhouse, despite Mabel's protests. Cullen, who had been at work, later arrived to find that May had vanished. She demanded an inquest into May's disappearance, but no trace of her mother was found.

Cullen later stated that her mother's disappearance pushed Cullen to become an activist for her people. She worked to improve access to healthcare in Aboriginal communities and became a prominent member of the Port Augusta Aboriginal community. She was involved in projects including the National Trachoma and Eye Health Program and also worked in drug and alcohol rehabilitation.

Cullen was elected to the Nulla Wanga Tjuta Regional Council, part of the Aboriginal and Torres Strait Islander Commission (ATSIC), in 1990. Two years later she moved to Canberra to take up a job as Health Policy Officer for ATSIC, later moving to the Office of Indigenous Affairs.

=== National Sorry Day ===
A million people have said sorry. At last, many non-Indigenous Australians understand what we have endured. Now we can move on to healing.

— Ningali Cullen

Cullen was a member of the National Stolen Generation Working Group established following the release of the Bringing Them Home report on 26 May 1997. She was responsible for the Journey of Healing initiative launched on 26 May 1996, and following Carol Kendall's resignation due to ill health was elected Co-Chair of the Committee.

In 2000, over 250,000 people marched across the Sydney Harbour Bridge as part of the Corroboree 2000 Bridge Walk. Following this demonstration, the Federal Government announced plans to construct Reconciliation Place. The initial plans were criticised as the community had not been consulted. Cullen was involved in the redesign of Reconciliation Place, organising consultation with members of the Stolen Generation and their families. She also arranged interviews with staff from the institutions and foster carers.

== Later life ==
Ningali married her second husband, Derick Cullen, in 2003. She reconnected with her daughter Ali Cobby Eckermann, who had been adopted shortly after birth.

Cullen died on 10 May 2012.
