= Bernd Poindl =

German ice hockey player

- Born: 30 August 1941 (age 85) Weißwasser, Germany
- Height: 5 ft 9 in (175 cm)
- Weight: 183 lb (83 kg; 13 st 1 lb)
- Played for: SG Dynamo Weißwasser
- National team: East Germany
- NHL draft: Undrafted
- Playing career: ?–?

Medal record

Men's ice hockey

Representing East Germany

European Championships
Bronze medal – third place	1966 Ljubljana	Team

Bernd Poindl (born 30 August 1941) is a German ice hockey player, who competed for SG Dynamo Weißwasser. He won the bronze medal with the East Germany national ice hockey team at the 1966 European Championships. Poindl also competed for East Germany at the 1968 Winter Olympics in Grenoble.
