= Errol Noack =

Australian Army private (1945–1966)

Errol Wayne Noack
- Born: 28 March 1945; North Adelaide, Australia
- Died: 24 May 1966 (aged 21); Vung Tau, South Vietnam
- Burial place: Centennial Park Cemetery
- Military career
- Allegiance: Australia
- Branch: Australian Army
- Service years: 1965-1966
- Rank: Private
- Nickname: Flex
- Unit: 5th Battalion, Royal Australian Regiment
- Conflicts: Vietnam War †

Errol Wayne Noack (28 March 1945 – 24 May 1966) was a 21 year old Australian Army Private who was the first Australian National Service conscript to be killed in the Vietnam War, only ten days after he arrived in South Vietnam. Noack was the victim of friendly fire, shot by members of another Australian unit during Operation Hardihood after being mistaken for a Vietcong.

== Early life ==
Noack was born on 28 March 1945 in North Adelaide, South Australia to Walter Heinrich Noack a mechanic, and his wife Dorothy Muriel, née Wilson. His mother abandoned the family when he was an infant and he was raised by his father and his aunts.

He attended Richmond Primary School in Keswick and then Concordia College. After completing school he worked various jobs before working as a tuna fisherman with his father.

== Military service and death ==
In 1964, compulsory national service for 20-year-old males was introduced under the National Service Act 1964. The selection of conscripts was made by a sortition or lottery draw based on date of birth, and conscripts were obligated to give two years of continuous full-time service. Noack was among the first conscripted and he was enlisted in the Australian Army on 30 June 1965.

He received basic training at Puckapunyal and was then posted as a machine-gunner to the newly-formed 5th Battalion, Royal Australian Regiment (5RAR) at Holsworthy Barracks, New South Wales. Early in 1966 5RAR learnt that it was to serve in South Vietnam as one of two infantry battalions in the 1st Australian Task Force (1 ATF). As it was given only three months' notice for its deployment, the training schedule prior to embarkation was hectic. 'Range practices began in the dawn hours and often went until 2200 hours. Nights and weekends were spent training in night movement and conducting lectures on Vietnamese customs, history, culture and language'. Each company trained at Gospers, in the Wiangaree State Forest in New South Wales, as well as at the Jungle Training Centre at Canungra, Queensland. In March 1966 the battalion emplaned at Aero Paddock at Holsworthy and moved to Gospers for its final exercise, which included advances to contact, night movement and defensive operations. After this C Company would deploy to South Vietnam on HMAS Sydney, whilst the remainder of the battalion flew by air. He returned to Adelaide for pre-deployment leave and belatedly celebrated his 21st birthday. On 13 May 1966, Noack together with other soldiers of 5RAR flew to South Vietnam.

On 16 May 1966 the United States Army 503rd Infantry Regiment commenced Operation Hardihood in Phước Tuy Province to secure the area around Nui Dat for the establishment of a base area for 1 ATF.

On 24 May, following acclimatisation at Vũng Tàu, 5 RAR was moved by helicopter to Nui Dat and was tasked with clearing any Vietcong in an area 6,000 metres east and north-east of Nui Dat. Noack, serving in B Company, 5RAR was sent forward with Privates Kevin Borger and John O’Callaghan to establish a listening post. On returning from refilling their water bottles at a creek, they received fire and Noack was hit in the stomach, Borger reported Noack saying "I can't feel anything, I'm dying, God help me." Noack was medevaced to the U.S. Army's 36th Evacuation Hospital at Vũng Tàu, but died shortly after arrival.

It quickly became clear that Noack was a victim of friendly fire as A Company, approaching the creek from a different direction, had fired upon the B Company listening post, mistakenly believing it to be a Vietcong position. However, on 25 May Major General Kenneth Mackay, commander, Australian Force Vietnam reported that Noack "had been killed by enemy gunfire." Contemporary news reports reflected that misinformation saying that a "Vietcong squad apparently killed conscript," claiming that A and B Companies had trapped a Vietcong unit between them.

Noack's body was returned to Australia and on 1 June 1966 he was buried at the Centennial Park Cemetery in Adelaide.

== Legacy ==
As the first conscript killed in Vietnam, Noack's death was seized upon by the nascent antiwar movement in Australia. Antiwar protesters wrote: ERROL WAYNE NOACK aged 21 HIS WAS NOT TO REASON WHY" in red paint on Adelaide's Cross of Sacrifice. Noack's uncle was quoted as saying: "To us Errol died in Vietnam for the good of Australia. None of us is very happy about it - nobody could be. But I don’t want any attack on Government policy to be made out of this. It wouldn’t be right - using the boy’s life for propaganda."

In 1989 The Errol Noack House was opened in Mitchell Park, South Australia to provide emergency accommodation for veterans and their families. It has since been demolished for redevelopment.
