= Ingrid Noack =

Australian cricketer (born 1982)

Personal information
- Born: 10 April 1982 (age 44)
- Batting: Right-handed
- Bowling: Right-arm off break

Domestic team information
- Years: Team
- 2002/03–2003/04: Victoria

Career statistics
Competition	WLA
Matches	5
Runs scored	1
Batting average	1.00
100s/50s	0/0
Top score	1*
Balls bowled	–
Wickets	–
Bowling average	–
5 wickets in innings	–
10 wickets in match	–
Best bowling	–
Catches/stumpings	1/–
- Source: ESPNCricinfo, 30 June 2021

Ingrid Noack (born 10 April 1982) is an Australian former cricketer. A right-handed batter and right-arm off break bowler, she played five List A matches for Victoria in the Women's National Cricket League (WNCL) during the 2002–03 and 2003–04 seasons.
