= Rüdiger Noack =

German ice hockey player

- Born: 30 October 1944 (age 80); Weißwasser, Nazi Germany
- Height: 6 ft 0 in (183 cm)
- Weight: 170 lb (77 kg; 12 st 2 lb)
- Position: Right Wing
- Played for: SG Dynamo Weißwasser
- National team: East Germany
- NHL draft: Undrafted
- Playing career: 1973–1977

Medal record

Men's ice hockey

Representing East Germany

European Championships
Bronze medal – third place	1966 Ljubljana	Team

Rüdiger Noack (born 30 November 1944) is a German ice hockey player, who competed for SG Dynamo Weißwasser. He won the bronze medal with the East Germany national ice hockey team at the 1966 European Championships. Poindl also competed for East Germany at the 1968 Winter Olympics in Grenoble, scoring one goal and two assists in seven games played.
