= Lothar Fuchs =

German ice hockey player

- Born: 18 June 1941 (age 84) Georgenthal, Nazi Germany
- Height: 5 ft 10 in (178 cm)
- Weight: 203 lb (92 kg; 14 st 7 lb)
- Position: Forward
- Played for: ASK Vorwärts Crimmitschau
- National team: East Germany
- NHL draft: Undrafted
- Playing career: ?–?

Lothar Fuchs (born 18 June 1941) is a German former ice hockey player who competed for ASK Vorwärts Crimmitschau. He played for the East Germany national ice hockey team at the 1968 Winter Olympics in Grenoble.
