= John Noack =

Australian rules footballer

Personal information
- Full name: John Frederick Noack
- Born: 16 May 1944 (age 82); Yorketown, South Australia
- Original team: Sturt

Playing career^{1}
Years	Club	Games (Goals)
1967	Geelong	1 (0)
- ^{1} Playing statistics correct to the end of 1967.

John Frederick Noack (born 16 May 1944) is a former Australian rules footballer who played for Geelong in the Victorian Football League (now known as the Australian Football League).

Noack is of Wendish descent and was one of the founders of the Wendish Heritage Society of Australia.

Noack attended Concordia College in Adelaide and went on to study history, philosophy and languages at Adelaide University. Although he intended to be a history and geography teacher, his father influenced him into the ministry and he completed the Lutheran Seminary course in 1968. During his religious studies he played football for Sturt in Adelaide and one game for Geelong when he lived there in 1967 as a trainee vicar.
