= Dieter Kratzsch =

German ice hockey player (1939–2024)

- Born: 2 June 1939; Crimmitschau, Germany
- Died: 25 February 2024 (aged 84)
- Height: 5 ft 11 in (180 cm)
- Weight: 192 lb (87 kg; 13 st 10 lb)
- Position: Defence
- Played for: SC Wismut Karl-Marx-Stadt; ASK Vorwärts Crimmitschau
- National team: East Germany
- NHL draft: Undrafted
- Playing career: 1957–1970

Dieter Kratzsch (2 June 1939 – 25 February 2024) was a German ice hockey player who competed for ASK Vorwärts Crimmitschau. He played 109 games for the East Germany national team from 1959 to 1968, including the 1968 Winter Olympics in Grenoble.
