= East Germany men's national ice hockey team =

East Germany
- IIHF code: GDR

First international
- Poland 8 – 3 East Germany (East Berlin, East Germany; January 28, 1951); Last international Austria 3 – 2 East Germany (Megève, France; April 8, 1990)

Biggest win
- East Germany 20 – 0 France (Ljubljana, Yugoslavia; March 12, 1980)

Biggest defeat
- Czechoslovakia 27 – 3 East Germany (East Berlin, East Germany; April 25th, 1951)

Olympics
- Appearances: 1 (1968)

IIHF World Championships
- Appearances: 26 (first in 1957)
- Best result: 5th (1957, 1965, 1966, 1970)

IIHF European Championships and World Cup
- Appearances: 1 (1966)
- Best result: (bronze) (1966)

International record (W–L–T)
- 306–286–54

Medal record

Pool B / Division I
| Gold medal – first place | 1956 East Germany | |
| Gold medal – first place | 1969 Yugoslavia | |
| Gold medal – first place | 1973 Austria | |
| Gold medal – first place | 1975 Japan | |
| Gold medal – first place | 1977 Japan | |
| Gold medal – first place | 1982 Austria | |

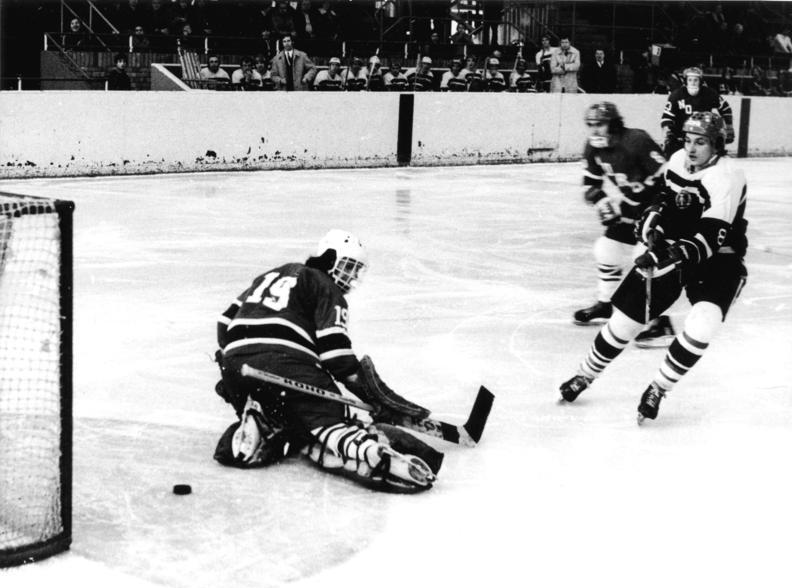
Team East Germany defeats Team Norway, 6–2, in a March 1974 friendly game in East Berlin.

The East German national men's ice hockey team was a national ice hockey representing the German Democratic Republic (GDR). The first international game was played in East Berlin on 28 January 1951, losing 3–8 to Team Poland.

The team competed in many international competitions, including several in which they competed with the top teams for medals, but won only the European Championship bronze medal in 1966 in Yugoslavia. The only time they competed in the Olympics was in Grenoble in 1968. They scored 13 goals in 7 games, but didn't win any games leaving them with no points in the standings. From that point on the team refused to participate in Olympic ice hockey, but participated in other tournaments where they continued to play poorly. The team ceased playing in 1990, just before the German reunification.

What would become the team's final game was played on 8 April 1990 in Megève during the B Group of the World Championship, and was lost to Austria, 2-3. In October 1990, Germany was re-unified.

== Olympic record ==
| Games | GP | W | OW | T | OL | L | GF | GA | Coach | Captain | Finish | Rank |
|---|---|---|---|---|---|---|---|---|---|---|---|---|
| 1928–1948 | As part of Germany | | | | | | | | | | | |
| (Norway) 1952 Oslo | did not participate | | | | | | | | | | | |
| (Italy) 1956 Cortina d'Ampezzo | 8 | 1 | 0 | 2 | 0 | 5 | 15 | 41 | Frank Trottier | ? | Final Round | 6th (United Team of Germany) |
| (United States) 1960 Squaw Valley | 7 | 1 | 0 | 0 | 0 | 6 | 9 | 54 | Karl Wild | ? | Final Round | 6th (United Team of Germany) |
| (Austria) 1964 Innsbruck | 2 | 0 | 0 | 1 | 0 | 1 | 7 | 8 | Markus Egen | ? | Qualification | 7th (United Team of Germany) |
| (France) 1968 Grenoble | 8 | 1 | 0 | 0 | 0 | 7 | 16 | 49 | Rudi Schmieder | ? | Final Round | 8th |
| 1972–1988 | did not participate | | | | | | | | | | | |
| 1992 | Since 1990 as part of Germany | | | | | | | | | | | |

1968 Winter Olympic team

- Ulrich Noack
- Bernd Karrenbauer
- Hartmut Nickel
- Helmut Novy
- Wolfgang Plotka
- Wilfried Sock
- Dieter Purschel
- Klaus Hirche
- Dieter Kratzsch
- Dieter Voigt
- Manfred Buder
- Lothar Fuchs
- Peter Prusa
- Joachim Ziesche
- Bernd Poindl
- Dietmar Peters
- Bernd Hiller
- Rüdiger Noack

== World Championship record ==
The national ice sports association of the German Democratic Republic

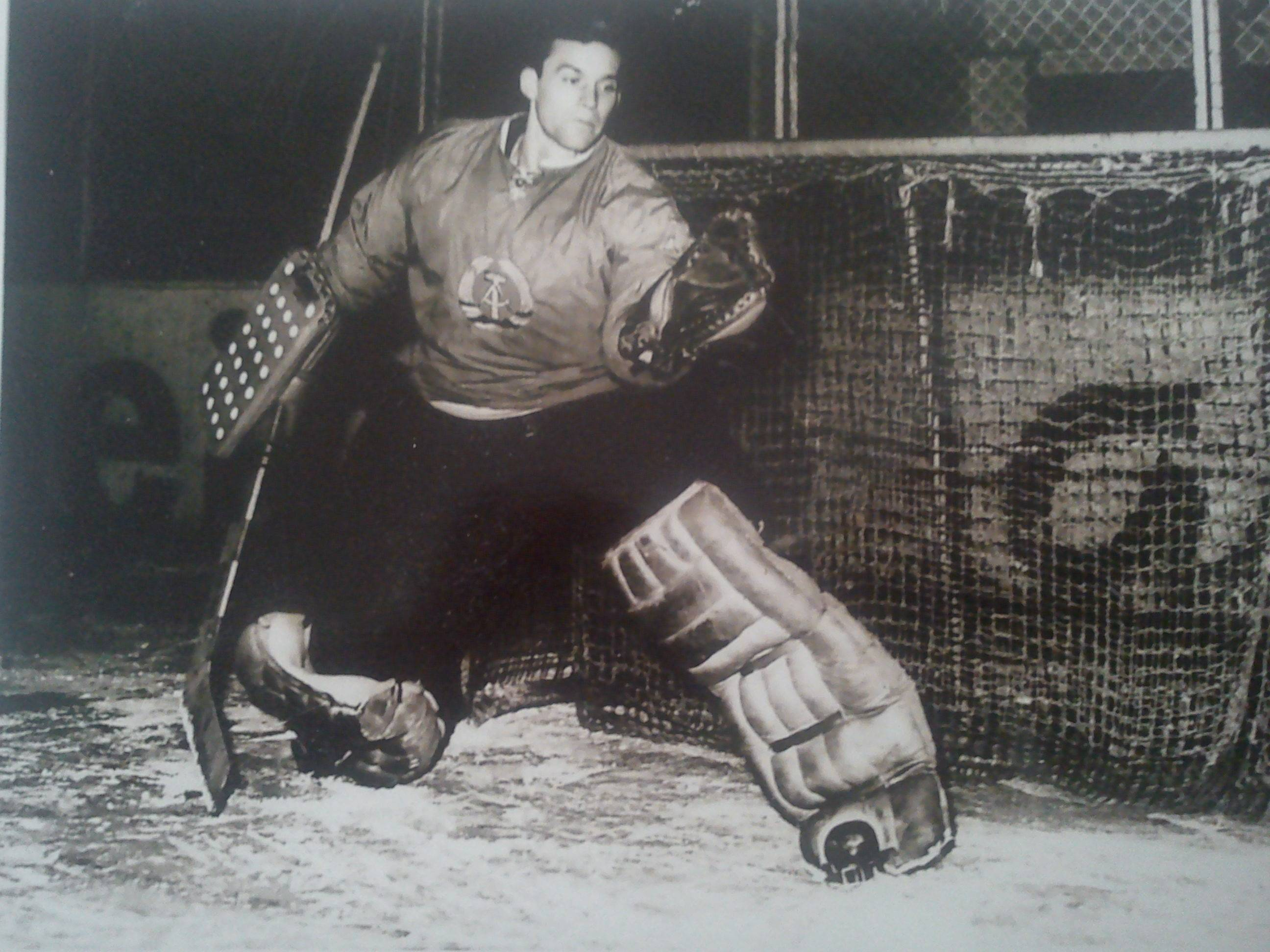
Dieter Pürschel

- 1920 - 1955 - Did not participate (see German national ice hockey team)
- 1956 - Finished in 11th place (Won "B" Pool)
- 1957 - Finished in 5th place
- 1958 - Did not participate
- 1959 - Finished in 9th place
- 1961 - Finished in 5th place
- 1962 - Did not participate
- 1963 - Finished in 6th place
- 1965 - Finished in 5th place
- 1966 - Finished in 5th place
- 1967 - Finished in 7th place
- 1969 - Finished in 7th place (Won "B" Pool)
- 1970 - Finished in 5th place
- 1971 - Finished in 9th place (3rd in "B" Pool)
- 1972 - Finished in 9th place (3rd in "B" Pool)
- 1973 - Finished in 7th place (Won "B" Pool)
- 1974 - Finished in 6th place
- 1975 - Finished in 7th place (Won "B" Pool)
- 1976 - Finished in 8th place
- 1977 - Finished in 9th place (Won "B" Pool)
- 1978 - Finished in 8th place
- 1979 - Finished in 10th place (2nd in "B" Pool)
- 1981 - Finished in 12th place (4th in "B" Pool)
- 1982 - Finished in 9th place (Won "B" Pool)
- 1983 - Finished in 6th place
- 1985 - Finished in 8th place
- 1986 - Finished in 11th place (3rd in "B" Pool)
- 1987 - Finished in 13th place (5th in "B" Pool)
- 1989 - Finished in 13th place (5th in "B" Pool)
- 1990 - Finished in 13th place (5th in "B" Pool)
- 1991 and onward - Did not participate (see German national ice hockey team)

== See also ==
- Germany men's national ice hockey team
