= Hartmut Nickel =

German ice hockey player (1944–2019)

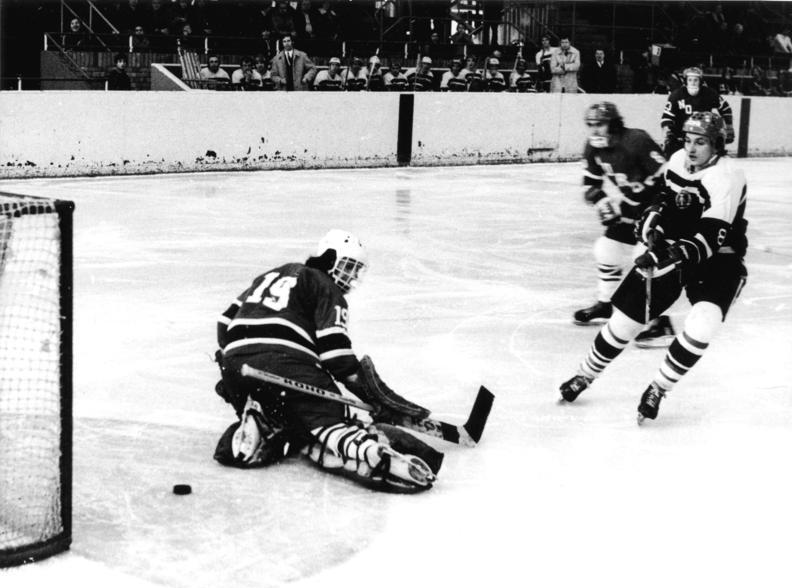
- Nickel (right) in 1974
- Born: 16 November 1944; Weißwasser, Nazi Germany
- Died: 27 June 2019 (aged 74)
- Height: 6 ft 0 in (183 cm)
- Weight: 181 lb (82 kg; 12 st 13 lb)
- Played for: SC Dynamo Berlin
- National team: East Germany
- NHL draft: Undrafted
- Playing career: 1963–1974

Hartmut Nickel (16 November 1944 – 27 June 2019) was a German ice hockey player, who competed for SC Dynamo Berlin between 1963 and 1974. He played for the East Germany national ice hockey team at the 1968 Winter Olympics in Grenoble.

Nickel was popularly called "Father Polarbear" (German: Papa Eisbär) at Eisbären Berlin. After the passing of Nickel in 2019, the northern curved end of the Mercedes-Benz Arena, with terracing for active supporters of Eisbären Berlin, was officially named the Hartmut Nickel Curve (German: Hartmut Nickel Kurve), at the request of club supporters.
