= Wilfried Sock =

German ice hockey player

- Born: 2 July 1944 (age 80); Weißwasser, Nazi Germany
- Height: 5 ft 6 in (168 cm)
- Weight: 170 lb (77 kg; 12 st 2 lb)
- Position: Defence
- Played for: SG Dynamo Weißwasser
- National team: East Germany
- NHL draft: Undrafted
- Playing career: ?–?

Wilfried Sock (born 2 July 1944) is a German former ice hockey player, who competed for SG Dynamo Weißwasser. He played for the East Germany national ice hockey team at the 1968 Winter Olympics in Grenoble.
