= Dietmar Peters =

German ice hockey player

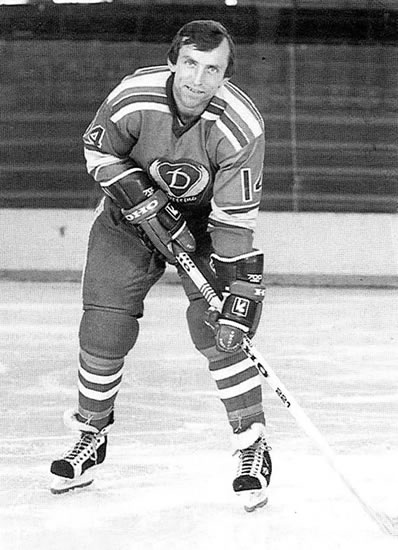
- Born: 8 August 1949 (age 76) Grapzow, Soviet Occupation Zone, Germany
- Height: 5 ft 8 in (173 cm)
- Weight: 165 lb (75 kg; 11 st 11 lb)
- Position: Right wing
- Played for: SC Empor Rostock; SC Dynamo Berlin
- National team: East Germany
- NHL draft: Undrafted
- Playing career: 1973–1986

Dietmar Peters (born 8 August 1949) is a German former ice hockey player who competed for SC Empor Rostock and SC Dynamo Berlin. He played for the East Germany national ice hockey team at the 1968 Winter Olympics in Grenoble.
