= Ulrich Noack =

East German ice hockey player

- Born: 2 November 1942 (age 82); Görlitz, Nazi Germany
- Height: 6 ft 0 in (183 cm)
- Weight: 179 lb (81 kg; 12 st 11 lb)
- Position: Defence
- Played for: SG Dynamo Weißwasser
- National team: East Germany
- NHL draft: Undrafted
- Playing career: 1962–1970

Ulrich Noack (born 2 November 1942) is a German former ice hockey player, who competed for SG Dynamo Weißwasser. He played for the East Germany national ice hockey team at the 1968 Winter Olympics in Grenoble.
