= Eisbären Berlin =

German professional ice hockey team

- City: Berlin, Germany
- League: Deutsche Eishockey Liga
- Founded: 1954; 72 years ago
- Home arena: Uber Arena (capacity: 14,200)
- Colours
- Owners: Anschutz Entertainment Group (Philip Anschutz, chairman)
- General manager: Stéphane Richer
- Head coach: Éric Dubois
- Captain: Kai Wissmann
- Affiliates: Eisbären Juniors Berlin (Regionalliga)
- Website: eisbaeren.de

Franchise history
- 1954–1990: SC Dynamo Berlin
- 1990–1992: EHC Dynamo Berlin

The Eisbären Berlin (English: Berlin Polar Bears) is a professional ice hockey team based in Berlin, Germany. The team competes in the Deutsche Eishockey Liga (DEL), the highest level of play in professional German ice hockey, and is also one of the league's founding members. The Eisbären have won the DEL championship more often than any other team, with eleven DEL championships as of the 2024-25 season. They won the German ice hockey cup in 2008 as well as the European Trophy in 2010. Before reunification the team won the East German ice hockey championship 15 times as SC Dynamo Berlin.

The club's origins go back to 1954. It was the ice hockey department of sports club SC Dynamo Berlin. Following incorporation into the West German 1. Bundesliga in 1990, the ice hockey department became the independent ice hockey club EHC Dynamo Berlin, and then in 1992 renamed EHC Eisbären Berlin. The home games are played at the Uber Arena.

The Eisbären Berlin are owned by the Anschutz Entertainment Group. The official logo of the team is the polar bear, a reference to the bear appearing on Berlin's coat of arms.

== History ==
=== 1954–1994: GDR and 1. Bundesliga years ===
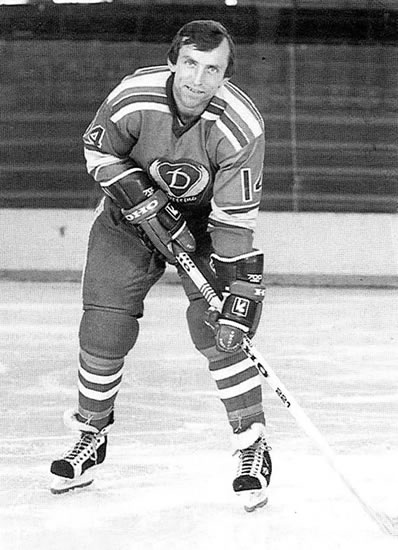
Dietmar Peters while playing for SC Dynamo Berlin

The sports club SC Dynamo Berlin was part of the SV Dynamo sports association. The SV Dynamo was the nationwide sports association of the Stasi, Volkspolizei, and customs. The sports club offered a wide spectrum of competitive athletic activities, including track and field, football, swimming, gymnastics, fencing, rowing, boxing and ice skating. SC Dynamo Berlin created an ice hockey section in 1954. The hockey section originally began as an ice hockey section of the SV Deutsche Volkspolizei Berlin sports community in 1950.

SC Dynamo Berlin trained and played its matches in the large Werner-Seelenbinder-Halle in Prenzlauer Berg during its first years. The team won their first East German title in 1966. The league was reduced to just two teams, SC Dynamo Berlin and SG Dynamo Weißwasser, in 1971, which made up the smallest ice hockey league in the world. Altogether, SC Dynamo Berlin won the East German championship 15 times, the last title coming in 1988. In 1984, SC Dynamo Berlin competed at the European Cup of Champions and came in third place.

In 1990, the year of German reunification, both former East German ice hockey clubs, SC Dynamo Berlin and SG Dynamo Weißwasser, which had been renamed PEV Weißwasser, were assigned to the 1. Bundesliga, at the time the highest level of play in German ice hockey. The ice hockey department of SC Dynamo Berlin became independent ice hockey club EHC Dynamo Berlin in the same year. However, Berlin was unable to compete successfully and was consequently relegated to the lower 2. Bundesliga at the end of the season. The club was promoted back to the 1. Bundesliga following the 1991–92 season. It was known that the president of SV Dynamo and the head of the Stasi Erich Mielke had been a warm supporter of ice hockey. EHC Dynamo Berlin had been financed by the East German Ministry of the Interior until the end of 1990. The club tried to distance itself from its East German image, under the leadership of Günter Haake and manager Lorenz Funk. In 1992 the club was renamed again, this time to "EHC Eisbären Berlin" and the polar bear logo was also introduced. However, due to severe financial difficulties, the club had to rely heavily on its junior and other low-tier players and thus regularly finished at the bottom of the standings and struggled to avoid relegation to the 2. Bundeliga.

=== 1994–present: DEL years ===
The German Eishockey Bundesliga was abolished following the 1993–94 season and a new league – Deutsche Eishockey Liga (DEL) – was created. The Eisbären are one of the league's 18 founding members. Following the Bosman ruling of 1995, the club replaced almost the entire roster with veteran European players in 1996–97. The team finished the regular season in third place and reached the DEL play-offs for the first time. In 1997 the club was renamed EHC neue Eisbären Berlin gegr. 1997 e.V. The following season, 1997–98, the Eisbären advanced to the final round of the DEL play-offs and finished the season as runner up. The team also participated in the 1998 IIHF Continental Cup in Tampere, Finland, and finished in second place. In 1998–99, Eisbären participated in the European Hockey League and finished in third place.

The Anschutz Entertainment Group acquired sole ownership of the Eisbären in 1999, ensuring financial stability. The team finished in second place at the 2000 IIHF Continental Cup. In 2002–03 and 2003–04 the team finished the DEL regular season in first place, but fell short of capturing the title. At that time, the team had already become hugely popular, selling out 28 of 31 home games during the 2003–04 season In 2005–06 and 2006–07, the Eisbären were the German representative at the Spengler Cup in Davos, Switzerland.

In 2004–05, a season marked by the 2004–05 NHL lockout, saw the Eisbären capture their first DEL championship. With the help of NHL veterans such as Erik Cole, Nathan Dempsey, and Olaf Kölzig, Berlin beat Mannheim in three games. The title was defended successfully in 2006 against the DEG Metro Stars. Their third DEL championship was captured in 2008, when the Eisbären beat Kölner Haie in the final round of the play-offs. In 2008, the Eisbären hosted the NHL's Tampa Bay Lightning in a pre-season game, which the Lightning won 4:1. The fourth DEL title followed in 2009, when the DEG Metro Stars were beaten 3:1 in a best-of-five final play-off round. In 2010, the team won the European Trophy, continuing its success on an international scale. A fifth DEL title was won in 2011, when the Grizzly Adams Wolfsburg were swept in the final round of the play-offs. A sixth title was won in 2012, after a full-length best-of-five final against Adler Mannheim, with a seventh coming the next year after a 3:1 series victory over Kölner Haie. With their 2013 title, the Eisbären Berlin had won 7 DEL titles, including three straight, making them the DEL championship record holder for several years; Adler Mannheim later tied the record in 2019.

In the 2016–17 league season, the Eisbären Berlin drew an average home attendance of 12,052.

Eisbären ultimately won their eighth DEL championship in 2021, defeating Grizzlys Wolfsburg 2:1 in a best-of-three, and in the process reclaiming the record for most DEL championships.

== Home arena ==
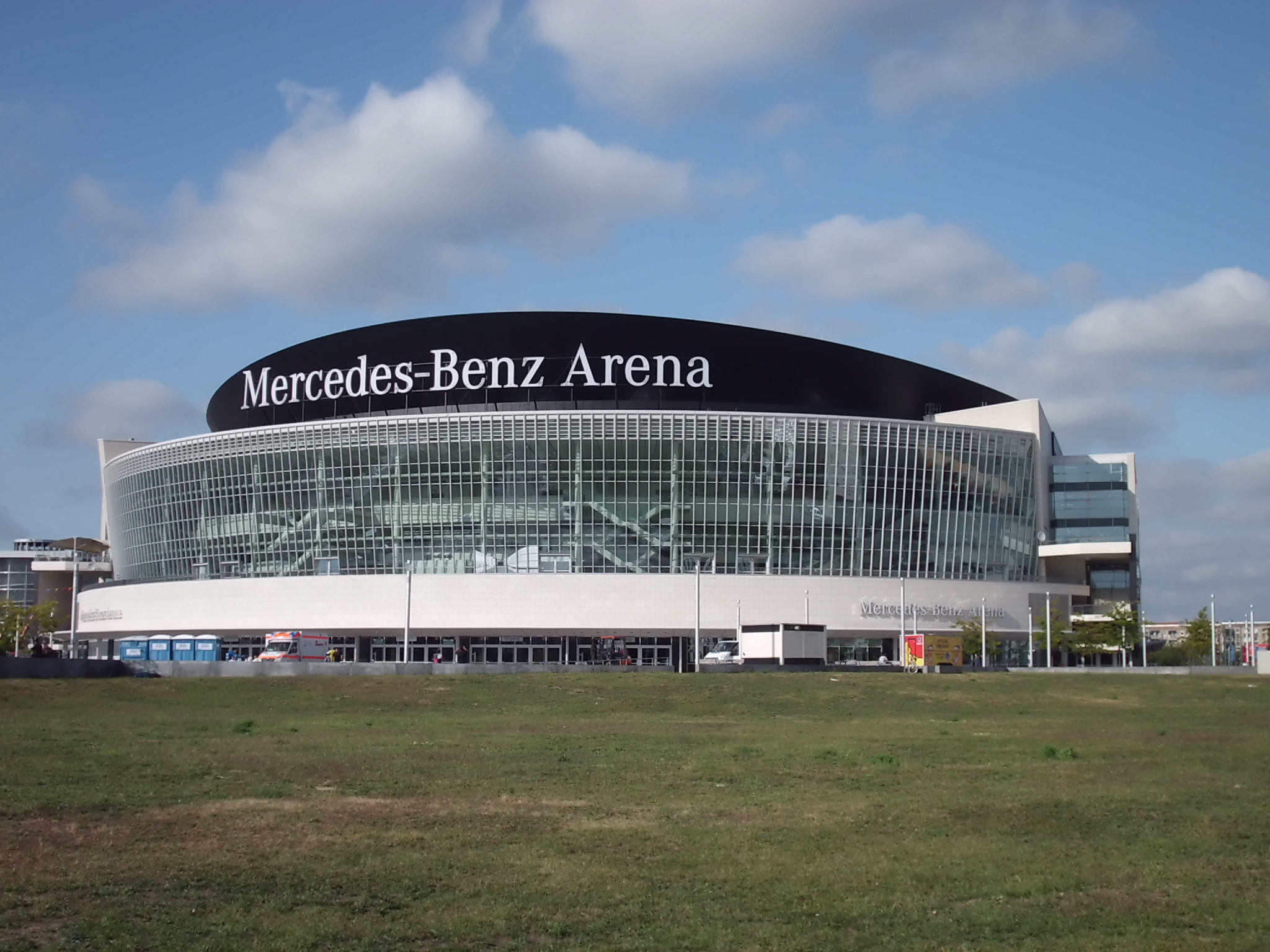
Since 2008, the home ice has been Uber Arena.

SC Dynamo Berlin played its home matches in the Werner-Seelenbinder-Halle in Prenzlauer Berg during its early years. The team then moved to the large sports complex Dynamo-Sportforum in Hohenschönhausen in 1964. The team played in the ice hockey facility of the Sportforum Hohenschönhausen until the 2007–08 season. The corrugated roof of the ice hockey facility gave rise to its popular name ”The Corrugated Palace" (German: Wellblechpalast). The capacity of the facility is 4,695 spectators.

Eisbären Berlin was one of the few former East German ice hockey clubs that managed to establish itself amongst the competition from clubs from the former West Germany. The team became popular in areas such as Hohenschönhausen, Marzahn and Hellersdorf. Supporters of Eisbären Berlin chanted "East, East, East Berlin" and "Dynamo, Dynamo" well into the 2000s.

Eisbären Berlin moved its home matches to the new Uber Arena (then known as O_{2} World) in the 2008–09 season. The Uber Arena is a multi-functional arena located in Friedrichshain near the Spree river. It has a seating-capacity of 14,200. However, the team still uses the Wellblechpalast as a training facility. The youth teams of Eisbären Berlin are also based in the Sportforum Hohenschönhausen.

The northern curved end of the Uber Arena, with terracing for active supporters of Eisbären Berlin, was officially named the Hartmut Nickel Curve (German: Hartmut Nickel Kurve) in 2019, after the passing of legendary SC Dynamo Berlin forward Hartmut Nickel. Nickel was popularly known as "Father Polarbear" (German: Papa Eisbär) in the club.

== Team anthem ==
The official team anthem of the Eisbären Berlin is "Hey, wir wollen die Eisbären seh'n" (approximately "Hey, We Want to See The Polar Bears"), recorded by veteran East German band the Puhdys in 1997. The song became a popular tune in German mountain resorts during après-ski parties, and went on to appear on several winter-themed music compilations. Dutch team Geleen Eaters have also used a lyrically altered cover of the song as their victory anthem.

The Eisbären goal song consists of a sequence of four separate elements. The line "Berlin, Halleluja Berlin", from the song "Brandenburg" by Rainald Grebe is followed by the can-can from Jacques Offenbach's Orpheus in the Underworld and the line "Ach du meine Nase" by the East German puppet character Pittiplatsch. The sequence is completed by the children's rhyme "Ene mene miste" from the popular children's TV programme Rappelkiste.

== Honors ==
(gold) Deutsche Eishockey Liga Championship: 2005, 2006, 2008, 2009, 2011, 2012, 2013, 2021, 2022, 2024, 2025, 2026
(gold) East German Ice Hockey Championship: 1966, 1967, 1968, 1976, 1977, 1978, 1979, 1980, 1982, 1983, 1984, 1985, 1986, 1987, 1988
(gold) European Trophy: 2010
(gold) Deutscher Eishockey-Pokal: 2008
(silver) IIHF Continental Cup: 1998, 2000
(bronze) European Hockey League (EHL): 1999

== Players ==
=== Current roster ===
Updated 25 May 2026.

No.	Nat	Player	Pos	S/G	Age	Acquired	Birthplace
10	(Germany)	Lean Bergmann	C	L	28	2023	Hemer, Germany
23	(Canada)	Blaine Byron	C	L	31	2023	Rideau, Ontario, Canada
17	(Canada)	Jean-Sébastien Dea	C	R	32	2025	La Prairie, Quebec, Canada
43	(Germany)	Andreas Eder	RW	R	30	2025	Tegernsee, Germany
40	(Germany)	Korbinian Geibel	D	L	24	2020	Starnberg, Germany
77	(Germany)	Eric Hördler	RW	L	22	2022	Berlin, Germany
13	(United States)	Patrick Khodorenko	C	L	28	2025	Walnut Creek, California, United States
94	(United Kingdom)	Liam Kirk	LW	L	26	2024	Maltby, England, United Kingdom
83	(Germany)	Moritz Kretzschmar	D	L	20	2025	Berlin, Germany
12	(Germany)	Eric Mik	D	L	26	2018	Berlin, Germany
18	(Germany)	Jonas Müller (C)	D	L	30	2010	Berlin, Germany
73	(Germany)	Lennart Neiße	G	L	20	2025	Schrobenhausen, Germany
56	(Finland)	Markus Niemeläinen	D	L	28	2024	Kuopio, Finland
75	(Germany)	Norwin Panocha	D	L	21	2024	Bayreuth, Germany
93	(Germany)	Leo Pföderl	RW	R	33	2019	Bad Tölz, Germany
5	(United States)	Mitch Reinke	D	R	30	2024	Stillwater, Minnesota, United States
9	(Canada)	Ty Ronning	RW	R	29	2023	Paradise Valley, Arizona, United States
4	(Canada)	Adam Smith	D	L	30	2024	East Gwillimbury, Ontario, Canada
46	(Germany)	Gregor Stocker	D	R	19	2025	Munich, Germany
95	(Germany)	Frederik Tiffels (A)	LW	L	31	2023	Köln, Germany
38	(Canada)	Yannick Veilleux (A)	LW	L	33	2021	Saint-Hippolyte, Quebec, Canada
37	(Norway)	Markus Vikingstad	LW	L	27	2025	Karlstad, Sweden
21	(Germany)	Manuel Wiederer	C	R	29	2021	Deggendorf, Germany
6	(Germany)	Kai Wissmann (C)	D	R	30	2023	Villingen-Schwenningen, Germany
32	(Germany)	Niclas Wolter	G	L	18	2025	Bremen, Germany

=== Honored members ===
- 7 Frank Hördler
- 11 Sven Felski
- 14 Stefan Ustorf
- 19 Mark Beaufait
- 20 Denis Pederson
- 24 André Rankel
- 26 Florian Busch
- 27 Steve Walker
- 72 Rob Zepp

== Season-by-season record ==
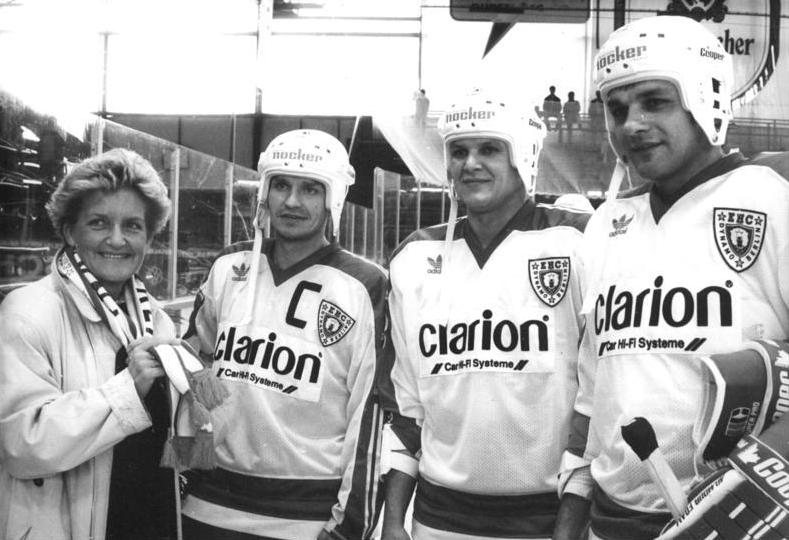
Eisbären Berlin players in 1990

Note: GP= Games, W = Win, L = Loss, T = Tie, OTL = Overtime Loss, GF = Goals For, GA = Goals Against

Point System: Win = 2 points, T = 1 point, OTL = 1 point

Season	League	GP	W	L	T	OTL	Points	Finish	GF	GA	Postseason
1990–91	1. BL	44	8	29	7	0	23	12th	118	146	Relegated to 2. BL, lost to PEV Weißwasser 0:3 (best of five series)
1991–92	2. BL	48	25	13	10	0	60	3rd	233	162	Promoted to 1. BL
1992–93	1. BL	44	8	30	6	0	22	12th	118	207	Missed the Play-offs, avoided relegation, beat SERC 4:0 (best of seven series)
1993–94	1. BL	44	11	31	2	0	24	11th	119	214	Missed the Play-offs, avoided relegation, beat SERC 4:0 (best of seven series)
1994–95	DEL	44	10	32	2	0	22	18th	136	229	Missed the Play-offs
1995–96	DEL	50	11	34	3	2	27	17th	125	236	Missed the Play-offs
1996–97	DEL	50	26	19	4	1	57	4th	177	163	Lost the Semi-final to Kassel Huskies 1:3 (best of seven series)
1997–98	DEL	48	27	14	6	1	61	1st	179	139	Lost the Final to Adler Mannheim 1:3 (best of five series)

Note: W = Win, SOW – Shoot-out Win; L = Losses, SOL' – Shoot-out Losses

Point System: As of the 1998/99 season a new point scoring system was introduced: Win = 3 points; OT/SO Win = 2 points, OTL/SOL = 1point

Season	League	GP	W	SOW	L	SOL	Points	Finish	GF	GA	Postseason
1998–99	DEL	52	26	4	17	5	91	2nd	210	163	Lost the Semi-final to Adler Mannheim 1:3 (best of five series)
1999–00	DEL	56	23	2	30	3	70	13th	181	193	Missed the Play-offs
2000–01	DEL	60	19	6	31	4	73	14th	192	221	Missed the Play-offs
2001–02	DEL	60	25	6	24	5	92	7th	177	166	Lost the Quarterfinal to Adler Mannheim 1:3 (best of five series)
2002–03	DEL	52	30	5	8	9	109	1st	188	134	Lost the Semi-final to Krefeld Pinguine 1:3 (best of five series)
2003–04	DEL	52	29	5	12	6	103	1st	171	126	Lost the Final to Frankfurt Lions 1:3 (best of five series)
2004–05	DEL	52					101	2nd	166	141	Won the Final against Adler Mannheim 3:1 (best of five series)
2005–06	DEL	52	34	n/a	18	n/a	100	1st	181	142	Won the Final against DEG Metro Stars 3:0 (best of five series)
2006–07	DEL	52	24		28		77	9th	171	157	Lost preliminary round to Frankfurt Lions 1:2 (best of three series)

Note: GP = Games, W = Wins, OTW = Overtime Wins, SOW = Shoot-out Wins, L = Losses, OTL – Overtime Losses, SOL = Shoot-out Losses, GF = Goals For, GA = Goals Against

Point System: Win = 3 points; OT/SO Win = 2 points, OTL/SOL = 1point

Season	League	GP	W	OTW	SOW	L	OTL	SOL	Points	Finish	GF	GA	Postseason
2007–08	DEL	56	33	2	3	14	3	1	113	2nd	231	165	Won the Final against Kölner Haie 3:1 (best of five series)
2008–09	DEL	52	36	1	4	14	0	2	105	1st	214	143	Won the Final against DEG Metro Stars 3:1 (best of five series)
2009–10	DEL	52	36	2	4	11	1	2	123	1st	209	156	Lost the Quarterfinal to Augsburger Panther 2:3 (best of five series)
2010–11	DEL	52	24	1	5	16	1	5	90	3rd	161	138	Won the Final against Grizzly Adams Wolfsburg 3:0 (best of five series)
2011–12	DEL	52	26	3	4	16	2	1	95	1st	171	140	Won the Final against Adler Mannheim 3:2 (best of five series)
2012–13	DEL	52	23	2	3	18	3	3	85	4th	180	152	Won the Final against Kölner Haie 3:1 (best of five series)
2013–14	DEL	52	20	3	5	20	0	4	80	8th	152	152	Lost the preliminary round playoff to ERC Ingolstadt 1:2 (best of three series)
2014–15	DEL	52	20	2	5	21	2	2	78	9th	162	143	Lost the preliminary round playoff to Thomas Sabo Ice Tigers 1:2 (best of three series)
2015–16	DEL	52	27	4	0	18	0	3	92	2nd	152	136	Lost the Quarterfinal to Kölner Haie 3:4 (best of seven series)
2016–17	DEL	52	19	1	1	24	5	2	68	8th	125	148	Lost the Semi-final to EHC München 1:4 (best of seven series)
2017–18	DEL	52	29	2	2	13	1	5	101	2nd	169	131	Lost the Final to EHC München 3:4 (best of seven series)
2018–19	DEL	52	20	1	5	24	0	2	74	9th	146	164	Lost the Quarterfinal to EHC München 2:4 (best of seven series)
2019–20	DEL	52	25	5	2	15	3	2	94	4th	169	144	Cancelled due to the COVID-19 pandemic.
2020–21	DEL	38	23	0	1	9	2	3	76	3rd	137	91	Won the Final against Grizzlys Wolfsburg 2:1 (best of three series)
2021–22	DEL	55	34	0	1	12	4	4	112	1st	194	139	Won the Final against EHC München 3:1 (best of five series)
2022–23	DEL	56	18	4	2	22	3	7	76	11th	160	171	Missed the Play-offs
2023–24	DEL	52	29	3	3	14	0	3	102	2nd	181	134	Won the Final against Fischtown Pinguins 4:1 (best of seven series)
2024–25	DEL	52	29	5	2	10	2	4	107	2nd	203	150	Won the Final against Kölner Haie 4:1 (best of seven series)
2025–26	DEL	52	23	4	2	19	2	2	85	6th	171	157	Won the Final against Adler Mannheim 4:1 (best of seven series)

== Club statistics ==
Note: this section includes only statistics accumulated between 1990 and the end of the 2011/12 season.

Points leaders
Player	Seasons	Games	Goals	Assists	Points
Sven Felski	1992–2012	857	209	326	535
Steve Walker	2000–2011	508	179	346	525
Mark Beaufait	2002–2009	223	110	211	321
Denis Pederson	2003–2012	348	131	186	317
Stefan Ustorf	2004–2012	363	94	185	279

Goals
Player	Seasons	Games	Goals
Sven Felski	1992–2012	857	209
Steve Walker	2000–2011	508	179
Denis Pederson	2003–2012	348	131
Chris Govedaris	1996–2001	247	117
Mark Beaufait	2002–2009	223	110

Assists
Name	Seasons	Games	Assists
Steve Walker	2000–2011	508	346
Sven Felski	1992–2012	857	326
Mark Beaufait	2002–2009	223	211
Marc Fortier	1996–2002	311	198
Denis Pederson	2003–2012	348	186

Most Points in a Single Season
Name	Season	Games	Goals	Assists	Points
Mark Jooris	1991–1992	50	54	69	123
Steve Walker	2007–2008	53	27	58	85
Jiří Dopita	1994–1995	42	28	40	68
Thomas Graul	1991–1992	47	28	32	60
Alex Hicks	2000–2001	56	27	31	58

Most Penalty Minutes
Name	Seasons	Games	PIM
Sven Felski	1992–2012	857	1565
Rob Leask	1996–2006	463	797
Denis Pederson	2003–2012	345	527
Mario Chitaroni	1996–2000	192	512
Yvon Corriveau	1997–2004	237	492

Play-off scoring leaders
Player	Seasons	Games	Goals	Assists	Points
Steve Walker	2000–2011	85	34	33	67
Mark Beaufait	2002–2009	66	24	38	62
Stefan Ustorf	2002–2012	63	17	43	60
Denis Pederson	2000–2012	65	28	28	56
Sven Feslki	1992–2012	89	15	33	48

== Sponsors ==
- Berliner Rundfunk
- Berliner Volksbank
- Bito AG
- Galeria Kaufhof
- Gasag
- Hasseröder
- Hornbach
- Ramada

== See also ==
- Sport in Berlin
