= 1966 Ice Hockey World Championships =

1966 edition of the World Ice Hockey Championships

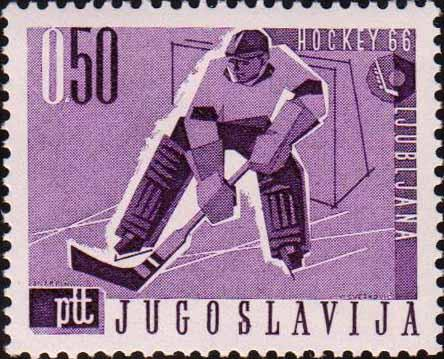
- Stamp of Yugoslavia dedicated to the 1966 World Ice Hockey Championships

Tournament details
- Host country: Yugoslavia
- Dates: 3–13 March
- Teams: 8

Final positions
- Champions: Soviet Union (6th title)
- Runners-up: Czechoslovakia
- Third place: Canada
- Fourth place: Sweden

Tournament statistics
- Games played: 28
- Goals scored: 205 (7.32 per game)
- Attendance: 147,492 (5,268 per game)
- Scoring leader: (Soviet Union) Veniamin Aleksandrov (17 points)

The 1966 Ice Hockey World Championships was the 33rd edition of the Ice Hockey World Championships. The tournament was held in Hala Tivoli, Ljubljana, SR Slovenia, SFR Yugoslavia from 3 to 13 March 1966. For the fourth straight year, the Soviet Union won the tournament. For the Soviets, it was their sixth World and tenth European title. Czechoslovakia beat both Canada and Sweden two to one, to take the Silver, while the Swedes' historic loss to East Germany helped put them fourth behind Canada for the Bronze.

The lower two tiers (Groups B and C) were formalized, so there would be no more qualifying tournaments with promotion and relegation taking places between these two tournaments as well. West Germany won all their games to return to the top level of competition while Great Britain went winless and was replaced by Group C winner Italy.

== Qualifying round Group B/C (Bucharest Romania) ==
Pos	Team	Pld	W	D	L	GF	GA	GD	Pts
1	Romania	2	2	0	0	17	5	+12	4
2	Italy	2	1	0	1	12	8	+4	2
3	France	2	0	0	2	5	21	−16	0

10 December 1965	Romania	11–3	France

11 December 1965	Italy	10–2	France

12 December 1965	Romania	6–2	Italy

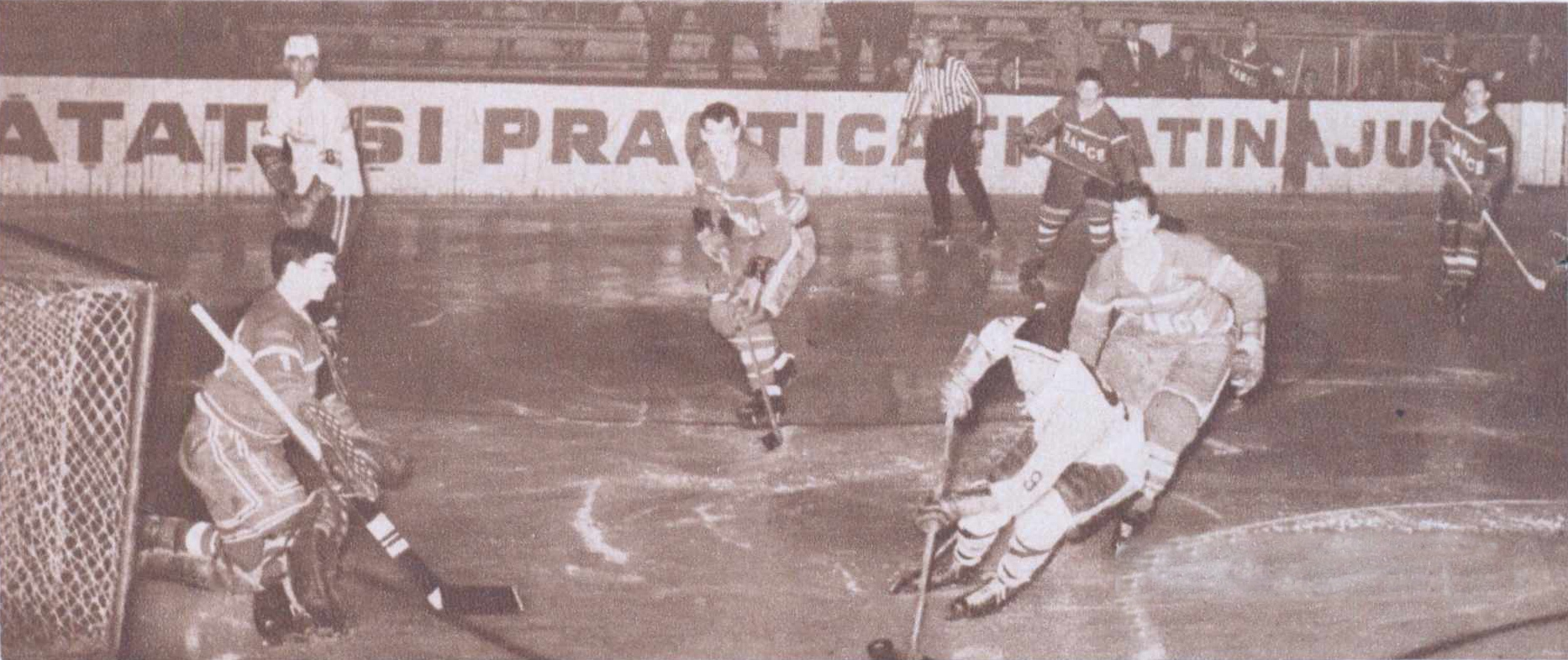
Italy - France

Romania qualified in Group B

Italy and France qualified in Group C

== World Championship Group A (Ljubljana) ==
The Canadian national team players wanted to withdraw from the World Championships in protest of the officiating in a loss to the Czechoslovak national team in which Canada was the more-penalized team and had two goals disallowed. The team's manager Father David Bauer stayed up all night with the team and talked them into continuing to avoid a national embarrassment and sanctions against the team.

=== Final round ===
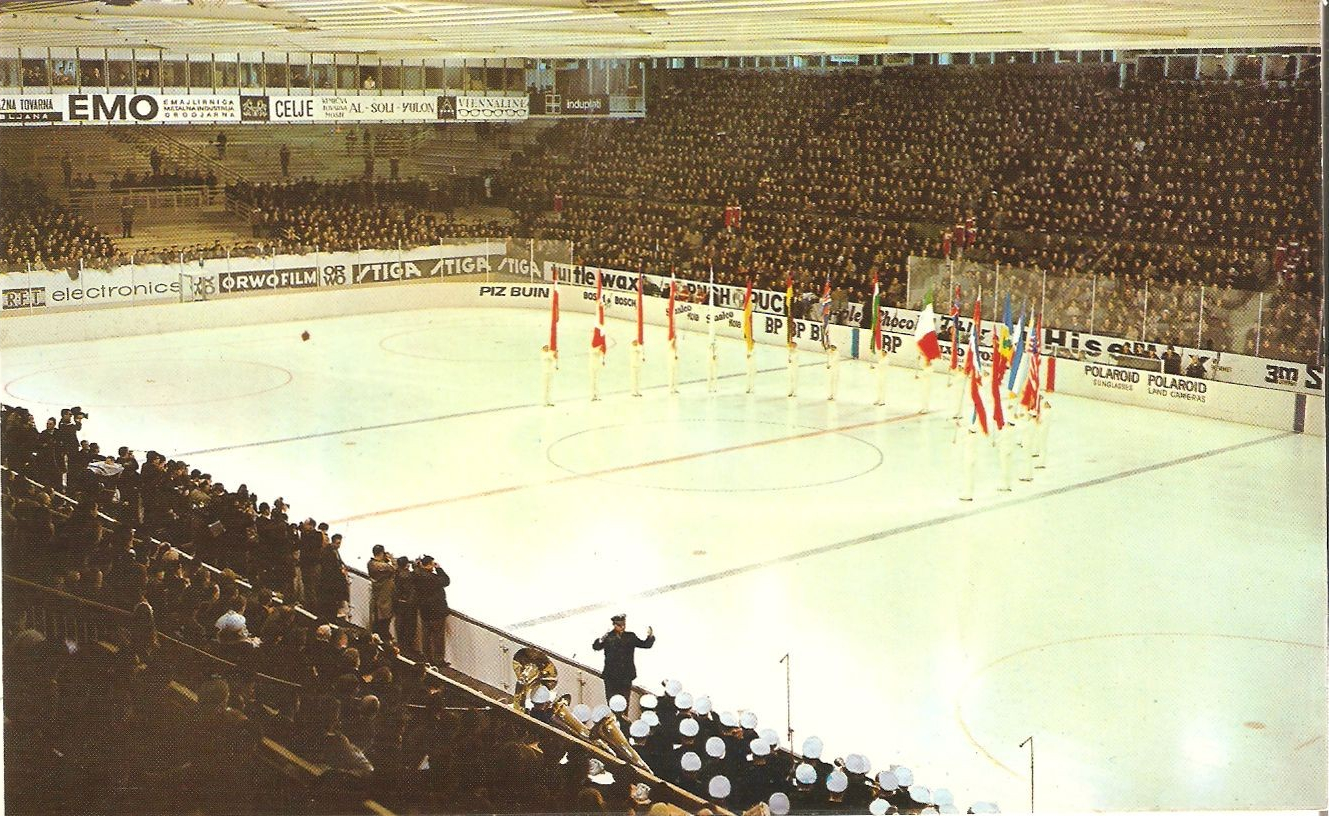
1966 World Championship opening ceremony

Pos	Team	Pld	W	D	L	GF	GA	GD	Pts
1	Soviet Union	7	6	1	0	55	7	+48	13
2	Czechoslovakia	7	6	0	1	32	15	+17	12
3	Canada	7	5	0	2	33	10	+23	10
4	Sweden	7	3	1	3	26	17	+9	7
5	East Germany	7	3	0	4	12	30	−18	6
6	United States	7	2	0	5	18	39	−21	4
7	Finland	7	2	0	5	18	43	−25	4
8	Poland	7	0	0	7	11	44	−33	0

Poland was relegated to Group B for 1967.

3 March	Soviet Union	8–1	Poland

3 March	Czechoslovakia	6–0	East Germany

3 March	Sweden	5–1	Finland

3 March	United States	2–7	Canada

5 March	Canada	6–0	Poland

5 March	Czechoslovakia	8–1	Finland

5 March	Sweden	1–4	East Germany

5 March	Soviet Union	11–0	United States

6 March	Czechoslovakia	6–1	Poland

6 March	Canada	9–1	Finland

6 March	Sweden	6–1	United States

6 March	Soviet Union	10–0	East Germany

8 March	Sweden	8–2	Poland

8 March	Soviet Union	13–2	Finland

8 March	Czechoslovakia	7–4	United States

8 March	Canada	6–0	East Germany

9 March	Poland	0–4	East Germany

9 March	United States	1–4	Finland

10 March	Canada	1–2	Czechoslovakia

10 March	Soviet Union	3–3	Sweden

11 March	Finland	6–3	Poland

11 March	East Germany	0–4	United States

11 March	Czechoslovakia	2–1	Sweden

11 March	Soviet Union	3–0	Canada

12 March	Poland	4–6	United States

12 March	East Germany	4–3	Finland

13 March	Canada	4–2	Sweden

13 March	Soviet Union	7–1	Czechoslovakia

== World Championship Group B (Zagreb) ==
=== Final round ===
Pos	Team	Pld	W	D	L	GF	GA	GD	Pts
9	West Germany	7	7	0	0	34	12	+22	14
10	Romania	7	5	1	1	29	16	+13	11
11	Yugoslavia	7	4	2	1	25	23	+2	10
12	Norway	7	4	0	3	28	17	+11	8
13	Austria	7	3	0	4	25	30	−5	6
14	Switzerland	7	2	0	5	24	26	−2	4
15	Hungary	7	1	0	6	19	30	−11	2
16	Great Britain	7	0	1	6	15	45	−30	1

West Germany was promoted to the top level while Great Britain was relegated to Group C for 1967 (but did not participate again until 1971).

3 March	Norway	12–2	Great Britain

3 March	Switzerland	3–4	Romania

3 March	West Germany	6–3	Austria

3 March	Yugoslavia	6–4	Hungary

4 March	West Germany	4–1	Romania

4 March	Switzerland	6–3	Great Britain

4 March	Hungary	2–7	Austria

4 March	Yugoslavia	2–1	Norway

6 March	Norway	0–4	Romania

6 March	Hungary	8–1	Great Britain

6 March	Austria	7–6	Switzerland

6 March	Yugoslavia	2–6	West Germany

7 March	Austria	3–4	Norway

7 March	Hungary	2–4	Romania

7 March	West Germany	10–4	Great Britain

7 March	Yugoslavia	3–2	Switzerland

9 March	Austria	1–7	Romania

9 March	Switzerland	0–4	West Germany

9 March	Hungary	2–5	Norway

9 March	Yugoslavia	3–3	Great Britain

10 March	Norway	4–1	Switzerland

10 March	Hungary	0–1	West Germany

11 March	Austria	2–1	Great Britain

11 March	Yugoslavia	5–5	Romania

12 March	West Germany	3–2	Norway

12 March	Hungary	1–6	Switzerland

12 March	Great Britain	1–4	Romania

12 March	Yugoslavia	4–2	Austria

== World Championship Group C (Jesenice) ==
A Yugoslav 'B' team participated unofficially in the tournament, playing games against each of the three other participating nations. This was South Africa's last appearance in the World Championships until 1992.

=== Final round ===
Pos	Team	Pld	W	D	L	GF	GA	GD	Pts
17	Italy	5	5	0	0	54	8	+46	10
18	Denmark	5	2	1	2	21	21	0	5
19	Yugoslavia B	3	1	1	1	11	13	−2	3
20	South Africa	5	0	0	5	4	50	−46	0

Italy was promoted to Group B, France decided not to participate, Yugoslavia B team participated instead of France

3 March	Denmark	9–0	South Africa

4 March	Italy	17–0	South Africa

5 March	Yugoslavia B	5–5	Denmark

6 March	South Africa	2–18	Italy

7 March	Italy	7–1	Denmark

8 March	Denmark	5–12	Italy

10 March	Yugoslavia B	4–1	South Africa

11 March	South Africa	2–6	Denmark

12 March	Yugoslavia B	2–7	Italy

== Ranking and statistics ==
1966 IIHF World Championship winners

Soviet Union
6th title

=== Tournament Awards ===
- Best players selected by the directorate:
  - Best Goaltender: (Canada) Seth Martin
  - Best Defenceman: (Soviet Union) Alexander Ragulin
  - Best Forward: (Soviet Union) Konstantin Loktev
- Media All-Star Team:
  - Goaltender: (Canada) Seth Martin
  - Defence: (Canada) Gary Begg, (Soviet Union) Alexander Ragulin
  - Forwards: (Soviet Union) Veniamin Alexandrov, (Canada) Fran Huck, (Soviet Union) Konstantin Loktev

=== Final standings ===
The final standings of the tournament according to IIHF:

1st place, gold medalist(s)	Soviet Union
2nd place, silver medalist(s)	Czechoslovakia
3rd place, bronze medalist(s)	Canada
4	Sweden
5	East Germany
6	United States
7	Finland
8	Poland

=== European championships final standings ===
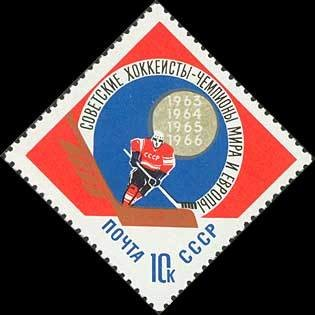
USSR stamp

Please note: At the time of the championship Sweden was awarded the bronze, however, East Germany should have won because of their better record amongst only European clubs. In 1999 this mistake was corrected and living players were presented with the medals they were supposed to have won.

The final standings of the European championships according to IIHF:

1st place, gold medalist(s)	Soviet Union
2nd place, silver medalist(s)	Czechoslovakia
3rd place, bronze medalist(s)	East Germany
4	Sweden
5	Finland
6	Poland
