= List of flag bearers for Mongolia at the Olympics =

Mongolia at the Olympics
- IOC code: MGL
- NOC: Mongolian National Olympic Committee
- Website: www.olympic.mn (in Mongolian)
- Medals: Gold 2 Silver 12 Bronze 17 Total 31

Summer appearances
- 1964; 1968; 1972; 1976; 1980; 1984; 1988; 1992; 1996; 2000; 2004; 2008; 2012; 2016; 2020; 2024

Winter appearances
- 1964; 1968; 1972; 1976; 1980; 1984; 1988; 1992; 1994; 1998; 2002; 2006; 2010; 2014; 2018; 2022; 2026

This is a list of flag bearers who have represented Mongolia at the Olympics.

Flag bearers carry the national flag of their country at the opening ceremony of the Olympic Games.

#	Event year	Season	Flag bearer	Sport
1	1964	Winter	Luvsansharavyn Tsend	Speed skating
2	1964	Summer	Ch. Naydan	Cycling coach
3	1968	Winter	Luvsansharavyn Tsend	Speed skating
4	1968	Summer	Khorloogiin Bayanmönkh	Wrestling
5	1972	Winter	Luvsansharavyn Tsend	Speed skating
6	1972	Summer	Bazarragchaagiin Jamsran	Wrestling
7	1976	Summer	Zevegiin Oidov	Wrestling
8	1980	Winter	Luvsandashiin Dorj	Cross-country skiing
9	1980	Summer	Zevegiin Düvchin	Wrestling
10	1984	Winter	Luvsandashiin Dorj	Cross-country skiing
11	1988	Winter	Davaagiin Enkhee	Cross-country skiing
12	1988	Summer	Badmaanyambuugiin Bat-Erdene	Judo
13	1992	Winter	Ziitsagaany Ganbat	Cross-country skiing
14	1992	Summer	Badmaanyambuugiin Bat-Erdene	Judo
15	1994	Winter	Batchuluuny Bat–Orgil	Short track speed skating
16	1996	Summer	Dolgorsürengiin Sumyaabazar	Wrestling
17	1998	Winter	Boldyn Sansarbileg	Short track speed skating
18	2000	Summer	Badmaanyambuugiin Bat-Erdene	Judo
19	2002	Winter	Jargalyn Erdenetülkhüür	Cross-country skiing
20	2004	Summer	Damdinsürengiin Nyamkhüü	Judo
21	2006	Winter	Khürelbaataryn Khash-Erdene	Cross-country skiing
22	2008	Summer	Makhgalyn Bayarjavkhlan	Judo
23	2010	Winter	Erdene-Ochiryn Ochirsüren	Cross-country skiing
24	2012	Summer	Ser-Od Bat-Ochiryn	Athletics
25	2014	Winter	Bold Byambadorj	Cross-country skiing
26	2016	Summer	Temuulen Battulga	Judo
27	2018	Winter	Achbadrakh Batmunkh	Cross-country skiing
28	2020	Summer	Khulan Onolbaatar	Basketball
28	2020	Summer	Duurenbayar Ulziibayar	Judo
29	2022	Winter	Enkhtuul Ariunsanaa	Cross-country skiing
29	2022	Winter	Achbadrakh Batmunkh	Cross-country skiing
30	2024	Summer	Ser-Od Bat-Ochiryn	Athletics
30	2024	Summer	Yesügen Oyuntsetseg	Boxing

== See also ==
- Mongolia at the Olympics
