= Mongolia at the 1964 Winter Olympics =

- IOC code: MGL
- NOC: Mongolian National Olympic Committee
- Website: www.olympic.mn (in Mongolian)

in Innsbruck
- Competitors: 13 (10 men, 3 women) in 3 sports
- Flag bearer: Luvsansharavyn Tsend
- Medals: Gold 0 Silver 0 Bronze 0 Total 0

Winter Olympics appearances (overview)
- 1964; 1968; 1972; 1976; 1980; 1984; 1988; 1992; 1994; 1998; 2002; 2006; 2010; 2014; 2018; 2022; 2026; 2030

Mongolia competed in the Winter Olympic Games for the first time at the 1964 Winter Olympics in Innsbruck, Austria.

A group of cross-country skiers from Mongolia traveled to the Olympics, unaware of any application process. They were allowed to compete.

== Biathlon ==
Men

Event	Athlete	Time	Misses	Adjusted time ^{1}	Rank
20 km	Tsambyn Danzan	1'36:45.6	15	2'06:45.6	49
20 km	Tudeviin Lkhamsüren	1'37:10.1	8	1'53:10.1	44
20 km	Bizyaagiin Dashgai	1'31:26.0	10	1'51:26.0	42
20 km	Bayanjavyn Damdinjav	1'32:19.7	7	1'46:19.7	38

^{1} Two minutes added per miss.

== Cross-country skiing ==
Men

Event	Athlete	Race	
Event	Athlete	Time	Rank
15 km	Dambadarjaagiin Baadai	1'05:23.6	68
15 km	Sodnomtserengiin Natsagdorj	1'02:23.4	64
15 km	Banzragchiin Zundui	1'02:21.5	63
15 km	Luvsan-Ayuushiin Dashdemberel	1'00:08.1	54
30 km	Bayanjavyn Damdinjav	1:51.25.2	60
30 km	Banzragchiin Zundui	1'49:27.3	59
30 km	Bizyaagiin Dashgai	1'49:24.7	58
30 km	Sodnomtserengiin Natsagdorj	1'49:07.1	57

Women

Event	Athlete	Race	
Event	Athlete	Time	Rank
5 km	Dorjgotovyn Pürevloov	24:55.8	31
5 km	Jigjeegiin Javzandulam	22:57.5	30
10 km	Dorjgotovyn Pürevloov	55:03.6	35
10 km	Jigjeegiin Javzandulam	54:47.6	34

== Speed skating ==
Men

Event	Athlete	Race	
Event	Athlete	Time	Rank
500 m	Luvsanlkhagvyn Dashnyam	44.1	38
1500 m	Luvsanlkhagvyn Dashnyam	2:23.9	46
5000 m	Luvsansharavyn Tsend	8:23.9	31
10,000 m	Luvsansharavyn Tsend	17:12.4	25

Women

Event	Athlete	Race	
Event	Athlete	Time	Rank
1000 m	Tsedenjavyn Lkhamjav	1:43.5	24
3000 m	Tsedenjavyn Lkhamjav	5:42.6	20
