= Sweden at the 1964 Winter Olympics =

- IOC code: SWE
- NOC: Swedish Olympic Committee
- Website: www.sok.se (in Swedish and English)

in Innsbruck
- Competitors: 57 (49 men, 8 women) in 8 sports
- Flag bearers: Carl-Gustav Briandt, cross-country skiing (official)
- Medals Ranked 7th: Gold 3 Silver 3 Bronze 1 Total 7

Winter Olympics appearances (overview)
- 1924; 1928; 1932; 1936; 1948; 1952; 1956; 1960; 1964; 1968; 1972; 1976; 1980; 1984; 1988; 1992; 1994; 1998; 2002; 2006; 2010; 2014; 2018; 2022; 2026

Sweden participated at the 1964 Winter Olympics in Innsbruck, Austria, sending 57 representatives to compete in eight different events. The team finished seventh overall, winning seven medals including three golds. Five of the team's medals came from cross-country skiing and one each from speed skating and men's ice hockey.

== Medalists ==
Medal	Name	Sport	Event
Gold	Sixten Jernberg	Cross-country skiing	Men's 50 km
Gold	Karl-Åke Asph; Sixten Jernberg; Janne Stefansson; Assar Rönnlund	Cross-country skiing	Men's 4 × 10 km relay
Gold	Jonny Nilsson	Speed skating	Men's 10 000 m
Silver	Assar Rönnlund	Cross-country skiing	Men's 50 km
Silver	Barbro Martinsson; Britt Strandberg; Toini Gustafsson	Cross-country skiing	Women's 3 x 5 km relay
Silver	Sweden men's national ice hockey team: Kjell Svensson; Lennart Häggroth; Gert Blomé; Nils Johansson; Roland Stoltz; Bert-Ola Nordlander; Nils Nilsson; Ronald Pettersson; Lars-Eric Lundvall; Eilert Määttä; Anders Andersson; Ulf Sterner; Carl-Göran Öberg; Sven Johansson; Uno Öhrlund; Hans Mild; Lennart Johansson	Ice hockey	Men's competition
Bronze	Sixten Jernberg	Cross-country skiing	Men's 15 km

== Alpine skiing ==
Men

Athlete	Event	Race	
Athlete	Event	Time	Rank
Lars Olsson	Downhill	DNF	–
Rune Lindström	Downhill	DNF	–
Olle Rolén	Downhill	2:31.14	37
Bengt-Erik Grahn	Downhill	2:29.29	31
Bengt-Erik Grahn	Giant Slalom	DSQ	–
Olle Rolén	Giant Slalom	2:00.01	30
Rune Lindström	Giant Slalom	1:57.06	24

Men's slalom

Athlete	Qualifying				Final					
Athlete	Time 1	Rank	Time 2	Rank	Time 1	Rank	Time 2	Rank	Total	Rank
Lars Olsson	59.80	45	56.66	14 QF	1:18.74	34	DSQ	–	DSQ	–
Olle Rolén	58.39	42	57.17	16 QF	1:16.14	25	1:06.94	30	2:23.08	28
Bengt-Erik Grahn	54.99	24 QF	–	–	DSQ	–	–	–	DSQ	–
Rune Lindström	54.43	16 QF	–	–	1:16.00	24	1:06.68	28	2:22.68	26

== Biathlon ==
Men

Event	Athlete	Time	Misses	Adjusted time ^{1}	Rank
20 km	Sten Eriksson	1'23:27.8	6	1'35:27.8	25
20 km	Sven-Olof Axelsson	1'21:13.6	6	1'33:13.6	17
20 km	Sture Ohlin	1'25:46.0	2	1'29:46.0	12
20 km	John Güttke	1'24:02.4	2	1'28:02.4	9

^{1} Two minutes added per miss.

== Bobsleigh ==
Sled	Athletes	Event	Run 1		Run 2		Run 3		Run 4		Total	
Sled	Athletes	Event	Time	Rank	Time	Rank	Time	Rank	Time	Rank	Time	Rank
SWE-1	Kjell Lutteman; Heino Freyberg	Two-man	1:06.81	9	1:06.99	12	1:07.93	18	1:07.20	11	4:28.93	12
SWE-2	Jan-Erik Åkerström; Carl-Erik Eriksson	Two-man	1:08.01	19	1:11.81	21	DNF	–	–	–	DNF	–

Sled	Athletes	Event	Run 1		Run 2		Run 3		Run 4		Total	
Sled	Athletes	Event	Time	Rank	Time	Rank	Time	Rank	Time	Rank	Time	Rank
SWE-1	Kjell Holmström; Walter Aronson; Kjell Lutteman; Carl-Erik Eriksson	Four-man	1:04.26	8	1:04.04	4	1:04.56	8	1:06.38	16	4:19.24	11

== Cross-country skiing ==
Men

Event	Athlete	Race	
Event	Athlete	Time	Rank
15 km	Lars Olsson	52:57.9	16
15 km	Assar Rönnlund	52:35.5	13
15 km	Janne Stefansson	51:46.4	5
15 km	Sixten Jernberg	51:42.2	3rd place, bronze medalist(s)
30 km	Torsten Samuelsson	1'33:07.8	9
30 km	Assar Rönnlund	1'32:43.6	7
30 km	Sixten Jernberg	1'32:39.6	5
30 km	Janne Stefansson	1'32:34.8	4
50 km	Melcher Risberg	2'48:03.0	10
50 km	Janne Stefansson	2'45:36.6	4
50 km	Assar Rönnlund	2'44:58.2	2nd place, silver medalist(s)
50 km	Sixten Jernberg	2'43:52.6	1st place, gold medalist(s)

Men's 4 × 10 km relay

Athletes	Race	
Athletes	Time	Rank
Karl-Åke Asph; Sixten Jernberg; Janne Stefansson; Assar Rönnlund	2'18:34.6	1st place, gold medalist(s)

Women

Event	Athlete	Race	
Event	Athlete	Time	Rank
5 km	Gun Ädel	26:09.0	32
5 km	Britt Strandberg	19:07.5	11
5 km	Barbro Martinsson	18:26.4	7
5 km	Toini Gustafsson	18:25.7	6
10 km	Gun Ädel	44:18.9	17
10 km	Barbro Martinsson	42:36.1	11
10 km	Toini Gustafsson	41:41.1	8
10 km	Britt Strandberg	40:54.0	4

Women's 3 x 5 km relay

Athletes	Race	
Athletes	Time	Rank
Barbro Martinsson; Britt Strandberg; Toini Gustafsson	1'01:27.0	2nd place, silver medalist(s)

== Figure skating ==
Women

Athlete	CF	FS	Points	Places	Rank
Ann Margret Frei-Käck	26	13	1661.1	191	21

== Ice hockey ==
Summary

Team	Event	First round	Medal round / Consolation round							
Team	Event	Opposition Score	Opposition Score	Opposition Score	Opposition Score	Opposition Score	Opposition Score	Opposition Score	Opposition Score	Rank
**Sweden men's**	Men's tournament	Italy; **W** 12–2	Canada; **L** 1–3	United States; **W** 7–4	Finland; **W** 7–0	Germany; **W** 10–2	Switzerland; **W** 12–0	Soviet Union; **L** 2–4	Czechoslovakia; **W** 8–3	2nd place, silver medalist(s)

=== First round ===
Winners (in bold) qualified for the Group A to play for 1st-8th places. Teams, which lost their qualification matches, played in Group B for 9th-16th places.

Team 1	Score	Team 2
**Sweden**	12–2	Italy

=== Medal round ===
Rank	Team	Pld	W	L	T	GF	GA	Pts
1	Soviet Union	7	7	0	0	54	10	14
2	Sweden (silver)	7	5	2	0	47	16	10
3	Czechoslovakia	7	5	2	0	38	19	10
4	Canada	7	5	2	0	32	17	10
5	United States	7	2	5	0	29	33	4
6	Finland	7	2	5	0	10	31	4
7	Germany	7	2	5	0	13	49	4
8	Switzerland	7	0	7	0	9	57	0

- Canada 3–1 Sweden
- Sweden 7–4 USA
- Sweden 7–0 Finland
- Sweden 10–2 Germany (UTG)
- Sweden 12–0 Switzerland
- Soviet Union 4–2 Sweden
- Sweden 8–3 Czechoslovakia

**Contestants**; Kjell Svensson; Lennart Häggroth; Gert Blomé; Nils Johansson; Roland Stoltz; Bert-Ola Nordlander; Nils Nilsson; Ronald Pettersson; Lars-Eric Lundvall; Eilert Määttä; Anders Andersson; Ulf Sterner; Carl-Göran Öberg; Sven Johansson; Uno Öhrlund; Hans Mild; Lennart Johansson

=== Leading scorers ===
Rk	Team	GP	G	A	Pts
1st	(Sweden) Sven Johansson	7	8	3	11
2nd	(Sweden) Ulf Sterner	7	6	5	11
8th	(Sweden) Anders Andersson	7	7	2	9

== Ski jumping ==
Athletes performed three jumps, the best two were counted and are shown here.

Athlete	Event	Jump 1		Jump 2		Total	
Athlete	Event	Distance	Points	Distance	Points	Points	Rank
Holger Karlsson	Normal hill	74.0	96.7	72.0	97.1	193.8	35
Olle Martinsson	Normal hill	74.0	98.7	72.0	96.1	194.8	32
Kjell Sjöberg	Normal hill	72.0	98.4	71.5	96.2	194.6	33
Kurt Elimä	Normal hill	75.0	104.1	75.0	104.8	208.9	7
Holger Karlsson	Large hill	73.0	75.4	64.5	75.7	151.1	52
Kurt Elimä	Large hill	89.5	100.1	81.5	95.2	195.3	29
Kjell Sjöberg	Large hill	90.0	103.8	85.0	110.6	214.4	5
Olle Martinsson	Large hill	84.0	99.7	76.0	93.8	193.5	32

== Speed skating ==
Men

Event	Athlete	Race	
Event	Athlete	Time	Rank
500 m	Manne Lavås	42.7	29
500 m	Bo Ollander	42.6	27
500 m	Björn Lekman	42.1	22
500 m	Heike Hedlund	41.0	7
1500 m	Bo Ollander	2:17.1	28
1500 m	Manne Lavås	2:16.2	24
1500 m	Ivar Nilsson	2:15.6	19
1500 m	Örjan Sandler	2:15.4	18
5000 m	Örjan Sandler	8:05.3	19
5000 m	Ivar Nilsson	7:49.0	7
5000 m	Jonny Nilsson	7:48.4	6
10,000 m	Örjan Sandler	16:56.9	17
10,000 m	Ivar Nilsson	16:40.3	10
10,000 m	Jonny Nilsson	15:50.1	1st place, gold medalist(s)

Women

Event	Athlete	Race	
Event	Athlete	Time	Rank
500 m	Christina Lindblom-Scherling	47.8	11
500 m	Inger Eriksson	47.3	9
500 m	Gunilla Jacobsson	46.5	6
1000 m	Christina Lindblom-Scherling	1:39.5	14
1000 m	Inger Eriksson	1:37.8	9
1000 m	Gunilla Jacobsson	1:36.5	6
1500 m	Inger Eriksson	2:32.0	12
1500 m	Gunilla Jacobsson	2:31.9	11
1500 m	Christina Lindblom-Scherling	2:29.4	6
3000 m	Gunilla Jacobsson	5:39.2	15
3000 m	Inger Eriksson	5:32.6	14
3000 m	Christina Lindblom-Scherling	5:27.6	9
