= Mongolia at the 1968 Winter Olympics =

- IOC code: MGL (MON used at these Games)
- NOC: Mongolian National Olympic Committee
- Website: www.olympic.mn (in Mongolian)

in Grenoble
- Competitors: 7 (men) in 3 sports
- Flag bearer: Luvsansharavyn Tsend
- Medals: Gold 0 Silver 0 Bronze 0 Total 0

Winter Olympics appearances (overview)
- 1964; 1968; 1972; 1976; 1980; 1984; 1988; 1992; 1994; 1998; 2002; 2006; 2010; 2014; 2018; 2022; 2026

Mongolia competed at the 1968 Winter Olympics in Grenoble, France.

== Biathlon ==
Men

| Event | Athlete | Time | Penalties | Adjusted time ^{1} | Rank |
|---|---|---|---|---|---|
| 20 km | Bizyaagiin Dashgai | 1'26:55.8 | 8 | 1'34:55.8 | 52 |
| 20 km | Bayanjavyn Damdinjav | 1'24:30.7 | 6 | 1'30:30.7 | 38 |

^{1} One minute added per close miss (a hit in the outer ring), two minutes added per complete miss.

== Cross-country skiing ==
Men

| Event | Athlete | Race | |
| Event | Athlete | Time | Rank |
|---|---|---|---|
| 15 km | Luvsan-Ayuushiin Dashdemberel | 54:46.4 | 54 |
| 15 km | Gendgeegiin Batmönkh | 54:21.3 | 52 |
| 30 km | Gendgeegiin Batmönkh | 1'51:39.1 | 56 |
| 30 km | Luvsan-Ayuushiin Dashdemberel | 1'50:52.7 | 54 |

== Speed skating ==
Men

| Event | Athlete | Race | |
| Event | Athlete | Time | Rank |
|---|---|---|---|
| 500 m | Luvsanlkhagvyn Dashnyam | 43.0 | 38 |
| 1500 m | Büjiin Jalbaa | 2:18.0 | 52 |
| 1500 m | Luvsanlkhagvyn Dashnyam | 2:16.7 | 49 |
| 5000 m | Luvsansharavyn Tsend | 8:15.8 | 36 |
