= Speed skating at the 1964 Winter Olympics – Men's 500 metres =

Speed skating at the Olympics

Men's 500 metres speed skating at the IX Olympic Winter Games
- Pictogram for speed skating
- Venue: Eisschnelllaufbahn Innsbruck
- Date: 4 February 1964
- Competitors: 44 from 19 nations
- Winning time: 40.1 OR

Medalists
1st place, gold medalist(s)		Terry McDermott	United States
2nd place, silver medalist(s)		Alv Gjestvang	Norway
2nd place, silver medalist(s)		Yevgeny Grishin	Soviet Union
2nd place, silver medalist(s)		Vladimir Orlov	Soviet Union

The men's 500 metres in speed skating at the 1964 Winter Olympics took place on 4 February, at the Eisschnelllaufbahn Innsbruck.

== Records ==
Prior to this competition, the existing world and Olympic records were as follows:

World record	Yevgeny Grishin (URS)	39.5	Alma-Ata, Kazakh SSR, Soviet Union	28 January 1963
Olympic record	Yevgeny Grishin (URS); Yevgeny Grishin (URS)	40.2	Cortina d'Ampezzo, Italy; Squaw Valley, United States	28 January 1956; 24 February 1960

The following new Olympic record was set.

Date	Athlete	Time	OR	WR
4 February	Terry McDermott (USA)	40.1	OR	

== Results ==
Rank	Athlete	Country	Time	Notes
1st place, gold medalist(s)	Terry McDermott	United States	40.1	OR
2nd place, silver medalist(s)	Alv Gjestvang	Norway	40.6	
2nd place, silver medalist(s)	Yevgeny Grishin	Soviet Union	40.6	
2nd place, silver medalist(s)	Vladimir Orlov	Soviet Union	40.6	
5	Keiichi Suzuki	Japan	40.7	
6	Eddie Rudolph, Jr.	United States	40.9	
7	Heike Hedlund	Sweden	41.0	
8	Bill Disney	United States	41.1	
8	Villy Haugen	Norway	41.1	
10	Hroar Elvenes	Norway	41.4	
10	Raymond Fonvieille	France	41.4	
10	Rafael Grach	Soviet Union	41.4	
10	Simo Rinne	Finland	41.4	
14	Tom Gray	United States	41.5	
15	Boris Gulyayev	Soviet Union	41.7	
16	Helmut Kuhnert	United Team of Germany	41.8	
16	Pekka Lattunen	Finland	41.8	
16	Fumio Nagakubo	Japan	41.8	
19	Juhani Järvinen	Finland	41.9	
19	Kim Zin-hook	North Korea	41.9	
21	Magne Thomassen	Norway	42.0	
22	Björn Lekman	Sweden	42.1	
23	Toivo Salonen	Finland	42.2	
24	Herbert Höfl	United Team of Germany	42.3	
24	Günther Tilch	United Team of Germany	42.3	
26	André Kouprianoff	France	42.5	
27	Terry Malkin	Great Britain	42.6	
27	Bo Ollander	Sweden	42.6	
29	Manne Lavås	Sweden	42.7	
30	Ri Sung-ryool	North Korea	43.0	
31	Elio Locatelli	Italy	43.1	
32	Oldřich Teplý	Czechoslovakia	43.2	
33	François Brueren	Belgium	43.4	
33	Günter Traub	United Team of Germany	43.4	Ŕ
35	Manfred Zojer	Austria	43.5	
36	Peter Toyfl	Austria	43.7	
37	Mihály Martos	Hungary	44.0	
38	Luvsanlkhagvyn Dashnyam	Mongolia	44.1	
39	Ralf Olin	Canada	44.2	
40	György Ivánkai	Hungary	44.3	
41	Satoshi Shinpo	Japan	44.4	
42	Choi Yeong-Bae	South Korea	44.8	
43	Jean-Pierre Guéron	Switzerland	44.9	
44	Thomas Dawson	Great Britain	45.2	
