= Mongolia at the 2002 Winter Olympics =

- IOC code: MGL
- NOC: Mongolian National Olympic Committee
- Website: www.olympic.mn (in Mongolian)

in Salt Lake City
- Competitors: 4 (3 men, 1 woman) in 2 sports
- Flag bearer: Jargalyn Erdenetülkhüür
- Medals: Gold 0 Silver 0 Bronze 0 Total 0

Winter Olympics appearances (overview)
- 1964; 1968; 1972; 1976; 1980; 1984; 1988; 1992; 1994; 1998; 2002; 2006; 2010; 2014; 2018; 2022; 2026

Mongolia sent a delegation to compete at the 2002 Winter Olympics in Salt Lake City, United States from 8–24 February 2002. This was Mongolia's tenth time participating in a Winter Olympic Games. The delegation consisted of four athletes, two cross-country skiers; Davaagiin Enkhee and Jargalyn Erdenetülkhüür, as well as two short-track speed skating competitors; Battulgyn Oktyabri and Ganbatyn Jargalanchuluun. Erdenetülkhüür placed 63rd in the men's 15 kilometre classical cross-country race; he was the only one of the four to compete in an event final.

== Background ==
The Mongolian National Olympic Committee was recognized by the International Olympic Committee on 1 January 1962, and the nation entered Olympic competition soon after, talking part in both the 1964 Winter and Summer Olympics. Mongolia has only missed two Olympic Games since, the 1976 Winter Olympics; and the 1984 Summer Olympics as the Mongolians joined in the Soviet-led boycott of the Games in Los Angeles. Salt Lake City was Mongolia's tenth appearance at a Winter Olympics. The 2002 Winter Olympics were held from 8–24 February 2002; a total of 2,399 athletes took part representing 77 National Olympic Committees. The Mongolian delegation consisted of four athletes, two cross-country skiers; Davaagiin Enkhee and Jargalyn Erdenetülkhüür, as well as two short-track speed skating competitors; Battulgyn Oktyabri and Ganbatyn Jargalanchuluun. Erdenetülkhüür was selected as the flag bearer for the opening ceremony.

== Cross-country skiing ==
Jargalyn was 23 years old at the time of these Olympics, and he was making his Olympic debut. On 12 February, he took part in the 15 kilometre classical race, finishing in a time of 45 minutes and 54.7 seconds, which put him in 63rd place out of 66 classified finishers; the gold medal being won by Andrus Veerpalu of Estonia in a time of 37 minutes and 7.4 seconds, the silver medal was earned by Frode Estil of Norway, and the bronze was taken by Jaak Mae, also of Estonia. Davaagiin Enkhee was 37 years old at the time of the Salt Lake City Olympics, and had previously represented Mongolia at the 1988 Winter Olympics. The women's 2 × 5 kilometre pursuit, held on 15 February, consisted of two stages. First was 5 kilometres of classical style racing, then there was another 5 kilometre freestyle pursuit section. Only the top 50 from the classical stage qualified to participate in the freestyle portion. Enkhee finished the classical portion in 17 minutes and 20.3 seconds, which put her in 68th place, and she was eliminated. The gold medal was eventually won by Canadian Beckie Scott, the silver by Czech competitor Kateřina Neumannová, and the bronze was earned by Viola Bauer of Germany.

=== Men ===
Event	Athlete	Race	
Event	Athlete	Time	Rank
15 km classical	Jargalyn Erdenetülkhüür	45:54.7	63

=== Women's pursuit ===
Athlete	5 km C		5 km F pursuit	
Athlete	Time	Rank	Time	Final rank
Davaagiin Enkhee	17:20.3	68	did not advance	

C = Classical style, F = Freestyle

== Short track speed skating ==
Ganbatyn Jargalanchuluun was 15 years old at the time of the Salt Lake City Olympics, and was making his Olympic debut. In the first round of the men's 500 metres competition, he finished with a time of 52.225 seconds, which was fourth in his heat; only the top two in each heat were allowed to advance, and he was eliminated, the slower time that advanced from his heat was 42.849 seconds. The gold meal was won by Canadian Marc Gagnon, the silver by his fellow Canadian Jonathan Guilmette, and the bronze was won by American Rusty Smith. Battulgyn Oktyabri was 21 years old at the time, and had previously represented Mongolia at the 1998 Winter Olympics. In the men's 1000 metres first round, held on 13 February, he finished fourth in his heat with a time of 1 minute and 47.213 seconds, but like the 500 metres race, only the top two from each heat could advance, the slower qualifying time in his heat was 1 minute and 33.167 seconds. The gold medal was eventually won by Steven Bradbury of Australia, the silver by American Apolo Ohno, and the bronze was earned by Canada's Mathieu Turcotte.

Athlete	Event	Round one		Quarter finals		Semi finals		Finals		
Athlete	Event	Time	Rank	Time	Rank	Time	Rank	Time	Final rank	
Ganbatyn Jargalanchuluun	500 m	52.225	4	did not advance						29th
Battulgyn Oktyabri	1000 m	1:47.213	4	did not advance						28th
