= Mongolia at the 1984 Winter Olympics =

- IOC code: MGL
- NOC: Mongolian National Olympic Committee
- Website: www.olympic.mn (in Mongolian)

in Sarajevo
- Competitors: 4 (men) in 1 sport
- Flag bearer: Luvsandashiin Dorj
- Medals: Gold 0 Silver 0 Bronze 0 Total 0

Winter Olympics appearances (overview)
- 1964; 1968; 1972; 1976; 1980; 1984; 1988; 1992; 1994; 1998; 2002; 2006; 2010; 2014; 2018; 2022; 2026

Mongolia competed at the 1984 Winter Olympics in Sarajevo, Yugoslavia.

== Cross-country skiing ==
Men

Event	Athlete	Race	
Event	Athlete	Time	Rank
15 km	Pürevjavyn Batsükh	DSQ doping	–
15 km	Vangansürengiin Renchinkhorol	DSQ	–
15 km	Dondogiin Gankhuyag	DSQ	–
15 km	Luvsandashiin Dorj	49:17.8	65
30 km	Pürevjavyn Batsükh	DSQ doping	–
30 km	Dondogiin Gankhuyag	1'47:32.5	63
30 km	Vangansürengiin Renchinkhorol	1'47:04.0	61
30 km	Luvsandashiin Dorj	1'43:03.1	55

Men's 4 × 10 km relay

Athletes	Race	
Athletes	Time	Rank
Pürevjavyn Batsükh; Vangansürengiin Renchinkhorol; Dondogiin Gankhuyag; Luvsandashiin Dorj	DSQ doping	–
