= Cross-country skiing at the 1964 Winter Olympics – Men's 15 kilometre =

Men's 15km at the IX Olympic Winter Games
- Cross-country skiing
- Venue: Cross Country Skiing Stadium
- Date: 2 February 1964
- Competitors: 71 from 21 nations
- Winning time: 50:54.1

Medalists
1st place, gold medalist(s)		Eero Mäntyranta	Finland
2nd place, silver medalist(s)		Harald Grønningen	Norway
3rd place, bronze medalist(s)		Sixten Jernberg	Sweden

The Men's 15 kilometre cross-country skiing event was part of the cross-country skiing programme at the 1964 Winter Olympics, in Innsbruck, Austria. The competition was held on 2 February 1964, at the Cross Country Skiing Stadium.

== Results ==
Rank	Name	Country	Time
1	Eero Mäntyranta	Finland	50:54.1
2	Harald Grønningen	Norway	51:34.8
3	Sixten Jernberg	Sweden	51:42.2
4	Väinö Huhtala	Finland	51:45.4
5	Janne Stefansson	Sweden	51:46.4
6	Pavel Kolchin	Soviet Union	51:52.0
7	Igor Voronchikhin	Soviet Union	51:53.9
8	Magnar Lundemo	Norway	51:55.2
9	Kalevi Laurila	Finland	51:59.8
10	Franco Nones	Italy	52:18.0
11	Eino Huhtala	Finland	52:18.2
12	Giuseppe Steiner	Italy	52:28.0
13	Assar Rönnlund	Sweden	52:35.5
14	Gennady Vaganov	Soviet Union	52:46.8
15	Einar Østby	Norway	52:52.2
16	Lars Olsson	Sweden	52:57.9
17	Valery Tarakanov	Soviet Union	52:58.2
18	Giulio Deflorian	Italy	53:31.7
19	Félix Mathieu	France	54:02.2
20	Victor Arbez	France	54:04.0
21	Józef Rysula	Poland	54:09.4
22	Walter Demel	United Team of Germany	54:37.0
23	Roger Pires	France	54:38.5
24	Enno Röder	United Team of Germany	54:52.8
25	Ole Ellefsæter	Norway	55:10.8
26	Tatsuo Kitamura	Japan	55:24.3
27	Marcello De Dorigo	Italy	55:26.1
28	Edward Budny	Poland	55:35.2
29	Ladislav Hrubý	Czechoslovakia	55:44.9
30	Hans Ammann	Switzerland	55:44.9
31	Hans-Sigfrid Oberer	Switzerland	55:47.9
32	Franz Kälin	Switzerland	55:50.3
33	Tadeusz Jankowski	Poland	55:57.2
34	Donald MacLeod	Canada	55:58.5
35	Kazuo Sato	Japan	56:04.5
36	Helmut Weidlich	United Team of Germany	56:04.6
37	Claude Legrand	France	56:05.8
38	Mike Gallagher	United States	56:19.4
39	Gheorghe Bădescu	Romania	56:29.6
40	Konrad Hischier	Switzerland	56:42.3
41	Mike Elliott	United States	56:51.8
42	Hidezo Takahashi	Japan	57:03.4
43	Stefan Mitkov	Bulgaria	57:05.0
44	Karl Buhl	United Team of Germany	57:10.2
45	Józef Gut Misiaga	Poland	57:27.1
46	Roman Seljak	Yugoslavia	57:30.0
47	Karl Bohlin	United States	57:54.0
48	Hermann Lackner	Austria	58:04.0
49	Dick Taylor	United States	58:19.6
50	Cveto Pavčič	Yugoslavia	58:21.0
51	Franz Portmann	Canada	58:47.0
52	Hubert Schrott	Austria	59:01.7
53	Anton Kogler	Austria	59:10.6
54	Luvsan-Ayuushiin Dashdemberel	Mongolia	1-00:08.1
55	Þórhallur Sveinsson	Iceland	1-00:14.9
56	John Moore	Great Britain	1-00:16.6
57	Svend Carlsen	Denmark	1-00:20.7
58	Chogoro Yahata	Japan	1-00:46.1
59	Günther Rieger	Austria	1-01:07.3
60	Janko Kobentar	Yugoslavia	1-01:14.6
61	Eric Luoma	Canada	1-01:39.8
62	Andrew Morgan	Great Britain	1-02:20.9
63	Banzragchiin Zundui	Mongolia	1-02:21.5
64	Sodnomtserengiin Natsagdorj	Mongolia	1-02:23.4
65	Martti Rautio	Canada	1-02:52.4
66	David Rees	Great Britain	1-03:06.8
67	Birgir Guðlaugsson	Iceland	1-04:53.9
68	Dambadarjaagiin Baadai	Mongolia	1-05:23.6
69	Frederick Andrew	Great Britain	1-06:51.4
AC	Mirko Bavče	Yugoslavia	DNF
AC	Borislav Ochushki	Bulgaria	DNF
