= Mongolia at the 1998 Winter Olympics =

- IOC code: MGL
- NOC: Mongolian National Olympic Committee
- Website: www.olympic.mn (in Mongolian)

in Nagano
- Competitors: 3 (men) in 2 sports
- Flag bearer: Boldyn Sansarbileg (short track speed skating)
- Medals: Gold 0 Silver 0 Bronze 0 Total 0

Winter Olympics appearances (overview)
- 1964; 1968; 1972; 1976; 1980; 1984; 1988; 1992; 1994; 1998; 2002; 2006; 2010; 2014; 2018; 2022; 2026

Mongolia competed at the 1998 Winter Olympics in Nagano, Japan from February 7 to 22. Mongolia's team consisted of 1 cross-country skier, who was Dashzevegiin Ochirsükh, and two short track speed skaters, who were Battulgyn Oktyabri and Boldyn Sansarbileg.

== Competitors ==
The following is the list of number of competitors in the Games.

Sport	Men	Women	Total
Cross-country skiing	1	0	1
Short track speed skating	2	0	2
Total	3	0	3

== Cross-country skiing ==
Men

Event	Athlete	Race	
Event	Athlete	Time	Rank
10 km C	Dashzevegiin Ochirsükh	39:38.6	90

C = Classical style, F = Freestyle

== Short track speed skating ==
Men

Athlete	Event	Round one		Quarter finals		Semi finals		Finals		
Athlete	Event	Time	Rank	Time	Rank	Time	Rank	Time	Final rank	
Battulgyn Oktyabri	500 m	50.466	4	did not advance						28th
Boldyn Sansarbileg	1000 m	1:39.313	4	did not advance						29th
