= Mongolia at the 1972 Winter Olympics =

- IOC code: MGL
- NOC: Mongolian National Olympic Committee
- Website: www.olympic.mn (in Mongolian)

in Sapporo
- Competitors: 4 (men) in 2 sports
- Flag bearer: Luvsansharavyn Tsend
- Medals: Gold 0 Silver 0 Bronze 0 Total 0

Winter Olympics appearances (overview)
- 1964; 1968; 1972; 1976; 1980; 1984; 1988; 1992; 1994; 1998; 2002; 2006; 2010; 2014; 2018; 2022; 2026

Mongolia competed at the 1972 Winter Olympics in Sapporo, Japan.

== Cross-country skiing ==
Men

Event	Athlete	Race	
Event	Athlete	Time	Rank
15 km	Namsrain Sandagdorj	52:48.54	57
15 km	Danzangiin Narantungalag	52:06.18	56
30 km	Namsrain Sandagdorj	1'52:14.67	52
30 km	Danzangiin Narantungalag	1'51:29.88	51

== Speed skating ==
Men

Event	Athlete	Race	
Event	Athlete	Time	Rank
500 m	Luvsanlkhagvyn Dashnyam	42.86	28
1500 m	Luvsanlkhagvyn Dashnyam	2:20.42	38
5000 m	Luvsansharavyn Tsend	8:30.47	28
10,000 m	Luvsansharavyn Tsend	17:15.34	24
