= Mongolia at the 1992 Winter Olympics =

- IOC code: MGL
- NOC: Mongolian National Olympic Committee
- Website: www.olympic.mn (in Mongolian)

in Albertville
- Competitors: 4 (men) in 2 sports
- Flag bearer: Ziitsagaany Ganbat (cross-country skiing)
- Medals: Gold 0 Silver 0 Bronze 0 Total 0

Winter Olympics appearances (overview)
- 1964; 1968; 1972; 1976; 1980; 1984; 1988; 1992; 1994; 1998; 2002; 2006; 2010; 2014; 2018; 2022; 2026

Mongolia was represented at the 1992 Winter Olympics in Albertville, France by the Mongolian National Olympic Committee.

In total, four athletes – all men – represented Mongolia in two different sports including cross-country skiing and speed skating.

== Competitors ==
In total, four athletes represented Mongolia at the 1992 Winter Olympics in Albertville, France across two different sports.

Sport	Men	Women	Total
Cross-country skiing	2	0	2
Speed skating	2	0	2
Total	4	0	4

== Cross-country skiing ==
In total, two Mongolian athletes participated in the cross-country skiing events – Ziitsagaany Ganbat and Gongoryn Myeryei.

The men's 30 km classical took place on 10 February 1992. Myeryei completed the course in a time of one hour 42 minutes 33.1 seconds to finish 73rd overall. Ganbat completed the course in a time of one hour 44 minutes 45.6 seconds to finish 78th overall.

The men's 10 km classical took place on 13 February 1992. Myeryei completed the course in a time of 35 minutes 5.9 seconds to finish 82nd overall. Ganbat completed the course in a time of 35 minutes 10.3 seconds to finish 83rd overall.

The men's 15 km freestyle pursuit took place on 13 February 1992. Myeryei completed the course in a time of 53 minutes 11.9 seconds to finish 77th overall. Ganbat completed the course in a time of 55 minutes 48.4 seconds to finish 84th overall.

The men's 50 km freestyle took place on 22 February 1992. Myeryei completed the course in a time of two hours 32 minutes 27.2 seconds to finish 64th overall.

Men

Event	Athlete	Race	
Event	Athlete	Time	Rank
10 km C	Ziitsagaany Ganbat	35:10.3	83
10 km C	Gongoryn Myeryei	35:05.9	82
15 km pursuit^{1} F	Ziitsagaany Ganbat	54:48.4	84
15 km pursuit^{1} F	Gongoryn Myeryei	53:11.9	77
30 km C	Ziitsagaany Ganbat	1'44:45.6	78
30 km C	Gongoryn Myeryei	1'42:33.1	73
50 km F	Gongoryn Myeryei	2'32:27.2	64

^{1} Starting delay based on 10 km results.
C = Classical style, F = Freestyle

== Speed skating ==
In total, two Mongolian athletes participated in the speed skating events – Altangadasyn Sodnomdarjaa in the men's 1,000 m and the men's 1,500 m and Nyamdondovyn Ganbold in the men's 5,000 m and the men's 10,000.

The men's 5,000 m took place on 13 February 1992. Ganbold completed the course in a time of seven minutes 30.07 seconds to finish 31st overall.

The men's 1,500 m took place on 16 February 1992. Sodnomdarjaa completed the course in a time of two minutes 5.43 seconds to finish 43rd overall.

The men's 1,000 m took place on 18 February 1992. Sodnomdarjaa completed the course in a time of one minute 21.40 seconds to finish 42nd overall.

The men's 10,000 m took place on 20 February 1992. Ganbold completed the course in a time of 15 minutes 18.56 seconds to finish 29th overall.

Men

Event	Athlete	Race	
Event	Athlete	Time	Rank
1,000 m	Altangadasyn Sodnomdarjaa	1:21.40	42
1,500 m	Altangadasyn Sodnomdarjaa	2:05.43	43
5,000 m	Nyamdondovyn Ganbold	7:30.07	31
10,000 m	Nyamdondovyn Ganbold	15:18.56	29
