= Mongolia at the 1980 Winter Olympics =

- IOC code: MGL
- NOC: Mongolian National Olympic Committee
- Website: www.olympic.mn (in Mongolian)

in Lake Placid
- Competitors: 3 (men) in 2 sports
- Flag bearer: Luvsandashiin Dorj
- Medals: Gold 0 Silver 0 Bronze 0 Total 0

Winter Olympics appearances (overview)
- 1964; 1968; 1972; 1976; 1980; 1984; 1988; 1992; 1994; 1998; 2002; 2006; 2010; 2014; 2018; 2022; 2026

Mongolia competed at the 1980 Winter Olympics in Lake Placid, United States. The nation returned to the Winter Games after having missed the 1976 Winter Olympics.

== Cross-country skiing ==
Men

Event	Athlete	Race	
Event	Athlete	Time	Rank
15 km	Luvsandashiin Dorj	48:05.78	48
30 km	Luvsandashiin Dorj	1'53:52.24	52
50 km	Luvsandashiin Dorj	2'48:22.97	36

== Speed skating ==
Men

Event	Athlete	Race	
Event	Athlete	Time	Rank
500 m	Tömörbaataryn Nyamdavaa	42.41	35
500 m	Dorjiin Tsenddoo	41.68	34
1000 m	Dorjiin Tsenddoo	1:27.00	38
1000 m	Tömörbaataryn Nyamdavaa	1:24.84	37
1500 m	Dorjiin Tsenddoo	2:19.30	35
1500 m	Tömörbaataryn Nyamdavaa	2:11.51	31
5000 m	Tömörbaataryn Nyamdavaa	8:07.68	29
