= Mongolia at the 2006 Winter Olympics =

- IOC code: MGL
- NOC: Mongolian National Olympic Committee
- Website: www.olympic.mn (in Mongolian)

in Turin
- Competitors: 2 (1 man, 1 woman) in 1 sport
- Flag bearers: Khürelbaataryn Khash-Erdene (opening); Erdene-Ochiryn Ochirsüren (closing)
- Medals: Gold 0 Silver 0 Bronze 0 Total 0

Winter Olympics appearances (overview)
- 1964; 1968; 1972; 1976; 1980; 1984; 1988; 1992; 1994; 1998; 2002; 2006; 2010; 2014; 2018; 2022; 2026

Mongolia sent a delegation to compete at the 2006 Winter Olympics in Turin, Italy from 10–26 February 2006. The delegation consisted of two cross-country skiers, Erdene-Ochiryn Ochirsüren and Khürelbaataryn Khash-Erdene. Their best finish in any event was 68th in the women's 10 kilometer classical by Ochirsüren. The same two competitors would return to the Olympics four years later representing Mongolia at the 2010 Winter Olympics.

== Background ==
The Mongolian National Olympic Committee was recognized by the International Olympic Committee on 1 January 1962, and the nation entered Olympic competition soon after, talking part in both the 1964 Winter and Summer Olympics. Mongolia has only missed two Olympic Games since, the 1976 Winter Olympics; and the 1984 Summer Olympics as the Mongolians joined in the Soviet-led boycott of the Games in Los Angeles. The delegation Mongolia sent to Turin consisted of two cross-country skiers, Erdene-Ochiryn Ochirsüren and Khürelbaataryn Khash-Erdene. Khash-Erdene was the flag bearer for the opening ceremony while Ochirsüren was chosen to carry the flag for the closing ceremony.

== Cross-country skiing ==
Khürelbaataryn Khash-Erdene was 22 years old at the time of the Turin Olympics. In the men's 15 kilometre classical race, held on 17 February, he finished with a time of 48 minutes and 47 seconds, which put him in 84th place out of 96 competitors who finished the race; the gold medal was won by Andrus Veerpalu of Estonia in 38 minutes and 1 second. He would later go on to represent Mongolia at the 2010 Winter Olympics.

Erdene-Ochiryn Ochirsüren was 20 years of age at the time of these Games. She competed in the women's 10 kilometer classical, held on 16 February. She finished the race with a time of 36 minutes and 40.1 seconds, which saw her in 68th position out of 70 competitors who finished the race, the gold medal having been won by Kristina Šmigun-Vähi of Estonia. in 27 minutes and 51 seconds. Like her compatriot, she would also go on to participate in the 2010 Winter Olympics.

Athlete	Event	Final	
Athlete	Event	Total	Rank
Khürelbaataryn Khash-Erdene	Men's 15 km classical	48:47.2	85
Erdene-Ochiryn Ochirsüren	Women's 10 km classical	36:40.1	68

== See also ==
- Mongolia at the 2006 Winter Paralympics
