= Mongolia at the 1988 Winter Olympics =

- IOC code: MGL
- NOC: Mongolian National Olympic Committee
- Website: www.olympic.mn (in Mongolian)

in Calgary
- Competitors: 3 (2 men, 1 woman) in 1 sport
- Flag bearer: Davaagiin Enkhee
- Medals: Gold 0 Silver 0 Bronze 0 Total 0

Winter Olympics appearances (overview)
- 1964; 1968; 1972; 1976; 1980; 1984; 1988; 1992; 1994; 1998; 2002; 2006; 2010; 2014; 2018; 2022; 2026

Mongolia competed at the 1988 Winter Olympics in Calgary, Alberta, Canada.

== Competitors ==
The following is the list of number of competitors in the Games.

Sport	Men	Women	Total
Cross-country skiing	2	1	3
Total	2	1	3

== Cross-country skiing ==
Men

Event	Athlete	Race	
Event	Athlete	Time	Rank
15 km C	Dambajantsagiin Battulga	50:09.4	69
15 km C	Ziitsagaany Ganbat	48:48.9	62
30 km C	Ziitsagaany Ganbat	1'42:24.2	72
30 km C	Dambajantsagiin Battulga	1'40:41.3	69
50 km F	Dambajantsagiin Battulga	2'30:33.7	60
50 km F	Ziitsagaany Ganbat	2'26:22.0	57

C = Classical style, F = Freestyle

Women

Event	Athlete	Race	
Event	Athlete	Time	Rank
5 km C	Davaagiin Enkhee	18:02.2	50
10 km C	Davaagiin Enkhee	35:40.8	48
20 km F	Davaagiin Enkhee	1'08:14.5	51

C = Classical style, F = Freestyle
