= Tsend =

Tsend (Mongolian: Цэнд, genitive form: Tsendiin, Цэндийн) is a Mongolian name, signifying:

- Tsendiin Damdinsüren (1908–1986), Mongolian author
- Luvsansharavyn Tsend (born 1940), Mongolian Olympic speed-skater
- Tsendiin Nyamdorj (born 1956), chairman of the Mongolian parliament
- Tsendiin Damdin (1957–2018), olympic judo silver medalist of 1957
- Tsend-Ayuushiin Ochirbat (born 1974), Mongolian Olympic judoka
- Tsendiin Mönkh-Orgil, the foreign minister of Mongolia
