= Lekman =

Lekman is a surname. Notable people with the surname include:

- Björn Lekman (born 1944), Swedish speed skater
- Jens Lekman (born 1981), Swedish musician
- Sirkka Lekman (born 1944), Finnish teacher and politician
