= Klimpen =

Klimpen may refer to:

- Nickname for Swedish ice hockey goalkeeper Lennart Häggroth
- Fictional character in the Bert diaries, see Klimpen
