= Natsagdorj =

Natsagdorj (Mongolian: Нацагдорж) is a Mongolian given name of Tibetan origin. It may refer to:

- Dashdorjiin Natsagdorj (1906–1937), Mongolian writer, considered to be the founder and most-widely read author of modern Mongolian literature
- Shagdarjavin Natsagdorj (1918–2001), Mongolian academic and historian, director of the Institute of History at the Mongolian Academy of Sciences
- Tsedendambyn Natsagdorj (1944–2017), Mongolian Olympic wrestler
- Sodnomtserengiin Natsagdorj (1938–), Mongolian former cross-country skier
