= Mongolia at the 1994 Winter Olympics =

- IOC code: MGL
- NOC: Mongolian National Olympic Committee
- Website: www.olympic.mn (in Mongolian)

in Lillehammer
- Competitors: 1 in 1 sport
- Flag bearer: Batchuluuny Bat-Orgil
- Medals: Gold 0 Silver 0 Bronze 0 Total 0

Winter Olympics appearances (overview)
- 1964; 1968; 1972; 1976; 1980; 1984; 1988; 1992; 1994; 1998; 2002; 2006; 2010; 2014; 2018; 2022; 2026

Mongolia sent a delegation to compete at the 1994 Winter Olympics in Lillehammer, Norway from 12 to 27 February 1994. The Mongolian delegation consisted of a single short track speed skater Batchuluuny Bat-Orgil. He competed in two events, where he finished the 500 metres event in 24th place and the 1000 metres competition in 29th position.

== Background ==
The Mongolian National Olympic Committee was recognized by the International Olympic Committee on 1 January 1962, and the nation entered Olympic competition soon after, talking part in both the 1964 Winter and Summer Olympics. Mongolia has only missed two Olympic Games since, the 1976 Winter Olympics; and the 1984 Summer Olympics as the Mongolians joined in the Soviet-led boycott of the Games in Los Angeles. Lillehammer was Mongolia's seventh appearance at a Winter Olympics. The 1994 Winter Olympics were held from 12 to 27 February 1994; a total of 1,737 athletes representing 67 National Olympic Committees took part. Batchuluuny Bat-Orgil, a short-track speed skater, was the only competitor Mongolia sent to Lillehammer. He was selected as the flag-bearer for the opening ceremony.

== Competitors ==
The following is the list of number of competitors in the Games.

Sport	Men	Women	Total
Short track speed skating	1	0	1
Total	1	0	1

== Short track speed skating ==
Batchuluuny Bat-Orgil was 24 years old at the time of the Lillehammer Olympics, and was making his only Olympic appearance. He entered two events: the 500 metres and the 1000 metres. The 1000 metres race was held on 22 February, and he was drawn into heat one, which he finished in a time of 1 minute and 40.41 seconds, which was fourth and last in his heat. Only the top two from each heat were allowed to advance, and as a result Batchuluuny was eliminated. The gold medal was won by Kim Ki-hoon of South Korea, the silver was won by his fellow South Korean Chae Ji-hoon, and the bronze by Marc Gagnon of Canada.

The 500 metres race was held from 24 to 26 February, and Batchuluuny was drawn into heat four. He finished the heat in 48.63 seconds, third out of three finishers in his heat, but only the top two in each heat were allowed to advance, and he was eliminated. Based on his heat time, he was classified as 24th place out of 31 competitors. The gold medal was eventually won by Chae Ji-hoon of South Korea, the silver was taken by Mirko Vuillermin of Italy, and the bronze medal was won by Nicky Gooch of Great Britain.

Athlete	Event	Heats		Quarterfinals		Semifinals		Final	
Athlete	Event	Time	Rank	Time	Rank	Time	Rank	Time	Rank
Batchuluuny Bat-Orgil	500 metres	48.63	3rd	Ranking Round					24th
Batchuluuny Bat-Orgil	1000 metres	1:40.41	4th	Ranking Round					29th

== See also ==
- Mongolia at the 1994 Asian Games
