= Mongolia at the 2010 Winter Olympics =

- IOC code: MGL
- NOC: Mongolian National Olympic Committee
- Website: www.olympic.mn (in Mongolian)

in Vancouver
- Competitors: 2 in 1 sport
- Flag bearer: Erdene-Ochiryn Ochirsüren
- Medals: Gold 0 Silver 0 Bronze 0 Total 0

Winter Olympics appearances (overview)
- 1964; 1968; 1972; 1976; 1980; 1984; 1988; 1992; 1994; 1998; 2002; 2006; 2010; 2014; 2018; 2022; 2026

Mongolia participated in the 2010 Winter Olympics in Vancouver, British Columbia, Canada from 12–28 February 2010. The Mongolian delegation consisted of two cross-country skiers, Khürelbaataryn Khash-Erdene and Erdene-Ochiryn Ochirsüren. The delegation's best finish in any event was 73rd by Ochirsüren in the Women's 10 kilometre freestyle.

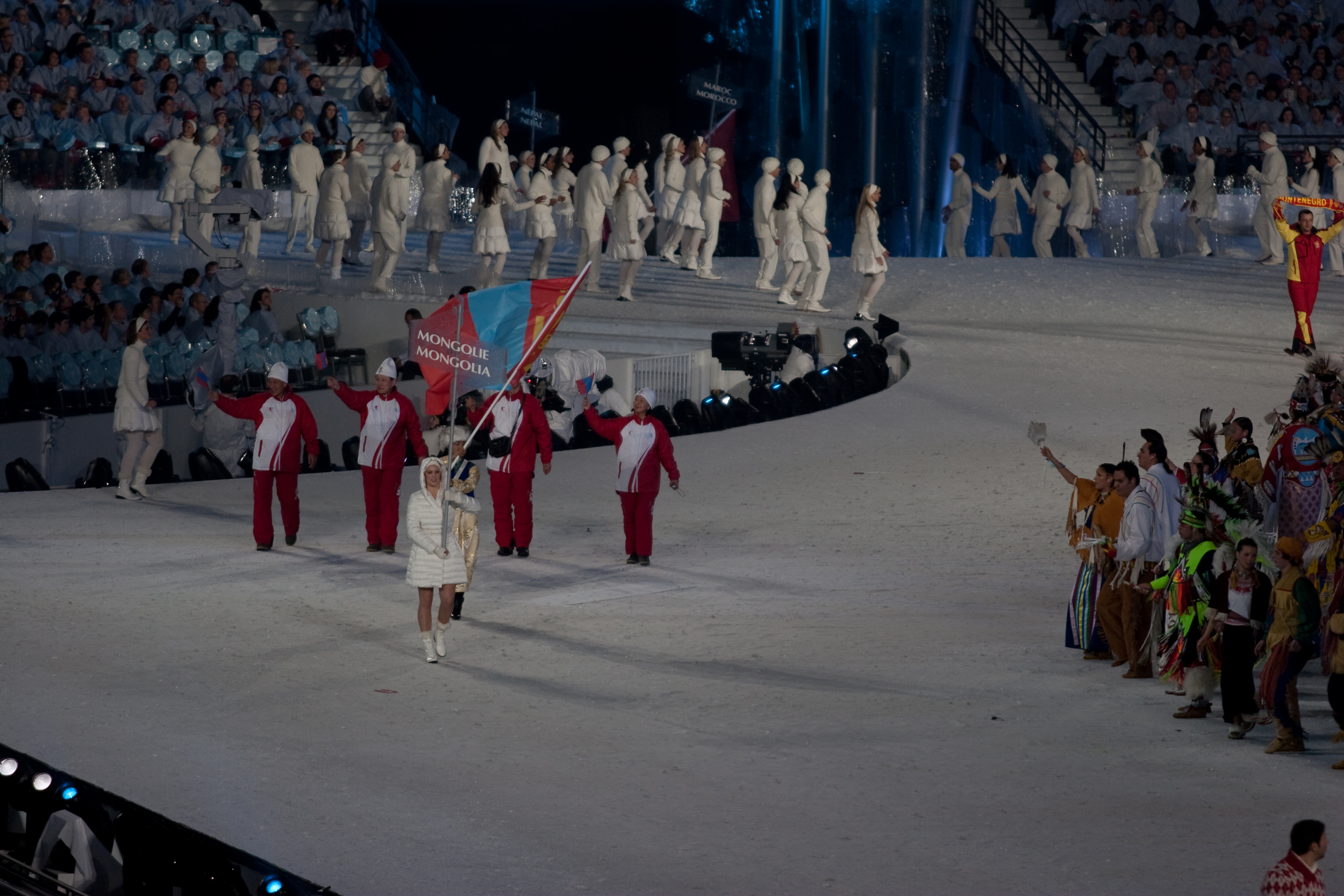
The athletes entering the stadium during the opening ceremonies.

== Background ==
The Mongolian National Olympic Committee was recognized by the International Olympic Committee on 1 January 1962, and the nation entered Olympic competition soon after, talking part in both the 1964 Winter and Summer Olympics. Mongolia has only missed two Olympic Games since, the 1976 Winter Olympics; and the 1984 Summer Olympics as the Mongolians joined in the Soviet-led boycott of the Games in Los Angeles. Vancouver marked the Mongolian's twelfth appearance at a Winter Olympic Games. The delegation sent to Vancouver consisted of two cross-country skiers; Khürelbaataryn Khash-Erdene and Erdene-Ochiryn Ochirsüren. Ochirsüren was chosen as the flag bearer for the opening ceremony, while Khash-Erdene was selected for the closing ceremony.

== Cross-country skiing ==
Khürelbaataryn Khash-Erdene was 26 years old at the time of the Vancouver Olympics, and had previously represented Mongolia at the 2006 Winter Olympics. His only race, the Men's 15 kilometre freestyle was held on 15 February. Khash-Erdene finished with a time of 42 minutes and 27 seconds, nearly nine minutes behind the gold-medal winning time. This put him in 87th position, out of 96 competitors who finished the race.

Erdene-Ochiryn Ochirsüren was 24 years old at the time of these Games, and also had prior Olympic experience at the 2006 Turin Olympics for the Mongolian team. Her race was the Women's 10 kilometre freestyle also held on 15 February, and she finished with a time of 32 minutes and 56 seconds. She was nearly eight minutes behind the gold medallist in completing the race. She placed 73rd, out of a field of 77 classified competitors.

Athlete	Event	Final		
Athlete	Event	Time	Deficit	Rank
Khürelbaataryn Khash-Erdene	Men's 15 km freestyle	42:27.4	8:51.1	87
Erdene-Ochiryn Ochirsüren	Women's 10 km freestyle	32:56.1	7:57.7	74

== See also ==
- Mongolia at the Olympics
- Mongolia at the 2010 Winter Paralympics
