= Krisztián Szabó =

Krisztián Szabó may refer to:

- Krisztián Szabó (speed skater)
- Krisztián Szabó (chess player)
- Krisztián Szabó (racing driver)
