= Boldyn Byambadorj =

Mongolian cross-country skier (born 1991)

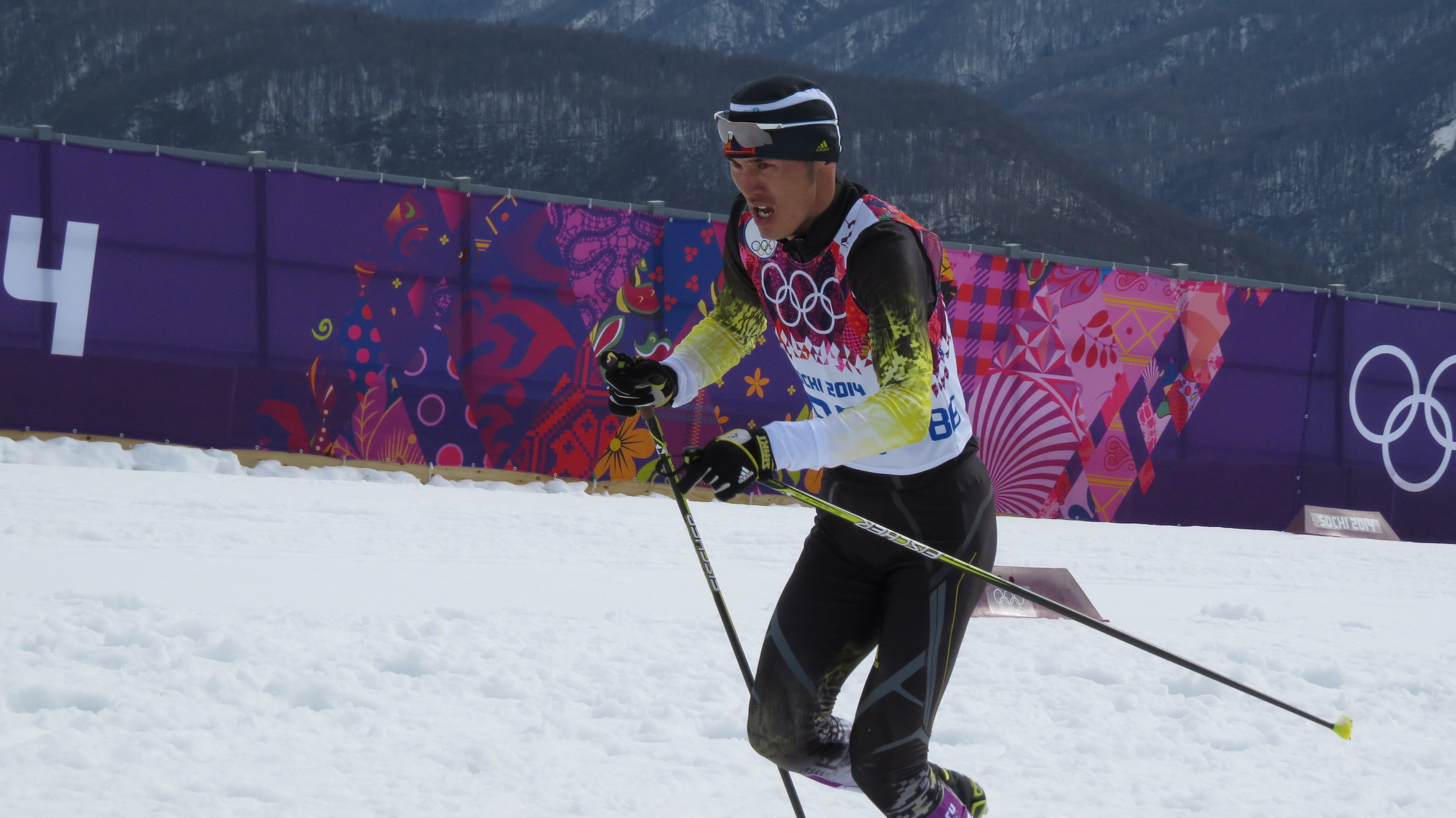

Personal information
- Born: April 6, 1991 (age 35) Bulgan Province, Mongolia

Sport
- Country: Mongolia
- Sport: Cross-country skiing

Boldyn Byambadorj (born April 6, 1991 in Bulgan Province, Mongolia) is a cross-country skier from Mongolia. He will compete for Mongolia at the 2014 Winter Olympics in the 15 kilometre classical race.

Byambadorj was also selected to carry the Mongolian flag during the opening ceremony.

== See also ==
- Mongolia at the 2014 Winter Olympics

Olympic Games
Preceded by Erdene-Ochir Ochirsuren	Flagbearer for Mongolia; Sochi 2014	Succeeded by Incumbent -->
