= Danzan =

Danzan may refer to:

- Danzan-ryū, a jiujitsu school

Danzan (Mongolian: Данзан) is a Mongolian personal name. Notable persons with this name include:

as proper name

- Soliin Danzan (1885–1924), Mongolian revolutionary and political leader,
- Ajvaagiin Danzan (1895–1932), Mongolian revolutionary and political leader.

as patronymic

- Danzangiin Narantungalag, a Mongolian olympic cross-country ski athlete
- Danzangiin Lundeejantsan, a Mongolian MP and former chairman of the parliament
