= Ganbatyn =

Ganbatyn (Mongolian: Ганбатын) is a Mongolian patronymic. Notable people with this patronymic include:

- Ganbatyn Boldbaatar (born 1987), Mongolian judoka
- Ganbatyn Bolor-Erdene (born 1995), Mongolian parataekwondo practitioner
- Ganbatyn Erdenebold (born 1993), Mongolian artistic gymnast
- Ganbatyn Jargalanchuluun (born 1986), Mongolian short track speed skater
- Ganbatyn Munkhbayar (Beck), Mongolian singer-songwriter and television presenter
