= Mongolia at the 2022 Winter Olympics =

- Flag of Mongolia
- IOC code: MGL
- NOC: Mongolian National Olympic Committee
- Website: www.olympic.mn (in Mongolian)

in Beijing, China February 4–20, 2022
- Competitors: 2 (1 man and 1 woman) in 1 sport
- Flag bearers (opening): Batmönkhiin Achbadrakh; Enkhtuul Ariunsanaa
- Flag bearer (closing): Batmönkhiin Achbadrakh
- Medals: Gold 0 Silver 0 Bronze 0 Total 0

Winter Olympics appearances (overview)
- 1964; 1968; 1972; 1976; 1980; 1984; 1988; 1992; 1994; 1998; 2002; 2006; 2010; 2014; 2018; 2022; 2026

Mongolia competed at the 2022 Winter Olympics in Beijing, China, from 4 to 20 February 2022. Mongolia's team consisted of two cross-country skiers. This marked the fifth straight Winter Olympics the nation had sent two cross-country skiers, who were Batmönkhiin Achbadrakh and Enkhtuul Ariunsanaa. The delegation's best finish in any event was 65th of 90 competitors by Achbadrakh in the Men's 15 km classical.

== Competitors ==
The following is the list of number of competitors participating at the Games per sport/discipline.

Sport	Men	Women	Total
Cross-country skiing	1	1	2
Total	1	1	2

== Background ==
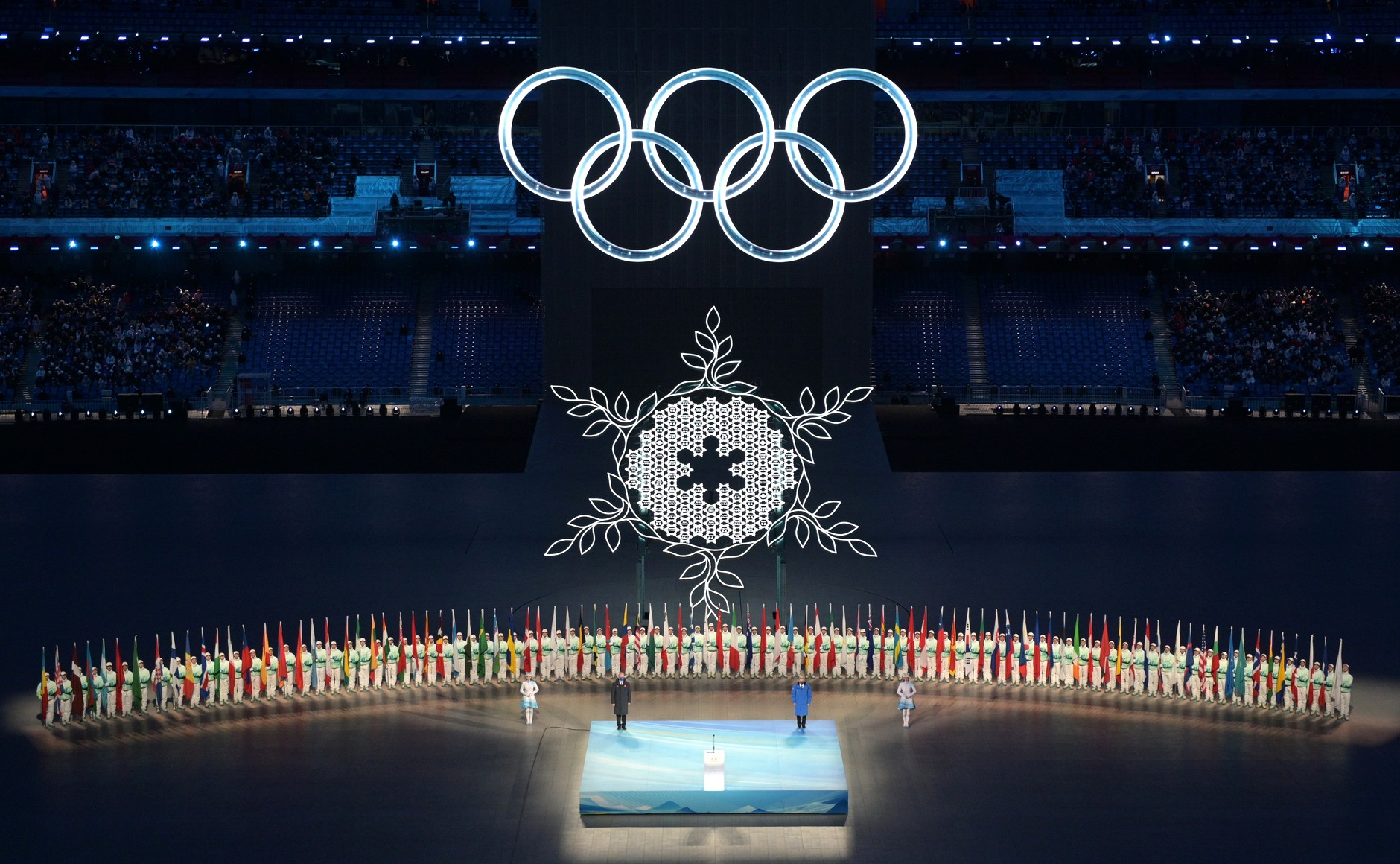
Opening ceremony for the 2022 Beijing Winter Olympics.

The Mongolian National Olympic Committee was recognized by the International Olympic Committee on 1 January 1962, and the nation entered Olympic competition soon after, taking part in both the 1964 Winter and Summer Olympics. Mongolia has only missed two Olympic Games since, the 1976 Winter Olympics; and the 1984 Summer Olympics as the Mongolians joined in the Soviet-led boycott of the Games in Los Angeles. Beijing marked the Mongolian's sixteenth appearance at a Winter Olympic Games. The delegation sent to Beijing consisted of two cross-country skiers; Batmönkhiin Achbadrakh and Enkhtuul Ariusanaa. Batmönkhiin Achbadrakh and Enkhtuul Ariunsanaa were the country's flag bearer during the opening ceremony. Meanwhile Achbadrakh was also the flagbearer during the closing ceremony. Achbadrakh and Ariunsanaa were chosen as the flag bearer's during the opening ceremony, while Achbadrakh was chosen for the closing ceremony as well.

== Cross-country skiing ==
Achbadrakh was 27 years old at the time of these Olympics, and had previously represented Mongolia at the 2018 Winter Olympics. On 11 February, he took part in the Men's 15 km freestyle, finishing with a time of 43 minutes and 29.9 seconds, which put him in 65th place of 99 competitors; the gold won by Iivo Niskanen of Finland in a time of 37 minutes and 54.8 seconds.

Ariunsanaa was 26 years old at the time of this Olympics and was making her Olympic debut. On 10 February, she took part in the Women's 10km classical, finishing in a time of 37 minutes and 2.5 seconds, which put her in 85th place of 98 competitors, the gold won by Therese Johaug of Norway with a time of 28 minutes and 6.3 seconds.

Athlete	Event	Final		
Athlete	Event	Time	Deficit	Rank
Batmönkhiin Achbadrakh	Men's 15 km classical	43:29.9	+5:35.1	65
Ariunsanaagiin Enkhtuul	Women's 10 km classical	37:02.5	+8:56.2	85

Sprint

Athlete	Event	Qualification		Quarterfinal		Semifinal		Final	
Athlete	Event	Time	Rank	Time	Rank	Time	Rank	Time	Rank
Batmönkhiin Achbadrakh	Men's	3:11.60	77	Did not advance					
Ariunsanaagiin Enkhtuul	Women's	3:58.25	79	Did not advance					
