= Mongolia at the 2026 Winter Olympics =

- Flag of Mongolia
- IOC code: MGL
- NOC: Mongolian National Olympic Committee
- Website: www.olympic.mn (in Mongolian)

in Milan and Cortina d'Ampezzo, Italy 6 February 2026 – 22 February 2026
- Competitors: 3 (2 men and 1 woman) in 2 sports
- Flag bearers (opening): Altanzulyn Ariunbat & Enkhbayaryn Ariuntungalag
- Flag bearers (closing): Batmönkhiin Achbadrakh & Enkhbayaryn Ariuntungalag
- Medals: Gold 0 Silver 0 Bronze 0 Total 0

Winter Olympics appearances (overview)
- 1964; 1968; 1972; 1976; 1980; 1984; 1988; 1992; 1994; 1998; 2002; 2006; 2010; 2014; 2018; 2022; 2026

Mongolia competed at the 2026 Winter Olympics in Milan and Cortina d'Ampezzo, Italy, from 6 to 22 February 2026.

Alpine skier Altanzulyn Ariunbat and cross-country skier Enkhbayaryn Ariuntungalag were the country's flagbearer during the opening ceremony. Meanwhile, Batmönkhiin Achbadrakh and Enkhbayaryn Ariuntungalag were the country's flagbearer during the closing ceremony.

== Competitors ==
The following is the list of number of competitors participating at the Games per sport/discipline.

Sport	Men	Women	Total
Alpine skiing	1	0	1
Cross-country skiing	1	1	2
Total	2	1	3

== Alpine skiing ==
Mongolia qualified one male alpine skier through the basic quota. This marked the nation’s first appearance in the sport at the Winter Olympics.

Athlete	Event	Run 1		Run 2		Total	
Athlete	Event	Time	Rank	Time	Rank	Time	Rank
Altanzulyn Ariunbat	Men's slalom	1:16.86	43	1:13.16	37	2:30.02	38

== Cross-country skiing ==
Mongolia qualified one female and one male cross-country skier through the basic quota.

Distance

Athlete	Event	Final		
Athlete	Event	Time	Deficit	Rank
Batmönkhiin Achbadrakh	Men's 20 km skiathlon	53:06.2	+6:55.2	55
Batmönkhiin Achbadrakh	Men's 10 km freestyle	25:32.8	+4:56.6	85
Enkhbayaryn Ariuntungalag	Women's 10 km freestyle	28:38.2	+5:49.0	83

Sprint

Athlete	Event	Qualification		Quarterfinal		Semifinal		Final	
Athlete	Event	Time	Rank	Time	Rank	Time	Rank	Time	Rank
Batmönkhiin Achbadrakh	Men's sprint	3:40.75	81	Did not advance					
Enkhbayaryn Ariuntungalag	Women's sprint	4:15.19	68	Did not advance					

== See also ==
- Mongolia at the 2026 Winter Paralympics
