= Battushig Batbold =

Mongolian businessman and member of the IOC

- Born: 23 July 1986 (age 40)
- Education: Bachelor of Arts, economics, University of Chicago; Master in Business Administration, Harvard Business School
- Occupation: Businessman; IOC Member
- Title: Chairman, Altai Holdings; Chairman, Skytel Group; Chairman, Sky Hypermarket LLC (Emart Mongolia)
- Parent: Sükhbaataryn Batbold (father)
- Awards: Forbes Mongolia Top 30 Young People (2017); Leading Entrepreneur (2019)

Battushig Batbold (born 23 July 1986) is a Mongolian businessman who has served as a member of the International Olympic Committee (IOC) since 2020.

== Education ==
Batbold received a bachelor of Arts degree in economics from the University of Chicago, and a Master in Business Administration from the Harvard Business School.

== Career ==
Batbold is chairman of his father Sükhbaataryn Batbold's company, Altai Holdings in Mongolia. He is also chair of one of Mongolia's leading telecommunications operators, Skytel Group, as well as Sky Hypermarket LLC (Emart Mongolia). As Skytel Group chairman, he has initiated projects for the SkyGO OTT platform. In 2019, he was executive producer of the series 37th tochka the most watched television show in Mongolia.

From 2016 until 2018, Batbold was a member of the Monetary Policy Committee of the Central Bank of Mongolia. He was also the former metals and mining analyst at Morgan Stanley Investment Bank in London.

== Sports career ==
Batbold played basketball throughout high school, where he was captain at the Northwest School in Seattle.

In 2015, Batbold was elected President of the Mongolian Badminton Association, which was followed by his election as a council member of the Badminton World Federation in 2017. That same year he was elected the First Vice President of the Mongolian National Olympic Committee (MNOC). From 2017 until 2019, he was an executive Committee member of Badminton Asia. In October 2018, Batbold who was an executive board member at the time was elected to become acting president of the MNOC when President Zagdsuren stepped down for health reasons. Batbold held the position until August 2020, when Naidangiin Tüvshinbayar was elected president at the MNOC's Extraordinary General Assembly. Batbold was the Chef de Mission for Mongolia during the Tokyo 2020 Olympics.

He has been a member of the IOC Marketing Commission since 2018, and a member of the IOC since 2020.

In March 2022 at the Mongolian National Olympic Committee Congress Battushig was elected with 93 percent of the votes to be the President of the Mongolian National Olympic Committee. He has been serving as President of MNOC since then.

Battushig Batbold was elected as an executive board member of the Olympic Council of Asia in September 2024, where he also serves as the Chair of the Culture Committee. Additionally, he is a member of the Coordination Committee for Aichi Nagoya 2026.

== Awards ==
In 2017, Batbold was listed in Forbes Mongolia as Top 30 Young People, and in 2019, he was listed as Leading Entrepreneur.
