= Mongolia at the Olympics =

- IOC code: MGL
- NOC: Mongolian National Olympic Committee
- Website: www.olympic.mn (in Mongolian)
- Medals Ranked 89th: Gold 2 Silver 12 Bronze 17 Total 31

Summer appearances
- 1964; 1968; 1972; 1976; 1980; 1984; 1988; 1992; 1996; 2000; 2004; 2008; 2012; 2016; 2020; 2024; 2028

Winter appearances
- 1964; 1968; 1972; 1976; 1980; 1984; 1988; 1992; 1994; 1998; 2002; 2006; 2010; 2014; 2018; 2022; 2026

Mongolia first participated at the Olympic Games in 1964, and has sent athletes to compete in all but one Summer Olympic Games since then, being part of the boycott of the 1984 Summer Olympics led by the Soviet Union. Mongolia has also participated in the Winter Olympic Games since 1964, missing only the 1976 Winter Games.

Mongolian athletes have won a total of 31 medals, all in Summer Olympics competitions, in freestyle wrestling, boxing, shooting, and judo. Prior to the 2008 Summer Olympics, Mongolia had won more silver and bronze medals without winning any gold medals than any other nation. Mongolia won their first ever gold medal in Judo, with Naidangiin Tüvshinbayar winning in the Men's half heavyweight. The first successful Оlympic athlete from Mongolia was the wrestler Jigjidiin Mönkhbat, who won the silver medal at the 1968 Summer Olympics with 4 wins, 2 draws, and 0 losses.

The Mongolian National Olympic Committee was created in 1956 and recognized by the International Olympic Committee in 1962.

== History ==
Mongolia first participated in competition at both winter and Summer Olympics in 1964. The next four years saw Mongolia win their first medals at the Mexico City Olympics in 1968, and the success of Mongolian freestyle wrestlers has helped strengthen the country's international standing. Chimedbazaryn Damdinsharav became first Mongolian Olympic medalist. As a result of the U.S.-led boycott in 1980, Mongolia joined the boycott led by the Soviet Union at the 1984 Los Angeles Olympics. The nation won its first two gold medals at the 2008 Summer Olympics in Beijing in judo and boxing.

== Medal tables ==
=== Medals by Summer Games ===
Games	Athletes	Gold	Silver	Bronze	Total	Rank
1964 Tokyo	21	0	0	0	0	–
1968 Mexico City	16	0	1	3	4	34
1972 Munich	39	0	1	0	1	33
1976 Montreal	33	0	1	0	1	34
1980 Moscow	43	0	2	2	4	27
1984 Los Angeles	boycotted					
1988 Seoul	13	0	0	1	1	46
1992 Barcelona	33	0	0	2	2	52
1996 Atlanta	16	0	0	1	1	71
2000 Sydney	20	0	0	0	0	–
2004 Athens	20	0	0	1	1	71
2008 Beijing	29	2	2	0	4	33
2012 London	29	0	2	3	5	58
2016 Rio de Janeiro	43	0	1	1	2	67
2020 Tokyo	43	0	1	3	4	71
2024 Paris	32	0	1	0	1	74
2028 Los Angeles	future event					
2032 Brisbane	future event					
Total		2	12	17	31	89

=== Medals by Winter Games ===
Games	Athletes	Gold	Silver	Bronze	Total	Rank
1964 Innsbruck	13	0	0	0	0	–
1968 Grenoble	7	0	0	0	0	–
1972 Sapporo	4	0	0	0	0	–
1976 Innsbruck	did not participate					
1980 Lake Placid	3	0	0	0	0	–
1984 Sarajevo	4	0	0	0	0	–
1988 Calgary	3	0	0	0	0	–
1992 Albertville	4	0	0	0	0	–
1994 Lillehammer	1	0	0	0	0	–
1998 Nagano	3	0	0	0	0	–
2002 Salt Lake City	4	0	0	0	0	–
2006 Turin	2	0	0	0	0	–
2010 Vancouver	2	0	0	0	0	–
2014 Sochi	2	0	0	0	0	–
2018 Pyeongchang	2	0	0	0	0	–
2022 Beijing	2	0	0	0	0	–
2026 Milano Cortina	3	0	0	0	0	–
2030 French Alps	future event					
2034 Utah	future event					
Total		0	0	0	0	–

=== Medals by summer sport ===
Sport	Gold	Silver	Bronze	Total
Judo	1	5	6	12
Boxing	1	2	4	7
Wrestling	0	4	6	10
Shooting	0	1	1	2
Totals (4 entries)	2	12	17	31

== List of medalists ==
Medal	Name	Games	Sport	Event
Silver	Jigjidiin Mönkhbat	1968 Mexico City	Wrestling	Men's freestyle 87 kg
Bronze	Chimedbazaryn Damdinsharav	1968 Mexico City	Wrestling	Men's freestyle 52 kg
Bronze	Danzandarjaagiin Sereeter	1968 Mexico City	Wrestling	Men's freestyle 70 kg
Bronze	Tömöriin Artag	1968 Mexico City	Wrestling	Men's freestyle 78 kg
Silver	Khorloogiin Bayanmönkh	1972 Munich	Wrestling	Men's freestyle 100 kg
Silver	Zevegiin Oidov	1976 Montreal	Wrestling	Men's freestyle 62 kg
Silver	Tsendiin Damdin	1980 Moscow	Judo	Men's 65 kg
Silver	Jamtsyn Davaajav	1980 Moscow	Wrestling	Men's freestyle 74 kg
Bronze	Ravdangiin Davaadalai	1980 Moscow	Judo	Men's 71 kg
Bronze	Dugarsürengiin Oyuunbold	1980 Moscow	Wrestling	Men's freestyle 57 kg
Bronze	Nergüin Enkhbat	1988 Seoul	Boxing	Men's lightweight
Bronze	Namjilyn Bayarsaikhan	1992 Barcelona	Boxing	Men's lightweight
Bronze	Dorjsürengiin Mönkhbayar	1992 Barcelona	Shooting	Women's 25 metre pistol
Bronze	Dorjpalamyn Narmandakh	1996 Atlanta	Judo	Men's 60 kg
Bronze	Khashbaataryn Tsagaanbaatar	2004 Athens	Judo	Men's 60 kg
Gold	Naidangiin Tüvshinbayar	2008 Beijing	Judo	Men's 100 kg
Gold	Enkhbatyn Badar-Uugan	2008 Beijing	Boxing	Men's bantamweight
Silver	Otryadyn Gündegmaa	2008 Beijing	Shooting	Women's 25 m metre pistol
Silver	Pürevdorjiin Serdamba	2008 Beijing	Boxing	Men's light flyweight
Silver	Nyambayaryn Tögstsogt	2012 London	Boxing	Men's 52kg
Silver	Naidangiin Tüvshinbayar	2012 London	Judo	Men's 100 kg
Bronze	Sainjargalyn Nyam-Ochir	2012 London	Judo	Men's 73kg
Bronze	Soronzonboldyn Battsetseg	2012 London	Wrestling	Women's freestyle 63kg
Bronze	Uranchimegiin Mönkh-Erdene	2012 London	Boxing	Men's light welterweight
Silver	Dorjsürengiin Sumiya	2016 Rio de Janeiro	Judo	Women's 57 kg
Bronze	Dorjnyambuugiin Otgondalai	2016 Rio de Janeiro	Boxing	Men's lightweight
Silver	Saeid Mollaei	2020 Tokyo	Judo	Men's 81 kg
Bronze	Urantsetseg Munkhbat	2020 Tokyo	Judo	Women's 48 kg
Bronze	Tsend-Ochiryn Tsogtbaatar	2020 Tokyo	Judo	Men's 73 kg
Bronze	Bat-Ochiryn Bolortuyaa	2020 Tokyo	Wrestling	Women's 53kg
Silver	Bavuudorjiin Baasankhüü	2024 Paris	Judo	Women's 48 kg

== See also ==
- List of Mongolians
- List of flag bearers for Mongolia at the Olympics
- Mongolia at the Asian Games
- Mongolia at the Paralympics
- Mongolia at the Youth Olympics
