= Manfred Zojer =

Austrian speed skater

Personal information
- Nationality: Austrian
- Born: 1 June 1939 (age 85); Klagenfurt, Austria

Sport
- Sport: Speed skating

Manfred Zojer (born 1 June 1939) is an Austrian speed skater. He competed in the men's 500 metres event at the 1964 Winter Olympics.
