= Mongolia at the 2014 Winter Olympics =

- IOC code: MGL
- NOC: Mongolian National Olympic Committee
- Website: www.olympic.mn (in Mongolian)

in Sochi
- Competitors: 2 in 1 sport
- Flag bearer: Bold Byambadorj (opening) Otgontsetseg Chinbat (closing)
- Medals: Gold 0 Silver 0 Bronze 0 Total 0

Winter Olympics appearances (overview)
- 1964; 1968; 1972; 1976; 1980; 1984; 1988; 1992; 1994; 1998; 2002; 2006; 2010; 2014; 2018; 2022; 2026

Mongolia competed at the 2014 Winter Olympics in Sochi, Russia from 7 to 23 February 2014. Mongolia's team consisted of two cross-country skiers. This marked the third straight Winter Olympics the nation had sent two cross-country skiers. The Mongolian team was the first officially welcomed team at the Games.

== Background ==
The Mongolian National Olympic Committee was recognized by the International Olympic Committee on 1 January 1962, and the nation entered Olympic competition soon after, talking part in both the 1964 Winter and Summer Olympics. Mongolia has only missed two Olympic Games since, the 1976 Winter Olympics; and the 1984 Summer Olympics as the Mongolians joined in the Soviet-led boycott of the Games in Los Angeles. Sochi marked the Mongolian's thirteenth appearance at a Winter Olympic Games. The delegation sent to Sochi consisted of two cross-country skiers; Byambadorj and Otgontsetseg.

== Cross-country skiing ==
According to the final quota allocation released on January 20, 2014, Mongolia has two athletes in qualification position. Byambadorj finished his race in 80th out of 92 competitors, while Otgontsetseg finished in 70th out of 76 competitors.

Distance

Athlete	Event	Final		
Athlete	Event	Time	Deficit	Rank
Bold Byambadorj	Men's 15 km classical	48:29.6	+9:59.9	80
Otgontsetseg Chinbat	Women's 10 km classical	38:43.1	+10:25.3	70

== See also ==
- Mongolia at the 2014 Summer Youth Olympics
- Mongolia at the 2014 Winter Paralympics
