= Pekka Lattunen =

Finnish speed skater

Personal information
- Nationality: Finnish
- Born: 26 June 1938 (age 86); Kivennapa, Finland

Sport
- Sport: Speed skating

Pekka Lattunen (born 26 June 1938) is a Finnish speed skater. He competed in the men's 500 metres at the 1964 Winter Olympics.
