= Hans-Sigfrid Oberer =

Swiss cross-country skier

Personal information
- Nationality: Swiss
- Born: 12 December 1933; Wimmis, Switzerland
- Died: 24 December 2020 (aged 87)

Sport
- Sport: Cross-country skiing

Hans-Sigfrid Oberer (12 December 1933 – 24 December 2020) was a Swiss cross-country skier. He competed in the men's 15 kilometre event at the 1964 Winter Olympics.
