= Eino Huhtala =

Finnish cross-country skier

Personal information
- Nationality: Finnish
- Born: 18 November 1938 (age 87) Siikajoki, Finland

Sport
- Sport: Cross-country skiing

Eino Huhtala (born 18 November 1938) is a Finnish cross-country skier. He competed in the men's 15 kilometre event at the 1964 Winter Olympics.

== Cross-country skiing results ==
All results are sourced from the International Ski Federation (FIS).

=== Olympic Games ===
Year	Age	15 km	30 km	50 km	4 × 10 km relay
1964	25	11	—	—	—
