= Cross-country skiing at the 2022 Winter Olympics – Qualification =

The following is about the qualification rules and the quota allocation for the cross-country skiing events at the 2022 Winter Olympics in Beijing.

== Qualification rules ==
=== Basic Quota ===
A total of 296 athletes will be allowed to compete in cross-country skiing, 148 men and 148 women. For any National Olympic Committee to send at least one male, or one female competitor, they must have an athlete of that gender score less than 300 FIS points in any individual event at either the 2021 World Championships, or the under 23 World Championships.

=== 'A' Standard ===
An athlete who has less than 100 FIS Distance points on the list published on 17 January 2022, can be entered in any event.

=== 'B' Standard ===
An athlete who has not met the 'A' standard, but has less than 300 FIS Distance points may be entered in the 15 km men's or 10 km women's race, as well as in the team relay. Similarly, athletes who have less than 300 FIS Sprint points may be entered in the sprint, or the team sprint.

=== Additional Relay eligibility ===
Athletes who are entered in Nordic Combined or Biathlon, at the 2022 Olympics, may also be used in the relay events. They must have a valid FIS code and have met the appropriate 'B' standard.

== Allocation of Quotas ==
Quota per NOC.

A FIS Cross Country Nation Ranking will be used that takes into account results, from each gender, from the 2020-2021 season. Nations ranked one through five will receive four additional quotas, nations six through ten receive three, nations eleven through twenty receive two, and nations twenty-one through thirty receive one.

Remaining quota places.

In each gender, the remainder of the quota places will be distributed in four rounds using the Nation Ranking proceeding from the highest ranked nation down. Nations from 1 to 5 receive an additional quota in round one. Nations from 1 to 10 receive an additional quota in round two. Nations from 1 to 20 receive an quota in round three. All remaining quotas are distributed in round four.

Host quota

If the host has not received four quotas, in each gender, and have remaining athletes who have met at least the 'B' standard, they will be allotted up to four athletes per gender.

== Quota Allocation ==
As of 22 January 2021.

=== Current summary ===
Each NOC listed has qualified one competitor in the gender indicated, numbers higher than one are based on rankings and will change as rankings change.

Nations	Men	Women	Reallocated men	Reallocated women	Athletes
Andorra	~~2~~ 1	~~2~~ 1			2
Argentina	1	1			2
Armenia	1	2			3
Australia	3	2	1		6
Austria	3	~~4~~ 2			5
Belarus	2	2			4
Belgium	1				1
Bolivia	1				1
Bosnia and Herzegovina	1	1			2
Brazil	1	2			3
Bulgaria	1				1
Canada	3	4	1	1	9
Chile	1				1
China	4	4		1	9
Colombia	1				1
Croatia	1	2			3
Czech Republic	5	~~7~~ 5	1		11
Denmark	~~1~~ 0				0
Estonia	3	4	1	1	9
Finland	6	7			13
France	8	4		1	13
Germany	6	8			14
Great Britain	3				3
Greece	1	2			3
Hungary	1	1			2
Iceland	2	1			3
Iran	1				1
Ireland	~~3~~ 1				1
Italy	6	~~7~~ 6			12
Japan	3	4	1		8
Kazakhstan	2	4		1	7
Latvia	2	4		1	7
Lebanon	1				1
Liechtenstein		1			1
Lithuania	2	2			4
Luxembourg	~~1~~ 0				0
Mexico	1				1
Mongolia	1	1			2
Montenegro	1				1
New Zealand	~~1~~ 0				0
Nigeria	1				1
North Macedonia	1	1			2
Norway	8	8			16
Poland	3	4	1	1	9
Portugal	1				1
ROC	8	8			16
Romania	2	1			3
Serbia	~~1~~ 0	~~2~~ 0			0
Slovakia	2	2		1	5
Slovenia	3	6	1		10
South Korea	2	2		1	5
Spain	~~3~~ 2	~~1~~ 0			2
Sweden	8	8			16
Switzerland	8	6			14
Thailand	1	~~2~~ 1			2
Turkey	1	2			3
Ukraine	2	4		1	7
United States	5	8	1		14
Total: 58 NOCs	140	138	8	10	296

=== Men ===
Criteria	Athletes per NOC	Total Athletes	Qualified
Basic quota and ranked in the top 5	5	25	France; Norway; ROC; Sweden; Switzerland
Basic quota and ranked 6th through 10th	4	20	Czech Republic; Finland; Germany; Italy; United States
Basic quota and ranked 11th through 20th	3	30	Australia; Austria; Canada; Estonia; Great Britain; Ireland; Japan; Poland; Slovenia; Spain
Basic quota and ranked 21st through 30th	2	20	Andorra; Belarus; Iceland; Kazakhstan; Latvia; Lithuania; Romania; Slovakia; South Korea; Ukraine
Basic quota	1	26	Argentina; Armenia; Belgium; Bolivia; Bosnia and Herzegovina; Brazil; Bulgaria; Chile; Colombia; Croatia; Denmark; Greece; Hungary; Iran; Lebanon; Luxembourg; Mexico; Mongolia; Montenegro; New Zealand; Nigeria; North Macedonia; Portugal; Serbia; Thailand; Turkey
Host quota	4	4	China
Total		125	57

=== Remaining quotas ===
Round 1	Round 2	Round 3	Next available
ROC; France; Norway; Switzerland; Sweden	ROC; France; Norway; Switzerland; Sweden; Finland; Italy; Germany; United States; Czech Republic	ROC; France; Norway; Switzerland; Sweden; Finland; Italy; Germany	United States; Czech Republic; ~~Great Britain~~; Canada; Poland; Estonia; ~~Austria~~; Japan; Australia; Slovenia; Spain; Ireland; Finland; Italy; Germany
5	10	8	8

=== Women ===
Criteria	Athletes per NOC	Total Athletes	Qualified
Basic quota and ranked in the top 5	5	25	Germany; Norway; ROC; Sweden; United States
Basic quota and ranked 6th through 10th	4	20	Czech Republic; Finland; Italy; Switzerland; Slovenia
Basic quota and ranked 11th through 20th	3	30	Austria; Canada; China; Estonia; France; Japan; Kazakhstan; Latvia; Poland; Ukraine
Basic quota and ranked 21st through 33rd	2	26	Andorra; Armenia; Australia; Belarus; Brazil; Croatia; Greece; Lithuania; Serbia; Slovakia; South Korea; ~~Thailand~~ (Note: a quota will need to be returned due to lack of enough eligible athletes); Turkey
Basic quota	1	9	Argentina; Bosnia and Herzegovina; Hungary; Iceland; Liechtenstein; Mongolia; North Macedonia; Romania; Spain; Thailand
Total		110	42

=== Remaining quotas ===
Round 1	Round 2	Round 3	Round 4	Next available
Sweden; ROC; United States; Germany; Norway	Sweden; ROC; United States; Germany; Norway; Finland; Czech Republic; Italy; Switzerland; Slovenia	Sweden; ROC; United States; Germany; Norway; Finland; Czech Republic; Italy; Switzerland; Slovenia; France; Poland; Austria; Canada; Ukraine; China; Latvia; Japan; Estonia; Kazakhstan	Finland; Czech Republic; Italy	~~Switzerland~~; ~~Slovenia~~; France; Poland; ~~Austria~~; Canada; Ukraine; China; Latvia; ~~Japan~~; Estonia; Kazakhstan; Slovakia; ~~Belarus~~; ~~Serbia~~; South Korea; Brazil; Greece; Lithuania; Andorra; Turkey
5	10	20	3	10
