= Hubert Schrott =

Austrian cross-country skier

Personal information
- Nationality: Austrian
- Born: 4 May 1935 (age 89); Villanders, Italy

Sport
- Sport: Cross-country skiing

Hubert Schrott (born 4 May 1935) is an Austrian cross-country skier. He competed in the men's 15 kilometre event at the 1964 Winter Olympics.
