= Ariunsanaagiin Enkhtuul =

Cross-country skier

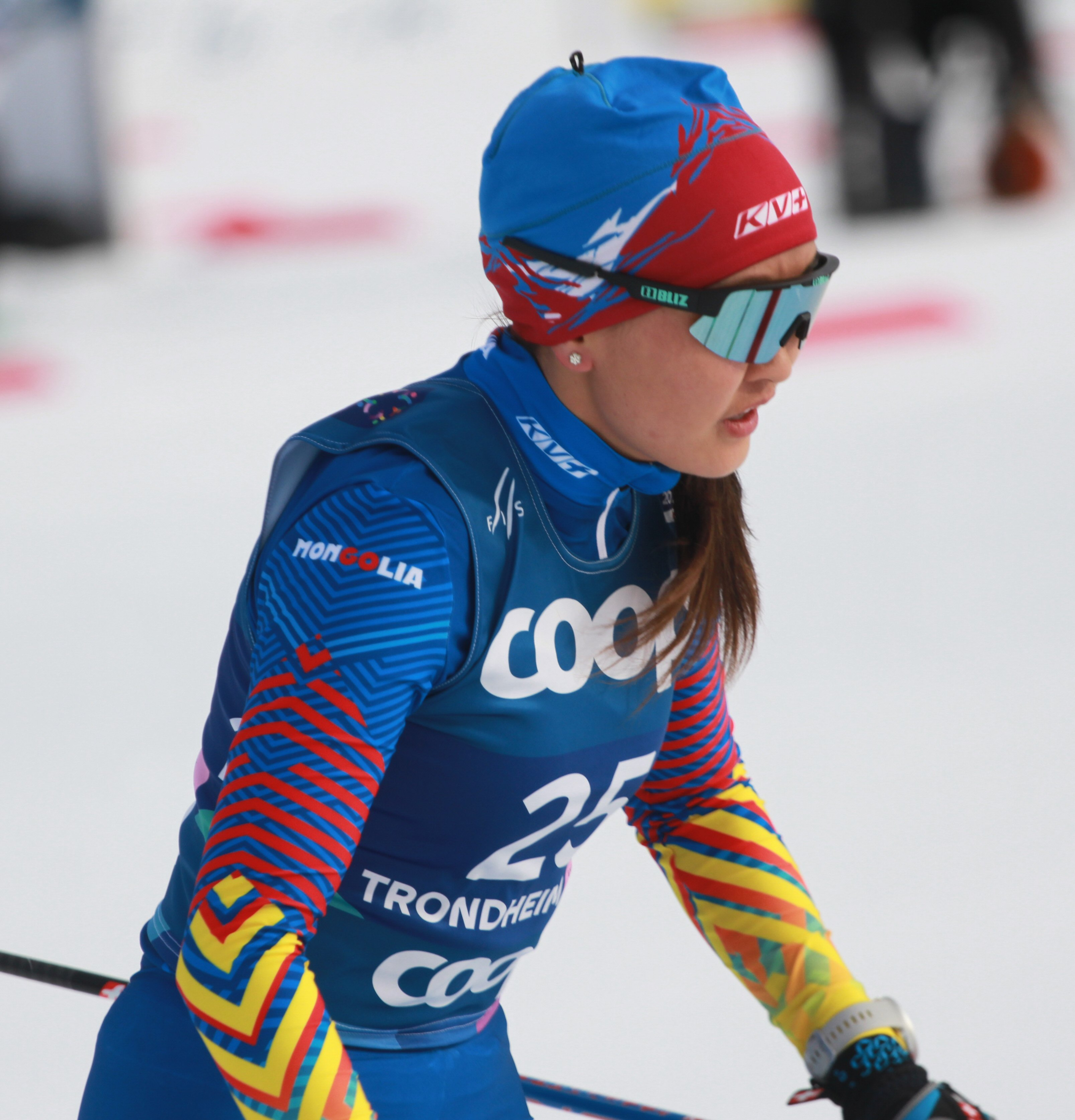

Personal information
- Native name: Ариунсанаагийн Энхтуул
- National team: Mongolia
- Born: January 14, 1996 (age 30)
- Height: 5 ft 3 in (160 cm)
- Weight: 54 kg (119 lb; 8 st 7 lb)

Sport
- Sport: Cross-country skiing

Ariunsanaagiin Enkhtuul (Mongolian: Ариунсанаагийн Энхтуул, born January 14, 1996) is a cross-country skier from Mongolia. She was a participant in the 2022 Winter Olympics in the women's 10 kilometer, and the qualification for the women's sprint. Her best finish in both events was in the qualification where she placed 79th out of 91 competitors.

== Results ==
Ariunsanaa has competed in the women's 10 kilometer and the qualification for the women's sprint. In the qualification sprint, she was 79th of 91 competitors with a time of 3 minutes and 58.25 seconds, while 1st place was won by Jonna Sundling of Sweden with a time of 3 minutes and 9.03 seconds. In the 10 kilometer, she was 85th of 98 competitors with a time of 37 minutes and 2.5 seconds, while the gold was won by Theresa Johaug of Norway.

=== Olympic Games ===
| Year | Age | 10 km | Time | Source |
|---|---|---|---|---|
| 2022 | 26 | 85th | 37:02.5 | |

=== Qualification ===
| Year | Age | Sprint | Time | Source |
|---|---|---|---|---|
| 2022 | 26 | 79th | 3:58.25 | |
