= Hermann Lackner =

Austrian cross-country skier

Personal information
- Nationality: Austrian
- Born: 26 March 1933 (age 91); Trofaiach, Austria

Sport
- Sport: Cross-country skiing

Hermann Lackner (born 26 March 1933) is an Austrian cross-country skier. He competed in the men's 15 kilometre event at the 1964 Winter Olympics.
