= Mongolia at the 2018 Winter Olympics =

- Flag of Mongolia
- IOC code: MGL
- NOC: Mongolian National Olympic Committee
- Website: www.olympic.mn (in Mongolian)

in Pyeongchang, South Korea February 9–25, 2018
- Competitors: 2 in 1 sport
- Flag bearer: Batmönkhiin Achbadrakh
- Medals: Gold 0 Silver 0 Bronze 0 Total 0

Winter Olympics appearances (overview)
- 1964; 1968; 1972; 1976; 1980; 1984; 1988; 1992; 1994; 1998; 2002; 2006; 2010; 2014; 2018; 2022; 2026

Mongolia competed at the 2018 Winter Olympics in Pyeongchang, South Korea, from February 9–25, 2018. Mongolia's team consisted of two cross-country skiers. This marked the fourth straight Winter Olympics the nation had sent two cross-country skiers, which were Batmönkhiin Achbadrakh and Chinbatyn Otgontsetseg. The delegation's best finish in any event was 73rd by Otgontsetseg in the women's 10 kilometer freestyle.

== Competitors ==
The following is the list of number of competitors participating at the Games per sport/discipline.

Sport	Men	Women	Total
Cross-country skiing	1	1	2
Total	1	1	2

== Background ==
The Mongolian National Olympic Committee was recognized by the International Olympic Committee on 1 January 1962, and the nation entered Olympic competition soon after, taking part in both the 1964 Winter and Summer Olympics. Mongolia has only missed two Olympic Games since, the 1976 Winter Olympics; and the 1984 Summer Olympics as the Mongolians joined in the Soviet-led boycott of the Games in Los Angeles. Pyeongchang marked the Mongolian's fifteenth appearance at a Winter Olympic Games. The delegation sent to Pyeongchang consisted of two cross-country skiers; Batmönkhiin Achbadrakh and Chinbatyn Otgontsetseg. The Mongolian team was the first officially welcomed team at the Games, and Batmönkhiin Achbadrakh was chosen as the flag bearer for the opening ceremony, while Chinbatyn Otgontsetseg was selected for the closing ceremony.

== Cross-country skiing ==
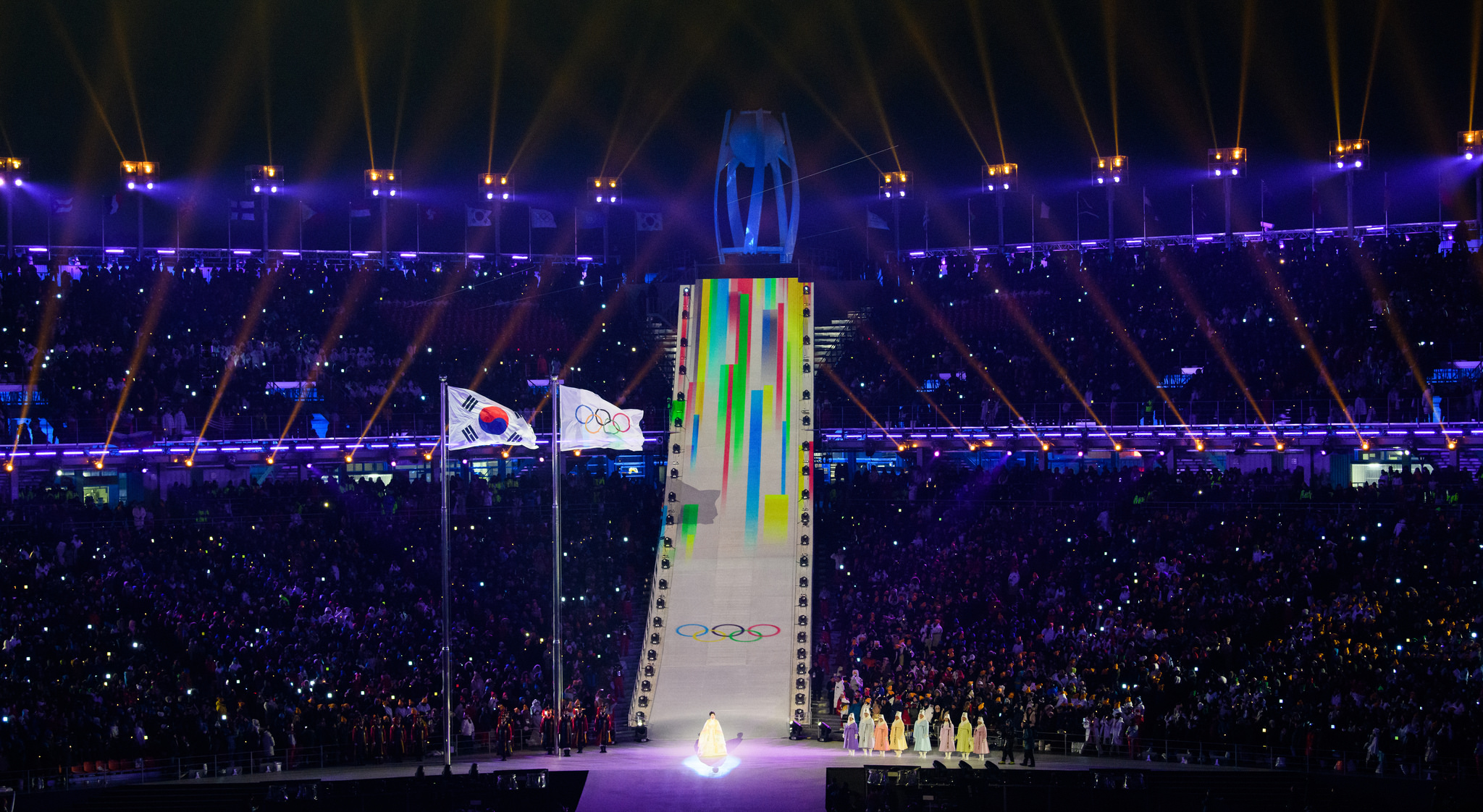
Opening ceremony at the 2018 Pyeongchang Winter Olympics.

Batmönkhiin Achbadrakh was 24 years old at the time of these Olympics, and he made his Olympic debut. On February 12, he took part in the men's 15 kilometer freestyle race, finishing with a time of 41 minutes and 40.4 seconds, which put him in 93rd place of 119 competitors; the gold medal being won by Dario Cologna of Switzerland in a time of 33 minutes and 43.9 seconds.

Chinbatyn Otgontsetseg was 27 years old at the time of the Pyeongchang Olympics. She had previously represented Mongolia at the 2014 Winter Olympics and took part in the women's Classic 10 kilometres both times. She got a time of 32 minutes and 52.1 seconds, which put her in 84th place of 90 competitors; the gold medal being won by Ragnhild Haga with a time of 25 minutes and 0.5 seconds.

Athlete	Event	Final		
Athlete	Event	Time	Deficit	Rank
Achbadrakh Batmunkh	Men's 15 km freestyle	41:40.4	+7:56.5	93
Otgontsetseg Chinbat	Women's 10 km freestyle	32:52.1	+7:51.6	84

== See also ==
- Mongolia at the 2017 Asian Winter Games
- Mongolia at the 2018 Winter Paralympics
- Mongolia at the 2018 Summer Youth Olympics
