= Simo Rinne =

Finnish speed skater

Personal information
- Nationality: Finnish
- Born: 2 August 1941; Tampere, Finland
- Died: 28 September 2015 (aged 74)

Sport
- Sport: Speed skating

Simo Rinne (2 August 1941 – 28 September 2015) was a Finnish speed skater. He competed in the men's 500 metres at the 1964 Winter Olympics.
