= Dambadarjaagiin Baadai =

Mongolian cross-country skier (born 1941)

Personal information
- Nationality: Mongolian
- Born: 20 April 1941 (age 83)

Sport
- Sport: Cross-country skiing

Dambadarjaagiin Baadai (born 20 April 1941) is a Mongolian cross-country skier. He competed in the men's 15 kilometre event at the 1964 Winter Olympics.
