= Tömörbaataryn Nyamdavaa =

Mongolian speed skater (born 1960)

Personal information
- Nationality: Mongolian
- Born: 5 May 1960 (age 64)

Sport
- Sport: Speed skating

Tömörbaataryn Nyamdavaa (born 5 May 1960) is a Mongolian speed skater. He competed in four events at the 1980 Winter Olympics.
