= Banzragchiin Zundui =

Mongolian cross-country skier (born 1937)

Personal information
- Nationality: Mongolian
- Born: 14 October 1937 (age 87)

Sport
- Sport: Cross-country skiing

Banzragchiin Zundui (born 14 October 1937) is a Mongolian cross-country skier. He competed in the men's 15 kilometre event at the 1964 Winter Olympics.
