= Lennart Johansson (ice hockey) =

Swedish ice hockey player (1941–2010)

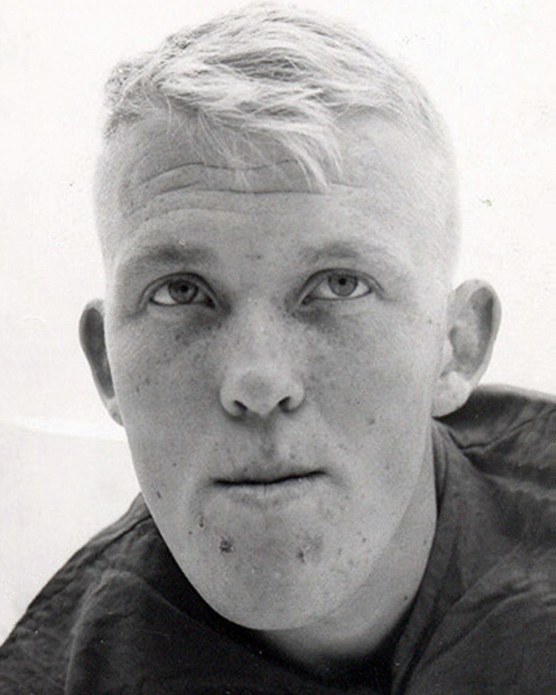

Personal information
- Nickname: Tigern (Tiger)
- Born: 7 June 1941 Sundsvall, Sweden
- Died: 23 October 2010 (aged 69) Gävle, Sweden
- Height: 188 cm (6 ft 2 in)
- Weight: 87 kg (192 lb)

Sport
- Sport: Ice hockey
- Club: Brynäs IF, Gävle
Medal record
Representing Sweden
Olympic Games
Silver medal – second place	1964 Innsbruck	Team

Rolf Lennart Johansson (7 June 1941 – 23 October 2010) was a Swedish ice hockey defender. He was a key figure in Brynäs IF, winning seven national titles as a player (1964, 1966–68 and 1970–72) and then one as a coach in 1980. Internationally he competed only at the 1964 Winter Olympics, where he won a silver medal.

After retiring from competitions Johansson worked as a coach, and prepared the Swedish team to the 1976 World Championships. He was later employed at the Culture & Recreation department of the Gävle municipality.
