= Nyamdondovyn Ganbold =

Mongolian speed skater (born 1973)

Personal information
- Nationality: Mongolian
- Born: 5 March 1973 (age 52); Ulaanbaatar, Mongolia

Sport
- Sport: Speed skating

Nyamdondovyn Ganbold (born 5 March 1973) is a Mongolian speed skater. He competed in two events at the 1992 Winter Olympics.
