= Tsedenjavyn Lkhamjav =

Mongolian speed skater (1940–2019)

Personal information
- Nationality: Mongolian
- Born: 12 September 1940; Möngönmorit, Mongolia
- Died: 15 February 2019 (aged 78)

Sport
- Sport: Speed skating

Tsedenjavyn Lkhamjav (12 September 1940 – 15 February 2019) was a Mongolian speed skater. She competed in two events at the 1964 Winter Olympics.
