= Dorjiin Tsenddoo =

Mongolian speed skater (born 1954)

Personal information
- Nationality: Mongolian
- Born: 25 August 1954 (age 70)

Sport
- Sport: Speed skating

Dorjiin Tsenddoo (Mongolian: Доржийн Цэнддоо, Dorjiin Tsenddoo; born 25 August 1954) is a Mongolian speed skater. He competed in three events at the 1980 Winter Olympics. He is also a current board member for the Mongolian Skating Association
