= Boldyn Sansarbileg =

Mongolian speed skater (born 1976)

Boldyn Sansarbileg (Mongolian: Болдын Сансарбилэг; born April 12, 1976, in Beijing, China) is a Mongolian short track speed skater. Sansarbileg represented Mongolia at the 1998 Winter Olympics in Nagano along with fellow short track speed skater Battulgyn Oktyabri. Sansarbileg, the flagbearer for Mongolia at the Olympics, competed at the men's 1000 metres and placed 4th in his heat without advancing to the second round. He placed 29th of the 30 skaters to have competed in the 1000 m event, finishing the distance in a time of 1:39.913.
