= Krisztián Szabó (speed skater) =

Hungarian speed skater (1974–2024)

Personal information
- Nationality: Hungarian
- Born: 19 June 1974 Debrecen, Hungary
- Died: 24 July 2024 (aged 50)

Sport
- Sport: Short track speed skating

Krisztián Szabó (19 June 1974 – 24 July 2024) was a Hungarian short track speed skater. He competed in the men's 500 metres event at the 2002 Winter Olympics. Szabó died in July 2024, at the age of 50.
