= Jonny Nilsson =

Swedish speed skater (1943–2022)

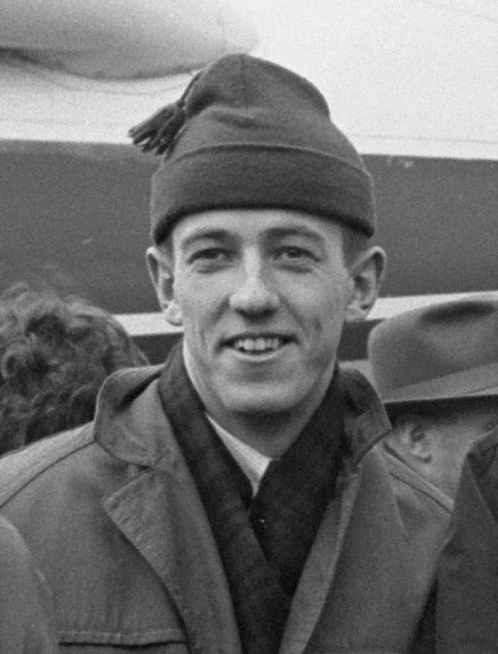
- Nilsson in 1962

Personal information
- Born: Erling Martin Jonny Nilsson; 9 February 1943 Gothenburg, Sweden
- Died: 22 June 2022 (aged 79)
- Height: 1.80 m (5 ft 11 in)
- Weight: 71 kg (157 lb)

Sport
- Sport: Speed skating
- Club: Bofors Cykelklubb; IK Wega, Göteborg

Achievements and titles
- Personal best(s): 500 m: 42.2 (1966); 1000 m: 1:33.1 (1969); 1500 m: 2:08.2 (1966); 3000 m: 4:27.3 (1963); 5000 m: 7:32.9 (1968); 10 000 m: 15:33.0 (1963)
Medal record
Representing Sweden
Olympic Games
Gold medal – first place	1964 Innsbruck	10000 m
World Championships
Gold medal – first place	1963 Karuizawa	Allround
Bronze medal – third place	1966 Gothenburg	Allround

Erling Martin Jonny Nilsson (9 February 1943 – 22 June 2022) was a Swedish competitive speed skater. He was the men's Olympic champion in the 10 000 m speed skating event in 1964 in Innsbruck.

== Biography ==
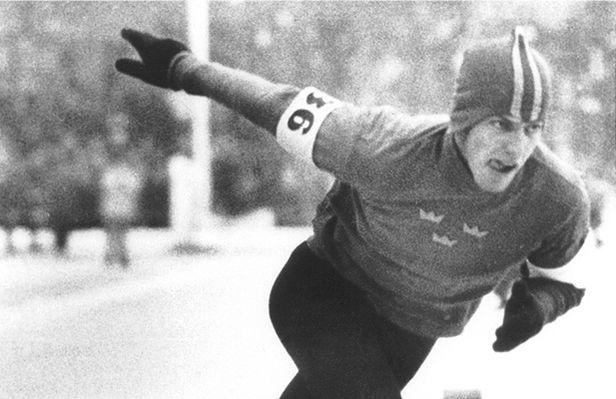
Jonny Nilsson at the 1964 Winter Olympics.

Aged 19 Nilsson made his international debut at the European Allround Championships in 1962, finishing 15th. Nilsson had trouble with the 500 m, which clearly showed at the World Allround Championships two weeks later – despite a 1st place on the 10,000 m and a 2nd place on the 5000 m, he finished only 10th overall because he had finished the 500 m in 45th place. For his accomplishments, Nilsson received the 1962 Oscar Mathisen Award. The next year at the World Allround Championships, he finished 23rd on the 500 m, but with a 6th place on the 1500 m and wins on both the 5,000 m and the 10000 m (both in new world record times), he made up his deficit and became World Allround Champion with a new world record samalog for the combination of the four distances.

At the 1964 Winter Olympics in Innsbruck, Nilsson was still the world record holder on both the 5000 m and the 10000 m, but he finished only 6th on the 5000 m. Two days later, though, he became Olympic Champion on the 10000 m. In 1965, Nilsson finished 4th at the World Allround Championships, despite winning both the 5000 m (in a new world record time) and the 10000 m. His last international medal came the following year at the 1966 World Allround Championships, where he won bronze. He participated in the 5000 m and the 10000 m at the 1968 Winter Olympics in Grenoble, but did not win any medals.

Besides his international successes, Nilsson won many national titles. He was Swedish Allround Champion four times (1964–1967) and won a total of 13 Swedish Single Distance Championships – twice on the 1,500 m (1966–1967), five times on the 5,000 m (1962–1966), and six times on the 10,000 m (1963–1968).

Nilsson earned the Svenska Dagbladet Gold Medal in 1963. He was not related to his speed skating rival Ivar Nilsson.

Nilsson died on 22 June 2022 at the age of 79.

== Records ==
=== World records ===
Over the course of his career, Nilsson skated five world records:

Discipline	Time	Date	Location
5000 m	7.34,3	23 February 1963	(Japan) Karuizawa
10,000 m	15.33,0	24 February 1963	(Japan) Karuizawa
Big combination	178.447	24 February 1963	(Japan) Karuizawa
3000 m	4.27,6	23 March 1963	(Norway) Tolga
5000 m	7.33,2	13 February 1965	(Norway) Oslo

=== Personal records ===
Distance	Result	Date	Location
500 m	42.2	9 February 1966	Davos
1000 m	1:33.1	19 January 1969	Gothenburg
1500 m	2:08.2	2 February 1966	Davos
3000 m	4:27.6	23 March 1963	Tolga
5000 m	7:32.9	15 February 1968	Grenoble
10000 m	15:33.0	24 February 1963	Karuizawa
Big combination	178.447	24 February 1963	Karuizawa

Nilsson was number one on the Adelskalender, the all-time allround speed skating ranking, for a total of 329 days, from February 1963 to January 1964. He has an Adelskalender score of 176.873 points.

Awards
Preceded by (Netherlands) Henk van der Grift	Oscar Mathisen Award; 1962	Succeeded by (Norway) Nils Aaness
Preceded by (Sweden) Assar Rönnlund	Svenska Dagbladet Gold Medal; 1963	Succeeded by (Sweden) Rolf Peterson
