= Gendgeegiin Batmönkh =

Mongolian cross-country skier (born 1944)

Personal information
- Nationality: Mongolian
- Born: 10 August 1944 (age 80); Khövsgöl, Mongolia

Sport
- Sport: Cross-country skiing

Gendgeegiin Batmönkh (born 10 August 1944) is a Mongolian cross-country skier. He competed in the men's 15 kilometre event at the 1968 Winter Olympics.
