= Ivar Nilsson =

Swedish speed skater (1933–2019)

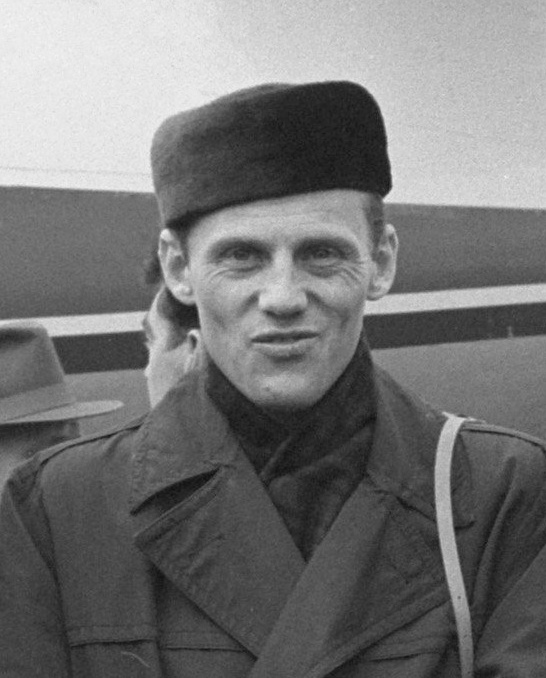
- Ivar Nilsson in 1962

Personal information
- Born: 12 June 1933 Gothenburg, Sweden
- Died: 26 February 2019 (aged 85)

Sport
- Sport: Speed skating
- Club: IK Wega, Göteborg
Medal record
Representing Sweden
World Championships
| Bronze medal – third place | 1962 Moscow | All-round |

Ivar Bengt Nilsson (12 June 1933 – 26 February 2019) was a Swedish speed skater who won a bronze all-round medal at the 1962 world championships. He competed at the 1960 and 1964 Winter Olympics in 1,500 m, 5,000 m and 10,000 m events with his best achievement having been a fourth place finish in the 10,000 m event in 1960.

He was not related to his speed skating rival Jonny Nilsson.

Personal bests:

- 500 m – 42.6 (1963)
- 1500 m – 2:10.5 (1963)
- 5000 m – 7:42.8 (1964)
- 10000 m – 16:02.9 (1963)
