= Dashzevegiin Ochirsükh =

Mongolian cross-country skier (born 1977)

Personal information
- Nationality: Mongolian
- Born: 7 December 1977 (age 47)

Sport
- Sport: Cross-country skiing

Dashzevegiin Ochirsükh (born 7 December 1977) is a Mongolian cross-country skier. He competed in the men's 10 kilometre classical event at the 1998 Winter Olympics.
