= Vangansürengiin Renchinkhorol =

Mongolian cross-country skier (born 1960)

Personal information
- Nationality: Mongolian
- Born: 18 March 1960 (age 66)

Sport
- Sport: Cross-country skiing

Vangansürengiin Renchinkhorol (born 1 June 1959) is a Mongolian cross-country skier. He competed in the men's 15 kilometre event at the 1984 Winter Olympics.
