= Altangadasyn Sodnomdarjaa =

Mongolian speed skater (born 1968)

Personal information
- Nationality: Mongolian
- Born: 16 January 1968 (age 57); Ulaanbaatar, Mongolia

Sport
- Sport: Speed skating

Altangadasyn Sodnomdarjaa (born 16 January 1968) is a Mongolian speed skater. He competed in two events at the 1992 Winter Olympics.
