= Dondogiin Gankhuyag =

Mongolian cross-country skier (born 1961)

Personal information
- Nationality: Mongolian
- Born: 22 October 1961 (age 63)

Sport
- Sport: Cross-country skiing

Dondogiin Gankhuyag (born 22 October 1961) is a Mongolian cross-country skier. He competed in the men's 15 kilometre event at the 1984 Winter Olympics.
