= Danzangiin Narantungalag =

Mongolian cross-country skier (born 1945)

Personal information
- Nationality: Mongolian
- Born: 29 January 1945 (age 80)

Sport
- Sport: Cross-country skiing

Danzangiin Narantungalag (born 29 January 1945) is a Mongolian cross-country skier. He competed in the men's 15 kilometre event at the 1972 Winter Olympics.
