= Björn Lekman =

Swedish speed skater

Personal information
- Nationality: Swedish
- Born: 11 October 1944 (age 80); Värnamo, Sweden

Sport
- Sport: Speed skating

Björn Lekman (born 11 October 1944) is a Swedish speed skater. He competed in the men's 500 metres at the 1964 Winter Olympics.
