= Ganbatyn Jargalanchuluun =

Mongolian speed skater (born 1986)

Ganbatyn Jargalanchuluun (Mongolian: Ганбатын Жаргаланчулуун; born July 13, 1986) is a Mongolian short track speed skater. Jargalanchuluun competed at the 2002 Winter Olympics in Salt Lake City, where he became the youngest Mongolian athlete to compete at the Winter Olympic Games at the age of 15 years and 225 days.
