= Bizyaagiin Dashgai =

Mongolian biathlete (born 1935)

Personal information
- Nationality: Mongolian
- Born: 5 January 1935 (age 90); Khövsgöl, Mongolia

Sport
- Sport: Biathlon, cross-country skiing

Bizyaagiin Dashgai (born 5 January 1935) is a Mongolian biathlete. He competed at the 1964 Winter Olympics and the 1968 Winter Olympics.
