= Manne Lavås =

Swedish speed skater (born 1944)

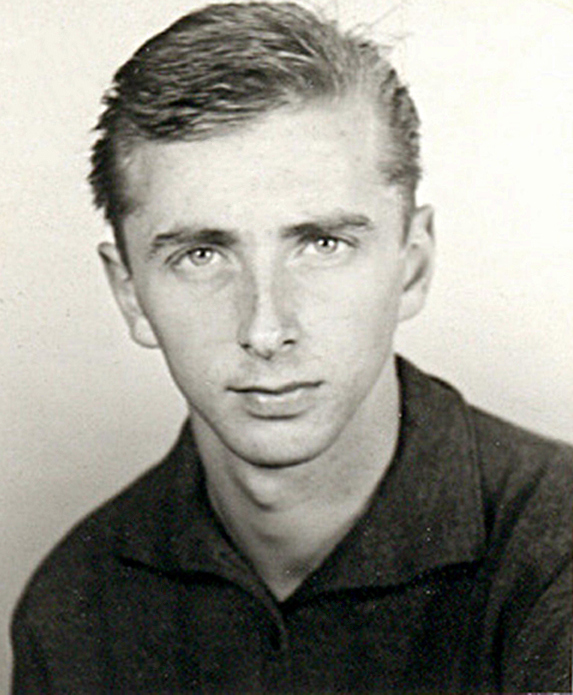

Personal information
- Born: 21 February 1944 (age 82) Gothenburg, Sweden
- Height: 182 cm (6 ft 0 in)
- Weight: 71 kg (157 lb)

Sport
- Sport: Speed skating
- Club: IFK Göteborg

Achievements and titles
- Personal bests: 500 m – 40.5 (1968); 1000 m – 1:24.5 (1968); 1500 m – 2:06.2 (1968); 5000 m – 7:53.3 (1968); 10000 m – 17:24.8 (1964)

Sven Manne Lavås (born 21 February 1944) is a retired Swedish speed skater. He competed in the 500 m and 1500 m events at the 1964 and 1968 Winter Olympics and finished in 16–29th place.
