= Bo Ollander =

Swedish speed skater

Personal information
- Nationality: Swedish
- Born: 25 July 1943; Strömsund, Sweden
- Died: 9 March 1973 (aged 29); Stockholm, Sweden

Sport
- Sport: Speed skating

Bo Ollander (25 July 1943 – 9 March 1973) was a Swedish speed skater. He competed in two events at the 1964 Winter Olympics.
