= Sodnomtserengiin Natsagdorj =

Mongolian cross-country skier (born 1938)

Personal information
- Nationality: Mongolian
- Born: 10 September 1938 (age 86)

Sport
- Sport: Cross-country skiing

Sodnomtserengiin Natsagdorj (born 10 September 1938) is a Mongolian cross-country skier. He competed in the men's 15 kilometre event at the 1964 Winter Olympics.
