= Heike Hedlund =

Swedish speed skater

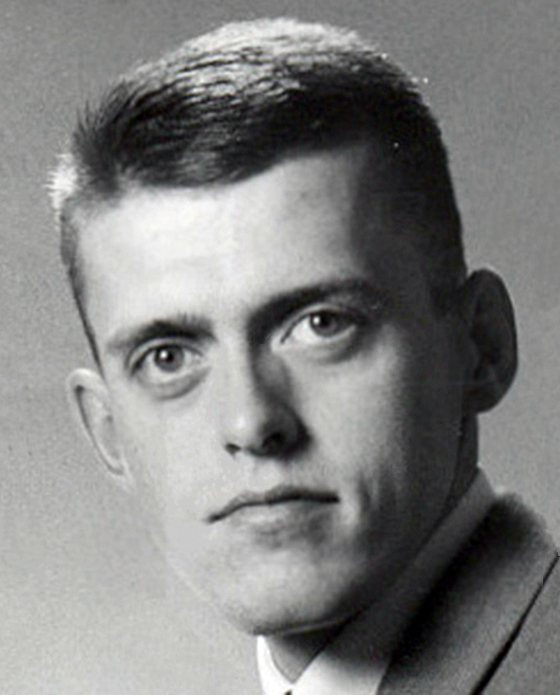

Personal information
- Born: 15 March 1942 (age 84) Lit, Östersund, Sweden
- Height: 176 cm (5 ft 9 in)
- Weight: 61 kg (134 lb)

Sport
- Sport: Speed skating
- Club: IF Castor, Östersund

Achievements and titles
- Personal bests: 500 m – 39.8 (1968); 1000 m – 1:24.0 (1968); 1500 m – 2:10.2 (1964); 5000 m – 8:39.6 (1964); 10000 m – 18:19.9 (1964)

Per Heike Hedlund (born 15 March 1942) is a retired Swedish speed skater. He competed in the 500 m event at the 1964 and 1968 Winter Olympics and finished in 7th and 15th place, respectively.
