= Jargalyn Erdenetülkhüür =

Mongolian cross-country skier (born 1978)

Personal information
- Nationality: Mongolian
- Born: 13 September 1978 (age 46); Ulaanbaatar, Mongolia

Sport
- Sport: Cross-country skiing

Jargalyn Erdenetülkhüür (born 13 September 1978) is a Mongolian cross-country skier. He competed in the men's 15 kilometre classical event at the 2002 Winter Olympics.
