= Batchuluuny Bat-Orgil =

Mongolian speed skater (born 1969)

Batchuluuny Bat–Orgil (Mongolian: Батчулууны Бат–Оргил; born March 16, 1969) is a Mongolian short track speed skater.

Bat–Orgil gained attention at the 1994 Winter Olympics in Lillehammer when he was the sole athlete in the Mongolian team. He participated in two short track speed skating events, the men's 500 metres (24th) and the men's 1000 metres (29th).

The Mongolian team was originally unable to qualify any athletes for the 1994 Winter Olympics because of stricter standards ordered by international sporting federations, but when the North Korean team elected not to participate, several spots opened up in short track speed skating. By then, the Mongolians had left their temporary training base in Germany and headed home. Bat-Orgil, one of those eligible, needed eight days to reach Mongolia by train. When he arrived, a fax was waiting from the Lillehammer Olympic Organizing Committee. Bat-Orgil got back on the train and headed west.

He missed the opening ceremony but was able to participate in the closing ceremony as a flagbearer for Mongolia.
