= Lennart Häggroth =

Swedish ice hockey player (1940–2016)

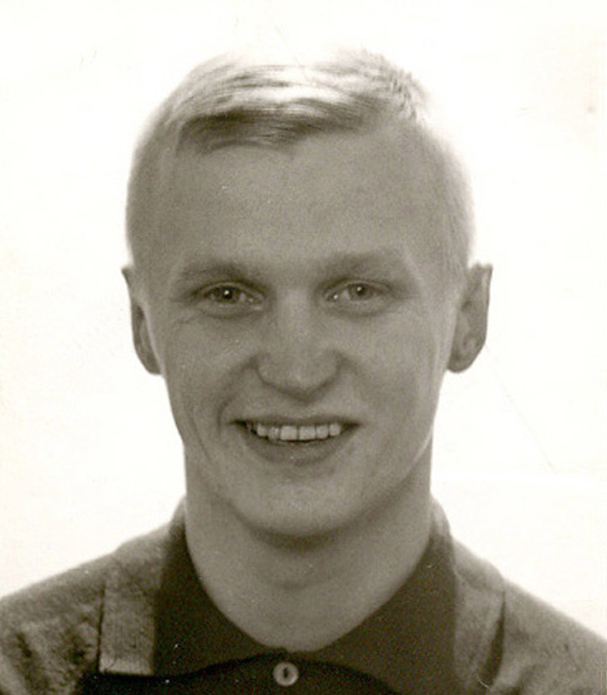
- Lennart Häggroth in the mid 1960's

Personal information
- Born: 2 March 1940 Övertorneå, Sweden
- Died: 28 August 2016 (aged 76) Skellefteå, Sweden
- Height: 180 cm (5 ft 11 in)
- Weight: 76 kg (168 lb)

Sport
- Sport: Ice hockey
- Club: Kiruna AIF (1954–61, and 1966–68); Skellefteå AIK (1961–66); Clemensnäs (1969–73)
Medal record
Representing Sweden
Olympic Games
Silver medal – second place	1964 Innsbruck	Team
World Championships
Gold medal – first place	1962 Colorado Springs/Denver	Team
Silver medal – second place	1963 Stockholm	Team

Hans Lennart Häggroth (2 March 1940 – 28 August 2016) was a Swedish ice hockey player. A goaltender, he won a world and European title in 1962, finishing second at the 1963 World Championships and 1964 Olympics.

Häggroth was a back-up for Kjell Svensson, and hence capped only 65 times for the national team between 1960 and 1965. Before the 1962 World Championships, Svensson got injured, but Häggroth did fine, helping win the tournament and becoming its best goaltender. After retiring from hockey, Häggroth became a social worker, helping drug addicts and alcoholics. He died on 28 August 2016 at his home.
