= Luvsandashiin Dorj =

Mongolian cross-country skier (born 1943)

Personal information
- Nationality: Mongolian
- Born: 15 July 1943 (age 81)

Sport
- Sport: Cross-country skiing

Luvsandashiin Dorj (born 15 July 1943) is a Mongolian cross-country skier. He competed at the 1980 Winter Olympics and the 1984 Winter Olympics.
