= Batmönkhiin Achbadrakh =

Mongolian cross-country skier (born 1994)

Batmönkhiin Achbadrakh (Mongolian: Батмөнхийн Ачбадрах, born 21 December 1994) is a Mongolian cross-country skier who competed for Mongolia at the 2018 Winter Olympics. He was their flag bearer at the opening ceremony. He also competed in the 2022 Winter Olympics, where he placed 65th in the Men's 15km classic.
