= Ziitsagaany Ganbat =

Mongolian cross-country skier (born 1967)

Personal information
- Nationality: Mongolian
- Born: 1 March 1967 (age 58)

Sport
- Sport: Cross-country skiing

Ziitsagaany Ganbat (born 1 March 1967) is a Mongolian cross-country skier. He competed at the 1988 Winter Olympics in Calgary, Canada and the 1992 Winter Olympics in Albertville, France.
