= Erdene-Ochiryn Ochirsüren =

Mongolian cross-country skier (born 1985)

Personal information
- Born: July 14, 1985 Mongolia
- Height: 1.64 m (5 ft 4 1/2 in)

Sport
- Sport: Skiing
- Updated on 13 February 2010

Erdene-Ochiryn Ochirsüren (born 14 July 1985) is a cross-country skier from Mongolia. She was the national flagbearer for the Mongolian team at the 2010 Winter Olympics opening ceremony; at the 2010 Winter Olympics she participated in the 10 kilometre freestyle competition, finishing 74th. Ochirsuren also participated in the 2006 Winter Olympics in Turin, where she finished 68th in the 10 kilometre classical competition.

Ochirsuren's best finish at the FIS Nordic World Ski Championships was 65th in the individual sprint event at Oberstdorf in 2005. Her best World Cup finish was 74th at a sprint event in Finland in 2008.

She was born in Töv Province, and now resides in Ulan Bator. When away from home during competition, she sometimes plays "a cassette with my family and my room" to mitigate homesickness, and communicates with her family by video.
