= Davaagiin Enkhee =

Mongolian skier (born 1964)

Personal information
- Nationality: Mongolian
- Born: 29 July 1964 (age 60); Malchin, Mongolia

Sport
- Sport: Cross-country skiing

Davaagiin Enkhee (born 29 July 1964) is a Mongolian cross-country skier. She competed at the 1988 Winter Olympics and the 2002 Winter Olympics.
