= Khürelbaataryn Khash-Erdene =

Mongolian cross-country skier (born 1983)

Personal information
- Born: November 14, 1983 Mongolia
- Height: 1.80 m (5 ft 11 in)

Sport
- Sport: Skiing
- Club: Aldar Sports Club
- Updated on 13 February 2010

Khürelbaataryn Khash-Erdene (born 14 November 1983) is a Mongolian cross-country skier who has competed since 2003. Competing in two Winter Olympics, he earned his best finish of 85th in the 15 km event at Turin in 2006.

Khash-Erdene's best finish at the FIS Nordic World Ski Championships was 72nd in the individual sprint event at Oberstdorf in 2005.

His best World Cup finish was 77th in an individual sprint event at Italy in 2009.
