= Battulgyn Oktyabri =

Mongolian speed skater (born 1980)

Battulgyn Oktyabri (Mongolian: Баттулгын Октябрь; born November 7, 1980) is a Mongolian short track speed skater and two-time Olympian.
