= Luvsan-Ayuushiin Dashdemberel =

Mongolian cross-country skier (1940–2025)

Personal information
- Nationality: Mongolian
- Born: 17 May 1940 Selenge, Mongolia
- Died: July 2025 (aged 85)

Sport
- Sport: Cross-country skiing

Luvsan-Ayuushiin Dashdemberel (17 May 1940 – July 2025) is a Mongolian cross-country skier. He competed at the 1964 Winter Olympics and the 1968 Winter Olympics.

Dashdemberel died in July 2025, at the age of 85.
