= Luvsanlkhagvyn Dashnyam =

Mongolian speed skater (1940–2017)

Personal information
- Nationality: Mongolian
- Born: 15 May 1940 (age 84); Bulgan, Mongolia

Sport
- Sport: Speed skating

Luvsanlkhagvyn Dashnyam (5 May 1940 – 3 March 2017) was a Mongolian speed skater. He competed at the 1964 Winter Olympics, the 1968 Winter Olympics and the 1972 Winter Olympics.
