= Luvsansharavyn Tsend =

Mongolian speed skater (1940–2023)

Luvsansharavyn Tsend (Mongolian: Лувсаншаравын Цэнд, 11 July 1940 – 21 August 2023) was a Mongolian speedskater, who competed at top international levels from 1964 to 1972, with best results in the longer distances.

Tsend participated in three Olympics, Innsbruck, 1964, Grenoble, 1968 and Sapporo, 1972, with a 24th place in the 1972 10,000-m his best result. His personal best times were 42.1 (500-m, 1971), 2:14.9 (1500-m, 1971), 7:59.8 (5000-m, 1969), 16:10.2 (10000-m, 1970). Following his active competition days, Tsend had been coaching national-level speedskaters.

Tsend was the first person in Mongolia to be diagnosed with hemophilia.
