= Mongolian National Olympic Committee =

National Olympic committee of Mongolia

- Country: Mongolia
- [[|]]
- Code: MGL
- Created: 1956
- Recognized: 1962
- Continental Association: OCA
- Headquarters: Ulaanbaatar, Mongolia
- President: Battushig Batbold
- Secretary General: Enkhbat Badar-Uugan
- Website: www.olympic.mn

The Mongolian National Olympic Committee (Mongolian: Монголын Үндэсний олимпийн хороо) is the National Olympic Committee representing Mongolia.

== History ==
The Mongolian National Olympic Committee was established on February 26, 1956, and sanctioned by the MPRP Central Committee and the Council of Minister of the People's Republic of 2-joint 42/37 on April 26, 1956. It has since become an independent non-government organization in order to comply with the International Olympic Games Charter and Rules.

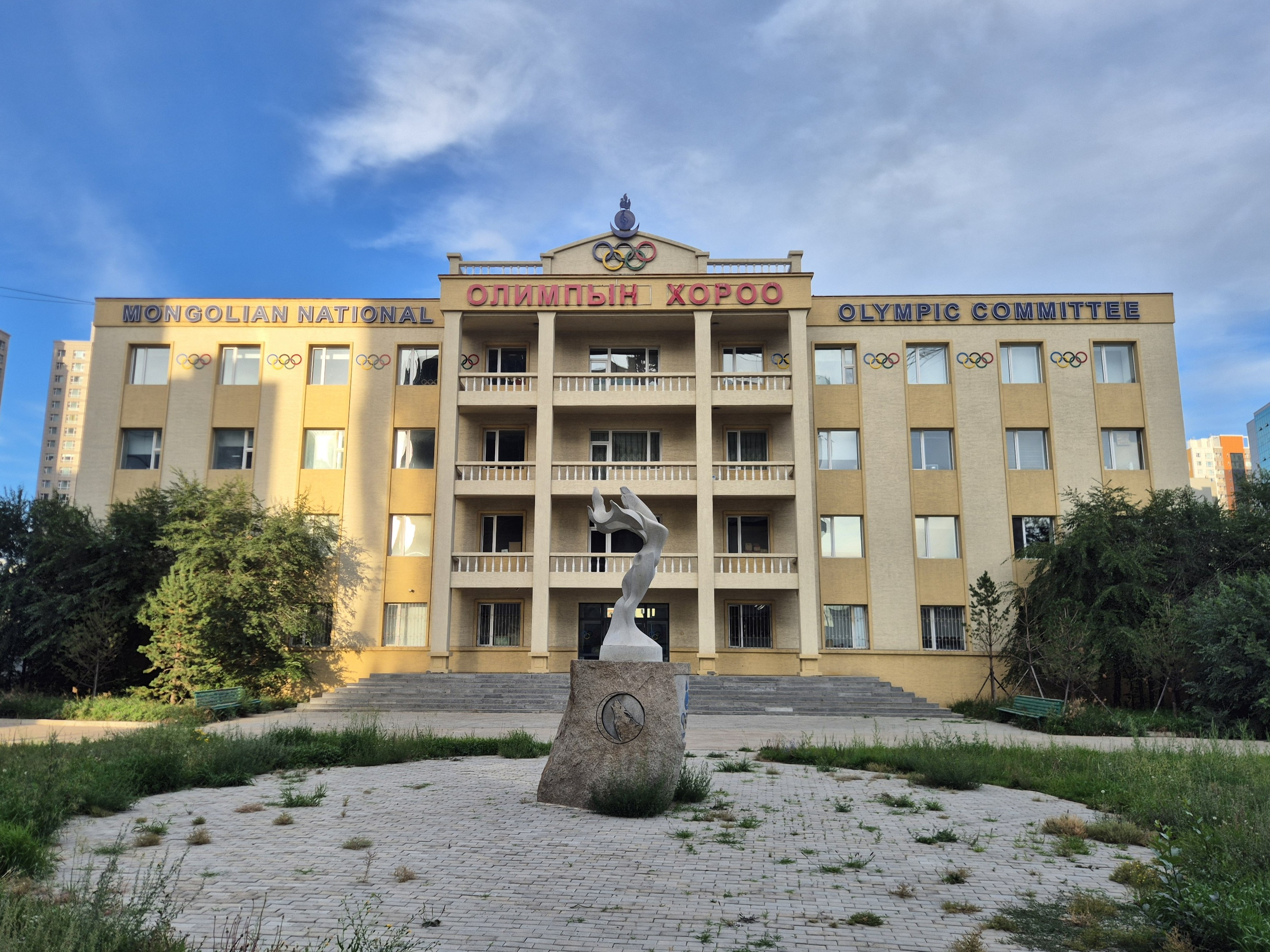
Office in Ulaanbaatar

Initially, national sports associations were established to promote development and participation by youth and adults. These then evolved to focus on participation in international sports. Mongolian athletes have been involved in regular games in Asia since 1972 and have participated in 13 Winter Olympic Games and 12 Summer Olympic Games.

== Library ==
The library contains books, magazine, and texts from ancient to modern times. Topics covered range from scientific reports, to sport and athlete histories. Over 10-thousand publications compose a rich library. As well, the Rings Newspaper is kept stocked.
