= Johan Garpenlöv =

Swedish ice hockey player (born 1968)

- Born: 21 March 1968 (age 58) Stockholm, Sweden
- Height: 6 ft 0 in (183 cm)
- Weight: 185 lb (84 kg; 13 st 3 lb)
- Position: Left wing
- Shot: Left
- Played for: Djurgårdens IF; Detroit Red Wings; San Jose Sharks; Florida Panthers; Atlanta Thrashers
- National team: Sweden
- NHL draft: 85th overall, 1986; Detroit Red Wings
- Playing career: 1988–2001

Johan Kjell Garpenlöv (born 21 March 1968) is a Swedish former ice hockey left winger and ice hockey coach. He also starred for several years in his native Sweden. He was drafted in the fifth round, 85th overall, by the Detroit Red Wings in the 1986 NHL entry draft.

== Career ==
Born in Stockholm, Garpenlöv played with Nacka HK in the second division early in his career. He next played with Djurgårdens IF of Elitserien. He played on the Sweden men's national junior ice hockey team, competing at the European Junior Championships in 1985 and 1986, and at the IIHF World U20 Championships in 1987 and 1988, winning the bronze medal at the 1987 tournament. He also competed at the 1990 World Championships, where Sweden won a silver medal.

Garpenlöv next joined the NHL, debuting with the Detroit Red Wings in the 1990–91 season. He scored 40 points as a rookie, including a four-goal game against the St. Louis Blues on 23 November 1990. After the NHL season, he scored four goals at the 1991 Men's Ice Hockey World Championships, where Sweden won the gold medal.

During the 1991–92 season, Garpenlöv was traded to the San Jose Sharks. Following the season, Garpenlöv was a member of Sweden's World Championship team for the second consecutive year. Garpenlöv scored 22 goals for the Sharks in the 1992–93 season. He played on a line with Sergei Makarov and Igor Larionov in the 1993–94 NHL season.

In March 1995, Garpenlöv was traded to the Florida Panthers for future considerations. He scored a personal best 23 goals in the 1995–96 season, but was injured over much of the next three seasons. In the 1999 NHL Expansion Draft, he was claimed by the Atlanta Thrashers and was a member of the club for its inaugural season in 1999–2000.

Garpenlöv left the NHL prior to the start of the 2000–01 season and returned to Sweden to play for Djurgården.

From the 2019–2020 season, he replaced Rikard Grönborg as head coach for the Sweden national team. On 28 October 2021, he announced he would leave that position following the 2021–2022 season.

In November 2022, Garpenlöv became head coach of Djurgårdens IF, replacing Joakim Fagervall.

== Career statistics ==
=== Regular season and playoffs ===
			Regular season					Playoffs
Season	Team	League	GP	G	A	Pts	PIM	GP	G	A	Pts	PIM
1984–85	Nacka HK	SWE.2	4	1	2	3	2	—	—	—	—	—
1985–86	Nacka HK	SWE.2	20	8	12	20	22	—	—	—	—	—
1986–87	Djurgårdens IF	SEL	29	5	8	13	22	2	0	0	0	0
1987–88	Djurgårdens IF	SEL	30	7	10	17	12	3	1	3	4	4
1988–89	Djurgårdens IF	SEL	36	12	19	31	20	8	3	4	7	10
1989–90	Djurgårdens IF	SEL	39	20	13	33	35	8	2	4	6	4
1990–91	Detroit Red Wings	NHL	71	18	22	40	18	6	0	1	1	4
1991–92	Detroit Red Wings	NHL	16	1	1	2	4	—	—	—	—	—
1991–92	Adirondack Red Wings	AHL	9	3	3	6	6	—	—	—	—	—
1991–92	San Jose Sharks	NHL	12	5	6	11	4	—	—	—	—	—
1992–93	San Jose Sharks	NHL	79	22	44	66	58	—	—	—	—	—
1993–94	San Jose Sharks	NHL	80	18	35	53	28	14	4	6	10	6
1994–95	San Jose Sharks	NHL	13	1	1	2	2	—	—	—	—	—
1994–95	Florida Panthers	NHL	27	3	9	12	0	—	—	—	—	—
1995–96	Florida Panthers	NHL	82	23	28	51	36	20	4	2	6	8
1996–97	Florida Panthers	NHL	53	11	25	36	47	4	2	0	2	4
1997–98	Florida Panthers	NHL	39	2	3	5	8	—	—	—	—	—
1998–99	Florida Panthers	NHL	64	8	9	17	42	—	—	—	—	—
1999–00	Atlanta Thrashers	NHL	73	2	14	16	31	—	—	—	—	—
2000–01	Djurgårdens IF	SEL	29	8	7	15	80	—	—	—	—	—
SEL totals			163	52	57	109	169	21	6	11	17	18
NHL totals			609	114	197	311	278	44	10	9	19	22

=== International ===
Year	Team	Event	GP	G	A	Pts	PIM
1985	Sweden	EJC	5	1	0	1	0
1986	Sweden	EJC	5	5	2	7	12
1987	Sweden	WJC	7	2	3	5	6
1988	Sweden	WJC	7	6	1	7	12
1990	Sweden	WC	10	4	4	8	4
1991	Sweden	WC	10	4	0	4	6
1991	Sweden	CC	6	0	1	1	10
1992	Sweden	WC	8	1	1	2	10
1996	Sweden	WCH	4	1	1	2	2
Junior totals			24	14	6	20	30
Senior totals			38	10	7	17	32
