= 2028 World Cup of Hockey =

International ice hockey tournament

Coupe du monde de hockey 2028 Světový pohár v ledním hokeji 2028

Tournament details
- Host countries: Canada; Czechia
- Venues: 3 (in 3 host cities)
- Dates: February 2028
- Teams: 8

The 2028 World Cup of Hockey will be the fourth installment of the World Cup of Hockey by the National Hockey League. It will be played in February 2028 with 17 games in three host cities. The competition will include eight teams from individual countries in North America and Europe.

== Background ==
The previous edition of the World Cup of Hockey was held in 2016, and was the last international ice hockey tournament until 2025 to feature full rosters of National Hockey League players. On February 2, 2024, at a press conference before the 2024 NHL All-Star Game, NHL commissioner Gary Bettman announced that the NHL and NHL Players' Association had reached an agreement to release NHL players for the 2026 and 2030 Olympic Games, as well as bring back the World Cup of Hockey in 2028 and 2032, following an 8-year hiatus on NHL participation in international competitions.

In order to promote the return of NHL players to the international stage, the league organized the 4 Nations Face-Off which was played in February 2025 between Canada, Finland, Sweden, and the United States.

The 2028 World Cup of Hockey will be the 16th "best-on-best" international tournament to include NHL players. (Note: Not including the 1972 Summit Series.) Canada are the defending World Cup of Hockey champions having won the 2016 title, while the United States are the most recent "best-on-best" international champions following their gold medal victory at the 2026 Winter Olympics.

== Host selection ==
Location of the host cities in Canada.
Location of the host city in Czechia.

The NHL had initially announced that the tournament would be played at two venues; one in North America and another in Europe, but had yet to confirm the exact host cities and arenas. On December 9, 2025, the NHL revealed that they had narrowed down the list of potential host cities to 16, with 10 cities bidding for hosting rights in North America, and another 6 cities in Europe. On March 16, 2026, it was announced that Calgary and Edmonton in Canada, and Prague in Czechia will be the host cities. Calgary and Prague will each host six round-robin and one elimination game, while the two semifinal games and the championship game will be held in Edmonton.

It will be the first time since 1987 that Alberta hosted Canada Cup or World Cup of Hockey games, and the first time since 2004 that World Cup of Hockey games were played in Prague.

== Venues ==
Scotia Place, Calgary and O2 Arena, Prague will each host a round robin group and one knockout stage game. The semifinals and final will be hosted in Rogers Place, Edmonton.

City	Stadium	Capacity	Image
(Canada) Calgary	Scotia Place	18,400	
(Canada) Edmonton	Rogers Place	18,347	
(Czech Republic) Prague	O2 Arena	17,383	

== Teams ==
The NHL has not announced which teams will be participating, although they have confirmed that all eight teams will be representing individual countries unlike the previous tournament which included Team Europe and Team North America. Canada and Czechia were essentially confirmed as participants when they were announced as the host countries on March 16, 2026. It is presumed that Finland, Sweden, and the United States will also participate, due to their involvement with the 4 Nations Face-Off tournament in 2025.

The NHL announced that they were negotiating with the IIHF to ensure that players from outside the NHL can be made available for the tournament, as the non-Big Six teams may otherwise struggle to produce a full roster of NHL players for the tournament.

Russia's participation remains uncertain as they were under an IIHF suspension due to the Russo-Ukrainian war, and although the NHL is not obligated to enforce this suspension at the World Cup of Hockey, the league had excluded them from the 4 Nations Face-Off and had announced that they will "continue to monitor world events before a decision is made". On March 18, 2026, NHL deputy commissioner Bill Daly announced that Russia were not likely to be included if the Russo-Ukrainian war was ongoing in 2028. The NHL is also concerned that Russian participation would potentially jeopardize the entire event, as the hockey federations of Czechia, Finland, and Sweden allegedly informed the NHL that they would boycott the tournament if Russia was included. On October 30, 2026, the Court of Arbitration for Sport ruled that the IIHF must reinstate Russia to all international competitions, although as the tournament is not organized by the IIHF, the NHL is not bound by the ruling. While the NHL released a statement suggesting that a decision on Russian inclusion was still pending despite the CAS ruling, the government of Canada announced that members of an ice hockey delegation representing Russia would not be granted visas for any international tournaments hosted on Canadian soil unless the war in Ukraine was ended.

Confirmed teams
Team	Previous appearances	Best result
Host teams
Canada	3 (1996, 2004, 2016)	Champions (2004, 2016)
Czechia	3 (1996, 2004, 2016)	3rd place (2004)
Other 4 Nations Face-Off participants
Finland	3 (1996, 2004, 2016)	Runners-up (2004)
Sweden	3 (1996, 2004, 2016)	3rd place (1996, 2016)
United States	3 (1996, 2004, 2016)	Champions (1996)

Potential teams
Team	Previous appearances	Best result
Previous participants
Germany	2 (1996, 2004)	6th place (1996)
Russia (Note: Eligibility still unclear due to boycotts and sanctions of Russian athletics following the Russian invasion of Ukraine.)	3 (1996, 2004, 2016)	4th place (1996, 2016)
Slovakia	2 (1996, 2004)	7th place (1996, 2004)
Potential debuts
Switzerland	0	None

== Group stage ==
=== North American pool (Calgary) ===
Pos	Team	GP	W	OTW	OTL	L	GF	GA	GD	Pts	Qualification
1	Canada (H)	0	0	0	0	0	0	0	0	0	Advance to semifinals
2	TBA	0	0	0	0	0	0	0	0	0	Advance to quarterfinals
3	TBA	0	0	0	0	0	0	0	0	0	Advance to quarterfinals
4	TBA	0	0	0	0	0	0	0	0	0	

First games will be played: February 2028. Source:
(H) Host

February 2028	v	Scotia Place, Calgary

February 2028	v	Scotia Place, Calgary

February 2028	v	Scotia Place, Calgary

February 2028	v	Scotia Place, Calgary

February 2028	v	Scotia Place, Calgary

February 2028	v	Scotia Place, Calgary

=== European pool (Prague) ===
Pos	Team	GP	W	OTW	OTL	L	GF	GA	GD	Pts	Qualification
1	Czechia (H)	0	0	0	0	0	0	0	0	0	Advance to semifinals
2	TBA	0	0	0	0	0	0	0	0	0	Advance to quarterfinals
3	TBA	0	0	0	0	0	0	0	0	0	Advance to quarterfinals
4	TBA	0	0	0	0	0	0	0	0	0	

First games will be played: February 2028. Source:
(H) Host

February 2028	v	O2 Arena, Prague

February 2028	v	O2 Arena, Prague

February 2028	v	O2 Arena, Prague

February 2028	v	O2 Arena, Prague

February 2028	v	O2 Arena, Prague

February 2028	v	O2 Arena, Prague

== Knockout stage ==
=== Bracket ===
Quarterfinals
February – Calgary
February – Prague

Semifinals
February – Edmonton
February – Edmonton

Final
February – Edmonton

=== Quarterfinals ===
February 2028	v	Scotia Place, Calgary

February 2028	v	O2 Arena, Prague

=== Semifinals ===
February 2028	v	Rogers Place, Edmonton

February 2028	v	Rogers Place, Edmonton

=== Final ===
February 2028	v	Rogers Place, Edmonton

== Broadcasting ==
In March 2026, NHL commissioner Gary Bettman stated that they will open the bidding for the broadcasting rights instead of automatically awarding them to the league's current media partners in Canada, Europe, and the United States.

== See also ==
- List of international ice hockey competitions featuring NHL players
