= Big Six (ice hockey) =

Traditionally-strongest men's ice hockey nations

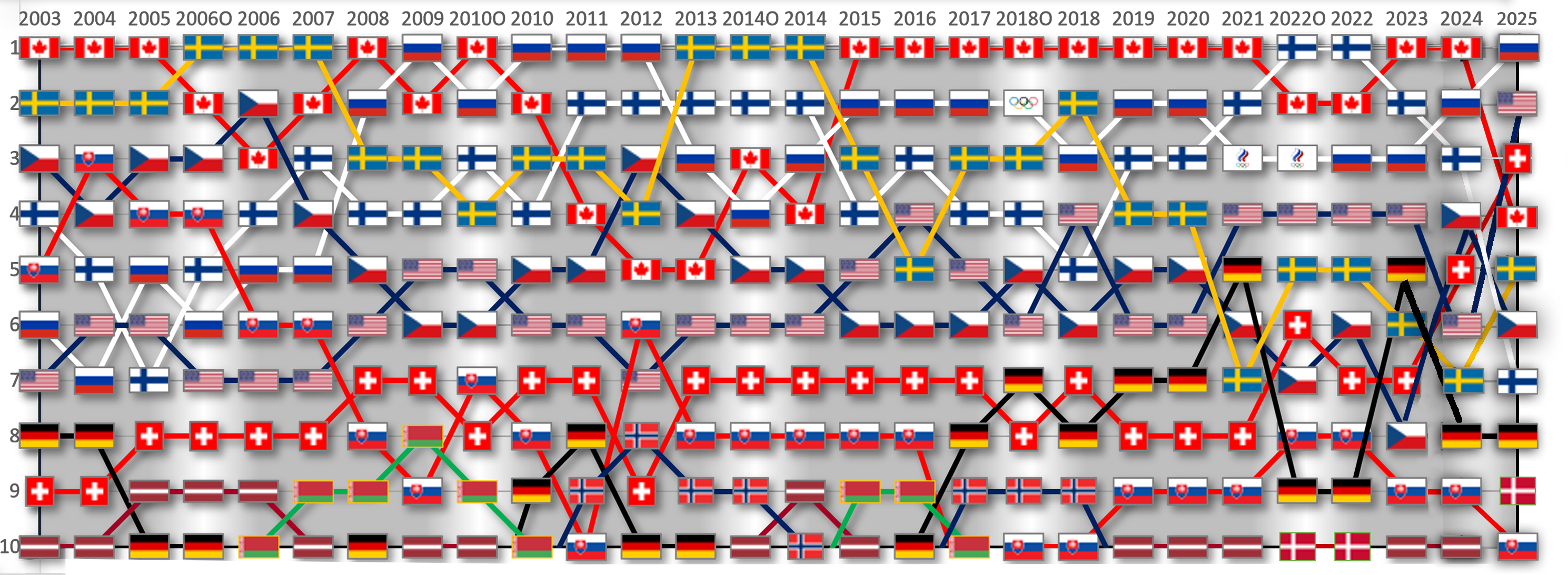
The IIHF World Ranking depicts the prominence of the Big Six

In men's international ice hockey, the Big Six is a group comprising the six national teams that have dominated play throughout the history of international ice hockey, especially since the 1950s. It has traditionally been composed of the North American countries of Canada and the United States and four European countries: Czechia, Finland, Russia, and Sweden. During the Cold War and for two years afterwards, the Soviet Union/CIS and Czechoslovakia held the places of Russia and Czechia, respectively, within the group. The four European members are sometimes referred to as the "European Big Four" or "Big Four", especially to distinguish them from the North American teams.

As of 2026, out of the 267 Ice Hockey World Championships medals awarded by the International Ice Hockey Federation (IIHF), 235 have been won by the Big Six teams. Since 1954, only twelve medals have been won by teams outside the Big Six (five by Switzerland, four by Slovakia, and one each by Germany, Latvia and Norway). Of the 78 Olympic ice hockey medals awarded, 70 have been won by a Big Six team.

== Results ==
=== Olympic Men's Ice Hockey Tournament ===
The Olympic Games were originally intended for amateur athletes. However, the advent of the state-sponsored "full-time amateur athlete" of the Eastern Bloc countries further eroded the ideology of the pure amateur, as it put the self-financed amateurs of the Western countries at a disadvantage. The Soviet Union entered teams of athletes who were all nominally students, soldiers, or working in a profession, but many of whom were in reality paid by the state to train on a full-time basis. In 1986, the International Olympic Committee (IOC) voted to allow professional athletes to compete in the Olympic Games starting in 1988. The National Hockey League (NHL) was initially reluctant to allow its players to compete because the Olympics are held in the middle of the NHL season, and the league would have to halt play if many of its players participated. Eventually, NHL players were admitted starting in 1998. However, the NHL again refused to release its players in 2018, citing financial reasons. On September 3, 2021, NHL announced that its players would return to the Olympics and participate in the 2022 tournament. Later, in December 2021, the NHL and NHL Players' Association withdrew from the 2022 Winter Olympics due to the COVID-19 pandemic surge. The league will participate in the 2026 and 2030 Winter Olympics after an agreement was reached in 2024.

| Year | Canada | Czechoslovakia/ Czechia | Finland | Soviet Union/ CIS/ Russia | Sweden | United States |
|---|---|---|---|---|---|---|
| 1920 | 1 | 3 | – | – | 4 | 2 |
| 1924 | 1 | 5 | – | – | 4 | 2 |
| 1928 | 1 | 5 | – | – | 2 | – |
| 1932 | 1 | – | – | – | – | 2 |
| 1936 | 2 | 4 | – | – | 5 | 3 |
| 1948 | 1 | 2 | – | – | 4 | 4, DQ |
| 1952 | 1 | 4 | 7 | – | 3 | 2 |
| 1956 | 3 | 5 | – | 1 | 4 | 2 |
| 1960 | 2 | 4 | 7 | 3 | 5 | 1 |
| 1964 | 4 | 3 | 6 | 1 | 2 | 5 |
| 1968 | 3 | 2 | 5 | 1 | 4 | 6 |
| 1972 | – | 3 | 5 | 1 | 4 | 2 |
| 1976 | – | 2 | 4 | 1 | – | 5 |
| 1980 | 6 | 5 | 4 | 2 | 3 | 1 |
| 1984 | 4 | 2 | 6 | 1 | 3 | 7 |
| 1988 | 4 | 6 | 2 | 1 | 3 | 7 |
| 1992 | 2 | 3 | 7 | 1 (Note: The CIS team participated at the 1992 Winter Olympics as part of the Unified Team.) | 5 | 4 |
| 1994 | 2 | 5 | 3 | 4 | 1 | 8 |
| 1998 | 4 | 1 | 3 | 2 | 5 | 6 |
| 2002 | 1 | 7 | 6 | 3 | 5 | 2 |
| 2006 | 7 | 3 | 2 | 4 | 1 | 8 |
| 2010 | 1 | 7 | 3 | 6 | 5 | 2 |
| 2014 | 1 | 6 | 3 | 5 | 2 | 4 |
| 2018 | 3 | 4 | 6 | 1 (Note: The Russian Olympic Committee was disqualified due to the Russian doping scandal. However, the Russian national team was allowed to play in the tournament under the Olympic flag and the moniker Olympic Athletes from Russia.) | 5 | 7 |
| 2022 | 6 | 9 | 1 | 2 (Note: The Russian Olympic Committee was disqualified due to the Russian doping scandal. However, the Russian national team was allowed to play in the tournament under the Russian Olympic Committee flag and the moniker Russian Olympic Committee.) | 4 | 5 |
| 2026 | 2 | 8 | 3 | – | 7 | 1 |

=== IIHF Men's World Championships ===
Winners of the Ice Hockey World Championships with the number of titles by country. (Note: Note that medals won by the Soviet Union or CIS are credited to Russia, the official successor state of the USSR, and those of Czechoslovakia are counted for the Czech Republic, Czechoslovakia's successor state per the IIHF.) 1 2–4 5–9 10–24 25+

| Nation | 93 | 94 | 95 | 96 | 97 | 98 | 99 | 00 | 01 | 02 | 03 | 04 | 05 | 06 | 07 | 08 | 09 | 10 | 11 | 12 | 13 | 14 | 15 | 16 | 17 | 18 | 19 | 21 | 22 | 23 | 24 | 25 | 26 |
|---|---|---|---|---|---|---|---|---|---|---|---|---|---|---|---|---|---|---|---|---|---|---|---|---|---|---|---|---|---|---|---|---|---|
| Canada | 4 | 1 | 3 | 2 | 1 | 6 | 4 | 4 | 5 | 6 | 1 | 1 | 2 | 4 | 1 | 2 | 2 | 7 | 5 | 5 | 5 | 5 | 1 | 1 | 2 | 4 | 2 | 1 | 2 | 1 | 4 | 5 | 4 |
| Czechia | 3 | 7 | 4 | 1 | 3 | 3 | 1 | 1 | 1 | 5 | 4 | 5 | 1 | 2 | 7 | 5 | 6 | 1 | 3 | 3 | 7 | 4 | 4 | 5 | 7 | 7 | 4 | 7 | 3 | 8 | 1 | 6 | 5 |
| Finland | 7 | 2 | 1 | 5 | 5 | 2 | 2 | 3 | 2 | 4 | 5 | 6 | 7 | 3 | 2 | 3 | 5 | 6 | 1 | 4 | 4 | 2 | 6 | 2 | 4 | 5 | 1 | 2 | 1 | 7 | 8 | 7 | 1 |
| Russia | 1 | 5 | 5 | 4 | 4 | 5 | 5 | 11 | 6 | 2 | 7 | 10 | 3 | 5 | 3 | 1 | 1 | 2 | 4 | 1 | 6 | 1 | 2 | 3 | 3 | 6 | 3 | 5 (Note: The Russian Olympic Committee was disqualified due to the Russian doping scandal. However, the Russian national team was allowed to play in the tournament under the Russian Olympic Committee flag and the moniker Russian Olympic Committee.) | – | – | – | – | – |
| Sweden | 2 | 3 | 2 | 6 | 2 | 1 | 3 | 7 | 3 | 3 | 2 | 2 | 4 | 1 | 4 | 4 | 3 | 3 | 2 | 6 | 1 | 3 | 5 | 6 | 1 | 1 | 5 | 9 | 6 | 6 | 3 | 3 | 7 |
| United States | 6 | 4 | 6 | 3 | 6 | 12 | 6 | 5 | 4 | 7 | 13 | 3 | 6 | 7 | 5 | 6 | 4 | 13 | 8 | 7 | 3 | 6 | 3 | 4 | 5 | 3 | 7 | 3 | 4 | 4 | 5 | 1 | 8 |

- Only the tournaments since the formation of the modern Czech Republic team are shown above.
- The 2020 tournament was cancelled due to the COVID-19 pandemic.

=== Canada Cup/World Cup of Hockey ===
The Canada Cup served as an ice hockey world championship that was governed by National Hockey League (NHL) rules rather than IIHF rules, and was open to professionals so that NHL players could participate. The 1976 Canada Cup was, therefore, the first time that the best players from the leading ice hockey countries were able to face each other. The tournament was held five times between 1976 and 1991. Only one team outside of the Big Six, West Germany, was ever allowed to compete in the Canada Cup; this occurred in 1984 when West Germany replaced Finland because it had finished higher in the IIHF World Championship.

The World Cup of Hockey replaced the Canada Cup in 1996. It has been held three times so far (1996, 2004, and 2016), with plans to be held every four years beginning in 2028. Eight teams compete at the World Cup: Germany and Slovakia participated in the first two editions, whereas Team Europe, made up of European players whose countries did not have their own team in the event and Team North America, composed of players 23 years old and younger from Canada and the United States, played in 2016.

==== Canada Cup ====
| Year | Canada | Czechoslovakia | Finland | Soviet Union | Sweden | United States |
|---|---|---|---|---|---|---|
| 1976 | 1 | 2 | 6 | 3 | 4 | 5 |
| 1981 | 2 | 3 | 6 | 1 | 5 | 4 |
| 1984 | 1 | 5 | – | 3 | 2 | 4 |
| 1987 | 1 | 4 | 6 | 2 | 3 | 5 |
| 1991 | 1 | 6 | 3 | 5 | 4 | 2 |

==== World Cup of Hockey ====
| Year | Canada | Czech Republic | Finland | Russia | Sweden | United States |
|---|---|---|---|---|---|---|
| 1996 | 2 | 8 | 5 | 4 | 3 | 1 |
| 2004 | 1 | 3 | 2 | 6 | 5 | 4 |
| 2016 (Note: Note that the rankings include the final ranking of two non-national teams that participated in the tournament: Team North America and Team Europe. Were these teams not to be factored in to the final ranking, Sweden would have placed 2nd, Russia 3rd, the Czech Republic 4th, the United States 5th, and Finland 6th.) | 1 | 6 | 8 | 4 | 3 | 7 |

=== Summary ===
As of 2026 IIHF World Championship tournament

Wins by tournament
| Tournament | Canada | Czechoslovakia/ Czechia | Finland | Soviet Union/ CIS/ Russia | Sweden | United States | Total |
|---|---|---|---|---|---|---|---|
| Olympic tournaments | 9 | 1 | 1 | 9 | 2 | 3 | 25/26 (Note: Won by Great Britain in 1936.) |
| IIHF World Championships (Note: Excludes Olympic tournaments which counted as IIHF World Championships to avoid double counting.) | 22 | 13 | 5 | 24 | 11 | 2 | 77/78 (Note: Won by Slovakia in 2002.) |
| Canada Cup/ World Cup of Hockey | 6 | 0 | 0 | 1 | 0 | 1 | 8/8 |
| Total | 37 | 14 | 6 | 34 | 13 | 6 | 110/112 |
