= List of international ice hockey competitions featuring NHL players =

The following is a list of international ice hockey competitions where National Hockey League (NHL) players have participated. Most of these competitions were arranged either by the NHL or its union, the NHLPA, or the International Olympic Committee and the International Ice Hockey Federation. There have been 15 full international tournaments where it was possible for all NHL players to participate since the 1976 Canada Cup, dubbed as the first real World Championship. There are 5 Canada Cups, 3 World Cups of Hockey, 6 Winter Olympics and 1 Four Nations Face-Off tournament.

Canada has won 10 of these tournaments (4 Canada Cups, 3 Winter Olympic Gold Medals, 2 World Cups of Hockey and 1 Four Nations Face-Off), the US has won 2 (2026 Olympic Gold Medal, 1996 World Cup of Hockey), Czechia has won 1 (1998 Olympic Gold Medal), Sweden has won 1 (2006 Olympic Gold Medal), and the Soviet Union has won 1 (1981 Canada Cup).

== National team competitions ==
=== NHL-organized tournaments ===
==== Summit Series ====
The Summit Series was an eight-game challenge series between the Soviet National Team and the Canadian National Team (composed of NHL players for the first time).

In the 1972 Summit Series, the Canadian team was made up of NHL ice hockey players. No World Hockey Association players were included in the event. Two years later, Canadian WHA players competed in the 1974 Summit Series. No active NHL players participated in the series; there were, however, some former and future NHLers that played for the WHA-composed Canadian team in the series.

Year	Winner	Runner-up
1972	Canada	Soviet Union

==== Canada Cup ====
The Canada Cup tournament was a major international invitational competition that included NHL players before the advent of the World Cup of Hockey.

Year	Winner	Runner-up
1976	Canada	Czechoslovakia
1981	Soviet Union	Canada
1984	Canada	Sweden
1987	Canada	Soviet Union
1991	Canada	United States

==== World Cup ====
In 1996, the World Cup of Hockey replaced the Canada Cup.

Year	Winner	Runner-up
1996	United States	Canada
2004	Canada	Finland
2016	Canada	Europe
2028	Future event	
2032	Future event	

==== 4 Nations Face-Off tournament ====
In 2025, the NHL hosted a one-off 4 Nations Face-Off tournament in lieu of a typical NHL All-Star event. A total of seven games were played from February 12–20, with games being hosted in Montreal at Bell Centre, and in Boston at TD Garden. The countries participating in the tournament were Canada, Finland, Sweden and the United States, and each team's roster was composed entirely of NHL players, similar to the World Cup of Hockey (although non-NHL players also participate in the latter).

Year	Winner	Runner-up
2025	Canada	United States

=== IIHF-organized tournaments ===
==== Olympics ====
Between 1998 and 2014, the NHL had a break in the season to allow its players to participate in the Olympics. In 2024, the NHL, along with the National Hockey League Players' Association and the International Ice Hockey Federation, have reached an agreement to once again release players to participate in the 2026 and 2030 Olympic Games after missing out in 2018 and 2022.

Year	City	Gold	Silver	Bronze
1998	(Japan) Nagano	Czech Republic	Russia	Finland
2002	(United States) Salt Lake City	Canada	United States	Russia
2006	(Italy) Turin	Sweden	Finland	Czech Republic
2010	(Canada) Vancouver	Canada	United States	Finland
2014	(Russia) Sochi	Canada	Sweden	Finland
2026	(Italy) Milan / Cortina	United States	Canada	Finland
2030	(France) French Alps	Future event		

==== IIHF World Championships ====
Since 1976, there has been no limit to how many NHL players countries can send to the IIHF World Championships, but the tournament is usually played during the NHL playoffs. Because of the NHL lockout in 2004–05, all NHL players were available to participate in the 2005 Championship. However, many players did not participate because they had not played for a full season, and were therefore not in "game shape".

IIHF Championships without restrictions on NHL players
Year	Host	Gold	Silver	Bronze
2005	Austria	Czech Republic	Canada	Russia

=== List of medals by country ===
This is a list of national teams that have won one or more medals in international competitions that included NHL players. As not all NHL players are eligible for the annual IIHF World Championships, those titles are not included in this table, except the 2005 IIHF World Championship, as all NHL players were permitted to play that year due to the 2004–05 NHL lockout.

Best-on-best medals
Country	Gold	Silver	Bronze	Total
Canada	10 (Note: Does not include the 1972 Summit Series victory as no gold medals or trophy was awarded.)	2 (Note: No silver medals awarded at the 1981 Canada Cup and 1996 World Cup of Hockey.)	–	12
United States	2	2 (Note: No silver medals awarded at the 1991 Canada Cup and 2025 4 Nations Face-Off.)	–	4
Czech Republic	2	– (Note: No silver medals awarded at the 1976 Canada Cup.)	1	3
Soviet Union / Russia	1	1 (Note: No silver medals awarded at the 1972 Summit Series and 1987 Canada Cup.)	2 (Note: No bronze medals awarded at the 1976 Canada Cup.)	4
Sweden	1	1 (Note: No silver medals awarded at the 1984 Canada Cup.)	–	2
Finland	0	1 (Note: No silver medals awarded at the 2004 World Cup of Hockey.)	4 (Note: No bronze medals awarded at the 2025 4 Nations Face-Off.)	5

=== List of titles by country ===
This is a list of national teams that have won one or more championships in international competitions that included NHL players. As not all NHL players are eligible for the annual IIHF World Championships, those titles are not included in this table. This table also excludes the 1974 Summit Series as the teams were not composed of current NHL players.

Best-on-best titles
Country	Total	OLY	WC	CC	Other
Canada	11	3	2	4	2 (Note: Includes the 1972 Summit Series and 2025 4 Nations Face-Off.)
United States	2	1	1	–	–
Czech Republic	2	1	–	–	1 (Note: Includes the 2005 IIHF World Championship, as all NHL players were permitted to play due to the 2004–05 NHL lockout.)
Soviet Union	1	–	–	1	–
Sweden	1	1	–	–	–

== Other competitions ==
=== Super Series ===
The Super Series were exhibition games between Soviet teams and NHL teams that took place on each NHL opponents' home ice in North America from 1976 to 1991. The Soviet teams were usually club teams from the Soviet hockey league, primarily HC CSKA Moscow enhanced by other Russian all-stars. The exception was in 1983, when the Soviet National Team represented the Soviet Union. Soviet teams won 14 series, NHL teams won 2 series, and 2 series were tied.

In the following summary the winner of a series is in bold.

Year	1st Team	2nd Team	W	L	T
1976	**CSKA Moscow**	NHL	2	1	1
1976	**Soviet Wings Moscow**	NHL	3	1	0
1978	**Spartak Moscow**	NHL	3	2	0
1979	**Soviet Wings Moscow**	NHL	2	1	1
1980	**Dynamo Moscow**	NHL	2	1	1
1980	**CSKA Moscow**	NHL	3	2	0
1983	**Soviet Union**	NHL	4	2	0
1986	**CSKA Moscow**	NHL	5	1	0
1986	**Dynamo Moscow**	NHL	2	1	1
1989	**CSKA Moscow**	NHL	4	2	1
1989	**NHL**	Dinamo Riga	4	2	1
1990	NHL	Khimik Voskresensk	3	3	0
1990	**NHL**	Soviet Wings Moscow	3	1	1
1990	**CSKA Moscow**	NHL	4	1	0
1990	**Dynamo Moscow**	NHL	3	2	0
1991	NHL	Khimik Voskresensk	3	3	1
1991	**CSKA Moscow**	NHL	6	1	0
1991	**Dynamo Moscow**	NHL	3	2	2

=== Challenge Cup 1979 ===
Year	Winner	Runner-up
1979	Soviet Union	NHL All-Stars

=== Rendez-vous '87 ===
In 1987, two matches were held between the USSR and NHL All Stars in Quebec City, Canada in place of the annual NHL All Star Game. Each team won one game and the series was declared a tie.

Game	Date	Winner	Runner-up	Score
**1st**	11 February 1987	NHL All-Stars	Soviet Union	4–3
**2nd**	13 February 1987	Soviet Union	NHL All-Stars	5–3

=== Ninety Nine All Stars Tour ===
During the 1994–95 NHL lockout the Ninety Nine All Stars Tour was created by Wayne Gretzky and some of his personal friends, who formed a team and toured Europe. Playing in five countries, they played eight games against mainly European competition.

=== NHL Challenge ===
Between 2000 and 2003, a select few NHL teams traveled to Europe to play exhibition games against top division teams in the Swedish and Finnish leagues.

Year	Winner	Opponent	Score
2000	Vancouver Canucks	Modo	5–2
2000	Vancouver Canucks	Djurgårdens IF	2–1
2001	Colorado Avalanche	Brynäs IF	5–3
2003	Toronto Maple Leafs	Jokerit	5–3
2003	Toronto Maple Leafs	Djurgårdens IF	9–2
2003	Toronto Maple Leafs	Färjestads BK	3–0

=== Victoria Cup ===
The Victoria Cup was an ice hockey tournament organized by the IIHF and intended for teams of the Champions Hockey League and the NHL. The inaugural Cup was a single game playoff between the 2008 IIHF European Champions Cup winners Metallurg Magnitogorsk and the New York Rangers of the NHL. It was held in Bern, Switzerland on 1 October 2008. The Rangers won 4–3.

The 2009 edition of the tournament featured the ZSC Lions, the 2008–09 Champions Hockey League winners, and the Chicago Blackhawks of the NHL. The ZSC Lions defeated the Blackhawks 2–1 in the Hallenstadion in Zurich, Switzerland.

Year	Winner	Runner-up
2008	New York Rangers	Metallurg Magnitogorsk
2009	ZSC Lions	Chicago Blackhawks

=== KHL vs NHL games ===
Teams of the former Soviet league did not play against NHL teams after the Super Series ended until 2008, when the 2008 Victoria Cup took place in Bern. In 2010, NHL teams played their first games on Russian and Latvian ice since 1990.

== See also ==
- International Ice Hockey Federation
- National Hockey League
- Ice Hockey World Championships
- Ice hockey at the Olympic Games
- List of international games played by NHL teams
