= Klockare =

Klockare is a surname. Notable people with the surname include:

- Lennart Klockare (born 1945), Swedish politician
- Stefan Klockare (born 1972), Swedish ice hockey player
