= Rikard Grönborg =

Swedish ice hockey player and coach

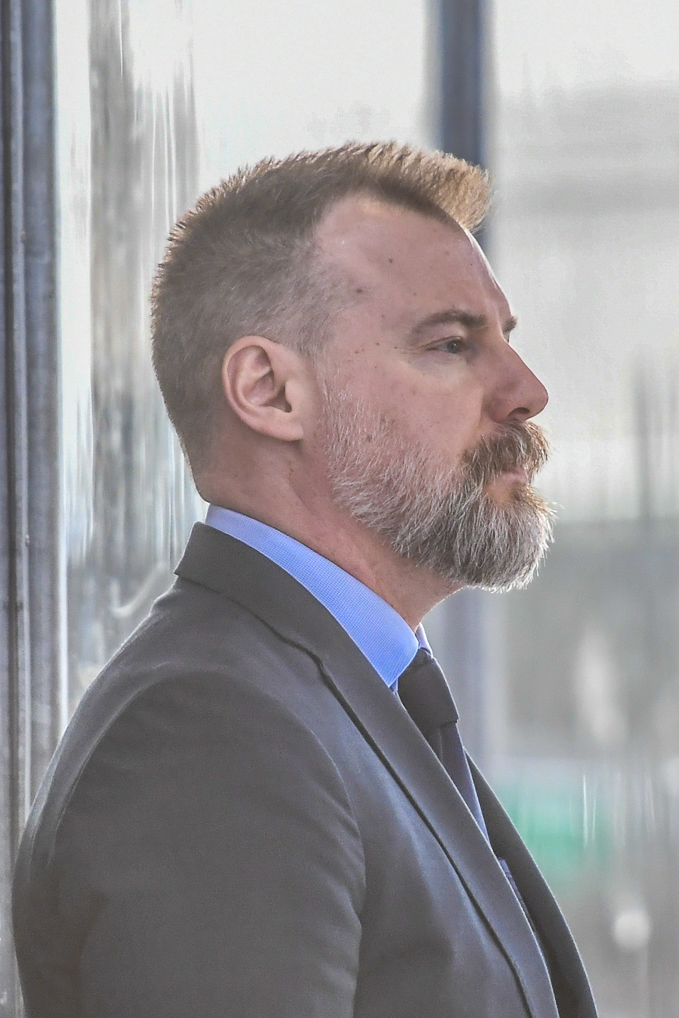
- Rickard Grönborg during an April 2017 friendly game between Austria and Sweden in Vienna, Austria
- Born: 8 June 1968 (age 57) Huddinge, Sweden
- Height: 6 ft 1 in (185 cm)
- Weight: 207 lb (94 kg; 14 st 11 lb)
- Position: Defence
- Shot: Left
- Played for: Tyringe SoSS; Hammarby
- Playing career: 1992–1994

Rikard Grönborg (born 8 June 1968) is a Swedish professional ice hockey coach and former defenceman.

Grönborg is currently the head coach of Tappara in Finnish Liiga. 2019–2022 he served as head coach of ZSC Lions of the National League. In addition, he was also formerly the coach of the Sweden men's national ice hockey team.

== Playing career ==
Grönborg played college hockey at St. Cloud State University. He returned to Sweden in 1992-93 as a member of Rögle BK but went on loan to Tyringe SoSS, playing 32 games for Tyringe. In 1993–94, Grönborg played with Hammarby IF for 36 regular season games and 5 qualification games.

== Coaching career ==
He started his coaching career in 1994 as an assistant coach at the University of Wisconsin-Stout.

He was the head coach of the Great Falls Americans of the AWHL from 1998 to 2003. He was an assistant coach with the Spokane Chiefs of the WHL in 2004–05. Then served as a scout for Sweden before taking the head coaching role at the junior and later the senior level. He was an assistant coach with Team Sweden under head coach Pär Mårts at the 2014 Winter Olympics. He was the head coach of the Swedish national team at the senior level from 2016 to 2017 through 2018-19 before leaving the national team for ZSC Lions. As the head coach of the Swedish national team, Grönborg won the 2017 and 2018 IIHF World Championships.

In 2019–20, ZSC Lions ended the season first in the league, but the season was abandoned due to the COVID-19 pandemic. In 2020–21, ZSC Lions ended the season in 5th place and made the playoffs, however they were eliminated in the semifinals by Genève-Servette. Partway through the 2022-23 NL season, Grönborg was relieved of his duties at ZSC Lions and replaced by Marc Crawford

In 2023–24, Grönborg signed a three-year contract with Tappara of the Liiga. In his first season as Tappara's head coach, the season ended with a victory in the Finnish championship finals, with Tappara lifting the Kanada-malja. Additionally Grönborg was awarded the Kalevi Numminen trophy as the best coach of the Liiga season, voted by the press.

His second season with Tappara ended in the quarter-finals as the club was knocked out of the playoffs by local rivals Ilves.
