= World Cup of Hockey =

Ice hockey tournament for men's national teams

- Upcoming season or competition: 2028 World Cup of Hockey
- Logo of 2016 event
- Sport: Ice hockey
- Founded: 1996 (replaced Canada Cup)
- First season: 1996
- Organizing body: National Hockey League
- No. of teams: 8
- Most recent champion: Canada (2nd title) (2016)
- Most titles: Canada (2 titles)

The World Cup of Hockey is an international ice hockey tournament. Inaugurated in 1996, it is the successor to the Canada Cup, which was held with six teams every three to five years, from 1976 to 1991, and was the first international hockey championship to allow nations to field their top players. The World Cup followed with three tournaments (to date), with eight-team tournaments on an irregular basis, with the United States winning in 1996 and Canada winning in 2004 and 2016. Following the 2016 tournament, after the cancellation of the 2020 tournament, it was uncertain whether the series would be continued. In 2024, it was revived, tentatively scheduled to be held every four years, starting in 2028.

The World Cup of Hockey is organized by the National Hockey League (NHL) and the National Hockey League Players' Association (NHLPA) (issues with the NHL Collective Bargaining Agreement cancelled the 2020 event), unlike the annual Ice Hockey World Championships and quadrennial Olympic tournament, both run by the International Ice Hockey Federation (IIHF). World Cup games are played under NHL rules and not those of the IIHF, and the tournament occurs prior to the NHL pre-season, allowing all the NHL's players to be available, unlike the World Championships, which overlaps with the NHL's Stanley Cup playoffs.

== History ==
=== Canada Cup ===
The World Cup of Hockey was preceded by the Canada Cup, which began in 1976 in a combined effort from Doug Fisher of Hockey Canada and Alan Eagleson of the NHL Players' Association. Taking inspiration from soccer's FIFA World Cup, Eagleson proposed a new tournament that would bring together all the top hockey–playing nations. After successful negotiations with hockey officials from the Soviet Union in September 1974, Eagleson began arranging the Canada Cup tournament, which debuted in 1976. It was the first international ice hockey tournament that allowed hockey nations to field their top players, as the Winter Olympics was nominally an amateur competition at the time and the annual World Championships clashed with the Stanley Cup playoffs.

The tournaments, held every three to five years, took place in North American venues prior to the start of the National Hockey League (NHL) regular season. Six teams competed in each edition. Of the five Canada Cup tournaments, four were won by Canada, and one by the Soviet Union in 1981.

=== World Cup of Hockey ===
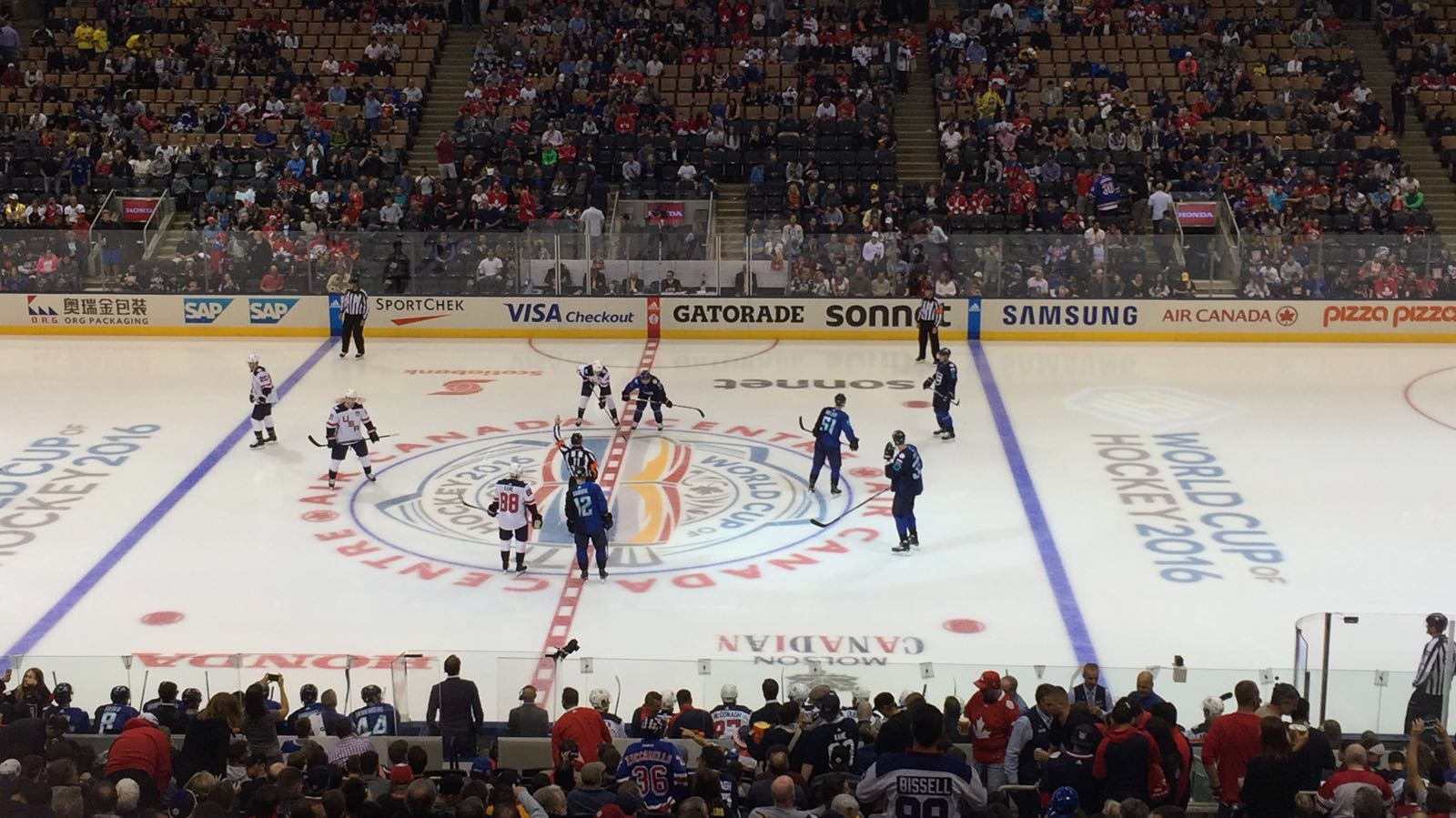
2016 World Cup of Hockey game between Europe and the United States

In 1996, the Canada Cup was officially replaced by the World Cup of Hockey. The Canada Cup trophy was retired. The tournament expanded to eight teams: as the national teams of Canada, the United States, the Czech Republic, Finland, Russia and Sweden, popularly dubbed as the Big Six, were joined by Germany and Slovakia. The United States defeated Canada in the finals to win the inaugural event.

Eight years later, the second installment of the World Cup of Hockey took place in 2004, just prior to the 2004–05 NHL lockout. Canada won its first tournament championship, defeating the Czech Republic in the semifinals and Finland in the final match.

On January 24, 2015, NHL commissioner Gary Bettman announced the 2016 World Cup of Hockey to be held in September 2016 at Air Canada Centre in Toronto. The 2016 edition featured a slightly modified format: alongside the Big Six countries, there were two all-star teams, consisting of Team Europe and an under-23 Team North America. Canada again won the championship, defeating Team Europe in the finals.

A 2020 edition was planned to include a European qualification tournament to determine some participating nations. In January 2019, plans for the tournament were abandoned due to the pending expiration of the collective bargaining agreement (CBA) between the NHL and the NHL Players' Association. In August 2019, it was reported that a World Cup could take place in February 2021 if the CBA could be extended or renewed; however, this was ruled-out by the NHL later that year.

In February 2024, the NHL announced plans to hold the next World Cup in 2028 and every four years after that. The NHL hosted the 4 Nations Face-Off in lieu of a World Cup in February 2025. On February 12, 2025, the NHL again announced that the tournament would return in February 2028, launching a commitment to send NHL players to the 2030 Winter Olympics. It was mentioned that the Olympics and World Cup are going to rotate every two years starting with the 2026 Winter Olympics and the teams will be solicited by the league and the NHLPA.

== Trophy ==
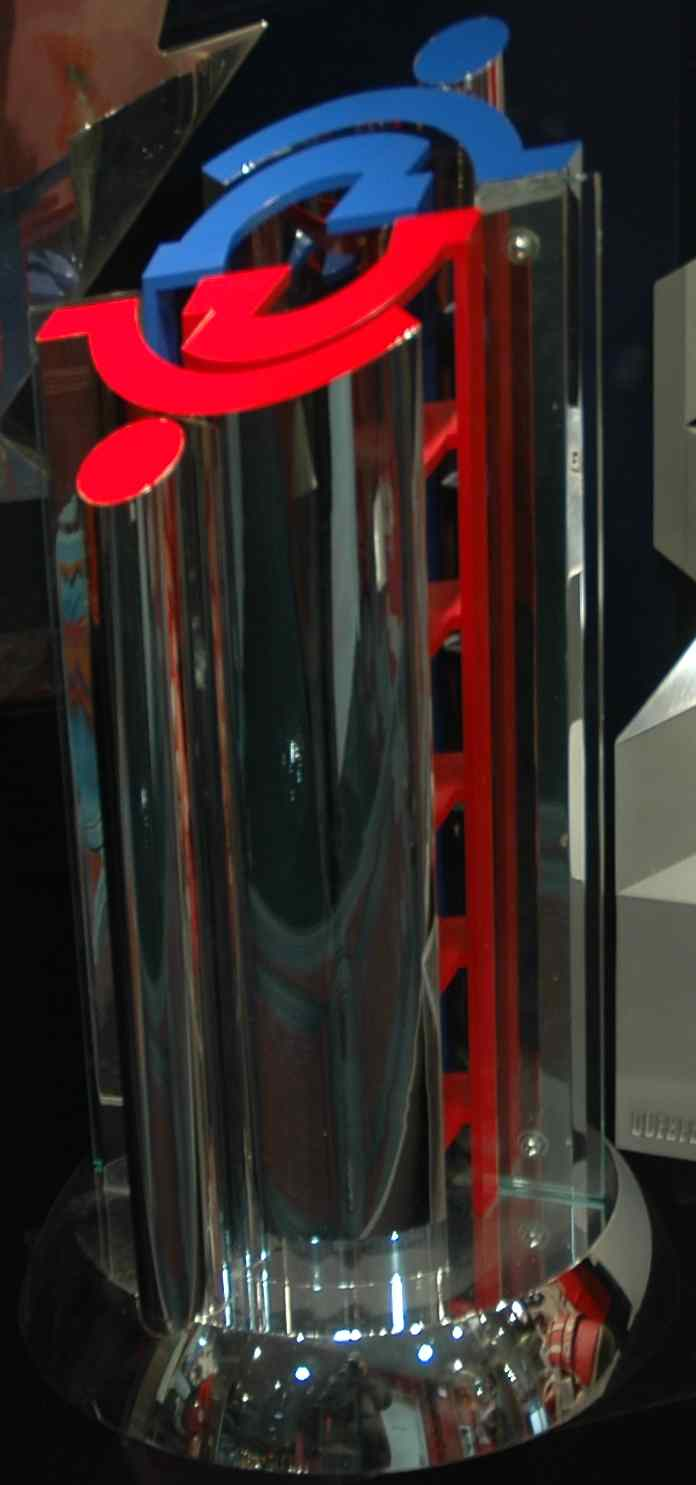
1996 World Cup trophy

In 2004, Canadian American architect Frank Gehry designed a new trophy for the tournament. It is made from a composite alloy of copper and nickel as well as solid cast urethane plastic. The trophy was criticized by the sports community, including the Toronto Sun's headline "What is that?"

== Tournaments ==
Year	Final host	Champion	Final score(s)	Runner-up	Semifinalists
1996	Philadelphia (game 1); Montreal (games 2, 3)	United States	3–4 (OT), 5–2, 5–2	Canada	Russia, Sweden
2004	Toronto	Canada	3–2	Finland	Czech Republic, United States
2016	Toronto	Canada	3–1, 2–1	Europe	Russia, Sweden
2028	Edmonton				

== Titles ==
Team	Winners	Runners-up	Semifinals	Total (top 4)
Canada	2 (2004, 2016)	1 (1996)	—	3
United States	1 (1996)	—	1 (2004)	2
Finland	—	1 (2004)	—	1
Europe	—	1 (2016)	—	1
Sweden	—	—	2 (1996, 2016)	2
Russia	—	—	2 (1996, 2016)	2
Czech Republic	—	—	1 (2004)	1

== See also ==
- List of international ice hockey competitions featuring NHL players
- 4 Nations Face-Off
- Ice hockey at the Olympic Games
