= Sweden men's national ice hockey team =

Men's national ice hockey team representing Sweden

Sweden
- Nickname: Tre Kronor (Three Crowns)
- Association: Swedish Ice Hockey Association
- General manager: Josef Boumedienne; Anders Lundberg
- Head coach: Sam Hallam
- Assistants: Jörgen Jönsson; Stefan Klockare; Anders Sörensen
- Captain: Oliver Ekman-Larsson
- Most games: Jörgen Jönsson (285)
- Top scorer: Sven Tumba (103)
- Most points: Sven Tumba (186)
- Home stadium: Avicii Arena; Stockholm, Sweden
- Team colors
- IIHF code: SWE
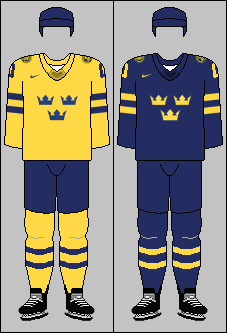

Ranking
- Current IIHF: 5 (▼1) (3 June 2026)
- Highest IIHF: 1 (2006–07, 2013–14)
- Lowest IIHF: 7 (2021, 2024)

First international
- Sweden 8–0 Belgium (Antwerp, Belgium; 23 April 1920)

Biggest win
- Sweden 24–1 Belgium (Prague, Czechoslovakia; 16 February 1947); Sweden 23–0 Italy (St. Moritz, Switzerland; 7 February 1948)

Biggest defeat
- Canada 22–0 Sweden (Chamonix, France; 29 January 1924)

Olympics
- Appearances: 24 (first in 1920)
- Medals: Gold: (1994, 2006); Silver: (1928, 1964, 2014); Bronze: (1952, 1980, 1984, 1988)

IIHF World Championships
- Appearances: 74 (first in 1920)
- Best result: (gold) Gold: (1953, 1957, 1962, 1987, 1991, 1992, 1998, 2006, 2013, 2017, 2018)

World Cup / Canada Cup
- Appearances: 8 (first in 1976)
- Best result: 2nd: (1984)

European Championship
- Appearances: 12
- Best result: (gold) Gold: (1921, 1923, 1932)

International record (W–L–T)
- 1174–799–166

Medal record

Olympic Games
Gold medal – first place	1994 Lillehammer	Team
Gold medal – first place	2006 Turin	Team
Silver medal – second place	1928 St. Moritz	Team
Silver medal – second place	1964 Innsbruck	Team
Silver medal – second place	2014 Sochi	Team
Bronze medal – third place	1952 Oslo	Team
Bronze medal – third place	1980 Lake Placid	Team
Bronze medal – third place	1984 Sarajevo	Team
Bronze medal – third place	1988 Calgary	Team

World Championship
Gold medal – first place	1953 Switzerland	
Gold medal – first place	1957 Soviet Union	
Gold medal – first place	1962 United States	
Gold medal – first place	1987 Austria	
Gold medal – first place	1991 Finland	
Gold medal – first place	1992 Czechoslovakia	
Gold medal – first place	1998 Switzerland	
Gold medal – first place	2006 Latvia	
Gold medal – first place	2013 Sweden/Finland	
Gold medal – first place	2017 Germany/France	
Gold medal – first place	2018 Denmark	
Silver medal – second place	1947 Czechoslovakia	
Silver medal – second place	1951 France	
Silver medal – second place	1963 Sweden	
Silver medal – second place	1967 Austria	
Silver medal – second place	1969 Sweden	
Silver medal – second place	1970 Sweden	
Silver medal – second place	1973 Soviet Union	
Silver medal – second place	1977 Austria	
Silver medal – second place	1981 Sweden	
Silver medal – second place	1986 Soviet Union	
Silver medal – second place	1990 Switzerland	
Silver medal – second place	1993 Germany	
Silver medal – second place	1995 Sweden	
Silver medal – second place	1997 Finland	
Silver medal – second place	2003 Finland	
Silver medal – second place	2004 Czech Republic	
Silver medal – second place	2011 Slovakia	
Bronze medal – third place	1954 Sweden	
Bronze medal – third place	1958 Norway	
Bronze medal – third place	1965 Finland	
Bronze medal – third place	1971 Switzerland	
Bronze medal – third place	1972 Czechoslovakia	
Bronze medal – third place	1974 Finland	
Bronze medal – third place	1975 Germany	
Bronze medal – third place	1976 Poland	
Bronze medal – third place	1979 Soviet Union	
Bronze medal – third place	1994 Italy	
Bronze medal – third place	1999 Norway	
Bronze medal – third place	2001 Germany	
Bronze medal – third place	2002 Sweden	
Bronze medal – third place	2009 Switzerland	
Bronze medal – third place	2010 Germany	
Bronze medal – third place	2014 Belarus	
Bronze medal – third place	2024 Czechia	
Bronze medal – third place	2025 Sweden/Denmark	

European Championship
Gold medal – first place	1921 Sweden	
Gold medal – first place	1923 Belgium	
Gold medal – first place	1932 Germany	
Silver medal – second place	1922 Switzerland	
Silver medal – second place	1924 Italy	

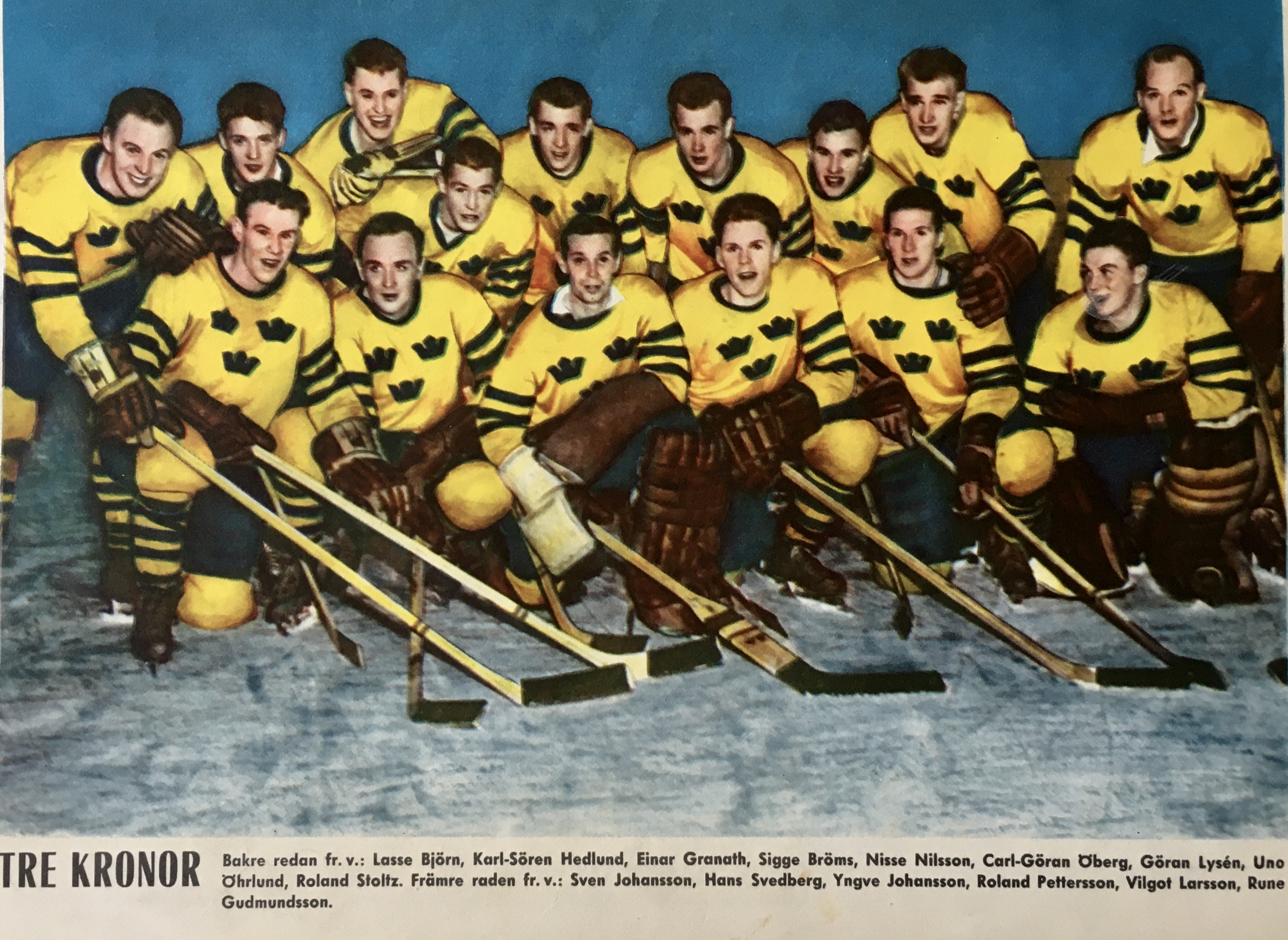
Tre Kronor in November 1958, from the left, standing: Lasse Björn, Karl-Sören "Kalle" Hedlund, Einar Granath, Sigge Bröms, Nils "Double-Nisse" Nilsson, Carl-Göran "Lill-Stöveln" Öberg, Göran Lysén, Uno "Garvis" Öhrlund, Roland "Rolle" Stoltz; front row: Sven "Tumba" Johansson, Hasse Svedberg, Yngve Johansson, Roland "Sura-Pelle" Pettersson, Vilgot "Ville" Larsson and Rune Gudmundsson.

The Sweden men's national ice hockey team (Swedish: Sveriges herrlandslag i ishockey) is governed by the Swedish Ice Hockey Association. It is one of the most successful national ice hockey teams in the world and a member of the so-called "Big Six", the unofficial group of the six strongest men's ice hockey nations, along with Canada, the Czech Republic, Finland, Russia and the United States.

The team's nickname Tre Kronor, meaning "Three Crowns", refers to the emblem on the team jersey, which is found in the lesser national coat of arms of the Kingdom of Sweden. The first time this emblem was used on the national team's jersey was on 12 February 1938, during the World Championships in Prague.

The team has won numerous medals at both the World Championships and the Winter Olympics. In 2006, they became the first team to win both tournaments in the same calendar year, by winning the 2006 Winter Olympics in a thrilling final against Finland by 3–2, and the 2006 World Championships by beating Czech Republic in the final, 4–0. In 2013 the team was the first team to win the World Championships at home since the Soviet Union in 1986. In 2018, the Swedish team won its 11th, and most recent, title at the World Championships.

== Tournament record ==
=== Olympic Games ===
Games	GP	W	L	T	GF	GA	Coach	Captain	Finish
(Belgium) 1920 Antwerp	4	3	1	0	17	20	Raoul Le Mat	Einar Lindqvist	4th
(France) 1924 Chamonix	5	2	3	0	21	49	Unknown	Unknown	4th
(Switzerland) 1928 St. Moritz	5	3	1	1	12	14	Viking Harbom; Sten Mellgren	Carl Abrahamsson	Silver
(United States) 1932 Lake Placid	did not compete								
(Germany) 1936 Garmisch-Partenkirchen	5	2	3	0	5	7	Vic Lindquist	Herman Carlson	6th
(Switzerland) 1948 St. Moritz	8	4	4	0	55	28	Unknown	Unknown	4th
(Norway) 1952 Oslo	8	7	2	0	53	22	Sven Bergqvist	Unknown	Bronze
(Italy) 1956 Cortina d'Ampezzo	7	2	4	1	17	27	Folke "Masen" Jansson	Unknown	4th
(United States) 1960 Squaw Valley	7	2	4	1	40	24	Ed Reigle	Unknown	5th
(Austria) 1964 Innsbruck	8	6	2	0	59	18	Arne Strömberg	Unknown	Silver
(France) 1968 Grenoble	7	4	2	1	23	18	Arne Strömberg	Unknown	4th
(Japan) 1972 Sapporo	6	3	2	1	25	14	Billy Harris	Unknown	4th
(Austria) 1976 Innsbruck	did not compete								
(United States) 1980 Lake Placid, New York	7	4	1	2	31	19	Tommy Sandlin	Mats Waltin	Bronze
(Socialist Federal Republic of Yugoslavia) 1984 Sarajevo	7	4	2	1	36	17	Anders Parmström	Håkan Eriksson	Bronze
(Canada) 1988 Calgary	8	4	1	3	33	21	Tommy Sandlin	Thomas Rundqvist	Bronze
(France) 1992 Albertville	8	5	1	2	30	19	Conny Evensson	Thomas Rundqvist	5th
(Norway) 1994 Lillehammer	8	6	1	1	33	18	Curt Lundmark	Charles Berglund	Gold
(Japan) 1998 Nagano	4	2	2	0	12	9	Kent Forsberg	Calle Johansson	5th
(United States) 2002 Salt Lake City	4	3	1	0	17	8	Hardy Nilsson	Mats Sundin	5th
(Italy) 2006 Turin	8	6	2	0	31	19	Bengt-Åke Gustafsson	Mats Sundin	Gold
(Canada) 2010 Vancouver	4	3	1	0	12	6	Bengt-Åke Gustafsson	Nicklas Lidström	5th
(Russia) 2014 Sochi	6	5	1	0	17	9	Pär Mårts	Henrik Zetterberg; Niklas Kronwall	Silver
(South Korea) 2018 Pyeongchang	4	3	0	1	11	5	Rikard Grönborg	Joel Lundqvist	5th
(China) 2022 Beijing	6	3	1	2	13	13	Johan Garpenlöv	Anton Lander	4th
(Italy) 2026 Milan / Cortina d'Ampezzo	5	3	1	1	17	12	Sam Hallam	Gabriel Landeskog	7th

Totals
Games	Gold	Silver	Bronze	Total
24	2	3	4	9

=== Canada Cup ===
- 1976 – 4th
- 1981 – 5th
- 1984 – 2nd
- 1987 – 3rd
- 1991 – 4th

=== World Cup ===
- 1996 – 3rd
- 2004 – 5th
- 2016 – 3rd

=== European Championship ===
- 1921 – Gold
- 1922 – Silver
- 1923 – Gold
- 1924 – Silver
- 1932 – Gold

=== World Championship ===
- 1931 – 6th place
- 1935 – 5th place
- 1937 – 9th place
- 1938 – 5th place
- 1947 – Silver
- 1949 – 4th place
- 1950 – 5th place
- 1951 – Silver
- 1953 – Gold
- 1954 – Bronze
- 1955 – 5th place
- 1957 – Gold
- 1958 – Bronze
- 1959 – 5th place
- 1961 – 4th place
- 1962 – Gold
- 1963 – Silver
- 1965 – Bronze
- 1966 – 4th place
- 1967 – Silver
- 1969 – Silver
- 1970 – Silver
- 1971 – Bronze
- 1972 – Bronze
- 1973 – Silver
- 1974 – Bronze
- 1975 – Bronze
- 1976 – Bronze
- 1977 – Silver
- 1978 – 4th place
- 1979 – Bronze
- 1981 – Silver
- 1982 – 4th place
- 1983 – 4th place
- 1985 – 6th place
- 1986 – Silver
- 1987 – Gold
- 1989 – 4th place
- 1990 – Silver
- 1991 – Gold
- 1992 – Gold
- 1993 – Silver
- 1994 – Bronze
- 1995 – Silver
- 1996 – 6th place
- 1997 – Silver
- 1998 – Gold
- 1999 – Bronze
- 2000 – 7th place
- 2001 – Bronze
- 2002 – Bronze
- 2003 – Silver
- 2004 – Silver
- 2005 – 4th place
- 2006 – Gold
- 2007 – 4th place
- 2008 – 4th place
- 2009 – Bronze

Games	GP	W	OTW	OTL	L	GF	GA	Coach	Captain	Finish
2010 Germany	9	7	0	0	2	30	15	Bengt-Åke Gustafsson	Magnus Johansson	Bronze
2011 Slovakia	9	6	0	1	2	32	20	Pär Mårts	Rickard Wallin	Silver
2012 Finland/Sweden	8	6	0	0	2	32	19	Pär Mårts	Daniel Alfredsson	6th
2013 Sweden/Finland	10	8	0	0	2	28	14	Pär Mårts	Staffan Kronwall	Gold
2014 Belarus	10	7	1	1	1	28	15	Pär Mårts	Joel Lundqvist	Bronze
2015 Czech Republic	8	4	2	0	2	37	24	Pär Mårts	Staffan Kronwall	5th
2016 Russia	8	3	2	0	3	23	24	Pär Mårts	Jimmie Ericsson	6th
2017 Germany/France	10	7	1	1	1	38	16	Rikard Grönborg	Joel Lundqvist	Gold
2018 Denmark	10	8	2	0	0	43	13	Rikard Grönborg	Mikael Backlund	Gold
2019 Slovakia	8	5	0	1	2	45	26	Rikard Grönborg	Oliver Ekman-Larsson	5th
2021 Latvia	7	3	0	1	3	21	14	Johan Garpenlöv	Henrik Tömmernes	9th
2022 Finland	8	5	1	2	0	30	14	Johan Garpenlöv	Oliver Ekman-Larsson	6th
2023 Finland/Latvia	8	5	1	1	1	27	10	Sam Hallam	Jakob Silfverberg	6th
2024 Czech Republic	10	8	1	0	1	44	19	Sam Hallam	Erik Karlsson	Bronze
2025 Sweden/Denmark	10	8	0	0	2	41	18	Sam Hallam	Rasmus Andersson	Bronze
2026 Switzerland	8	4	0	0	4	28	19	Sam Hallam	Oliver Ekman-Larsson	7th
2027 Germany	Future event									

== Team ==
=== Current roster ===
Roster for the 2026 IIHF World Championship.

Head Coach: Sam Hallam

No.	Pos.	Name	Height	Weight	Birthdate	Team
4	D	Jacob Larsson	1.88 m (6 ft 2 in)	91 kg (201 lb)	29 April 1997 (age 29)	(Switzerland) SC Rapperswil-Jona Lakers
8	D	Robert Hägg	1.88 m (6 ft 2 in)	93 kg (205 lb)	8 February 1995 (age 31)	(Sweden) Brynäs IF
9	F	Linus Karlsson	1.86 m (6 ft 1 in)	88 kg (194 lb)	16 November 1999 (age 26)	(Canada) Vancouver Canucks
10	F	Simon Holmström	1.86 m (6 ft 1 in)	97 kg (214 lb)	24 May 2001 (age 25)	(United States) New York Islanders
13	F	Lucas Raymond – A	1.83 m (6 ft 0 in)	85 kg (187 lb)	28 March 2002 (age 24)	(United States) Detroit Red Wings
14	D	Mattias Ekholm – A	1.93 m (6 ft 4 in)	98 kg (216 lb)	24 May 1990 (age 36)	(Canada) Edmonton Oilers
15	F	Jack Berglund	1.92 m (6 ft 4 in)	95 kg (209 lb)	10 April 2006 (age 20)	(United States) Philadelphia Flyers
16	F	Anton Frondell	1.86 m (6 ft 1 in)	91 kg (201 lb)	7 May 2007 (age 19)	(United States) Chicago Blackhawks
20	F	André Petersson	1.80 m (5 ft 11 in)	88 kg (194 lb)	11 September 1990 (age 35)	(Switzerland) SCL Tigers
23	D	Oliver Ekman-Larsson – C	1.86 m (6 ft 1 in)	88 kg (194 lb)	17 July 1991 (age 35)	(Canada) Toronto Maple Leafs
26	D	Erik Brännström	1.79 m (5 ft 10 in)	81 kg (179 lb)	2 September 1999 (age 26)	(Switzerland) Lausanne HC
33	F	Jakob Silfverberg	1.86 m (6 ft 1 in)	97 kg (214 lb)	13 October 1990 (age 35)	(Sweden) Brynäs IF
34	D	Albert Johansson	1.85 m (6 ft 1 in)	87 kg (192 lb)	4 January 2001 (age 25)	(United States) Detroit Red Wings
40	G	Arvid Söderblom	1.93 m (6 ft 4 in)	94 kg (207 lb)	19 August 1999 (age 26)	(United States) Chicago Blackhawks
41	F	Ivar Stenberg	1.81 m (5 ft 11 in)	83 kg (183 lb)	30 September 2007 (age 18)	(Sweden) Frölunda HC
45	G	Magnus Hellberg	1.97 m (6 ft 6 in)	93 kg (205 lb)	4 April 1991 (age 35)	(Sweden) Djurgårdens IF
51	F	Emil Heineman	1.87 m (6 ft 2 in)	92 kg (203 lb)	16 November 2001 (age 24)	(United States) New York Islanders
61	F	Viggo Björck	1.77 m (5 ft 10 in)	80 kg (180 lb)	12 March 2008 (age 18)	(Sweden) Djurgårdens IF
70	F	Oskar Sundqvist	1.91 m (6 ft 3 in)	95 kg (209 lb)	23 March 1994 (age 32)	(United States) St. Louis Blues
72	D	Tim Heed	1.83 m (6 ft 0 in)	87 kg (192 lb)	27 January 1991 (age 35)	(Switzerland) HC Ambrì-Piotta
73	G	Love Härenstam	1.87 m (6 ft 2 in)	88 kg (194 lb)	18 January 2007 (age 19)	(Sweden) Södertälje SK
74	F	Rasmus Asplund	1.80 m (5 ft 11 in)	86 kg (190 lb)	3 December 1997 (age 28)	(Switzerland) HC Davos
91	F	Carl Grundström	1.84 m (6 ft 0 in)	91 kg (201 lb)	1 December 1997 (age 28)	(United States) Philadelphia Flyers
94	D	Joel Persson	1.86 m (6 ft 1 in)	89 kg (196 lb)	4 March 1994 (age 32)	(Sweden) Växjö Lakers
95	F	Jacob de la Rose	1.90 m (6 ft 3 in)	94 kg (207 lb)	20 May 1995 (age 31)	(Switzerland) HC Fribourg-Gottéron

=== 2026 Olympics roster ===
The first six players of Sweden's roster were announced on 16 June 2025. The remainder of the roster was named on 2 January 2026. On 27 January, Marcus Johansson and Hampus Lindholm were announced as injury replacements for Leo Carlsson and Jonas Brodin, respectively. On 8 February, Gabriel Landeskog was named Sweden's captain, with Victor Hedman and Erik Karlsson serving as alternate captains.

Head coach: Sam Hallam

No.	Pos.	Name	Height	Weight	Birthdate	Team
3	D	Oliver Ekman-Larsson	1.88 m (6 ft 2 in)	92 kg (203 lb)	17 July 1991 (aged 34)	(Canada) Toronto Maple Leafs
4	D	Rasmus Andersson	1.85 m (6 ft 1 in)	92 kg (203 lb)	27 October 1996 (aged 29)	(United States) Vegas Golden Knights
6	D	Philip Broberg	1.91 m (6 ft 3 in)	92 kg (203 lb)	25 June 2001 (aged 24)	(United States) St. Louis Blues
9	F	Filip Forsberg	1.85 m (6 ft 1 in)	93 kg (205 lb)	13 August 1994 (aged 31)	(United States) Nashville Predators
10	F	Alexander Wennberg	1.88 m (6 ft 2 in)	85 kg (187 lb)	22 September 1994 (aged 31)	(United States) San Jose Sharks
14	F	Joel Eriksson Ek	1.91 m (6 ft 3 in)	95 kg (209 lb)	29 January 1997 (aged 29)	(United States) Minnesota Wild
19	F	Adrian Kempe	1.91 m (6 ft 3 in)	90 kg (198 lb)	13 September 1996 (aged 29)	(United States) Los Angeles Kings
23	F	Lucas Raymond	1.83 m (6 ft 0 in)	85 kg (187 lb)	28 March 2002 (aged 23)	(United States) Detroit Red Wings
25	G	Jacob Markström	1.96 m (6 ft 5 in)	93 kg (205 lb)	31 January 1990 (aged 36)	(United States) New Jersey Devils
26	D	Rasmus Dahlin	1.91 m (6 ft 3 in)	94 kg (207 lb)	13 April 2000 (aged 25)	(United States) Buffalo Sabres
27	D	Hampus Lindholm	1.93 m (6 ft 4 in)	100 kg (220 lb)	20 January 1994 (aged 32)	(United States) Boston Bruins
28	F	Elias Lindholm	1.83 m (6 ft 0 in)	92 kg (203 lb)	2 December 1994 (aged 31)	(United States) Boston Bruins
29	F	Pontus Holmberg	1.83 m (6 ft 0 in)	89 kg (196 lb)	9 March 1999 (aged 26)	(United States) Tampa Bay Lightning
30	G	Jesper Wallstedt	1.91 m (6 ft 3 in)	97 kg (214 lb)	14 November 2002 (aged 23)	(United States) Minnesota Wild
32	G	Filip Gustavsson	1.88 m (6 ft 2 in)	90 kg (198 lb)	7 June 1998 (aged 27)	(United States) Minnesota Wild
40	F	Elias Pettersson	1.88 m (6 ft 2 in)	80 kg (176 lb)	12 November 1998 (aged 27)	(Canada) Vancouver Canucks
42	D	Gustav Forsling	1.83 m (6 ft 0 in)	90 kg (198 lb)	12 June 1996 (aged 29)	(United States) Florida Panthers
63	F	Jesper Bratt	1.78 m (5 ft 10 in)	81 kg (179 lb)	30 July 1998 (aged 27)	(United States) New Jersey Devils
65	D	Erik Karlsson – A	1.80 m (5 ft 11 in)	79 kg (174 lb)	31 May 1990 (aged 35)	(United States) Pittsburgh Penguins
67	F	Rickard Rakell	1.85 m (6 ft 1 in)	92 kg (203 lb)	5 March 1993 (aged 32)	(United States) Pittsburgh Penguins
77	D	Victor Hedman – A	1.98 m (6 ft 6 in)	110 kg (243 lb)	18 December 1990 (aged 35)	(United States) Tampa Bay Lightning
88	F	William Nylander	1.83 m (6 ft 0 in)	86 kg (190 lb)	1 May 1996 (aged 29)	(Canada) Toronto Maple Leafs
90	F	Marcus Johansson	1.85 m (6 ft 1 in)	95 kg (209 lb)	6 October 1990 (aged 35)	(United States) Minnesota Wild
92	F	Gabriel Landeskog – C	1.85 m (6 ft 1 in)	92 kg (203 lb)	23 November 1992 (aged 33)	(United States) Colorado Avalanche
93	F	Mika Zibanejad	1.88 m (6 ft 2 in)	92 kg (203 lb)	18 April 1993 (aged 32)	(United States) New York Rangers

== All-time team record ==
The following table shows Sweden's all-time international record in official matches (WC, OG, EC), correct as of 26 May 2024. Teams named in italics are no longer active.

Against	Played	Won	Drawn	Lost	GF	GA
Austria	21	16	2	3	101	14
Belarus	12	10	0	2	43	20
Belgium	3	3	0	0	41	2
Canada	87	29	11	47	227	333
Czech Republic	30	15	7	8	92	74
Denmark	12	11	0	1	61	21
Finland	83	48	15	19	300	195
France	19	17	0	2	85	23
Germany	20	17	1	2	89	33
Great Britain	11	7	0	4	52	20
Hungary	1	1	0	0	3	0
Italy	21	18	3	0	143	27
Japan	4	4	0	0	44	1
Kazakhstan	3	3	0	0	17	6
Latvia	29	25	1	3	120	50
Netherlands	2	2	0	0	16	0
Norway	22	20	2	0	122	30
Poland	29	24	2	3	197	47
Romania	4	4	0	0	35	4
Russia	27	8	3	16	67	88
Slovakia	18	10	3	5	52	41
Slovenia	3	3	0	0	15	2
Spain	1	1	0	0	Walkover	
Switzerland	53	41	6	6	269	99
Ukraine	5	5	0	0	26	6
United States	71	45	8	18	317	204
Czechoslovakia	74	27	11	36	193	206
East Germany	16	15	0	1	110	29
Soviet Union	58	7	8	43	118	279
West Germany	33	30	2	1	190	57
Yugoslavia	2	2	0	0	19	1
Totals:	763	460	86	216	3131	1893

== Awards ==
- The team received the Svenska Dagbladet Gold Medal in 1987, shared with Marie-Helene Westin.
- The 2006 Sweden men's national teams were recognized with the IIHF Milestone Award in 2025, for becoming the first men's national team to win both an Olympic gold medal and the World Championships in the same year. Sweden won gold at the 2006 Winter Olympics and the 2006 IIHF World Championship, the former which was their first Olympic gold since 1994. Eight players participated in both events: Mika Hannula, Jörgen Jönsson, Kenny Jönsson, Niklas Kronwall, Stefan Liv, Mikael Samuelsson, Ronnie Sundin, Henrik Zetterberg.

== Uniform evolution ==
National team jerseys

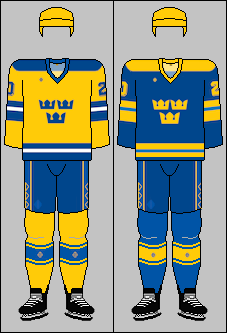
1988 Winter Olympics

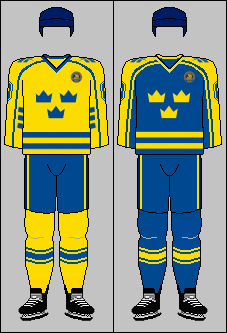
1994 Winter Olympics

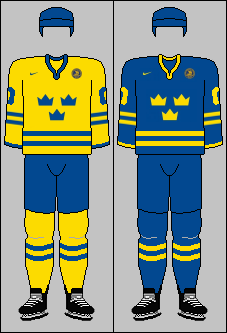
1998-2001 IIHF jerseys

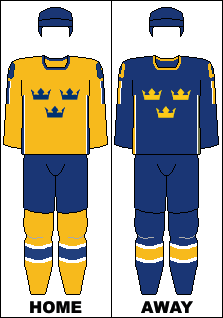
2006 IIHF jerseys

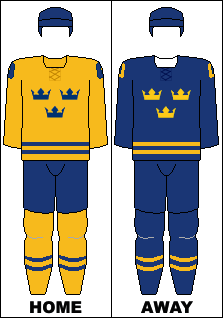
2014 Winter Olympics

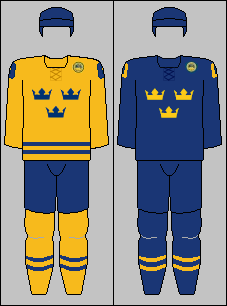
2014–2018 IIHF jerseys

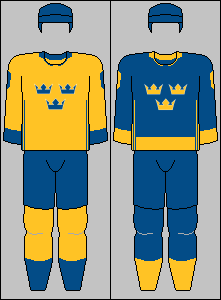
2016 WCH jerseys

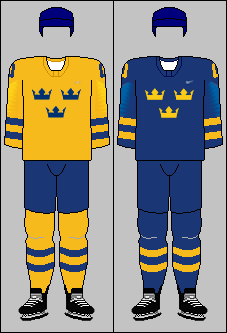
2018 Winter Olympics

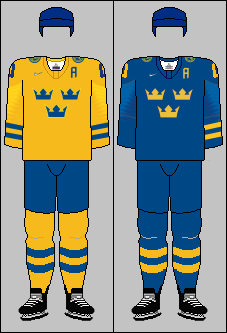
2018–2021 IIHF jerseys

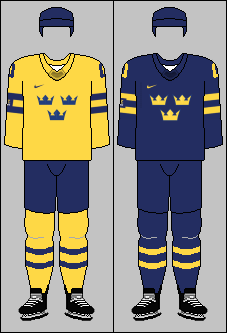
2022 Winter Olympics
