= Pär Mårts =

Swedish ice hockey player and coach

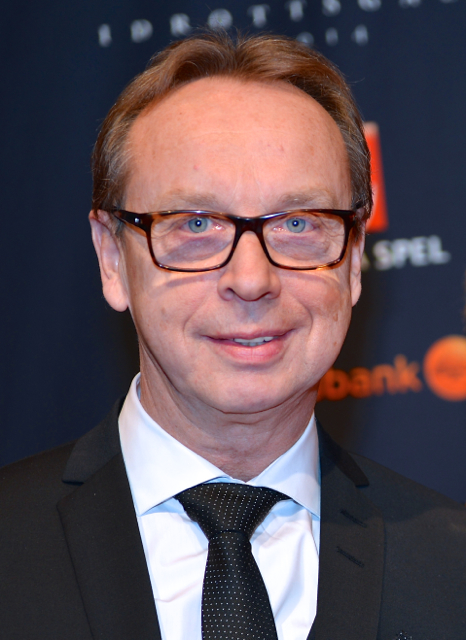
- Pär Mårts during the Swedish Sports Awards inside the Stockholm Globe Arena in January 2014
- Born: 30 April 1953 (age 73) Falun, Sweden
- Position: Forward
- Shot: Left
- Played for: AIK; Västerås IK
- National team: Sweden
- Playing career: 1975–1980
Medal record
Men's Olympic Games
| Gold medal – first place | 1994 Lillehammer | Team |
| Silver medal – second place | 2014 Sochi | Team |
World Championships
| Gold medal – first place | 2013 Sweden/Finland | Team |
| Gold medal – first place | 1992 Czechoslovakia | Team |
| Silver medal – second place | 2011 Slovakia | Team |
| Silver medal – second place | 1995 Sweden | Team |
| Silver medal – second place | 1993 Germany | Team |
| Bronze medal – third place | 1994 Italy | Team |
| Bronze medal – third place | 2014 Belarus | Team |
World Junior Championships
| Silver medal – second place | 2008 Czech Republic | Team |
| Silver medal – second place | 2009 Canada | Team |
| Bronze medal – third place | 2010 Canada | Team |

Pär Mårts (born 30 April 1953) is a Swedish former professional ice hockey player and former coach of the Swedish National team.

== Playing career ==
Mårts started his playing career in 1971 for playing VIK Västerås HK in Swedish third-tier division. The following season the club was promoted to Sweden's second-tier division HockeyAllsvenskan. In his fourth season 1974-75 he joined Stockholm based club AIK helping them win promotion for Elitserien. During the 1975–76 and 1979-80 seasons, he played 174 games in Elitserien, totalling 121 points (63 goals, 58 assists) and 63 penalty minutes. Mårts played his last five seasons of his active playing career for Västerås IK in HockeyAllsvenskan.

== Coaching career ==
Mårts began his coaching career in 1986 and as head coach of HV71, he led them to a Swedish Championship in his first season. He has also coached Västerås IK, the Swedish national junior team, Swedish national team and AIK.

In the 2007–08 season, Mårts took over as head coach for the Swedish national junior teams; Team 19 and Team 20. His contract with the Swedish Ice Hockey Association was signed over three years.

In 2011 the national team, beat the heavy favorite Czech team in Košice, Slovakia, but lost 1-6 in the final to Finland.

== Awards ==
- Gold medal as assistant coach at the 1992 World Championships.
- Silver medal as assistant coach at the 1993 and 1995 World Championships.
- Bronze medal as assistant coach at the 1994 World Championships.
- Olympic gold as assistant coach in 1994.
- Elitserien playoff winner as head coach for HV71 in 2004.
- Swedish Coach of the Year in 2004.
- Silver medal as head coach at the 2008 and 2009 U20 World Championships.
- Bronze medal as head coach at the 2010 U20 World Championships.
- Elitserien silver medal as player in 1978.
- Silver medal as head coach at the 2011 World Championships.
- Gold medal as head coach at the 2013 World Championships.
- Silver medal as head coach at the 2014 Sochi Winter Games.
- Bronze medal as head coach at the 2014 World Championships.

== Career statistics ==
| | | | Regular season | | | | | Playoffs |
| Season | Team | League | GP | G | A | Pts | PIM | GP | G | A | Pts | PIM |
|---|---|---|---|---|---|---|---|---|---|---|---|---|
| 1971-72 | VIK Västerås HK | Swe-3 | 16 | 19 | 14 | 33 | | -- | -- | -- | -- | -- |
| 1972-73 | Västerås IK | Swe-2 | 16 | 4 | 5 | 9 | 2 | -- | -- | -- | -- | -- |
| 1973-74 | Västerås IK | Swe-2 | 27 | 22 | 17 | 39 | 8 | -- | -- | -- | -- | -- |
| 1974-75 | AIK | Swe-2 | 26 | 14 | 15 | 29 | 0 | -- | -- | -- | -- | -- |
| 1975-76 | AIK | SEL | 36 | 11 | 12 | 23 | 7 | -- | -- | -- | -- | -- |
| 1976-77 | AIK | SEL | 32 | 14 | 12 | 26 | 4 | -- | -- | -- | -- | -- |
| 1977-78 | AIK | SEL | 36 | 17 | 11 | 28 | 16 | 6 | 3 | 2 | 5 | 0 |
| 1978-79 | AIK | SEL | 36 | 6 | 9 | 15 | 18 | -- | -- | -- | -- | -- |
| 1979-80 | AIK | SEL | 34 | 15 | 14 | 29 | 18 | -- | -- | -- | -- | -- |
| 1980-81 | Västerås IK | Swe-2 | 26 | 25 | 23 | 48 | 14 | 3 | 1 | 2 | 3 | 6 |
| 1981-82 | Västerås IK | Swe-2 | 32 | 17 | 23 | 40 | 34 | 4 | 0 | 2 | 2 | 2 |
| 1982-83 | Västerås IK | Swe-2 | 28 | 14 | 26 | 40 | 21 | 5 | 4 | 4 | 8 | 4 |
| 1983-84 | Västerås IK | Swe-2 | 27 | 15 | 26 | 41 | 14 | 9 | 2 | 2 | 4 | 6 |
| 1984-85 | Västerås IK | Swe-2 | 25 | 9 | 9 | 18 | 8 | -- | -- | -- | -- | -- |
| Elitserien totals | | | 174 | 63 | 58 | 121 | 63 | 6 | 3 | 2 | 5 | 0 |

Statistics as of 21 April 2006.
