= 1984 Canada Cup =

1984 edition of the Canada Cup

Tournament details
- Host countries: Canada; United States
- Venues: 7 (in 7 host cities)
- Dates: September 1–18, 1984
- Teams: 6

Final positions
- Champions: Canada (2nd title)

Tournament statistics
- Games played: 19
- Goals scored: 138 (7.26 per game)
- Attendance: 156,646 (8,245 per game)
- Scoring leader: (Canada) Wayne Gretzky (12 pts)

Awards
- MVP: (Canada) John Tonelli

The 1984 Labatt Canada Cup was a professional international ice hockey tournament played during the first three weeks of September 1984. The best-of-three final took place between Canada and Sweden, with Canada winning a two game sweep. Canadian forward John Tonelli was named the tournament's most valuable player.

This was the only Canada Cup to feature a team from West Germany, who managed a single point in five games based on a 4–4 tie with Czechoslovakia. This was also the only point for the Czechoslovaks, whose lineup had been weakened by defections, one of whom, Czechoslovak star Peter Šťastný, played for Team Canada in this event. The Canadian team was a disappointing 2–2–1 in the round-robin. There was inner turmoil on the roster, which was dominated by players of two NHL powerhouses, the Edmonton Oilers and the New York Islanders—these two teams had faced off in the past two Stanley Cup Finals, and there were bitter feuds between players that had to be overcome. In one semifinal, fourth place Canada faced first-place USSR, who were a perfect 5–0 in the round-robin. Canada dominated the first two periods, but managed only a 1–0 lead due to spectacular goaltending from Vladimir Myshkin. The Soviets scored twice in the third to take the lead, but defenceman Doug Wilson tied the game late in regulation. In overtime, Myshkin continued his brilliant play. The Soviets got a two-on one against the flow of the play, but were thwarted by a brilliant poke-check by Paul Coffey, who was normally an offensive defenceman. Later on that play, Coffey's point shot was deflected in front of the net by Mike Bossy for the winning goal. In the other semi-final, Sweden scored on its first four shots on goal and cruised to a stunning 9–2 victory over the United States. The Americans had beaten Sweden 7–1 in the round robin and had looked very impressive prior to collapsing in this game.

Canada won Game 1 of the final 5–2. In Game 2, they built up a commanding 5–0 lead in the first period before Sweden mounted a comeback that fell just short. The final score was 6–5.

== Teams ==
As in 1981 and 1976 there were six competing teams. The West German national ice hockey team replaced Finland thanks to its fifth-place finish at the 1983 Ice Hockey World Championships.

== Round-robin standings ==
Team	Pld	W	D	L	GF	GA	GD	Pts	Qualification
Soviet Union	5	5	0	0	22	7	+15	10	Advanced to semifinals
United States	5	3	1	1	21	13	+8	7	Advanced to semifinals
Sweden	5	3	0	2	15	16	−1	6	Advanced to semifinals
Canada (C)	5	2	1	2	23	18	+5	5	Advanced to semifinals
Czechoslovakia	5	0	1	4	10	21	−11	1	
West Germany	5	0	1	4	13	29	−16	1	

(C) Champions

== Game scores ==
=== Round-robin ===
September 1, 1984	United States	7–1 ( 2–0, 2–1, 3–0 )	Sweden	Halifax Metro Centre; Attendance: 6,858

Tom Barrasso	Goalies	Peter Lindmark
12 min	Penalties	8 min
32	Shots	24

September 1, 1984	Canada	7–2 ( 3–0, 2–1, 2–1 )	West Germany	Montreal Forum; Attendance: 9,975

Grant Fuhr	Goalies	Karl Friesen
2 min	Penalties	4 min
34	Shots	25

September 2, 1984	Soviet Union	3–0 ( 0–0, 1–0, 2–0 )	Czechoslovakia	Montreal Forum; Attendance: 7,332

Vladimir Myshkin	Goalies	Dominik Hašek
8 min	Penalties	10 min
22	Shots	20

September 3, 1984	Canada	4–4 ( 2–1, 2–1, 0–2 )	United States	Montreal Forum; Attendance: 10,563

Grant Fuhr	Goalies	Tom Barrasso
12 min	Penalties	16 min
27	Shots	24

September 4, 1984	Soviet Union	3–2 ( 1–0, 1–1, 1–1 )	Sweden	Olympic Saddledome, Calgary; Attendance: 5,759

Vladimir Myshkin	Goalies	Peter Lindmark
12 min	Penalties	14 min
19	Shots	22

September 4, 1984	Czechoslovakia	4–4 ( 0–3, 3–1, 1–0 )	West Germany	London Gardens; Attendance: 2,982

Dominik Hašek (47:41); Jaromír Šindel (12:19)	Goalies	Karl Friesen
30 min	Penalties	28 min
41	Shots	20

September 6, 1984	Sweden	4–2 ( 1–1, 2–0, 1–1 )	Canada	Pacific Coliseum, Vancouver; Attendance: 9,456

Peter Lindmark	Goalies	Pete Peeters
26 min	Penalties	24 min
26	Shots	31

September 6, 1984	Soviet Union	8–1 ( 0–0, 3–0, 5–1 )	West Germany	Northlands Coliseum, Edmonton; Attendance: 2,500

Alexandr Tyznykh	Goalies	Bernard Engelbrecht
2 min	Penalties	6 min
40	Shots	10

September 6, 1984	United States	3–2 ( 1–1, 2–0, 0–1 )	Czechoslovakia	Buffalo Memorial Auditorium; Attendance: 12,352

Tom Barrasso	Goalies	Dominik Hašek
6 min	Penalties	8 min
26	Shots	34

September 8, 1984	Canada	7–2 ( 4–0, 2–1, 1–1 )	Czechoslovakia	Olympic Saddledome, Calgary; Attendance: 11,881

Reggie Lemelin	Goalies	Dominik Hašek (6:29); Jaromír Šindel (53:31)
4 min	Penalties	10 min
29	Shots	21

September 8, 1984	Soviet Union	2–1 ( 1–0, 1–1, 0–0 )	United States	Northlands Coliseum, Edmonton; Attendance: 5,513

Vladimir Myshkin	Goalies	Tom Barrasso
10 min	Penalties	14 min
27	Shots	17

September 8, 1984	Sweden	4–2 ( 1–0, 1–2, 2–0 )	West Germany	Olympic Saddledome, Calgary; Attendance: 6,717

Peter Lindmark	Goalies	Karl Friesen
14 min	Penalties	16 min
34	Shots	23

September 10, 1984	Soviet Union	6–3 ( 2–2, 2–0, 2–1 )	Canada	Northlands Coliseum, Edmonton; Attendance: 12,383

Alexandr Tyznykh	Goalies	Reggie Lemelin
6 min	Penalties	10 min
22	Shots	17

September 10, 1984	United States	6–4 ( 2–2, 2–0, 2–2 )	West Germany	Olympic Saddledome, Calgary; Attendance: 4,985

Glenn Resch	Goalies	Karl Friesen
8 min	Penalties	4 min
38	Shots	25

September 10, 1984	Sweden	4–2 ( 0–2, 2–0, 2–0 )	Czechoslovakia	Pacific Coliseum, Vancouver; Attendance: 2,438

Göte Wälitalo	Goalies	Jaromír Šindel
18 min	Penalties	18 min
30	Shots	22

=== Semi-finals ===
September 12, 1984	Sweden	9–2 ( 4–0, 2–0, 3–2 )	United States	Northlands Coliseum, Edmonton; Attendance: 5,230

Peter Lindmark	Goalies	Tom Barrasso (11:48); Glenn Resch (48:12)
8 min	Penalties	12 min
28	Shots	18

September 13, 1984	Canada	3–2 OT ( 0–0, 1–0, 1–2, 1–0 )	Soviet Union	Olympic Saddledome, Calgary; Attendance: 13,307

Pete Peeters	Goalies	Vladimir Myshkin
10 min	Penalties	12 min
41	Shots	23

=== Final ===
September 16, 1984	Canada	5–2 ( 2–1, 1–0, 2–1 )	Sweden	Olympic Saddledome, Calgary; Attendance: 15,966

Pete Peeters	Goalies	Peter Lindmark
10 min	Penalties	8 min
30	Shots	28

September 18, 1984	Canada	6–5 ( 5–1, 1–3, 0–1 )	Sweden	Northlands Coliseum, Edmonton; Attendance: 10,449

Pete Peeters (41:40); Reggie Lemelin (18:20)	Goalies	Göte Wälitalo (7:13); Peter Lindmark (51:29)
12 min	Penalties	6 min
27	Shots	30

== Final standings ==
1	Canada
2	Sweden
3	Soviet Union
4	United States
5	Czechoslovakia
6	West Germany

== Statistical leaders ==
=== Scoring ===
Player	Team	GP	G	A	Pts	PIM
Wayne Gretzky	Canada	8	5	7	12	2
Michel Goulet	Canada	8	5	6	11	0
Paul Coffey	Canada	8	3	8	11	4
Kent Nilsson	Sweden	8	3	8	11	4
Håkan Loob	Sweden	8	6	4	10	2
Mike Bossy	Canada	8	5	4	9	2
John Tonelli	Canada	8	3	6	9	2
Thomas Steen	Sweden	8	7	1	8	4
Rick Middleton	Canada	7	4	4	8	0
Vladimir Krutov	Soviet Union	6	3	5	8	4

=== Goaltending ===
Player	Team	GP	Min	W	L	T	SO	SV%	GAA
Pete Peeters	Canada	4	234	3	1	0	0	.874	3.33
Vladimir Myshkin	Soviet Union	4	252	3	1	0	1	.940	1.43
Alexander Tyzhnykh	Soviet Union	2	120	2	0	0	0	.852	2.00
Peter Lindmark	Sweden	7	412	3	4	0	0	.889	2.76
Grant Fuhr	Canada	2	120	1	0	1	0	.878	3.00
Rejean Lemelin	Canada	3	138	1	1	0	0	.848	3.04

Minimum 120 minutes played

== Awards ==
Recipient	Team
Most Valuable Player
John Tonelli	Canada
All-Star team
G – Vladimir Myshkin	Soviet Union
D – Paul Coffey	Canada
D – Rod Langway	United States
F – Wayne Gretzky	Canada
F – John Tonelli	Canada
F – Sergei Makarov	Soviet Union

== See also ==
- List of international ice hockey competitions featuring NHL players
