= Stefan Klockare =

Swedish ice hockey player and coach

- Born: May 30, 1972 (age 53) Kalix, Sweden
- Height: 6 ft 0 in (183 cm)
- Weight: 187 lb (85 kg; 13 st 5 lb)
- Position: Defence
- Shot: Left
- Played for: Brynäs IF; Timrå IK
- NHL draft: Undrafted
- Playing career: 1989–2003

Stefan Klockare (born May 30, 1972) is a Swedish former professional ice hockey defenceman. He is currently a coach with Skellefteå AIK of the Swedish Hockey League.

== Career statistics ==
			Regular season					Playoffs
Season	Team	League	GP	G	A	Pts	PIM	GP	G	A	Pts	PIM
1989–90	Bodens IK J20	Juniorserien	—	—	—	—	—	—	—	—	—	—
1989–90	Bodens IK	Division 1	23	0	1	1	8	—	—	—	—	—
1990–91	Brynäs IF	Elitserien	34	1	1	2	4	2	0	0	0	0
1991–92	Brynäs IF	Elitserien	13	0	0	0	2	5	0	0	0	2
1991–92	Team Gävle	Division 1	21	4	7	11	12	—	—	—	—	—
1992–93	Brynäs IF	Elitserien	11	0	0	0	4	10	0	0	0	0
1992–93	Team Gävle	Division 1	23	1	6	7	20	—	—	—	—	—
1993–94	Brynäs IF	Elitserien	39	3	6	9	10	7	0	0	0	4
1994–95	Brynäs IF	Elitserien	40	5	4	9	14	14	0	3	3	8
1995–96	Brynäs IF	Elitserien	21	1	4	5	10	—	—	—	—	—
1995–96	Brynäs IF	Allsvenskan D1	15	3	5	8	10	10	1	1	2	2
1996–97	Brynäs IF	Elitserien	50	4	8	12	24	—	—	—	—	—
1997–98	Brynäs IF	Elitserien	35	1	1	2	18	3	0	1	1	0
1998–99	Timrå IK	Division 1	42	6	11	17	22	4	1	2	3	2
1999–00	Timrå IK	Allsvenskan	46	3	13	16	26	10	1	3	4	4
2000–01	Timrå IK	Elitserien	49	2	1	3	12	—	—	—	—	—
2001–02	Skellefteå AIK	Allsvenskan	40	5	11	16	12	—	—	—	—	—
2002–03	Skellefteå AIK	Allsvenskan	24	5	8	13	8	10	1	2	3	2
Elitserien totals			292	17	25	42	98	41	0	4	4	14
Allsvenskan totals			110	13	32	45	46	20	2	5	7	6
Division 1 totals			109	11	25	36	62	4	1	2	3	2
