= 1996 World Cup of Hockey =

1996 edition of the World Cup of Hockey

Tournament details
- Host countries: Canada; Czech Republic; Finland; Germany; Sweden; United States
- Venues: 9 (in 9 host cities)
- Dates: August 26 – September 14, 1996
- Teams: 8

Final positions
- Champions: United States (1st title)

Tournament statistics
- Games played: 19
- Goals scored: 140 (7.37 per game)
- Scoring leader: (United States) Brett Hull (11 pts)

Awards
- MVP: (United States) Mike Richter

The first World Cup of Hockey (WCH), or the 1996 World Cup of Hockey, (Note: German: Eishockey-Weltpokal 1996, French: Coupe du monde de hockey sur glace 1996, Czech: Světový pohár v ledním hokeji 1996, Swedish: Världscupen i ishockey 1996, Finnish: Jääkiekon maailmancup 1996) was the inaugural edition of the event, replacing the Canada Cup as one of the world championships of ice hockey.

== Inaugural World Cup of Hockey ==
The first edition of the Cup featured eight teams divided into two groups. The European Group, whose games were all played in European cities, included the Czech Republic, Finland, Germany, and Sweden. The North American Group played in North American cities and included Canada, Russia, Slovakia, and the United States. Some of the best players in the world were missing in the tournament, some either declined invitation, such as Dominik Hašek stating "I would love to play in (the competition), but the timing is bad", or because of injuries, as Pavel Bure was injured during a Russia–USA exhibition game in Detroit.

After the teams played a three-game group stage, the top team in each group advanced to the semi-finals, while the second and third place teams played cross-over quarter-finals. The quarter-finals and semi-finals were single elimination games. The championship final was a best-of-three. All playoff games were played in North America.

In the biggest surprise of the tournament, Germany defeated the Czech Republic 7–1 in the European Group, which eliminated the Czechs and sent the Germans into the quarter-finals. In the biggest game of the North American Group, the USA defeated Canada 5–3 to finish first and get a bye to the semi-finals. In the semis, they defeated Russia 5–2, while Canada beat Sweden 3–2 on Theoren Fleury's goal at 19:47 of the second overtime period, ending the longest game in international hockey history.

The tournament did see some controversy after the Canada–Russia game in Vancouver was played when Sweden's coach Kent Forsberg said he believed "Canada cheated its way to victory" through help of Canadian NHL referees that saw two goals disallowed and several controversial penalties for Russia. The Russian team's coach Boris Mikhailov echoed a similar sentiment after the game saying "It was the referees' victory", as Russia felt there was "biased officiating".

In the best-of-three final, Canada won the first game, in Philadelphia, 4–3 in overtime. Then the USA recorded a memorable pair of 5–2 victories in Montreal to win the series. In the third and decisive game, the USA received spectacular goaltending from tournament MVP Mike Richter and rallied from a 2–1 deficit in the third period by scoring four goals in the final 3:18 of the game. Tony Amonte scored the game-winning goal.

== Venues ==
North American pool and playoffs

- Corel Centre – Ottawa, Canada
- CoreStates Center – Philadelphia, U.S.
- General Motors Place – Vancouver, Canada
- Madison Square Garden – New York City, U.S.
- Molson Centre – Montreal, Canada

European pool

- Garmisch Olympia Stadium – Garmisch-Partenkirchen, Germany
- Globen – Stockholm, Sweden
- Helsinki Ice Hall – Helsinki, Finland
- Sportovní hala – Prague, Czech Republic

== Results ==
=== Exhibition Games (incomplete list) ===
- Russia 5–4 Finland (Moscow)
- Sweden 2–3 Russia (Stockholm)
- Germany 2–4 Russia (Landshut)
- Canada 4–4 Russia (Calgary)
- United States 4–6 Russia (Detroit)
- United States 1–3 Canada (Vancouver)
- Canada 5–7 United States (San Jose)
- Slovakia 4–7 Canada (Edmonton)
- Slovakia 2–9 United States (Providence)

=== North American pool ===
Team	Pld	W	L	D	GF	GA	GD	Pts	Qualification
United States	3	3	0	0	19	8	+11	6	Advanced to semifinals
Canada	3	2	1	0	11	10	+1	4	Advanced to quarterfinals
Russia	3	1	2	0	12	14	−2	2	Advanced to quarterfinals
Slovakia	3	0	3	0	9	19	−10	0	

==== Scores ====
- August 29, Vancouver: Russia 3–5 Canada
- August 31, Montreal: Slovakia 4–7 Russia
- August 31, Philadelphia: Canada 3–5 United States
- September 1, Ottawa: Canada 3–2 Slovakia
- September 2, New York City: Russia 2–5 United States
- September 3, New York City: United States 9–3 Slovakia

=== European pool ===
Team	Pld	W	L	D	GF	GA	GD	Pts	Qualification
Sweden	3	3	0	0	14	3	+11	6	Advanced to semifinals
Finland	3	2	1	0	17	11	+6	4	Advanced to quarterfinals
Germany	3	1	2	0	11	15	−4	2	Advanced to quarterfinals
Czech Republic	3	0	3	0	4	17	−13	0	

==== Scores ====
- August 26, Stockholm: Germany 1–6 Sweden
- August 27, Helsinki: Finland 7–3 Czech Republic
- August 28, Helsinki: Germany 3–8 Finland
- August 29, Prague: Sweden 3–0 Czech Republic
- August 31, Garmisch: Czech Republic 1–7 Germany
- September 1, Stockholm: Finland 2–5 Sweden

=== Knockout stage ===
Quarterfinals
September 6
E2	Finland	0
NA3	Russia	5
September 5
E3	Germany	1
NA2	Canada	4

Semifinals
September 8
Russia	2
United States	5
September 7
Canada	3
Sweden	2

Final
September 10–14
United States	3	5	5
Canada	4	2	2

==== Quarterfinals ====
- September 5, Montreal: Germany 1–4 Canada
- September 6, Ottawa: Russia 5–0 Finland

==== Semifinals ====
- September 7, Philadelphia: Canada 3–2 Sweden (2OT)
- September 8, Ottawa: Russia 2–5 United States

==== Finals ====
- September 10, Philadelphia: Canada 4–3 United States (OT)
- September 12, Montreal: United States 5–2 Canada
- September 14, Montreal: United States 5–2 Canada

== Statistics and awards ==
1996 World Cup of Hockey winners

United States
1st title

=== Tournament MVP ===
- (United States) Mike Richter

=== All-star team ===
- Goaltender: (United States) Mike Richter
- Defence: (Sweden) Calle Johansson; (United States) Chris Chelios
- Forwards: (United States) Brett Hull; (Sweden) Mats Sundin; (United States) John LeClair

=== Final standings ===
1	United States
2	Canada
3	Sweden
4	Russia
5	Finland
6	Germany
7	Slovakia
8	Czech Republic

=== Top scorers ===
Rk	Player	GP	G	A	Pts	PIM
1	(United States) Brett Hull	7	7	4	11	4
2	(United States) John LeClair	7	6	4	10	6
3	(Sweden) Mats Sundin	4	4	3	7	4
4	(United States) Doug Weight	7	3	4	7	12
5	(Canada) Wayne Gretzky	8	3	4	7	2
6	(United States) Brian Leetch	7	0	7	7	4
7	(Canada) Paul Coffey	7	0	7	7	12
8	(Russia) Sergei Fedorov	5	3	3	6	2
9	(Russia) Alexander Mogilny	5	2	4	6	0
10	(United States) Keith Tkachuk	7	5	1	6	44
11	(Canada) Theoren Fleury	8	4	2	6	8

- Leading Goaltender: (Canada) Curtis Joseph (2.31 GAA)

== See also ==
- World Cup of Hockey
- List of international ice hockey competitions featuring NHL players
- 2004 World Cup of Hockey
- International Ice Hockey Federation
- Summit Series
- National Hockey League
