= Canada Cup =

Former ice hockey tournament for men's national teams

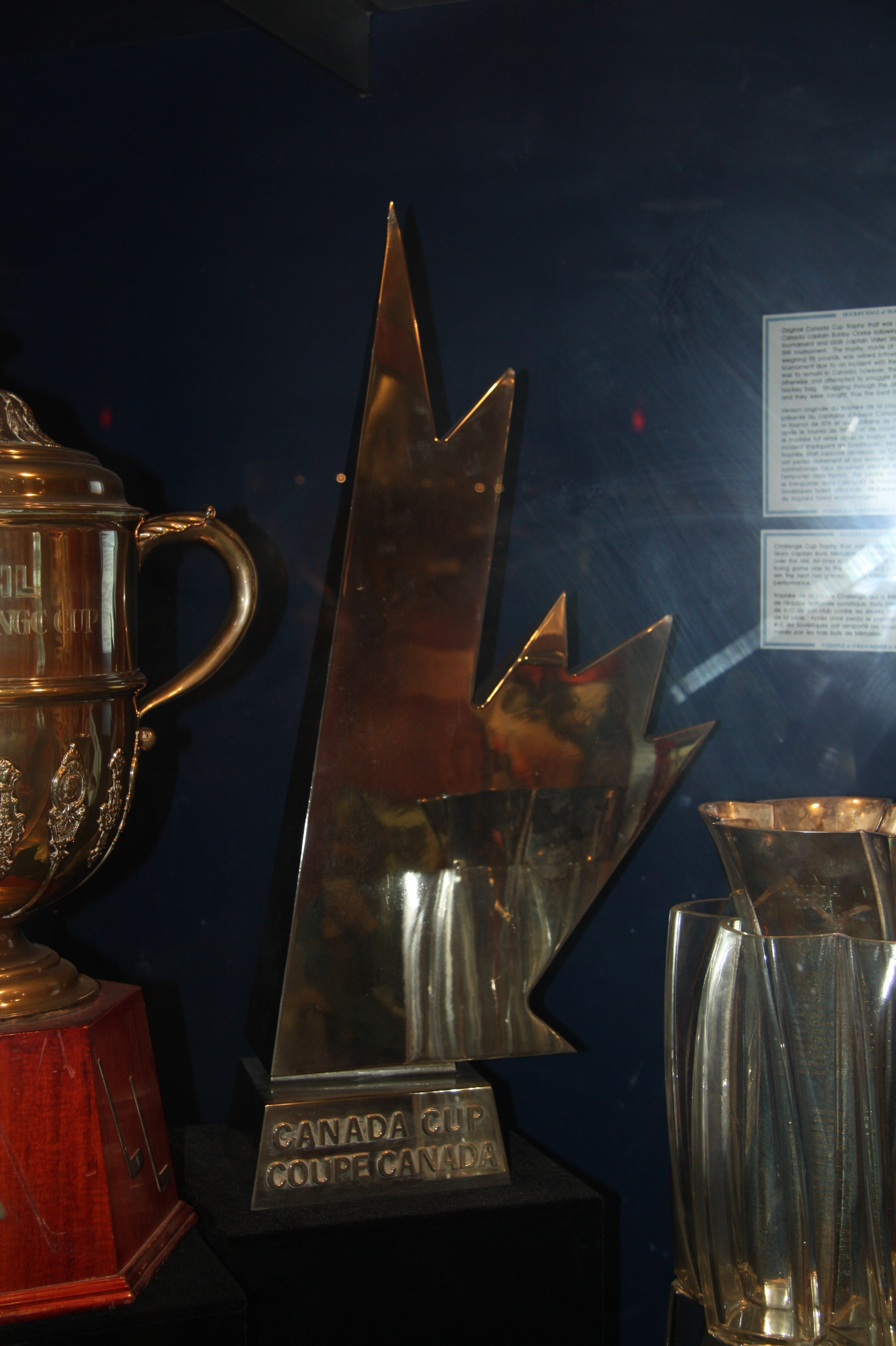
- Canada Cup in the Hockey Hall of Fame
- Sport: Ice hockey
- Founded: 1976
- First season: 1976
- Folded: 1991
- Replaced by: World Cup of Hockey
- No. of teams: 6
- Country: Canada
- Last champion: Canada (1991, 4th title)
- Most titles: Canada (4 titles)

The Canada Cup (French: Coupe Canada) was an invitational international ice hockey tournament held on five occasions between 1976 and 1991. The brainchild of Toronto lawyer Alan Eagleson, the tournament was created to meet demand for a true world championship that allowed the best players from participating nations to compete regardless of their status as professional or amateur. It was sanctioned by the International Ice Hockey Federation, Hockey Canada and the National Hockey League. Canada won the tournament four times, while the Soviet Union captured the championship once. It was succeeded by the World Cup of Hockey in 1996.

== History ==
Due to National Hockey League (NHL) players' ineligibility in the Winter Olympics and the annual World Championships, both amateur competitions, Canada was not able to send its best players to top international tournaments. While the top players in Europe qualified as amateurs, all the best Canadian players competed in the professional NHL or World Hockey Association.

Following the 1972 and 1974 Summit Series, in which Canadian players from the NHL and WHA competed against the top players from the Soviet Union, there was interest in a world hockey championship where each country could send its best players. In a combined effort from Doug Fisher of Hockey Canada and Alan Eagleson of the NHL Players' Association, plans for such a tournament soon began.

After successful negotiations with hockey officials from the Soviet Union in September 1974, Eagleson began arranging the Canada Cup tournament, which debuted in 1976. Eagleson would later plead guilty to embezzling hundreds of thousands of dollars of Canada Cup proceeds.

Taking place in the NHL off-season, it was the first international hockey tournament in which the best players, professional and amateur alike, from the best ice hockey nations in the world could compete against one another. Six teams competed in each edition. In addition to Canada and the Soviet Union, Czechoslovakia, Finland, Sweden and the United States were regular competitors (with the exception of West Germany replacing Finland in 1984). The tournaments, held every three to five years, took place in North American venues. Of the five Canada Cup tournaments, four were won by Canada, while the Soviet Union won once, in 1981.

Canada won the inaugural Canada Cup in 1976, defeating recent 1976 World Championship gold medalists Czechoslovakia in the best-of-three final. The clinching game was won by a 5–4 score with Darryl Sittler scoring the game-winner in overtime. Five years later, the Soviets won their first and only Canada Cup with an 8–1 win over Canada in the one-game final. The Canadians then re-captured the championship in the third edition of the tournament in 1984. After Canadian Mike Bossy scored an overtime game-winner to defeat the Soviets in the semi-finals, Canada won their second Canada Cup in a victory over Sweden in the final.

The 1987 Canada Cup was particularly noteworthy as Wayne Gretzky and Mario Lemieux, widely considered two of the greatest hockey players of all-time, joined as linemates on Team Canada to capture the country's third championship. All three games in the final between Canada and the Soviets ended in 6–5 scores, with two games going to overtime. Lemieux dramatically scored the championship-winning goal on a 2-on-1 pass from Gretzky in the final minutes of the deciding game at Copps Coliseum in Hamilton, Ontario.

The final Canada Cup was held in 1991 with Canada defeating the United States in the tournament's first all-North American final, for their third straight championship and fourth overall. Five years later, the Canada Cup was replaced by the World Cup of Hockey in 1996.

== Trophy ==
The Canada Cup trophy is shaped like half of a maple leaf and is made of solid nickel (120 pounds (54 kg) worth). It was refined by Inco Ltd in Sudbury Ontario, commissioned by D. Scott McCann (at the time President of Teledyne Canada). Donna Scott (Queen's University, Bachelor of Fine Arts, 1985) designed the cup, citing as her inspiration Pink Floyd's The Dark Side of the Moon album cover.

=== Controversy ===
The 1981 win by the Soviet Union caused controversy when Canadian officials found the trophy in the Soviets' luggage and announced that the trophy would not actually go home with the winning team. Feeling this was unsportsmanlike, Canadian fans led by George Smith of Winnipeg, Manitoba raised money to produce a duplicate trophy to give to the Soviet team. $32,000 was raised. Three weeks later the trophy was presented to the Soviet Union's ambassador Vladimir Mechulayev in Winnipeg. Most of the companies that made the trophy did the work for free and almost all of the money raised went to minor hockey in Winnipeg and Winkler, Manitoba.

== Competitions ==
Year	Champion	Runner-up	Semi-finalists	MVP
1976	Canada	Czechoslovakia	None (Note: No semi-finals were played in the 1976 tournament. Only the top two teams from the round-robin stage qualified for the final. The Soviet Union and Sweden placed 3rd and 4th in the round-robin stage, making them the tournament's de facto semi-finalists.)	(Canada) Bobby Orr
1981	Soviet Union	Canada	Czechoslovakia and United States	(Soviet Union) Vladislav Tretiak
1984	Canada	Sweden	Soviet Union and United States	(Canada) John Tonelli
1987	Canada	Soviet Union	Sweden and Czechoslovakia	(Canada) Wayne Gretzky
1991	Canada	United States	Finland and Sweden	(Canada) Bill Ranford

== All-time results table ==
Nation	Number of appearances	Games	Wins	Losses	Ties	Pct.	GF	GA	Best result
Canada	5	39	28	5	6	.795	181	105	Winners: 1976, 1984, 1987, 1991
Soviet Union	5	32	18	10	4	.625	135	85	Winners: 1981
United States	5	30	13	14	3	.483	97	106	Runners-up: 1991
Sweden	5	30	12	17	1	.417	92	106	Runners-up: 1984
Czechoslovakia	5	29	8	16	5	.362	81	96	Runners-up: 1976
Finland	4	21	3	16	2	.190	44	116	Semi-final: 1991
West Germany	1	5	0	4	1	.100	13	29	Sixth place: 1984

== See also ==
- Ice Hockey World Championships
- Ice hockey at the Olympic Games
- List of international ice hockey competitions featuring NHL players
