= Speed skating at the 1936 Winter Olympics – Men's 5000 metres =

Men's 5000 metres speed skating at the IV Olympic Winter Games
- Pictogram for speed skating
- Venue: Riessersee
- Date: 12 February 1936
- Competitors: 37 from 16 nations
- Winning time: 8:19.6 OR

Medalists
1st place, gold medalist(s)		Ivar Ballangrud	Norway
2nd place, silver medalist(s)		Birger Wasenius	Finland
3rd place, bronze medalist(s)		Antero Ojala	Finland

The 5000 metres speed skating event was part of the speed skating at the 1936 Winter Olympics programme. The competition was held on Wednesday, 12 February 1936. Thirty-seven speed skaters from 16 nations competed.

== Medalists ==
Gold	Silver	Bronze
Ivar Ballangrud; Norway	Birger Wasenius; Finland	Antero Ojala; Finland

== Records ==
These were the standing world and Olympic records (in minutes) prior to the 1936 Winter Olympics.

World record	8:17.2(*)	(Norway) Ivar Ballangrud	Oslo (NOR)	18 January 1936
Olympic record	8:39.0	(Finland) Clas Thunberg	Chamonix (FRA)	26 January 1924

(*) The record was set on naturally frozen ice.

Nine speed skaters bettered the twelve years old Olympic record. Ivar Ballangrud set a new Olympic record with 8:19.6 seconds.

== Results ==
Place	Athlete	Time
1	Ivar Ballangrud (NOR)	8:19.6
2	Birger Wasenius (FIN)	8:23.3
3	Antero Ojala (FIN)	8:30.1
4	Jan Langedijk (NED)	8:32.0
5	Max Stiepl (AUT)	8:35.0
6	Ossi Blomqvist (FIN)	8:36.6
7	Charles Mathiesen (NOR)	8:36.9
8	Karl Wazulek (AUT)	8:38.4
9	Michael Staksrud (NOR)	8:38.5
10	Dolf van der Scheer (NED)	8:43.3
11	Robert Petersen (USA)	8:46.5
12	Janusz Kalbarczyk (POL)	8:47.7
13	Roelof Koops (NED)	8:48.5
13	Heinz Sames (GER)	8:48.5
15	Eddie Schroeder (USA)	8:49.1
16	Lou Dijkstra (NED)	8:51.5
17	László Hidvéghy (HUN)	8:53.2
18	Alfons Bērziņš (LAT)	8:53.4
19	Wilhelm Löwinger (AUT)	8:53.9
20	Edward Wangberg (NOR)	8:54.7
21	Seien Kin (JPN)	8:55.9
22	Åke Ekman (FIN)	9:00.4
22	Aleksander Mitt (EST)	9:00.4
24	Karl Prochaska (AUT)	9:02.6
25	Thomas White (CAN)	9:04.5
26	Axel Johansson (SWE)	9:06.4
27	Yushoku Cho (JPN)	9:08.7
27	Seitoku Ri (JPN)	9:08.7
29	Arvīds Lejnieks (LAT)	9:11.9
30	Jānis Andriksons (LAT)	9:15.0
31	Kunio Nando (JPN)	9:20.1
32	Jaroslav Turnovský (TCH)	9:25.8
33	Kenneth Kennedy (AUS)	9:48.9
34	Oldřich Hanč (TCH)	10:03.0
35	James Graeffe (BEL)	10:52.6
–	Charles De Ligne (BEL)	DNF
–	Willy Sandner (GER)	DNF
