= Speed skating at the 1936 Winter Olympics – Men's 1500 metres =

Men's 1500 metres speed skating at the IV Olympic Winter Games
- Pictogram for speed skating
- Venue: Riessersee
- Date: 13 February 1936
- Competitors: 37 from 15 nations
- Winning time: 2:19.2

Medalists
1st place, gold medalist(s)		Charles Mathiesen	Norway
2nd place, silver medalist(s)		Ivar Ballangrud	Norway
3rd place, bronze medalist(s)		Birger Wasenius	Finland

The 1500 metres speed skating event was part of the speed skating at the 1936 Winter Olympics programme. The competition was held on Thursday, 13 February 1936. Thirty-seven speed skaters from 15 nations competed.

== Medalists ==
Gold	Silver	Bronze
Charles Mathiesen; Norway	Ivar Ballangrud; Norway	Birger Wasenius; Finland

== Records ==
These were the standing world and Olympic records (in minutes) prior to the 1936 Winter Olympics.

World record	2:17.4(*)	(Norway) Oscar Mathisen	Davos (SUI)	18 January 1914
Olympic record	2:20.8	(Finland) Clas Thunberg	Chamonix (FRA)	27 January 1924

(*) The record was set in a high altitude venue (more than 1000 metres above sea level) and on naturally frozen ice.

Charles Mathiesen set a new Olympic record with 2:19.2 seconds.

== Results ==
Place	Athlete	Time
1	Charles Mathiesen (NOR)	2:19.2
2	Ivar Ballangrud (NOR)	2:20.2
3	Birger Wasenius (FIN)	2:20.9
4	Leo Freisinger (USA)	2:21.3
5	Max Stiepl (AUT)	2:21.6
6	Karl Wazulek (AUT)	2:22.2
7	Harry Haraldsen (NOR)	2:22.4
8	Hans Engnestangen (NOR)	2:23.0
9	Ossi Blomqvist (FIN)	2:23.2
9	Antero Ojala (FIN)	2:23.2
9	Dolf van der Scheer (NED)	2:23.2
12	Karl Leban (AUT)	2:24.3
12	Eddie Schroeder (USA)	2:24.3
14	Jan Langedijk (NED)	2:24.6
15	Seien Kin (JPN)	2:25.0
16	Willy Sandner (GER)	2:25.3
17	Robert Petersen (USA)	2:25.4
18	Alfons Bērziņš (LAT)	2:25.8
19	Shozo Ishihara (JPN)	2:26.7
20	Lou Dijkstra (NED)	2:27.2
20	Åke Ekman (FIN)	2:27.2
22	Aleksander Mitt (EST)	2:27.8
23	Jānis Andriksons (LAT)	2:28.9
23	Seitoku Ri (JPN)	2:28.9
25	Ferdinand Preindl (AUT)	2:29.0
25	László Hidvéghy (HUN)	2:29.0
27	Heinz Sames (GER)	2:29.3
28	Yasuo Kawamura (JPN)	2:29.6
29	Axel Johansson (SWE)	2:29.9
30	Roelof Koops (NED)	2:30.0
31	Jaroslav Turnovský (TCH)	2:30.5
32	Allan Potts (USA)	2:31.2
33	Kenneth Kennedy (AUS)	2:31.8
34	Thomas White (CAN)	2:34.2
35	Oldřich Hanč (TCH)	2:57.8
36	James Graeffe (BEL)	3:00.5
37	Charles De Ligne (BEL)	3:21.9
