= Speed skating at the 1936 Winter Olympics – Men's 500 metres =

Men's 500 metres speed skating at the IV Olympic Winter Games
- Pictogram for speed skating
- Venue: Riessersee
- Date: 11 February 1936
- Competitors: 36 from 14 nations
- Winning time: 43.4

Medalists
1st place, gold medalist(s)		Ivar Ballangrud	Norway
2nd place, silver medalist(s)		Georg Krog	Norway
3rd place, bronze medalist(s)		Leo Freisinger	United States

The 500 metres speed skating event was part of the speed skating at the 1936 Winter Olympics programme. The competition was held on Tuesday, 11 February 1936. Thirty-six speed skaters from 14 nations competed.

== Medalists ==
Gold	Silver	Bronze
Ivar Ballangrud; Norway	Georg Krog; Norway	Leo Freisinger; United States

== Records ==
These were the standing world and Olympic records (in seconds) prior to the 1936 Winter Olympics.

World record	42.4(*)	(United States) Allan Potts	Oslo (NOR)	18 January 1936
Olympic Record	43.4	(Finland) Clas Thunberg	St. Moritz (SUI)	13 February 1928
Olympic Record	43.4	(Norway) Bernt Evensen	St. Moritz (SUI)	13 February 1928
Olympic Record	43.4(**)	(United States) Jack Shea	Lake Placid (USA)	4 February 1932

(*) The record was set on naturally frozen ice.

(**) This time was set in pack-style format, having all competitors skate at the same time.

Ivar Ballangrud equalized the Olympic record with 43.4 seconds.

== Results ==
Place	Athlete	Time
1	Ivar Ballangrud (NOR)	43.4
2	Georg Krog (NOR)	43.5
3	Leo Freisinger (USA)	44.0
4	Shozo Ishihara (JPN)	44.1
5	Delbert Lamb (USA)	44.2
6	Karl Leban (AUT)	44.8
6	Allan Potts (USA)	44.8
8	Antero Ojala (FIN)	44.9
8	Jorma Ruissalo (FIN)	44.9
8	Birger Wasenius (FIN)	44.9
11	Reikichi Nakamura (JPN)	45.0
11	Robert Petersen (USA)	45.0
13	Karl Wazulek (AUT)	45.1
14	Alfons Bērziņš (LAT)	45.7
14	Dolf van der Scheer (NED)	45.7
16	Jānis Andriksons (LAT)	45.9
16	Seitoku Ri (JPN)	45.9
18	Axel Johansson (SWE)	46.1
19	Ossi Blomqvist (FIN)	46.2
19	Willi Sandner (GER)	46.2
21	Ferdinand Preindl (AUT)	46.4
22	Aleksander Mitt (EST)	46.6
22	Kunio Nando (JPN)	46.6
24	Lou Dijkstra (NED)	46.7
24	Jan Langedijk (NED)	46.7
24	Gustav Slanec (AUT)	46.7
27	Ben Blaisse (NED)	46.9
28	Heinz Sames (GER)	47.0
29	Kenneth Kennedy (AUS)	47.4
30	Jaroslav Turnovský (TCH)	47.8
31	Thomas White (CAN)	49.6
32	Oldřich Hanč (TCH)	49.8
33	James Graeffe (BEL)	54.6
34	Harry Haraldsen (NOR)	54.9
35	Charles De Ligne (BEL)	1:44.6
–	Hans Engnestangen (NOR)	DNF
