= Speed skating at the 1936 Winter Olympics – Men's 10,000 metres =

Men's 10,000 metres speed skating at the IV Olympic Winter Games
- Pictogram for speed skating
- Venue: Riessersee
- Date: 14 February 1936
- Competitors: 30 from 14 nations
- Winning time: 17:24.3 OR

Medalists
1st place, gold medalist(s)		Ivar Ballangrud	Norway
2nd place, silver medalist(s)		Birger Wasenius	Finland
3rd place, bronze medalist(s)		Max Stiepl	Austria

The 10,000 metres speed skating event was part of the speed skating at the 1936 Winter Olympics programme. The competition was held on Friday, 14 February 1936. Thirty speed skaters from 14 nations competed.

== Medalists ==
Gold	Silver	Bronze
Ivar Ballangrud; Norway	Birger Wasenius; Finland	Max Stiepl; Austria

== Records ==
These were the standing world and Olympic records (in minutes) prior to the 1936 Winter Olympics.

World record	17:17.4(*)	(Norway) Armand Carlsen	Davos (SUI)	5 February 1928
Olympic Record	18:04.8	(Finland) Julius Skutnabb	Chamonix (FRA)	27 January 1924
Olympic Record	17:56.2(**)	(Canada) Alexander Hurd	Lake Placid (USA)	6 February 1932

(*) The record was set in a high altitude venue (more than 1000 metres above sea level) and on naturally frozen ice.

(**) This time was set in pack-style format, having all competitors skate at the same time.

Fifteen speed skaters bettered the twelve years old Olympic record. At first Charles Mathiesen bettered the old record in the first pair with a time of 17:41.2 minutes, then Max Stiepl set a new record with 17:30.0 minutes. Finally Ivar Ballangrud set a new Olympic record with 17:24.3 minutes.

== Results ==
Place	Athlete	Time
1	Ivar Ballangrud (NOR)	17:24.3
2	Birger Wasenius (FIN)	17:28.2
3	Max Stiepl (AUT)	17:30.0
4	Charles Mathiesen (NOR)	17:41.2
5	Ossi Blomqvist (FIN)	17:42.4
6	Jan Langedijk (NED)	17:43.7
7	Antero Ojala (FIN)	17:46.6
8	Eddie Schroeder (USA)	17:52.0
9	Janusz Kalbarczyk (POL)	17:54.0
10	Michael Staksrud (NOR)	17:56.7
11	Karl Wazulek (AUT)	17:57.1
12	Willy Sandner (GER)	18:02.0
13	Seien Kin (JPN)	18:02.7
14	László Hidvéghy (HUN)	18:04.0
15	Heinz Sames (GER)	18:04.3
16	Dolf van der Scheer (NED)	18:04.9
17	Roelof Koops (NED)	18:11.5
18	Edward Wangberg (NOR)	18:15.8
19	Alfons Bērziņš (LAT)	18:22.5
20	Lou Dijkstra (NED)	18:23.6
21	Thomas White (CAN)	18:25.3
22	Axel Johansson (SWE)	18:38.2
23	Arvīds Lejnieks (LAT)	18:41.2
24	Wilhelm Löwinger (AUT)	18:46.5
25	Seitoku Ri (JPN)	18:50.3
26	Yushoku Cho (JPN)	19:00.1
27	Franz Ortner (AUT)	19:19.1
28	Charles De Ligne (BEL)	23:32.9
–	Robert Petersen (USA)	DNF
–	Aleksander Mitt (EST)	DNF
