= 1936 in sports =

1936 in sports describes the year's events in world sport.

== Alpine skiing ==
FIS Alpine World Ski Championships 6th FIS Alpine World Ski Championships are held at Innsbruck, Austria. The events are a downhill, a slalom and a combined race in both the men's and women's categories. The winners are:

- Men's Downhill – Rudolf Rominger (Switzerland)
- Men's Slalom – Rudolph Matt (Austria)
- Men's Combined – Rudolf Rominger (Switzerland)
- Women's Downhill – Evelyn Pinching (Great Britain)
- Women's Slalom – Gerda Paumgarten (Austria)
- Women's Combined – Evelyn Pinching (Great Britain)

== American football ==
- NFL Championship: the Green Bay Packers won 21–6 over the Boston Redskins. The game was moved from Boston to New York's Polo Grounds due to fan apathy.
- Rose Bowl (1935 season):
  - The SMU Mustangs lose 7–0 to the Stanford Indians; share national championship
- Minnesota Golden Gophers – college football national championship; first season in which a national champion was declared by the AP Poll.
- First NFL draft held
- Second American Football League (AFL) founded
- Cleveland Rams founded by Homer Marsh as part of AFL

== Association football ==
England

- First Division – Sunderland win the 1935–36 title.
- FA Cup – Arsenal beat Sheffield United 1–0, thanks to a Ted Drake goal.

Spain

- La Liga won by Athletic Bilbao

Germany

- German football championship won by Nürnberg

Italy

- Serie A won by Bologna

Portugal

- Primeira Liga won by S.L. Benfica

France

- French Division 1 won by RC Paris

Ukraine

- FC Shakhtar Donetsk was founded in May (Former part of Soviet Union)

== Australian rules football ==
- Victorian Football League
  - Collingwood wins the 40th VFL Premiership, beating South Melbourne 11.23 (89) to 10.18 (78) in the 1936 VFL Grand Final.
  - Brownlow Medal awarded to Dinny Ryan (Fitzroy)
- South Australian National Football League
  - 1 August: Glenelg 14.9 (93) defeat South Adelaide 9.32 (86) despite having 23 scoring shots against South's 41. The eighteen-shot deficit is the greatest deficit in scoring shots by a winning team in a major Australian Rules league.
  - 3 October: Port Adelaide 13.19 (97) defeat Sturt 14.10 (94) for their first premiership since 1929 and their eleventh overall. It is the only SANFL Grand Final where the winning team scored fewer goals than the losing team.
  - Magarey Medal won by Bill McCallum (Norwood)
- Western Australian National Football League
  - 10 October: East Perth 11.5 (71) defeat Claremont 9.6 (60) to win their eighth WANFL premiership.
  - Sandover Medal won by George Moloney (Claremont)

== Baseball ==
- Japanese Baseball League, as predecessor for Japan Central League and Pacific League of Japan, a first officially game held on February 9.
- Plans are announced for a Baseball Hall of Fame to be established in 1939, the game's supposed centennial, in Cooperstown, New York. In the first elections to select 15 initial inductees (5 from the 19th century and 10 from the 20th), Ty Cobb, Babe Ruth, Honus Wagner, Christy Mathewson and Walter Johnson are selected from the 20th century; the election for 19th century players is plagued by problems and results in no selections. See: Baseball Hall of Fame balloting, 1936
- World Series – New York Yankees defeat the New York Giants, 4–2.
- Nagoya Baseball Club, as predecessor for Chunichi Dragons, officially founded in Japan on January 15.

== Basketball ==
- August 14 – 1936 Summer Olympics: The United States men's national basketball team wins the first Olympic basketball tournament in the final game over Canada, 19–8.
- The first season for Argentine Basketball Club Championship League was held, Huracan de Rosario has first season's champion.

== Boxing ==
Events

- 19 June – in one of boxing's biggest-ever upsets, Max Schmeling knocks out Joe Louis at 2:29 of round 12 at New York's Yankee Stadium

Lineal world champions

- World Heavyweight Championship – James J. Braddock
- World Light Heavyweight Championship – John Henry Lewis
- World Middleweight Championship – vacant
- World Welterweight Championship – Barney Ross
- World Lightweight Championship – Tony Canzoneri → Lou Ambers
- World Featherweight Championship – vacant
- World Bantamweight Championship – Sixto Escobar → Tony Marino → Sixto Escobar
- World Flyweight Championship – vacant → Benny Lynch

== Cricket ==
Events

- Australia tours South Africa, winning the five-test series three tests to nil.

England

- County Championship – Derbyshire
- Minor Counties Championship – Hertfordshire
- Most runs – Patsy Hendren 2,654 @ 47.39 (HS 202)
- Most wickets – Hedley Verity 216 @ 13.18 (BB 9–12)
- India play a three-Test series of England, losing two and drawing one
- Wisden Cricketers of the Year – Charlie Barnett, Bill Copson, Alf Gover, Vijay Merchant, Stan Worthington

Australia

- Sheffield Shield – South Australia
- Most runs – Don Bradman 1,173 @ 130.33 (HS 369)
- Most wickets – Frank Ward 50 @ 20.94 (BB 6–47)

India

- Ranji Trophy – Bombay beat Madras by 190 runs
- Bombay Quadrangular – Hindus

New Zealand

- Plunket Shield – Wellington

South Africa

- Currie Cup – Western Province

West Indies

- Inter-Colonial Tournament – British Guiana

== Cycling ==
Tour de France

- Sylvère Maes wins the 30th Tour de France

Giro d'Italia

- Gino Bartali of Legnano wins the 24th Giro d'Italia

== Field Hockey ==
- Olympic Games (Men's Competition) in Berlin won by India

== Figure skating ==
- World Figure Skating Championships:
  - Men's singles: Karl Schäfer
  - Ladies' singles: Sonja Henie
  - Pairs: Maxi Herber and Ernst Baier
- 1936 Winter Olympics
  - Men's singles: Karl Schäfer
  - Ladies' singles: Sonja Henie
  - Pairs: Maxi Herber and Ernst Baier

== Golf ==
Men's professional

- Masters Tournament – Horton Smith
- U.S. Open – Tony Manero
- British Open – Alf Padgham
- PGA Championship – Denny Shute

Men's amateur

- British Amateur – Hector Thomson
- U.S. Amateur – Johnny Fischer

Women's professional

- Women's Western Open – Opal Hill

== Horse racing ==
- May 8 – jockey Ralph Neves was involved in a racing accident at Bay Meadows Racetrack in San Mateo, California and mistakenly pronounced dead. A while later, he woke up in the morgue and promptly returned to the racetrack but was not allowed to compete in any of the remaining races because of his "death".

Steeplechases

- Cheltenham Gold Cup – Golden Miller
- Grand National – Reynoldstown

Flat races

- Australia – Melbourne Cup won by Wotan
- Canada – King's Plate won by Monsweep
- France – Prix de l'Arc de Triomphe won by Corrida
- Ireland – Irish Derby Stakes won by Raeburn
- English Triple Crown Races:
  1. 2,000 Guineas Stakes – Pay Up
  2. The Derby – Mahmoud
  3. St. Leger Stakes – Boswell
- United States Triple Crown Races:
  1. Kentucky Derby – Bold Venture
  2. Preakness Stakes – Bold Venture
  3. Belmont Stakes – Granville

== Ice hockey ==
- The Detroit Red Wings win the Stanley Cup Championship 3 games to 1 over the Toronto Maple Leafs
  - Combining this with the Detroit Tigers World Series win and the Detroit Lions NFL Championship, in 1935, Detroit played home to the Championship teams in the MLB, NFL, and NHL in one 12-month period. This feat has yet to be duplicated by any other city.
- The first season of Czechoslovak Extraliga was held, which separated into Czech Extraliga and Tipsport Ice-hockey Liga of Slovakia from this league on 1993.

== Olympic Games ==
- The infamous 1936 Summer Olympics take place in Berlin
  - Germany wins the most medals (89) and the most gold medals (33)
  - Jesse Owens wins four athletics gold medals
  - The first torch relay takes place from Olympia, Greece
- 1936 Winter Olympics takes place in Garmisch-Partenkirchen, Germany
  - Norway wins the most medals (15) and the most gold medals (7)

== Rowing ==
The Boat Race

- 4 April — Cambridge wins the 88th Oxford and Cambridge Boat Race

== Rugby league ==
- 1936 Great Britain Lions tour
- 1935–36 European Rugby League Championship / 1936–37 European Rugby League Championship
- 1936 New Zealand rugby league season
- 1936 NSWRFL season
- 1936–37 Northern Rugby Football League season / 1935–36 Northern Rugby Football League season

== Rugby union ==
- 49th Home Nations Championship series is won by Wales

== Snooker ==
- World Snooker Championship – Joe Davis beats Horace Lindrum 34–27

== Speed skating ==
Events

- Inaugural World Allround Speed Skating Championships for Women is held in Stockholm

Speed Skating World Championships

- Men's All-round Champion – Ivar Ballangrud (Norway)
- Women's All-round Champion – Kit Klein (USA)

1936 Winter Olympics (Men)

- 500m – gold medal: Ivar Ballangrud (Norway)
- 1500m – gold medal: Charles Mathiesen (Norway)
- 5000m – gold medal: Ivar Ballangrud (Norway)
- 10000m – gold medal: Ivar Ballangrud (Norway)

1936 Winter Olympics (Women)

- not contested

== Tennis ==
Australia

- Australian Men's Singles Championship – Adrian Quist (Australia) defeats Jack Crawford (Australia) 6–2, 6–3, 4–6, 3–6, 9–7
- Australian Women's Singles Championship – Joan Hartigan Bathurst (Australia) defeats Nancye Wynne Bolton (Australia) 6–4, 6–4

England

- Wimbledon Men's Singles Championship – Fred Perry (Great Britain) defeats Gottfried von Cramm (Germany) 6–1, 6–1, 6–0
- Wimbledon Women's Singles Championship – Helen Jacobs (USA) defeats Hilde Krahwinkel Sperling (Denmark) 6–2, 4–6, 7–5

France

- French Men's Singles Championship – Gottfried von Cramm (Germany) defeats Fred Perry (Great Britain) 6–0, 2–6, 6–2, 2–6, 6–0
- French Women's Singles Championship – Hilde Krahwinkel Sperling (Germany) defeats Simonne Mathieu (France) 6–3, 6–4

USA

- American Men's Singles Championship – Fred Perry (Great Britain) defeats Don Budge (USA) 2–6, 6–2, 8–6, 1–6, 10–8
- American Women's Singles Championship – Alice Marble (USA) defeats Helen Jacobs (USA) 4–6, 6–3, 6–2

Davis Cup

- 1936 International Lawn Tennis Challenge – Great Britain at 3–2 Australia at Centre Court, Wimbledon (grass) London, United Kingdom

== Awards ==
- Associated Press Male Athlete of the Year – Jesse Owens, Track and field
- Associated Press Female Athlete of the Year – Helen Stephens, Track and field
