= Australia at the 1936 Winter Olympics =

- IOC code: AUS
- NOC: Australian Olympic Committee
- Website: www.olympics.com.au

in Garmisch-Partenkirchen
- Competitors: 1 in 1 sport
- Medals: Gold 0 Silver 0 Bronze 0 Total 0

Winter Olympics appearances (overview)
- 1936; 1948; 1952; 1956; 1960; 1964; 1968; 1972; 1976; 1980; 1984; 1988; 1992; 1994; 1998; 2002; 2006; 2010; 2014; 2018; 2022; 2026

Australia sent a delegation to compete at the 1936 Winter Olympics from 6 to 16 February 1936 in Garmisch-Partenkirchen, Germany. This was the nation's first appearance at a Winter Olympic Games since the competition began in 1924. Australia delegation consisted of one competitor. That was speed skater Kenneth Kennedy, who competed in three events in the speed skating competitions. He finished in 29th overall in the 500 meters and 33rd overall in the 1500 meters and the 5000 meters.

== Background ==
The Australian Olympic Committee was formed on 1 January 1895 with the nation making their debut at the first Olympics in Athens with Teddy Flack being the first representative of the nation. This was the nation's first appearance at a Winter Olympics and the ninth overall Olympics that Australia had sent a delegation in. The 1936 Winter Olympics was held at Garmisch-Partenkirchen in Germany and took place from the 6 to 16 February: a total of 646 athletes competed from 28 nations. The Australian delegation consist of a speed skater, Ken Kennedy who before the games had won the 880 yards and a mile national titles in speed skating over in Britain before competing for Australia at the 1936 Games.

== Speed skating ==
In what was his only Olympics, 22 year old Ken Kennedy competed in four speed skating events throughout the 1936 Games. His first event was in the men's 500 metres which took place on 11 February. He was a part of the 36 competitors that competed in the distance with Kennedy finishing 29th overall with a time of 47.4 seconds. His next event was the men's 1500 metres which took place the following day. From the 37 skaters that he entered, he finished in 33rd with a time of two minutes and 31 seconds, a full twelve seconds behind the eventual champion in Charles Mathiesen. On 13 February, he competed in his last event of the Games as he didn't start the 10000 metres event. From 39 entrants, Kennedy finished in 33rd place overall with a time of nine minutes and 48 seconds. He was almost one and a half minutes behind gold medallist, Ivar Ballangrud from Norway.

Event	Athlete	Race	
Event	Athlete	Time	Rank
Ken Kennedy	Men's 500 m	47.4	29
Ken Kennedy	Men's 1500 m	2:31.8	33
Ken Kennedy	Men's 5000 m	9:48.9	33
Ken Kennedy	Men's 10000 m	Did Not Start	
