= Japan at the 1936 Winter Olympics =

- IOC code: JPN
- NOC: Japanese Olympic Committee
- Website: www.joc.or.jp (in Japanese and English)

in Garmisch-Partenkirchen
- Competitors: 31 (30 men, 1 woman) in 7 sports
- Flag bearer: Kazuyoshi Oimatsu
- Medals: Gold 0 Silver 0 Bronze 0 Total 0

Winter Olympics appearances (overview)
- 1928; 1932; 1936; 1948; 1952; 1956; 1960; 1964; 1968; 1972; 1976; 1980; 1984; 1988; 1992; 1994; 1998; 2002; 2006; 2010; 2014; 2018; 2022; 2026

Japan competed at the 1936 Winter Olympics in Garmisch-Partenkirchen, Germany.

== Alpine skiing ==
Men

Athlete	Event	Downhill		Slalom			Total	
Athlete	Event	Time	Rank	Time 1	Time 2	Rank	Total points	Rank
Hiroshi Tadano	Combined	7:58.6	49	1:49.4	DSQ	–	DNF	–
Tsutomu Sekido	Combined	7:23.4	46	2:04.5	DSQ	–	DNF	–
Isamu Sekiguchi	Combined	6:48.6	41	1:52.5	DSQ	–	DNF	–

== Cross-country skiing ==
Men

Event	Athlete	Race	
Event	Athlete	Time	Rank
18 km	Hiroshi Tadano	1'35:28	59
18 km	Ginzo Yamada	1'33:17	56
18 km	Tsutomu Sekido	1'32:48	55
18 km	Shinzo Yamada	1'31:28	49
50 km	Tadao Okayama	4'30:28	34
50 km	Hiroshi Tadano	4'10:23	28

Men's 4 x 10 km relay

Athletes	Race	
Athletes	Time	Rank
Ginzo Yamada; Tsutomu Sekido; Shinzo Yamada; Hiroshi Tadano	3'10:59	12

== Figure skating ==
Men

Athlete	Event	CF	FS	Places	Points	Final rank
Tsugio Hasegawa	Men's singles	24	22	162	314.6	23
Zenjiro Watanabe	Men's singles	23	18	147	325.4	21
Kazuyoshi Oimatsu	Men's singles	20	19	139	325.4	20
Toshiichi Katayama	Men's singles	17	16	108	347.4	15

Women

Athlete	Event	CF	FS	Places	Points	Final rank
Etsuko Inada	Women's singles	13	9	77	368.1	10

== Ice hockey ==
=== Group D ===
Top two teams advanced to semifinals

	Pld	W	L	T	GF	GA	Pts
Great Britain	2	2	0	0	4	0	4
Sweden	2	1	1	0	2	1	2
Japan	2	0	2	0	0	5	0

7 February	Great Britain	3-0 (2-0,0-0,1-0)	Japan
8 February	Sweden	2-0 (1-0,1-0,0-0)	Japan

Contestants; Teiji Honma; Masahiro Hayama; Tatsuo Ichikawa; Shinkichi Kamei; Toshihiko Shoji; Susumu Hirano; Masatatsu Kitazawa; Kenichi Furuya; Kozue Kinoshita

== Nordic combined ==
Events:

- 18 km cross-country skiing
- normal hill ski jumping

The cross-country skiing part of this event was combined with the main medal event of cross-country skiing. Those results can be found above in this article in the cross-country skiing section. Some athletes (but not all) entered in both the cross-country skiing and Nordic combined event, their time on the 18 km was used for both events.

The ski jumping (normal hill) event was held separately from the main medal event of ski jumping, results can be found in the table below.

Athlete	Event	Cross-country			Ski Jumping				Total	
Athlete	Event	Time	Points	Rank	Distance 1	Distance 2	Total points	Rank	Points	Rank
Tsutomu Sekido	Individual	1'32:48	147.0	40	43.0	45.0	183.3	25	330.3	35
Isamu Sekiguchi	Individual	1'32:40	147.7	38	48.0	48.5	203.2	7	350.9	29
Shinzo Yamada	Individual	1'31:28	153.6	35	38.5	46.0	125.2	45	278.8	43

== Ski jumping ==
Athlete	Event	Jump 1			Jump 2			Total	
Athlete	Event	Distance	Points	Rank	Distance	Points	Rank	Points	Rank
Shinji Tatsuta	Normal hill	73.5	45.2	46	77.0	56.0	45	101.2	46
Iwao Miyajima	Normal hill	63.5	95.8	33	63.5	98.8	29	194.6	31
Masaji Iguro	Normal hill	74.5	107.6	11	72.5	110.6	6	218.2	7
Goro Adachi	Normal hill	73.0	109.4	7	71.0	41.4	46	150.8	45

== Speed skating ==
Men

Event	Athlete	Race	
Event	Athlete	Time	Rank
500 m	Kunio Nando	46.6	22
500 m	Seitoku Ri	45.9	16
500 m	Reikichi Nakamura	45.0	11
500 m	Shozo Ishihara	44.1	4
1500 m	Yasuo Kawamura	2:29.6	28
1500 m	Seitoku Ri	2:28.9	23
1500 m	Shozo Ishihara	2:26.7	19
1500 m	Seien Kin	2:25.0	15
5000 m	Kunio Nando	9:20.1	31
5000 m	Seitoku Ri	9:08.7	27
5000 m	Nichiko Cho	9:08.7	27
5000 m	Seien Kin	8:55.9	21
10,000 m	Nichiko Cho	19:00.1	26
10,000 m	Seitoku Ri	18:50.3	25
10,000 m	Seien Kin	18:02.7	13
