= Finland at the 1936 Winter Olympics =

- IOC code: FIN
- NOC: Finnish Olympic Committee
- Website: sport.fi/olympiakomitea (in Finnish and Swedish)

in Garmisch-Partenkirchen
- Competitors: 19 (men) in 5 sports
- Flag bearer: Sulo Nurmela
- Medals Ranked 4th: Gold 1 Silver 2 Bronze 3 Total 6

Winter Olympics appearances (overview)
- 1924; 1928; 1932; 1936; 1948; 1952; 1956; 1960; 1964; 1968; 1972; 1976; 1980; 1984; 1988; 1992; 1994; 1998; 2002; 2006; 2010; 2014; 2018; 2022; 2026

Finland competed at the 1936 Winter Olympics in Garmisch-Partenkirchen, Germany.

== Medalists ==
Medal	Name	Sport	Event
Gold	Kalle Jalkanen; Klaes Karppinen; Matti Lähde; Sulo Nurmela	Cross-country skiing	Men's 4 x 10 km relay
Silver	Birger Wasenius	Speed skating	Men's 5000m
Silver	Birger Wasenius	Speed skating	Men's 10,000m
Bronze	Pekka Niemi	Cross-country skiing	Men's 18 km
Bronze	Birger Wasenius	Speed skating	Men's 1500m
Bronze	Antero Ojala	Speed skating	Men's 5000m

== Cross-country skiing ==
Men

Event	Athlete	Race	
Event	Athlete	Time	Rank
18 km	Matti Lähde	1'20:21	15
18 km	Kalle Jalkanen	1'19:27	12
18 km	Sulo Nurmela	1'18:20	7
18 km	Pekka Niemi	1'16:59	3rd place, bronze medalist(s)
50 km	Kalle Heikkinen	3'54:25	14
50 km	Pekka Niemi	3'44:14	8
50 km	Frans Heikkinen	3'42:44	7
50 km	Klaes Karppinen	3'39:33	5

Men's 4 x 10 km relay

Athletes	Race	
Athletes	Time	Rank
Sulo Nurmela; Klaes Karppinen; Matti Lähde; Kalle Jalkanen	2'41:33	1st place, gold medalist(s)

== Figure skating ==
Men

Athlete	Event	CF	FS	Places	Points	Final rank
Marcus Nikkanen	Men's singles	6	9	54	380.7	7

== Nordic combined ==
Events:

- 18 km cross-country skiing
- normal hill ski jumping

The cross-country skiing part of this event was combined with the main medal event of cross-country skiing. Those results can be found above in this article in the cross-country skiing section. Some athletes (but not all) entered in both the cross-country skiing and Nordic combined event, their time on the 18 km was used for both events.

The ski jumping (normal hill) event was held separate from the main medal event of ski jumping, results can be found in the table below.

Athlete	Event	Cross-country			Ski Jumping				Total	
Athlete	Event	Time	Points	Rank	Distance 1	Distance 2	Total points	Rank	Points	Rank
Lauri Valonen	Individual	1'26:34	178.6	26	52.0	54.5	222.6	1	401.2	4
Pertti Mattila	Individual	1'26:21	179.7	25	45.0	47.0	188.7	21	368.4	19
Timo Murama	Individual	1'24:52	187.5	13	49.0	48.0	205.8	5	393.3	7
Niilo Nikunen	Individual	1'23:59	192.2	9	47.5	45.5	191.6	15	383.8	10

== Ski jumping ==
Athlete	Event	Jump 1			Jump 2			Total	
Athlete	Event	Distance	Points	Rank	Distance	Points	Rank	Points	Rank
Sauli Pälli	Normal hill	71.0	42.7	47	68.5	37.6	47	80.3	47
Timo Murama	Normal hill	71.0	100.9	22	70.0	101.3	21	202.2	24
Väinö Tiihonen	Normal hill	71.5	108.0	9	70.0	107.3	7	215.3	9
Lauri Valonen	Normal hill	73.5	113.2	5	67.0	106.2	11	219.4	6

== Speed skating ==
Men

Event	Athlete	Race	
Event	Athlete	Time	Rank
500 m	Ossi Blomqvist	46.2	19
500 m	Birger Wasenius	44.9	8
500 m	Jorma Ruissalo	44.9	8
500 m	Antero Ojala	44.9	8
1500 m	Åke Ekman	2:27.2	20
1500 m	Antero Ojala	2:23.2	9
1500 m	Ossi Blomqvist	2:23.2	9
1500 m	Birger Wasenius	2:20.9	3rd place, bronze medalist(s)
5000 m	Åke Ekman	9:00.4	22
5000 m	Ossi Blomqvist	8:36.6	6
5000 m	Antero Ojala	8:30.1	3rd place, bronze medalist(s)
5000 m	Birger Wasenius	8:23.3	2nd place, silver medalist(s)
10,000 m	Antero Ojala	17:46.6	7
10,000 m	Ossi Blomqvist	17:42.4	5
10,000 m	Birger Wasenius	17:28.2	2nd place, silver medalist(s)
