= Estonia at the 1936 Winter Olympics =

- IOC code: EST
- NOC: Estonian Olympic Committee
- Website: www.eok.ee (in Estonian)

in Garmisch-Partenkirchen
- Competitors: 5 (3 men, 2 women) in 4 sports
- Flag bearer: Johannes Raudava
- Medals: Gold 0 Silver 0 Bronze 0 Total 0

Winter Olympics appearances (overview)
- 1928; 1932; 1936; 1948–1988; 1992; 1994; 1998; 2002; 2006; 2010; 2014; 2018; 2022; 2026

Other related appearances
- Soviet Union (1956–1988)

Estonia participated at the 1936 Winter Olympics in Garmisch-Partenkirchen, Germany, held between 6 and 16 February 1936. The country's participation in the Games marked its second appearance at the Winter Olympics since its debut in the 1928 Games. The nation returned to the Winter Games after missing the 1932 Winter Olympics. These Games would be the last time that Estonia would compete at the Winter Games as an independent nation until the 1992 Winter Olympics.

The Estonian team consisted of five athletes including two women who competed across four sports. Skater Norbert Felsinger was the country's flag-bearer during the opening ceremony. The team did not win any medals, and as of this edition, Estonia had not won any Winter Games medal.

== Background ==
Estonian athletes were members of the Russian delegation since the 1912 Olympic Games. The Estonian Sports Federation formed the Estonian Olympic Committee in 1919, and Estonia competed as an independent country for the first time in the 1920 Summer Olympics. At the 1924 Winter Olympics, the country was represented at the opening ceremony, but no athletes competed. The country made its official Winter Olympics debut in 1928 at St.Moritz. The country returned to the Winter Games in 1936, after missing the 1932 Winter Olympics, which marked the Estonia's second appearance at the Winter Games. These Games would be the last time that Estonia would compete at the Winter Games as an independent country until 1992. After the country was occupied by the Soviet Union in 1940, Estonian athletes would compete at the Olympic Games as part of the Soviet delegations until 1988. The Estonian Olympic Committee, which ceased to exist during the Soviet occupation, was re-established in 1989 and approved by the International Olympic Committee in November 1991.

The 1936 Winter Olympics were held in Garmisch-Partenkirchen, Germany between 6 and 16 February 1936. The Estonian delegation consisted of five athletes competing across four sports. The delegation was led by Johannes Raudava, who also served as the country's flag-bearer in the Parade of Nations during the opening ceremony.

== Competitors ==
There were five athletes including two women who took part in the medal events across four sports.

Sport	Men	Women	Athletes
Alpine skiing	0	1	1
Cross-country skiing	1	0	1
Figure skating	1	1	2
Speed skating	1	0	1
Total	3	2	5

== Alpine skiing ==
Alpine skiing competitions for women were held on 7 and 8 February at Kreuzeck-Gebiet. Karin Peckert-Forsman was the lone athlete representing the nation, and she finished in 26th place in the final classification.

Athlete	Event	Downhill			Slalom					Total	
Athlete	Event	Time	Points	Rank	Time 1	Time 2	Total	Points	Rank	Total points	Rank
Karin Peckert-Forsman	Women's combined	7:58.4	63.63	31	2:00.4	1:52.6	3:53.0	60.99	21	62.31	26

== Cross-country skiing ==
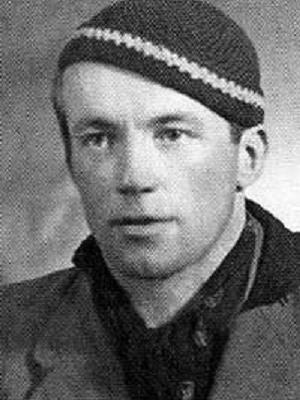
Vello Kaaristo during the Games

Cross-country skiing competitions for men were held between 12 and 15 February at Olympia-Skistadion. Vello Kaaristo was the lone athlete representing Estonia. He finished outside the medal places in both the events he competed.

Athlete	Event	Race	
Athlete	Event	Time	Rank
Vello Kaaristo	Men's 18 km	1:25:11	30
Vello Kaaristo	Men's 50 km	4:02:52	23

== Figure skating ==
Figure skating competitions for men were held on 13 February at Olympia-Kunsteisstadion. Helene Michelson and Eduard Hiiop were classified 18th in the final result in the mixed pairs competition.

Athlete(s)	Event	CF	FS	TO	Points	Rank
Helene Michelson; Eduard Hiiop	Pairs	18	—N/a	161	60.9	18

== Speed skating ==
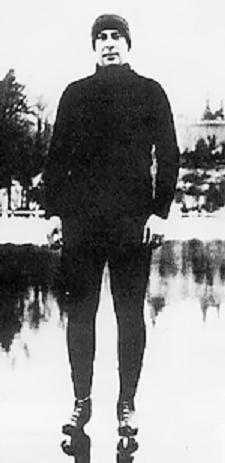
Aleksander Mitt at the Games

Speed skating competitions for men were held at Olympia-Eissportplatz am Rießersee. Aleksander Mitt competed in four events in the men's category. He was classified 22nd in three of the events and failed to complete the last event.

Athlete	Event	Final	
Athlete	Event	Time	Rank
Aleksander Mitt	500 m	46.6	22
Aleksander Mitt	1500 m	2:27.8	22
Aleksander Mitt	5000 m	9:00.4	22
Aleksander Mitt	10000 m	Did not finish	
