= Netherlands at the 1936 Winter Olympics =

- Flag of the Netherlands
- IOC code: NED
- NOC: Dutch Olympic Committee

in Garmisch-Partenkirchen
- Competitors: 8 (7 men, 1 women) in 3 sports
- Flag bearer: Sam Dunlop (bobsleigh)
- Medals: Gold 0 Silver 0 Bronze 0 Total 0

Winter Olympics appearances (overview)
- 1928; 1932; 1936; 1948; 1952; 1956; 1960; 1964; 1968; 1972; 1976; 1980; 1984; 1988; 1992; 1994; 1998; 2002; 2006; 2010; 2014; 2018; 2022; 2026

Athletes from the Netherlands competed at the 1936 Winter Olympics in Garmisch-Partenkirchen, Germany.

== Alpine skiing ==
Women

Athlete	Event	Downhill		Slalom			Total	
Athlete	Event	Time	Rank	Time 1	Time 2	Rank	Total points	Rank
Gratia Schimmelpenninck van der Oye	Combined	6:09.8	13	1:26.5	1:59.9 (+0:06)	13	76.09	14

== Bobsleigh ==
Men

Event	Athlete	Run 1		Run 2		Run 3		Run 4		Total	
Event	Athlete	Time	Rank	Time	Rank	Time	Rank	Time	Rank	Time	Rank
Two-man	Willem Gevers; Samuel Dunlop	1:31.41	15	1:24.99	10	1:25.71	4	1:26.00	12	5:48.11	10

== Speed skating ==
Men

Event	Athlete	Race	
Event	Athlete	Time	Rank
500 m	Ben Blaisse	46.9	27
500 m	Lou Dijkstra	46.7	24
500 m	Jan Langedijk	46.7	24
500 m	Dolf van der Scheer	45.7	14
1500 m	Lou Dijkstra	2:27.2	20
1500 m	Roelof Koops	2:30.0	30
1500 m	Jan Langedijk	2:24.6	14
1500 m	Dolf van der Scheer	2:23.2	9
5000 m	Lou Dijkstra	8:51.5	16
5000 m	Roelof Koops	8:48.5	13
5000 m	Jan Langedijk	8:32.0	4
5000 m	Dolf van der Scheer	8:43.3	10
10,000 m	Lou Dijkstra	18:23.6	20
10,000 m	Roelof Koops	18:11.5	17
10,000 m	Jan Langedijk	17:43.7	6
10,000 m	Dolf van der Scheer	18:04.9	16
