= Freisinger =

Freisinger may refer to:

- Freisinger Motorsport, a German auto racing team

== People with the surname ==
- Leo Freisinger (1916–1985), American speed skater
