= Franz Ortner =

Austrian speed skater (1905–1973)

Personal information
- Full name: Franz Koloman Ortner
- Nationality: Austrian
- Born: 12 November 1905; Vienna, Austria-Hungary
- Died: 14 April 1973 (aged 67); Korneuburg, Austria

Sport
- Sport: Speed skating

Franz Ortner (12 November 1905 – 14 April 1973) was an Austrian speed skater. He competed in the men's 10,000 metres at the 1936 Winter Olympics.
