= Jan Langedijk =

Dutch speed skater

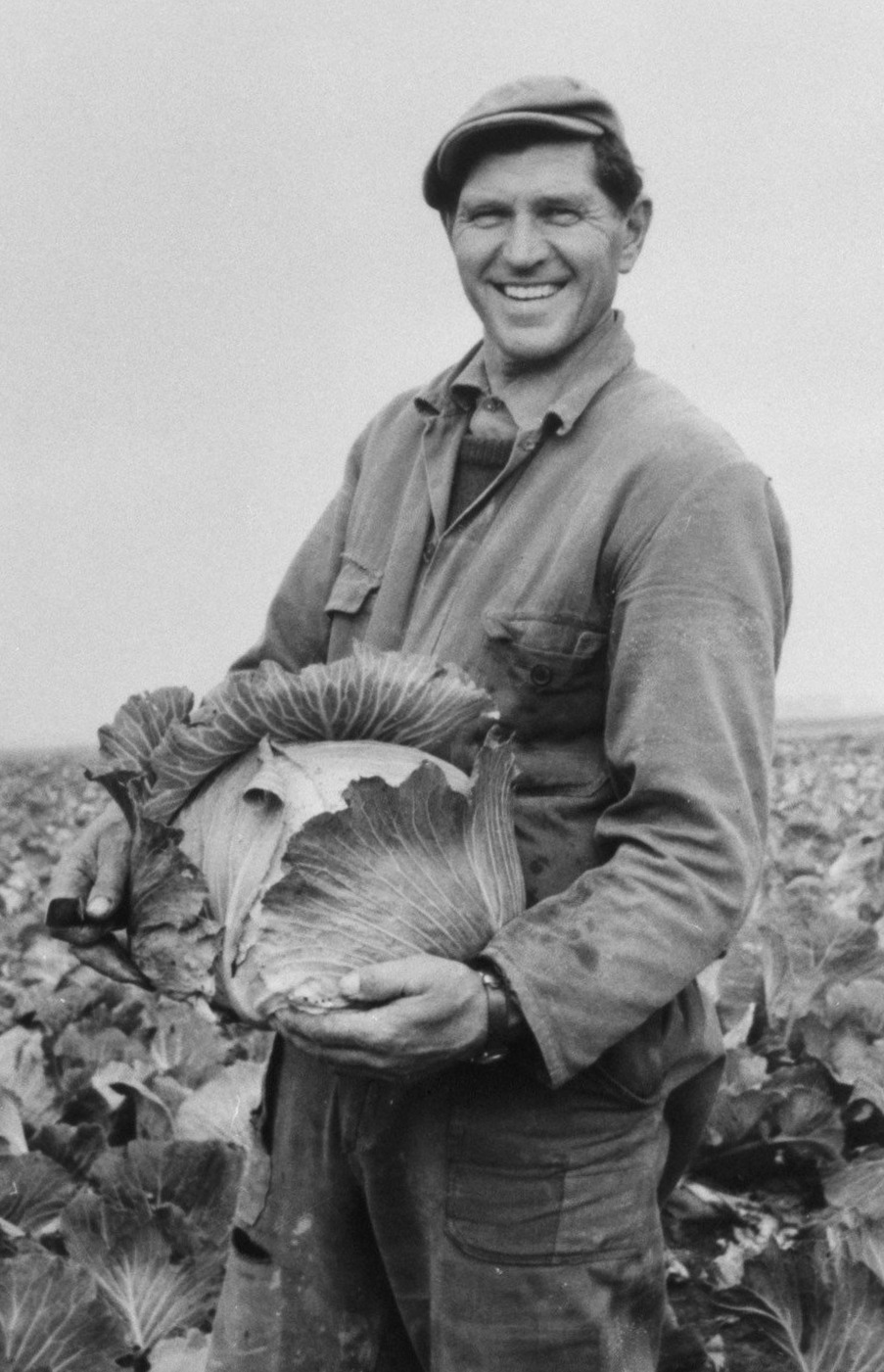
- Langedijk working on his farm ca. 1965

Personal information
- Born: 27 July 1910 Oudkarspel, the Netherlands
- Died: 3 December 1981 (aged 71) Beemster, the Netherlands

Sport
- Country: Netherlands
- Sport: Speed skating

Achievements and titles
- Personal bests: 500 m – 45.0 (1938); 1500 m – 2:20.1 (1939); 5000 m – 8:24.2 (1949); 10000 m – 17:28.2 (1938)

Jan Langedijk (27 July 1910 – 3 December 1981) was a Dutch speed skater who competed at the 1936 and 1948 Winter Olympics. In 1936 he finished 24th in the 500 m, 14th in the 1500 m, fourth in the 5000 m and sixth in the 10,000 m event. Twelve years later he placed 29th in the 500 m, 13th in the 1500 m, fifth in the 5000 m and sixth in the 10,000 m events. Domestically he won the Dutch allround titles in 1940 and 1947.

Olympic Games
Preceded by Sam Dunlop	Flagbearer for Netherlands; St. Moritz 1948	Succeeded by Wim van der Voort
