= Robert Petersen (speed skater) =

American speed skater (1914–2000)

Robert Grover Petersen (September 2, 1914 – October 1, 2000) was an American speed skater who competed in the 1936 Winter Olympics..

In 1936 he finished eleventh in the 500 metres event as well as eleventh in the 5000 metres competition, and 17th in the 1500 metres event. He also participated in the 10000 metres competition but did not finish.
