= Norway at the 1936 Winter Olympics =

- IOC code: NOR
- NOC: Norwegian National Federation of Sports

in Garmisch-Partenkirchen
- Competitors: 31 (25 men, 6 women) in 6 sports
- Flag bearer: Ivar Ballangrud (speed skating)
- Medals Ranked 1st: Gold 7 Silver 5 Bronze 3 Total 15

Winter Olympics appearances (overview)
- 1924; 1928; 1932; 1936; 1948; 1952; 1956; 1960; 1964; 1968; 1972; 1976; 1980; 1984; 1988; 1992; 1994; 1998; 2002; 2006; 2010; 2014; 2018; 2022; 2026

Norway competed at the 1936 Winter Olympics in Garmisch-Partenkirchen, Germany.

== Medalists ==
Medal	Name	Sport	Event
Gold	Sonja Henie	Figure skating	Women's singles
Gold	Oddbjørn Hagen	Nordic combined	Men's individual
Gold	Birger Ruud	Ski jumping	Men's normal hill
Gold	Ivar Ballangrud	Speed skating	Men's 500m
Gold	Charles Mathiesen	Speed skating	Men's 1500m
Gold	Ivar Ballangrud	Speed skating	Men's 5000m
Gold	Ivar Ballangrud	Speed skating	Men's 10,000m
Silver	Oddbjørn Hagen	Cross-country skiing	Men's 18 km
Silver	Oddbjørn Hagen; Olaf Hoffsbakken; Sverre Brodahl; Bjarne Iversen	Cross-country skiing	Men's 4 x 10 km relay
Silver	Olaf Hoffsbakken	Nordic combined	Men's individual
Silver	Georg Krog	Speed skating	Men's 500m
Silver	Ivar Ballangrud	Speed skating	Men's 1500m
Bronze	Laila Schou Nilsen	Alpine skiing	Women's combined
Bronze	Sverre Brodahl	Nordic combined	Men's individual
Bronze	Reidar Andersen	Ski jumping	Men's normal hill

== Alpine skiing ==
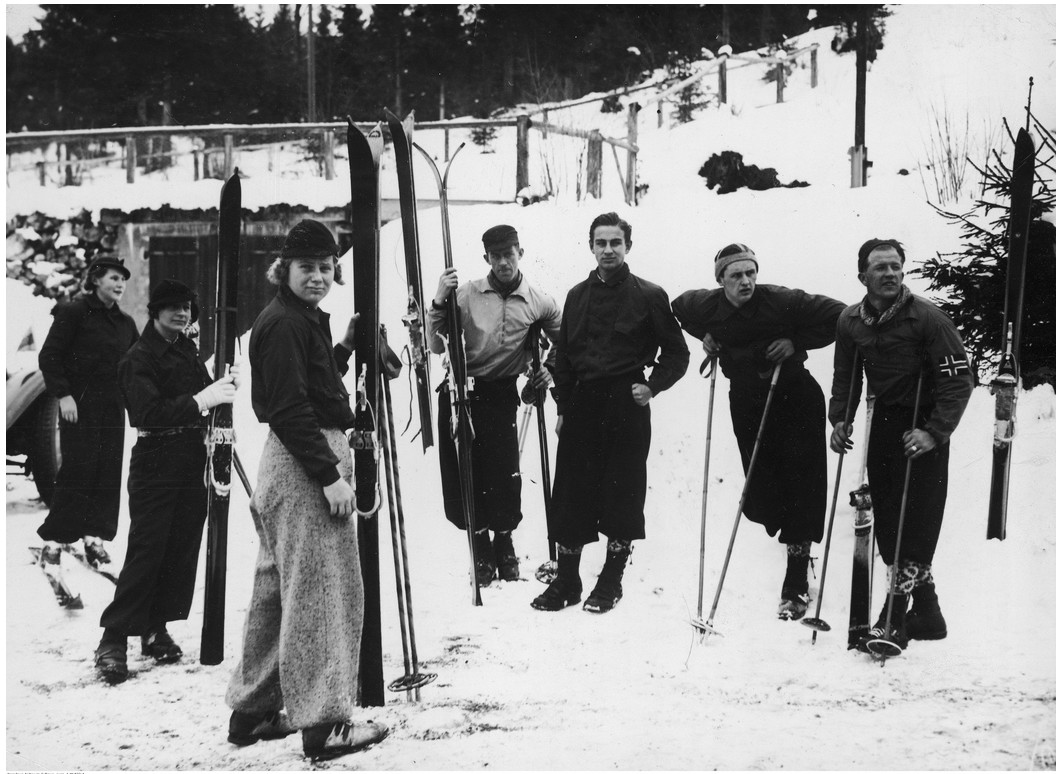
The Norwegian team for the alpine combination.

Men

Athlete	Event	Downhill		Slalom			Total	
Athlete	Event	Time	Rank	Time 1	Time 2	Rank	Total points	Rank
Sigmund Ruud	Combined	5:11.6	10	DNS	–	–	DNF	–
Per Fossum	Combined	5:03.2	7	1:30.3	1:29.7	15	88.12	9
Alf Konningen	Combined	5:00.4	5	1:29.3	1:24.3	9	90.06	8
Birger Ruud	Combined	4:47.4	1	1:31.9 (+0:06)	1:17.1	6	93.38	4

Women

Athlete	Event	Downhill		Slalom			Total	
Athlete	Event	Time	Rank	Time 1	Time 2	Rank	Total points	Rank
Nora Strømstad	Combined	5:57.4	11	1:34.2	1:51.1 (+0:06)	14	77.20	11
Johanne Dybwad	Combined	5:32.0	8	1:26.5 (+0:06)	1:30.9	7	85.90	7
Laila Schou Nilsen	Combined	5:04.4	1	1:26.1 (+0:06)	1:17.3	5	93.48	3rd place, bronze medalist(s)

== Cross-country skiing ==
Men

Event	Athlete	Race	
Event	Athlete	Time	Rank
18 km	Bjarne Iversen	1'18:56	9
18 km	Arne Rustadstuen	1'18:13	6
18 km	Olaf Hoffsbakken	1'17:37	5
18 km	Oddbjørn Hagen	1'15:33	2nd place, silver medalist(s)
50 km	Per Samuelshaug	DNF	–
50 km	Kåre Hatten	3'50:37	12
50 km	Trygve Brodahl	3'50:14	11
50 km	Arne Tuft	3'41:18	6

Men's 4 x 10 km relay

Athletes	Race	
Athletes	Time	Rank
Oddbjørn Hagen; Olaf Hoffsbakken; Sverre Brodahl; Bjarne Iversen	2'41:39	2nd place, silver medalist(s)

== Figure skating ==
Women

Athlete	Event	CF	FS	Places	Points	Final rank
Nanna Egedius	Women's singles	DNS	–	–	–	–
Sonja Henie	Women's singles	1	1	7.5	424.5	1st place, gold medalist(s)

Pairs

Athletes	Points	Score	Final rank
Randi Bakke; Christen Christensen	132.5	8.2	15

== Nordic combined ==
Events:

- 18 km cross-country skiing
- normal hill ski jumping

The cross-country skiing part of this event was combined with the main medal event of cross-country skiing. Those results can be found above in this article in the cross-country skiing section. Some athletes (but not all) entered in both the cross-country skiing and Nordic combined event, their time on the 18 km was used for both events.

The ski jumping (normal hill) event was held separate from the main medal event of ski jumping, results can be found in the table below.

Athlete	Event	Cross-country			Ski Jumping				Total	
Athlete	Event	Time	Points	Rank	Distance 1	Distance 2	Total points	Rank	Points	Rank
Bernt Østerkløft	Individual	1'21:37	205.1	6	44.0	48.0	188.7	21	393.8	6
Sverre Brodahl	Individual	1'18:01	225.5	3	40.0	47.0	182.6	28	408.1	3rd place, bronze medalist(s)
Olaf Hoffsbakken	Individual	1'17:37	227.8	2	47.0	45.5	192.0	13	419.8	2nd place, silver medalist(s)
Oddbjørn Hagen	Individual	1'15:33	240.0	1	42.0	46.0	190.3	16	430.3	1st place, gold medalist(s)

== Ski jumping ==
Athlete	Event	Jump 1			Jump 2			Total	
Athlete	Event	Distance	Points	Rank	Distance	Points	Rank	Points	Rank
Arnholdt Kongsgård	Normal hill	74.5	111.6	6	66.0	106.1	12	217.7	8
Reidar Andersen	Normal hill	74.0	113.5	4	75.0	115.4	2	228.9	3rd place, bronze medalist(s)
Kåre Walberg	Normal hill	73.5	113.7	3	72.0	113.3	4	227.0	4
Birger Ruud	Normal hill	75.0	114.9	2	74.5	117.1	1	232.0	1st place, gold medalist(s)

== Speed skating ==
Men

Event	Athlete	Race	
Event	Athlete	Time	Rank
500 m	Hans Engnestangen	DNF	–
500 m	Harry Haraldsen	54.9	34
500 m	Georg Krog	43.5	2nd place, silver medalist(s)
500 m	Ivar Ballangrud	43.4 OR	1st place, gold medalist(s)
1500 m	Hans Engnestangen	2:23.0	8
1500 m	Harry Haraldsen	2:22.4	7
1500 m	Ivar Ballangrud	2:20.2	2nd place, silver medalist(s)
1500 m	Charles Mathiesen	2:19.2 OR	1st place, gold medalist(s)
5000 m	Edvard Wangberg	8:54.7	20
5000 m	Michael Staksrud	8:38.5	9
5000 m	Charles Mathiesen	8:36.9	7
5000 m	Ivar Ballangrud	8:19.6 OR	1st place, gold medalist(s)
10,000 m	Edvard Wangberg	18:15.8	18
10,000 m	Michael Staksrud	17:56.7	10
10,000 m	Charles Mathiesen	17:41.2	4
10,000 m	Ivar Ballangrud	17:24.3 OR	1st place, gold medalist(s)
