= Axel Johansson (speed skater) =

Swedish speed skater (1910–1983)

Axel Allan Johansson (May 23, 1910 – May 20, 1983) was a Swedish speed skater who competed in the Olympic Games in 1936 in Garmisch-Partenkirchen.

In 1936 he finished 18th in the 500 metres competition, 22nd in the 10000 metres event, 26th in the 5000 metres competition, and 29th in the 1500 metres event.
