= Paul Graeffe =

Belgian bobsledder

Paul Graeffe (11 April 1897 in Forest – 11 March 1954 in Saint-Gilles) was a Belgian bobsledder who competed in the 1930s. He finished fifth in the four-man event at the 1936 Winter Olympics in Garmisch-Partenkirchen.

He is the father of speed skater James Graeffe who also competed at the 1936 Winter Olympics.
