= Karl Wazulek =

Austrian speed skater

Karl Wazulek (December 13, 1914 – March 10, 1958) was an Austrian speed skater who competed in the 1936 Winter Olympics. He finished sixth in the 1500 metres competition, eighth in the 5000 metres event, eleventh in the 10000 metres competition, and 13th in the 500 metres event.
