= Eddie Schroeder =

American speed skater

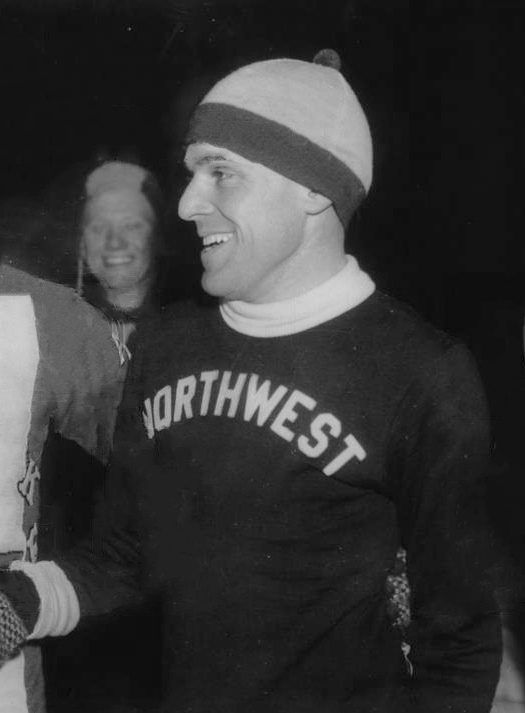
- Schroeder in 1938

Personal information
- Full name: Edward Julius Schroeder
- Born: January 20, 1911
- Died: December 1, 2005 (aged 94)
- Monument: United States
- Years active: 1932–1936

Sport
- Country: United States
- Sport: Speed skating
- Club: Northwest Skating Club
- Team: US Olympic Team

Achievements and titles
- Olympic finals: 1932, 1936
- Personal bests: 500 m – 44.4 (1936); 1500 m – 2:21.0 (1933); 5000 m – 8:29.8 (1933); 10000 m – 17:27.9 (1933)
Medal record
Representing the United States
World championships
| Bronze medal – third place | 1936 Davos | All-around |

Edward "Eddie" Julius Schroeder (January 20, 1911 – December 1, 2005) was an American speed skater who competed at the 1932 and 1936 Winter Olympics. In 1932 he finished eighth in the 10,000 m event. Four years later he again finished eighth in the 10000 m; he also placed 12th over 1500 m and 15th over 5000 m. He was selected for the 1940 Olympic team, but the games were canceled due to World War II.

Schroeder attended Tilden High School in Chicago, and won the North American all-around title in 1934. At the world championships, he won the 10000 m event in 1933, placing third in the 5000 m. He also placed second over 5000 m in 1932 and 1936, and won the all-around bronze medal in 1936. After retiring from competitions he worked as a skating coach and prepared the national team for the 1960 Winter Olympics. He was inducted into the National Speed Skating Hall of Fame in 1968, and served as a Winter Olympics torch bearer in 1996 and 2002.
