= Karl Leban =

Austrian sportsman

- Leban in 1930

Personal information
- Born: 27 November 1908 Goracdo, Austria
- Died: 28 July 1941 (aged 32) Vinnytsia, Ukraine

Sport
- Sport: Modern pentathlon, athletics, speed skating

Achievements and titles
- Personal best(s): SK: 500 m – 44.3 (1937); 1500 m – 2:21.5 (1933); 5000 m – 8:43.2 (1933); 10,000 m – 18:45.2 (1932)

Karl Leban (27 November 1908 – 28 July 1941) was an Austrian speed skater and modern pentathlete who competed in the 1936 Winter Olympics and in the 1936 Summer Olympics. At the Winter Games he finished sixth in the 500 m and twelfth in the 1500 m event. At the Summer Games he placed 26th in the modern pentathlon. Leban finished fourth allround at the 1932 European Speed Skating Championships. Domestically he won athletics titles in the 5000 m (1930 and 1934), 4 × 1500 m relay (1932 and 1937) and 1500 m (1937). He died during World War II when his fighter plane crashed in Ukraine.
