= Max Stiepl =

Austrian speed skater

Olympic medal record

Men's Speed skating
Bronze medal – third place	1936 Garmisch-P.	10000 m

Maximilian Stiepl (March 23, 1914 – August 27, 1992) was an Austrian speed skater who competed in the 1936 Winter Olympics and in the 1948 Winter Olympics.

In 1936 he won the bronze medal in the 10000 metres competition. In the 1500 metres event as well as in the 5000 metres competition he finished fifth.

Twelve years later he finished tenth in the 10000 meters event, 24th in the 5000 meters competition and 38th in the 1500 meters event.

== World record ==
Discipline	Time	Date	Location
5000 m	8.18,9	February 3, 1934	(Norway) Hamar

Source: SpeedSkatingStats.com

Records
Preceded by (Netherlands) Siem Heiden	Men's 5000 m World Record Holder; February 3, 1934 – January 18, 1936	Succeeded by (Norway) Ivar Ballangrud
