= Dolph van der Scheer =

Dutch speed skater

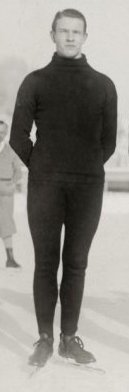
- Dolph van der Scheer

Personal information
- Born: April 18, 1909 Zutphen, Netherlands
- Died: 31 August 1966 (aged 57) Netherlands

Sport
- Country: Netherlands
- Sport: Speed skating

Achievements and titles
- Personal best: 1936 Winter Olympics
Medal record
Men's speed skating
Representing the Netherlands
World Championships
| Bronze medal – third place | 1930 Oslo | Allround |
European Championships
| Bronze medal – third place | 1931 Stockholm | Allround |

Adolph "Dolph" Frederik van der Scheer (18 April 1909 – 31 August 1966) was a Dutch speed skater who competed in the 1936 Winter Olympics. He was born in Zutphen. In 1936 he finished ninth in the 1500 metres event, tenth in the 5000 metres competition, 14th in the 500 metres event, and 16th in the 10000 metres competition.
