= Wilhelm Löwinger =

Austrian speed skater

Personal information
- Nationality: Austrian
- Born: 18 May 1916; Vienna, Austria-Hungary
- Died: 18 January 2013 (aged 96); Vienna, Austria

Sport
- Sport: Speed skating

Wilhelm Löwinger (18 May 1916 – 18 January 2013) was an Austrian speed skater. He competed in two events at the 1936 Winter Olympics.
