= Ben Blaisse =

Dutch speed skater

Berndt Stephan "Ben" Blaisse (8 May 1911, Amsterdam – 30 April 2006, The Hague) was a Dutch speed skater and physicist.

He became a professor at the Delft University of Technology. He was expert in the field of physics at extremely low temperatures.

He made his international competitive debut in 1932 in the European Speed Skating Championships. In 1936 he qualified at the selection trials in Davos for the Olympics in Garmisch-Partenkirchen. He competed on the 500 meter distance and earned a 27th place with a time of 46.9 seconds.

He was the uncle of rower Steven Blaisse, who won a silver medal at the 1964 Summer Olympics.

== Sources ==
- Evans, Hilary; Gjerde, Arild; Heijmans, Jeroen; Mallon, Bill; et al. "Ben Blaisse". Olympics at Sports-Reference.com. Sports Reference LLC. Archived from the original on 2016-12-02.
- Ben Blaisse overleden, Zen en de kunst van het schaatsenrijden (in Dutch)
