= Hiroshi Tadano =

Japanese alpine and cross-country skier

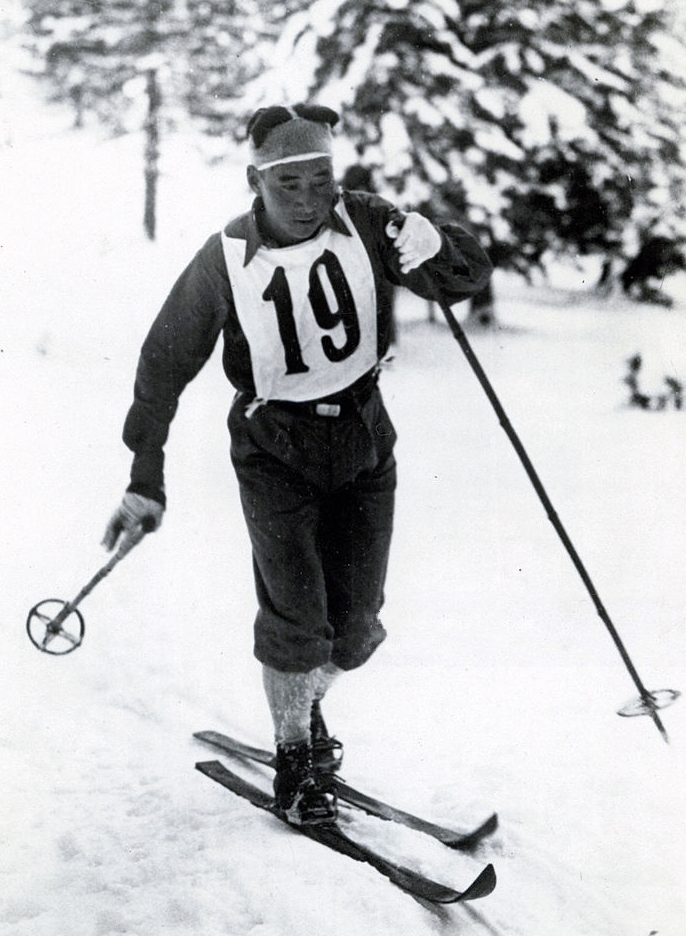
- Hiroshi Tadano at the 1936 Olympics

Personal information
- Born: January 29, 1914 Asahikawa, Hokkaido, Japan
- Died: September 6, 1986 (aged 72)

Sport
- Sport: Skiing
- Club: Sapporo Railway Administration

Hiroshi Tadano (但野 寛, Tadano Hiroshi; January 29, 1914 – September 6, 1986) was a Japanese alpine and cross-country skier. He competed at the 1936 Winter Olympics in the alpine skiing combined event, but failed to complete it. At the same Olympics he finished 28th in the 50 km cross-country competition and 59th in the 18 km cross-country event. As a member of the Japanese team he finished twelfth in the first ever held cross-country relay contest.
