= Ginzo Yamada =

Japanese cross-country skier (1915–1978)

Personal information
- Nationality: Japanese
- Born: 8 July 1915; Aomori, Japan
- Died: 25 December 1978 (aged 63)

Sport
- Sport: Cross-country skiing

Ginzo Yamada (山田 銀蔵, Yamada Ginzō, 8 July 1915 – 25 December 1978) was a Japanese cross-country skier. He competed at the 1936 Winter Olympics in Garmisch-Partenkirchen finishing 56th in the men's 18 kilometre event and 12th in the 4 × 10-kilometre relay.
