= Harry Haraldsen =

Norwegian speed skater and cyclist

Harry Haraldsen (19 November 1911, Rjukan – 28 May 1966) was a Norwegian speed skater who competed in the 1936 Winter Olympics. In 1936 he finished seventh in the 1500 metres competition and 34th in the 500 metres event.

He was also a cyclist and competed in the 1000m time trial at the 1936 Summer Olympics.
