= Reikichi Nakamura =

Japanese speed skater (born 1916)

Reikichi Nakamura 中村 礼吉
- Born: 16 October 1916; Japan
- Occupation: speed skater
- Years active: 1936-present

Reikichi Nakamura (Japanese: 中村 礼吉; born 16 October 1916, date of death unknown) was a Japanese speed skater who competed in the 1936 Winter Olympics. In 1936 he finished eleventh in the 500 metres competition. Nakamura is deceased.
