= Tsutomu Sekido =

Japanese skier (1915–1987)

Personal information
- Native name: 関戸 力
- Died: November 23, 1987 (aged 72)

Sport
- Sport: Skiing

Tsutomu Sekido (関戸 力, Sekido Tsutomu; March 25, 1915 – November 23, 1987) was a Japanese alpine, cross-country, and Nordic combined skier who competed in the 1936 Winter Olympics.

In 1936 he participated in the alpine skiing combined event. He finished 46th in the downhill race, in the slalom he was not allowed to start in the second run. At the same Olympics he finished 55th in the 18 km cross-country competition. As a member of the Japanese team he finished twelfth in the first ever held cross-country relay contest. In the Nordic combined event he finished 35th.
