= Lou Dijkstra =

Dutch speed skater (1909–1964)

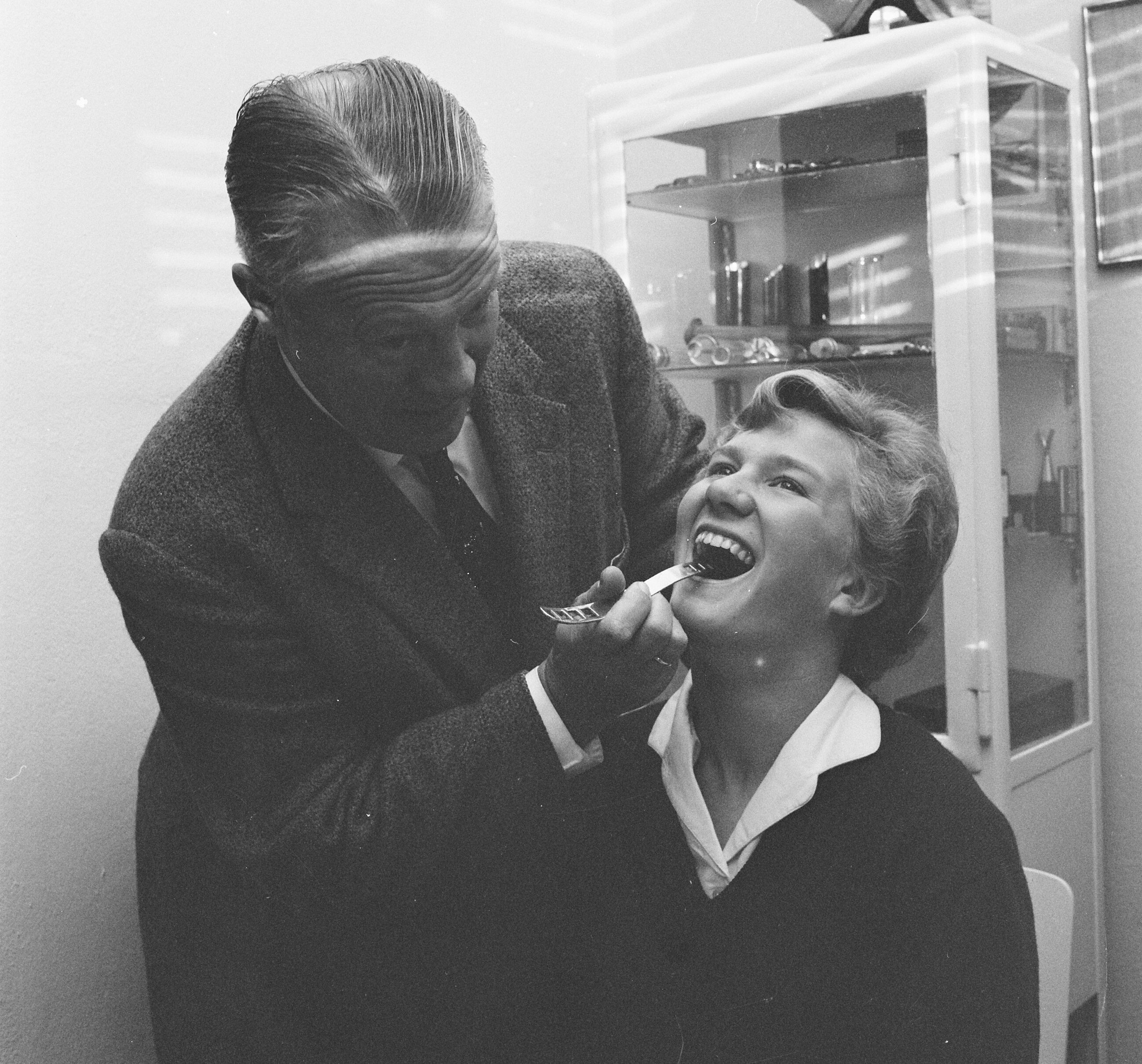
- Lou Dijkstra and his daughter Sjoukje

Personal information
- Born: 7 May 1909 Paesens, Netherlands
- Died: 24 April 1964 (aged 54) Netherlands

Sport
- Country: Netherlands
- Sport: Speed skating

Luitzen "Lou" Dijkstra (7 May 1909 – 24 April 1964) was a Dutch speed skater who competed in the 1936 Winter Olympics.

He was born in Paesens, Friesland.

In 1936 he finished 16th in the 5000 metres event, 20th in the 1500 metres competition, as well as 20th in the 10000 metres event, and 24th in the 500 metres competition.

Dijkstra was the father of Sjoukje Dijkstra, a figure skater who won a gold medal in the 1964 Winter Olympics.
