= Georg Krog (speed skater) =

Norwegian speed skater (1915–1991)

Medal record

Men's speed skating

Olympic Games
Silver medal – second place	1936 Garmisch-Partenkirchen	500 m

Georg Philip Hertzberg Krog (2 July 1915 – 3 August 1991) was a Norwegian Olympic speed skater and lawyer.

== Early life ==
Krog was born in Bergen, and was a great-grandson of Hans Jensen Krog.

== Career ==
He received a silver medal at the 1936 Winter Olympics in Garmisch-Partenkirchen. It was later noted that gold medallist Ivar Ballangrud probably was clocked in a second too early, something which could have cost Krog the gold medal. At the 1937 World Allround Speed Skating Championships Krog won the 500 m distance in 42.9 seconds.

He represented the clubs Drammens SK, Gimsøy IF and Oslo SK. He chaired the Norwegian Skating Association from 1961 to 1965. After his speed skating career he worked as a barrister.

Sporting positions
Preceded by Armand Carlsen	President of the Norwegian Skating Association; 1961–1965	Succeeded by Roald Vatn
