= Timo Murama =

Finnish skier

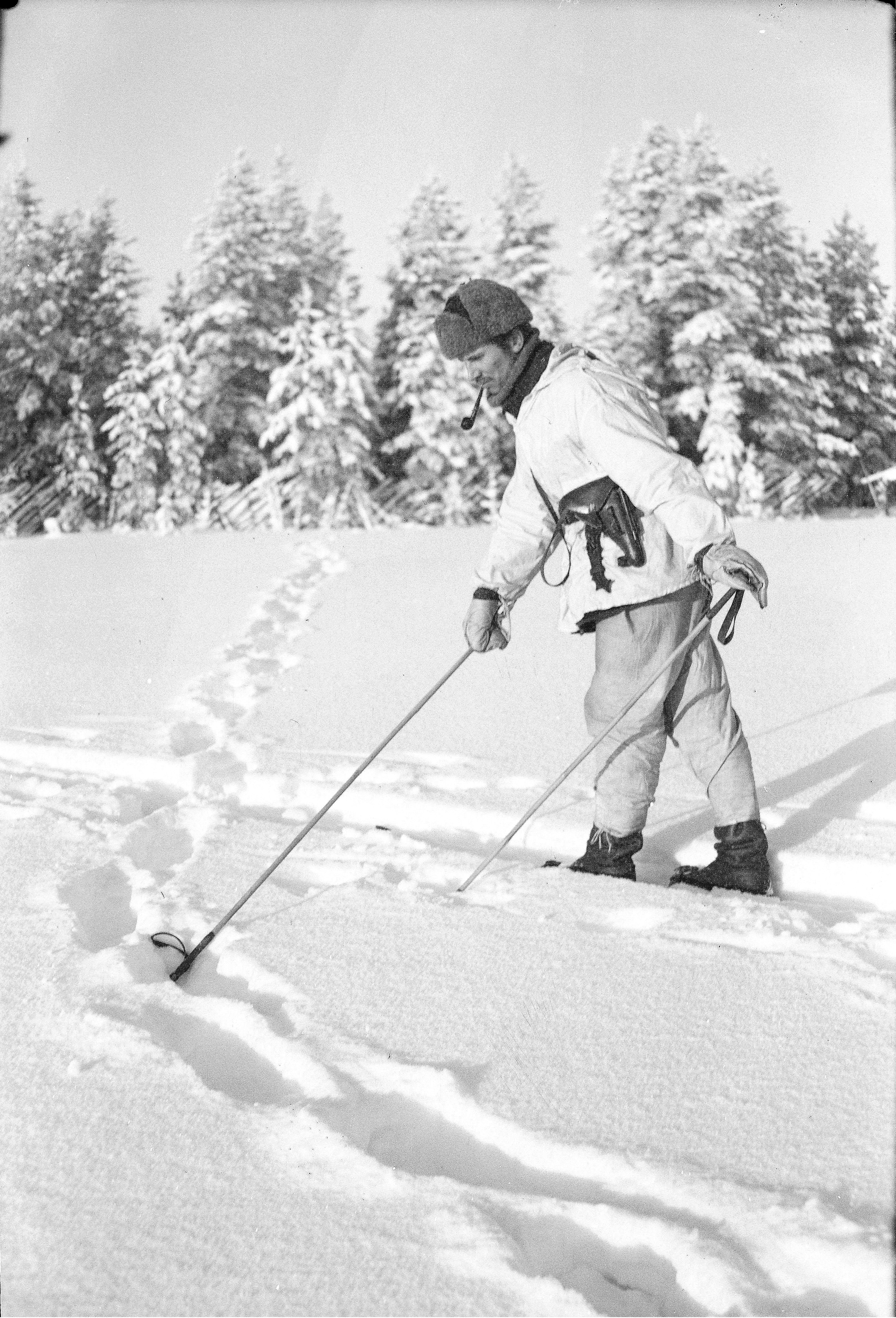
Murama inspecting Soviet ski tracks during the Winter War

Timo Kaapo Arthur Murama (née Moberg; 15 October 1913 – 17 January 1981) was a Finnish Nordic combined skier who competed in the 1930s. He was born and died in Rovaniemi.

He finished tied for seventh in the Nordic combined event at the 1936 Winter Olympics in Garmisch-Partenkirchen.
