= Shinzo Yamada =

Japanese cross-country skier (1914–2000)

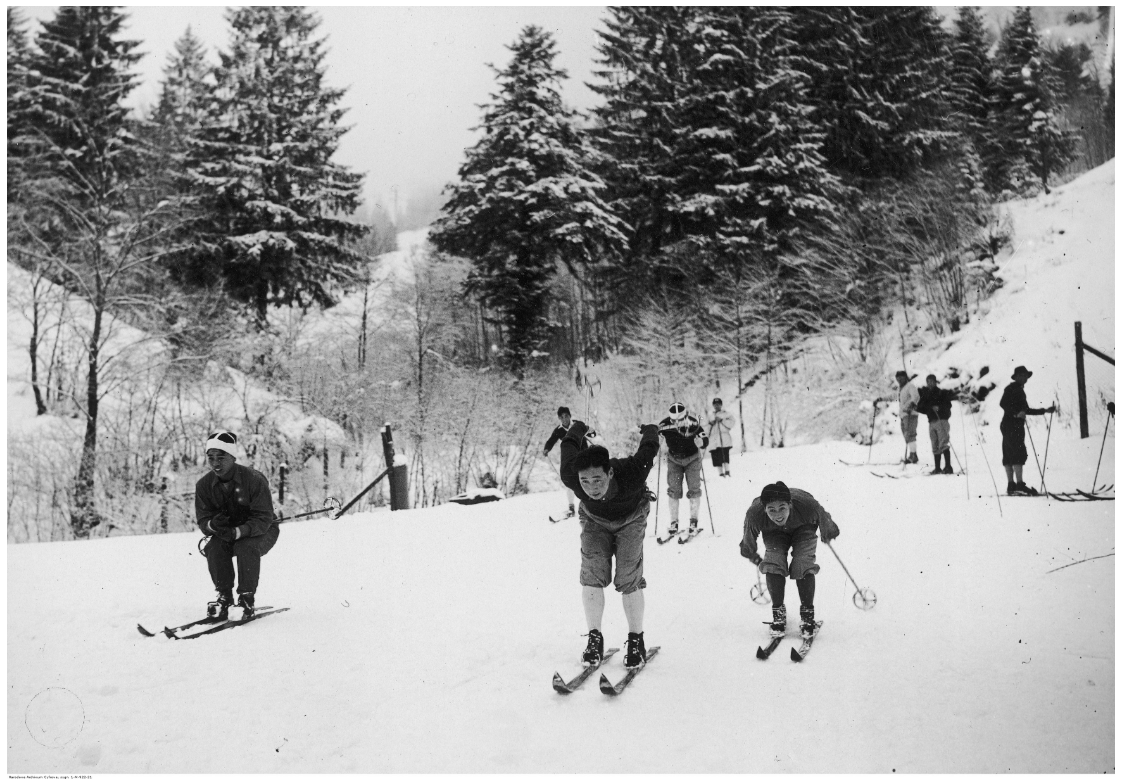
- Japanese Nordic ski team during the 1936 Olympics.

Personal information
- Nationality: Japanese
- Born: 17 January 1914 Aomori, Japan
- Died: 20 March 2000 (aged 86)

Sport
- Sport: Cross-country skiing

Shinzo Yamada (山田 伸三, Yamada Shinzō; 17 January 1914 – 20 March 2000) was a Japanese cross-country skier. He competed in the men's 18 kilometre event at the 1936 Winter Olympics.
