= Aleksander Mitt =

Estonian speed skater

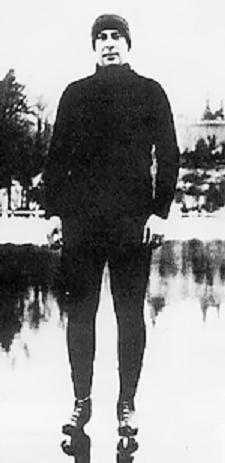
Aleksander Mitt at the 1936 Winter Olympics.

Aleksander Mitt (8 February 1903 in Tartu, Russian Empire – 18 April 1942 in Kirov Oblast, Russia) was an Estonian speed skater who competed at the 1928 and 1936 Winter Olympics.

In 1928 he finished 22nd in the 500 metres event, 20th in the 1500 metres event and 21st in the 5000 metres competition.

In 1936 Mitt finished 22nd in the 500, 1500 and 5000 meters events. In 10000 meters event he did not finish.

He was executed in a Soviet prison camp during World War II.
