= Jorma Ruissalo =

Finnish speed skater

Personal information
- Born: 30 January 1912
- Died: 3 June 2006 (aged 94)

Sport
- Country: Finland
- Sport: Speed skating

Achievements and titles
- Olympic finals: 1936 500 metres speedskating: 8th

Jorma Valter Ruissalo (30 January 1912 – 3 June 2006) was a Finnish speed skater who competed in the 1936 Winter Olympics.

In 1936 he finished eighth in the 500 metres competition.
