= Arvīds Lejnieks =

Latvian speed skater

Personal information
- Full name: Arvīds Roberts Lejnieks
- Nationality: Latvian
- Born: 29 July 1916

Sport
- Sport: Speed skating

Arvīds Roberts Lejnieks (born 29 July 1916, date of death unknown) was a Latvian speed skater. He competed in two events at the 1936 Winter Olympics.
