= Roelof Koops =

Dutch speed skater

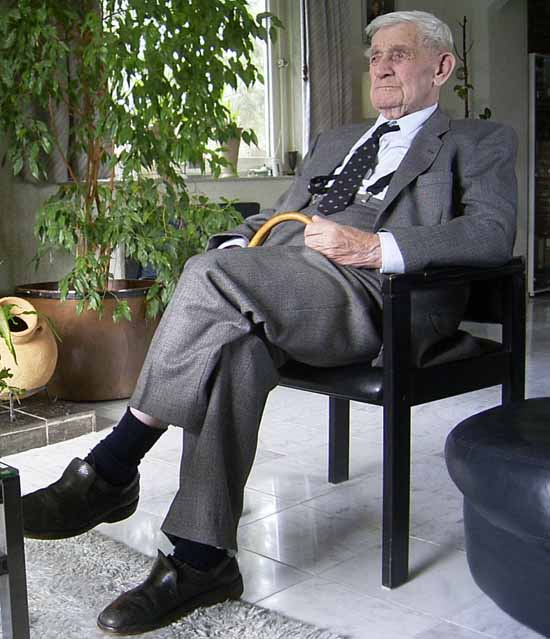
- Roelof Koops (2006)

Personal information
- Born: 19 July 1909 Zuidlaren, Netherlands
- Died: 7 June 2008 (aged 98) Veendam, Netherlands

Sport
- Country: Netherlands
- Sport: Speed skating

Achievements and titles
- Personal best: 1936 Winter Olympics

Roelof Koops (19 July 1909 – 7 June 2008) was a Dutch speed skater who competed in the 1936 Winter Olympics.

He was born in Zuidlaren and died in Veendam.

In 1936 he finished 13th in the 5000 metres event, 17th in the 10000 metres competition, and 30th in the 1500 metres event.
