= Janusz Kalbarczyk =

Polish speed skater

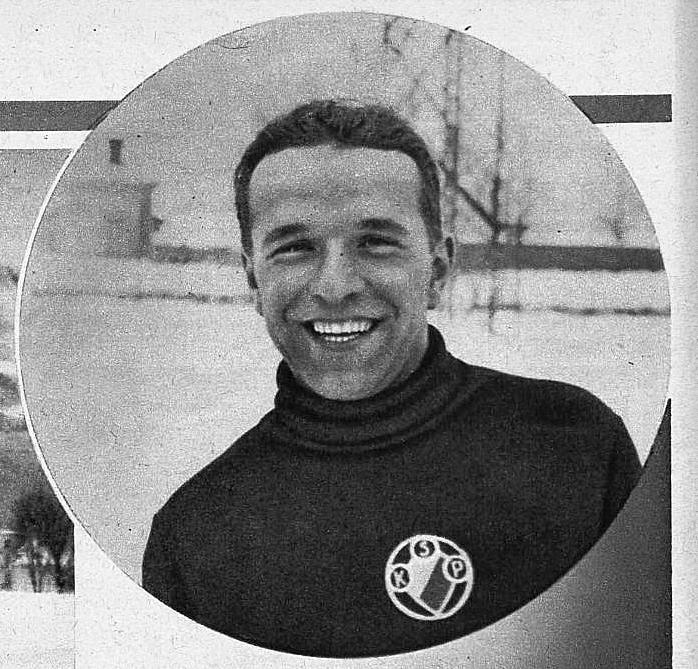

Personal information
- Nationality: Polish
- Born: 13 June 1910; Warsaw, Poland
- Died: 2 March 1999 (aged 88); Warsaw, Poland

Sport
- Sport: Speed skating

Janusz Kalbarczyk (13 June 1910 – 2 March 1999) was a Polish speed skater and architect. He competed in two events at the 1936 Winter Olympics.

He was married with speed skater Jadwiga Nowacka. They had four children together (Bożena, Elżbieta, Dorota and Andrzej). Bożena Kalbarczyk also became a speed skater, who competed at international level.
