= James Graeffe =

Belgian speed skater

Personal information
- Nationality: Belgian
- Born: 7 July 1921
- Died: 1994 (aged 72–73)

Sport
- Sport: Speed skating

James Graeffe (7 July 1921 – 1994) was a Belgian speed skater. He competed in three events at the 1936 Winter Olympics.

He is the son of bobsledder Paul Graeffe who also competed at the 1936 Winter Olympics.
