= Jānis Andriksons =

Latvian speed skater (1912–1967)

Personal information
- Full name: Jānis Valentīns Andriksons
- Nationality: Latvian
- Born: 17 March 1912 Vecpiebalga, Kreis Wenden, Governorate of Livonia, Russian Empire
- Died: 22 September 1967 (aged 55) Noranda, Quebec, Canada

Sport
- Sport: Speed skating

Jānis Valentīns Andriksons (17 March 1912 – 22 September 1967) was a Latvian speed skater. He competed in three events at the 1936 Winter Olympics.

After World War II, he moved to West Germany and then to Canada, where from 1948 he worked in gold and copper mining. He died in Quebec in 1967.
