= László Hidvéghy =

Hungarian speed skater

Personal information
- Nationality: Hungarian
- Born: 9 November 1910; Budapest, Austria-Hungary
- Died: 11 October 1989 (aged 78); Waltham, Massachusetts, United States

Sport
- Sport: Speed skating

László Hidvéghy (9 November 1910 – 11 October 1989) was a Hungarian speed skater. He competed in three events at the 1936 Winter Olympics.
