= Oldřich Hanč =

Czech speed skater (1915–1989)

Personal information
- Nationality: Czech
- Born: 22 March 1915; Plzeň, Austria-Hungary
- Died: 2 December 1989 (aged 74); Prague, Czechoslovakia

Sport
- Sport: Speed skating

Oldřich Hanč (22 March 1915 – 2 December 1989) was a Czech speed skater. He competed in three events at the 1936 Winter Olympics.
