= Ferdinand Preindl =

Austrian speed skater (1912–1998)

Personal information
- Nationality: Austrian
- Born: 25 February 1912; Innsbruck, Austria-Hungary
- Died: 9 December 1998 (aged 86); Bad Goisern am Hallstättersee, Austria

Sport
- Sport: Speed skating

Ferdinand Preindl (25 February 1912 – 9 December 1998) was an Austrian speed skater. He competed at the 1936 Winter Olympics and the 1948 Winter Olympics.
