= Leo Freisinger =

American speed skater

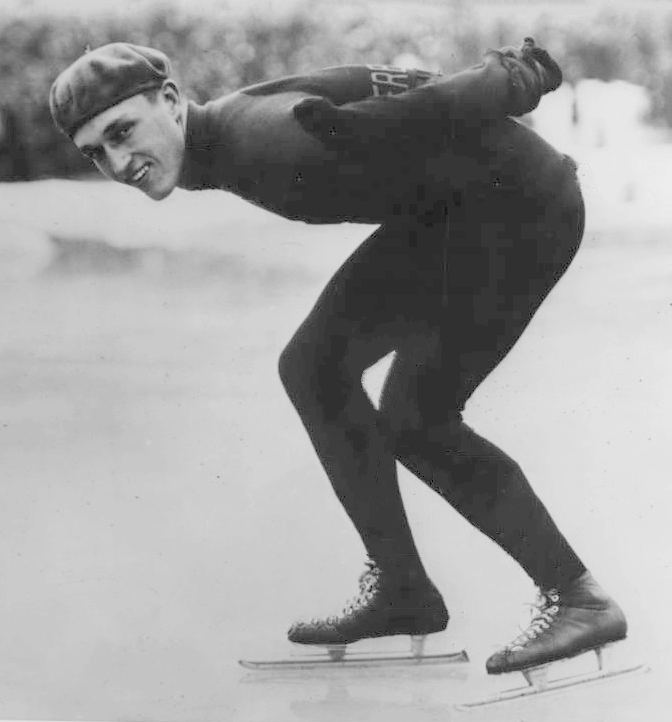
- Freisinger in 1934

Personal information
- Born: February 7, 1916 Chicago, U.S.
- Died: August 29, 1985 (aged 69) Mission Viejo, U.S.

Sport
- Sport: Speed skating
- Club: Chicago CYO

Achievements and titles
- Personal bests: 500 m – 41.9 (1938); 1500 m – 2:18.9 (1938); 5000 m – 8:41.4 (1938)
Medal record
Representing United States
Olympic Games
| Bronze medal – third place | 1936 Garmisch-Partenkirchen | 500 m |

Leonhard Freisinger (February 7, 1916 – August 29, 1985) was an American speed skater who competed at the 1936 Winter Olympics. He won a bronze medal in the 500 m and placed fourth in the 1500 m event. He won the U.S. National Indoor title in 1937 and 1938 and the National and North American Outdoor title in 1940. In 1938 he set a world record over 500 m at a meet in Davos, Switzerland, but Hans Engnestangen beat this record a few minutes later. Freisinger was selected for the 1940 Olympics, but they were canceled due to World War II. Later he became a figure skater in professional ice shows, and coached the 1964 American Olympic speed skating team.
