= Jaromír Turnovský =

Czech speed skater (1912–?)

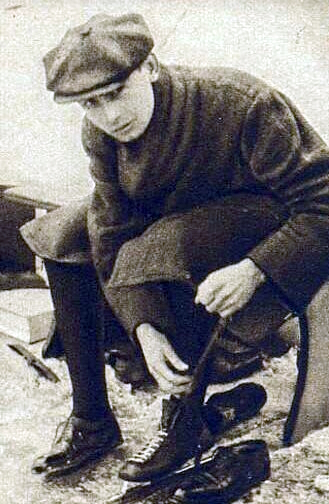
- Jaromír Turnovský in 1933

Personal information
- Nationality: Czech
- Born: 30 August 1912
- Died: 25 June 1993 (aged 80)

Sport
- Sport: Speed skating

Jaromír Turnovský (30 August 1912 – 25 June 1993) was a Czech speed skater. He competed in three events at the 1936 Winter Olympics.
