= Åke Ekman =

Finnish speed skater

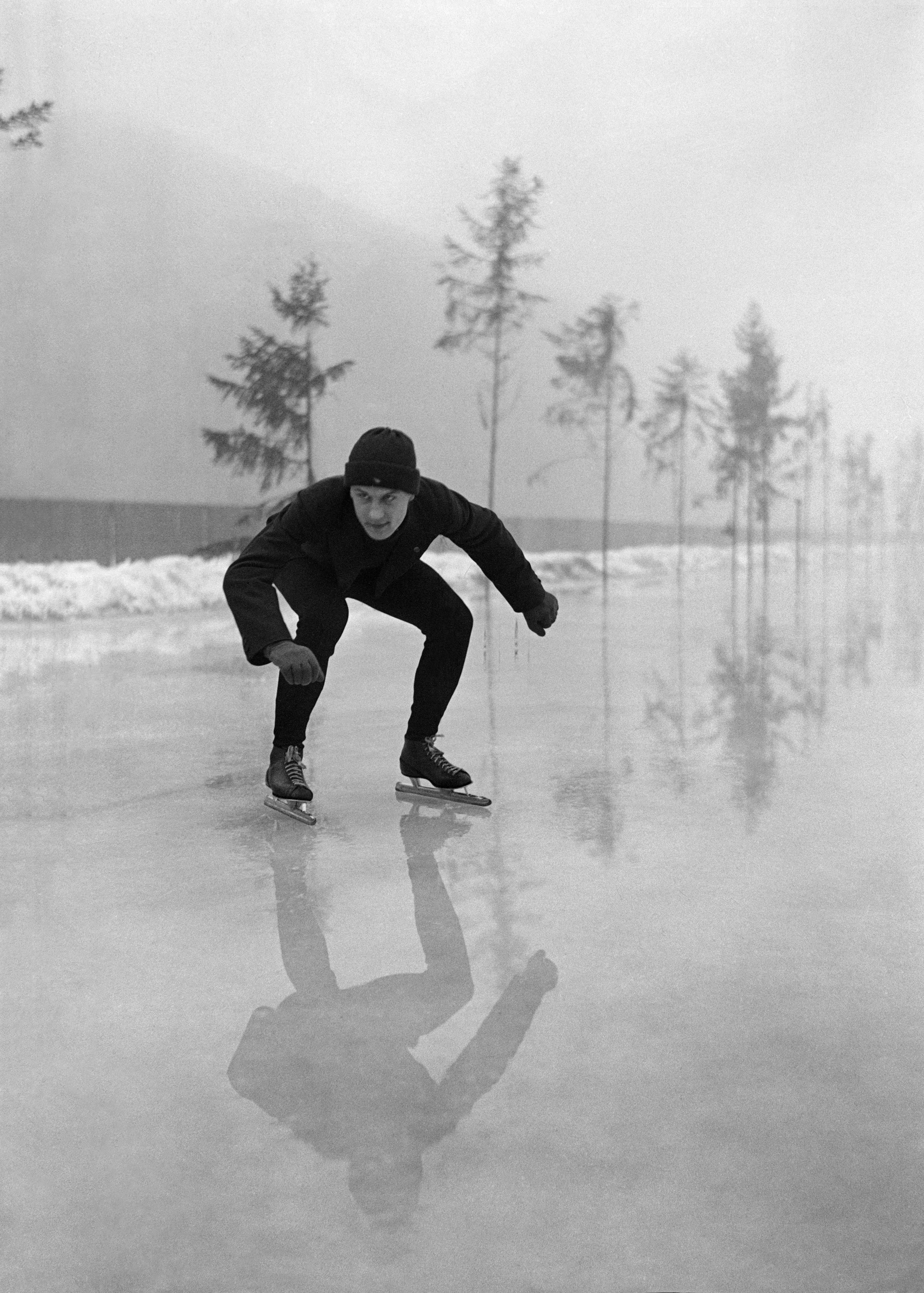
- 1932

Personal information
- Nationality: Finnish
- Born: 14 November 1912; Helsinki, Finland
- Died: 17 September 1965 (aged 52); Helsinki, Finland

Sport
- Sport: Speed skating

Åke Kay Ekman (14 November 1912 – 17 September 1965) was a Finnish speed skater. He competed in two events at the 1936 Winter Olympics.
