= Yushoku Cho =

Japanese speed skater

Personal information
- Nationality: Korean (represented Japan at the Olympics)
- Born: 18 January 1914 Sinuiju, Korea
- Died: 1971 or after 1988

Sport
- Sport: Speed skating

Yushoku Cho, also known as Jang U-sik (Korean: 장우식; Hanja: 張祐植; 18 January 1914 ~ 1971) was a Korean speed skater. He competed in two events at the 1936 Winter Olympics. He competed at the Japan Ice Championship on 25 January 1935, when he was attending Meiji University in Japan, and finished second with 10,000m at 19 minutes, 6 and 4th with 5,000 meters at 9:16. 5. He was selected as the Olympic by-election with Kunio Nado and Daikichi Nakamura. Afterwards, he participated in the 1936 Garmisch-Partenkirchen Winter Olympics, finishing 27th in men's speed skating 5000m and 26th in 10000m, but his personal record was broken. Post-Olympic deeds are not well known and the exact time of death is also unclear. According to Korean data, year 1971 was known as his last year, Marathon Athlete Sohn Kee-Chung also said in an interview with Dong-A Ilbo in 1976, "He has already passed away, and his life is futile."

However, according to Japanese data, it was confirmed that he was living in Tokyo in Japan in 1988, and the reporter asked for an interview, but refused because he was 'too busy'.
