= Samuel J. Dunlop =

Dutch bobsledder (1908–1977)

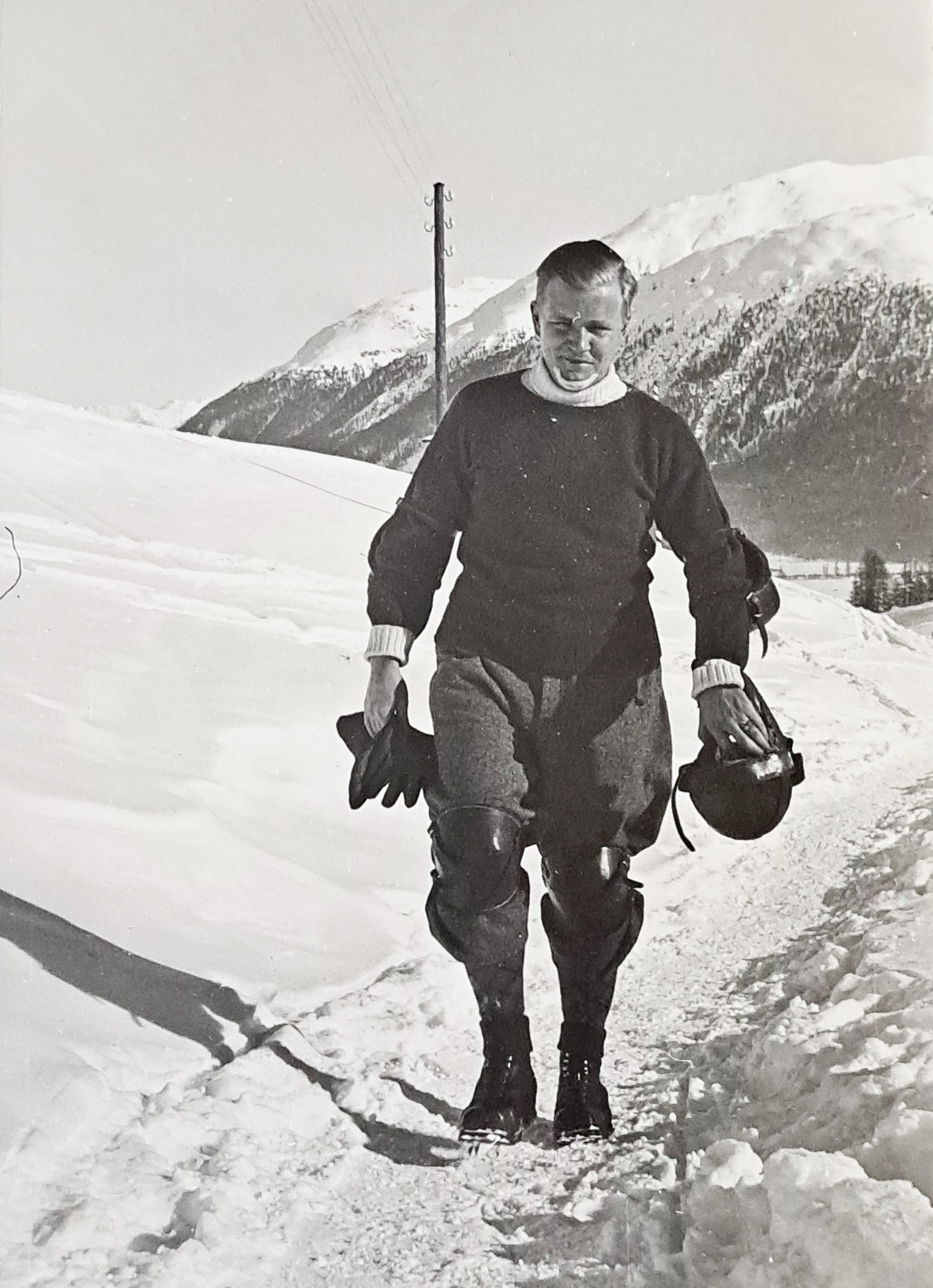

Personal information
- Born: 25 December 1908
- Died: 8 June 1977

Sport
- Sport: bobsledding

Samuel Johannes Cornelis Dunlop (25 December 1908, in Batavia – 8 June 1977, in Utrecht) was a Dutch bobsledder who competed in the mid-1930s. At the 1936 Winter Olympics in Garmisch-Partenkirchen, he finished tenth in the two-man event.
