= Ossi Blomqvist =

Finnish speed skater

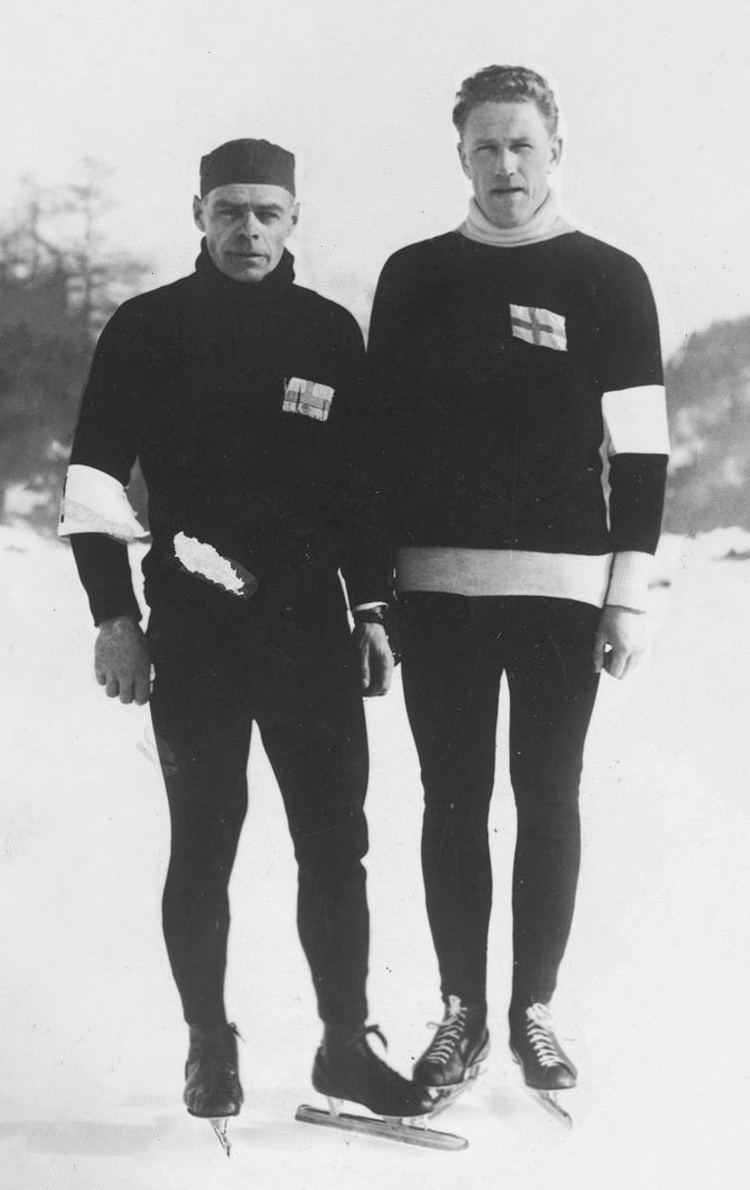
- Clas Thunberg and Blomqvist (right) at the 1931 World Championships

Personal information
- Born: 12 May 1908 Helsinki, Finland
- Died: 3 October 1955 (aged 47) Helsinki, Finland
- Height: 1.68 m (5 ft 6 in)

Sport
- Sport: Speed skating
- Club: Helsingin Luistelijat, Helsinki

Achievements and titles
- Personal best(s): 500 m – 45.0 (1931); 1500 m – 2:22.8 (1932); 5000 m – 8:36.6 (1936); 10000 m – 17:42.4 (1936)
Medal record
Representing Finland
European Speed Skating Championships
Silver medal – second place	1931 Stockholm	All-around
Silver medal – second place	1932 Davos	All-around

Ossian Olavi "Ossi" Blomqvist (12 May 1908 – 3 October 1955) was a Finnish speed skater who won two silver medals at the European all-around championships in 1931 and 1932. He competed over various distances at the 1928, 1932 and 1936 Winter Olympics with the best results of fifth-sixth place in the 5000 m and 10000 m events in 1936. He served as the flag bearer for Finland at the 1932 games. At the world all-around championships Blomqvist placed fifth and seventh in 1931 and 1932, respectively.
