= Antero Ojala =

Finnish speed skater (1916–1982)

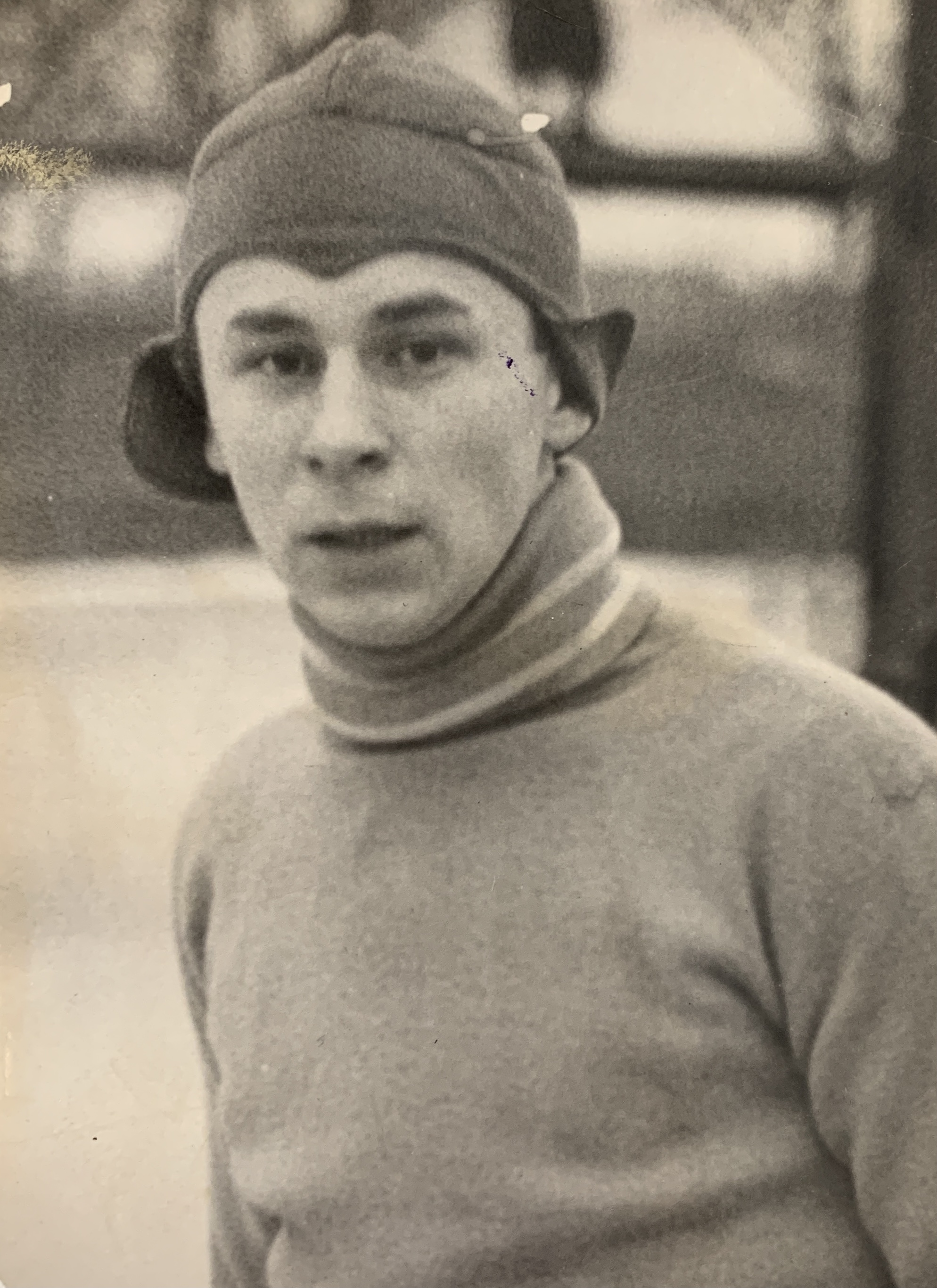
- Born: Yrjö Antero Ojala; December 10, 1916
- Died: February 5, 1982 (aged 65)

Yrjö Antero Ojala (December 10, 1916 – February 5, 1982) was a Finnish speed skater who competed in the 1936 Winter Olympics and in the 1948 Winter Olympics.

== Career ==
In 1936 he won the bronze medal in the 5000 metres competition. In the 10000 metres event he finished seventh, in the 500 metres competition he finished eighth, and in the 1500 metres event he finished ninth.

Twelve years later he finished twelfth in the 1500 metres competition, 14th in the 500 metres event, and 26th in the 5000 metres competition.
