= Seien Kin =

Japanese speed skater (1914–1992)

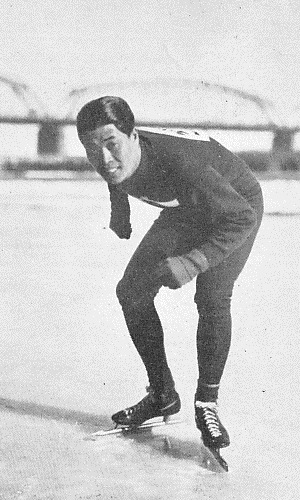
- Seien Kin in 1934

Personal information
- Nationality: Japanese, then South Korean
- Born: 7 January 1914 Pyongyang, Korea, Empire of Japan
- Died: 16 July 1992 (aged 78) South Korea

Sport
- Sport: Speed skating

Kim Jeong-yeon(7 January 1914 – 16 July 1992), also known as 'Seien Kin', was a Korean speed skater. He competed in three events at the 1936 Winter Olympics.
