= Willi Sandner =

German speed skater

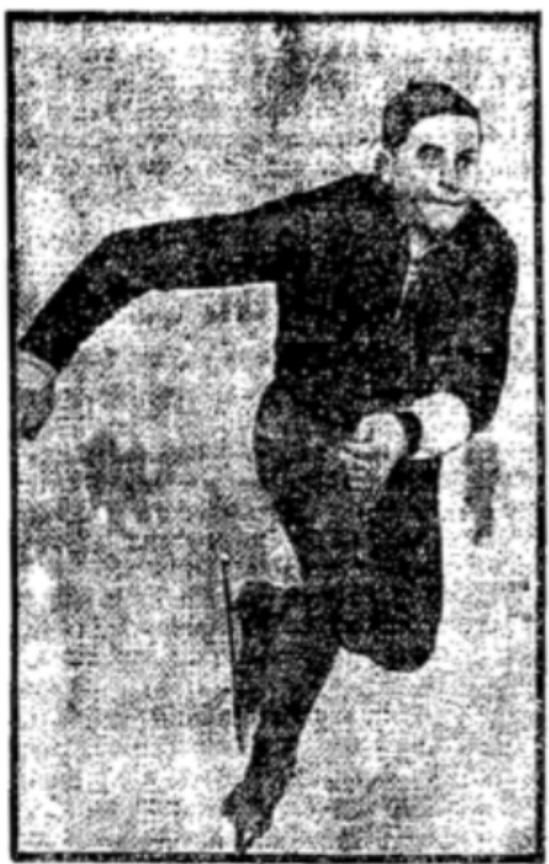
- Sandner in 1933

Personal information
- Born: 8 March 1911; Munich, German Empire
- Died: June 1984 (aged 73); Munich, West Germany

Sport
- Sport: Speed skating

Willi Sandner (8 March 1911 – June 1984) was a German speed skater. He competed in four events at the 1936 Winter Olympics. Sandner was a six time national champion and set a dozen national records.
