= Edvard Wangberg =

Norwegian speed skater

Edvard Einarsen Wangberg (15 November 1913 – 30 July 1983) was a Norwegian speed skater from Trondheim. He participated at the 1936 Winter Olympics, where he placed 20th in the 5,000 metres and 18th in the 10,000 metres. He placed seventh at the 1937 World Allround Speed Skating Championships.
