= Thomas White (speed skater) =

Canadian speed skater (1915–1993)

Personal information
- Born: 30 April 1915 Saint John, New Brunswick, Canada
- Died: 27 September 1993 (aged 78) Saint John, New Brunswick, Canada

Sport
- Sport: Speed skating

Thomas Paul White (30 April 1915 – 27 September 1993) was a Canadian speed skater. He competed in four events at the 1936 Winter Olympics.
