= Kunio Nando =

Japanese speed skater

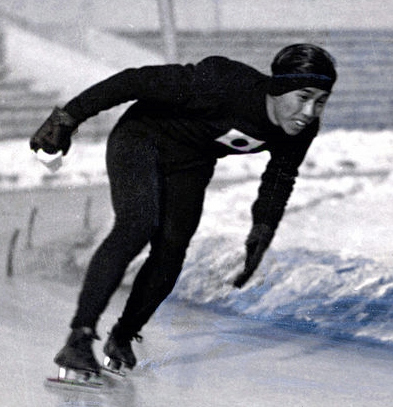
- Kunio Nando c. 1936

Personal information
- Born: 4 December 1916 Iwate Prefecture, Japan
- Died: 12 August 2011 (aged 94) Tokyo, Japan
- Education: Waseda University, Tokyo

Sport
- Sport: Speed skating
- Club: Waseda University, Tokyo

Kunio Nando (南洞 邦夫, Nandō Kunio), (4 December 1916 – 12 August 2011) was a Japanese speed skater. He competed at the 1936 Winter Olympics in the 500 m and 5000 m events and finished in 22nd and 31st place, respectively.

In retirement Nando worked as a skating coach, and trained the national team for the 1956 and 1960 Olympics. He served as president of Japan Skating Federation and of Japan Curling Association. He was instrumental in adding curling to the 1998 Nagano Olympics. In 2000 he was awarded the Olympic Order, and in 2006 the Freytag Award from the World Curling Federation. He was the first Asian person to receive the Freytag Award.

Personal bests:

- 500 m – 44.5 (1938)
- 1500 m – 2:27.3 (1939)
- 5000 m – 9:11.0 (1940)
- 10000 m – 19:31.8 (1938)
