= Heinz Sames =

German speed skater

Personal information
- Nationality: German
- Born: 10 July 1911; Berlin, German Empire
- Died: 29 January 1943 (aged 31); Stalingrad, Soviet Union

Sport
- Sport: Speed skating

Heinz Sames (10 July 1911 – 29 January 1943) was a German speed skater. He competed in four events at the 1936 Winter Olympics. He was killed in action during World War II in the Battle of Stalingrad.
