= Kenneth Kennedy (speed skater) =

Australian speed skater

- Born: Kenneth George "Ken" Kennedy; 6 September 1913; Sydney
- Died: 20 August 1985 (aged 71)
- Education: Waverley College
- Occupation: Speed skater

Kenneth George Kennedy (6 September 1913 – 20 August 1985) was the first Winter Olympian to compete for Australia.

== Early life ==
He was born in Sydney and was educated at Waverley College was a speed skater and ice hockey player.

== Career ==
Ken Kennedy was the Australian quarter mile and mile champion speed skater from 1931 to 1934, and played interstate ice hockey. In the next two years, he played for the Birmingham, England Maple Leaf ice hockey team.

Kennedy competed in speed skating at the 1936 Winter Olympics at the age of 22. Even though he was the only member of the Australian team, his entry received official backing from the then Australian Olympic Federation, which said:

For the first time in Olympic history Australia will be represented at the Winter section of the Olympic Games. The Executive Committee has carefully considered and endorsed the entry of Kenneth G. Kennedy to represent in the Ice Speed Skating events.

His best result was 29th in the 500 metres. He had the following to say about the games held in Garmisch-Partenkirchen in Nazi Germany:

They were magnificent, well staged and closely policed by the army

Wherever you went there were guards ... the army. They did not interfere but you knew they were there to keep order and to make doubly sure nothing went wrong for the Fuhrer.

The New South Wales Olympic Council reported:

Kennedy ... has the honour of being the first representative chosen for the winter section of the Olympic Games ... [He] amply justified his nomination.

== Later life and legacy ==
After the Olympics, he turned professional, earning 75 pounds a week in a time in England when "the basic wage was 50 bob" (about two and a half pounds). He featured in ice shows and did barrel jumping.

When World War II broke out, Kennedy joined the Royal Air Force. After the war, he returned to Australia. He played ice hockey in Australia for another six years. He became president of the Australian Ice Hockey Association and the association's delegate to the Australian Olympic Federation, where he argued that overseas trips would be needed for Australia to reach world standard. In the 1980s, he still skated and owned an ice skating equipment shop near Central railway station, Sydney. He died in August 1985 at the age 72. His family would donate a perpetual trophy for the "Most Sportsmanlike" player in Australian Ice Hockey; this would later become the Trophy for the Most Valuable Player of the Australian Ice Hockey League from 2010 onwards. After his death he was inducted into the Sport Australia Hall of Fame as an inaugural member.
