= Seitoku Ri =

Japanese speed skater (1912–1968)

Personal information
- Nationality: Japanese, then South Korean
- Born: 20 January 1912; Sinuiju, Korea, Empire of Japan
- Died: 8 July 1968 (aged 56); Seoul, South Korea

Sport
- Sport: Speed skating

Seitoku Ri (李 聖徳, Ri Seitoku, 20 January 1912 – 8 July 1968) was a Korean speed skater. He competed in four events at the 1936 Winter Olympics.
