= Birger Wasenius =

Finnish speed skater

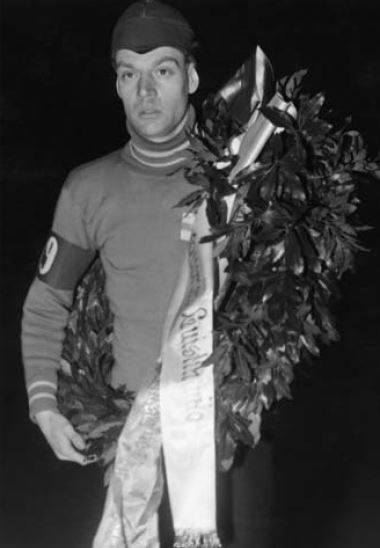
- Birger Wasenius (1939)

Medal record

Representing Finland

Men's speed skating

Olympic Games
| Bronze medal – third place | 1936 Garmisch-Partenkirchen | 1,500 m |
| Silver medal – second place | 1936 Garmisch-Partenkirchen | 5,000 m |
| Silver medal – second place | 1936 Garmisch-Partenkirchen | 10,000 m |

Birger Wasenius (7 December 1911 – 2 January 1940) was a Finnish World Champion in speed skating. He was born in Helsinki.

Wasenius reached the world top in 1933 when he won a silver medal at the European Allround Championships. More medals soon followed, including two silver medals and one bronze medal at the 1936 Winter Olympics of Garmisch-Partenkirchen, but none of them were gold. Most of the gold medals those days went to Norwegian skater Ivar Ballangrud. In fact, four of the six silver medals Wasenius won at the Winter Olympics, the World Allround Championships, and the European Allround Championships were behind Ballangrud. Finally, at the 1939 World Allround Championships of Helsinki, his city of birth, Wasenius became World Allround Champion, winning the 1,500 m and finishing second on the other three distances.

At the end of 1939, the Winter War between Finland and the Soviet Union broke out, and Wasenius was killed early 1940 while fighting for the Finnish army on the islands of Lake Ladoga.

== Medals ==
An overview of medals won by Wasenius at important championships he participated in, listing the years in which he won each:

| Championships | Gold medal | Silver medal | Bronze medal |
|---|---|---|---|
| Winter Olympics | – | 1936 (5,000 m); 1936 (10,000 m) | 1936 (1,500 m) |
| World Allround | 1939 | 1934; 1936; 1937 | – |
| European Allround | – | 1933 | 1935; 1937 |

In addition, Wasenius won the Finnish National Allround Championships in 1933, 1934, 1935, 1937, 1938, and 1939 – a total of six times.

== Personal records ==
To put these personal records in perspective, the WR column lists the official world records on the dates that Wasenius skated his personal records.

| Event | Result | Date | Venue | WR |
|---|---|---|---|---|
| 500 m | 43.4 | 5 February 1938 | Davos | 42.3 |
| 1,500 m | 2:18.2 | 31 January 1937 | Davos | 2:17.4 |
| 3,000 m | 4:55.7 | 30 January 1937 | Davos | 4:49.6 |
| 5,000 m | 8:21.3 | 31 January 1937 | Davos | 8:17.2 |
| 10,000 m | 17:28.2 | 14 February 1936 | Garmisch-Partenkirchen | 17:17.4 |

Wasenius has an Adelskalender score of 192.006 points. His highest ranking on the Adelskalender was a third place.
