= Charles de Ligne (speed skater) =

Belgian speed skater

Personal information
- Born: 21 September 1895
- Died: 14 November 1944 (aged 49)

Sport
- Sport: Speed skating
- Event: 500-10000 m

Achievements and titles
- Personal best(s): 500 m – 1:04.9 (1936); 1500 m – 3:21.9 (1936); 10000 m – 23:32.9 (1936)

Charles de Ligne (12 September 1895 – 14 November 1944) was a Belgian speed skater. Aged 40, he competed in four events at the 1936 Winter Olympics with the best result of 28th place over 10,000 m.

De Ligne was a successful businessman and a decorated officer, who fought in World War I and was part of the Belgian underground movement during World War II, helping to rescue downed Allied pilots. He was married to figure skater Yvonne de Ligne, who fell in love with a young Dutch figure skater in 1944. She hired a man to kill de Ligne and made it look as if he was killed by the Gestapo. The murder was solved in 1945. Yvonne de Ligne was sentenced to death, later reduced to 20 years. She was released in August 1951 due to poor health, and died from tuberculosis shortly afterwards.
