= Riessersee =

Lake in Germany

- Location within Bavaria

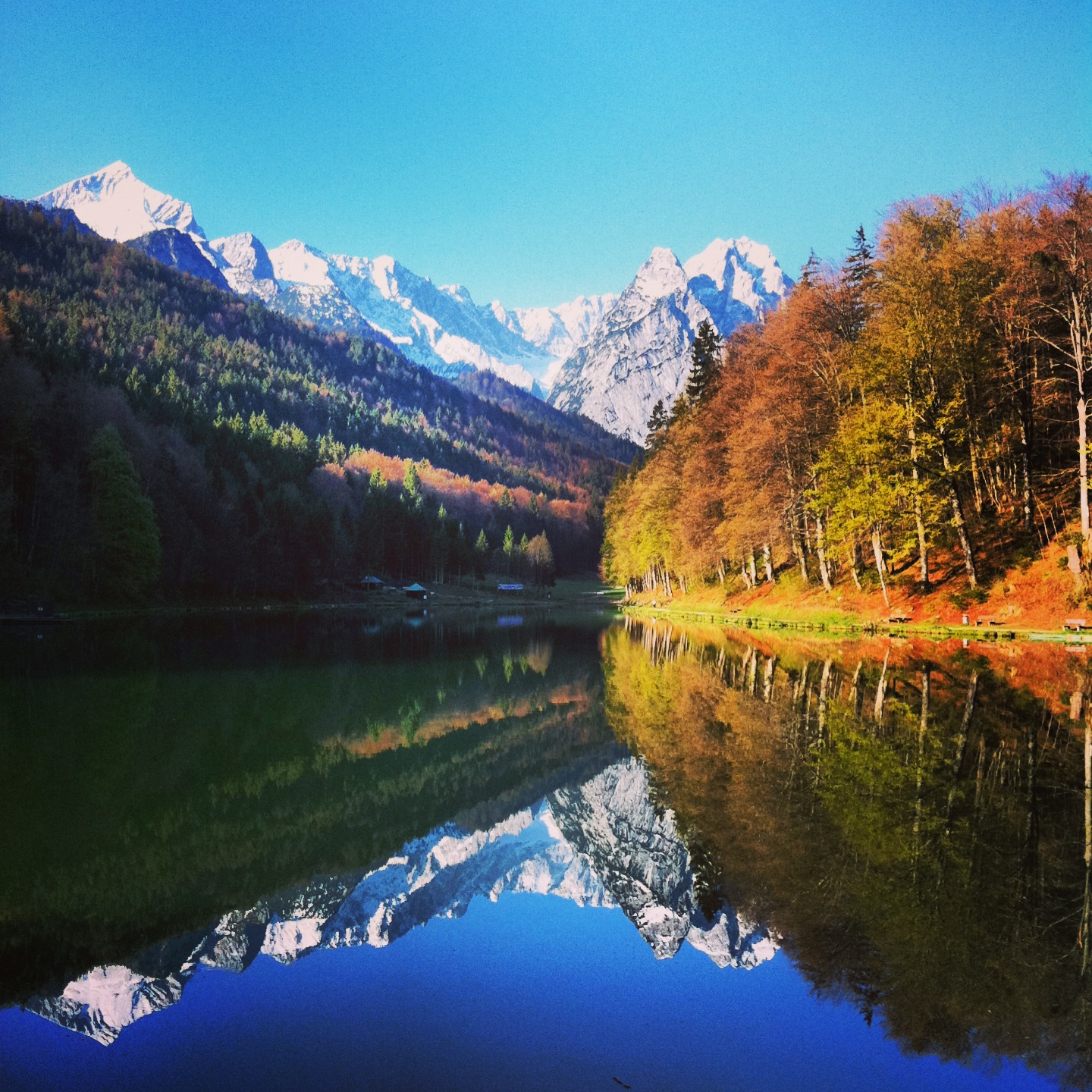
- Autumn at Riessersee, October 2013.
- Location: Bavaria
- Coordinates: 47°28′39″N 11°4′48″E
- Basin countries: Germany

Riessersee is a German lake located in southwest Garmisch-Partenkirchen. The lake itself hosted the speed skating events and 10 of the 37 ice hockey games for the 1936 Winter Olympics. Adjacent to the lake, the bobsleigh events took place.

== Bobsleigh track ==
Originally constructed in 1910, the track was renovated in 1933 and was 1,525 m (5,003 ft) long. Costing 155,000 ℛ︁ℳ︁ to complete, the track was used for the 1936 Games. Having seven different seating locations, the track could seat 17,940 and the events were sold out during competition. The track was demolished in 1966. Remnants of the track can be seen on sleigh rides near the lake.

Physical statistics
| Sport | Length (meters) | Turns | Vertical drop (start to finish) | Average grade (%) |
|---|---|---|---|---|
| Bobsleigh | 1525 | 17 | 129.43 | 8.49 |

No turn names are given for the track.

Besides the 1936 Winter Games, it also hosted the FIBT World Championships in 1934 (four-man), 1938 (four-man), 1953, and 1962.
