= Alfons Bērziņš =

Latvian speed skater

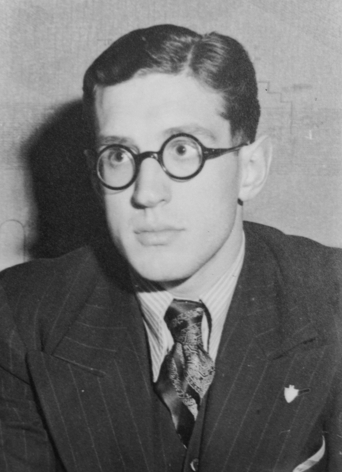

Personal information
- Born: Alfons Elmārs Bērziņš; 7 November 1916 Riga, Russian Empire
- Died: 16 December 1987 (aged 71) Riga, Latvian SSR, Soviet Union

Sport
- Country: Latvia
- Sport: Speed skating
- Club: Universitātes sports
- Retired: 1940s

Alfons Bērziņš (7 November 1916 – 16 December 1987) was a Latvian long track speed skater. He competed at the 1936 Winter Olympics (got 14th place in the 500 m event). In 1939 he became overall champion at the European Championships.

== Biography ==
Alfons Bērziņš was born 7 November 1916 in Riga. He started his training in speed skating in 1932. His first coach was former Olympic Latvian speed skater Alberts Rumba. In 1938 he graduated Riga city gymnasium No.2. During second half of the 1930s he was a member of the university team Universitātes sports (University sport). Before World War II he married Olympic Latvian mountain skier Mirdza Martinsone.

In 1942 he started engineering studies in University of Latvia however he never graduated. During World War II Bērziņš was conscripted in Latvian Legion in 1944 and served as a platoon commander in anti-aircraft unit (SS-Flak-Abteilung 506). In April 1944 he was awarded Iron Cross II class. With the capitulation of Courland Pocket in May 1945 Bērziņš entered Soviet captivity. He was sentenced to 10 years of hard labour in GULAG camp. He was released in 1955 and returned to Latvia. He started to work as a skating coach. One of his most famous pupils was Latvian speed skater Lāsma Kauniste.

Alfons Bērziņš died on 16 December 1987 in Riga. He was interred in the Riga Forest Cemetery.

== Personal records ==
- 500 m – 42,9
- 1500 m – 2.16,4
- 5000 m – 8.32,8
- 10 000 m – 17.47,2
