= Charles Mathiesen =

Norwegian speed skater (1911–1994)

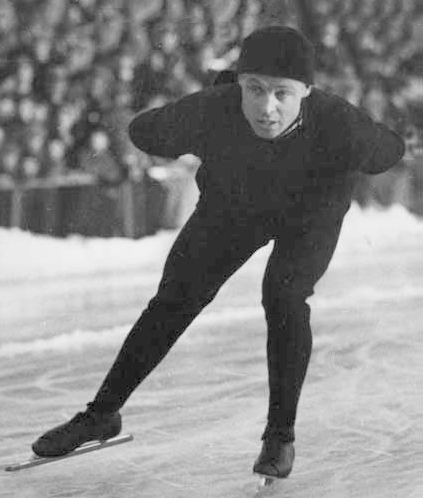
- Mathiesen at the 1936 Olympics

Personal information
- Born: 12 February 1911 Drammen, Norway
- Died: 7 November 1994 (aged 83) Drammen, Norway

Sport
- Sport: Speed skating
- Club: Drammens SK

Achievements and titles
- Personal best(s): 500 m – 43.2 (1940); 1500 m – 2:15.6 (1939); 5000 m – 8:18.7 (1940); 10000 m – 17:01.5 (1940)
Medal record
Representing Norway
Olympic Games
Gold medal – first place	1936 Garmisch-Partenkirchen	1500 m

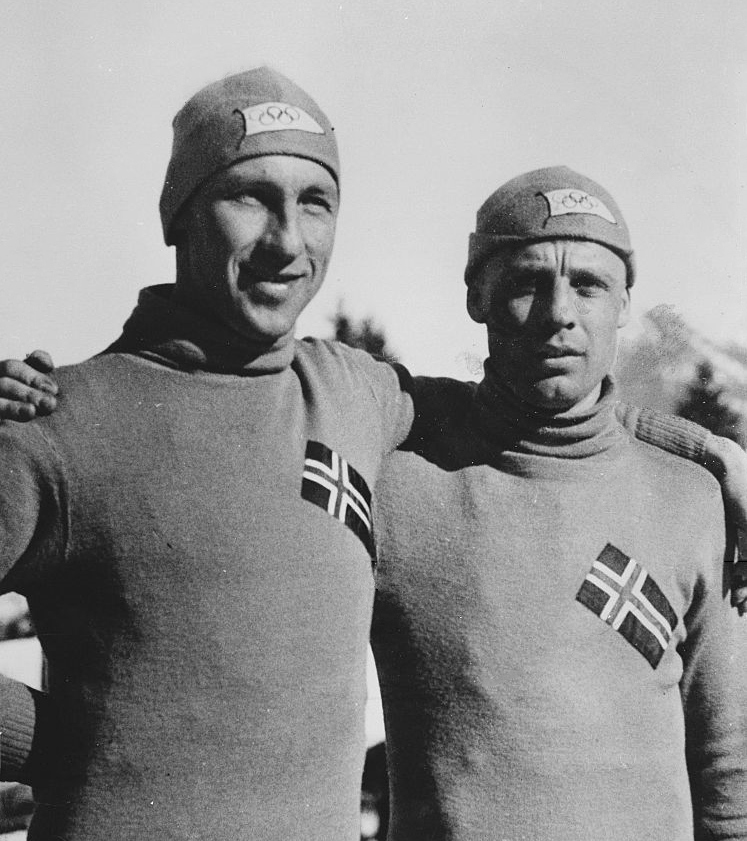
Ivar Ballangrud and Charles Mathiesen (right) at the 1936 Olympics

Charles Mathiesen (12 February 1911 – 7 November 1994) was a speed skater who was active from 1930 to 1948.

== Biography ==
Mathiesen was born in Drammen, Norway. Skating for Drammens Skøyteklubb (Drammen's Skating Club – the same club Ivar Ballangrud represented for a while), Charles Mathiesen made his international debut in 1933, finishing eighth at the World Allround Championships. The following year, Mathiesen won his first medal when he took the silver at the Norwegian Allround Championships (held at his hometown of Drammen) behind Michael Staksrud. Mathiesen won the Norwegian Allround Championships, being the "eternal runner-up" behind skaters like Ballangrud, Staksrud, Hans Engnestangen, and a few more, winning silver a total number of six times.

The season after winning his first medal, Mathiesen participated in the 1936 Winter Olympics in Garmisch-Partenkirchen and became Olympic Champion on the 1,500 m. He skated a new Olympic record on that distance, but did not beat the world record set by Oscar Mathisen 22 year earlier. However, he turned out to be the only skater who was able to beat his teammate Ivar Ballangrud during those Olympics and thereby the only one to keep Ballangrud from winning Olympic gold on all four distances.

More national and international successes followed, including becoming European Allround Champion in 1938 and – at the World Allround Championships two weeks after that – coming very close to breaking the world record on the 10,000 m. However, he was paired against Ballangrud in his 10,000 m race, and although both finished in the same time of 17:14.4, Ballangrud was declared the winner and therefore also became the new world record holder. Times were measured to a precision of only one tenth of a second in those days and so a time of 17:14.4 on the 10,000 m – an average speed of 9.57 m/s – meant that one skater could finish almost one meter (a little over three feet) behind another skater and still have the same time. Two years later, he skated a world record in the 10,000 m, which stood for almost 9 years.

Mathiesen may have won more medals if it had not been for World War II. As a result of that war, the European Allround Championships were not held in the years 1940-1945, nor the World Allround Championships in the years 1940-1946. In fact, Mathiesen proved that he was (still) at the world top immediately before the war and immediately after the war by winning bronze at Unofficial World Championships held in 1940 and 1946. In those same years, he also won his last two silver medals at the Norwegian Allround Championships.

Twelve years after having won his 1,500 m Olympic gold medal, Mathiesen participated in the 5,000 m at the 1948 Winter Olympics in St. Moritz, but the relatively low oxygen levels at the ice rink there – located 1,856 m (6,089 ft) above sea level – caused him to have trouble breathing and 3,000 m into his 5,000 m race, he collapsed and was taken to a hospital.

== Medals ==
An overview of medals won by Mathiesen at important championships he participated in, listing the years in which he won each:

Championships	Gold medal	Silver medal	Bronze medal
Winter Olympics	1936 (1,500 m)	–	–
World Allround	–	–	1938; 1939
European Allround	1938	1936; 1939	–
Norwegian Allround	–	1934; 1936; 1937; 1939; 1940; 1946	1935; 1938; 1948

== World records ==
Over the course of his career, Mathiesen skated one world record:

Discipline	Time	Date	Location
10,000 m	17.01,5	3 March 1940	(Norway) Hamar

Source: SpeedSkatingStats.com

== Personal records ==
To put these personal records in perspective, the WR column lists the official world records on the dates that Mathiesen skated his personal records.

Event	Result	Date	Venue	WR
500 m	43.2	20 February 1940	Oslo	41.8
1,000 m	1:32.0	2 March 1940	Hamar	1:28.4
1,500 m	2:15.6	29 January 1939	Davos	2:14.9
3,000 m	4:50.6	10 February 1940	Bergen	4:49.6
5,000 m	8:18.7	2 March 1940	Hamar	8:17.2
10,000 m	17:01.5	3 March 1940	Hamar	17:14.4

Mathiesen has an Adelskalender score of 189.345 points. His highest ranking on the Adelskalender was a second place.
