= Ivar Ballangrud =

Norwegian speed skater

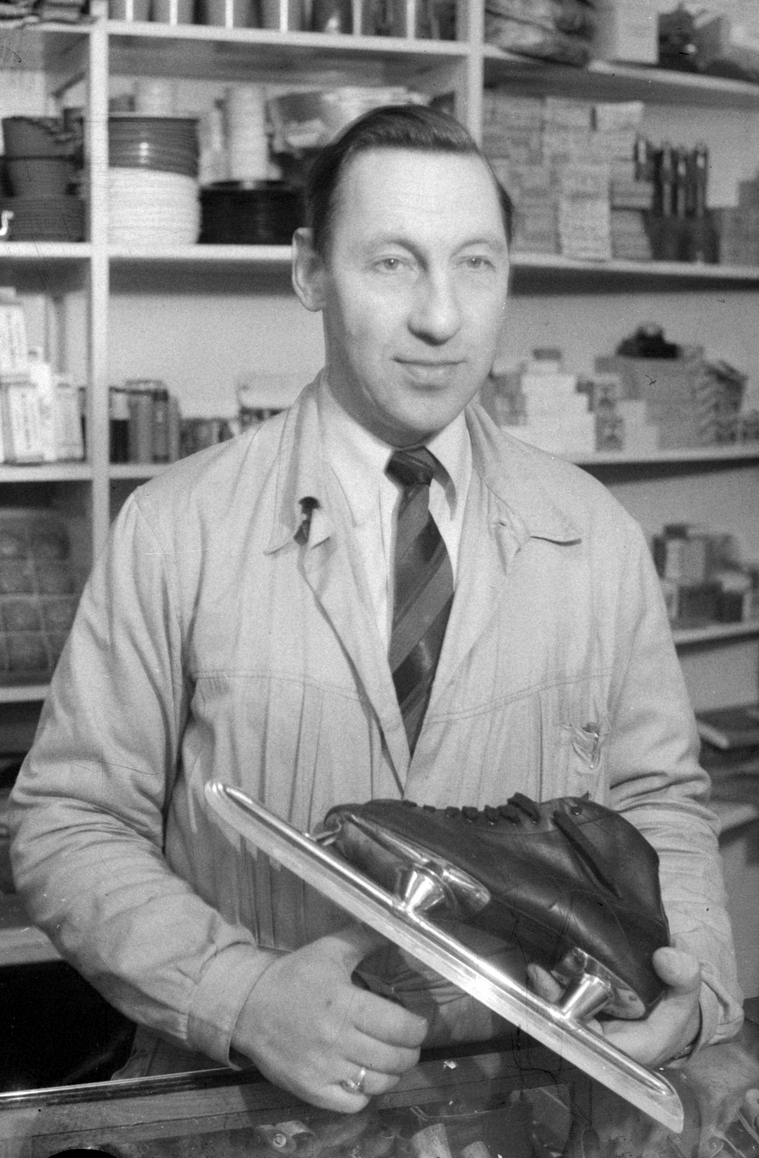
- Ballangrud at his skating store in 1949

Personal information
- Born: 7 March 1904 Lunner, Norway
- Died: 1 June 1969 (aged 65) Trondheim, Norway
- Height: 1.80 m (5 ft 11 in)

Sport
- Country: Norway
- Sport: Speed skating
- Club: Oslo SK; Drammens SK
- Retired: 1939

Achievements and titles
- Personal bests: 500 m – 42.7 (1939); 1500 m – 2:14.0 (1939); 5000 m – 8:17.2 (1936); 10,000 m – 17:14.4 (1938)
Medal record
Representing Norway
Olympic Games
Gold medal – first place	1928 St. Moritz	5000 m
Gold medal – first place	1936 Garmisch-P.	500 m
Gold medal – first place	1936 Garmisch-P.	5000 m
Gold medal – first place	1936 Garmisch-P.	10,000 m
Silver medal – second place	1932 Lake Placid	10,000 m
Silver medal – second place	1936 Garmisch-P.	1500 m
Bronze medal – third place	1928 St. Moritz	1500 m
World Allround Championships
Gold medal – first place	1926 Trondheim	Allround
Gold medal – first place	1932 Lake Placid	Allround
Gold medal – first place	1936 Davos	Allround
Gold medal – first place	1938 Davos	Allround
Silver medal – second place	1928 Davos	Allround
Silver medal – second place	1929 Oslo	Allround
Silver medal – second place	1930 Oslo	Allround
Silver medal – second place	1935 Oslo	Allround
Bronze medal – third place	1931 Helsinki	Allround
Bronze medal – third place	1933 Trondheim	Allround
Bronze medal – third place	1934 Helsinki	Allround
European Championships
Gold medal – first place	1929 Davos	Allround
Gold medal – first place	1930 Trondheim	Allround
Gold medal – first place	1933 Viipuri	Allround
Gold medal – first place	1936 Oslo	Allround
Bronze medal – third place	1927 Stockholm	Allround
Bronze medal – third place	1938 Oslo	Allround

Ivar Eugen Ballangrud (né Eriksen, 7 March 1904 – 1 June 1969) was a Norwegian speed skater, a four-time Olympic champion in speed skating. As the only triple gold medalist at the 1936 Winter Olympics, Ballangrud was the most successful athlete there.

== Biography ==
Ivar Ballangrud was one of the most successful speed skaters in the world for a period of 15 years, from 1924 to 1939. Coming from the small place Lunner on Hadeland, he was a member of the famous "Hadeland Trio", consisting of himself, Michael Staksrud and Hans Engnestangen. He represented the club Trondhjems Skøiteklub.

Ballangrud was four times World Allround Champion, four times European Allround Champion, five times Norwegian Allround Champion, and four times Olympic Champion. He won three Olympic titles at the 1936 Winter Olympics in Garmisch-Partenkirchen: 500 m (quite surprisingly), 5000 m, and 10,000 m. On the 1500 m during those Winter Olympics, he won silver – his teammate Charles Mathiesen being the only one to keep him from winning gold in all four speed skating events. Ballangrud had won his first Olympic gold 8 years earlier on the 5000 m at the 1928 Winter Olympics. In addition, he won a bronze medal (1500 m) in 1928 and a silver medal (10,000 m) at the 1932 Winter Olympics. He would have been the favourite for winning more Olympic gold in 1932 if the races had been held in the normal European way, not the American pack-style way where all competitors are on the ice at the same time.

He made his international debut as a 19-year-old rising star in 1924, although it was too late to compete in the Winter Olympics that year. However, he was paired with Julius Skutnabb – who had just become the Olympic 10,000 m Champion – in his first World Championships in Helsinki in 1924, and beat the champion on his homeground. In 1930, he dethroned Oscar Mathisen from the top of the Adelskalender and he would remain the number one on the Adelskalender for seven years.

In addition to his five official world records, Ballangrud skated 16:46.4 in a 10,000 m pack-style test race before the Olympic Games in 1932. This time was 31 seconds below the then-current world record and it would stand unbeaten as the fastest 10,000 m time for twenty years, until Hjalmar Andersen set his famous world record of 16:32.6.

In December 1932 it was announced that he became professional.

Ballangrud was born as Ivar Eriksen. His mother changed his last name when she remarried following her husband's death. In retirement Ballangrud worked at his sporting good store in Drammen, and later in Trondheim. A statue in his honor was raised in his native Jevnaker.

== Records ==
=== World records ===
Over the course of his career, Ballangrud skated five world records:

Distance	Time	Date	Location
5000 m	8:24.2	19 January 1929	Davos
5000 m	8:21.6	11 January 1930	Davos
3000 m	4:49.6	29 January 1935	Davos
5000 m	8:17.2	18 January 1936	Oslo
10000 m	17:14.4	6 February 1938	Davos

Source: SpeedSkatingStats.com

=== Personal records ===
To put these personal records in perspective, the Notes column lists the official world records on the dates that Ballangrud skated his personal records.

Personal records
Men's speed skating
Event	Result	Date	Location	Notes
500 m	42.7	31 January 1939	St. Moritz	41.8
1000 m	1:29.3	24 February 1937	Oslo	1:28.4
1500 m	2:14.0	29 January 1939	Davos	2:14.9
3000 m	4:49.6	29 January 1935	Davos	4:59.1
5000 m	8:17.2	18 January 1936	Oslo	8:18.9
10000 m	17:14.4	6 February 1938	Davos	17:17.4

Source: EvertStenlund.se

Note that Ballangrud's personal record on the 1500 m was not a world record because Hans Engnestangen skated 2:13.8 at the same tournament.

Ballangrud has an Adelskalender score of 188.806 points. He was number one on the Adelskalender for a total of 3,675 days, divided over two periods between 1930 and 1942.

== Medals ==
An overview of medals won by Ballangrud at important championships he participated in, listing the years in which he won each:

Championships	Gold medal	Silver medal	Bronze medal
Winter Olympics	1928 (5000 m); 1936 (500 m); 1936 (5000 m); 1936 (10000 m)	1932 (10000 m); 1936 (1500 m)	1928 (1500 m)
World Allround	1926; 1932; 1936; 1938	1928; 1929; 1930; 1935	1931; 1933; 1934
European Allround	1929; 1930; 1933; 1936	–	1927; 1938
Norwegian Allround	1926; 1929; 1930; 1936; 1939	1932; 1935	–

Source: SpeedSkatingStats.com & Skoyteforbundet.no

Records
Preceded by Himself with (Finland) Clas Thunberg	Athlete with the most medals at Winter Olympics; 2 February 1964 – 5 February 1964; With: Clas Thunberg; Sixten Jernberg	Succeeded by (Sweden) Sixten Jernberg
Preceded by (Finland) Clas Thunberg	Athlete with the most medals at Winter Olympics; 14 February 1936 – 2 February 1964; With: Clas Thunberg	Succeeded by Himself with (Finland) Clas Thunberg and (Sweden) Sixten Jernberg
