= Speed skating at the 1936 Winter Olympics =

Speed skating at the IV Olympic Winter Games
- Pictogram for speed skating
- Venue: Riessersee
- Date: 11–14 February 1936
- No. of events: 4
- Competitors: 52 from 16 nations

At the 1936 Winter Olympics, four speed skating events were contested. The competitions were held on Tuesday, 11 February 1936, Wednesday, 12 February 1936, Thursday, 13 February 1936, and on Friday, 14 February 1936.

== Medal summary ==
Medal winner shown below

Event	Gold		Silver		Bronze	
500 metres	Ivar Ballangrud; Norway	43.4	Georg Krog; Norway	43.5	Leo Freisinger; United States	44.0
1500 metres	Charles Mathiesen; Norway	2:19.2 OR	Ivar Ballangrud; Norway	2:20.2	Birger Wasenius; Finland	2:20.9
5000 metres	Ivar Ballangrud; Norway	8:19.6 OR	Birger Wasenius; Finland	8:23.3	Antero Ojala; Finland	8:30.1
10,000 metres	Ivar Ballangrud; Norway	17:24.3 OR	Birger Wasenius; Finland	17:28.2	Max Stiepl; Austria	17:30.0

== Participating nations ==
Seventeen speed skaters competed in all four events.

A total of 52 speed skaters from 16 nations competed at the Garmisch-Partenkirchen Games:

- Australia (1)
- Austria (8)
- Belgium (2)
- Canada (1)
- Czechoslovakia (2)
- Estonia (1)
- Finland (5)
- Germany (2)
- Hungary (1)
- Japan (7)
- Latvia (3)
- Netherlands (5)
- Norway (7)
- Poland (1)
- Sweden (1)
- United States (5)

== Medal table ==
Rank	Nation	Gold	Silver	Bronze	Total
1	Norway	4	2	0	6
2	Finland	0	2	2	4
3	Austria	0	0	1	1
3	United States	0	0	1	1
Totals (4 entries)		4	4	4	12
