= List of 1936 Winter Olympics medal winners =

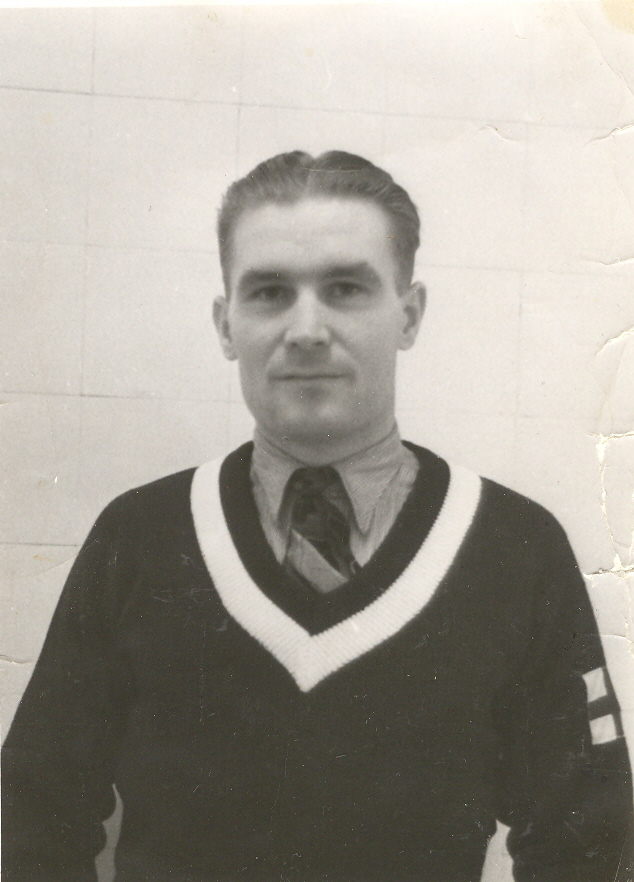
Matti Lähde, a member of Finland's gold medal-winning team in the cross-country 4 × 10 km relay

The 1936 Winter Olympics, officially known by the International Olympic Committee as the IV Olympic Winter Games, were a multi-sport event held in Garmisch-Partenkirchen, Germany, from February 6 through February 16, 1936. A total of 646 athletes representing 28 National Olympic Committees (NOCs) participated at the Games in 17 events across 8 disciplines.

The Olympic programme was changed from that of the 1932 Lake Placid Olympics, with the addition of alpine skiing for both men and women. Two demonstration sports were held—eisschiessen and military patrol. Later added to the regular programme as biathlon, military patrol made its third appearance as a demonstration sport in the Garmisch-Partenkirchen Games. Both men and women participated at these Games, with the women's alpine skiing event being the first medal event women contested at the Winter Olympics outside of figure skating. Two figure skating events for women—ladies' singles and pairs—had been part of the programme since the first Winter Olympics.

A total of 95 athletes won medals at the Games. Norway topped the medal count with fifteen medals, seven of which were gold. Sweden had the second most number of medals with seven, but had one less gold medal than host nation Germany, who had three golds and six overall medals. Austria, Finland, Germany, Great Britain, Norway, Sweden, Switzerland and the United States won medals in more than one event. Athletes from 11 of the 28 participating NOCs won at least a bronze medal; athletes from eight countries won at least one gold. Great Britain's unexpected win in ice hockey remains their only Olympic gold medal in the sport to date.

Sonja Henie of Norway won her third straight gold medal in the ladies' singles figure skating event, her last Olympic medal as she turned professional shortly after the Games. Karl Schäfer of Austria also successfully defended his men's singles figure skating title from Lake Placid. Sweden swept the medals in the cross-country 50 km, as did Norway in the Nordic combined. Norway's Ivar Ballangrud was the most successful athlete, winning three golds and a silver in speed skating and taking his career total to seven Olympic medals. Other multiple medal winners were Oddbjørn Hagen of Norway (one gold, two silvers), Ernst Baier of Germany (one gold, one silver), Joseph Beerli of Switzerland (one gold, one silver), Erik August Larsson of Sweden (one gold, one bronze), Birger Wasenius of Finland (two silvers, one bronze), Olaf Hoffsbakken of Norway (two silvers), Fritz Feierabend of Switzerland (two silvers) and Sverre Brodahl of Norway (one silver, one bronze).

== Alpine skiing ==
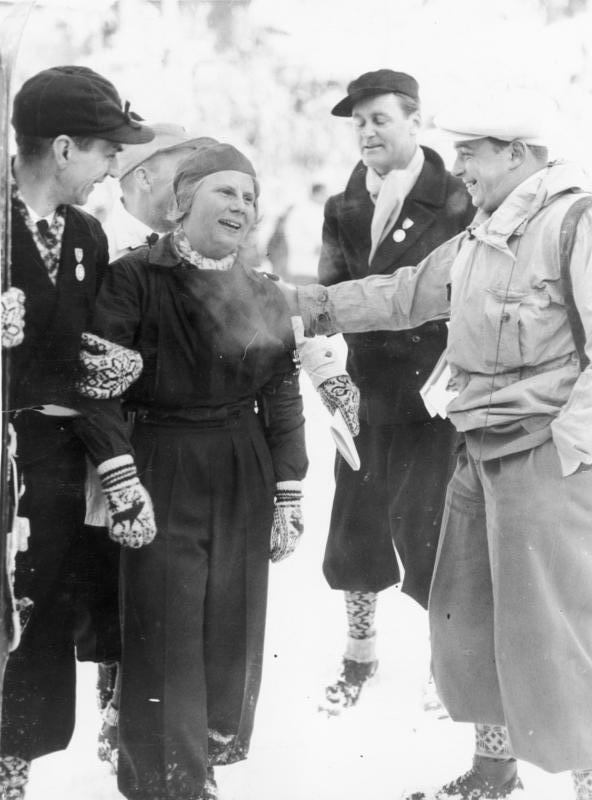
Norwegian Laila Schou Nilsen, the women's combined bronze medallist in alpine skiing

Event	Gold	Silver	Bronze
Men's combined	Franz Pfnür; Germany	Gustav Lantschner; Germany	Émile Allais; France
Women's combined	Christl Cranz; Germany	Käthe Grasegger; Germany	Laila Schou Nilsen; Norway

== Bobsleigh ==
Event	Gold	Silver	Bronze
Two-man	United States; USA I Ivan Brown; Alan Washbond	Switzerland; Switzerland II; Fritz Feierabend; Joseph Beerli	United States; USA II; Gilbert Colgate; Richard Lawrence
Four-man	Switzerland; Switzerland II; Pierre Musy; Arnold Gartmann; Charles Bouvier; Joseph Beerli	Switzerland; Switzerland I Reto Capadrutt; Hans Aichele; Fritz Feierabend; Hans Bütikofer	Great Britain; Great Britain I Frederick McEvoy; James Cardno; Guy Dugdale; Charles Green

== Cross-country skiing ==
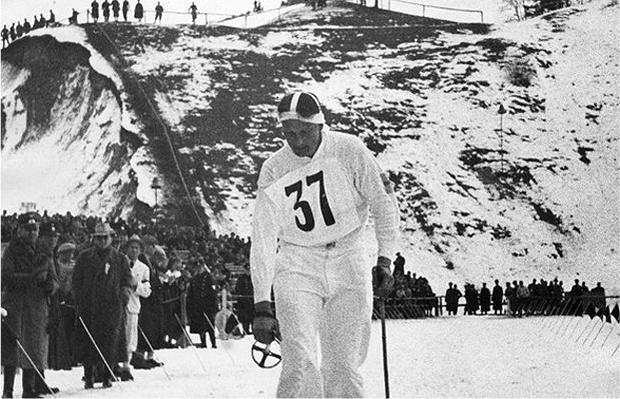
Elis Wiklund, the Swedish gold medallist in the 50 km cross-country skiing race

Event	Gold	Silver	Bronze
18 km	Erik August Larsson; Sweden	Oddbjørn Hagen; Norway	Pekka Niemi; Finland
50 km	Elis Wiklund; Sweden	Axel Wikström; Sweden	Nils-Joel Englund; Sweden
4×10 km relay	Finland; Kalle Jalkanen; Klaes Karppinen; Matti Lähde; Sulo Nurmela	Norway; Sverre Brodahl; Oddbjørn Hagen; Olaf Hoffsbakken; Bjarne Iversen	Sweden; John Berger; Arthur Häggblad; Erik August Larsson; Martin Matsbo

== Figure skating ==
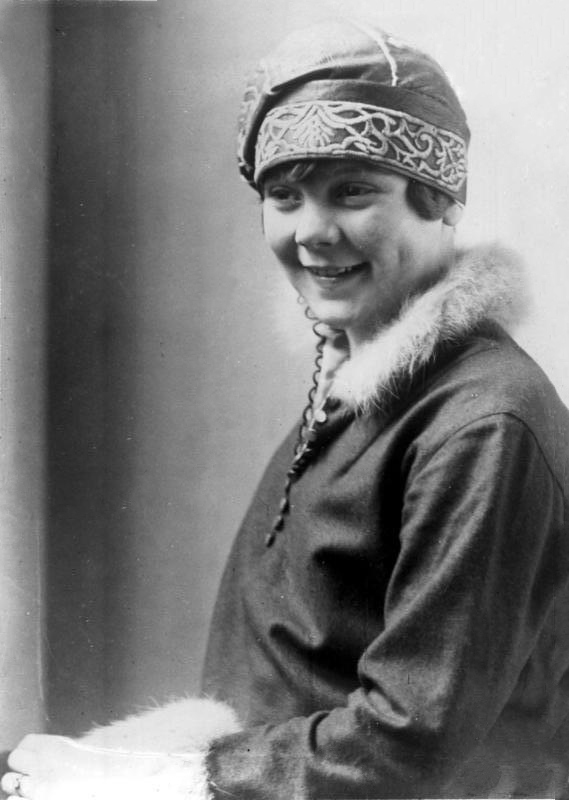
Ladies' singles gold medallist Sonja Henie pictured in 1930. Henie won her third consecutive gold medal in 1936 and turned professional shortly after the Games.

Event	Gold	Silver	Bronze
Men's singles	Karl Schäfer; Austria	Ernst Baier; Germany	Felix Kaspar; Austria
Ladies' singles	Sonja Henie; Norway	Cecilia Colledge; Great Britain	Vivi-Anne Hultén; Sweden
Pairs	Germany; Maxi Herber; Ernst Baier	Austria; Ilse Pausin; Erik Pausin	Hungary; Emília Rotter; László Szollás

== Ice hockey ==
Event	Gold	Silver	Bronze
Men's team	Great Britain; James Foster; Carl Erhardt; Gordon Dailley; Archibald Stinchcombe; Edgar Brenchley; John Coward; James Chappell; Alexander Archer; Gerry Davey; James Borland; Robert Wyman; Jack Kilpatrick	Canada; Francis Moore; Arthur Nash; Herman Murray; Walter Kitchen; Raymond Milton; David Neville; Kenneth Farmer; Hugh Farquharson; Maxwell Deacon; Alexander Sinclair; Bill Thomson; James Haggarty; Ralph St. Germain	United States; Thomas Moone; Frank Shaughnessy, Jr. Philip LaBatte; Frank Stubbs; John Garrison; Paul Rowe; John Lax; Gordon Smith; Elbridge Ross; Francis Spain; August Kammer

== Nordic combined ==
Event	Gold	Silver	Bronze
Men's individual	Oddbjørn Hagen; Norway	Olaf Hoffsbakken; Norway	Sverre Brodahl; Norway

== Ski jumping ==
Event	Gold	Silver	Bronze
Men's individual	Birger Ruud; Norway	Sven Eriksson; Sweden	Reidar Andersen; Norway

== Speed skating ==
Event	Gold	Silver	Bronze
500 metres	Ivar Ballangrud; Norway	Georg Krog; Norway	Leo Freisinger; United States
1500 metres	Charles Mathiesen; Norway	Ivar Ballangrud; Norway	Birger Wasenius; Finland
5000 metres	Ivar Ballangrud; Norway	Birger Wasenius; Finland	Antero Ojala; Finland
10000 metres	Ivar Ballangrud; Norway	Birger Wasenius; Finland	Max Stiepl; Austria

== Multiple medallists ==
Athletes who won multiple medals are listed below.

Athlete	Nation	Sport	Gold	Silver	Bronze	Total
Ivar Ballangrud	Norway	Speed skating	3	1	0	4
Oddbjørn Hagen	Norway	Cross-country skiing Nordic combined	1	2	0	3
Ernst Baier	Germany	Figure skating	1	1	0	2
Joseph Beerli	Switzerland	Bobsleigh	1	1	0	2
Erik August Larsson	Sweden	Cross-country skiing	1	0	1	2
Birger Wasenius	Finland	Speed skating	0	2	1	3
Fritz Feierabend	Switzerland	Bobsleigh	0	2	0	2
Olaf Hoffsbakken	Norway	Cross-country skiing Nordic combined	0	2	0	2
Sverre Brodahl	Norway	Cross-country skiing Nordic combined	0	1	1	2

== See also ==
- 1936 Winter Olympics medal table
