= Cross-country skiing at the 1936 Winter Olympics – Men's 4 × 10 kilometre relay =

Men's 4 × 10 kilometre relay at the IV Olympic Winter Games
- Cross-country skiing
- Date: 10 February 1936
- Competitors: 64 from 16 nations
- Winning time: 2:41:33

Medalists
| 1st place, gold medalist(s) | | Sulo Nurmela; Klaes Karppinen; Matti Lähde; Kalle Jalkanen | Finland |
| 2nd place, silver medalist(s) | | Oddbjørn Hagen; Olaf Hoffsbakken; Sverre Brodahl; Bjarne Iversen | Norway |
| 3rd place, bronze medalist(s) | | John Berger; Erik August Larsson; Arthur Häggblad; Martin Matsbo | Sweden |

The men's 4 × 10 kilometre relay cross-country skiing event was part of the cross-country skiing at the 1936 Winter Olympics programme. The competition was held on Monday, 10 February 1936. Sixty-four cross-country skiers from 16 nations competed.

== Background ==
This was the Olympic debut for the event. The cross country relay had been held at the past three Nordic World Ski Championships. Finland was the 1935 world champion.

== Results ==
| Rank | Bib | Country | Competitor | Leg | | Overall | | |
| Rank | Bib | Country | Competitor | Time | Rank | Time | Rank | Margin |
|---|---|---|---|---|---|---|---|---|
| 1st place, gold medalist(s) | 1 | Finland | | | | 2:41:33 | | 6 |
| 1st place, gold medalist(s) | 3-1 | Finland | Sulo Nurmela | 42:34 | 19 | 42:34 | 2 | +1:02 |
| 1st place, gold medalist(s) | 3-2 | Finland | Klaes Karppinen | 39:56 | 6 | 1:22:30 | 3 | +1:25 |
| 1st place, gold medalist(s) | 3-3 | Finland | Matti Lähde | 39:49 | 4 | 2:02:19 | 2 | +1:22 |
| 1st place, gold medalist(s) | 3-4 | Finland | Kalle Jalkanen | 39:14 | 1 | 2:41:33 | 1 | 6 |
| 2nd place, silver medalist(s) | 13 | Norway | | | | 2:41:39 | | +6 |
| 2nd place, silver medalist(s) | 13-1 | Norway | Oddbjørn Hagen | 41:32 | 13 | 41:32 | 1 | 1:02 |
| 2nd place, silver medalist(s) | 13-2 | Norway | Olaf Hoffsbakken | 39:33 | 2 | 1:21:05 | 1 | 1:23 |
| 2nd place, silver medalist(s) | 13-3 | Norway | Sverre Brodahl | 39:52 | 5 | 2:00:57 | 1 | 1:22 |
| 2nd place, silver medalist(s) | 13-4 | Norway | Bjarne Iversen | 40:42 | 9 | 2:41:39 | 2 | +6 |
| 3rd place, bronze medalist(s) | 1 | Sweden | | | | 2:43:03 | | +1:30 |
| 3rd place, bronze medalist(s) | 1-1 | Sweden | John Berger | 42:49 | 20 | 42:49 | 3 | +1:17 |
| 3rd place, bronze medalist(s) | 1-2 | Sweden | Erik August Larsson | 39:39 | 3 | 1:22:28 | 2 | +1:23 |
| 3rd place, bronze medalist(s) | 1-3 | Sweden | Arthur Häggblad | 40:34 | 8 | 2:03:02 | 3 | +2:05 |
| 3rd place, bronze medalist(s) | 1-4 | Sweden | Martin Matsbo | 40:01 | 7 | 2:43:03 | 3 | +1:30 |
| 4 | 5 | Italy | | | | 2:50:05 | | +8:32 |
| 4 | 5-1 | Italy | Giulio Gerardi | 43:59 | 25 | 43:59 | 4 | +2:27 |
| 4 | 5-2 | Italy | Severino Menardi | 40:59 | 10 | 1:24:58 | 4 | +3:53 |
| 4 | 5-3 | Italy | Vincenzo Demetz | 41:51 | 15 | 2:06:49 | 4 | +5:52 |
| 4 | 5-4 | Italy | Giovanni Kasebacher | 43:16 | 22 | 2:50:05 | 4 | +8:32 |
| 5 | 2 | Czechoslovakia | | | | 2:51:56 | | +10:23 |
| 5 | 2-1 | Czechoslovakia | Cyril Musil | 45:50 | 36 | 45:50 | 5 | +4:18 |
| 5 | 2-2 | Czechoslovakia | Gustl Berauer | 42:14 | 16 | 1:28:04 | 5 | +6:59 |
| 5 | 2-3 | Czechoslovakia | Lukáš Mihalák | 41:27 | 11 | 2:09:31 | 5 | +8:34 |
| 5 | 2-4 | Czechoslovakia | František Šimůnek | 42:25 | 17 | 2:51:56 | 5 | +10:23 |
| 6 | 16 | Germany | | | | 2:54:54 | | +13:21 |
| 6 | 16-1 | Germany | Friedl Däuber | 49:22 | 48 | 49:22 | 10 | +7:50 |
| 6 | 16-2 | Germany | Willy Bogner | 41:29 | 12 | 1:30:51 | 7 | +9:46 |
| 6 | 16-3 | Germany | Herbert Leupold | 41:37 | 14 | 2:12:28 | 6 | +11:31 |
| 6 | 16-4 | Germany | Toni Zeller | 42:26 | 18 | 2:54:54 | 6 | +13:21 |
| 7 | 4 | Poland | | | | 2:58:50 | | +17:17 |
| 7 | 4-1 | Poland | Michał Górski | 46:37 | 39 | 46:37 | 6 | +5:05 |
| 7 | 4-2 | Poland | Marian Woyna-Orlewicz | 42:55 | 21 | 1:29:32 | 6 | +8:27 |
| 7 | 4-3 | Poland | Stanisław Karpiel | 44:35 | 28 | 2:14:07 | 7 | +13:10 |
| 7 | 4-4 | Poland | Bronisław Czech | 44:43 | 29 | 2:58:50 | 7 | +17:17 |
| 8 | 11 | Austria | | | | 3:02:48 | | +21:15 |
| 8 | 11-1 | Austria | Alfred Rössner | 49:19 | 47 | 49:19 | 9 | +7:47 |
| 8 | 11-2 | Austria | Harald Bosio | 45:00 | 31 | 1:34:19 | 10 | +13:14 |
| 8 | 11-3 | Austria | Erich Gallwitz | 45:13 | 33 | 2:19:32 | 10 | +18:35 |
| 8 | 11-4 | Austria | Hans Baumann | 43:16 | 23 | 3:02:48 | 8 | +21:15 |
| 9 | 10 | France | | | | 3:03:33 | | +22:00 |
| 9 | 10-1 | France | Robert Gindre | 47:15 | 40 | 47:15 | 7 | +5:43 |
| 9 | 10-2 | France | Fernand Mermoud | 46:06 | 38 | 1:33:21 | 8 | +12:16 |
| 9 | 10-3 | France | Léonce Crétin | 44:23 | 26 | 2:17:44 | 8 | +16:47 |
| 9 | 10-4 | France | Alfred Jacomis | 45:49 | 34 | 3:03:33 | 9 | +22:00 |
| 10 | 6 | Yugoslavia | | | | 3:04:38 | | +23:05 |
| 10 | 6-1 | Yugoslavia | Leon Knap | 48:34 | 46 | 48:34 | 8 | +7:02 |
| 10 | 6-2 | Yugoslavia | Avgust Jakopič | 47:22 | 41 | 1:35:56 | 11 | +14:51 |
| 10 | 6-3 | Yugoslavia | Alojz Klančnik | 44:51 | 30 | 2:20:47 | 11 | +19:50 |
| 10 | 6-4 | Yugoslavia | Franc Smolej | 43:51 | 24 | 3:04:38 | 10 | +23:05 |
| 11 | 8 | United States | | | | 3:06:26 | | +24:53 |
| 11 | 8-1 | United States | Birger Torrissen | 49:25 | 49 | 49:25 | 11 | +7:53 |
| 11 | 8-2 | United States | Warren Chivers | 44:24 | 27 | 1:33:49 | 9 | +12:44 |
| 11 | 8-3 | United States | Richard E. Parsons | 45:02 | 32 | 2:18:51 | 9 | +17:54 |
| 11 | 8-4 | United States | Karl Satre | 47:35 | 42 | 3:06:26 | 11 | +24:53 |
| 12 | 9 | Japan | | | | 3:10:59 | | +29:26 |
| 12 | 9-1 | Japan | Ginzo Yamada | 51:38 | 53 | 51:38 | 12 | +10:06 |
| 12 | 9-2 | Japan | Tsutomu Sekido | 45:49 | 35 | 1:37:27 | 12 | +16:22 |
| 12 | 9-3 | Japan | Shinzo Yamada | 45:57 | 37 | 2:23:24 | 12 | +22:27 |
| 12 | 9-4 | Japan | Hiroshi Tadano | 47:35 | 43 | 3:10:59 | 12 | +29:26 |
| 13 | 15 | Latvia | | | | 3:26:08 | | +44:35 |
| 13 | 15-1 | Latvia | Herberts Dāboliņš | 54:25 | 59 | 54:25 | 14 | +12:53 |
| 13 | 15-2 | Latvia | Pauls Kaņeps | 50:15 | 50 | 1:44:40 | 13 | +23:35 |
| 13 | 15-3 | Latvia | Edgars Gruzītis | 48:25 | 44 | 2:33:05 | 13 | +32:08 |
| 13 | 15-4 | Latvia | Alberts Riekstiņš | 53:03 | 57 | 3:26:08 | 13 | +44:35 |
| 14 | 14 | Romania | | | | 3:27:50 | | +46:17 |
| 14 | 14-1 | Romania | Wilhelm Zacharias | 56:56 | 60 | 56:56 | 15 | +15:24 |
| 14 | 14-2 | Romania | Iosif Covaci | 50:23 | 51 | 1:47:19 | 15 | +26:14 |
| 14 | 14-3 | Romania | Ioan Coman | 48:32 | 45 | 2:35:51 | 14 | +34:54 |
| 14 | 14-4 | Romania | Rudolf Klöckner | 51:59 | 54 | 3:27:50 | 14 | +46:17 |
| 15 | 12 | Bulgaria | | | | 3:29:39 | | +48:06 |
| 15 | 12-1 | Bulgaria | Hristo Kochov | 52:32 | 56 | 52:32 | 13 | +11:00 |
| 15 | 12-2 | Bulgaria | Ivan Angelakov | 52:08 | 55 | 1:44:40 | 13 | +23:35 |
| 15 | 12-3 | Bulgaria | Dimitar Kostov | 53:59 | 58 | 2:38:39 | 15 | +37:42 |
| 15 | 12-4 | Bulgaria | Racho Zhekov | 51:00 | 52 | 3:29:39 | 15 | +48:06 |
| DNF | 7 | Turkey | | | | Did not finish | | |
| DNF | 7-1 | Turkey | Reşat Erceş | 1:14:59 | 63 | 1:14:59 | 16 | +33:27 |
| DNF | 7-2 | Turkey | Sadri Erkılıç | 1:04:06 | 61 | 2:19:05 | 16 | +58:00 |
| DNF | 7-3 | Turkey | Cemal Tiğin | 1:10:26 | 62 | 3:29:31 | 16 | +1:28:34 |
| DNF | 7-4 | Turkey | Mahmut Şevket | Did not finish | | | | |
