= Nordic skiing at the 1936 Winter Olympics =

At the 1936 Winter Olympics, five Nordic skiing events were contested – three cross-country skiing events, one ski jumping event, and one Nordic combined event, all for men only.

In cross-country skiing Erik August Larsson of Sweden won the 18 km while Elis Wiklund, also of Sweden, won the 50 km. The winners for the 4x10 km relay in cross-country skiing were the Finnish team, which consisted of Klaus Karppinen, Kalle Jalkanen, Matti Lähde, and Sulo Nurmela. In ski jumping, Birger Ruud of Norway won the only event which was the large hill. In the Nordic combined, Oddbjørn Hagen of Norway won the only event, which was individual.

Nordic skiing discipline	Men's events
Cross-country skiing	• 18 km
Cross-country skiing	• 50 km
Cross-country skiing	• 4 × 10 km relay
Ski jumping	• Large hill (80m)
Nordic combined	• Individual
