= Sweden at the 1936 Winter Olympics =

- IOC code: SWE
- NOC: Swedish Olympic Committee
- Website: www.sok.se (in Swedish and English)

in Garmisch-Partenkirchen
- Competitors: 32 (31 men, 1 woman) in 7 sports
- Flag bearer: Sven Selånger (ski jumping)
- Medals Ranked 3rd: Gold 2 Silver 2 Bronze 3 Total 7

Winter Olympics appearances (overview)
- 1924; 1928; 1932; 1936; 1948; 1952; 1956; 1960; 1964; 1968; 1972; 1976; 1980; 1984; 1988; 1992; 1994; 1998; 2002; 2006; 2010; 2014; 2018; 2022; 2026

Sweden competed at the 1936 Winter Olympics in Garmisch-Partenkirchen, Germany.

== Medalists ==
Medal	Name	Sport	Event
Gold	Erik August Larsson	Cross-country skiing	Men's 18 km
Gold	Elis Wiklund	Cross-country skiing	Men's 50 km
Silver	Axel Wikström	Cross-country skiing	Men's 50 km
Silver	Sven Selånger	Ski jumping	Men's normal hill (K90 individual 70m)
Bronze	Martin Matsbo; John Berger; Erik August Larsson; Arthur Häggblad	Cross-country skiing	Men's 4 x 10 km relay
Bronze	Nils-Joel Englund	Cross-country skiing	Men's 50 km
Bronze	Vivi-Anne Hultén	Figure skating	Women's singles

== Alpine skiing ==
Men

Athlete	Event	Downhill		Slalom			Total	
Athlete	Event	Time	Rank	Time 1	Time 2	Rank	Total points	Rank
Bertil Persson	Combined	6:26.0	35	1:43.4 (+0:06)	1:54.0 (+0:06)	30	70.95	31

== Cross-country skiing ==
Men

Event	Athlete	Race	
Event	Athlete	Time	Rank
18 km	Ivan Lindgren	1'21:04	17
18 km	Arthur Häggblad	1'18:55	8
18 km	Martin Matsbo	1'17:02	4
18 km	Erik Larsson	1'14:38	1st place, gold medalist(s)
50 km	Hjalmar Bergström	3'35:50	4
50 km	Nils Englund	3'34:10	3rd place, bronze medalist(s)
50 km	Axel Wikström	3'33:20	2nd place, silver medalist(s)
50 km	Elis Wiklund	3'30:11	1st place, gold medalist(s)

Men's 4 x 10 km relay

Athletes	Race	
Athletes	Time	Rank
John Berger; Erik August Larsson; Arthur Häggblad; Martin Matsbo	2'43:03	3rd place, bronze medalist(s)

== Figure skating ==
Women

Athlete	Event	CF	FS	Places	Points	Final rank
Vivi-Anne Hultén	Women's singles	4	4	28	394.7	3rd place, bronze medalist(s)

== Ice hockey ==
Summary

Team	Event	First round				Second round				Final round		
Team	Event	Opposition Score	Opposition Score	Opposition Score	Rank	Opposition Score	Opposition Score	Opposition Score	Rank	Opposition Score	Opposition Score	Rank
Sweden men's	Men's tournament	Great Britain; L 0–1	Japan; W 2–0	—N/a	2 Q	Austria; W 1–0	Czechoslovakia; L 1–4	United States; L 1–2	3	did not advance		5

=== Group D ===
Top two teams advanced to semifinals

	Pld	W	L	T	GF	GA	Pts
Great Britain	2	2	0	0	4	0	4
Sweden	2	1	1	0	2	1	2
Japan	2	0	2	0	0	5	0

6 February	Great Britain	1-0 (1-0,0-0,0-0)	Sweden
8 February	Sweden	2-0 (1-0,1-0,0-0)	Japan

=== Group B ===
Top two teams advanced to Medal Round

	Pld	W	L	T	GF	GA	Pts
United States	3	3	0	0	5	1	6
Czechoslovakia	3	2	1	0	6	4	4
Sweden	3	1	0	2	3	6	2
Austria	3	0	3	0	1	4	0

11 February	Sweden	1-0 (1-0,0-0,0-0)	Austria
12 February	Czechoslovakia	4-1 (0-1,2-0,2-0)	Sweden
13 February	United States	2-1 (0-0,1-1,1-0)	Sweden

Contestants; Herman Carlsson; Sven Bergguist; Bertil Lundell; Holger Engberg; Torsten Jöhncke; Yngve Liljeberg; Bertil Norberg; Wilhelm Petersén; Åke Ericson; Stig Andersson; Lennart Hellman; Wilhelm Larsson; Ruben Carlsson

== Nordic combined ==
Events:

- 18 km cross-country skiing
- normal hill ski jumping

The cross-country skiing part of this event was combined with the main medal event of cross-country skiing. Those results can be found above in this article in the cross-country skiing section. Some athletes (but not all) entered in both the cross-country skiing and Nordic combined event, their time on the 18 km was used for both events.

The ski jumping (normal hill) event was held separate from the main medal event of ski jumping, results can be found in the table below.

Athlete	Event	Cross-country			Ski Jumping				Total	
Athlete	Event	Time	Points	Rank	Distance 1	Distance 2	Total points	Rank	Points	Rank
Holger Lundgren	Individual	1'29:57	161.2	31	50.0	53.0	152.0	42	313.2	40
Hasse Hedjerson	Individual	1'25:50	182.4	22	DNS	–	–	–	DNF	–
Jonas Westman	Individual	1'25:38	183.4	20	47.5	46.5	199.3	10	382.7	11

== Ski jumping ==
Athlete	Event	Jump 1			Jump 2			Total	
Athlete	Event	Distance	Points	Rank	Distance	Points	Rank	Points	Rank
Axel Östrand	Normal hill	61.0	97.8	30	68.0	105.6	13	203.4	22
Sixten Johansson	Normal hill	63.0	101.5	21	66.0	104.6	15	206.1	15
Nils Hjelmström	Normal hill	68.0	105.1	13	62.5	99.7	27	204.8	16
Sven Eriksson	Normal hill	76.0	115.5	1	76.0	115.0	3	230.5	2nd place, silver medalist(s)

== Speed skating ==
Men

Event	Athlete	Race	
Event	Athlete	Time	Rank
500 m	Axel Johansson	46.1	18
1500 m	Axel Johansson	2:29.9	29
5000 m	Axel Johansson	9:06.4	26
10,000 m	Axel Johansson	18:38.2	22
