= Yugoslavia at the 1936 Winter Olympics =

- Flag of the Kingdom of Yugoslavia
- IOC code: YUG
- NOC: Yugoslav Olympic Committee

in Garmisch-Partenkirchen
- Competitors: 17 (men) in 4 sports
- Medals: Gold 0 Silver 0 Bronze 0 Total 0

Winter Olympics appearances (overview)
- 1924; 1928; 1932; 1936; 1948; 1952; 1956; 1960; 1964; 1968; 1972; 1976; 1980; 1984; 1988; 1992; 1994; 1998; 2002

Other related appearances
- Croatia (1992–); Slovenia (1992–); Bosnia and Herzegovina (1994–); North Macedonia (1998–); Serbia and Montenegro (1998–2006); Montenegro (2010–); Serbia (2010–); Kosovo (2018–)

Athletes from the Kingdom of Yugoslavia competed at the 1936 Winter Olympics in Garmisch-Partenkirchen, Germany. Yugoslavia returned to the Winter Olympic Games after having missed the 1932 Winter Olympics.

== Alpine skiing ==
Men

Athlete	Event	Downhill		Slalom			Total	
Athlete	Event	Time	Rank	Time 1	Time 2	Rank	Total points	Rank
Hubert Hajm	Combined	DNF	–	–	–	–	DNF	–
Emil Žnidar	Combined	8:02.2	50	1:50.7	1:58.1	31	61.84	33
Franci Čop	Combined	6:13.6	31	1:38.5	1:37.4	22	75.88	25
Ciril Praček	Combined	5:39.4	16	1:34.4	1:32.6	17	81.54	15

== Cross-country skiing ==
Men

Event	Athlete	Race	
Event	Athlete	Time	Rank
18 km	Leon Knap	1'28:31	44
18 km	Avgust Jakopič	1'26:48	38
18 km	Franc Smolej	1'24:03	25
18 km	Alojz Klančnik	1'23:18	23
50 km	Lado Sencar	4'20:20	31
50 km	Leon Knap	3'59:17	21
50 km	Lovro Žemva	3'59:13	20
50 km	Franc Smolej	3'47:40	10

Men's 4 x 10 km relay

Athletes	Race	
Athletes	Time	Rank
Leon Knap; Avgust Jakopič; Alojz Klančnik; Franc Smolej	3'04:38	10

== Nordic combined ==
Events:

- 18 km cross-country skiing
- normal hill ski jumping

The cross-country skiing part of this event was combined with the main medal event of cross-country skiing. Those results can be found above in this article in the cross-country skiing section. Some athletes (but not all) entered in both the cross-country skiing and Nordic combined event, their time on the 18 km was used for both events.

The ski jumping (normal hill) event was held separate from the main medal event of ski jumping, results can be found in the table below.

Athlete	Event	Cross-country			Ski Jumping				Total	
Athlete	Event	Time	Points	Rank	Distance 1	Distance 2	Total points	Rank	Points	Rank
Rado Istenič	Individual	DNF	–	–	–	–	–	–	DNF	–
Leon Bebler	Individual	1'34:25	139.2	43	41.0	42.0	177.5	32	316.7	38
Albin Jakopič	Individual	1'30:02	160.8	32	37.5	42.0	166.9	39	327.7	36
Tone Dečman	Individual	1'29:44	162.3	30	41.0	42.5	169.1	38	331.4	34

== Ski jumping ==
Athlete	Event	Jump 1			Jump 2			Total	
Athlete	Event	Distance	Points	Rank	Distance	Points	Rank	Points	Rank
Albin Jakopič	Normal hill	52.0	78.0	45	53.0	78.1	44	156.1	44
Albin Novšak	Normal hill	54.0	86.0	43	58.5	88.0	41	174.0	41
Franc Pribošek	Normal hill	59.0	87.8	39	55.0	88.1	40	175.9	39
Franc Palme	Normal hill	61.0	87.8	39	55.0	81.1	43	168.9	43
