= Latvia at the 1936 Winter Olympics =

- IOC code: LAT
- NOC: Latvian Olympic Committee
- Website: www.olimpiade.lv (in Latvian and English)

in Garmisch-Partenkirchen
- Competitors: 26 (23 men, 3 women) in 6 sports
- Flag bearer: Leonīds Vedējs
- Medals: Gold 0 Silver 0 Bronze 0 Total 0

Winter Olympics appearances (overview)
- 1924; 1928; 1932; 1936; 1948–1988; 1992; 1994; 1998; 2002; 2006; 2010; 2014; 2018; 2022; 2026

Other related appearances
- Soviet Union (1956–1988)

Latvia competed at the 1936 Winter Olympics in Garmisch-Partenkirchen, Germany. The nation returned to the Winter Games after having missed the 1932 Winter Olympics. These Games would be the last time that Latvia would compete at the Winter Games as an independent nation until the 1992 Winter Olympics. After the nation was annexed by the Soviet Union in 1940, Latvian athletes would compete at the Olympic Games as part of the USSR delegations.

== Alpine skiing ==
Men

Athlete	Event	Downhill		Slalom			Total	
Athlete	Event	Time	Rank	Time 1	Time 2	Rank	Total points	Rank
Askolds Hermanovskis	Combined	13:22.4	56	3:18.0 (+0:12)	DSQ	–	DNF	–
Herberts Bērtulsons	Combined	13:00.6	55	3:06.1	DSQ	–	DNF	–

Women

Athlete	Event	Downhill		Slalom			Total	
Athlete	Event	Time	Rank	Time 1	Time 2	Rank	Total points	Rank
Mirdza Martinsone	Combined	15:21.6	36	3:08.3 (+0:12)	DSQ	–	DNF	–

== Cross-country skiing ==
Men

Event	Athlete	Race	
Event	Athlete	Time	Rank
18 km	Kārlis Bukass	1'42:57	69
18 km	Alberts Riekstiņš	1'42:16	67
18 km	Herberts Dāboliņš	1'34:20	58
18 km	Pauls Kaņeps	1'31:44	50

Men's 4 x 10 km relay

Athletes	Race	
Athletes	Time	Rank
Herberts Dāboliņš; Pauls Kaņeps; Edgars Gruzītis; Alberts Riekstiņš	3'26:08	13

== Figure skating ==
Men

Athlete	Event	CF	FS	Places	Points	Final rank
Verners Auls	Men's singles	25	25	175	222.6	25

Women

Athlete	Event	CF	FS	Places	Points	Final rank
Alise Dzeguze	Women's singles	24	23	161	280.9	23

Pairs

Athletes	Points	Score	Final rank
Hildegarde Švarce-Gešela; Eduards Gešels	149	7.5	17

== Ice hockey ==
=== Group A ===
Top two teams advanced to semifinals

	Pld	W	L	T	GF	GA	Pts
Canada	3	3	0	0	24	3	6
Austria	3	2	1	0	11	7	4
Poland	3	1	2	0	11	12	2
Latvia	3	0	3	0	3	27	0

7 February	Canada	11-0 (2-0,3-0,6-0)	Latvia
8 February	Poland	9-2 (1-0,4-0,4-2)	Latvia
9 February	Austria	7-1 (4-0,0-0,3-1)	Latvia

Contestants; Aleksejs Auziņš; Reinis Bluķis; Arvīds Jurgens; Herberts Kušķis; Roberts Lapainis; Kārlis Paegle; Arvīds Petersons; Ādolfs Petrovskis; Jānis Rozīte; Leonīds Vedējs; Jānis Bebris

== Nordic combined ==
Events:

- 18 km cross-country skiing
- normal hill ski jumping

The cross-country skiing part of this event was combined with the main medal event of cross-country skiing. Those results can be found above in this article in the cross-country skiing section. Some athletes (but not all) entered in both the cross-country skiing and Nordic combined event, their time on the 18 km was used for both events.

The ski jumping (normal hill) event was held separate from the main medal event of ski jumping, results can be found in the table below.

Athlete	Event	Cross-country			Ski Jumping				Total	
Athlete	Event	Time	Points	Rank	Distance 1	Distance 2	Total points	Rank	Points	Rank
Edgars Gruzītis	Individual	1'35:22	134.6	44	35.0	36.5	148.1	43	282.7	42

== Speed skating ==
Men

Event	Athlete	Race	
Event	Athlete	Time	Rank
500 m	Jānis Andriksons	45.9	16
500 m	Alfons Bērziņš	45.7	14
1500 m	Jānis Andriksons	2:28.9	23
1500 m	Alfons Bērziņš	2:25.8	18
5000 m	Jānis Andriksons	9:15.0	30
5000 m	Arvids Lejnieks	9:11.9	29
5000 m	Alfons Bērziņš	8:53.4	18
10,000 m	Arvids Lejnieks	18:41.2	23
10,000 m	Alfons Bērziņš	18:22.5	19

== Sources ==
- Peter von le Fort, ed. (1936). IV. Olympische Winterspiele 1936 Amtlicher Bericht (PDF) (in German). Berlin: Reichssportverlag. Archived from the original (PDF) on 2007-08-09.
- Olympic Winter Games 1936, full results by sports-reference.com
