= Poland at the 1936 Winter Olympics =

- IOC code: POL
- NOC: Polish Olympic Committee
- Website: www.pkol.pl (in Polish)

in Garmisch-Partenkirchen
- Competitors: 20 (men) in 6 sports
- Flag bearer: Bronisław Czech
- Medals: Gold 0 Silver 0 Bronze 0 Total 0

Winter Olympics appearances (overview)
- 1924; 1928; 1932; 1936; 1948; 1952; 1956; 1960; 1964; 1968; 1972; 1976; 1980; 1984; 1988; 1992; 1994; 1998; 2002; 2006; 2010; 2014; 2018; 2022; 2026

Poland competed at the 1936 Winter Olympics in Garmisch-Partenkirchen, Germany.

== Alpine skiing ==
Men

Athlete	Event	Downhill		Slalom			Total	
Athlete	Event	Time	Rank	Time 1	Time 2	Rank	Total points	Rank
Fedor Weinschenk	Combined	6:26.0	35	1:56.6 (+0:06)	2:21.2	33	65.67	32
Karol Zając	Combined	6:20.6	34	1:35.0	1:42.5	23	74.87	28
Bronisław Czech	Combined	5:46.4	20	1:30.4	1:42.9	19	79.41	20

== Cross-country skiing ==
Men

Event	Athlete	Race	
Event	Athlete	Time	Rank
18 km	Stanisław Karpiel	1'27:31	42
18 km	Bronisław Czech	1'25:55	33
18 km	Marian Orlewicz	1'25:27	32
18 km	Michał Górski	1'23:11	22
50 km	Stanisław Karpiel	4'06:26	26

Men's 4 x 10 km relay

Athletes	Race	
Athletes	Time	Rank
Michał Górski; Marian Woyna-Orlewicz; Stanisław Karpiel; Bronisław Czech	2'58:50	7

== Ice hockey ==
=== Group A ===
Top two teams advanced to semifinals

	Pld	W	L	T	GF	GA	Pts
Canada	3	3	0	0	24	3	6
Austria	3	2	1	0	11	7	4
Poland	3	1	2	0	11	12	2
Latvia	3	0	3	0	3	27	0

6 February	Canada	8-1 (5-0,2-1,1-0)	Poland
7 February	Austria	2-1 (0-0,0-0,2-1)	Poland
8 February	Poland	9-2 (1-0,4-0,4-2)	Latvia

- Team Roster

- Józef Stogowski
- Henryk Przeździecki
- Witalis Ludwiczak
- Kazimierz Sokolowski
- Czesław Marchewczyk
- Adam Kowalski
- Andrzej Wołkowski
- Edmund Zieliński
- Władysław Król
- Mieczysław Kasprzycki
- Roman Stupnicki

== Nordic combined ==
Events:

- 18 km cross-country skiing
- normal hill ski jumping

The cross-country skiing part of this event was combined with the main medal event of cross-country skiing. Those results can be found above in this article in the cross-country skiing section. Some athletes (but not all) entered in both the cross-country skiing and Nordic combined event, their time on the 18 km was used for both events.

The ski jumping (normal hill) event was held separate from the main medal event of ski jumping, results can be found in the table below.

Athlete	Event	Cross-country			Ski Jumping				Total	
Athlete	Event	Time	Points	Rank	Distance 1	Distance 2	Total points	Rank	Points	Rank
Andrzej Marusarz	Individual	1'31:30	153.4	36	46.0	47.0	192.1	12	345.5	32
Bronisław Czech	Individual	1'25:55	181.9	23	46.0	45.5	193.1	11	375.0	16
Stanisław Marusarz	Individual	1'25:27	184.4	18	51.0	50.0	208.9	3	393.3	7
Marian Orlewicz	Individual	1'25:27	184.4	18	41.0	43.0	179.4	31	363.8	24

== Ski jumping ==
Athlete	Event	Jump 1			Jump 2			Total	
Athlete	Event	Distance	Points	Rank	Distance	Points	Rank	Points	Rank
Bronisław Czech	Normal hill	62.5	95.2	35	63.5	97.8	30	193.0	33
Andrzej Marusarz	Normal hill	66.0	102.6	16	66.0	101.1	23	203.7	21
Stanisław Marusarz	Normal hill	73.0	109.4	7	75.5	112.2	5	221.6	5

== Speed skating ==
Men

Event	Athlete	Race	
Event	Athlete	Time	Rank
5000 m	Jan Kalbarczyk	8:47.7	12
10,000 m	Jan Kalbarczyk	17:54.0	9
