= 1936 Winter Olympics medal table =

1936 Winter Olympics medals
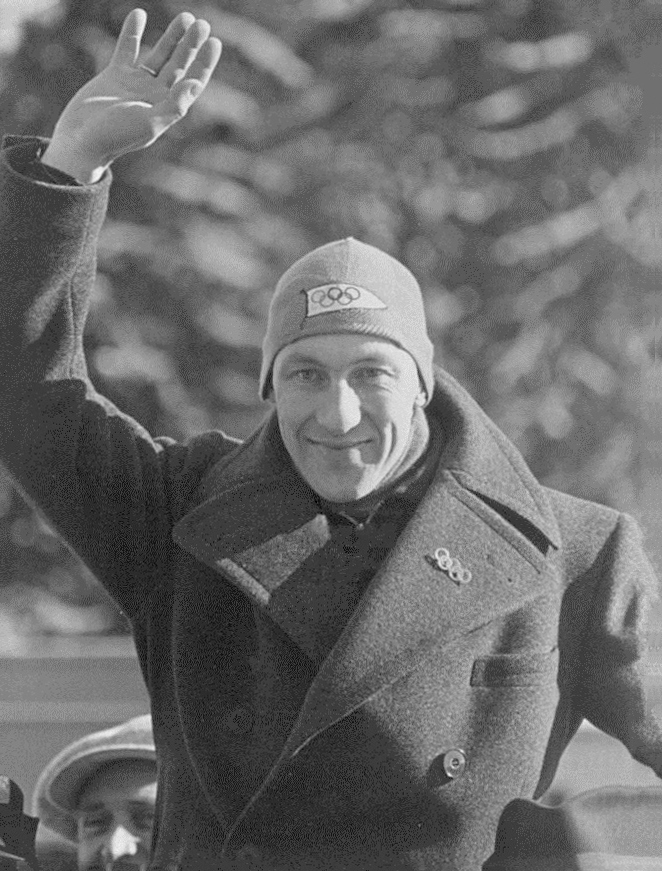
- Ivar Ballangrud of Norway won the most gold medals and overall medals for an individual at the 1936 Winter Olympics, winning three and four respectively in men's speed skating.
- Location: Garmisch-Partenkirchen, Germany

Highlights
- Most gold medals: Norway (7)
- Most total medals: Norway (15)
- Medalling NOCs: 11

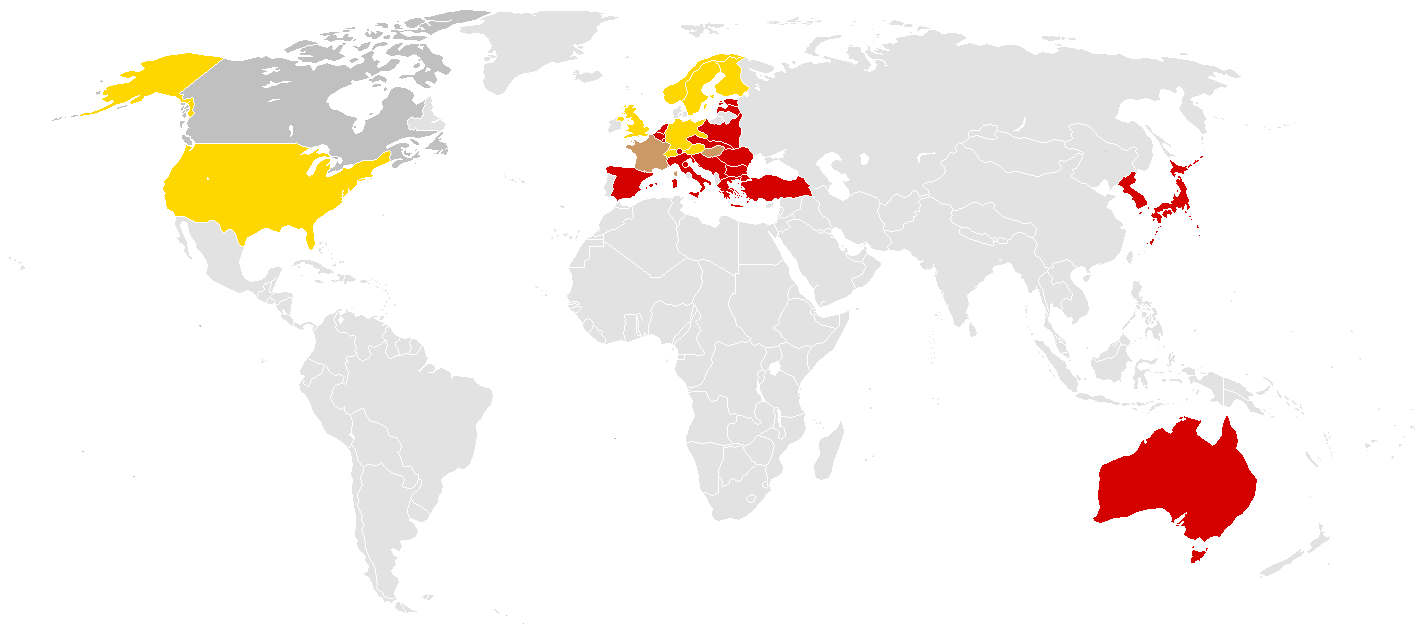
1936 Winter Olympic Games Medals map Legend: Gold represents countries that won at least one gold medal Silver represents countries that won at least one silver medal Bronze represents countries that won at least one bronze medal Red represents countries that did not win any medals Grey represents countries that did not participate

The 1936 Winter Olympics, officially known as the IV Olympic Winter Games, were an international multi-sport event held in Garmisch-Partenkirchen, Germany, from 6 to 16 February 1936. A total of 646 athletes representing 28 National Olympic Committees (NOCs) participated, 11 NOCs more than the last Winter Games in Lake Placid, United States. NOCs as first-time entrants at the Winter Games included Australia, Bulgaria, Greece, Liechtenstein, Spain, and Turkey. The games featured 17 events in 4 sports across 8 disciplines. These games were the last time that the same country hosted the Summer Olympics and Winter Olympics in the same year, with the 1936 Summer Olympics being held from 1 to 16 August 1936 in Berlin. (Note: The 1940 Winter Olympics and 1940 Summer Olympics were both planned to be held in Japan, with Sapporo hosting the Winter Games and Tokyo hosting the Summer Games, but both were cancelled due to World War II.)

Overall, athletes representing 11 NOCs won at least one medal, and 8 NOCs won at least one gold medal. Norway won the most gold medals and the most overall medals, with 7 and 15 respectively. Germany's team obtained their first Winter Olympic gold medal, with alpine skier Christl Cranz winning the women's combined event. (Note: Germany also won two other gold medals during the games, though Cranz's event was held before the other two, therefore making her Germany's first Winter Olympic gold medalist.) Norway and Sweden both achieved podium sweeps at the games, with the former in the individual Nordic combined event with Oddbjørn Hagen winning the gold, Olaf Hoffsbakken winning the silver, and Sverre Brodahl winning the bronze, and the latter in the men's 50 kilometre cross-country skiing event with Elis Wiklund winning the gold, Axel Wikström winning the silver, and Nils-Joel Englund winning the bronze.

Speed skater Ivar Ballangrud of Norway won the most gold medals and overall medals for an individual at the games, with three and four respectively. Ballangrud became the first athlete since middle- and long-distance runner Paavo Nurmi of Finland at the 1924 Summer Olympics in Paris, France, to attain the greatest Olympic performance by an individual.

== Medal table ==
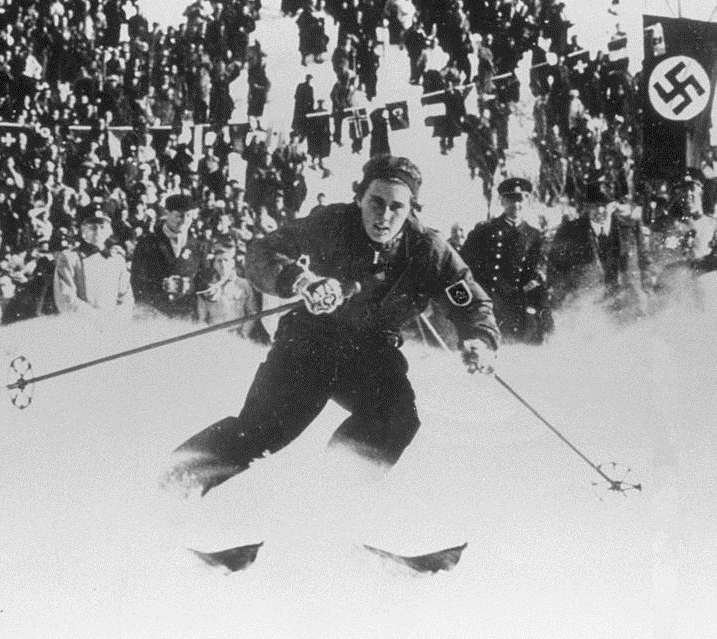
Christl Cranz, the first Winter Olympic gold medalist for Germany

The medal table is based on information provided by the International Olympic Committee (IOC) and is consistent with IOC conventional sorting in its published medal tables. The table uses the Olympic medal table sorting method. By default, the table is ordered by the number of gold medals the athletes from a nation have won, where a nation is an entity represented by a NOC. The number of silver medals is taken into consideration next and then the number of bronze medals. If teams are still tied, equal ranking is given and they are listed alphabetically by their IOC country code.

* Host nation (Germany)

1936 Winter Olympics medal table
Rank	Nation	Gold	Silver	Bronze	Total
1	Norway	7	5	3	15
2	Germany*	3	3	0	6
3	Sweden	2	2	3	7
4	Finland	1	2	3	6
5	Switzerland	1	2	0	3
6	Austria	1	1	2	4
7	Great Britain	1	1	1	3
8	United States	1	0	3	4
9	Canada	0	1	0	1
10	France	0	0	1	1
10	Hungary	0	0	1	1
Totals (11 entries)		17	17	17	51
