= Oddbjørn Hagen =

Norwegian skier (1908–1983)

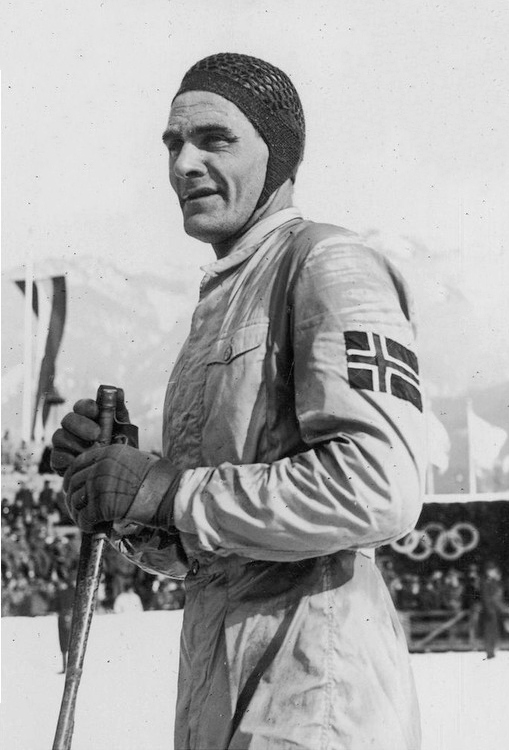
- Hagen at the 1936 Olympics

Personal information
- Born: 3 February 1908 Ytre Rendal, Norway
- Died: 25 June 1983 (aged 75) Skedsmo, Norway

Sport
- Sport: Nordic skiing
- Club: Bækkelagets SK, Oslo
Medal record
Representing Norway
Men's Nordic combined
Olympic Games
| Gold medal – first place | 1936 Garmisch-Partenkirchen | Individual |
World Championships
| Gold medal – first place | 1934 Sollefteå | Individual |
| Gold medal – first place | 1935 Vysoké Tatry | Individual |
Men's cross-country skiing
Olympic Games
| Silver medal – second place | 1936 Garmisch-Partenkirchen | 18 km |
| Silver medal – second place | 1936 Garmisch-Partenkirchen | 4 × 10 km relay |
World Championships
| Silver medal – second place | 1935 Vysoké Tatry | 18 km |
| Silver medal – second place | 1935 Vysoké Tatry | 4 × 10 km relay |

Oddbjørn Hagen (3 February 1908 – 25 June 1983) was a Norwegian skier who competed in Nordic combined and cross-country skiing. He was both Olympic and World champion.

== Olympic Games ==
At the 1936 Winter Olympics, Hagen won one gold in the Nordic combined and two silvers in cross-country skiing. The cross-country relay event saw its first Olympic appearance in 1936. Hagen had the first leg, and finished his leg one minute ahead of Finland's Sulo Nurmela, with Sweden's John Berger fifteen seconds further behind. Kalle Jalkanen on the final leg secured Finland the relay victory, six seconds ahead of the Norwegian team.

The 18 kilometre cross-country skiing race was also the first part of the Nordic combined. Hagen finished second in the 18 km, behind Sweden's Erik August Larsson, earning him a silver medal. After the ski jumping the next day, he secured the gold medal in the combined.

== World Championships ==
At the FIS Nordic World Ski Championships, Hagen won golds in the individual Nordic combined (1934, 1935) and silvers in the men's 4 × 10 km relay and the men's 18 km (both 1935). Hagen's consecutive world championships in Nordic combined would not be repeated until fellow Norwegian Bjarte Engen Vik won the event in 1999 and 2001. In the 4 × 10 km relay in Sollefteå in 1934, Hagen had the final leg, and while battling with Sweden's Arthur Häggblad for the silver medal they both got off course and lost ten minutes. The two were passed by Germany, and Hagen finished fourth behind the Swedish team.

== Holmenkollen ==
At the Holmenkollen ski festival, Hagen won the Nordic combined event three times (1932, 1934, and 1935). For his Nordic combined successes at the Olympics, Holmenkollen, and World Championships, Hagen earned the Holmenkollen medal in 1934.

Hagen hailed from Ytre Rendal Municipality, and competed for Bækkelagets SK in Oslo. He received the King's Cup five times. His strongest discipline was cross-country skiing, while his results in ski jumping were steady, but not outstanding. Most of his life he worked as a workshop manager in Oslo.

== Cross-country skiing results ==
All results are sourced from the International Ski Federation (FIS).

=== Olympic Games ===
- 2 medals – (2 silver)

| Year | Age | 18 km | 50 km | 4 × 10 km relay |
|---|---|---|---|---|
| 1936 | 28 | Silver | — | Silver |

=== World Championships ===
- 2 medals – (2 silver)

| Year | Age | 17 km | 18 km | 50 km | 4 × 10 km relay |
|---|---|---|---|---|---|
| 1930 | 22 | — | —N/a | 25 | —N/a |
| 1934 | 26 | —N/a | 6 | — | 4 |
| 1935 | 27 | —N/a | Silver | — | Silver |
