= Oskar Fredriksen =

Oskar Fredriksen may refer to:

- Oskar Fredriksen (cross-country skier) (1909–1991), Norwegian cross country skier
- Oskar Fredriksen (speed skater) (1870–1920), Norwegian speedskater
