= Liljeberg =

Liljeberg is a surname. Notable people with the surname include:

- Ulrika Liljeberg (born 1969), Swedish politician
- Georg Liljeberg (1905–1993), German politician (SPD)
- Rebecka Liljeberg (born 1981), Swedish actress
- Yngve Liljeberg (1909–1978), Swedish ice hockey player
