= Sigurd Røen =

Norwegian Nordic combined skier

Medal record

Representing Norway

Men's cross-country skiing

World Championships
Gold medal – first place	1937 Chamonix	4 × 10 km relay

Men's Nordic combined

World Championships
Gold medal – first place	1937 Chamonix	Individual

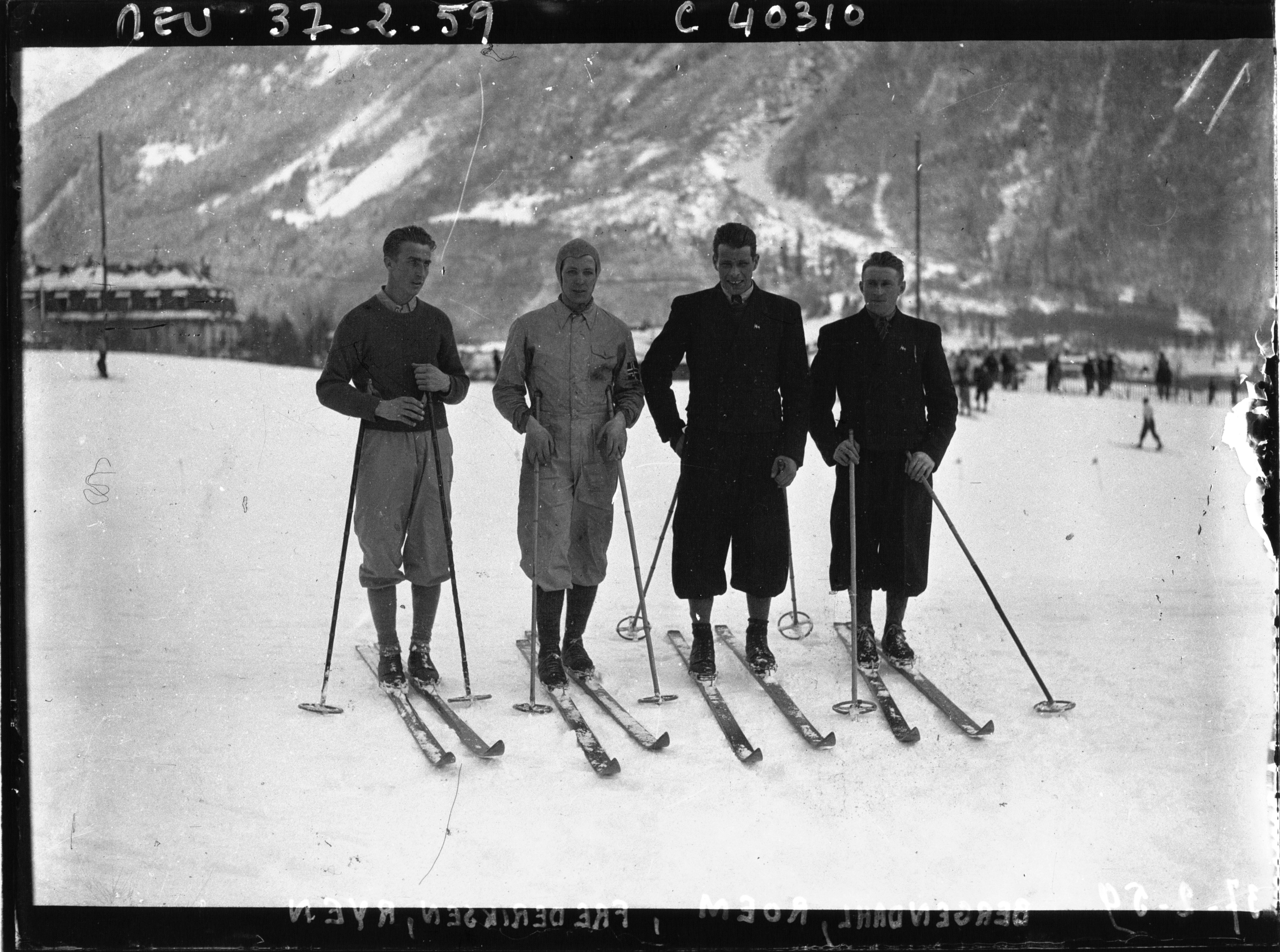
Norwegian relay in 1937 in Chamonix

Sigurd Røen (12 February 1909 in Rindal – 17 September 1992) was a Norwegian Nordic skier who competed in the 1930s.

He won two gold medals at the 1937 FIS Nordic World Ski Championships in the Nordic combined and the 4 × 10 km relay.

== Cross-country skiing results ==
=== World Championships ===
- 1 medal – (1 gold)

Year	Age	18 km	50 km	4 × 10 km relay
1935	26	8	—	—
1937	28	7	—	Gold
