= Bulgaria at the 1936 Winter Olympics =

- IOC code: BUL
- NOC: Bulgarian Olympic Committee
- Website: www.bgolympic.org (in Bulgarian and English)

in Garmisch-Partenkirchen
- Competitors: 7 in 2 sports
- Medals: Gold 0 Silver 0 Bronze 0 Total 0

Winter Olympics appearances (overview)
- 1936; 1948; 1952; 1956; 1960; 1964; 1968; 1972; 1976; 1980; 1984; 1988; 1992; 1994; 1998; 2002; 2006; 2010; 2014; 2018; 2022; 2026

Bulgaria competed at the Winter Olympic Games for the first time at the 1936 Winter Olympics in Garmisch-Partenkirchen, Germany.

== Alpine skiing ==
Men

Athlete	Event	Downhill		Slalom			Total	
Athlete	Event	Time	Rank	Time 1	Time 2	Rank	Total points	Rank
Boyan Dimitrov	Combined	DSQ	–	–	–	–	DNF	–
Asen Tsankov	Combined	10:53.2	53	2:13.5	DSQ	–	DNF	–
Borislav Yordanov	Combined	6:06.4	30	2:06.1	DSQ	–	DNF	–

== Cross-country skiing ==
Men

Event	Athlete	Race	
Event	Athlete	Time	Rank
18 km	Racho Zhekov	1'43:11	70
18 km	Dimitar Kostov	1'42:22	68
18 km	Ivan Angelakov	1'41:44	66
18 km	Hristo Kochov	1'32:30	53

Men's 4 x 10 km relay

Athletes	Race	
Athletes	Time	Rank
Hristo Kochov; Ivan Angelakov; Dimitar Kostov; Racho Zhekov	3'29:39	15
