= Lauri Valonen =

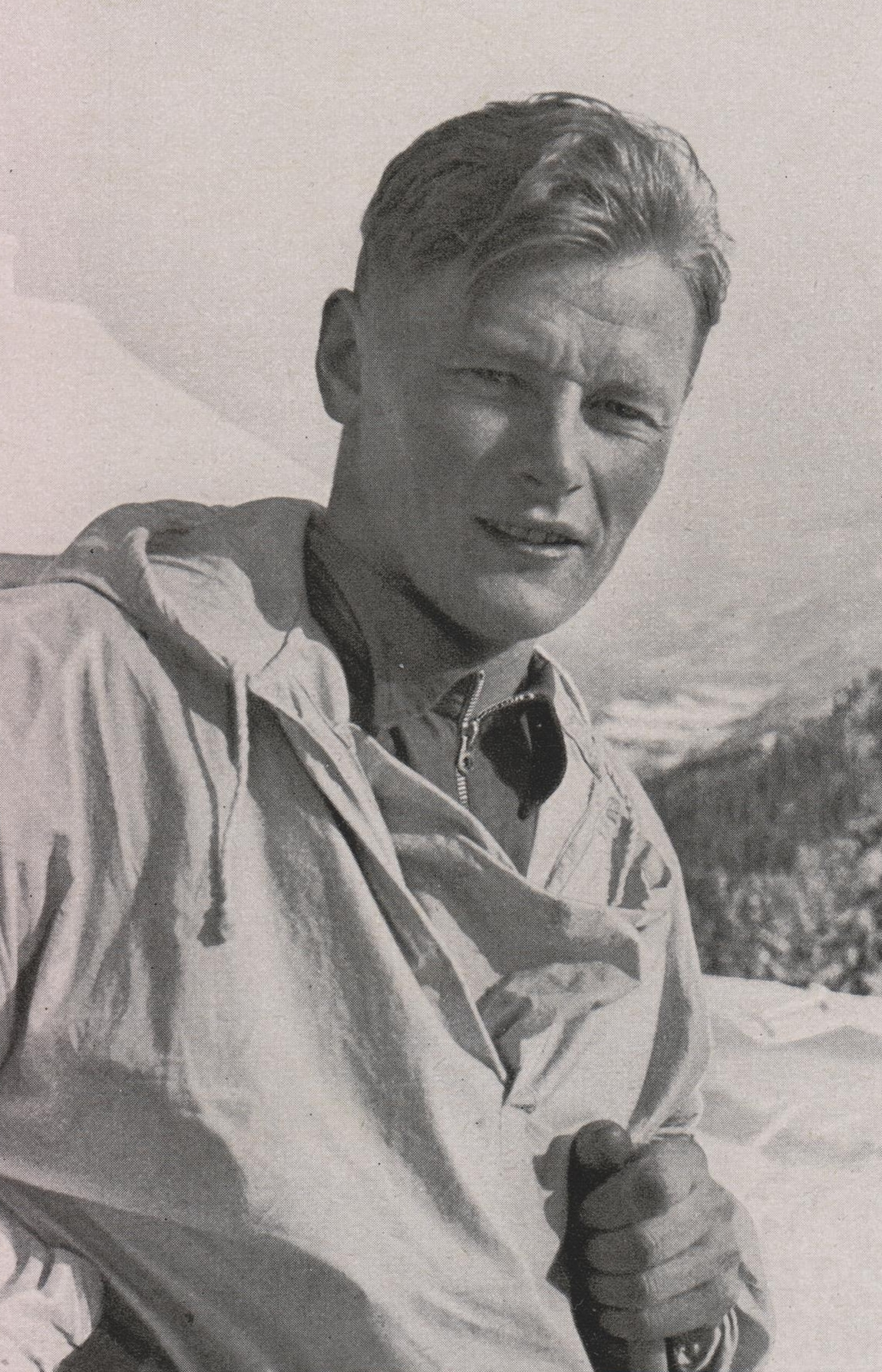

Medal record

Men's Nordic combined

World Championships
Silver medal – second place	1935 Vysoké Tatry	Individual

Lauri Valonen (28 November 1909 – 2 October 1982) was a Finnish Nordic combined skier who competed in the 1930s. He won a silver medal in the individual event at the 1935 FIS Nordic World Ski Championships in Vysoké Tatry.

Valonen also finished 4th in the individual event at the 1936 Winter Olympics in Garmisch-Partenkirchen.
