= Rolf Kaarby =

Norwegian Nordic combined skier

Medal record

Men's Nordic combined

World Championships
Silver medal – second place	1937 Chamonix	Individual

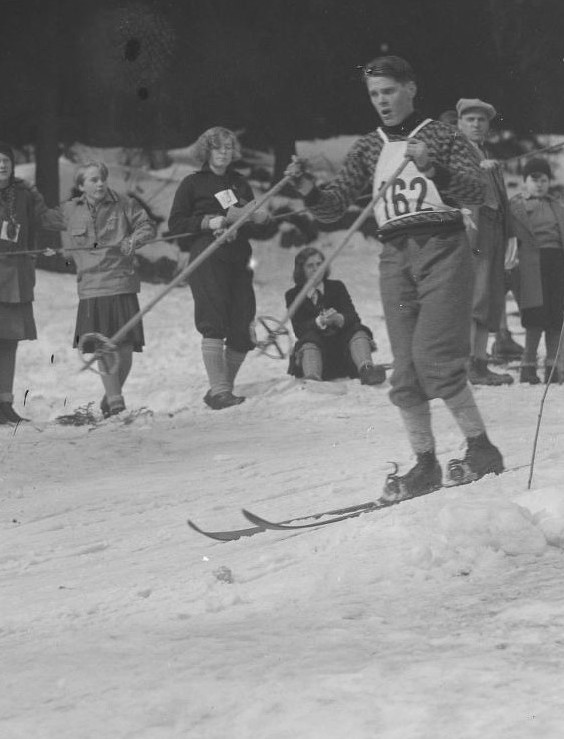

Rolf Kaarby (6 October 1909 – 7 March 1976) was a Norwegian Nordic combined skier who competed in the 1930s. He won a silver medal in the individual event at the 1937 FIS Nordic World Ski Championships in Chamonix.
