= Sigurd Solid =

Norwegian ski jumper

Medal record

Men's ski jumping

Representing Norway

World Championships
Bronze medal – third place	1937 Chamonix	Individual normal hill

Sigurd Solid (7 May 1913 – 1988) was a Norwegian ski jumper who competed in the 1930s. He won a ski jumping bronze at the 1937 FIS Nordic World Ski Championships in Chamonix.
