= Vincenzo Demetz =

Italian skier

Medal record

Men's cross-country skiing

World Championships
Bronze medal – third place	1937 Chamonix	50 km
Bronze medal – third place	1937 Chamonix	4 x 10 km

Vincenzo Demetz (10 September 1911 – 24 November 1990), named also Zenz de Tita d'Odl, was an Italian cross-country skier who competed in the 1930s.

At the 1936 Winter Olympics he was a member of the Italian relay team which finished fourth in the 4x10 km relay competition. In the 18 km event he finished 13th and in the 50 km competition he finished 19th. He won two bronze medals in the 1937 FIS Nordic World Ski Championships in the 50 km and the 4 x 10 km.

Further notable results were:

- 1935: 1st, Italian men's championships of cross-country skiing, 18 km
- 1936:
  - 2nd, Italian men's championships of cross-country skiing, 18 km
  - 3rd, Italian men's championships of cross-country skiing, 36 km
- 1938:
  - 2nd, Italian men's championships of cross-country skiing, 50 km
  - 3rd, Italian men's championships of cross-country skiing, 18 km
- 1951: 2nd, Italian men's championships of cross-country skiing, 50 km

Demetz was born and died in Santa Cristina Gherdëina. He was the grandfather of Michela Ponza.
