= Roberts Lapainis =

Latvian ice hockey player

- Born: October 17, 1913 Sece Parish, Russian Empire
- Died: September 30, 1947 (aged 33) Riga, Latvian SSR, Soviet Union
- Position: Goaltender
- Played for: US Riga (Latvian); Dinamo Riga (Soviet)
- National team: Latvia
- Playing career: 1933–1947

Roberts Lapainis (October 17, 1913 – September 30, 1947) was a Latvian ice hockey goaltender. He played with the Latvia men's national ice hockey team at the 1936 Winter Olympics held in Garmisch-Partenkirchen, Germany.
