= FIS Nordic World Ski Championships 1937 =

International Nordic skiing competition

- Host city: Chamonix
- Country: France
- Events: 5
- Opening: 12 February 1937
- Closing: 28 February 1937

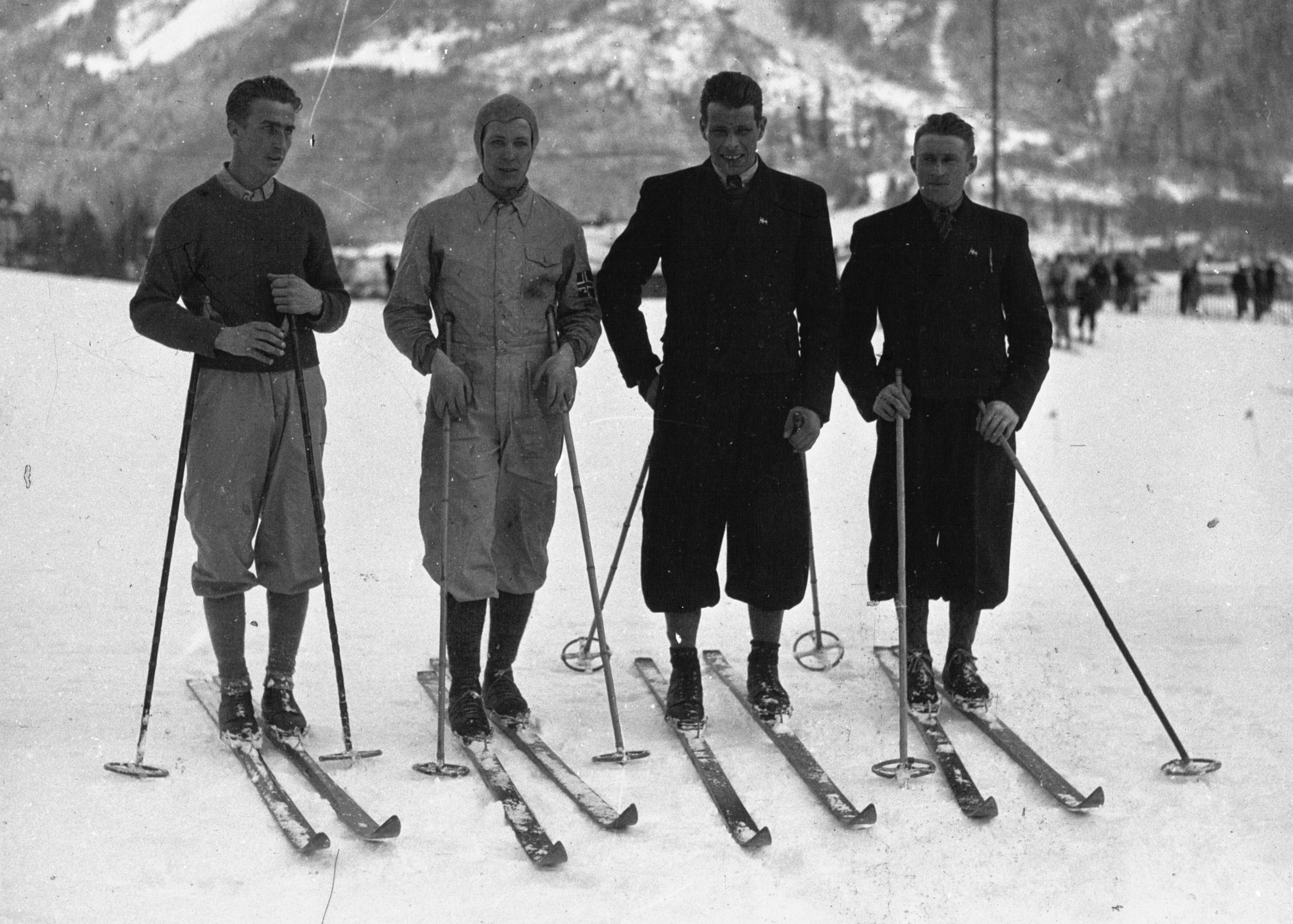
The Norwegian team, winner of the ski relay race from left to right: A. Ryen, Fredericksen, Røen, Bergendahl: [press photography] / Agence Meurisse. Chamonix, 1937

The FIS Nordic World Ski Championships 1937 took place on February 12–18, 1937, in Chamonix, France. The French city hosted the 1924 Winter Olympics which is considered by the FIS as the first FIS Nordic World Ski Championships.

== Men's cross country ==
=== 18 km ===
February 14, 1937

Medal	Athlete	Time
Gold	Lars Bergendahl (NOR)	1:11:24
Silver	Kalle Jalkanen (FIN)	1:12:35
Bronze	Pekka Niemi (FIN)	1:13:48

=== 50 km ===
February 16, 1937

Medal	Athlete	Time
Gold	Pekka Niemi (FIN)	3:36:58
Silver	Klaes Karppinen (FIN)	3:43:59
Bronze	Vincenzo Demetz (ITA)	3:46:39

=== 4 × 10 km relay ===
February 18, 1937

Medal	Team	Time
Gold	Norway (Annar Ryen, Oskar Fredriksen, Sigurd Røen, Lars Bergendahl)	3:06:07
Silver	Finland (Pekka Niemi, Klaes Karppinen, Jussi Kurikkala, Kalle Jalkanen)	3:07:04
Bronze	Italy (Giulio Gerardi, Aristide Compagnoni, Silvio Confortola, Vincenzo Demetz)	3:08:48

== Men's Nordic combined ==
=== Individual ===
February 12, 1937

Medal	Athlete	Points
Gold	Sigurd Røen (NOR)	441.10
Silver	Rolf Kaarby (NOR)	429.20
Bronze	Aarne Valkama (FIN)	412.10

== Men's ski jumping ==
=== Individual large hill ===
February 12, 1937

Medal	Athlete	Points
Gold	Birger Ruud (NOR)	233.8
Silver	Reidar Andersen (NOR)	231.4
Bronze	Sigurd Solid (NOR)	225.7

== Medal table ==
Rank	Nation	Gold	Silver	Bronze	Total
1	Norway (NOR)	4	2	1	7
2	Finland (FIN)	1	3	2	6
3	Italy (ITA)	0	0	2	2
Totals (3 entries)		5	5	5	15
