= Mikko Husu =

Finnish cross-country skier

Medal record

Men's cross-country skiing

Representing Finland

World Championships
Gold medal – first place	1935 Vysoké Tatry	4 × 10 km relay

Mikko Husu (30 September 1905 – 13 June 1977) was a Finnish cross-country skier who competed in the 1930s. He won a gold medal in the 4 × 10 km relay at the 1935 FIS Nordic World Ski Championships in Vysoké Tatry.

Husu would also finish fourth in the 50 km event at those same championships.

== Cross-country skiing results ==
All results are sourced from the International Ski Federation (FIS).

=== World Championships ===
- 1 medal – (1 gold)

Year	Age	18 km	50 km	4 × 10 km relay
1935	29	—	4	Gold
1938	32	58	—	—
