= Pekka Niemi (skier) =

Finnish cross-country skier

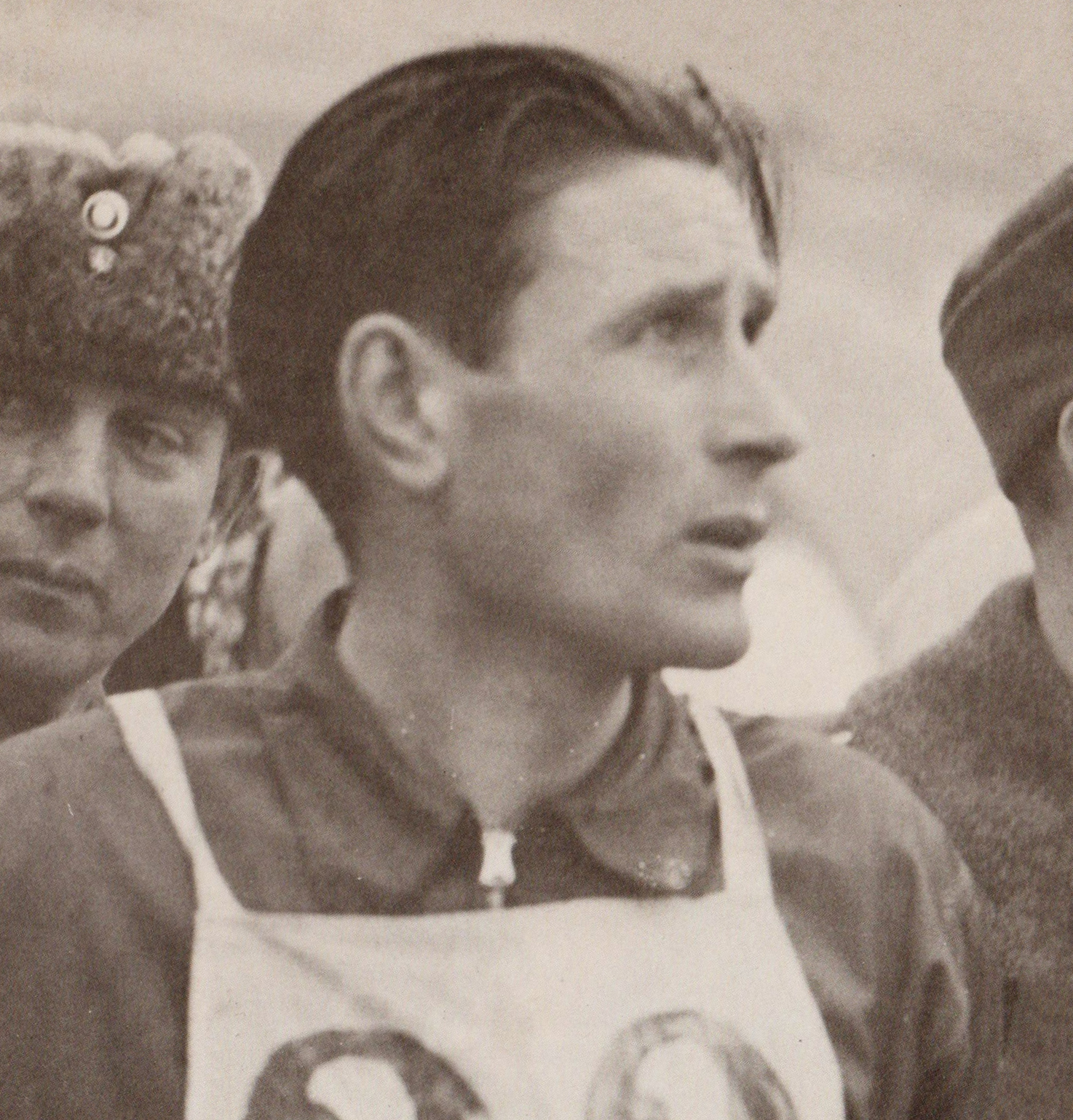

Personal information
- Born: 14 November 1909 Alapaakkola, Keminmaa, Finland
- Died: 21 December 1993 (aged 84) Kittilä, Finland
- Height: 170 cm (5 ft 7 in)
- Weight: 66 kg (146 lb)

Sport
- Sport: Cross-country skiing
- Club: Kittilän Urheilijat
Medal record
Men's cross-country skiing
Representing Finland
Olympic Games
Bronze medal – third place	1936 Garmisch-Partenkirchen	18 km
World Championships
Gold medal – first place	1937 Chamonix	50 km
Silver medal – second place	1937 Chamonix	4 × 10 km relay
Bronze medal – third place	1937 Chamonix	18 km

Juho Pekka Niemi (born Yliniemi, 14 November 1909 – 21 December 1993) was a Finnish cross-country skier who competed at the 1936 Winter Olympics. He won a bronze medal in the 18 km event and placed eighth over 50 km. His biggest success came at the 1937 FIS Nordic World Ski Championships, where he won a complete set of medals: a gold in the 50 km, a silver in the 4 × 10 km relay and a bronze in the 18 km. He also won the 50 km race at the 1938 Holmenkollen ski festival.

Niemi won only one medal at the national championships, a silver in the 50 km in 1935. He retired soon after the 1939 World Championships, where he placed fifth over 50 km and sixth over 18 km. He was a forest manager by profession.

== Cross-country skiing results ==
All results are sourced from the International Ski Federation (FIS).

=== Olympic Games ===
- 1 medal – (1 bronze)

Year	Age	18 km	50 km	4 × 10 km relay
1936	26	Bronze	8	—

=== World Championships ===
- 3 medals – (1 gold, 1 silver, 1 bronze)

Year	Age	18 km	50 km	4 × 10 km relay
1937	27	Bronze	Gold	Silver
1938	28	10	4	—
1939	29	6	5	—
