= Kalle Jalkanen =

Finnish cross-country skier

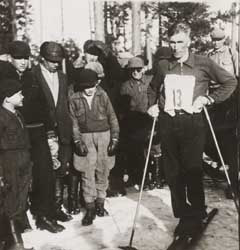
- Kalle Jalkanen in 1936 where he won his gold medal in the 4 x 10km

Personal information
- Born: 10 May 1907 Suonenjoki
- Died: 5 September 1941 (aged 34) Kirjasalo
Medal record
Men's cross-country skiing
Representing Finland
Olympic Games
Gold medal – first place	1936 Garmisch-Partenkirchen	4 × 10 km relay
World Championships
Gold medal – first place	1938 Lahti	50 km
Silver medal – second place	1937 Chamonix	18 km
Silver medal – second place	1937 Chamonix	4 × 10 km relay
Bronze medal – third place	1938 Lahti	18 km

Kalle Jalkanen (10 May 1907 in Suonenjoki – 5 September 1941 in Kirjasalo) was a Finnish cross-country skier who competed in the late 1930s. He won a gold medal at the 1936 Winter Olympics in Garmisch-Partenkirchen in the 4 × 10 km relay. He won the relay along with Sulo Nurmela, Klaes Karppinen and Matti Lähde.

Jalkanen's biggest successes were at the Nordic skiing World Championships where he earned four medals, including one gold (50 km: 1938), two silvers (18 km and 4 × 10 km relay: both 1937), and one bronze (18 km: 1938)

He was killed during World War II.

== Cross-country skiing results ==
All results are sourced from the International Ski Federation (FIS).

=== Olympic Games ===
- 1 medal – (1 gold)

Year	Age	18 km	50 km	4 × 10 km relay
1936	28	12	—	Gold

=== World Championships ===
- 4 medals – (1 gold, 2 silver, 1 bronze)

Year	Age	18 km	50 km	4 × 10 km relay
1937	29	Silver	4	Silver
1938	30	Bronze	Gold	—
1939	31	4	—	—
