= Halvar Moritz =

Swedish cross-country skier

Medal record

Men's cross-country skiing

Representing Sweden

World Championships
Bronze medal – third place	1935 Vysoké Tatry	4 × 10 km relay

Halvar Moritz (June 21, 1906 – November 21, 1993) was a Swedish cross-country skier who competed in the 1930s. He won a bronze medal in the 4 × 10 km relay at the 1935 FIS Nordic World Ski Championships.

== Cross-country skiing results ==
=== World Championships ===
- 1 medal – (1 bronze)

Year	Age	18 km	50 km	4 × 10 km relay
1935	28	—	—	Bronze
