= Aarne Valkama =

Finnish Nordic combined skier

Medal record

Men's Nordic combined

World Championships
Bronze medal – third place	1937 Chamonix	Individual

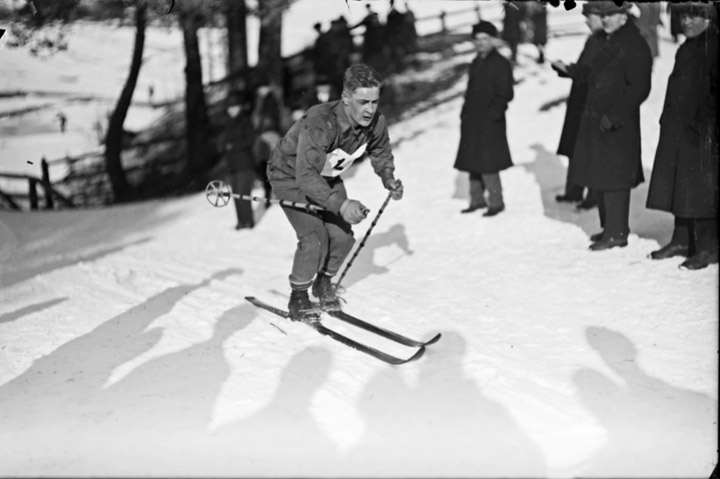
Aarne Valkama in 1937

Aarne Valkama (1909 – 12 November 1969) was a Finnish Nordic combined skier who competed in the 1930s. He won a bronze medal in the individual event at the 1937 FIS Nordic World Ski Championships in Chamonix.
