= Edgars Gruzītis =

Latvian cross-country skier (1912–1950)

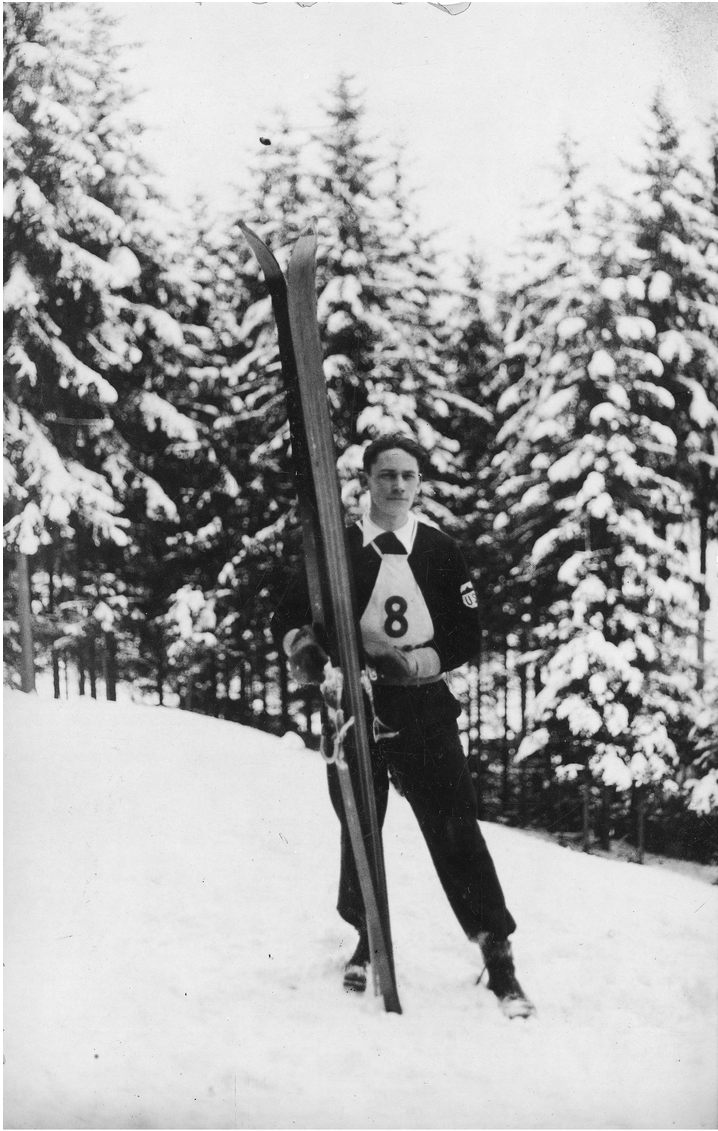
- Gruzītis in 1934

Personal information
- Nationality: Latvian
- Born: 14 March 1912; Dzirciems, Riga, Latvia
- Died: 19 May 1950 (aged 38); Tukums, Latvia

Sport
- Sport: Cross-country skiing

Edgars Gruzītis (14 March 1912 – 19 May 1950) was a Latvian cross-country skier who placed 13th in the men's relay event at the 1936 Winter Olympics.
