= Michał Górski =

Polish cross-country skier

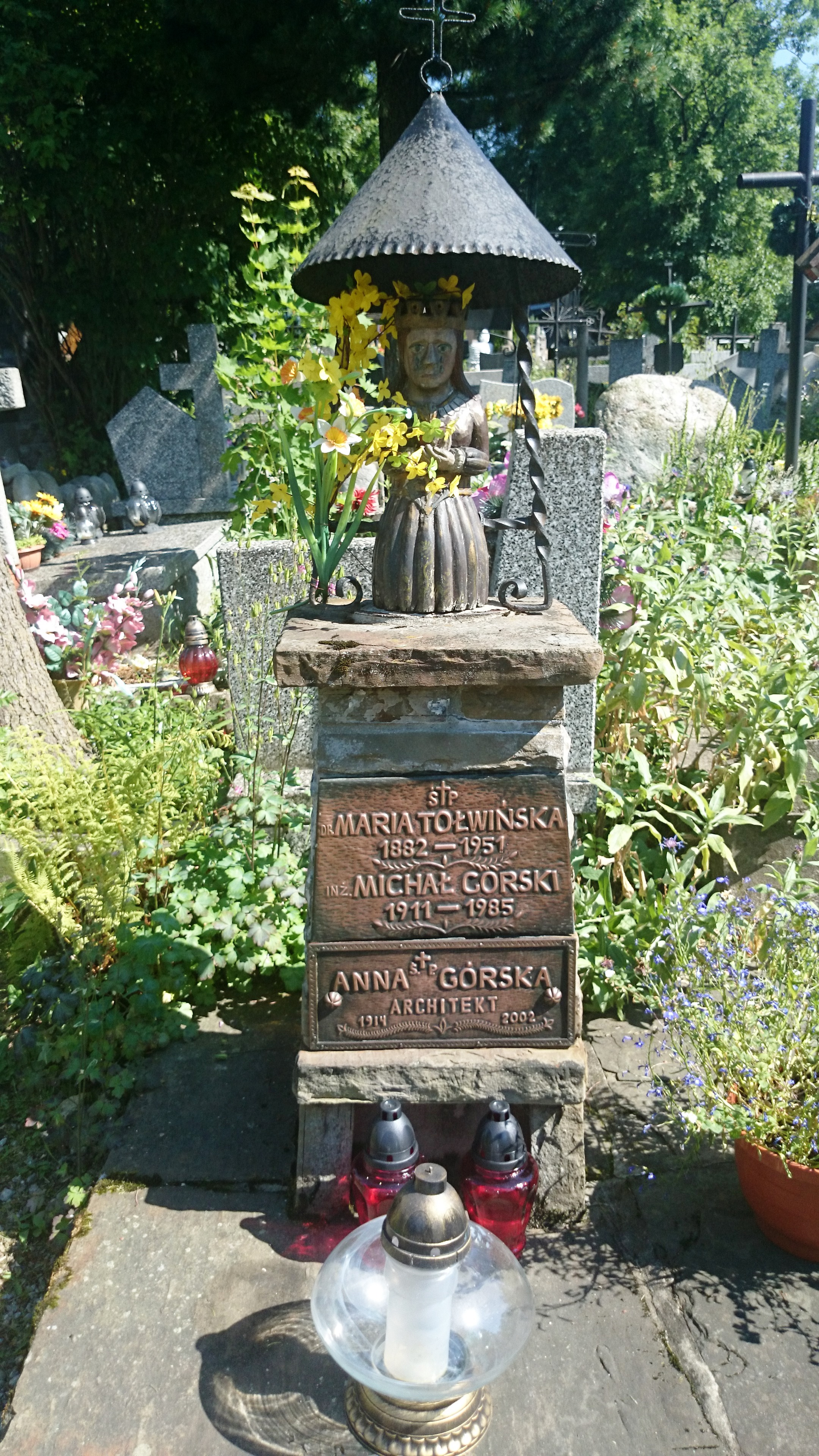
Grave of Górski and his family at the New Cemetery in Zakopane

Michał Jan Górski (15 September 1911 – 19 March 1985) was a Polish cross-country skier who competed in the 1936 Winter Olympics. His civil profession was an engineer and architect.

He was born and died in Zakopane.

In 1936 he was a member of the Polish cross-country relay team which finished seventh in the 4x10 km relay event. In the 18 km competition he finished 22nd.

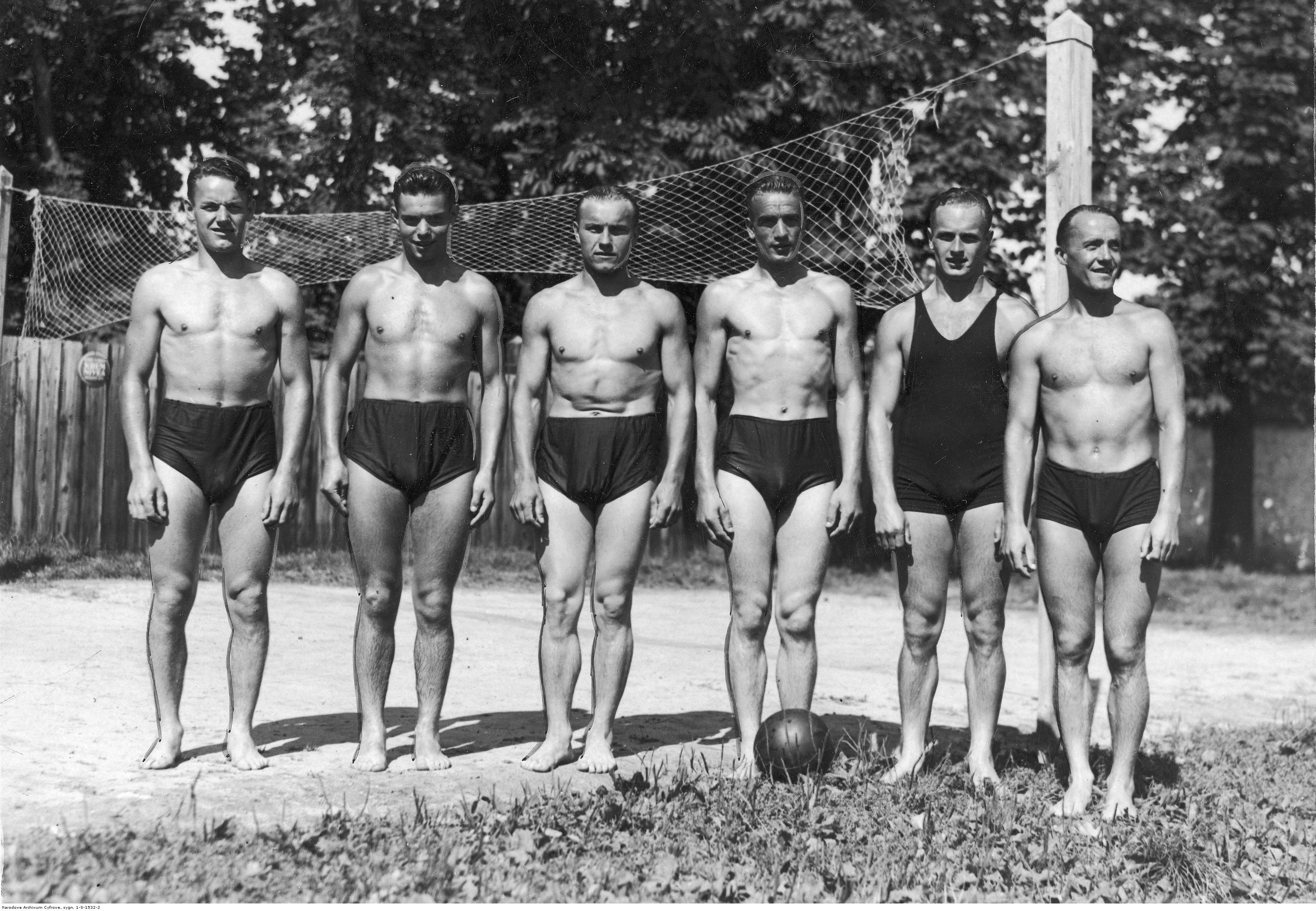
The 1936 Polish Winter Olympic Team. Standing from the right: Bronisław Czech, Marian Orlewicz, Michał Górski, Stanisław Karpiel, Jan Bochenek, and Andrzej Marusarz
