= Oskar Fredriksen (cross-country skier) =

Norwegian cross-country skier

Medal record

Men's cross-country skiing

Representing Norway

World Championships
Gold medal – first place	1937 Chamonix	4 × 10 km relay

Oskar Fredriksen (9 February 1909 – 19 June 1991) was a Norwegian cross-country skier who competed in the 1930s. He won a gold medal in the 4 × 10 km relay at the 1937 FIS Nordic World Ski Championships.

== Cross-country skiing results ==
=== World Championships ===
- 1 medal – (1 gold)

Year	Age	18 km	50 km	4 × 10 km relay
1934	25	49	—	—
1937	28	21	12	Gold
1938	29	40	43	—
