= Hristo Kochov =

Bulgarian cross-country skier

Hristo Kochov (Bulgarian: Христо Кочов, born 7 December 1912, date of death unknown) was a Bulgarian cross-country skier who competed in the 1936 Winter Olympics.

In 1936 he was member of the Bulgarian relay team which finished 15th in the 4x10 km relay competition. In the 18 km event he finished 53rd.
