= Stanisław Karpiel =

Polish cross-country skier

Stanisław Karpiel (May 8, 1909 – November 12, 1992) was a Polish cross-country skier who competed in the 1936 Winter Olympics. He was born in Kościelisko and died in Zakopane.

In 1936 he was a member of the Polish cross-country relay team which finished seventh in the 4x10 km relay event. In the 50 km competition he finished 26th and in the 18 km event he finished 42nd.

During World War II he was a member of the Armia Krajowa and had an alias Bicz (whip). He was later awarded the Cross of Valor military decoration.
