= Bjarne Iversen =

Norwegian cross-country skier (1912–1999)

Medal record

Men's cross-country skiing

Representing Norway

Olympic Games
Silver medal – second place	1936 Garmisch-Partenkirchen	4 × 10 km relay

World Championships
Silver medal – second place	1935 Vysoké Tatry	4 × 10 km relay

Bjarne Iversen (2 October 1912 – 7 September 1999) was a Norwegian cross-country skier who competed in the 1930s. He won a silver medal in the 4 × 10 km relay at the 1936 Winter Olympics in Garmisch-Partenkirchen.

Iversen also won a silver medal in the 4 × 10 km relay at the 1935 FIS Nordic World Ski Championship and had his best individual finish of sixth in the 18 km event at those same games.

== Cross-country skiing results ==
All results are sourced from the International Ski Federation (FIS).

=== Olympic Games ===
- 1 medal – (1 silver)

Year	Age	18 km	50 km	4 × 10 km relay
1936	23	9	—	Silver

=== World Championships ===
- 1 medal – (1 silver)

Year	Age	18 km	50 km	4 × 10 km relay
1935	22	16	—	Silver
