= Marian Woyna Orlewicz =

Polish cross-country skier (1913–2011)

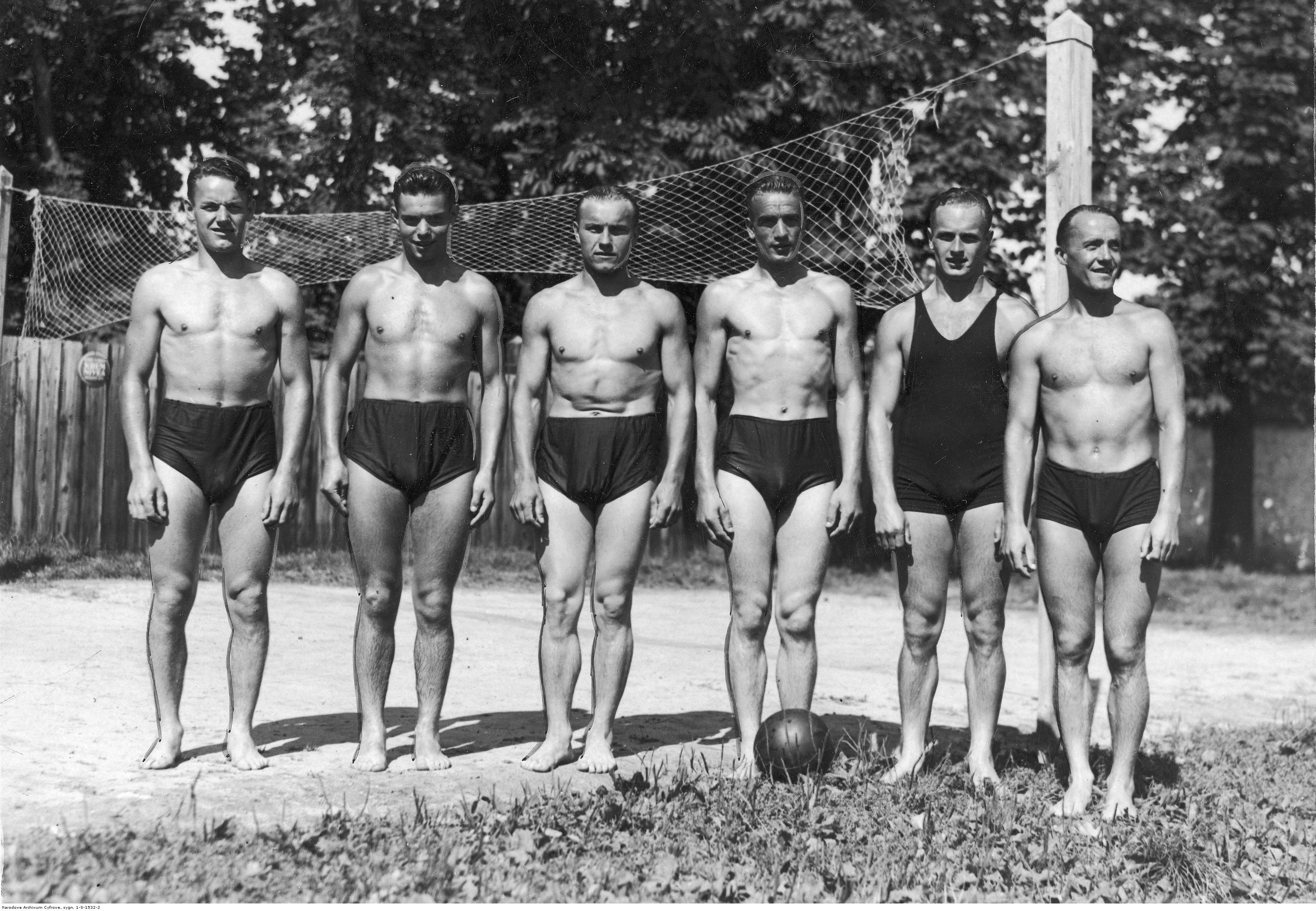
The 1936 Polish Winter Olympic Team. Standing from the right: Bronisław Czech, Marian Orlewicz, Michał Górski, Stanisław Karpiel, Jan Bochenek, and Andrzej Marusarz

Marian Wiktor Woyna-Orlewicz (5 October 1913 – 13 January 2011) was a Polish cross-country skier who competed in the 1936 Winter Olympics. He was born in Wadowice and died in Zakopane.

In 1936 he was a member of the Polish cross-country relay team which finished seventh in the 4x10 km relay event. In the 18 km competition at the same Olympiad he finished 32nd. Before his death, he was the oldest living Polish Olympic competitor.
