= Olaf Hoffsbakken =

Norwegian Nordic skier (1908–1986)

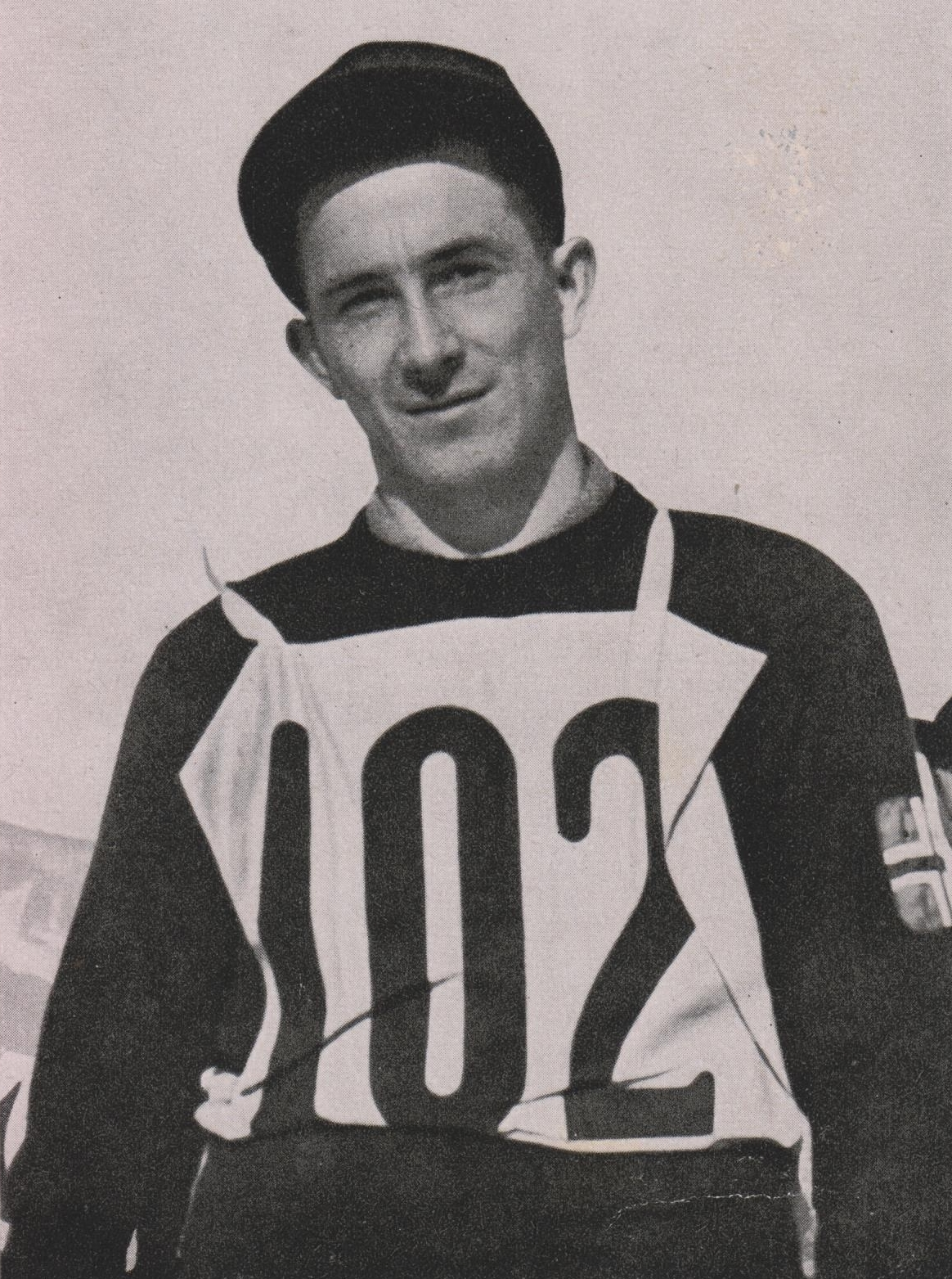
- Olaf Hoffsbakken (1936)

Medal record

Representing Norway

Men's Nordic combined

Olympic Games
Silver medal – second place	1936 Garmisch-Partenkirchen	Individual

World Championships
Gold medal – first place	1938 Lahti	Individual
Gold medal – first place	1938 Lahti	Individual

Men's cross-country skiing

Olympic Games
Silver medal – second place	1936 Garmisch-Partenkirchen	4 × 10 km relay

World Championships
Silver medal – second place	1935 Vysoké Tatry	4 × 10 km relay
Bronze medal – third place	1935 Vysoké Tatry	18 km

Olaf Hoffsbakken (2 September 1908 – 23 November 1986) was a Norwegian Nordic skier who competed in the 1930s. He won two silver medals at the 1936 Winter Olympics in Garmisch-Partenkirchen in both the Nordic combined and the 4 × 10 km relay.

In addition, he won a complete set of medals at the FIS Nordic World Ski Championships. This included a gold in the Nordic combined (1938), a silver in the 4 × 10 km relay (1935), and a bronze in the 18 km (1935).

Hoffsbakken won the Holmenkollen ski festival's Nordic combined event twice (1936 and 1939). In 1937, he shared the Holmenkollen medal with fellow Norwegians Birger Ruud and Martin P. Vangsli.

== Cross-country skiing results ==
All results are sourced from the International Ski Federation (FIS).

=== Olympic Games ===
- 1 medal – (1 silver)

Year	Age	18 km	50 km	4 × 10 km relay
1936	27	5	—	Silver

=== World Championships ===
- 2 medals – (1 silver, 1 bronze)

Year	Age	18 km	50 km	4 × 10 km relay
1934	25	40	—	4
1935	26	Bronze	—	Silver
1938	29	8	41	—
1939	30	16	16	4
