= Avgust Jakopič =

Slovenian cross-country skier

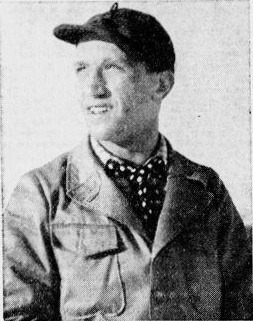
- Avgust Jakopič in 1936

Personal information
- Nationality: Slovenian
- Born: 11 July 1913; Bled, Austria-Hungary
- Died: 2000 (aged 86–87)

Sport
- Sport: Cross-country skiing

Avgust Jakopič (11 July 1913 – 2000) was a Slovenian cross-country skier. He competed in the men's 18 kilometre event at the 1936 Winter Olympics.
