= Axel Wikström =

Swedish cross-country skier

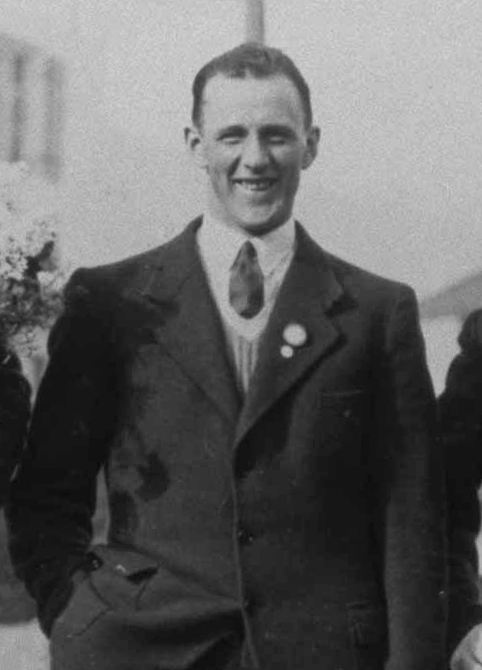
- Wikström at the 1936 Winter Olympics

Personal information
- Born: 29 September 1907 Skellefteå, Sweden
- Died: 16 June 1976 (aged 68) Skellefteå, Sweden

Sport
- Sport: Cross-country skiing
- Club: Skellefteå AIK
Medal record
Men's cross-country skiing
Representing Sweden
Olympic Games
Silver medal – second place	1932 Lake Placid	18 km
Silver medal – second place	1936 Garmisch-Partenkirchen	50 km

Axel Theodor Wikström (29 September 1907 – 16 June 1976) was a Swedish cross-country skier who won two Olympic silver medals: one in the 18 km in 1932 and the other in the 50 km event in 1936.

Wikström never won an individual Swedish title, but he did win the 30 km team competition in 1936, and earlier in March 1935 became the first foreigner to win the 50 km race at the Lahti Ski Games. He was also known for preparing ski tracks for the local competitions, such as the 1946 Swedish Championships.

== Cross-country skiing results ==
All results are sourced from the International Ski Federation (FIS).

=== Olympic Games ===
- 2 medals – (2 silver)

Year	Age	18 km	50 km	4 × 10 km relay
1932	28	Silver	—	—N/a
1936	32	—	Silver	—
