= Alojz Klančnik =

Slovenian cross-country skier (1912–1972)

Personal information
- Nationality: Slovenian
- Born: 23 October 1912; Mojstrana, Austria-Hungary
- Died: 17 January 1972 (aged 59); Mojstrana, SR Slovenia, Yugoslavia

Sport
- Sport: Cross-country skiing

Alojz Klančnik (23 October 1912 – 17 January 1972) was a Slovenian cross-country skier.He competed at the 1936 Winter Olympics and the 1948 Winter Olympics.
