= Yngve Liljeberg =

Swedish ice hockey player (1909–1978)

- Born: 23 July 1909 Stockholm, Sweden
- Died: 5 October 1978 (aged 69) Stockholm, Sweden
- National team: Sweden

Karl Yngve Liljeberg (23 July 1909 – 5 October 1978) was a Swedish ice hockey player. He competed in the men's tournament at the 1936 Winter Olympics. Liljeberg played for Nacka SK and IK Göta.

Liljeberg played football for Djurgårdens IF Fotboll in the 1935–36 season and for Djurgårdens IF Bandy in 1940 and 1941 seasons.
