= Martin Matsbo =

Swedish cross-country skier

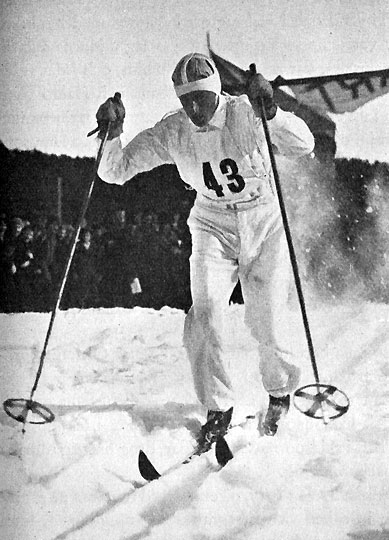
- Martin Matsbo by the mid 1930's

Personal information
- Born: 4 October 1911 Hedemora, Sweden
- Died: 6 September 2002 (aged 90) Södertälje, Sweden

Sport
- Sport: Cross-country skiing
- Club: IFK Hedemora (1922–1936); Malungs IF
Medal record
Representing Sweden
Men's cross-country skiing
Olympic Games
Bronze medal – third place	1936 Garmisch Partenkircen	4 × 10 km relay
World Championships
Bronze medal – third place	1935 Vysoké Tatry	4 × 10 km relay
Bronze medal – third place	1938 Lahti	4 × 10 km relay

Martin Matsbo (4 October 1911 – 6 September 2002) was a Swedish cross-country skier who won a bronze medal in the 4 × 10 km relay at the 1936 Winter Olympics in Garmisch-Partenkirchen. He finished fourth in the 18 km event at those Games.

Matsbo has earned two 4 × 10 km relay bronze medals at the FIS Nordic World Ski Championships (1935, 1938). His best individual finish at the Nordic skiing World Championships was fourth in the 18 km in 1938. Matsbo also won the 18 km event at the 1937 Holmenkollen ski festival.

He was born Martin Gustafsson, but changed his surname to Matsbo in 1928 after the village where he lived. He was a non-commissioned military officer, and in 1941 participated in the War World Championships in Cortina d'Ampezzo. For more than three decades Matsbo was working on new ski wax formulations. He developed a ski wax that was one of the most used in the 1940s and 1950s. In 1942 his wax boiler in Malung burned down, destroying many of his recipes and ongoing experiments, and to continue his work he joined the Astra company. Here, he developed Swix, one of the first synthetic waxes, which became commercial in 1946, and was used at the 1948 Olympics. Matsbo later produced other wax types for ski jumping and alpine skiing. He was featured in the 1988 documentary film De sista skidåkarna (The Last Skiers). On his 90th birthday in 2001, he received the Peder Smith Medal, the highest award of his hometown Hedemora. The Matsboloppet, a national cross-country race in Hedemora, is named after him.

== Cross-country skiing results ==
All results are sourced from the International Ski Federation (FIS).

=== Olympic Games ===
- 1 medal – (1 bronze)

Year	Age	18 km	50 km	4 × 10 km relay
1936	24	4	—	Bronze

=== World Championships ===
- 2 medals – (2 bronze)

Year	Age	18 km	50 km	4 × 10 km relay
1935	25	5	6	Bronze
1938	28	4	—	Bronze
