= Sverre Brodahl =

Norwegian Nordic skier (1909–1998)

Medal record

Men's Nordic skiing

Representing Norway

Olympic Games
Silver medal – second place	1936 Garmisch-Partenkirchen	4 × 10 km relay
Bronze medal – third place	1936 Garmisch-Partenkirchen	Nordic combined

Sverre Brodahl (26 January 1909 – 2 November 1998) was a Norwegian Nordic skier who competed in the 1930s. He won two medals at the 1936 Winter Olympics in Garmisch-Partenkirchen with a silver in the 4 × 10 km, and a bronze in the Nordic combined.

In addition, he won the Holmenkollen ski festival's Nordic combined event in 1937.

== Cross-country skiing results ==
All results are sourced from the International Ski Federation (FIS).

=== Olympic Games ===
- 1 medal – (1 silver)

Year	Age	18 km	50 km	4 × 10 km relay
1936	27	—	—	Silver

=== World Championships ===
Year	Age	17 km	50 km
1930	21	—	39
