= FIS Nordic World Ski Championships 1935 =

International Nordic skiing competition

- Host city: Vysoké Tatry
- Country: Czechoslovakia
- Events: 5
- Opening: 13 February 1935
- Closing: 18 February 1935

The FIS Nordic World Ski Championships 1935 took place February 13–18, 1935 in Vysoké Tatry, Czechoslovakia.

== Men's cross country ==
=== 18 km ===
February 15, 1935

Medal	Athlete	Time
Gold	Klaes Karppinen (FIN)	1:27:58
Silver	Oddbjørn Hagen (NOR)	1:28:45
Bronze	Olaf Hoffsbakken (NOR)	1:31:47

=== 50 km ===
February 17, 1935

Medal	Athlete	Time
Gold	Nils-Joel Englund (SWE)	4:14:23
Silver	Klaes Karppinen (FIN)	4:26:42
Bronze	Trygve Brodahl (NOR)	4:32:31

=== 4 × 10 km relay ===
February 18, 1935

Medal	Team	Time
Gold	Finland (Mikko Husu, Klaes Karppinen, Väinö Liikkanen, Sulo Nurmela)	2:42:30
Silver	Norway (Trygve Brodahl, Bjarne Iversen, Olaf Hoffsbakken, Oddbjørn Hagen)	2:43:17
Bronze	Sweden (Halvar Moritz, Erik August Larsson, Martin Matsbo, Nils-Joel Englund)	2:46:53

== Men's Nordic combined ==
=== Individual ===
February 13, 1935

Medal	Athlete	Points
Gold	Oddbjørn Hagen (NOR)	427.60
Silver	Lauri Valonen (FIN)	422.75
Bronze	Willy Bogner (GER)	393.00

== Men's ski jumping ==
=== Individual large hill ===
February 13, 1935

Medal	Athlete	Points
Gold	Birger Ruud (NOR)	231.7
Silver	Reidar Andersen (NOR)	228.9
Bronze	Alf Andersen (NOR)	225.9

== Medal table ==
Rank	Nation	Gold	Silver	Bronze	Total
1	Norway (NOR)	2	3	3	8
2	Finland (FIN)	2	2	0	4
3	Sweden (SWE)	1	0	1	2
4	Germany (GER)	0	0	1	1
Totals (4 entries)		5	5	5	15
