= Leon Knap =

Slovenian cross-country skier

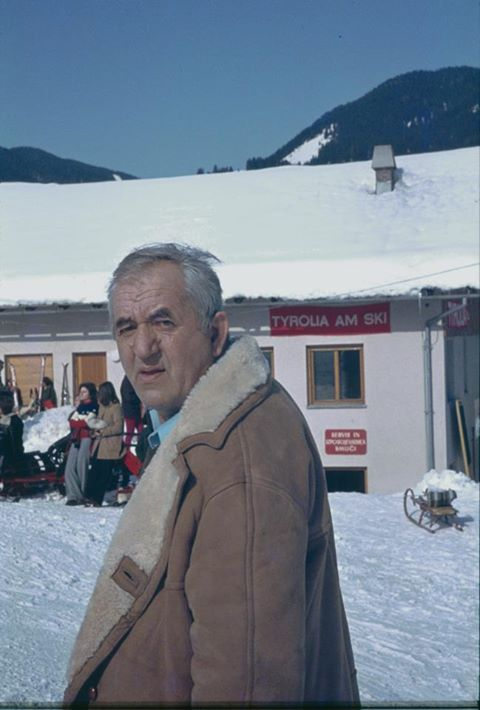

Personal information
- Nationality: Slovenian
- Born: 1 May 1911; Kranjska Gora, Austria-Hungary
- Died: 1986; Kranjska Gora

Sport
- Sport: Cross-country skiing

Leon Knap (born 1 May 1911, he died in 1987)

) was a Slovenian cross-country skier. He competed in the men's 18 kilometre event at the 1936 Winter Olympics.
