= Dimitar Kostov (cross-country skier) =

Bulgarian cross-country skier

Personal information
- Nationality: Bulgarian
- Born: 24 September 1907

Sport
- Sport: Cross-country skiing

Dimitar Kostov (Bulgarian: Димитър Костов, born 24 September 1907, date of death unknown) was a Bulgarian cross-country skier. He competed in the men's 18 kilometre event at the 1936 Winter Olympics.
