= Franc Smolej (skier) =

Personal information
- Born: 15 October 1908 Jesenice, Slovenia
- Died: 23 October 1996 (aged 88)

Sport
- Sport: Cross-country skiing

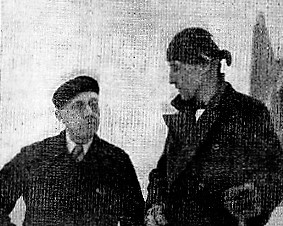
Joso Gorec and Franc Smolej

Franc Smolej (15 October 1908 – 23 October 1996) was a Slovenian cross-country skier. He competed for Yugoslavia in three events at the 1936 and 1948 Winter Olympics with the best result of 10–15th place in the 50 km event.
