= Nils-Joel Englund =

Swedish cross-country skier

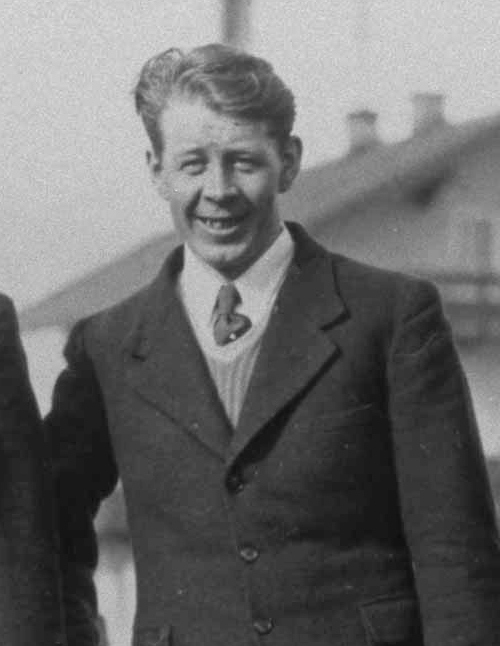
- Englund at the 1936 Olympics

Personal information
- Born: 7 April 1907 Överluleå, Sweden
- Died: 23 June 1995 (aged 88) Tierp, Sweden

Sport
- Sport: Cross-country skiing
- Club: Bodens BK
Medal record
Men's cross-country skiing
Representing Sweden
Olympic Games
Bronze medal – third place	1936 Garmisch-Partenkirchen	50 km
World Championships
Gold medal – first place	1933 Innsbruck	18 km
Gold medal – first place	1933 Innsbruck	4 × 10 km relay
Gold medal – first place	1935 Vysoké Tatry	50 km
Silver medal – second place	1934 Sollefteå	50 km
Bronze medal – third place	1934 Sollefteå	4 × 10 km relay
Bronze medal – third place	1935 Vysoké Tatry	4 × 10 km relay

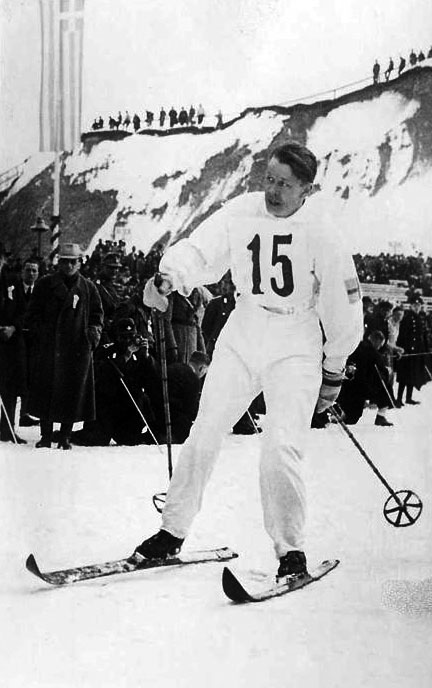
Nils-Joel Englund

Nils-Joel Englund (7 April 1907 – 22 June 1995) was a Swedish cross-country skier who competed in the 1930s. He won a bronze medal in 50 km at the 1936 Winter Olympics in Garmisch-Partenkirchen.

Englund also won six medals at the Nordic skiing World Championships, earning three golds (4 × 10 km relay and 18 km: 1933, 50 km: 1935), one silver (50 km: 1934), and two bronzes (4 × 10 km relay: 1934, 1935). After retiring from competitions he coached the Swiss national skiing team for two years. Then he worked at the Sundin ski factory and ran a sports store in Hudiksvall.

== Cross-country skiing results ==
All results are sourced from the International Ski Federation (FIS).

=== Olympic Games ===
- 1 medal – (1 bronze)

Year	Age	18 km	50 km	4 × 10 km relay
1936	28	—	Bronze	—

=== World Championships ===
- 6 medals – (3 gold, 1 silver, 2 bronze)

Year	Age	18 km	50 km	4 × 10 km relay
1933	25	Gold	—	Gold
1934	26	—	Silver	Bronze
1935	27	—	Gold	Bronze
1938	30	—	12	—
