= Ivan Angelakov =

Bulgarian cross-country skier

Personal information
- Nationality: Bulgarian
- Born: 24 March 1904

Sport
- Sport: Cross-country skiing

Ivan Angelakov (Bulgarian: Иван Ангелаков; born 24 March 1904, date of death unknown) was a Bulgarian cross-country skier. He competed in the men's 18 kilometre event at the 1936 Winter Olympics.
