= Alberts Riekstiņš =

Latvian cross-country skier (1907–2004)

Personal information
- Nationality: Latvian
- Born: 30 January 1907; Riga, Latvia
- Died: 8 December 2004 (aged 97)

Sport
- Sport: Cross-country skiing

Alberts Riekstiņš (30 January 1907 – 8 December 2004) was a Latvian cross-country skier. He competed in the men's 18 kilometre event at the 1936 Winter Olympics.
