= Cross-country skiing at the 1936 Winter Olympics =

Cross-country skiing at the IV Olympic Winter Games
- Dates: 6–16 February 1936
- No. of events: 3
- Competitors: 109 from 22 nations

The 1936 Winter Olympics were held in Garmisch-Partenkirchen, Germany. The games began on 6 February 1936, and ended on 16 February 1936. There were three cross-country skiing events held, in which only men competed. There were 109 male competitors from 22 different nations. The youngest participant was 17-year-old Resat Erces from Turkey, while the oldest participant was Nils Backstrom from the United States of America at 34 years old. The athletes whom collected the most medals were Oddbjørn Hagen of Norway, and Erik Larsson of Sweden – each received two medals. Sweden collected more medals than any other country in the cross-country skiing events at a total of five.

Events consisted of the 18 km and 50 km Classical, and the 4 × 10 km relay event was added. The relay event was held on Monday, 10 February 1936, the 18 km competition was held on Wednesday, 12 February 1936, and the 50 km event was held on Saturday, 15 February 1936.

Rule Changes Implemented: "International Olympic Committee ruled that ski instructors could not compete in the games because they were professionals. Austrian and Swiss skiers boycotted the Olympics, but some Austrians decided to compete under representation of Germany."

== Medal summary ==
=== Medal table ===
| Rank | Nation | Gold | Silver | Bronze | Total |
|---|---|---|---|---|---|
| 1 | Sweden | 2 | 1 | 2 | 5 |
| 2 | Finland | 1 | 0 | 1 | 2 |
| 3 | Norway | 0 | 2 | 0 | 2 |
| Totals (3 entries) | | 3 | 3 | 3 | 9 |

=== Events ===
| Event | Gold | | Silver | | Bronze | |
|---|---|---|---|---|---|---|
| 18 km | Erik August Larsson; Sweden | 1:14:38 | Oddbjørn Hagen; Norway | 1:15:33 | Pekka Niemi; Finland | 1:16:59 |
| 50 km | Elis Wiklund; Sweden | 3:30:11 | Axel Wikström; Sweden | 3:33:20 | Nils-Joel Englund; Sweden | 3:34:10 |
| 4 × 10 km relay | Finland; Sulo Nurmela; Klaes Karppinen; Matti Lähde; Kalle Jalkanen | 2:41:33 | Norway; Oddbjørn Hagen; Olaf Hoffsbakken; Sverre Brodahl; Bjarne Iversen | 2:41:39 | Sweden; John Berger; Erik August Larsson; Arthur Häggblad; Martin Matsbo | 2:43:03 |

== Participating nations ==
Ten cross-country skiers competed in all three events.

A total of 109 cross-country skiers from 22 nations competed at the Garmisch-Partenkirchen Games:

- Austria (5)
- Bulgaria (4)
- Canada (4)
- Czechoslovakia (6)
- Estonia (1)
- Finland (7)
- France (4)
- Germany (10)
- Great Britain (1)
- Greece (1)
- Italy (7)
- Japan (5)
- Latvia (5)
- Norway (7)
- Poland (4)
- Romania (4)
- Spain (4)
- Sweden (9)
- Switzerland (4)
- Turkey (4)
- United States (6)
- Yugoslavia (6)

== Sources ==
- "1936 Winter Olympics Cross Country Skiing – Google Search." 1936 Winter Olympics Cross Country Skiing – Google Search. N.p., n.d. Web. 11 November 2014.
- "Olympic Games Medals, Results, Sports, Athletes | Medailles, Resultats, Sports Et Athletes Des Jeux Olympiques." Olympic Games Medals, Results, Sports, Athletes | Medailles, Resultats, Sports Et Athletes Des Jeux Olympiques. N.p., n.d. Web. 8 November 2014.
- "1936 Winter Olympics Cross Country Skiing – Google Search." 1936 Winter Olympics Cross Country Skiing – Google Search. N.p., n.d. Web. 6 November 2014.
- "Cross Country Skiing at the 1936 Garmisch-Partenkirchen Winter Games." Olympics at Sports-Reference.com. N.p., n.d. Web. 11 November 2014.
- International Olympic Committee results database
