= Pauls Kaņeps =

Latvian cross-country skier (1911–2006)

Personal information
- Nationality: Latvian
- Born: 14 November 1911
- Died: 9 November 2006 (aged 94); Elgin, Illinois, United States

Sport
- Sport: Cross-country skiing

Pauls Kaņeps (14 November 1911 – 9 November 2006) was a Latvian cross-country skier. He competed in the men's 18 kilometre event at the 1936 Winter Olympics.
