= John Berger (cross-country skier) =

Swedish cross-country skier

Olympic medal record

Men's cross-country skiing

Representing Sweden

Olympic Games
Bronze medal – third place	1936 Garmisch-Partenkirchen	4 × 10 km relay

John Berger (31 July 1909 – 12 January 2002) was a Swedish cross-country skier who competed in the 1930s. He was born in Överluleå and won a bronze medal in the 4 × 10 km relay at the 1936 Winter Olympics in Garmisch-Partenkirchen.

== Cross-country skiing results ==
=== Olympic Games ===
- 1 medal – (1 bronze)

Year	Age	18 km	50 km	4 × 10 km relay
1936	26	—	—	Bronze

=== World Championships ===
Year	Age	18 km	50 km	4 × 10 km relay
1938	28	13	—	—
