= Matti Lähde =

Finnish cross-country skier (1911–1978)

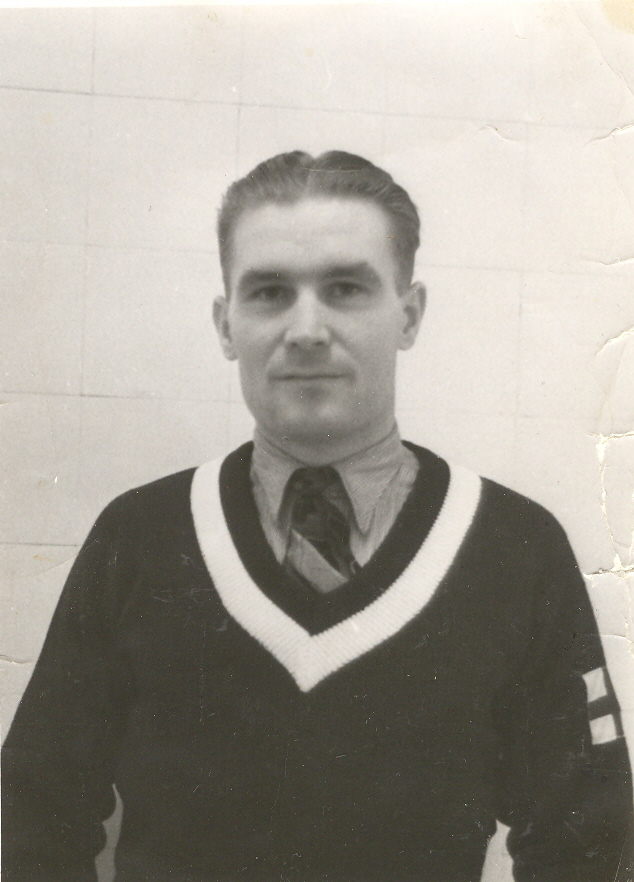
- Matti Lähde in 1936

Medal record

Men's cross-country skiing

Representing Finland

Olympic Games
Gold medal – first place	1936 Garmisch-Partenkirchen	4x10 km

Matti Ensio Lähde (14 May 1911, Joutseno – 2 May 1978) was a Finnish cross-country skier who competed in the 1930s. He won a gold medal at the 1936 Winter Olympics in Garmisch-Partenkirchen in the 4 × 10 km relay.

== Cross-country skiing results ==
=== Olympic Games ===
- 1 medal – (1 gold)

Year	Age	18 km	50 km	4 × 10 km relay
1936	24	15	—	Gold

=== World Championships ===
Year	Age	18 km	50 km	4 × 10 km relay
1938	26	16	—	—
