= Arthur Häggblad =

Swedish cross-country skier

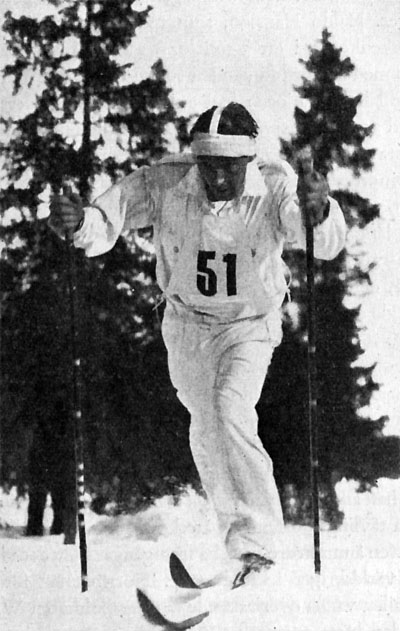
- Arthur Häggblad by the mid-1930s

Personal information
- Born: 14 August 1908 Nordmaling, Sweden
- Died: 16 June 1989 (aged 80) Stockholm, Sweden

Sport
- Sport: Cross-country skiing
- Club: IFK Umeå
Medal record
Men's cross-country skiing
Representing Sweden
Olympic Games
Bronze medal – third place	1936 Garmisch-Partenkirchen	4 × 10 km relay
World Championships
Bronze medal – third place	1934 Sollefteå	4 × 10 km relay

Arthur Häggblad (14 August 1908 – 16 June 1989) was a Swedish cross-country skier who competed in the 1930s. He won a bronze medal in the 4 × 10 km relay at the 1936 Winter Olympics in Garmisch-Partenkirchen. Häggblad's best individual finishes were fourth in both the 18 km and 50 km events at the 1934 FIS Nordic World Ski Championships. He would also win a bronze medal in the 4 × 10 km relay at those championships.

In 1933, 1935, 1937 and 1940, he won Vasaloppet.

Häggblad was known for his blunt public statements. For example, when a governor once asked him in the 1930s how was the race, he replied "Run for yourself, you old bastard – so you can see how it feels."

After retiring from competitions Häggblad worked in a sports store. He was featured in the 1988 documentary film De sista skidåkarna (The Last Skiers).

== Cross-country skiing results ==
All results are sourced from the International Ski Federation (FIS).

=== Olympic Games ===
- 1 medal – (1 bronze)

Year	Age	18 km	50 km	4 × 10 km relay
1936	27	8	—	Bronze

=== World Championships ===
- 1 medal – (1 bronze)

Year	Age	18 km	50 km	4 × 10 km relay
1934	25	4	4	Bronze
1938	28	—	13	—
