= Klaes Karppinen =

Finnish cross-country skier

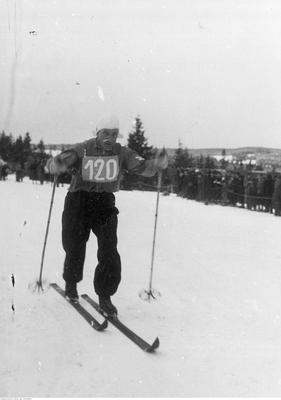
- Zakopane MM 1939 - Klaes Karppinen.jpg

Medal record

Men's cross-country skiing

Representing Finland

Olympic Games
Gold medal – first place	1936 Garmisch-Partenkirchen	4 × 10 km relay

World Championships
Gold medal – first place	1934 Sollefteå	4 × 10 km relay
Gold medal – first place	1935 Vysoké Tatry	18 km
Gold medal – first place	1935 Vysoké Tatry	4 × 10 km relay
Gold medal – first place	1938 Lahti	4 × 10 km relay
Gold medal – first place	1939 Zakopane	4 × 10 km relay
Silver medal – second place	1935 Vysoké Tatry	50 km
Silver medal – second place	1937 Chamonix	4 × 10 km relay
Silver medal – second place	1937 Chamonix	50 km
Silver medal – second place	1939 Zakopane	18 km
Silver medal – second place	1939 Zakopane	50 km

Klaes Karppinen (also spelled Klaus; 9 October 1907 – 24 January 1992) was a Finnish cross-country skier who competed in the 1930s. He won a gold medal at the 1936 Winter Olympics in Garmisch-Partenkirchen in the 4 × 10 km relay. Karppinen was born in Iisalmi, Finland.

Karppinen's biggest successes were at the Nordic skiing World Championships where he earned 10 medals, including five golds (18 km: 1935, 4 × 10 km relay: 1934, 1935, 1938, 1939) and five silvers (18 km: 1939; 50 km: 1935, 1937, 1939; and 4 × 10 km relay: 1937).

== Cross-country skiing results ==
All results are sourced from the International Ski Federation (FIS).

=== Olympic Games ===
- 1 medal – (1 gold)

Year	Age	18 km	50 km	4 × 10 km relay
1936	28	—	5	Gold

=== World Championships ===
- 10 medals – (5 gold, 5 silver)

Year	Age	18 km	50 km	4 × 10 km relay
1934	26	5	DNF	Gold
1935	27	Gold	Silver	Gold
1937	29	—	Silver	Silver
1938	30	14	5	Gold
1939	31	Silver	Silver	Gold
