= Elis Wiklund =

Swedish cross-country skier

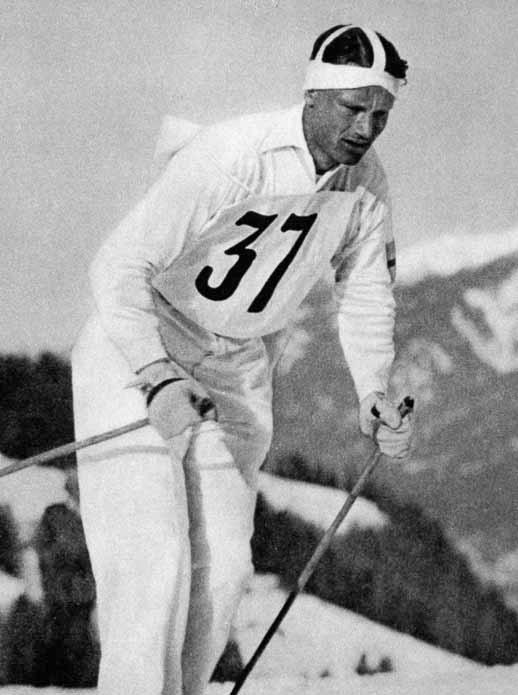
- Wiklund at the 1936 Winter Olympics

Personal information
- Born: 10 December 1909 Ullånger, Sweden
- Died: 15 March 1982 (aged 72) Sollefteå, Sweden
- Height: 185 cm (6 ft 1 in)
- Weight: 80 kg (176 lb)

Sport
- Sport: Cross-country skiing
- Club: Kramfors IF
Medal record
Men's cross-country skiing
Representing Sweden
Olympic Games
Gold medal – first place	1936 Garmisch-Partenkirchen	50 km
World Championships
Gold medal – first place	1934 Sollefteå	50 km

Elis Wiklund (12 December 1909 – 15 March 1982) was a Swedish cross-country skier who won the 50 km race at the 1934 FIS Nordic World Ski Championships and 1936 Winter Olympics.

Wiklund won two individual Swedish titles: in the 30 km in 1938 and in the 50 km in 1941. He was an accomplished accordion player, and produced records in 1936. In 1946 he briefly worked as a skiing coach in Switzerland, and after returning opened a sports shop in Sollefteå. Later he became an owner of a ski wax factory. His life was featured in the novel Hjältedrömmen (A Hero’s Dream) by Karl-Erik Johansson.

== Cross-country skiing results ==
All results are sourced from the International Ski Federation (FIS).

=== Olympic Games ===
- 1 medal – (1 gold)

Year	Age	18 km	50 km	4 × 10 km relay
1936	26	—	Gold	—

=== World Championships ===
- 1 medal – (1 gold)

Year	Age	18 km	50 km	4 × 10 km relay
1934	24	—	Gold	—
1938	28	—	21	—
