= Sulo Nurmela =

Finnish cross-country skier

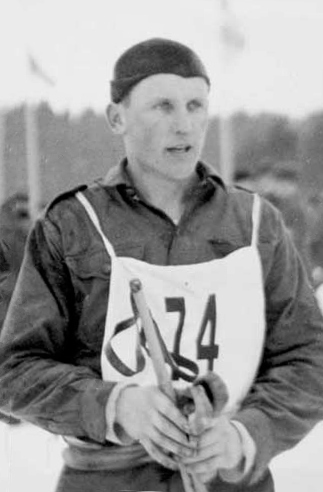
- Sulo Nurmela in 1937

Personal information
- Born: 13 February 1908 Onkamaa, Miehikkälä, Finland
- Died: 13 August 1999 (aged 91) Hamina, Finland
- Height: 173 cm (5 ft 8 in)
- Weight: 62–69 kg (137–152 lb)

Sport
- Sport: Cross-country skiing
- Club: Vehkaladen Veikot
Medal record
Men's cross-country skiing
Representing Finland
Olympic Games
Gold medal – first place	1936 Garmisch-Partenkirchen	4 × 10 km relay
World Championships
Gold medal – first place	1934 Sollefteå	18 km
Gold medal – first place	1934 Sollefteå	4 × 10 km relay
Gold medal – first place	1935 Vysoké Tatry	4 × 10 km relay

Sulo Nurmela (13 February 1908 – 13 August 1999) was a Finnish cross-country skier. He won a gold medal at the 1936 Winter Olympics in the 4 × 10 km relay and served as the Finnish flag bearer at those games.

Nurmela won two world titles in 1934: in the individual 18 km and 4 × 10 km relay events. While traveling to Czechoslovakia to the next world championships he became ill with a high fever and had to withdraw from his individual races. Yet he felt obliged to compete in the relay, as Finland had sent only four skiers, and there was no substitute. His first three teammates gained a two-minute lead, and Nurmela managed to finish more than a minute ahead of the competitors and win his third world title.

Nurmela won three races in the Lahti Ski Games: 17 km in 1934 and 1937 and 50 km in 1937. He retired after placing eighth over 50 km at the 1938 World Championships. He worked as a farmer most of his life.

== Cross-country skiing results ==
All results are sourced from the International Ski Federation (FIS).

=== Olympic Games ===
- 1 medal – (1 gold)

Year	Age	18 km	50 km	4 × 10 km relay
1936	28	7	—	Gold

=== World Championships ===
- 3 medals – (3 gold)

Year	Age	18 km	50 km	4 × 10 km relay
1934	26	Gold	—	Gold
1935	27	—	—	Gold
1938	30	—	8	—
