= Erik Larsson (skier) =

Swedish cross-country skier

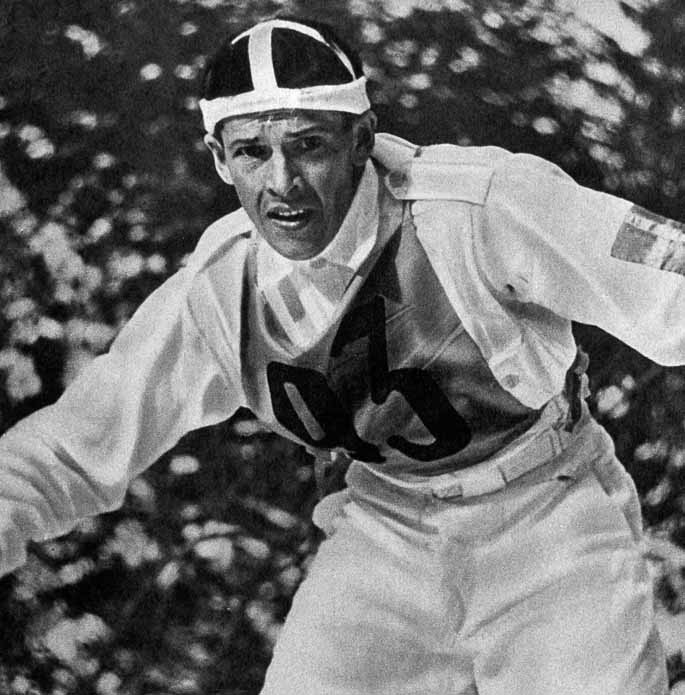
- Erik Larsson at the 1936 Olympics

Personal information
- Born: 12 April 1912 Kurravaara, Sweden
- Died: 10 March 1982 (aged 69) Kiruna, Sweden
- Height: 163 cm (5 ft 4 in)
- Weight: 59 kg (130 lb)

Sport
- Sport: Cross-country skiing
- Club: IFK Kiruna
Medal record
Men's cross-country skiing
Representing Sweden
Olympic Games
Gold medal – first place	1936 Garmisch-Partenkirchen	18 km
Bronze medal – third place	1936 Garmisch-Partenkirchen	4 × 10 km relay
World Championships
Bronze medal – third place	1935 Vysoké Tatry	4 × 10 km relay

Erik August Larsson (12 April 1912 – 10 March 1982) was a Swedish cross-country skier who competed in the 1930s. He won two medals at the 1936 Winter Olympics in Garmisch-Partenkirchen with a gold in the 18 km and a bronze in the 4 × 10 km relay. The same year he was awarded the Svenska Dagbladet Gold Medal. Larsson also won a bronze in the 4 × 10 km relay at the 1935 FIS Nordic World Ski Championships.

Larsson was born as the second youngest of six siblings in a religious Finnish-speaking family. In 1935, he started working as a cleaner at the Kiruna iron ore mine in the summer and as a lumberjack in the winter. In 1939, after attending a prayer meeting in Kurravaara he gave up his sport career and became a Laestadian Christian. He was later a preacher in the Firstborn Laestadian congregation in Kiruna. His son Lars became a preacher in Luleå, while his granddaughter Åsa Larsson was a tax lawyer and a writer of crime novels.

== Cross-country skiing results ==
All results are sourced from the International Ski Federation (FIS).

=== Olympic Games ===
- 2 medals – (1 gold, 1 bronze)

Year	Age	18 km	50 km	4 × 10 km relay
1936	23	Gold	—	Bronze

=== World Championships ===
- 1 medal – (1 bronze)

Year	Age	18 km	50 km	4 × 10 km relay
1935	22	24	DNF	Bronze
1938	25	12	DNS	—

Preceded by Hans Drakenberg	Svenska Dagbladet Gold Medal; 1936	Succeeded by Torsten Ullman
