= United States at the 1936 Winter Olympics =

- Flag of the United States
- IOC code: USA
- NOC: United States Olympic Committee

in Garmisch-Partenkirchen
- Competitors: 55 (46 men, 9 women) in 4 sports
- Flag bearer: Rolf Monsen
- Medals Ranked 8th: Gold 1 Silver 0 Bronze 3 Total 4

Winter Olympics appearances (overview)
- 1924; 1928; 1932; 1936; 1948; 1952; 1956; 1960; 1964; 1968; 1972; 1976; 1980; 1984; 1988; 1992; 1994; 1998; 2002; 2006; 2010; 2014; 2018; 2022; 2026

The United States competed at the 1936 Winter Olympics in Garmisch-Partenkirchen, Germany.

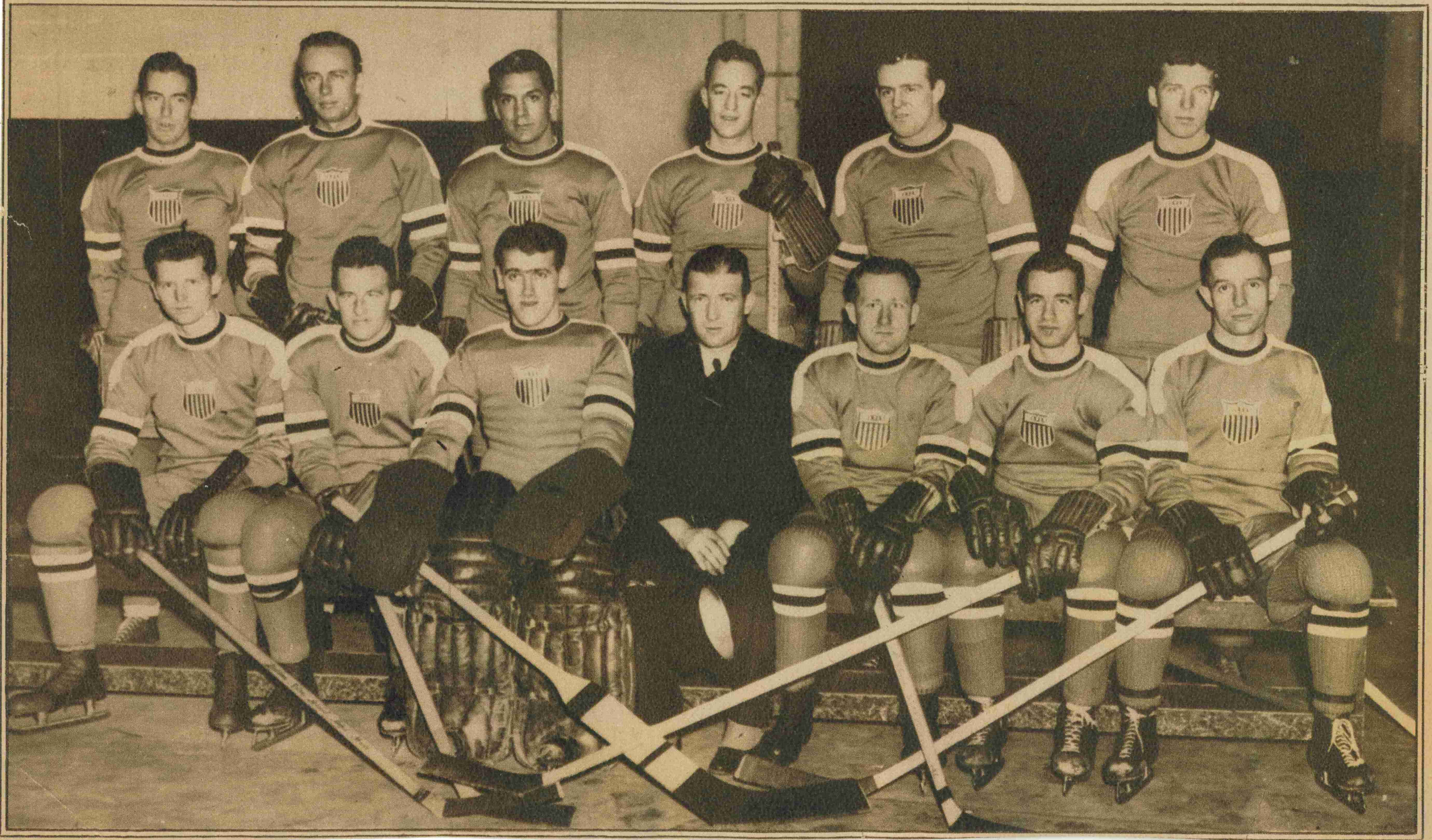
Photograph of the 1936 American Ice Hockey squad from the January 5, 1936 edition of The New York Times (Times Wide World Photos.)

== Medalists ==
The following U.S. competitors won medals at the games. In the by discipline sections below, medalists' names are bolded.

Medal	Name	Sport	Event	Date
Gold	Ivan Brown; Alan Washbond	Bobsleigh	Two-man	February 15
Bronze	Leo Freisinger	Speed skating	500 meters	February 11
Bronze	Gilbert Colgate; Richard Lawrence	Bobsleigh	Two-man	February 15
Bronze	United States men's national ice hockey team: John Garrison; August Kammer; Philip LaBatte; John Lax; Thomas Moone; Elbridge Ross; Paul Rowe; Francis Shaughnessy; Gordon Smith; Francis Spain; Frank Stubbs	Ice hockey	Men's tournament	February 16

== Alpine skiing ==
Men

Athlete	Event	Downhill		Slalom				Total	
Athlete	Event	Time	Points	Time 1	Time 2	Total	Points	Average points	Rank
Dick Durrance	Combined	5:16.2	90.89	1:26.4 (+0:06)	1:26.9	2:53.3	84.59	87.74	10
Robert Livermore	Combined	6:04.4	78.87	1:37.5	1:36.7	3:14.2	75.49	77.18	23
George Page	Combined	5:42.8	83.84	1:25.7	1:33.4	2:59.1	81.86	82.85	13
Albert Washburn	Combined	6:30.8	73.54	1:56.7 (+0:06)	Did not advance				

Women

Athlete	Event	Downhill		Slalom				Total	
Athlete	Event	Time	Points	Time 1	Time 2	Total	Points	Average points	Rank
Mary Bird	Combined	8:32.4	59.41	2:38.9	Did not advance				
Helen Boughton-Leigh	Combined	7:17.4	69.59	1:46.7	1:50.8	3:37.5	65.33	67.46	21
Clarita Heath	Combined	7:39.2	66.29	2:25.4	2:00.3	4:25.7	53.48	59.89	27
Elizabeth Woolsey	Combined	6:12.8	81.68	2:00.8	2:09.3	4:10.1	56.82	69.24	19

== Bobsleigh ==
Athlete	Event	Run 1		Run 2		Run 3		Run 4		Total	
Athlete	Event	Time	Rank	Time	Rank	Time	Rank	Time	Rank	Time	Rank
**Ivan Brown**; **Alan Washbond**	Two-man	1:22.50	1	1:21.02	2	1:25.39	3	1:20.38	2	5:29.29	1st place, gold medalist(s)
**Gilbert Colgate**; **Richard Lawrence**	Two-man	1:25.06	2	1:21.94	3	1:24.80	2	1:22.16	3	5:33.96	3rd place, bronze medalist(s)
Hubert Stevens; Crawford Merkel; Robert Martin; John Shene	Four-man	1:25.61	8	1:19.17	2	1:20.51	3	1:18.84	2	5:24.13	4
Francis Tyler; James Bickford; Richard Lawrence; Max Bly	Four-man	1:25.61	8	1:23.85	10	1:20.22	2	1:19.32	5	5:29.00	6

== Cross-country skiing ==
Athlete	Event	Time	Rank
Warren Chivers	18 km	1:30:25	48
Richard Parsons	18 km	1:30:09	46
Karl Magnus Satre	18 km	1:25:56	34
Berger Torrissen	18 km	1:29:08	45
Nils Backstrom	50 km	4:29:30	33
Richard Parsons	50 km	4:11:08	29
Karl Magnus Satre	50 km	3:58:45	18
Berger Torrissen	50 km	4:07:44	27
Warren Chivers; Richard Parsons; Karl Satre; Birger Torrissen	4 × 10 km relay	3:06:26	11

== Figure skating ==
Men

Athlete	Event	CF	FS	Total		
Athlete	Event	Rank	Rank	Places	Points	Rank
George Hill	Men's singles	18	23	148	325.1	22
Robin Lee	Men's singles	13	13	80	363.0	12
Erle Reiter	Men's singles	12	17	95	352.9	13

Women

Athlete	Event	CF	FS	Total		
Athlete	Event	Rank	Rank	Places	Points	Rank
Audrey Peppe	Ladies' singles	18	8	85	363.3	12
Maribel Vinson	Ladies' singles	6	7	39	388.7	5
Estelle Weigel	Ladies' singles	23	22	151	324.5	22
Louise Weigel	Ladies' singles	22	20	140	336.4	21

Mixed

Athlete	Event	Points	Score	Rank
Grace Madden; James Madden	Pairs	95	9.1	11
Maribel Vinson; George Hill	Pairs	46.5	10.4	5

== Ice hockey ==
Summary

Team	Event	First round				Second round				Medal round		
Team	Event	Opposition Score	Opposition Score	Opposition Score	Rank	Opposition Score	Opposition Score	Opposition Score	Rank	Opposition Score	Opposition Score	Rank
**United States men**	Men's tournament	Germany; **W** 1–0	Switzerland; **W** 3–0	Italy; **L** 1–2	2 **Q**	Czechoslovakia; **W** 2–0	Austria; **W** 1–0	Sweden; **W** 2–1	1 **Q**	Great Britain; **T** 0–0	Canada; **L** 0–1	3rd place, bronze medalist(s)

Roster

Thomas Moone
Francis Shaughnessy
Philip LaBatte
Frank Stubbs
John Garrison
Paul Rowe
John Lax
Gordon Smith
Elbridge Ross
Francis Spain
August Kammer

First round
Top two teams advanced to semifinals

	Pld	W	L	T	GF	GA	Pts
Germany	3	2	1	0	5	1	**4**
United States	3	2	1	0	5	2	**4**
Italy	3	1	2	0	2	5	**2**
Switzerland	3	1	2	0	1	5	**2**

6 February	Germany	**0-1** (0-1,0-0,0-0)	United States
7 February	United States	**3-0** (0-0,3-0,0-0)	Switzerland
8 February	United States	**1-2** (0-0,0-0,1-1,0-0,0-1)	Italy

Second round
Top two teams advanced to Medal round

	Pld	W	L	T	GF	GA	Pts
United States	3	3	0	0	5	1	**6**
Czechoslovakia	3	2	1	0	6	4	**4**
Sweden	3	1	0	2	3	6	**2**
Austria	3	0	3	0	1	4	**0**

11 February	United States	**2-0** (0-0,2-0,0-0)	Czechoslovakia
12 February	United States	**1-0** (0-0,1-0,0-0)	Austria
13 February	United States	**2-1** (0-0,1-1,1-0)	Sweden

Medal round

	Pld	W	L	T	GF	GA	Pts
Great Britain	3	2	0	1	7	1	**5**
Canada	3	2	1	0	9	2	**4**
United States	3	1	1	1	2	1	**3**
Czechoslovakia	3	0	3	0	0	14	**0**

Relevant results from the semifinal were carried over to the final

11 February	United States	**2-0** (0-0, 2–0, 0-0)	Czechoslovakia
15 February	Great Britain	**0-0** (0-0,0-0,0-0,0-0,0-0,0-0)	United States
16 February	Canada	**1-0** (1-0,0-0,0-0)	United States

== Nordic combined ==
The cross-country skiing part of this event was combined with the 18 kilometer race of cross-country skiing. Those results can be found above in this article in the cross-country skiing section. Some athletes (but not all) entered in both the cross-country skiing and Nordic combined event; their time on the 18 km was used for both events.

The ski jumping (normal hill) event was held separate from the main medal event of ski jumping, results can be found in the table below.

Athlete	Event	Cross-country			Ski Jumping				Total	
Athlete	Event	Time	Points	Rank	Distance 1	Distance 2	Total points	Rank	Points	Rank
Edward Blood	Individual	1:33:45	142.5	42	44.0	43.0	183.1	26	325.5	37
Karl Magnus Satre	Individual	1:25:56	181.8	24	39.0	41.0	174.0	35	355.8	27
Paul Ottar Satre	Individual	1:36:27	129.4	45	48.5	53.0	144.5	44	273.9	44
Berger Torrissen	Individual	1:29:08	165.3	29	45.0	44.0	190.2	19	355.5	28

== Ski jumping ==
Athlete	Event	Jump 1			Jump 2			Total	
Athlete	Event	Distance	Points	Rank	Distance	Points	Rank	Points	Rank
Walter Bietila	Normal hill	66.5	100.4	24	63.5	94.8	34	195.2	30
Sverre Fredheim	Normal hill	73.5	107.7	10	73.0	106.4	10	214.1	11
Roy Mikkelsen	Normal hill	69.5	102.0	18	68.0	100.6	25	202.6	23
Caspar Oimoen	Normal hill	71.5	100.5	23	72.5	107.1	9	207.6	13

== Speed skating ==
Athlete	Event	Time	Rank
**Leo Freisinger**	500 m	44.0	3rd place, bronze medalist(s)
Del Lamb	500 m	44.2	5
Robert Petersen	500 m	45.0	11
Allan Potts	500 m	44.8	6
Leo Freisinger	1500 m	2:21.3	4
Robert Petersen	1500 m	2:25.4	17
Allan Potts	1500 m	2:31.2	32
Eddie Schroeder	1500 m	2:24.3	12
Robert Petersen	5000 m	8:46.5	11
Eddie Schroeder	5000 m	8:49.1	15
Robert Petersen	10,000 m	DNF	
Eddie Schroeder	10,000 m	17:52.0	8
