= Nordic combined at the 1936 Winter Olympics =

Nordic combined at the IV Olympic Winter Games
- Venue: Kleine Olympiaschanze
- Dates: 12–13 February 1936
- Competitors: 51 from 16 nations
- Winning Score: 430.3

Medalists
1st place, gold medalist(s)		Oddbjørn Hagen	Norway
2nd place, silver medalist(s)		Olaf Hoffsbakken	Norway
3rd place, bronze medalist(s)		Sverre Brodahl	Norway

At the 1936 Winter Olympics, one individual Nordic combined event was contested. It was held on Wednesday, February 12, 1936 (cross-country skiing) and on Thursday, February 13, 1936 (ski jumping).

== Medalists ==
Gold	Silver	Bronze
Oddbjørn Hagen; Norway	Olaf Hoffsbakken; Norway	Sverre Brodahl; Norway

== Results ==
=== Cross-country skiing ===
The 18 kilometre cross-country skiing race was held on Wednesday, February 12, 1936, as part of the special 18 kilometre cross-country race.

The race started at 10:01 a.m. There was a gap of 30 seconds between each starter. The highest point was at 1010 metres and the lowest point was at 735 metres. The conditions were good with temperatures between -4.8° to -2° Celsius.

Oddbjørn Hagen the winner of this Nordic combined cross-country skiing race won for his performance also a silver medal in the competition of the specialists. In total 16 competitors participated in both events and were also placed in the separate 18 kilometre race.

Place	No.	Competitor	Time	Difference	Points
1	59	Oddbjørn Hagen (NOR)	1'15:33		240.0
2	102	Olaf Hoffsbakken (NOR)	1'17:37	+2:04	227.8
3	19	Sverre Brodahl (NOR)	1'18:01	+2:28	225.5
4	95	František Šimůnek (TCH)	1'19:09	+3:36	219.0
5	27	Severino Menardi (ITA)	1'20:34	+5:01	211.0
6	40	Bernt Østerkløft (NOR)	1'21:37	+6:04	205.1
7	114	Hans Baumann (AUT)	1'22:49	+7:16	198.5
8	63	Gustl Berauer (TCH)	1'23:04	+7:31	197.2
9	43	Niilo Nikunen (FIN)	1'23:59	+8:26	192.2
10	1	Willy Bogner (GER)	1'24:11	+8:38	191.2
11	24	Josef Gumpold (GER)	1'24:19	+8:46	190.4
12	106	Friedl Wagner (GER)	1'24:33	+9:00	189.2
13	80	Timo Murama (FIN)	1'24:52	+9:19	187.5
14	66	Andrea Vuerich (ITA)	1'25:01	+9:28	186.7
15	108	Hubert Köstinger (AUT)	1'25:09	+9:36	186.0
16	23	Johann Lahr (TCH)	1'25:11	+9:38	185.8
17	109	Willi Bernath (SUI)	1'25:12	+9:39	185.7
18	73	Stanisław Marusarz (POL)	1'25:27	+9:54	184.4
18	35	Marian Woyna-Orlewicz (POL)	1'25:27	+9:54	184.4
20	41	Jonas Westman (SWE)	1'25:38	+10:05	183.4
21	69	Oswald Julen (SUI)	1'25:43	+10:10	183.0
22	110	Harald Hedjersson (SWE)	1'25:50	+10:17	182.4
23	90	Bronisław Czech (POL)	1'25:55	+10:22	181.9
24	32	Karl Satre (USA)	1'25:56	+10:23	181.8
25	115	Pertti Mattila (FIN)	1'26:21	+10:48	179.7
26	22	Lauri Valonen (FIN)	1'26:34	+11:01	178.6
27	99	Ernst Berger (SUI)	1'27:13	+11:40	175.2
28	98	Markus Mayer (AUT)	1'27:31	+11:58	173.7
29	88	Birger Torrissen (USA)	1'29:08	+13:35	165.3
30	97	Tone Dečman (YUG)	1'29:44	+14:11	162.3
31	103	Holger Lundgren (SWE)	1'29:57	+14:24	161.2
32	65	Albin Jakopič (YUG)	1'30:02	+14:29	160.8
33	74	William Clark (CAN)	1'30:20	+14:47	159.3
34	81	Rudolf Vrána (TCH)	1'30:26	+14:53	158.8
35	68	Shinzo Yamada (JPN)	1'31:28	+15:55	153.6
36	101	Andrzej Marusarz (POL)	1'31:30	+15:57	153.4
37	96	Anton Eisgruber (GER)	1'31:38	+16:05	152.8
38	86	Isamo Sekiguchi (JPN)	1'32:40	+17:07	147.7
39	56	William Ball (CAN)	1'32:46	+17:13	147.3
40	30	Tsutomu Sekido (JPN)	1'32:48	+17:15	147.0
41	15	Tormod Mobraaten (CAN)	1'33:28	+17:55	143.8
42	100	Edward Blood (USA)	1'33:45	+18:12	142.4
43	46	Leon Bebler (YUG)	1'34:25	+18:52	139.2
44	54	Edgars Gruzītis (LAT)	1'35:22	+19:49	134.6
45	70	Paul Satre (USA)	1'36:27	+20:54	129.4
46	67	Walter Delle Karth (AUT)	1'37:14	+21:41	125.8
47	37	Karl Baadsvik (CAN)	1'39:30	+23:57	115.2
48	14	Percy Legard (GBR)	1'47:47	+32:14	76.8
–	5	Károly Kővári (HUN)	–	–	DNF
–	28	László Szalay (HUN)	–	–	DNF
–	113	Rado Istenič (YUG)	–	–	DNF

=== Final standings ===
Place	No.	Competitor	Total
1	59	Oddbjørn Hagen (NOR)	430.3
2	102	Olaf Hoffsbakken (NOR)	419.8
3	19	Sverre Brodahl (NOR)	408.1
4	22	Lauri Valonen (FIN)	401.2
5	95	František Šimůnek (TCH)	394.3
6	40	Bernt Østerkløft (NOR)	393.8
7	73	Stanisław Marusarz (POL)	393.3
7	80	Timo Murama (FIN)	393.3
9	23	Johann Lahr (TCH)	387.4
10	43	Niilo Nikunen (FIN)	383.8
11	41	Jonas Westman (SWE)	382.7
12	1	Willy Bogner (GER)	381.5
13	24	Josef Gumpold (GER)	380.7
14	63	Gustl Berauer (TCH)	379.1
15	108	Hubert Köstinger (AUT)	375.2
16	90	Bronisław Czech (POL)	375.0
17	114	Hans Baumann (AUT)	372.1
18	106	Friedl Wagner (GER)	371.9
19	115	Pertti Mattila (FIN)	368.4
20	27	Severino Menardi (ITA)	368.3
21	69	Oswald Julen (SUI)	367.3
22	109	Willi Bernath (SUI)	366.4
23	96	Anton Eisgruber (GER)	364.9
24	35	Marian Woyna-Orlewicz (POL)	363.8
25	98	Markus Maier (AUT)	361.9
26	81	Rudolf Vrána (TCH)	359.4
27	32	Karl Satre (USA)	355.8
28	88	Birger Torrissen (USA)	355.5
29	86	Isamo Sekiguchi (JPN)	350.9
30	99	Ernst Berger (SUI)	350.1
31	15	Tormod Mobraaten (CAN)	348.8
32	101	Andrzej Marusarz (POL)	345.5
33	67	Walter Delle Karth (AUT)	333.2
34	97	Tone Dečman (YUG)	331.4
35	30	Tsutomu Sekido (JPN)	330.3
36	65	Albin Jakopič (YUG)	327.7
37	100	Edward Blood (USA)	325.5
38	46	Leon Bebler (YUG)	316.7
39	74	William Clark (CAN)	315.4
40	103	Holger Lundgren (SWE)	313.2
41	37	Karl Baadsvik (CAN)	306.9
42	54	Edgars Gruzītis (LAT)	282.7
43	68	Shinzo Yamada (JPN)	278.8
44	70	Paul Satre (USA)	273.9
45	14	Percy Legard (GBR)	249.3
46	56	William Ball (CAN)	244.7
–	66	Andrea Vuerich (ITA)	DNF
–	110	Harald Hedjersson (SWE)	DNF
–	5	Károly Kővári (HUN)	DNF
–	28	László Szalay (HUN)	DNF
–	113	Rado Istenič (YUG)	DNF

== Participating nations ==
A total of 51 Nordic combined skiers from 16 nations competed at the Garmisch-Partenkirchen Games:

- Austria (4)
- Canada (4)
- Czechoslovakia (4)
- Finland (4)
- Germany (4)
- Great Britain (1)
- Hungary (2)
- Italy (2)
- Japan (3)
- Latvia (1)
- Norway (4)
- Poland (4)
- Sweden (3)
- Switzerland (3)
- United States (4)
- Yugoslavia (4)
