= List of Olympic venues in figure skating =

For the Summer and Winter Olympics, there are 27 venues that have been or will be used for figure skating. This is one of two sports in the Winter Olympics to debut in the Summer Olympics with ice hockey being the other. The first venue for the event took place during the 1908 Games was held indoors. Twelve years later, the venue joined ice hockey as another Winter Olympic sport in the Summer Olympics. For the first two Winter Olympics, figure skating was held outdoors. With figure skating being held outdoors, there were weather concerns with thawing for the first two Winter Games. A suggestion by International Olympic Committee President Count Henri de Baillet-Latour to 1932 Olympic Organizing Committee President Godfrey Dewey in September 1930 led Dewey to create the first indoor arena for the Winter Olympics. For the 1936 Games, the venue was covered partially. Following World War II, the 1948 venue became the first venue to be used twice at the Winter Olympics since it had been used twenty years earlier. Figure skating's final competition that took place outdoors was in 1956 though that venue has since had a roof added to it. Since 1960, all figure skating competitions have taken place indoors. Three National Hockey League (NHL) venues have hosted Olympic figure skating competitions: the 1988 (both venues) and the 2010 though the NHL Vancouver Canucks moved out of the 2010 venue following the 1994–95 season. The 2002 venue was a National Basketball Association (NBA) venue which meant the Utah Jazz was on a road trip during the 2002 Games.

Games	Venue	Other sports hosted at venue for those games	Capacity	Ref.
1908 London	Prince's Skating Club	None	Not listed.	
1920 Antwerp	Palais de Glace d'Anvers	Ice hockey	Not listed.	
1924 Chamonix	Stade Olympique de Chamonix	Cross-country skiing, Curling, Ice hockey, Military patrol, Nordic combined (cross-country skiing), Speed skating	45,000.	
1928 St. Moritz	St. Moritz Olympic Ice Rink	Ice hockey, Speed skating	4000	
1932 Lake Placid	Jack Shea Arena	Ice hockey (final)	3360	
1936 Garmisch-Partenkirchen	Olympia-Kunsteisstadion	Ice hockey (final)	17,000	
1948 St. Moritz	Olympic Stadium	Ice hockey (final), Speed skating	Not listed.	
1952 Oslo	Bislett stadion	Bandy (demonstration), Speed skating	29,000	
1956 Cortina d'Ampezzo	Olympic Ice Stadium	Ice hockey	12,042	
1960 Squaw Valley	Blyth Arena	Ice hockey (final)	8,500	
1964 Innsbruck	Olympiahalle	Ice hockey	10.836	
1968 Grenoble	Le Stade de Glace	Closing ceremonies, Ice hockey	12,000	
1972 Sapporo	Makomanai Ice Arena (final)	Ice hockey (final), closing ceremonies	2,700	
1972 Sapporo	Mikaho Indoor Skating Rink	None	12,000	
1976 Innsbruck	Olympiahalle	Ice hockey (final)	Not listed.	
1980 Lake Placid	Olympic Center	Ice hockey	8,500 (ice hockey); 2,000 (figure skating)	
1984 Sarajevo	Skenderija II Hall	Ice hockey	15,000	
1984 Sarajevo	Zetra Ice Hall	Closing ceremonies, Ice hockey (final)	15,000	
1988 Calgary	Olympic Saddledome (final)	Ice hockey (final)	16,605	
1988 Calgary	Stampede Corral	Ice hockey	6,475	
1992 Albertville	La halle de glace Olympique	Short track speed skating	9,000	
1994 Lillehammer	Hamar Olympic Amphitheatre	Short track speed skating	6,000	
1998 Nagano	White Ring	Short track speed skating	7,351	
2002 Salt Lake City	Salt Lake Ice Center	Short track speed skating	17,500	
2006 Turin	Palavela	Short track speed skating	8,000	
2010 Vancouver	Pacific Coliseum	Short track speed skating	14,239	
2014 Sochi	Iceberg Skating Palace	Short track speed skating	12,000	
2018 PyeongChang	Gangneung Ice Arena	Short track speed skating	12,000	
2022 Beijing	Capital Indoor Stadium	Short track speed skating	15,000	
2026 Milano Cortina	Mediolanum Forum	Short track speed skating	15,800	
2030 French Alps	Eurexpo	Short track speed skating, Curling	TBD	
2034 Utah	Maverik Center	Short track speed skating	10,100	

== Gallery of venues ==
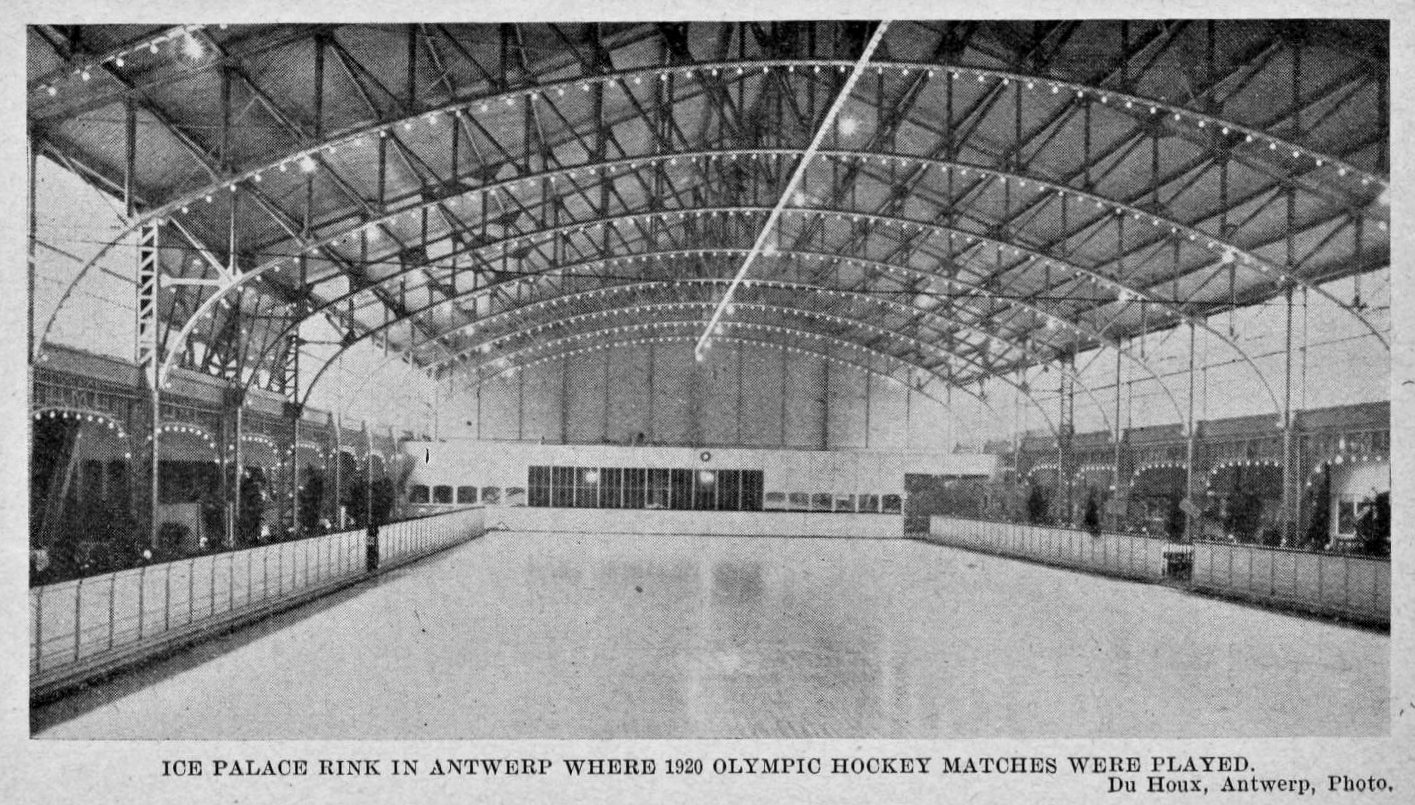
Palais de Glace d'Anvers hosted figure skating at the 1920 Summer Olympics in Antwerp.

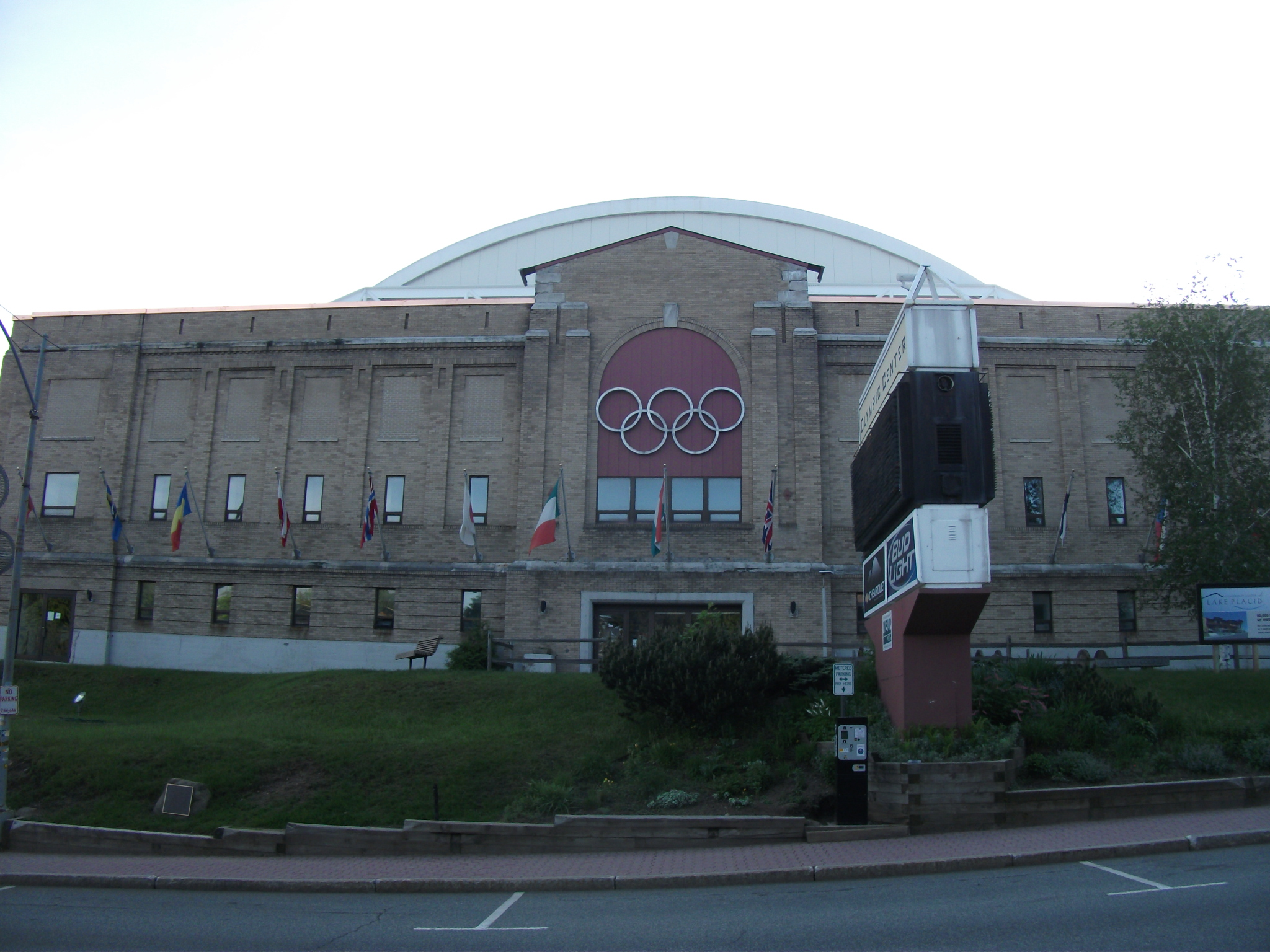
Jack Shea Arena at the Olympic Center hosted figure skating at the 1932 Winter Olympics in Lake Placid.

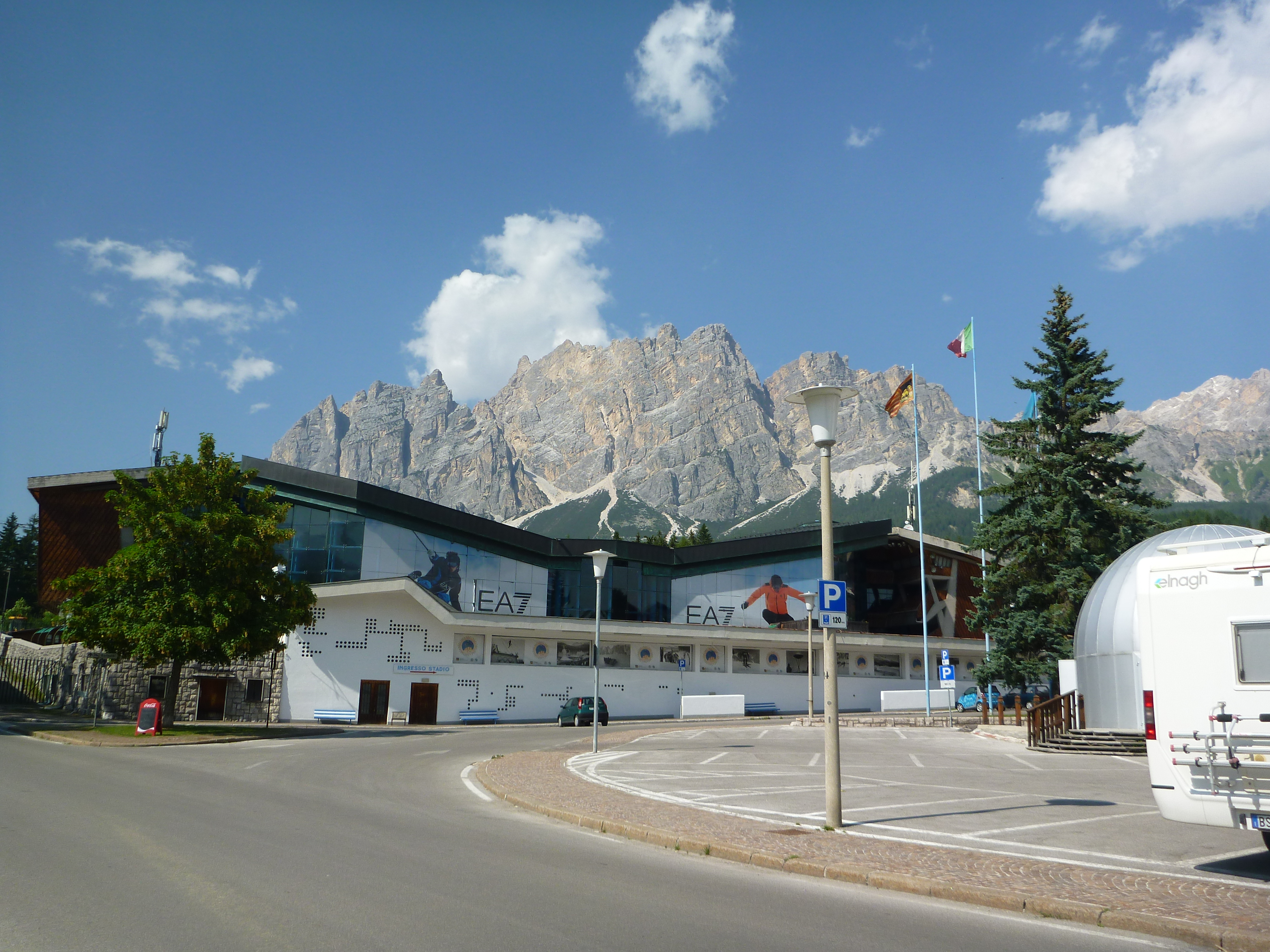
Stadio olimpico del ghiaccio hosted figure skating at the 1956 Winter Olympics in Cortina d’Ampezzo

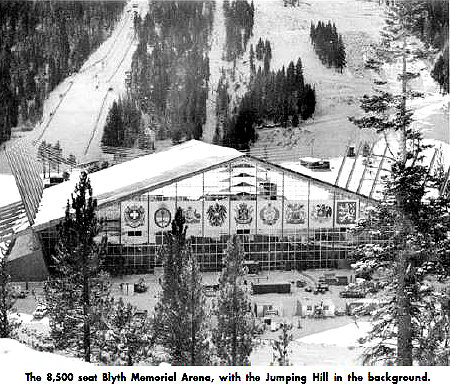
The Blyth Arena hosted figure skating at the 1960 Winter Olympics in Squaw Valley.

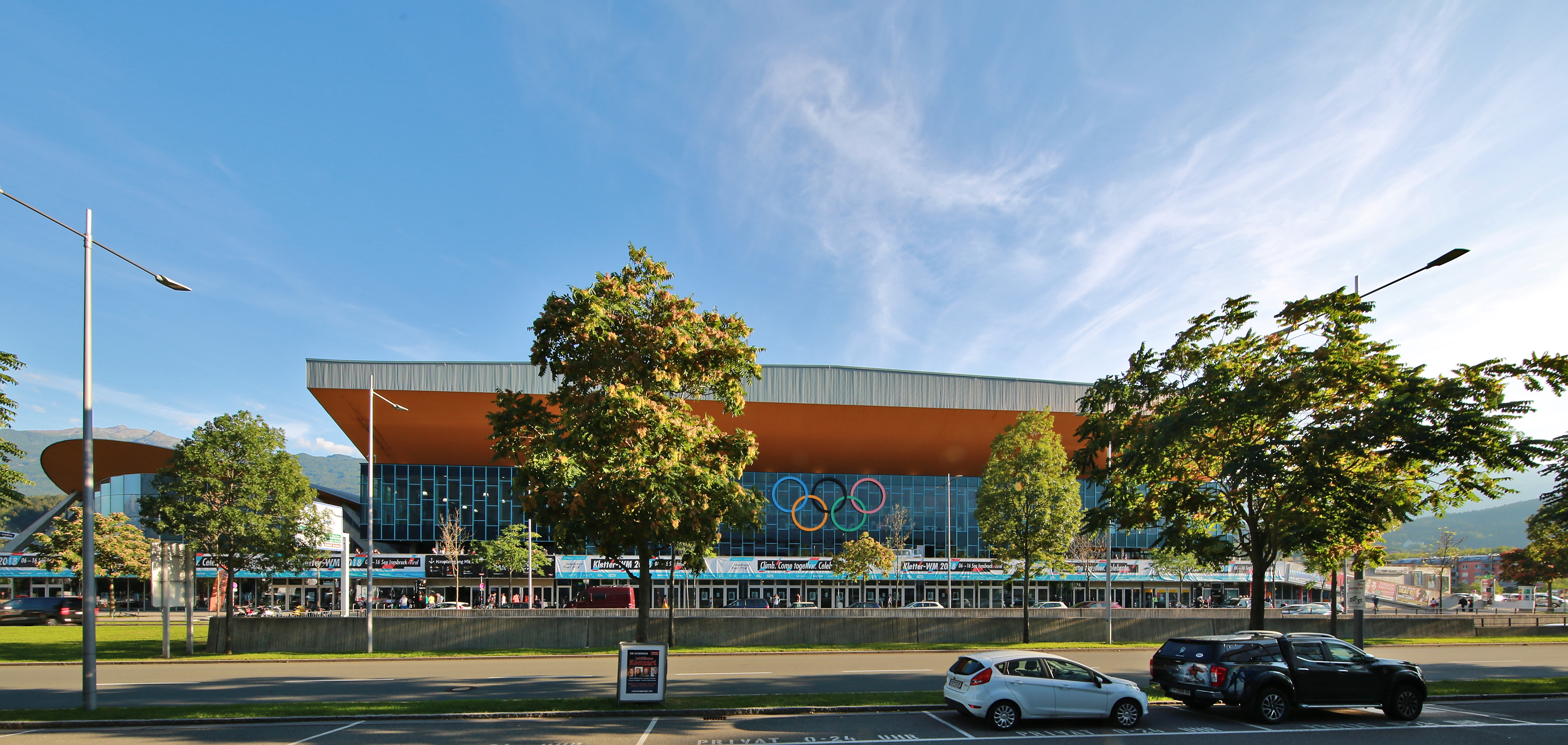
Olympiahalle hosted figure skating at the 1964 and 1976 Winter Olympics in Innsbruck.

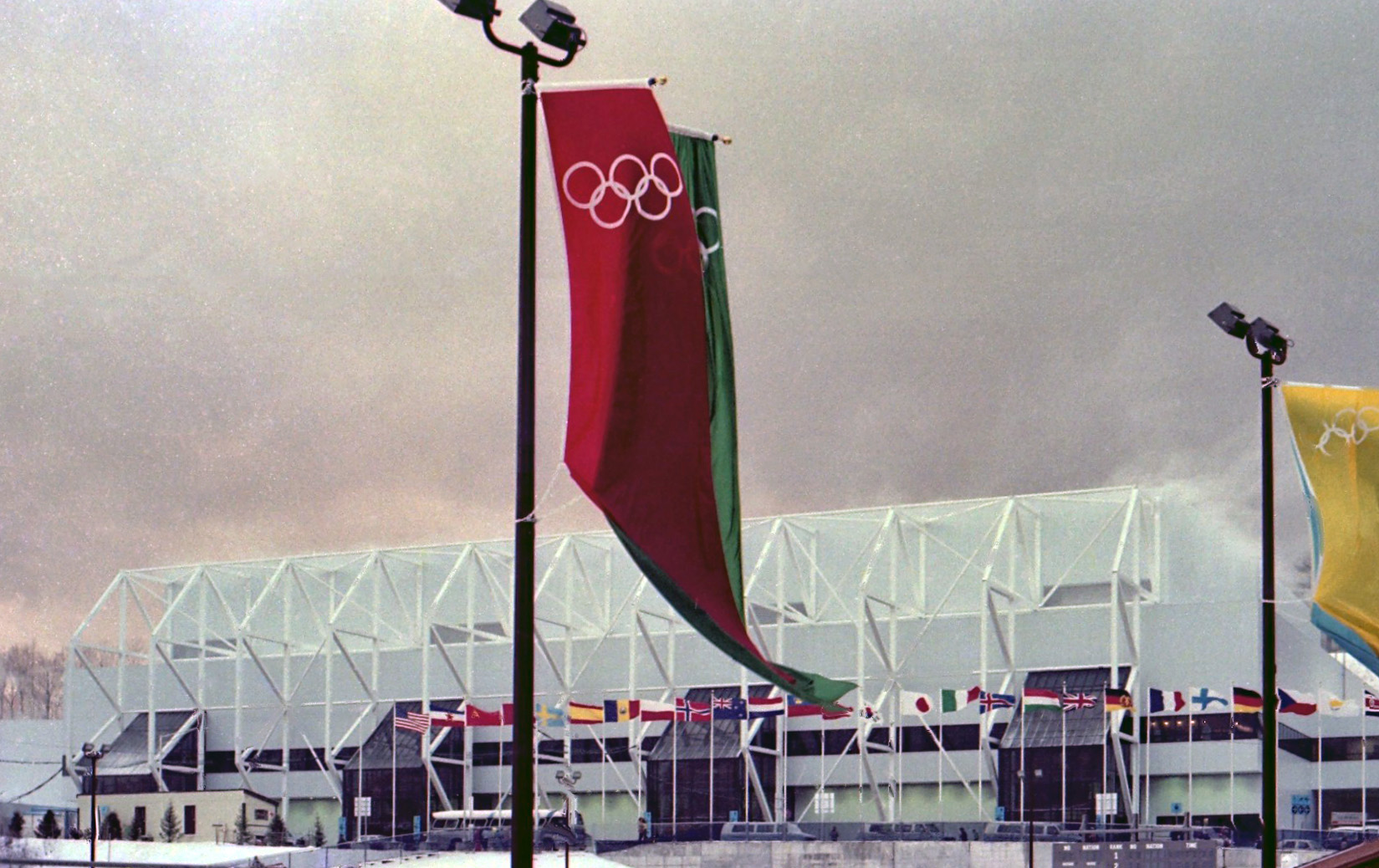
The Herb Brooks Arena at the Olympic Center hosted figure skating at the 1980 Winter Olympics in Lake Placid.

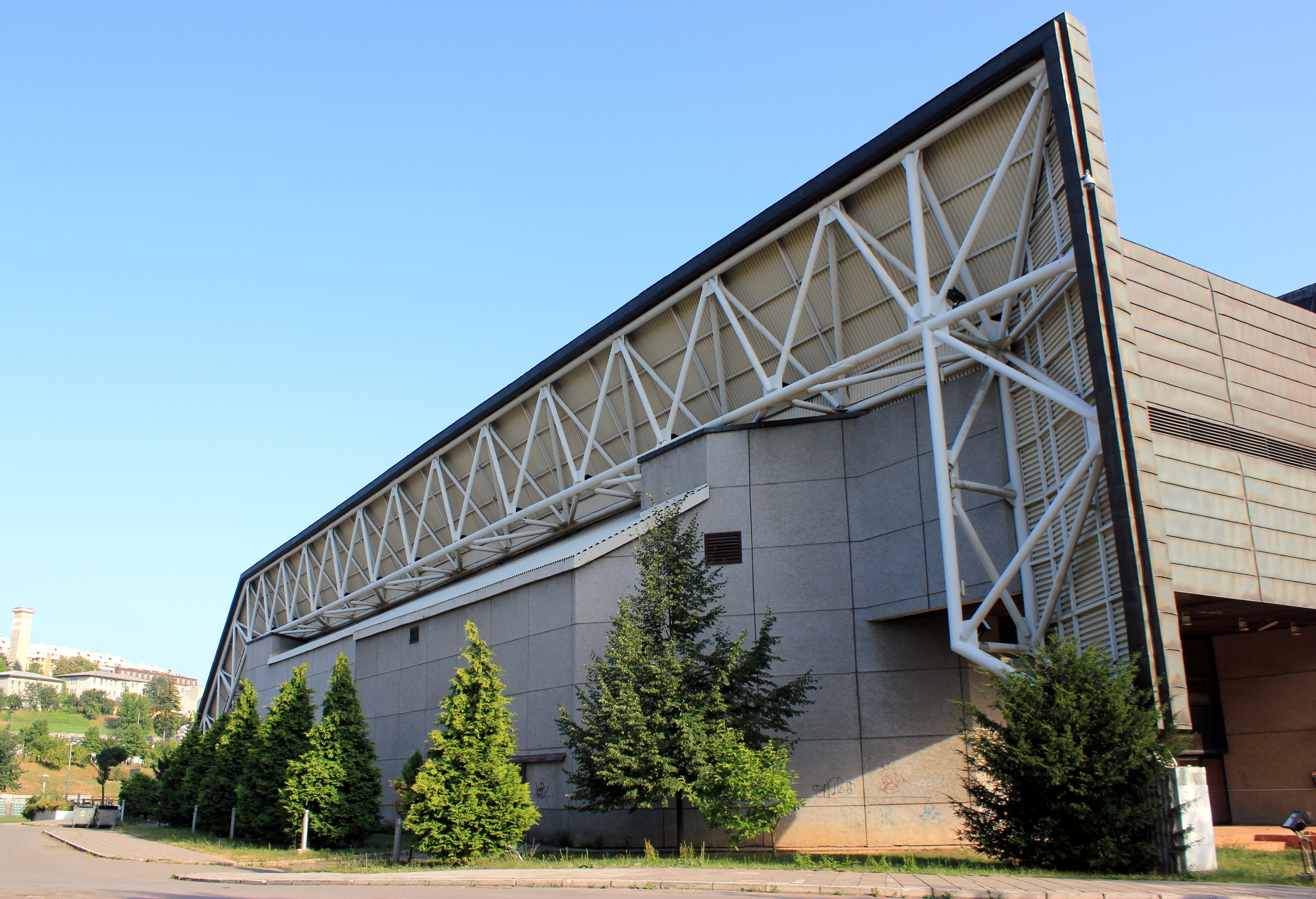
Juan Antonio Samaranch Olympic Hall hosted figure skating at the 1984 Winter Olympics in Sarajevo.

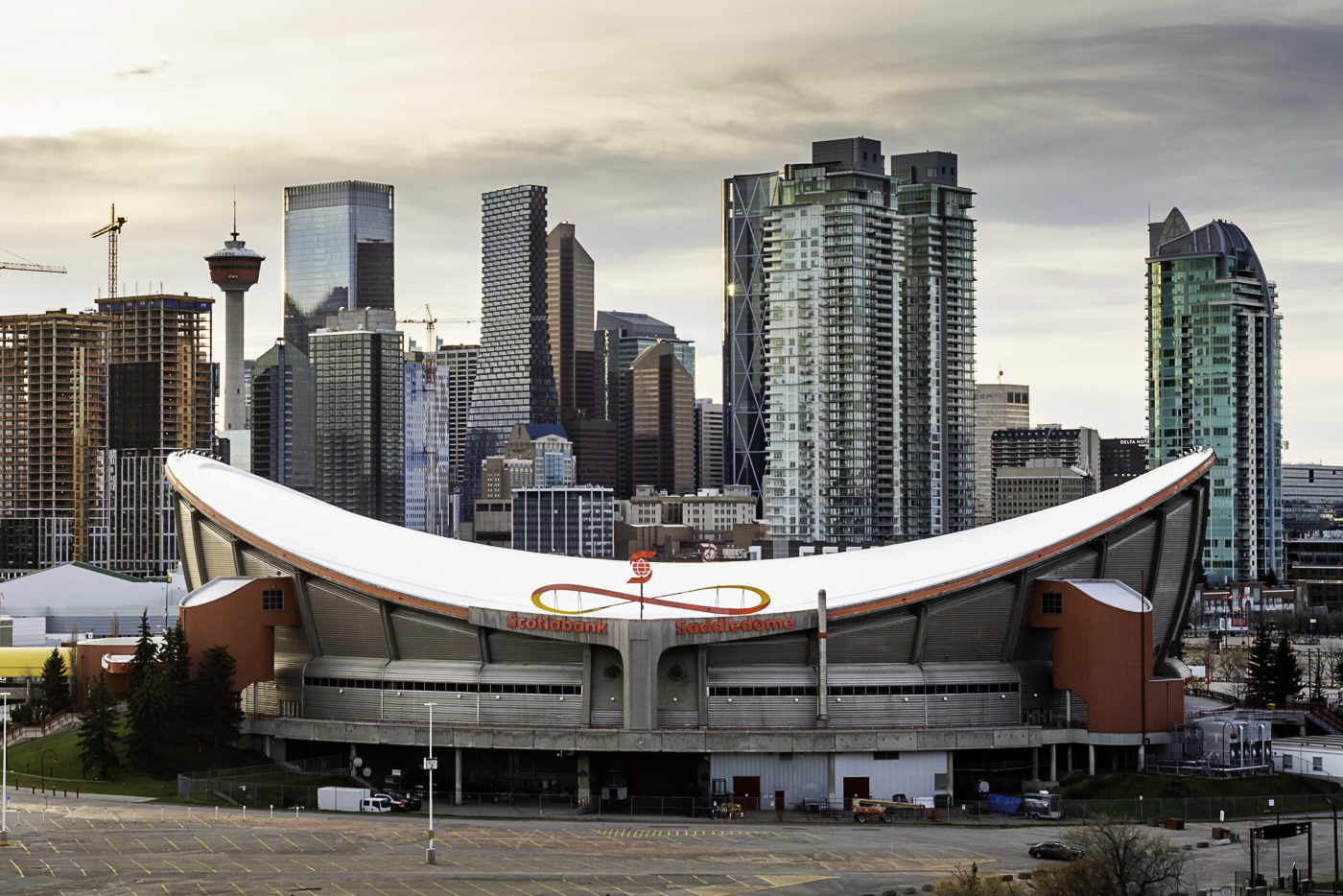
The Scotiabank Saddledome hosted figure skating at the 1988 Winter Olympics in Calgary.

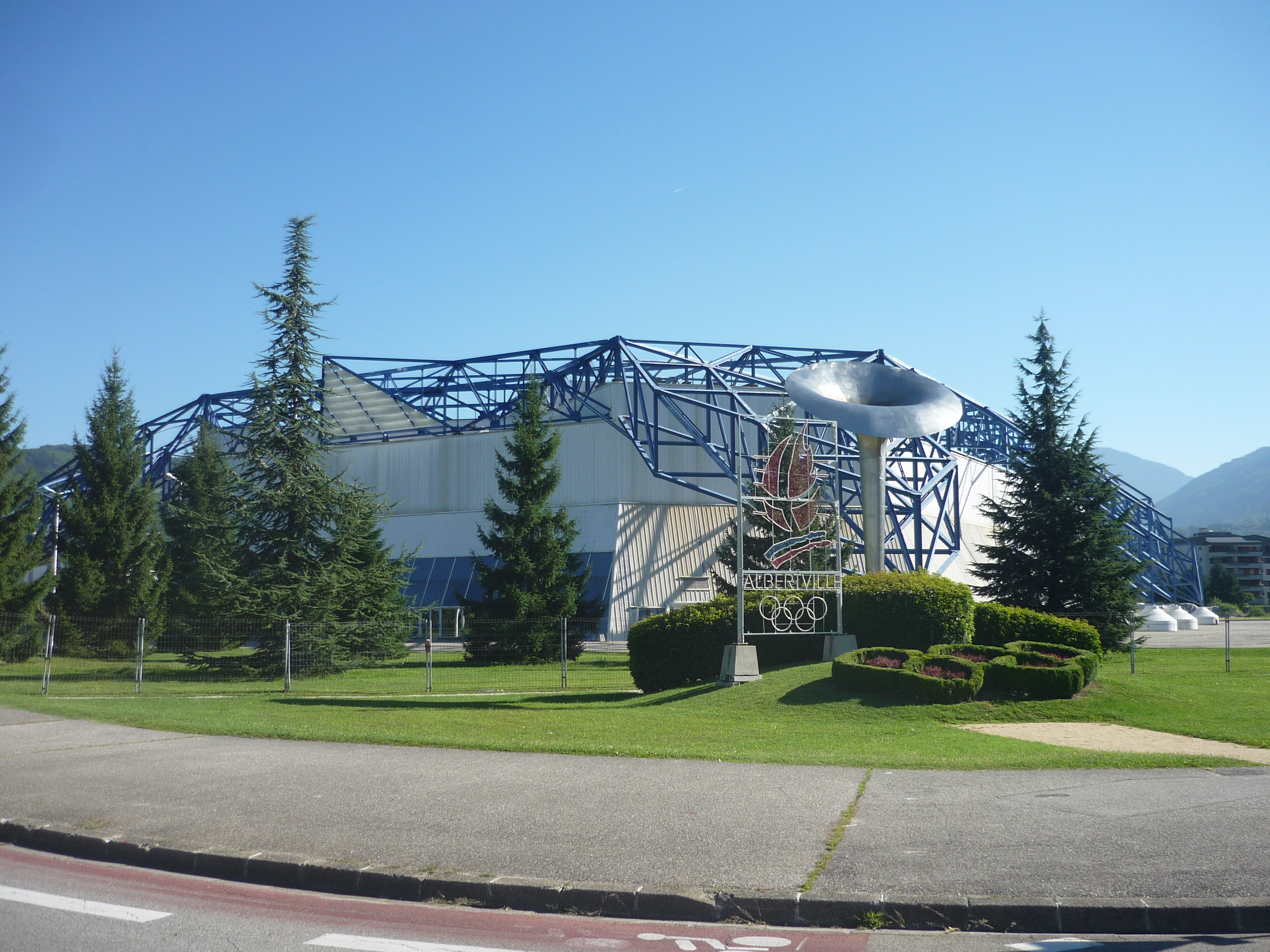
La halle de glace Olympique hosted figure skating at the 1992 Winter Olympics in Albertville.

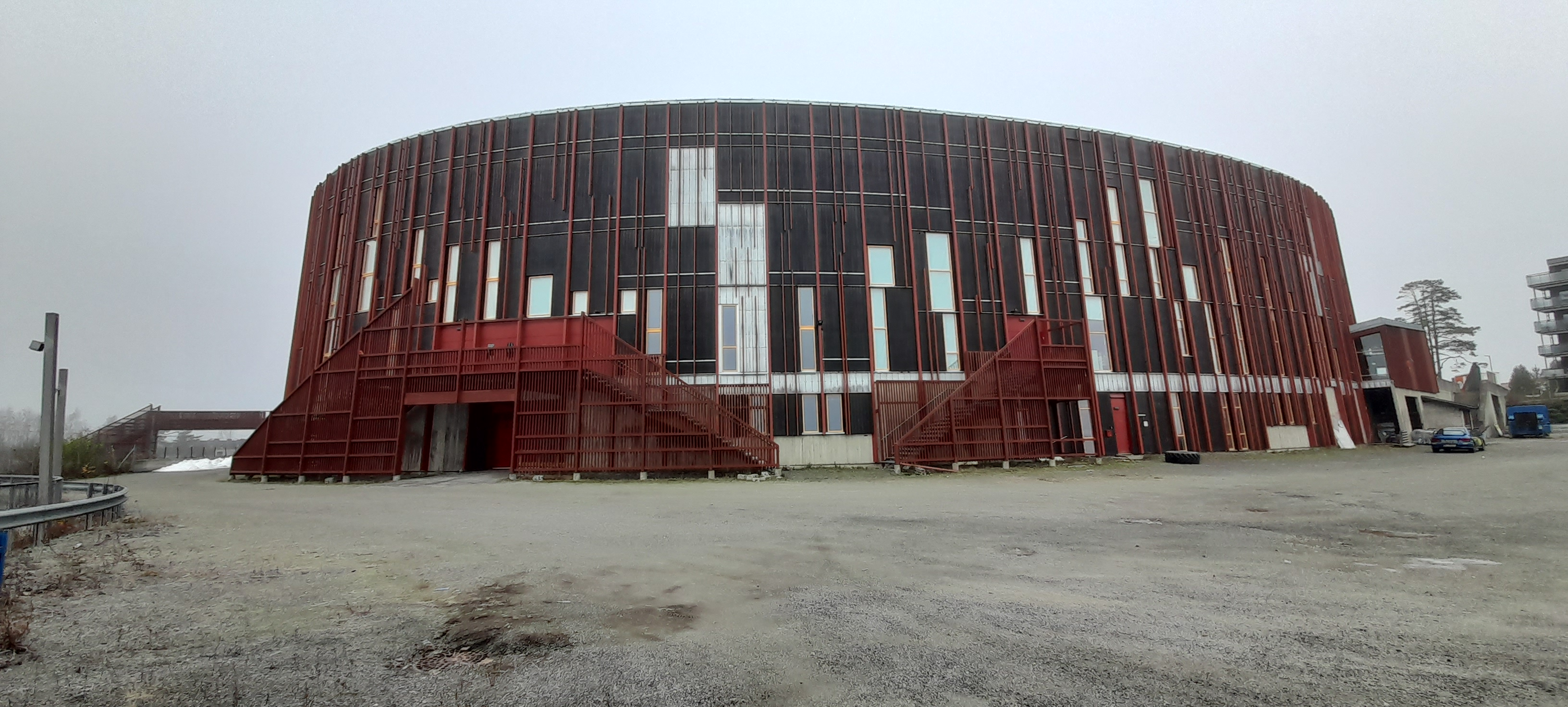
CC Amfi hosted figure skating at the 1994 Winter Olympics in Lillehammer.

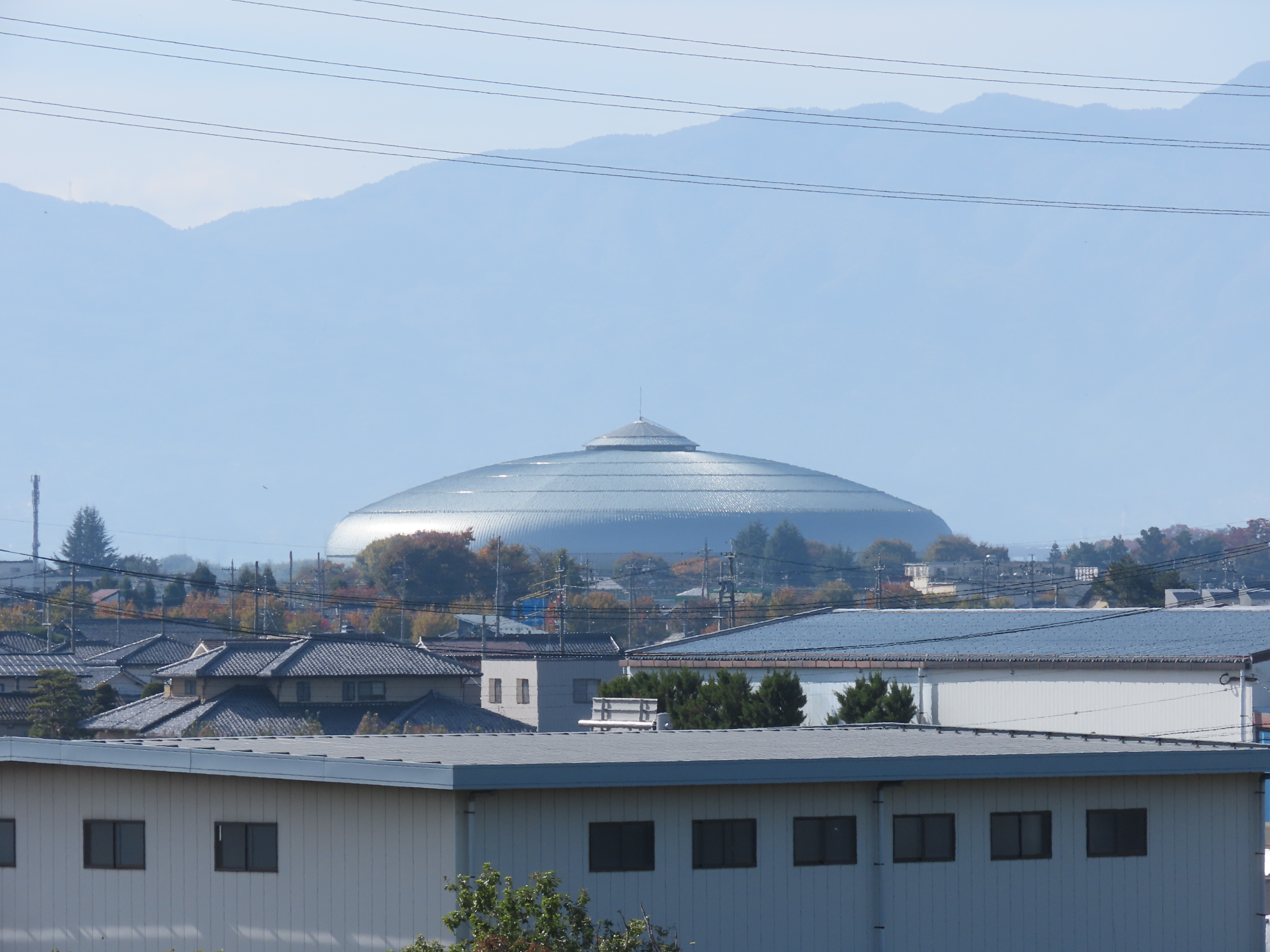
White Ring hosted figure skating at the 1998 Winter Olympics in Nagano.

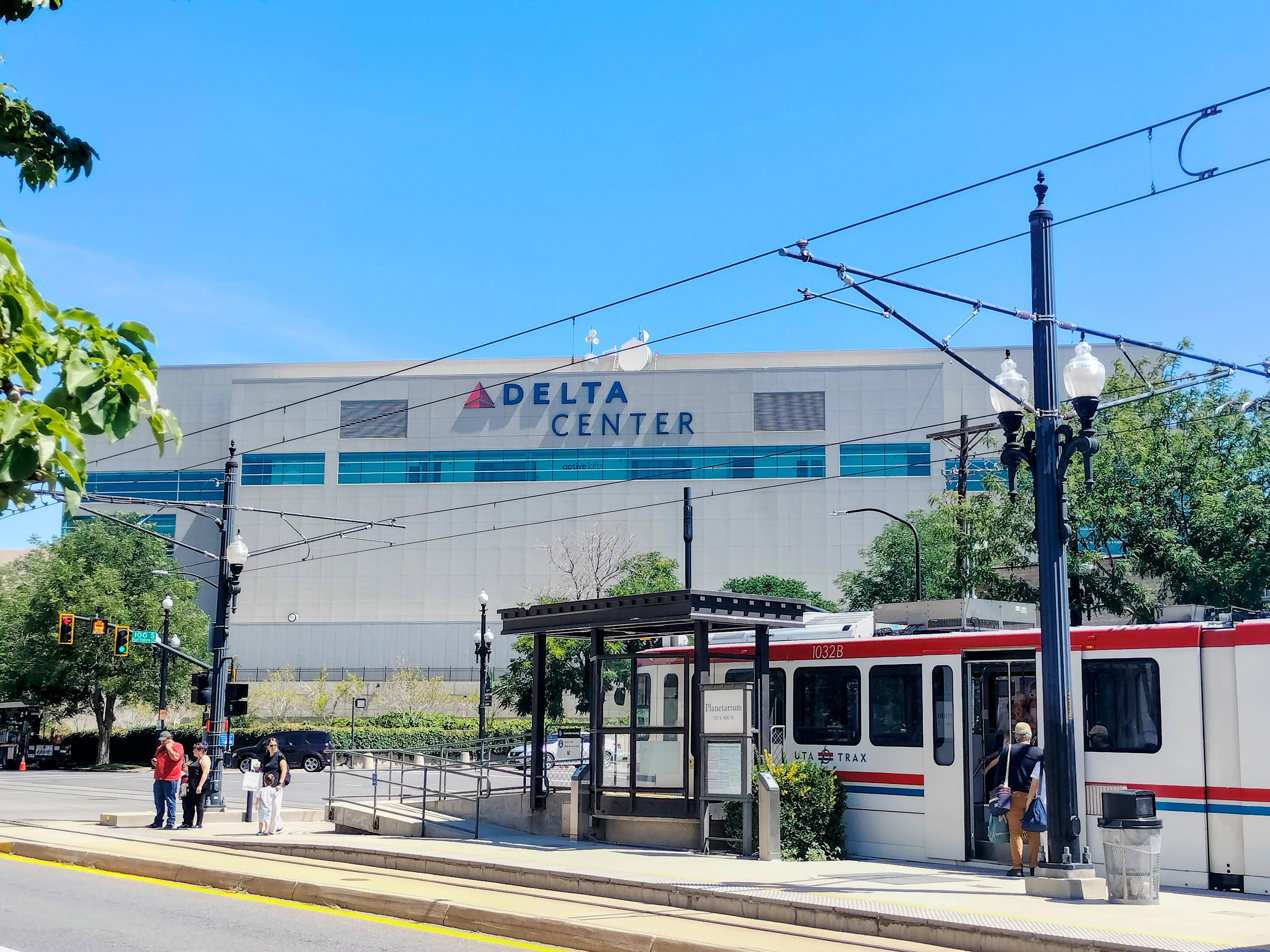
The Delta Center hosted figure skating at the 2002 Winter Olympics in Salt Lake City.

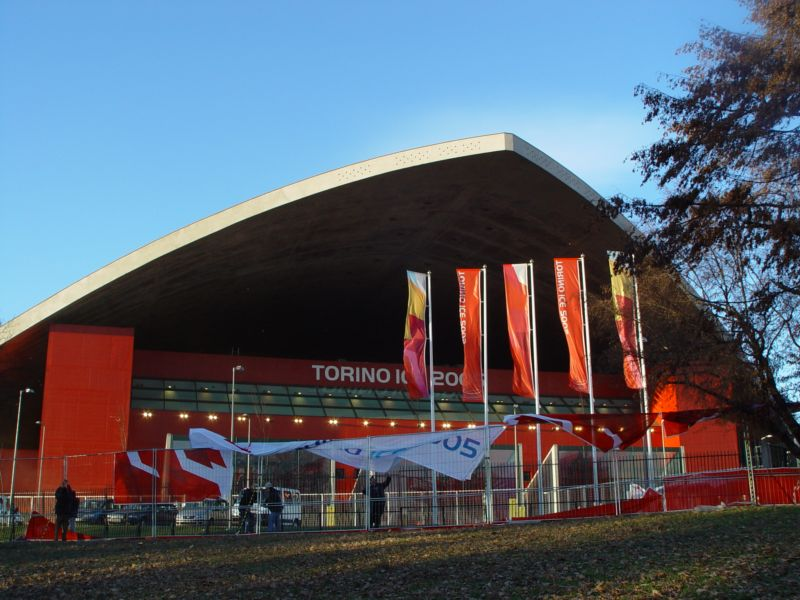
Torino Palavela hosted figure skating at the 2006 Winter Olympics in Turin.

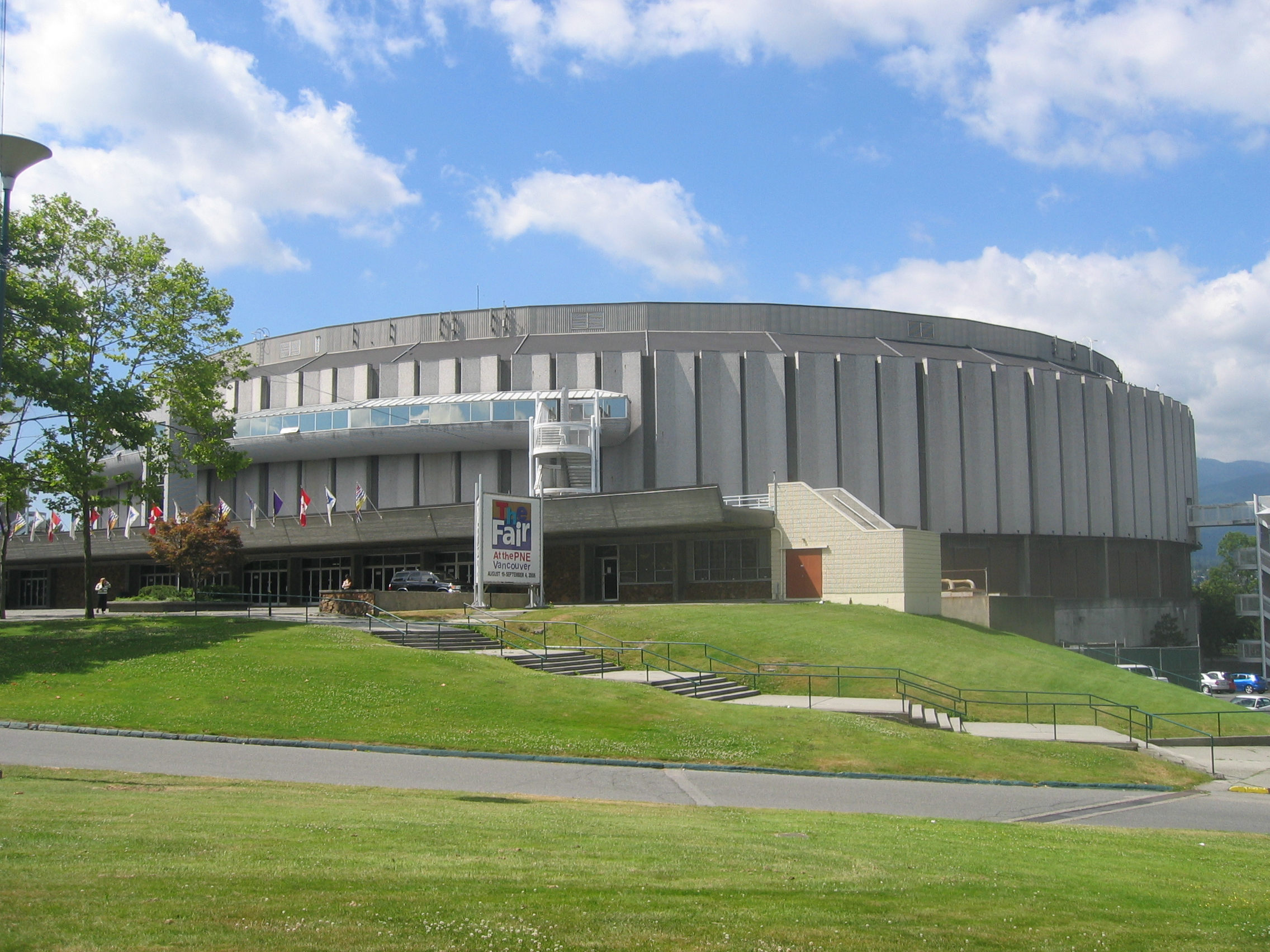
Pacific Coliseum hosted the figure skating events for the 2010 Winter Olympics in Vancouver.

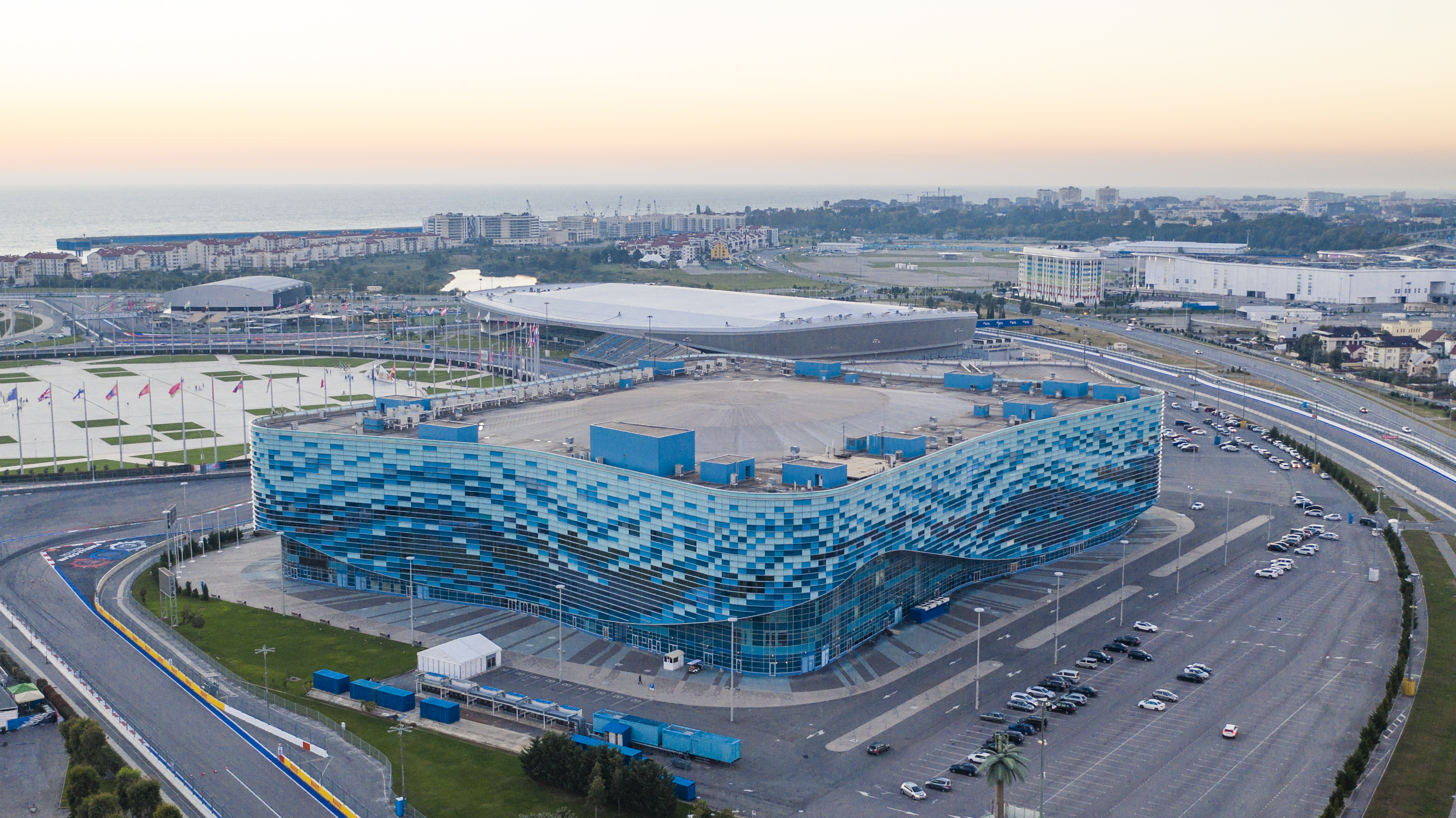
The Iceberg Skating Palace hosted figure skating at the 2014 Winter Olympics in Sochi.

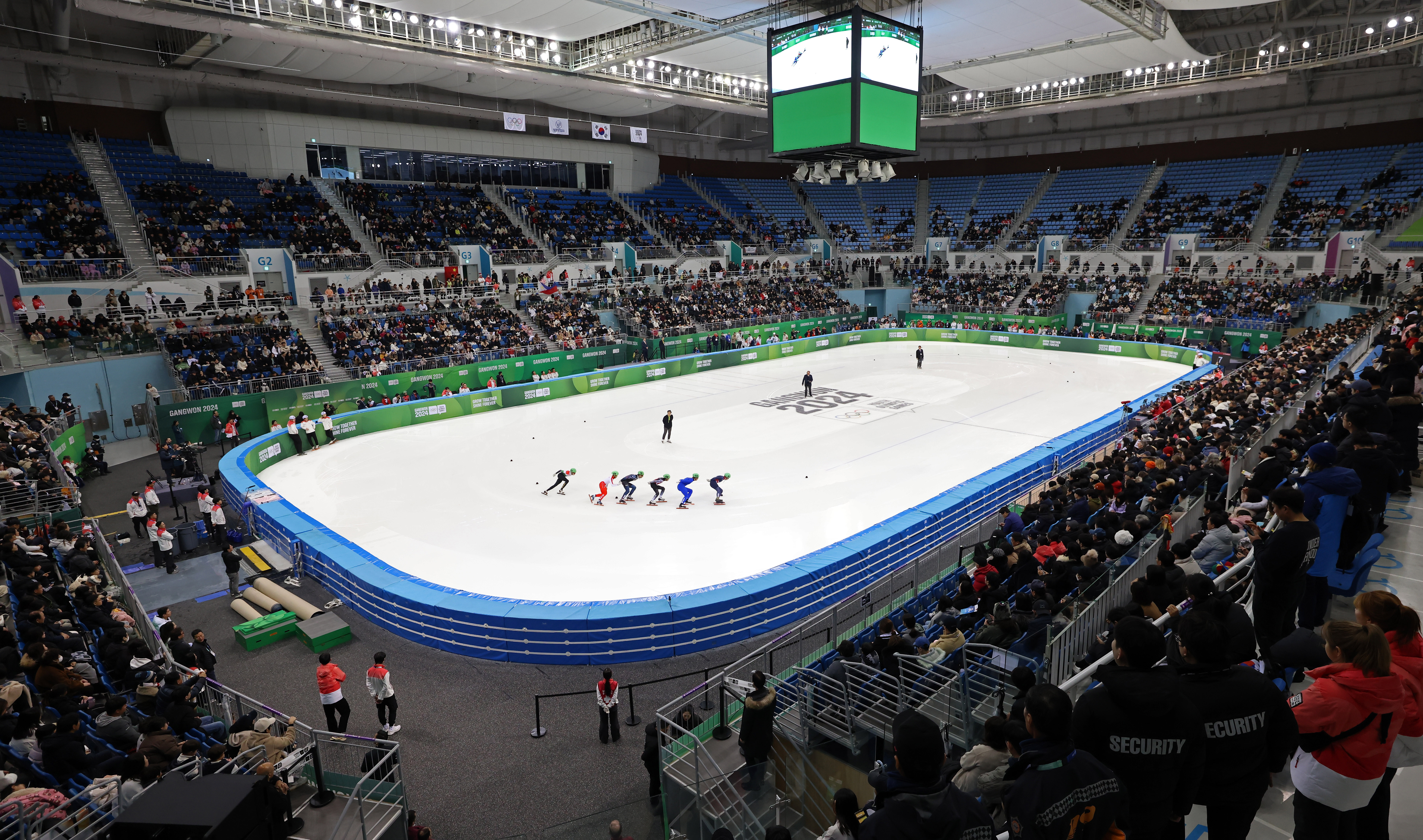
Gangneung Ice Arena hosted figure skating at the 2018 Winter Olympics in Pyeongchang.

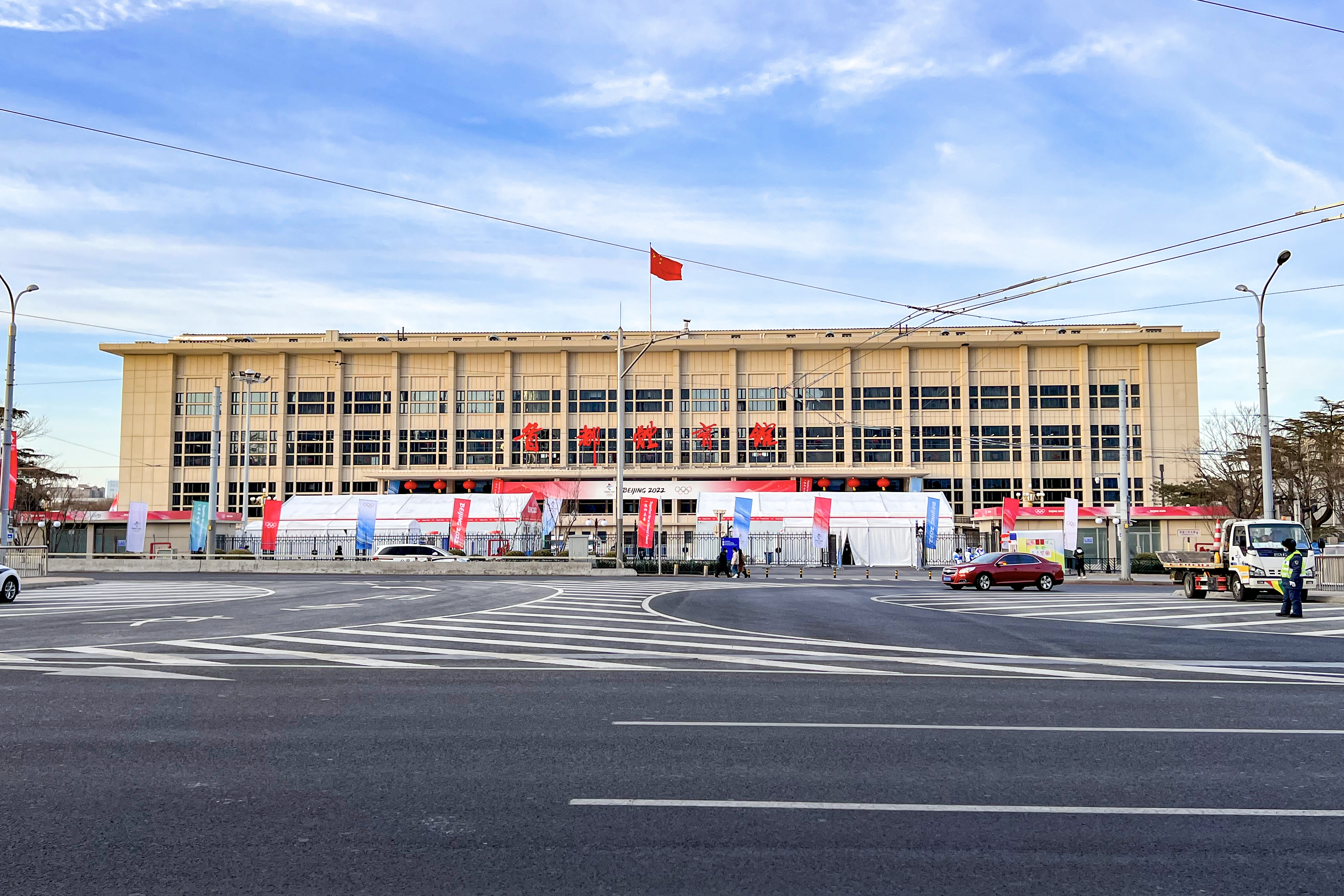
Capital Indoor Stadium hosted figure skating at the 2022 Winter Olympics in Beijing.

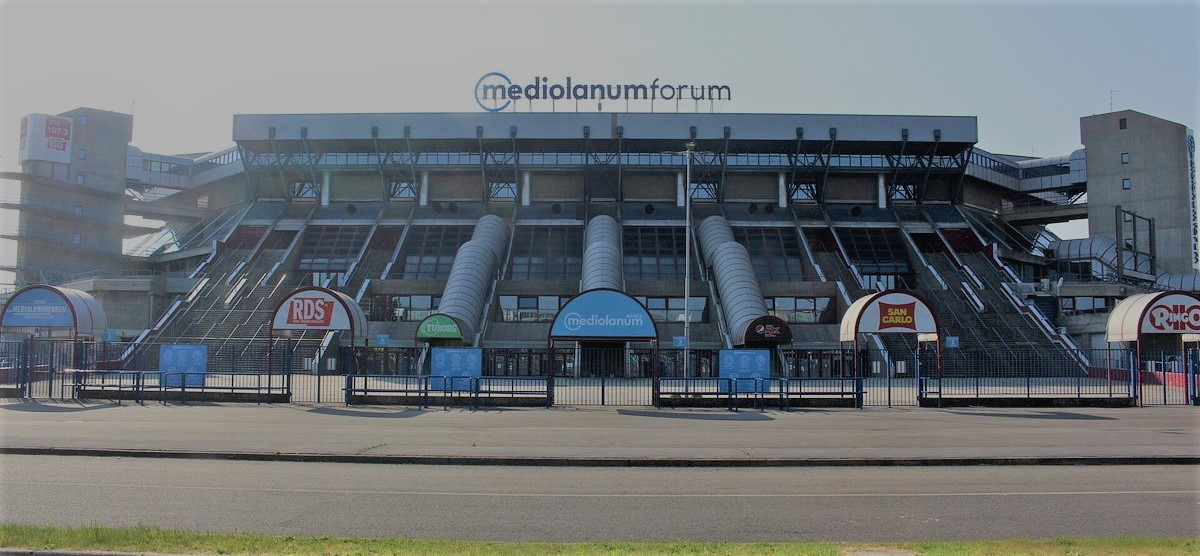
The Unipol Forum hosted figure skating at the 2026 Winter Olympics in Milan.

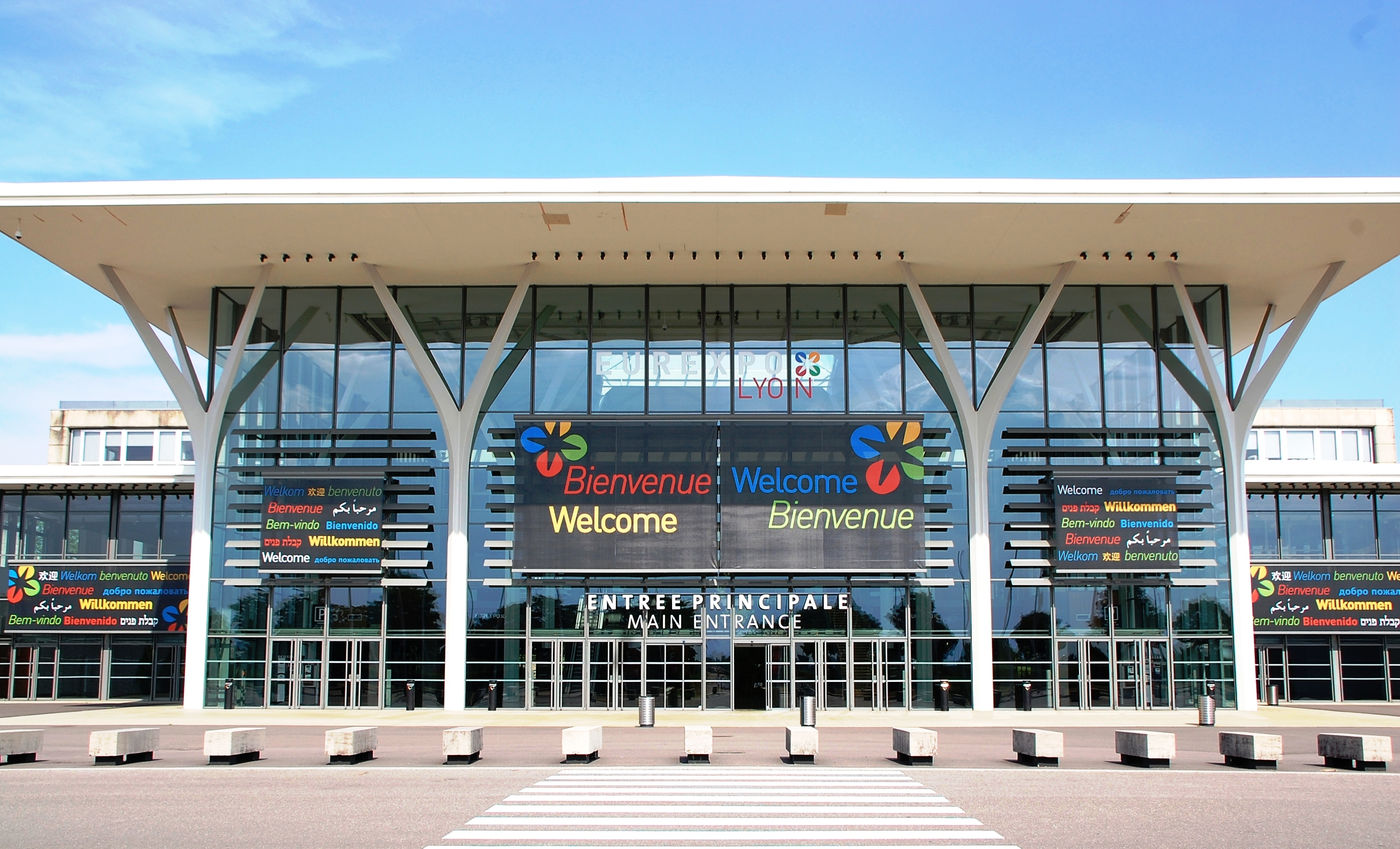
Eurexpo in Lyon will host figure skating for the 2030 Winter Olympics in the French Alps.

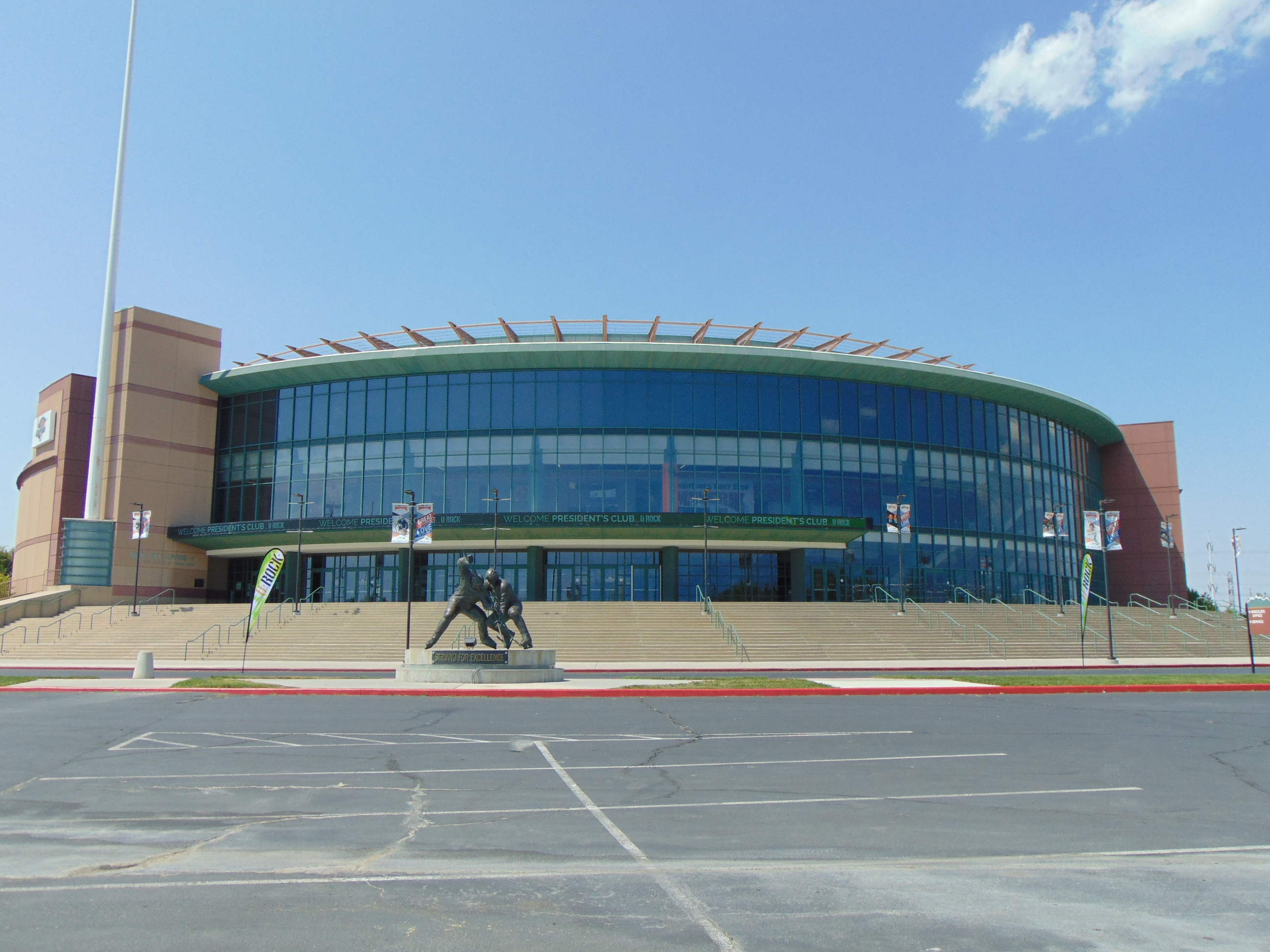
The Maverick Center will host figure skating at the 2034 Winter Olympics in Utah.
