= Eisgruber =

Eisgruber is a surname. Notable people with the surname include:

- Anton Eisgruber (1912–1994), German skier
- Christopher L. Eisgruber (born 1961), American academic and legal scholar
