= Hubert Köstinger =

Austrian Nordic combined skier

Hubert Wilhelm Köstinger
Personal information
- Nationality: Austrian
- Born: 30 April 1914
- Died: 1975 (aged 60–61)

Sport
- Sport: Nordic combined

Hubert Köstinger (30 April 1914 – 1975) was an Austrian skier. He competed in the Nordic combined event at the 1936 Winter Olympics.
