= Hans Baumann (skier) =

Hans Baumann (born 28 March 1909) was an Austrian cross-country and Nordic combined skier who competed in the 1936 Winter Olympics. He was a member of the Austrian relay team which finished eighth in the 4×10 km relay competition. In the Nordic combined event, he finished 17th place.
