= Waightman Washbond =

American soldier and bobsledder

Waightman Alan "Bud" Washbond (March 30, 1924 – August 18, 2006) was an American soldier and bobsledder. He was the son of Alan Washbond, a gold medalist in the two-man bobsleigh event at the 1936 Winter Olympics in Garmisch-Partenkirchen.

== Military career ==
A native of Keene Valley, New York, Washbond participated in World War II in the 101st Airborne Division in the 327th Glider Infantry. While in the 101st Airborne, he participated in the Siege of Bastogne during the Battle of the Bulge.

== Bobsleigh career ==
Following World War II, Washbond followed in his father's footsteps and competed in the Winter Olympics as a bobsledder. Competing in two games, he earned his best finish of fifth in the two-man event at Cortina d'Ampezzo in 1956.

== Personal life ==
Washbond was a hunter and outdoorsman who also was a fan of the New York Giants (football), New York Yankees, and the University of Connecticut basketball teams.

== Death ==
Washbond died on August 18, 2006, in Wethersfield, Connecticut. He was survived by his second wife of 27 years, one son, three stepsons, 12 grandchildren, and numerous nieces and nephews.
