= Harald Hedjerson =

Swedish Nordic combined skier

Personal information
- Full name: Harald Nils Hedjerson
- Nationality: Swedish
- Born: 1 April 1913 Stockholm, Sweden
- Died: 13 January 1966 (aged 52) Falun, Sweden

Sport
- Sport: Nordic combined, alpine skiing

Harald Nils Hedjerson (1 April 1913 – 13 January 1966) was a Swedish skier. He competed in the Nordic combined event at the 1936 Winter Olympics.

Hedjerson represented Djurgårdens IF. He won five Swedish championships in Nordic combined. He was also the first Swedish alpine skiing and slalom champion, winning the 1937 title for Djurgårdens IF.

His father was the 1910, and very first, Swedish Nordic skiing 30 kilometer champion, Adolf Hedjerson (1881–1961). His son, Hans Hedjerson, born 1943, was one of the best Swedish amateur golfers during the 1960s and early 1970s and professional golfer since 1977.
