= Markus Maier =

Austrian Nordic combined skier

Personal information
- Nationality: Austrian
- Born: 27 June 1911
- Died: 2 January 2010 (aged 98); Salzburg, Austria

Sport
- Sport: Nordic combined

Markus Maier (27 June 1911 – 2 January 2010) was an Austrian skier. He competed in the Nordic combined event at the 1936 Winter Olympics.
