= Berger Torrissen =

American Nordic combined skier (1901–1991)

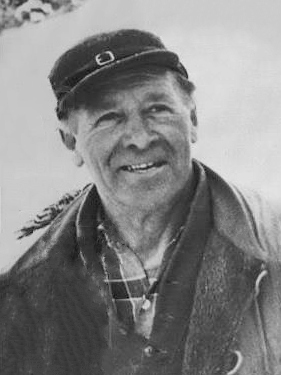
- Torrissen in 1960

Personal information
- Born: September 16, 1901 Sørreisa, Norway
- Died: February 28, 1991 (aged 89) Salisbury, Connecticut, U.S.
- Height: 171 cm (5 ft 7 in)
- Weight: 69 kg (152 lb)

Sport
- Country: United States
- Sport: Skiing
- Club: Norfolk Winter Sports Club

Berger Torrissen or Birger Tørrissen (September 16, 1901 – February 28, 1991) was an American skier.

He was born in Sørreisa Municipality, Norway, and later immigrated to the United States. He competed for the United States in Nordic combined and cross-country skiing at the 1936 Winter Olympics with the best result of 11th place in the 4 × 10 km relay. Torrissen coached the US cross-country team at the 1950 World Championships and oversaw the biathlon competition and ski-jumping hill at the 1960 Winter Olympics. He was a brother-in-law of Karl Magnus Satre and Paul Ottar Satre.
