= Niilo Nikunen =

Finnish Nordic combined skier

Personal information
- Nationality: Finnish
- Born: 14 June 1913; Lemi, Finland
- Died: 19 July 1991 (aged 78); Nojanmaa, Finland

Sport
- Sport: Nordic combined

Niilo Nikunen (14 June 1913 – 19 July 1991) was a Finnish skier. He competed in the Nordic combined event at the 1936 Winter Olympics.
