= Oswald Julen =

Swiss Nordic combined skier

Personal information
- Nationality: Swiss
- Born: 15 February 1912; Zermatt, Switzerland
- Died: December 1998; Zermatt, Switzerland

Sport
- Sport: Nordic combined

Oswald Julen (15 February 1912 – December 1998) was a Swiss skier. He competed in the Nordic combined event at the 1936 Winter Olympics.
