= Leon Bebler =

Slovenian Nordic combined skier

Personal information
- Nationality: Slovenian
- Born: 4 February 1912; Ljubljana, Austria-Hungary
- Died: 9 August 1976 (aged 64)

Sport
- Sport: Nordic combined

Leon Bebler (4 February 1912 – 9 August 1976) was a Slovenian skier. He competed in the Nordic combined event at the 1936 Winter Olympics.
