= Holger Lundgren =

Swedish Nordic combined skier (1912–1966)

Personal information
- Nationality: Swedish
- Born: 31 March 1912 Örnsköldsvik, Sweden
- Died: 12 May 1966 (aged 54) Örnsköldsvik, Sweden

Sport
- Sport: Nordic combined

Holger Lundgren (31 March 1912 – 12 May 1966) was a Swedish skier. He competed in the Nordic combined event at the 1936 Winter Olympics.
