= Pertti Mattila (skier) =

Finnish Nordic combined skier

Personal information
- Nationality: Finnish
- Born: 25 April 1909; Orimattila, Finland
- Died: 9 December 1998 (aged 89); Hollola, Finland

Sport
- Sport: Nordic combined

Pertti Mattila (25 April 1909 – 9 December 1998) was a Finnish skier. He competed in the Nordic combined event at the 1936 Winter Olympics.
