= Josef Gumpold =

German Nordic combined skier

Personal information
- Nationality: German
- Born: 3 September 1908; Bad Gastein, Austria-Hungary
- Died: 5 December 1942 (aged 34); Soviet Union

Sport
- Sport: Nordic combined

Josef Gumpold (3 September 1908 – 5 December 1942) was a German skier. He competed in the Nordic combined event at the 1936 Winter Olympics. He was killed in action during World War II.
