= Fidel Wagner =

German Nordic combined skier

Personal information
- Nationality: German
- Born: 17 March 1912; Oberstaufen, German Empire
- Died: 14 February 1945 (aged 32); Graudenz, Reichsgau Danzig-West Prussia, Nazi Germany

Sport
- Sport: Nordic combined

Fidel Wagner (17 March 1912 – 14 February 1945) was a German skier. He competed in the Nordic combined event at the 1936 Winter Olympics. He was killed in action during World War II.
