= Ernst Berger =

Swiss Nordic combined skier

Personal information
- Nationality: Swiss
- Born: 15 February 1913
- Died: February 1986 (aged 72–73)

Sport
- Sport: Nordic combined

Ernst Berger (15 February 1913 – February 1986) was a Swiss skier. He competed in the Nordic combined event at the 1936 Winter Olympics.
