= Jonas Westman =

Swedish Nordic combined skier (1909–1983)

Personal information
- Full name: Jonas Augustin Westman
- Nationality: Swedish
- Born: 28 August 1909 Luleå, Sweden
- Died: 20 June 1983 (aged 73) Luleå, Sweden

Sport
- Sport: Nordic combined

Jonas Augustin Westman (28 August 1909 – 20 June 1983) was a Swedish skier. He competed in the Nordic combined event at the 1936 Winter Olympics.

Westman attended university in England at Balliol College, Oxford.
