= Rado Istenič =

Slovenian Nordic combined skier

Personal information
- Nationality: Slovenian
- Born: 18 August 1915; Ljubljana, Austria-Hungary
- Died: 27 January 1951 (aged 35)

Sport
- Sport: Nordic combined

Rado Istenič (18 August 1915 – 27 January 1951) was a Slovenian skier. He competed in the Nordic combined event at the 1936 Winter Olympics.
