= Fred Kammer =

American ice hockey player and golfer (1912–1996)

Personal information
- Full name: August Frederick Kammer Jr.
- Nationality: United States
- Born: June 3, 1912 Montclair, New Jersey
- Died: February 21, 1996 (aged 83) Hobe Sound, Florida

Career
- Sport: Golf
- College: Princeton
- Status: Amateur

Best results in major championships
- Masters Tournament: T51: 1948
- PGA Championship: DNP
- U.S. Open: T53: 1946
- The Open Championship: DNP
Medal record
Men's ice hockey
Representing the United States
Olympic Games
Bronze medal – third place	1936 Garmisch-Partenkirchen	Team

August Frederick Kammer Jr. (June 3, 1912 – February 21, 1996) was an American ice hockey player and amateur golfer.

== Ice Hockey ==
In 1936 he was a member of the American ice hockey team, which won the bronze medal in the 1936 Winter Olympics.

== Golf ==
Kammer was a noted amateur golfer. He played in the 1947 Walker Cup.

== Personal life ==
Kammer was born in Montclair, New Jersey and died in Hobe Sound, Florida.
