= Andrzej Marusarz =

Polish ski jumper

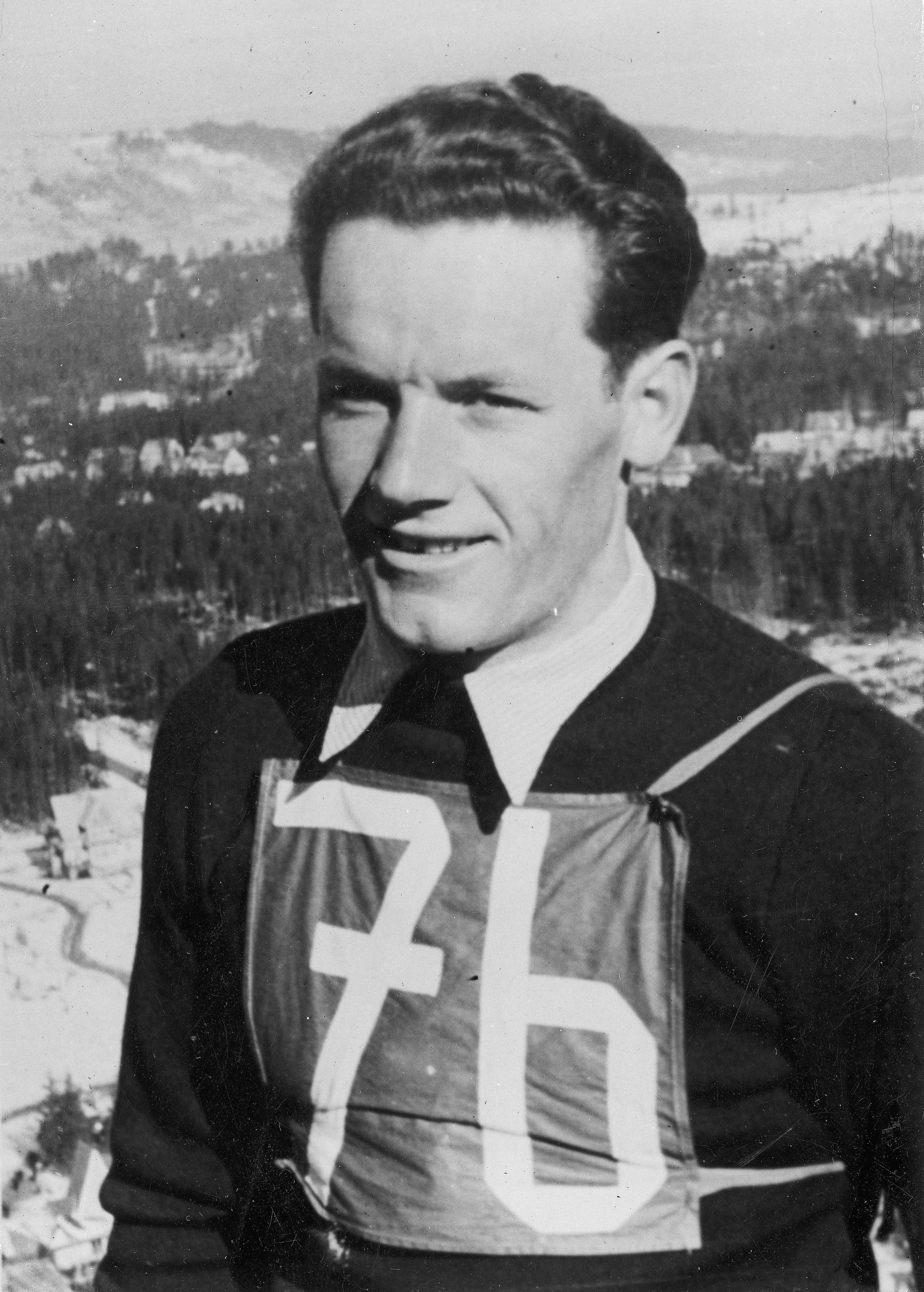
- Marusarz in 1939

Personal information
- Nationality: Polish
- Born: 3 August 1913; Zakopane, Poland
- Died: 5 October 1968 (aged 55); Zakopane, Poland
- Height: 168 cm (5 ft 6 in)

Sport
- Sport: Ski jumping, Nordic combined

Andrzej Marusarz (3 August 1913 – 5 October 1968) was a Polish ski jumper and Nordic combined skier. He competed in both events at the 1932 Winter Olympics and the 1936 Summer Olympics.
