= Paul Rowe (ice hockey) =

American ice hockey player (1914–1993)

Personal information
- Born: Paul Edward Rowe; May 5, 1914 Somerville, Massachusetts, U.S.
- Died: August 28, 1993 (aged 79) Drexel Hill, Pennsylvania, U.S.

Sport
- Sport: Ice hockey
- Position: Right wing
Medal record
Men's Ice hockey
Bronze medal – third place	1936 Garmisch-Partenkirchen	Team

Paul Edward Rowe (May 5, 1914 – August 28, 1993) was an American ice hockey player who competed in the 1936 Winter Olympics.

== Early life ==
Rowe was born in Somerville, Massachusetts, and raised in Arlington. He played on the Boston University Terriers men's ice hockey team for four years and served as co-captain of the team during his senior year. Rowe was also a member and captain of the Boston University golf team.

== Career ==
In 1936, he was a member of the American ice hockey team, which won the bronze medal. Rowe returned to Boston and played for the Boston Olympics. After retiring from hockey, Rowe worked as an executive in the insurance and advertising industries.

== Personal life ==
He died in Drexel Hill, Pennsylvania.
