= Willy Bernath =

Swiss cross-country skier (1914–1991)

Personal information
- Nationality: Swiss
- Born: 1 March 1914; La Chaux-de-Fonds, Switzerland
- Died: 13 June 1991 (aged 77)

Sport
- Sport: Cross-country skiing

Willy Bernath (1 March 1914 – 13 June 1991) was a Swiss cross-country skier. He competed in the men's 18 kilometre event at the 1936 Winter Olympics.
