= Frank Shaughnessy Jr. =

Canadian/American athlete

Medal record

Men's ice hockey

Representing the United States

Olympic Games
Bronze medal – third place	1936 Garmisch-Partenkirchen	Team

Francis John Shaughnessy Jr. (June 21, 1911 – June 12, 1982) was a Canadian/American athlete. In ice hockey, he was a member of the American team which won the bronze medal in the 1936 Winter Olympics. He was the son of Frank Shaughnessy, also an athlete and sports official.

== Sporting career ==
He was born in Roanoke, Virginia and raised in Montreal, Quebec. In Montreal, Shaughnessy was an all-star halfback for the McGill Redmen football team and was also a player on the ice hockey team. Shaughnessy held dual American and Canadian citizenship and he joined the American team for the 1936 Olympics.

Shaughnessy was active in the Canadian Olympic Association, serving as chef de mission at five Olympic Winter Games and was vice president of the COA from 1957 through 1975. Shaughnessy later was one of the organizers of the 1976 Summer Olympics in Montreal. Shaughnessy was also an administrator in the Canadian Ski Association and the Canadian and Quebec Golf Associations. Shaughnessy died in 1982 in Montreal.
