= Richard Parsons (skier) =

American cross-country skier (1910–1999)

Personal information
- Nationality: American
- Born: June 20, 1910 Salisbury, Connecticut, United States
- Died: March 12, 1999 (aged 88) Salisbury, Connecticut, United States

Sport
- Sport: Cross-country skiing

Richard Parsons (June 20, 1910 – March 12, 1999) was an American cross-country skier. He competed at the 1932 Winter Olympics and the 1936 Winter Olympics.
