= Thomas Moone =

American ice hockey player (1908–1986)

Olympic medal record

Men's Ice hockey
Bronze medal – third place	1936 Garmisch-Partenkirchen	Team

Thomas Henry Moone Sr. (November 6, 1908 – July 25, 1986) was an American ice hockey player who competed in the 1936 Winter Olympics.

In 1936 he was a member of the American ice hockey team, which won the bronze medal. He also played for the Boston Bruins old timers even though he was never a member of the Boston Bruins.

He was born in Ottawa, Ontario and died in Lexington, Massachusetts.
