= Olympia-Kunsteisstadion =

Skating stadium in Garmisch-Partenkirchen, Germany

- Interactive map of Olympia-Kunsteisstadion
- Location: Garmisch-Partenkirchen, Germany
- Coordinates: 47°29′20″N 11°5′44″E

Construction
- Built: 106 days
- Opened: December 16, 1934

The Olympia-Kunsteisstadion is a skating stadium located in Garmisch-Partenkirchen.

It was built according to plans of architect Hanns Ostler in only 106 days for the figure skating and ice hockey at the 1936 Winter Olympics. It was opened on 16 December 1934. It contained an ice rink 30 meters by 60 meters for these games. It was a partially covered stadium. The stadium was able to hold 10,000 people.

The Olympia-Kunsteistadion was rebuilt in 1939/1940 for the planned 1940 Winter Olympics which were canceled due to World War II.

After the war it was reopened in 1948. the stadium received a complete roof in 1964. From 1990 to 1994 it was rebuilt again and is now the Olympic-Eissport-Zentrum of Garmisch-Partenkirchen.
