= Philip LaBatte =

American ice hockey player

Olympic medal record

Men's Ice hockey
Bronze medal – third place	1936 Garmisch-Partenkirchen	Team

Philip William LaBatte (July 5, 1911 – September 6, 2002) was an American ice hockey player who played at the University of Minnesota and won a Bronze Medal in the 1936 Winter Olympics.

Phil LaBatte was born and raised in Minneapolis, Minnesota. He was an all-around athlete at West High School, competing in baseball, football, and ice hockey. At the collegiate level, he excelled at ice hockey at the University of Minnesota, guiding the Gophers to three consecutive Conference Championships from 1933 - 1935. He was named team Captain during the 1934-35 season and was the only Gopher to play in all 53 games during those three seasons while compiling a 45-8 won/loss record (85%). He is often considered to be the first of the great college hockey players to come out of the University of Minnesota.

Upon completion of his collegiate career, Mr. LaBatte played amateur hockey primarily with the Baltimore Orioles of the Eastern Amateur League. In 1936, he was the first ice hockey player from the University of Minnesota to be selected to compete in a Winter Olympics. He was also the first Native American ice hockey player out of the University of Minnesota to compete in an Olympic Games. The 1936 Olympic Games were held in Garmisch-Partenkirchen, Germany. A defenseman, his two assists in a 2-0 win over Czechoslovakia allowed the U.S. Team to advance to the semi-finals. The U.S. Team ultimately won the Bronze Medal.

After his competitive hockey career, Mr. LaBatte relocated to the Washington, D.C. area, where he officiated ice hockey games for the Eastern and American Hockey Leagues. Mr. LaBatte was inducted into the State of Minnesota Olympic Hall of Fame, located in Blaine, Minnesota, by Governor Rudy Perpich on July 7, 1990.

Philip LaBatte, an enrolled member of the Sisseton-Wahpeton Sioux Tribe, died in Alexandria, Virginia, on September 6, 2002.
