= Bernt Østerkløft =

Norwegian Nordic combined skier

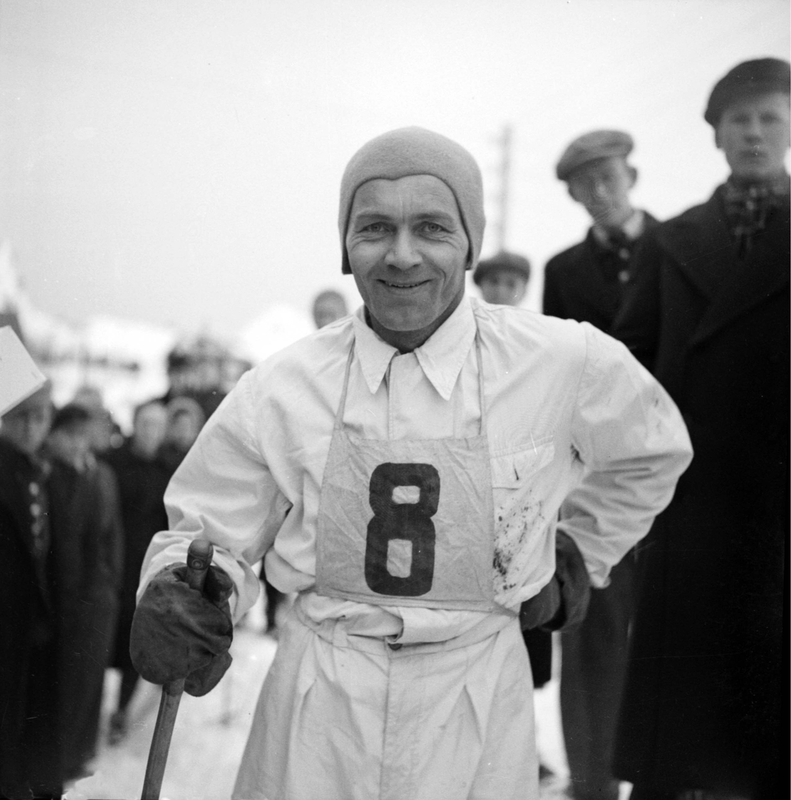
Bernt Østerkløft

Bernt Østerkløft (6 April 1906 – 20 July 1996) was a Norwegian Nordic combined skier who competed in the 1930s. He finished sixth in the Nordic combined event at the 1936 Winter Olympics in Garmisch-Partenkirchen.

He was born in Sørfold Municipality in 1906 and died in Fauske Municipality in 1996.
