= Alan Washbond =

American bobsledder (1899–1965)

Personal information
- Full name: Alan Morgan Washbond
- Born: 14 October 1899 Keene, New York, US
- Died: 30 July 1965 (aged 65) Plattsburgh, New York, US

Sport
- Sport: Bobsleigh
Medal record
Men's bobsleigh
Representing the United States
Gold medal – first place	1936 Garmisch-Partehkirchen	Two-man

Alan M. Washbond (October 14, 1899 – July 30, 1965) was an American bobsledder who competed in the 1930s. A native of Keene Valley, New York, he won the gold medal in the two-man event at the 1936 Winter Olympics in Garmisch-Partenkirchen.

A street in Keene Valley, Alan Washbond Drive, is named in his honor. His son, Waightman, competed for the US in bobsleigh at the 1948 and 1956 Winter Olympics.
