= Gordon Smith (ice hockey) =

American ice hockey player

Medal record

Men's ice hockey

Representing the United States

Olympic Games
Silver medal – second place	1932 Lake Placid	Team
Bronze medal – third place	1936 Garmisch-Partenkirchen	Team

Gordon Smith (February 14, 1908 – October 22, 1999) was an American ice hockey player who competed in the 1932 Winter Olympics and 1936 Winter Olympics.

== Early life ==
Smith was a native of Winchester, Massachusetts. He briefly attended Boston University before playing for the Boston Olympics and Boston Hockey Club.

== Career ==
Smith was a member of the United States men's national ice hockey team, which won the silver medal at the 1932 Winter Olympics in Lake Placid, New York. He played one match and scored one goal. Four years later, he was again a member of the American ice hockey team, which won the bronze medal. He played all eight matches and scored one goal.

== Death ==
Smith died in Westwood, Massachusetts.
