= Ice hockey at the 1936 Winter Olympics =

Tournament details
- Host country: Germany
- Venues: 2 (in 1 host city)
- Dates: 6–16 February 1936
- Teams: 15

Final positions
- Champions: Great Britain (1st title)
- Runners-up: Canada
- Third place: United States
- Fourth place: Czechoslovakia

Tournament statistics
- Games played: 37
- Goals scored: 165 (4.46 per game)
- Scoring leader: (Canada) Hugh Farquharson (10 goals)

The men's ice hockey tournament at the 1936 Winter Olympics in Garmisch-Partenkirchen, Germany, was the fifth Olympic Championship, also serving as the tenth World Championships and the 21st European Championships.

The British national ice hockey team pulled off a major upset when they won the gold medal, marking a number of firsts in international ice hockey competition. Great Britain made history as the first team ever to win an Olympic, World, and European (its second) Championships and the first to win all three in the same year. They were the first team to stop Canada from winning the Olympic ice hockey gold, following Canada's four consecutive gold medals.

== Tournament summary ==
In previous Olympics, the Great Britain team had finished third (1924), and fourth (1928) but with teams that were, "largely composed of Canadian Army officers and university graduates living in the U.K." It was decided that their team must be British-born this time, and while only one player on the team was born in Canada, nine of the thirteen players on the roster grew up in Canada, and eleven had played previously in Canada.

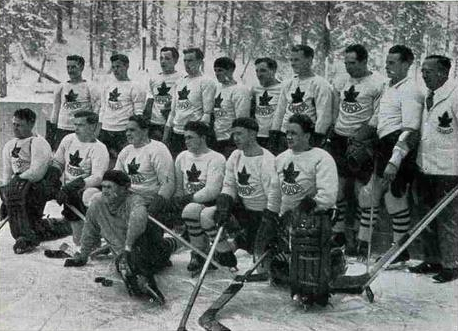
Canadian men's ice hockey team (the Port Arthur Bearcats) at the 1936 Olympic Games

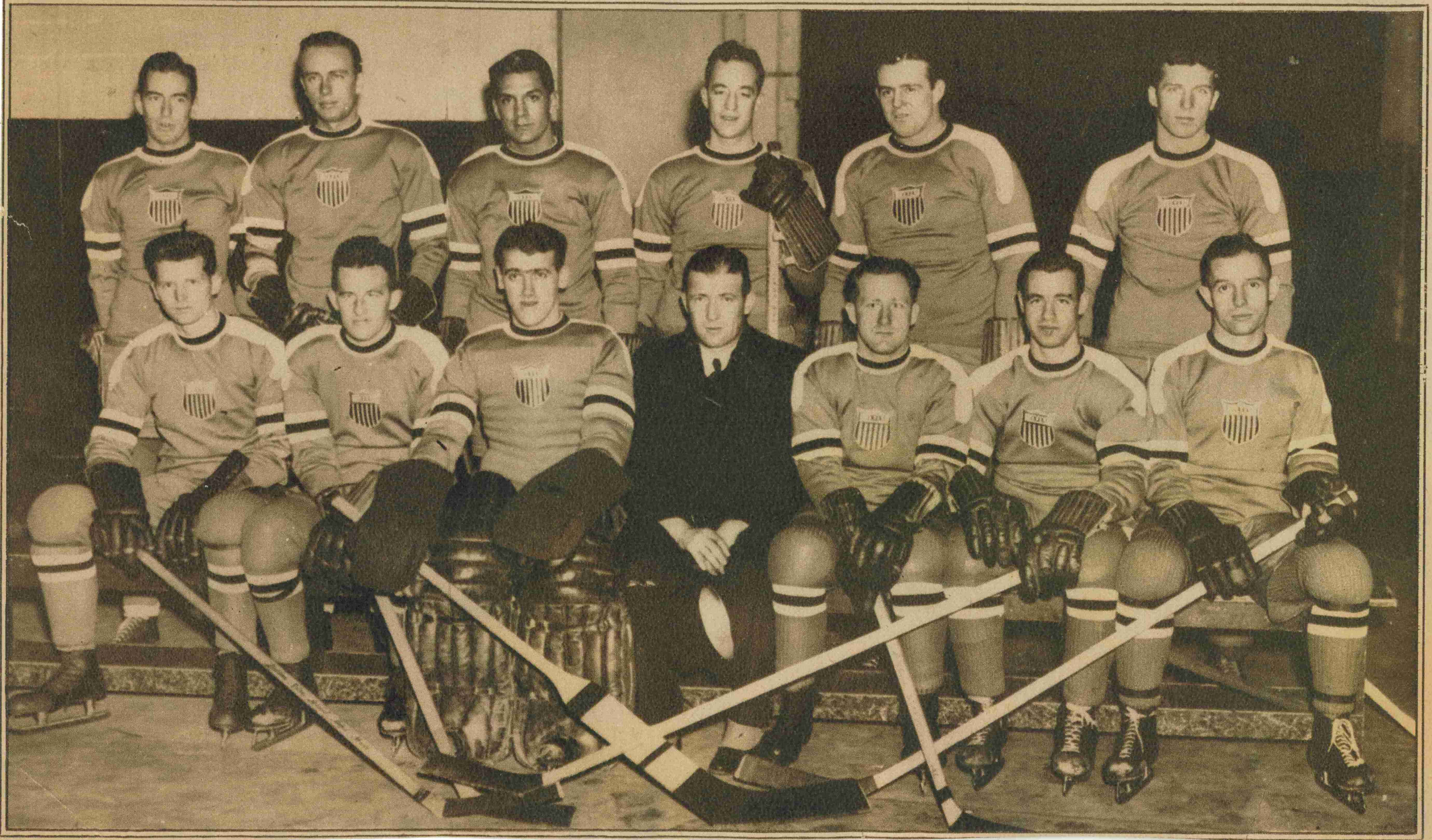
1936 U.S. Olympic ice hockey team

The Ligue Internationale de Hockey sur Glace (LIHG) which oversaw ice hockey at the Olympics, met before the games started and ruled that Jimmy Foster and Alex Archer were ineligible to compete for Great Britain since the players were under suspension by the Canadian Amateur Hockey Association (CAHA) for not seeking permission to transfer internationally. Great Britain's manager Bunny Ahearne contested that international rules stated a player could leave a country without seeking permission, and the CAHA suspensions should not apply. CAHA president E. A. Gilroy had lodged a complaint with the LIHG in September 1935, but the LIHG had not held a meeting until the eve of the Olympics. Gilroy denied making a last-minute protest for fear of Canada (represented by 1935 Allan Cup runners-up Port Arthur Bearcats) losing to Great Britain. He chose not to object to the two players participating as a gesture of sportsmanship towards Great Britain. The Canadian Press reported that Canadian officials agreed to lift the suspensions on Foster and Archer after "considerable pressure had been brought to bear on Canadian officials by British Olympic higher-ups".

Still unhappy with the state of affairs were the Americans, who did not believe the rules were being followed, and the French, who were very angry that Canada did not repeal their protest with them. Before the second round of games began, other participating hockey nations threatened to protest the victories by Great Britain due to the use of CAHA players, and called for an emergency meeting.

Yugoslavia was to have competed, but dropped out on short notice. For the opening round, the 15 teams were drawn into three groups of four and one group of three. The top four finishers of the 1935 World Championships (Canada, Switzerland, Great Britain, Czechoslovakia) were guaranteed placement in separate groups. And despite the non-participation of the United States the previous year, the organizers recognized the relative strength of the American team, and guaranteed their placement would not be in World Champion Canada's group.

The tournament itself featured very close play for the medals. It was played in three rounds beginning with four groups, where the two best teams of each group moved on to two groups of four, where again the two best moved on to a final round robin group of four, to determine the medals.

The major upset occurred in the semi-finals, when Britain's Edgar Brenchley scored late in the third to defeat Canada two to one, setting up the eventual gold medal outcome. The format at these Olympics was to have head-to-head results from the semi-finals carried forward, so that the finals could be a four team round robin with only two additional games per team. The British team's shock victory over the Canadians, plus the win by the USA over Czechoslovakia, both counted in the tables for the final round.

Before the final round began, Canada threatened to withdraw from Olympic hockey when it learned that the playoffs format would carry over the loss to Great Britain past the second round-robin series, since the tournament format stated that teams did not have to play one another more than once. Gilroy was unaware of the playoff format in advance of the Olympics, and took objection to the sportsmanship of Canadian officials being questioned, after a special meeting decided not to alter the format.

In the final round, the British team beat Czechoslovakia, then played six scoreless periods against the USA before the game was called a tie, ensuring a silver or gold for the British. In the tournament's final game, Canada could win silver, and Britain gold, if Canada defeated the US. The Americans could still have deprived Britain of the gold with a win over Canada by a score that matched or bested Britain's goal ratio, for example 1-0 or 5-1. The Americans were very tired from the marathon scoreless tie, and lost one to nothing. The 1936 tournament was the first time in which Canada did not win the gold medal in ice hockey at the Olympic Games, which led to the CAHA and Gilroy being heavily scrutinized by media in Canada.

Another story of this Olympic hockey tournament was the participation of Rudi Ball. The German leadership allowed this top player to lead their hockey team at these German hosted Olympics, making him the only Jew to represent Germany at these Olympic Games.

== Medalists ==
Gold	Silver	Bronze
Great Britain; Carl Erhardt (Captain); James Foster; Gordon Dailley; Archibald Stinchcombe; Edgar Brenchley; John Coward; James Chappell; Alexander Archer; Gerry Davey; James Borland; Robert Wyman; Jack Kilpatrick; Art Child	Canada; Francis Moore; Arthur Nash; Herman Murray; Walter Kitchen; Raymond Milton; David Neville; Kenneth Farmer; Hugh Farquharson; Maxwell Deacon; Alexander Sinclair; Bill Thomson; James Haggarty; Ralph St. Germain	United States; Thomas Moone; Francis Shaughnessy; Philip LaBatte; Frank Stubbs; John Garrison; Paul Rowe; John Lax; Gordon Smith; Elbridge Ross; Francis Spain; August Kammer

== Participating nations ==
- Austria (12)
- Belgium (10)
- Canada (13)
- Czechoslovakia (13)
- France (11)
- Germany (12)
- Great Britain (13)
- Hungary (13)
- Italy (11)
- Japan (9)
- Latvia (11)
- Poland (11)
- Sweden (13)
- Switzerland (12)
- United States (11)

== First round ==
Top two teams in each group advanced to Second Round.

=== Group A ===
Pos	Team	Pld	W	D	L	GF	GA	GD	Pts	Qualification or relegation
1	Canada	3	3	0	0	24	3	+21	6	Advance to Second Round
2	Austria	3	2	0	1	11	7	+4	4	Advance to Second Round
3	Poland	3	1	0	2	11	12	−1	2	
4	Latvia	3	0	0	3	3	27	−24	0	

Source: Official Report

6 February	Canada	8–1 (5–0,2–1,1–0)	Poland	Riessersee, Garmisch-Partenkirchen
7 February	Canada	11–0 (2–0,3–0,6–0)	Latvia	Olympia-Kunsteisstadion, Garmisch-Partenkirchen
7 February	Austria	2–1 (0–0,0–0,2–1)	Poland	Olympia-Kunsteisstadion, Garmisch-Partenkirchen
8 February	Canada	5–2 (4–0,1–2,0–0)	Austria	Olympia-Kunsteisstadion, Garmisch-Partenkirchen
8 February	Poland	9–2 (1–0,4–0,4–2)	Latvia	Olympia-Kunsteisstadion, Garmisch-Partenkirchen
9 February	Austria	7–1 (4–0,0–0,3–1)	Latvia	Riessersee, Garmisch-Partenkirchen

=== Group B ===
Pos	Team	Pld	W	D	L	GF	GA	GD	Pts	Qualification or relegation
1	Germany	3	2	0	1	5	1	+4	4	Advance to Second Round
2	United States	3	2	0	1	5	2	+3	4	Advance to Second Round
3	Italy	3	1	0	2	2	5	−3	2	
4	Switzerland	3	1	0	2	1	5	−4	2	

Source: Official Report

6 February	Germany	0–1 (0–1,0–0,0–0)	United States	Olympia-Kunsteisstadion, Garmisch-Partenkirchen
7 February	United States	3–0 (0–0,3–0,0–0)	Switzerland	Olympia-Kunsteisstadion, Garmisch-Partenkirchen
7 February	Germany	3–0 (1–0,1–0,1–0)	Italy	Olympia-Kunsteisstadion, Garmisch-Partenkirchen
8 February	Germany	2–0 (0–0,1–0,1–0)	Switzerland	Olympia-Kunsteisstadion, Garmisch-Partenkirchen
8 February	United States	1–2 OT (0–0,0–0,1–1,0–0,0–1)	Italy	Olympia-Kunsteisstadion, Garmisch-Partenkirchen
9 February	Switzerland	1–0 (0–0,1–0,0–0)	Italy	Olympia-Kunsteisstadion, Garmisch-Partenkirchen

=== Group C ===
Pos	Team	Pld	W	D	L	GF	GA	GD	Pts	Qualification or relegation
1	Czechoslovakia	3	3	0	0	10	0	+10	6	Advance to Second Round
2	Hungary	3	2	0	1	14	5	+9	4	Advance to Second Round
3	France	3	1	0	2	4	7	−3	2	
4	Belgium	3	0	0	3	4	20	−16	0	

Source: Official Report

6 February	Hungary	11–2 (1–1,2–0,8–1)	Belgium	Olympia-Kunsteisstadion, Garmisch-Partenkirchen
7 February	Czechoslovakia	5–0 (0–0,4–0,1–0)	Belgium	Riessersee, Garmisch-Partenkirchen
7 February	Hungary	3–0 (0–0,1–0,2–0)	France	Riessersee, Garmisch-Partenkirchen
8 February	Czechoslovakia	3–0 (1–0,1–0,1–0)	Hungary	Olympia-Kunsteisstadion, Garmisch-Partenkirchen
8 February	France	4–2 OT (1–0,0–1,0–0,1–1,2–0)	Belgium	Riessersee, Garmisch-Partenkirchen
9 February	Czechoslovakia	2–0 (0–0,1–0,1–0)	France	Olympia-Kunsteisstadion, Garmisch-Partenkirchen

=== Group D ===
Pos	Team	Pld	W	D	L	GF	GA	GD	Pts	Qualification or relegation
1	Great Britain	2	2	0	0	4	0	+4	4	Advance to Second Round
2	Sweden	2	1	0	1	2	1	+1	2	Advance to Second Round
3	Japan	2	0	0	2	0	5	−5	0	

Source: Official Report

6 February	Great Britain	1–0 (1–0,0–0,0–0)	Sweden	Olympia-Kunsteisstadion, Garmisch-Partenkirchen
7 February	Great Britain	3–0 (2–0,0–0,1–0)	Japan	Riessersee, Garmisch-Partenkirchen
8 February	Sweden	2–0 (1–0,1–0,0–0)	Japan	Olympia-Kunsteisstadion, Garmisch-Partenkirchen

== Second round ==
The top two teams in each group advanced to Final Round.

=== Group A ===
Pos	Team	Pld	W	D	L	GF	GA	GD	Pts	Qualification or relegation
1	Great Britain	3	2	1	0	8	3	+5	5	Advance to Final Round
2	Canada	3	2	0	1	22	4	+18	4	Advance to Final Round
3	Germany	3	1	1	1	5	8	−3	3	
4	Hungary	3	0	0	3	2	22	−20	0	

Source: Official Report

11 February	Germany	2–1 (0–0,1–0,1–1)	Hungary	Olympia-Kunsteisstadion, Garmisch-Partenkirchen
11 February	Great Britain	2–1 (1–1,0–0,1–0)	Canada	Olympia-Kunsteisstadion, Garmisch-Partenkirchen
12 February	Germany	1–1 OT (0–0,0–1,1–0,0–0,0–0,0–0)	Great Britain	Olympia-Kunsteisstadion, Garmisch-Partenkirchen
12 February	Canada	15–0 (3–0,9–0,3–0)	Hungary	Olympia-Kunsteisstadion, Garmisch-Partenkirchen
13 February	Great Britain	5–1 (1–0,3–1,1–0)	Hungary	Olympia-Kunsteisstadion, Garmisch-Partenkirchen
13 February	Germany	2–6 (0–1,0–3,2–2)	Canada	Olympia-Kunsteisstadion, Garmisch-Partenkirchen

=== Group B ===
Pos	Team	Pld	W	D	L	GF	GA	GD	Pts	Qualification or relegation
1	United States	3	3	0	0	5	1	+4	6	Advance to Final Round
2	Czechoslovakia	3	2	0	1	6	4	+2	4	Advance to Final Round
3	Sweden	3	1	0	2	3	6	−3	2	
4	Austria	3	0	0	3	1	4	−3	0	

Source: Official Report

11 February	United States	2–0 (0–0,2–0,0–0)	Czechoslovakia	Riessersee, Garmisch-Partenkirchen
11 February	Sweden	1–0 (1–0,0–0,0–0)	Austria	Riessersee, Garmisch-Partenkirchen
12 February	United States	1–0 (0–0,1–0,0–0)	Austria	Olympia-Kunsteisstadion, Garmisch-Partenkirchen
12 February	Czechoslovakia	4–1 (0–1,2–0,2–0)	Sweden	Olympia-Kunsteisstadion, Garmisch-Partenkirchen
13 February	United States	2–1 (0–0,1–1,1–0)	Sweden	Olympia-Kunsteisstadion, Garmisch-Partenkirchen
13 February	Czechoslovakia	2–1 (0–0,2–1,0–0)	Austria	Olympia-Kunsteisstadion, Garmisch-Partenkirchen

== Final round ==
Team	Pld	W	D	L	GF	GA	GD	Pts
Great Britain	3	2	1	0	7	1	+6	5
Canada	3	2	0	1	9	2	+7	4
United States	3	1	1	1	2	1	+1	3
Czechoslovakia	3	0	0	3	0	14	−14	0

Source: HockeyCanada.ca

11 February	Great Britain	2–1 (1–1, 0–0, 1–0)	Canada	Olympia-Kunsteisstadion, Garmisch-Partenkirchen
11 February	United States	2–0 (0–0, 2–0, 0–0)	Czechoslovakia	Riessersee, Garmisch-Partenkirchen
14 February	Great Britain	5–0 (2–0,3–0,0–0)	Czechoslovakia	Olympia-Kunsteisstadion, Garmisch-Partenkirchen
15 February	Canada	7–0 (3–0,3–0,1–0)	Czechoslovakia	Olympia-Kunsteisstadion, Garmisch-Partenkirchen
15 February	Great Britain	0–0 OT (0–0,0–0,0–0,0–0,0–0,0–0)	United States	Olympia-Kunsteisstadion, Garmisch-Partenkirchen
16 February	Canada	1–0 (1–0,0–0,0–0)	United States	Olympia-Kunsteisstadion, Garmisch-Partenkirchen

N.B. – Tournament rules stated that relevant results from the semi-final round would be carried over to the final round. After the semi-final round, the Canadian Amateur Hockey Association and the German organizers appealed against this rule and asked that in the final stage all four teams should play each other with the semi-final results ignored. This appeal was overwhelmingly rejected by the Olympic authorities. Thus, the 11 February games of Canada vs. Great Britain and the United States vs. Czechoslovakia were counted as games in the final round, hence their replication in both tables.

== Final ranking ==
1st place, gold medalist(s)	Great Britain
2nd place, silver medalist(s)	Canada
3rd place, bronze medalist(s)	United States
4	Czechoslovakia
5	Germany
5	Sweden
7	Austria
7	Hungary
9	Italy
9	France
9	Japan
9	Poland
13	Belgium
13	Latvia
13	Switzerland

== European Championship medal table ==
Gold medal	Great Britain
Silver medal	Czechoslovakia
Bronze medal	Germany
Bronze medal	Sweden
5	Austria
5	Hungary
7	France
7	Italy
7	Poland
10	Belgium
10	Latvia
10	Switzerland

== Statistics ==
=== Average age ===
Team Belgium was the oldest team in the tournament, averaging 29 years and 2 months. Team Germany was the youngest team in the tournament, averaging 23 years and 1 months. Gold medalists Great Britain averaged 25 years and 4 months. Tournament average was 25 years and 2 months.

=== Top scorer ===
Team	GP	G	A	Pts
(Canada) Hugh Farquharson	8	10	–	10

There is some disagreement as to the totals of Farquharson, both the IOC and IIHF maintain that he scored ten goals. Assist totals were not officially tabulated at the time, and sources indicate anywhere from five to ten.
