= John Lax =

American ice hockey player (1911–2001)

Olympic medal record

Men's Ice hockey
Bronze medal – third place	1936 Garmisch-Partenkirchen	Team

John Charles Lax (July 23, 1911 – July 14, 2001) was an American ice hockey player who competed in the 1936 Winter Olympics.

In 1936 he was a member of the American ice hockey team, which won the bronze medal.

He was born and died in Arlington, Massachusetts.
