= Elbridge Ross =

American ice hockey player

Olympic medal record

Men's Ice hockey
Bronze medal – third place	1936 Garmisch-Partenkirchen	Team

Elbridge Baker Ross Jr. (August 2, 1909 – November 13, 1980) was an American ice hockey player who competed in the 1936 Winter Olympics. He was born in Melrose, Massachusetts and died in Saint Petersburg, Florida. In 1936 he was a member of the United States men's national ice hockey team, which won the bronze medal at the 1936 Winter Olympics.
