= Francis Spain =

American ice hockey player

Olympic medal record

Men's Ice hockey
Bronze medal – third place	1936 Garmisch-Partenkirchen	Team

Francis Jones Spain (February 17, 1909 – June 23, 1977) was an American amateur ice hockey player who competed in the 1936 Winter Olympics in Garmisch-Partenkirchen, Germany.

Frank Spain was born on an ancestral plantation in Brooks County, Georgia, but later moved to Waban, Massachusetts, where he learned to play hockey on frozen ponds. He attended Phillips Exeter Academy prep school and then Dartmouth College, where he majored in philosophy and played baseball and ice hockey as a member of the class of 1934. He left Dartmouth to play for the Boston Olympics, where he was the team captain for the 1933–1934 season. After his amateur ice-hockey career, he served as a naval officer and toured Europe. Following his marriage in 1941, he settled in Rochester, New York, where he began a business and a family.

In 1936 he was a member and captain of the United States ice hockey team, which won the bronze medal. The medal currently resides at the United States Hockey Hall of Fame in Eveleth, Minnesota.

He was born in Quitman, Georgia, and died in Fairport, New York.
