= Anton Eisgruber =

German Nordic combined skier

Personal information
- Nationality: German
- Born: 1 November 1912; Garmisch-Partenkirchen, Germany
- Died: 3 July 1994 (aged 81); Ohlstadt, Germany

Sport
- Sport: Nordic combined

Anton Eisgruber (1 November 1912 – 3 July 1994) was a German skier. He competed in the Nordic combined event at the 1936 Winter Olympics.
