= Frank Stubbs (ice hockey) =

American ice hockey player

Personal information
- Born: Franklin Raymond Stubbs Jr. July 12, 1909 Wellfleet, Massachusetts, U.S.
- Died: April 20, 1993 (aged 83) Melrose, Massachusetts, U.S.

Sport
- Sport: Ice hockey
- University team: Harvard Crimson
Medal record
Men's Ice hockey
Bronze medal – third place	1936 Garmisch-Partenkirchen	Team

Franklin Raymond Stubbs Jr. (July 12, 1909 – April 20, 1993) was an American ice hockey player who competed in the 1936 Winter Olympics.

== Early life ==
Stubbs was born in Wellfleet, Massachusetts. He played on the Harvard Crimson men's ice hockey team for two years, coached by his brother, Joe.

== Career ==
At the 1936 Winter Olympics, Stubbs was a member of the United States men's national ice hockey team, which won the bronze medal.

In 1940, Stubbs entered the United States Armed Forces. For his service during World War II, was awarded several Purple Hearts, a Bronze Arrowhead Device, a Presidential Unit Citation, a World War II Victory Medal, and a European–African–Middle Eastern Campaign Medal.

== Personal life ==
Stubbs died in Melrose, Massachusetts.
