= Edward Blood =

American Nordic combined skier

Personal information
- Born: August 15, 1908 Bradford, Vermont, United States
- Died: June 13, 1991 (aged 82) Durham, New Hampshire, United States

Sport
- Sport: Nordic combined

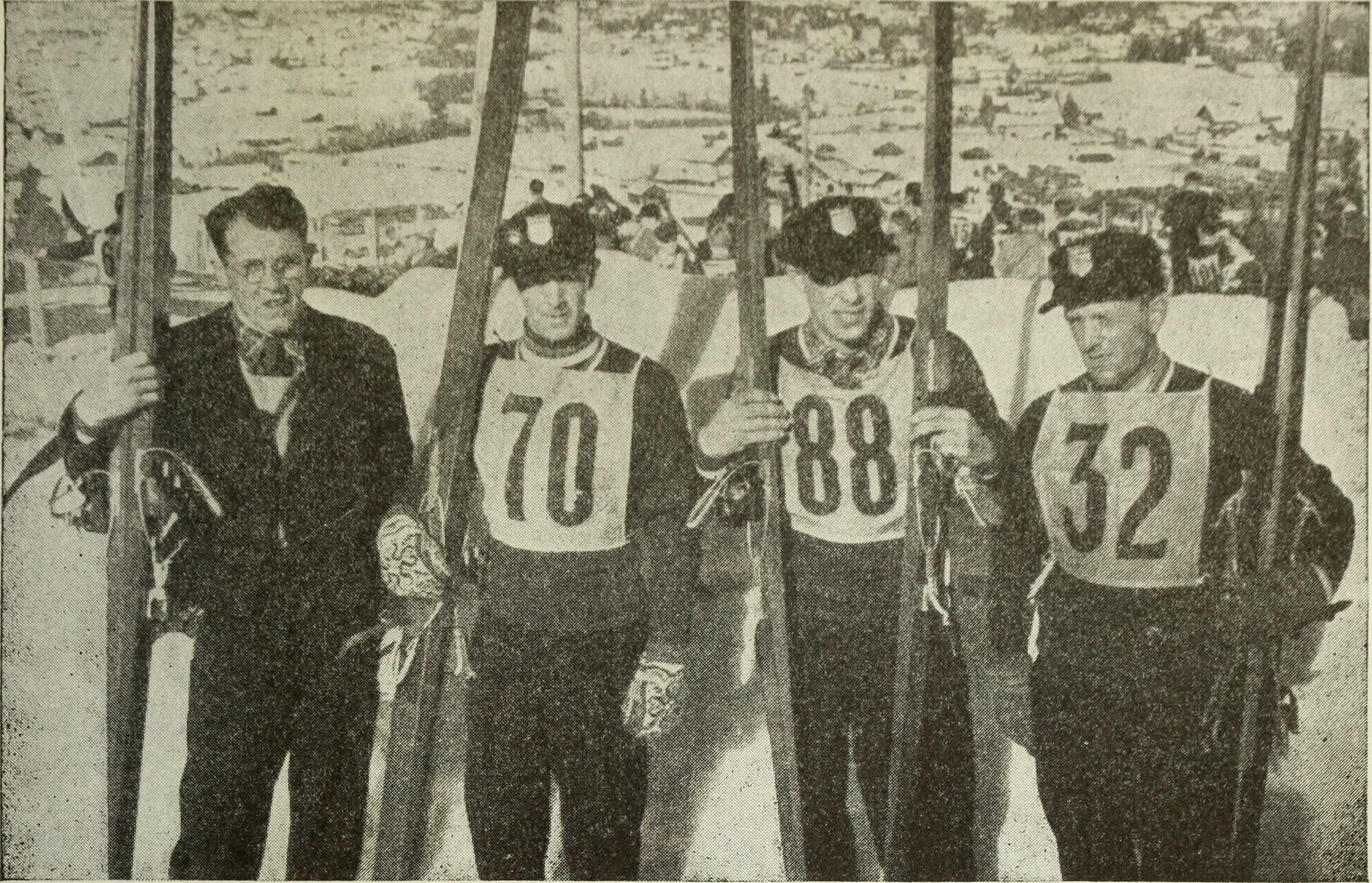
Eddie Blood (left), 1936

Edward Blood (August 15, 1908 – June 13, 1991) was an American skier. He competed in the Nordic combined events at the 1932 Winter Olympics and the 1936 Winter Olympics.
