= Paul Ottar Satre =

Paul Ottar Satre (September 9, 1908 – July 5, 1984) was an American ski jumper and cross-country skier.

Paul Ottar Sætre was born in Trysil Municipality in Hedmark county, Norway and emigrated to the United States. Between 1930 and 1935 he won 17 skiing meets. He competed in Nordic combined at the 1936 Winter Olympics in Garmisch-Partenkirchen. He was a brother of Karl Magnus Satre. He retired from competitive skiing in 1950. He was inducted into the National Ski Hall of Fame during 1971. He died in Lakeville, CT during 1984.
