= Karl Magnus Satre =

American Nordic combined skier (1904–1955)

Personal information
- Nationality: American
- Born: February 6, 1904 Trysil, Norway
- Died: January 14, 1955 (aged 50)

Sport
- Sport: Skiing
- Events: Cross-country skiing; Nordic combined

Karl Magnus Satre (February 6, 1904 – January 14, 1955) was a Norwegian-born American skier. He was a member of the U.S. Olympic Team in 1936.

Karl Magnus Satre (né Sætre) was born at Trysil Municipality in Hedmark, Norway. He was a brother of Olympic skier Paul Ottar Satre. He emigrated to the United States in 1927 and settled in Salisbury, Connecticut. He competed in cross-country skiing and Nordic combined at the 1936 Winter Olympics in Garmisch-Partenkirchen. He was six times American champion in Nordic combined.
