= Ice hockey at the 1936 Winter Olympics – Rosters =

The ice hockey team rosters at the 1936 Winter Olympics consisted of the following players:

== Austria ==
Head coach: Hans Weinberger

Pos.	Name	Birthdate	Team
D/F	Franz Csöngei	September 13, 1913 (aged 22)	N/A
F	Fritz Demmer	April 17, 1911 (aged 24)	N/A
F	Sepp Göbl	January 1, 1905 (aged 31)	N/A
F	Lambert Neumaier	February 13, 1910 (aged 25)	N/A
F	Oskar Nowak	March 25, 1913 (aged 22)	N/A
D	Franz Schüßler	January 10, 1911 (aged 25)	N/A
F	Emil Seidler	March 13, 1914 (aged 21)	N/A
F	Willibald Stanek	December 4, 1903 (aged 32)	N/A
F	Hans Tatzer	May 25, 1905 (aged 30)	N/A
D	Hans Trauttenberg (C)	January 6, 1909 (aged 27)	(England) Streatham
D	Rudolf Vojta	April 15, 1912 (aged 23)	N/A
G	Hermann Weiß	March 17, 1909 (aged 26)	N/A

== Belgium ==
Head coach: (Canada) Bert Forsyth

Pos.	Name	Birthdate	Team
F	Walter Bastenie	May 29, 1910 (aged 25)	(Belgium) Brussels IHSC
G	Robert Baudinne	January 10, 1900 (aged 36)	(Belgium) Brussels IHSC
D	Roger Bureau	February 1, 1905 (aged 31)	(Belgium) CP Antwerp
F/D	Fernand Carrez	October 28, 1905 (aged 30)	(Belgium) CSH Brussels
D	Louis de Ridder	June 9, 1902 (aged 33)	(Belgium) CSH Brussels
F	Willy Kreitz	September 21, 1903 (aged 32)	N/A
D/F	Jef Lekens	April 22, 1911 (aged 24)	(Belgium) UP Antwerp
F	Georges Pootmans	May 19, 1917 (aged 18)	(Belgium) CSH Brussels
F	Carlos van den Driessche	August 31, 1901 (aged 34)	(Belgium) Brussels IHSC
F	Pierre van Reyschoot (C)	December 9, 1906 (aged 29)	(Belgium) CP Antwerp

== Canada ==
Head coach: Albert Pudas

Pos.	Name	Birthdate	Team
F	Maxwell Deacon	March 22, 1910 (aged 25)	(Canada) Port Arthur Bearcats
F	Kenneth Farmer	September 26, 1912 (aged 23)	(Canada) Port Arthur Bearcats
F	Hugh Farquharson	November 14, 1911 (aged 24)	(Canada) Port Arthur Bearcats
F	James Haggarty	April 14, 1914 (aged 21)	(Canada) Port Arthur Bearcats
D	Walter Kitchen	December 18, 1912 (aged 23)	(Canada) Port Arthur Bearcats
D	Raymond Milton	August 27, 1912 (aged 23)	(Canada) Port Arthur Bearcats
G	Dinty Moore	October 29, 1900 (aged 35)	(Canada) Port Arthur Bearcats
D	Herman Murray (C)	December 5, 1909 (aged 26)	(Canada) Port Arthur Bearcats
G	Arthur Nash	May 5, 1914 (aged 21)	(Canada) Port Arthur Bearcats
F	David Neville	May 2, 1908 (aged 27)	(Canada) Port Arthur Bearcats
F	Alexander Sinclair	June 28, 1911 (aged 24)	(Canada) Port Arthur Bearcats
F	Ralph St. Germain	January 19, 1904 (aged 32)	(Canada) Port Arthur Bearcats
F	Bill Thomson	March 23, 1914 (aged 21)	(Canada) Port Arthur Bearcats

== Czechoslovakia ==
Head coach: Antonin Porges

Pos.	Name	Birthdate	Team
G	Josef Boháč	April 20, 1914 (aged 21)	(Czechoslovakia) HC Sparta Praha
F	Alois Cetkovský	September 5, 1908 (aged 27)	(Czechoslovakia) HC Slavia Praha
F	Karel Hromádka	May 24, 1905 (aged 30)	(Czechoslovakia) HC Podoli
F	Drahomír Jirotka	September 20, 1915 (aged 20)	(Czechoslovakia) HC Sparta Praha
F	Zdeněk Jirotka	February 15, 1914 (aged 21)	(Czechoslovakia) HC Sparta Praha
D	Jan Košek	January 11, 1914 (aged 22)	(Czechoslovakia) HC Slavia Praha
F/G	Oldřich Kučera	July 1, 1914 (aged 21)	(Czechoslovakia) LTC Praha
F	Josef Maleček (C)	June 18, 1903 (aged 32)	(Czechoslovakia) LTC Praha
G	Jan Peka	July 27, 1894 (aged 41)	(Czechoslovakia) LTC Praha
D	Jaroslav Pušbauer	July 31, 1901 (aged 34)	(Czechoslovakia) LTC Praha
F	Jiří Tožička	November 14, 1901 (aged 34)	(Czechoslovakia) LTC Praha
F	Ladislav Trojak	June 14, 1915 (aged 20)	(Czechoslovakia) LTC Praha
F	Walter Ulrich	June 15, 1912 (aged 23)	(Czechoslovakia) DFK Komotau

== France ==
Pos.	Name	Birthdate	Team
F	Philippe Boyard	October 31, 1916 (aged 19)	(France) Français Volants Paris
D	Pierre Claret	July 1, 1911 (aged 24)	(France) Chamonix
F	Marcel Couttet	April 27, 1912 (aged 23)	(France) Chamonix
F	Michel Delesalle	December 22, 1907 (aged 28)	N/A
F	Jean-Pierre Hagnauer	February 24, 1913 (aged 22)	(France) Français Volants Paris
F	Albert Hassler	November 2, 1903 (aged 32)	N/A
D	Jacques Lacarrière (C)	September 12, 1906 (aged 29)	(France) Français Volants Paris
D	Pierre Lorin	October 25, 1912 (aged 23)	(France) Stade Français
G	Jacques Morisson	March 28, 1907 (aged 28)	N/A
G	Michel Paccard	November 1, 1908 (aged 27)	(France) Chamonix
F/D	Guy Volpert	November 10, 1916 (aged 19)	N/A

== Germany ==
Head coach: (Canada) Vic Hoffinger

Pos.	Name	Birthdate	Team
F	Rudi Ball (C)	June 22, 1911 (aged 24)	(Italy) Diavoli Rossoneri Milano
G	Wilhelm Egginger	April 6, 1912 (aged 23)	(Germany) SC Riessersee
F	Werner George	September 12, 1913 (aged 22)	(Germany) Berliner Schlittschuh-Club
F/D	Gustav Jaenecke	May 22, 1908 (aged 27)	(Germany) Berliner Schlittschuh-Club
F	Alois Kuhn	November 23, 1910 (aged 25)	(Germany) ESV Füssen
F	Karl Kögel	October 26, 1917 (aged 18)	(Germany) ESV Füssen
F	Philipp Schenk	December 14, 1914 (aged 21)	(Germany) SC Riessersee
F/D	Herbert Schibukat	October 27, 1914 (aged 21)	(Germany) SV Rastenburg
F	Georg Strobl	February 9, 1910 (aged 25)	(Germany) SC Riessersee
F	Paul Trautmann	December 16, 1916 (aged 19)	(Germany) Berliner Schlittschuh-Club
D	Joachim-Albrecht von Bethmann-Hollweg	December 16, 1911 (aged 24)	(Germany) SC Riessersee
F	Toni Wiedemann	December 30, 1911 (aged 24)	(Germany) ESV Füssen

== Great Britain ==
Head coach: (Canada) Percy Nicklin

Pos.	Name	Birthdate	Team
F	Alex Archer	May 1, 1911 (aged 24)	(England) Wembley Lions
D/F	Jimmy Borland	March 25, 1910 (aged 25)	(England) Brighton Tigers
F	Edgar Brenchley	February 10, 1912 (aged 23)	(England) Richmond Hawks
F	Jimmy Chappell	March 3, 1915 (aged 20)	(England) Earls Court Rangers
G	Art Child	September 15, 1916 (aged 19)	(England) Wembley Lions
F	John Coward	October 28, 1910 (aged 25)	(England) Richmond Hawks
F/D	Gordon Dailley	July 24, 1911 (aged 24)	(England) Wembley Lions
F/D	Gerry Davey	September 14, 1914 (aged 21)	(England) Streatham
D	Carl Erhardt (C)	February 15, 1897 (aged 38)	(England) Streatham
G	Jimmy Foster	September 13, 1905 (aged 30)	(England) Richmond Hawks
F	Jack Kilpatrick	July 7, 1917 (aged 18)	(England) Wembley Lions
F	Archie Stinchcombe	November 17, 1912 (aged 23)	(England) Streatham
D/F	Robert Wyman	April 27, 1909 (aged 26)	(England) Wembley Canadiens

== Hungary ==
Head coach: Géza Lator

Pos.	Name	Birthdate	Team
D	Miklós Barcza	January 7, 1908 (aged 28)	(Hungary) BKE Budapest
D/F	István Csák	February 18, 1915 (aged 20)	(Hungary) Ferencvárosi TC
F/D	Mátyás Farkas	August 13, 1903 (aged 32)	(Hungary) BKE Budapest
F	András Gergely	January 20, 1916 (aged 20)	(Hungary) BKE Budapest
F	László Gergely	January 20, 1916 (aged 20)	(Hungary) BKE Budapest
F	Béla Háray	March 25, 1915 (aged 20)	(Hungary) BBTE Budapest
D/F	Frigyes Helmeczi	December 19, 1913 (aged 22)	(Hungary) BBTE Budapest
F	Zoltán Jeney	May 13, 1910 (aged 25)	(Switzerland) Arosa
F	Sándor Miklós	March 5, 1915 (aged 20)	(Hungary) BKE Budapest
F	Sándor Minder	October 25, 1907 (aged 28)	(Hungary) BKE Budapest
G	Ferenc Monostori	January 26, 1909 (aged 27)	N/A
D/F	László Róna	May 20, 1913 (aged 22)	(Hungary) BKE Budapest
F/D	Ferenc Szamosi	February 15, 1915 (aged 20)	(Hungary) BBTE Budapest

== Italy ==
Head coach: Giampiero Medri

Pos.	Name	Birthdate	Team
G	Enrico Calcaterra	January 1, 1905 (aged 31)	(Italy) ADG Milano
D	Gianmario Baroni	January 21, 1910 (aged 26)	N/A
D/F	Ignazio Dionisi	February 27, 1913 (aged 22)	(Italy) Diavoli Rossoneri Milano
G	Augusto Gerosa	October 1, 1909 (aged 26)	(Italy) Diavoli Rossoneri Milano
F	Mario Maiocchi	April 27, 1913 (aged 22)	(Italy) Diavoli Rossoneri Milano
F	Camillo Mussi	November 18, 1911 (aged 24)	(Italy) ADG Milano
D	Franco Rossi	January 2, 1916 (aged 20)	(Italy) ADG Milano
F	Giovanni Scotti	September 1, 1911 (aged 24)	(Italy) Diavoli Rossoneri Milano
D/F	Decio Trovati	October 16, 1906 (aged 29)	(Italy) Diavoli Rossoneri Milano
D	Luigi Zucchini	October 22, 1915 (aged 20)	(Italy) Diavoli Rossoneri Milano
F	Mario Zucchini	July 5, 1910 (aged 25)	(Italy) Diavoli Rossoneri Milano

== Japan ==
Head coach: Shunichi Tezuka

Pos.	Name	Birthdate	Team
F	Kenichi Furuya	November 8, 1912 (aged 23)	(Japan) Keio University
D	Masahiro Hayama	January 23, 1910 (aged 26)	N/A
F	Susumu Hirano	April 23, 1910 (aged 25)	N/A
G	Teiji Honma	April 14, 1911 (aged 24)	N/A
D	Tatsuo Ichikawa	February 11, 1916 (aged 19)	(Japan) Waseda Polar Bears
F	Shinkichi Kamei	June 10, 1910 (aged 25)	(Japan) Keio University
F	Kozue Kinoshita	April 15, 1912 (aged 23)	N/A
F	Masatatsu Kitazawa	April 29, 1916 (aged 19)	(Japan) Oji Seishi
F	Toshihiko Shoji (C)	April 23, 1909 (aged 26)	N/A

== Latvia ==
Head coach: Arvīds Jurgens

Pos.	Name	Birthdate	Team
F	Aleksejs Auziņš	August 7, 1910 (aged 25)	(Latvia) US Riga
F	Jānis Bebris	July 28, 1917 (aged 18)	(Latvia) US Riga
F	Roberts Bluķis	April 4, 1913 (aged 22)	(Latvia) US Riga
F/D	Arvīds Jurgens	May 27, 1905 (aged 30)	(Latvia) ASK Riga
G	Herberts Kušķis	March 5, 1913 (aged 22)	(Latvia) ASK Riga
G	Roberts Lapainis	October 17, 1913 (aged 22)	(Latvia) US Riga
D/F	Kārlis Paegle	October 4, 1911 (aged 24)	(Latvia) ASK Riga
F	Arvīds Petersons	October 24, 1913 (aged 22)	(Latvia) ASK Riga
F/D	Ādolfs Petrovskis	April 7, 1912 (aged 23)	(Latvia) US Riga
F	Jānis Rozītis	March 20, 1913 (aged 22)	(Latvia) RFK Riga
D	Leonīds Vedējs (C)	October 12, 1908 (aged 27)	(Latvia) US Riga

== Poland ==
Head coach: Lucjan Kulej

Pos.	Name	Birthdate	Team
D	Mieczysław Kasprzycki	December 13, 1910 (aged 25)	(Czechoslovakia) HC Slavia Praha
F	Adam Kowalski	December 19, 1912 (aged 23)	(Poland) Cracovia Krakow
F	Władysław Król	October 30, 1907 (aged 28)	(Poland) ŁKS Łódź
D/F	Witalis Ludwiczak	April 20, 1910 (aged 25)	(Poland) AZS Poznan
F	Czesław Marchewczyk	October 1, 1912 (aged 23)	(Poland) Cracovia Krakow
G	Henryk Przeździecki	February 20, 1909 (aged 26)	(Poland) Legia Warszawa
D	Kazimierz Sokołowski	March 26, 1908 (aged 27)	(Poland) Lechia Lwów
G	Józef Stogowski	November 27, 1899 (aged 36)	(Poland) AZS Poznan
F	Roman Stupnicki	November 30, 1913 (aged 22)	(Poland) Czarni Lwów
F	Andrzej Wołkowski	February 14, 1913 (aged 22)	(Poland) Cracovia Krakow
F	Edmund Zieliński	November 25, 1909 (aged 26)	(Poland) AZS Poznan

== Sweden ==
Head coach: (Canada) Vic Lindquist

Pos.	Name	Birthdate	Team
F	Stig Andersson	October 16, 1914 (aged 21)	(Sweden) Hammarby IF
F/D	Sven Bergqvist	August 20, 1914 (aged 21)	(Sweden) AIK
G	Herman Carlsson (C)	September 11, 1906 (aged 29)	(Sweden) AIK
F	Ruben Carlsson	January 29, 1913 (aged 23)	(Sweden) AIK
F	Holger Engberg	January 4, 1909 (aged 27)	(Sweden) AIK
F	Åke Ericson	May 16, 1913 (aged 22)	(Sweden) AIK
F	Lennart Hellman	October 2, 1914 (aged 21)	(Sweden) Hammarby IF
F	Torsten Jöhncke	March 14, 1912 (aged 23)	(Sweden) IK Göta
G	Wilhelm Larsson	June 11, 1911 (aged 24)	(Sweden) Karlsberg BK
F	Yngve Liljeberg	July 23, 1909 (aged 26)	(Sweden) IK Göta
D	Bertil Lundell	September 6, 1908 (aged 27)	(Sweden) Hammarby IF
D	Axel Nilsson	November 12, 1904 (aged 31)	(Sweden) AIK
F	Bertil Norberg	July 10, 1910 (aged 25)	(Sweden) AIK
F	Wilhelm Petersén	October 2, 1906 (aged 29)	N/A

== Switzerland ==
Head coach: Ulrich von Sury

Pos.	Name	Birthdate	Team
F	Ferdinand Cattini	November 27, 1916 (aged 19)	(Switzerland) HC Davos
F	Hans Cattini	January 24, 1914 (aged 22)	(Switzerland) HC Davos
F	Otto Heller	November 30, 1914 (aged 21)	(Switzerland) Bern
G	Arnold Hirtz	September 2, 1910 (aged 25)	N/A
D	Ernst Hug	October 23, 1910 (aged 25)	N/A
F	Charles Kessler	January 11, 1911 (aged 25)	(Switzerland) Zürcher SC
F	Herbert Kessler	December 28, 1912 (aged 23)	(Switzerland) Zürcher SC
G	Albert Künzler	February 9, 1911 (aged 24)	(Switzerland) Zürcher SC
D	Adolf Martignoni	July 28, 1909 (aged 26)	N/A
F	Thomas Pleisch	December 17, 1913 (aged 22)	N/A
D	Oskar Schmidt	December 7, 1908 (aged 27)	N/A
F	Bibi Torriani (C)	January 10, 1911 (aged 25)	(Switzerland) HC Davos

== United States ==
Head coach: Albert Prettyman

Pos.	Name	Birthdate	Team
D/F	John Garrison	February 13, 1909 (aged 26)	N/A
F	Fred Kammer	June 3, 1912 (aged 23)	N/A
D	Phil LaBatte	July 12, 1911 (aged 24)	N/A
F	John Lax	July 23, 1911 (aged 24)	N/A
G	Tom Moone	November 6, 1908 (aged 27)	N/A
F	Elbridge Ross	August 2, 1909 (aged 26)	N/A
F	Paul Rowe	May 5, 1914 (aged 21)	N/A
D	Frank Shaughnessy	June 21, 1911 (aged 24)	N/A
F	Gordon Smith	February 14, 1908 (aged 27)	N/A
F	Francis Spain	February 17, 1909 (aged 26)	N/A
F	Frank Stubbs	July 12, 1909 (aged 26)	N/A

== Sources ==
- Duplacey, James (1998). Total Hockey: The official encyclopedia of the National Hockey League. Total Sports. ISBN 0-8362-7114-9.
- Podnieks, Andrew (2010). IIHF Media Guide & Record Book 2011. Moydart Pres.
- Hockey Hall Of Fame page on the 1936 Olympics
- Wallechinsky, David (1988). The Complete Book of the Olympics. Penguin Books. pp. 614. ISBN 0-14-010771-1.
