= Germany at the 1936 Winter Olympics =

- IOC code: GER
- NOC: German Olympic Committee

in Garmisch-Partenkirchen
- Competitors: 55 (48 men, 7 women) in 8 sports
- Flag bearer: Georg von Kaufmann (Cross-country)
- Medals Ranked 2nd: Gold 3 Silver 3 Bronze 0 Total 6

Winter Olympics appearances (overview)
- 1928; 1932; 1936; 1948; 1952; 1956–1988; 1992; 1994; 1998; 2002; 2006; 2010; 2014; 2018; 2022; 2026

Other related appearances
- United Team of Germany (1956–1964); East Germany (1968–1988); West Germany (1968–1988)

Germany was the host nation at the 1936 Winter Olympics in Garmisch-Partenkirchen. The country placed second in the medal standings.

== Medalists ==
Medal	Name	Sport	Event
Gold	Franz Pfnür	Alpine skiing	Men's combined
Gold	Christl Cranz	Alpine skiing	Women's combined
Gold	Maxi Herber; Ernst Baier	Figure skating	Pairs
Silver	Gustav Lantschner	Alpine skiing	Men's combined
Silver	Käthe Grasegger	Alpine skiing	Women's combined
Silver	Ernst Baier	Figure skating	Men's singles

== Alpine skiing ==
Men

Athlete	Event	Downhill		Slalom			Total	
Athlete	Event	Time	Rank	Time 1	Time 2	Rank	Total points	Rank
Rudi Cranz	Combined	5:04.0	8	1:32.9 (+0:12)	1:14.6	4	91.03	6
Roman Wörndle	Combined	5:01.2	6	1:22.9	1:25.8 (+0:06)	5	91.16	5
Gustav Lantschner	Combined	4:58.2	3	1:16.9	1:15.6	2	96.26	2nd place, silver medalist(s)
Franz Pfnür	Combined	4:51.8	2	1:12.1	1:14.5	1	99.25	1st place, gold medalist(s)

Women

Athlete	Event	Downhill		Slalom			Total	
Athlete	Event	Time	Rank	Time 1	Time 2	Rank	Total points	Rank
Christl Cranz	Combined	5:23.4	6	1:12.0	1:10.1	1	97.06	1st place, gold medalist(s)
Hadi Pfeifer	Combined	5:21.6	5	1:20.8	1:18.8	4	91.85	5
Käthe Grasegger	Combined	5:11.0	3	1:16.0	1:17.4	2	95.26	2nd place, silver medalist(s)
Lisa Resch	Combined	5:08.4	2	1:37.5 (+0:06)	1:22.9	8	88.74	6

== Bobsleigh ==
Sled	Athletes	Event	Run 1		Run 2		Run 3		Run 4		Total	
Sled	Athletes	Event	Time	Rank	Time	Rank	Time	Rank	Time	Rank	Time	Rank
GER-1	Hanns Kilian; Hermann von Valta	Two-man	1:27.29	7	1:24.24	8	1:26.63	7	1:23.85	8	5:42.01	5
GER-2	Fritz Grau; Albert Brehme	Two-man	1:30.66	12	1:23.33	4	1:26.94	8	1:23.78	6	5:44.71	6

Sled	Athletes	Event	Run 1		Run 2		Run 3		Run 4		Total	
Sled	Athletes	Event	Time	Rank	Time	Rank	Time	Rank	Time	Rank	Time	Rank
GER-1	Hanns Kilian; Sebastian Huber; Fritz Schwarz; Hermann von Valta	Four-man	1:20.73	1	1:23.05	8	1:24.09	10	1:21.20	9	5:29.07	7
GER-2	Walter Trott; Fritz Vonhof; Wolfgang Kummer; Rudolf Werlich	Four-man	DNF	–	–	–	–	–	–	–	DNF	–

== Cross-country skiing ==
Men

Event	Athlete	Race	
Event	Athlete	Time	Rank
18 km	Friedl Däuber	1'24:57	29
18 km	Toni Zeller	1'24:32	27
18 km	Georg von Kaufmann	1'22:39	20
18 km	Walter Motz	1'21:20	18
50 km	Erich Marx	4'25:48	32
50 km	Josef Ponn	4'13:12	30
50 km	Fritz Gaiser	4'05:44	25
50 km	Matthias Wörndle	4'03:33	24

Men's 4 x 10 km relay

Athletes	Race	
Athletes	Time	Rank
Friedl Däuber; Willy Bogner; Herbert Leupold; Toni Zeller	2'54:54	6

== Figure skating ==
Men

Athlete	Event	CF	FS	Places	Points	Final rank
Günther Lorenz	Men's singles	19	12	119	343.5	18
Ernst Baier	Men's singles	3	4	24	400.8	2nd place, silver medalist(s)

Women

Athlete	Event	CF	FS	Places	Points	Final rank
Herta Frey-Dexler	Women's singles	17	19	129	345.4	19
Victoria Lindpaintner	Women's singles	7	10	51	381.4	8

Pairs

Athletes	Points	Score	Final rank
Eva Prawitz; Otto Weiß	74.5	9.5	8
Maxi Herber; Ernst Baier	11	11.5	1st place, gold medalist(s)

== Ice hockey ==
=== Group B ===
Top two teams advanced to semifinals

	Pld	W	L	T	GF	GA	Pts
Germany	3	2	1	0	5	1	4
United States	3	2	1	0	5	2	4
Italy	3	1	2	0	2	5	2
Switzerland	3	1	2	0	1	5	2

6 February	Germany	0-1 (0-1,0-0,0-0)	United States
7 February	Germany	3-0 (1-0,1-0,1-0)	Italy
8 February	Germany	2-0 (0-0,1-0,1-0)	Switzerland

=== Group A ===
Top two teams advanced to Medal Round.

	Pld	W	L	T	GF	GA	Pts
Great Britain	3	2	0	1	8	3	5
Canada	3	2	1	0	22	4	4
Germany	3	1	1	1	5	8	3
Hungary	3	0	3	0	2	22	0

11 February	Germany	2-1 (0-0,1-0,1-1)	Hungary
12 February	Germany	1-1 (0-0,0-1,1-0,0-0)	Great Britain
13 February	Germany	2-6 (0-1,0-3,2-2)	Canada

Contestants; Wilhelm Egginger; Joachim Albrecht von Bethmann Hollweg; Gustav Jaenecke; Philipp Schenk; Rudi Ball; Karl Kögel; Toni Wiedemann; Herbert Schibukat; Alois Kuhn; Werner George; Georg Strobl; Paul Trautmann

== Nordic combined ==
Events:

- 18 km cross-country skiing
- normal hill ski jumping

The cross-country skiing part of this event was combined with the main medal event of cross-country skiing. Those results can be found above in this article in the cross-country skiing section. Some athletes (but not all) entered in both the cross-country skiing and Nordic combined event, their time on the 18 km was used for both events.

The ski jumping (normal hill) event was held separate from the main medal event of ski jumping, results can be found in the table below.

Athlete	Event	Cross-country			Ski Jumping				Total	
Athlete	Event	Time	Points	Rank	Distance 1	Distance 2	Total points	Rank	Points	Rank
Toni Eisgruber	Individual	1'31:38	152.8	37	51.5	49.0	212.1	2	364.9	23
Friedl Wagner	Individual	1'24:33	189.2	12	40.0	46.0	182.7	27	371.9	18
Josef Gumpold	Individual	1'24:19	190.4	11	45.0	46.0	190.3	16	380.7	13
Willy Bogner	Individual	1'24:11	191.2	10	45.0	49.0	190.3	16	381.5	12

== Ski jumping ==
Athlete	Event	Jump 1			Jump 2			Total	
Athlete	Event	Distance	Points	Rank	Distance	Points	Rank	Points	Rank
Franz Haslberger	Normal hill	64.0	100.4	24	67.0	104.2	17	204.6	17
Paul Krauß	Normal hill	62.5	101.7	20	62.5	102.7	19	204.4	18
Kurt Körner	Normal hill	70.0	104.8	14	71.5	104.5	16	209.3	12
Hans Marr	Normal hill	71.5	107.0	12	69.0	107.2	8	214.2	10

== Speed skating ==
Men

Event	Athlete	Race	
Event	Athlete	Time	Rank
500 m	Heinz Sames	47.0	28
500 m	Willi Sandner	46.2	19
1500 m	Heinz Sames	2:29.3	27
1500 m	Willi Sandner	2:25.3	16
5000 m	Willi Sandner	DNF	–
5000 m	Heinz Sames	8:48.5	13
10,000 m	Heinz Sames	18:04.3	15
10,000 m	Willi Sandner	18:02.0	12
