= List of Olympic men's ice hockey players for Germany =

The list of Olympic men's ice hockey players for Germany consisted of 161 skaters and 20 goaltenders. Men's ice hockey tournaments have been staged at the Olympic Games since 1920 (it was introduced at the 1920 Summer Olympics, and was permanently added to the Winter Olympic Games in 1924). Germany has participated in six tournaments, the first in 1928 and the most recent in 2018. Between 1968 and 1988 Germany was divided at the Olympics, and both West Germany and East Germany sent separate teams. Germany's best finish is second overall, winning a silver medal at the 2018 Winter Olympics, while their lowest finish was eleventh place in 2010.

Markus Egen has scored the most goals, 14, and points, 16, while Thomas Brandl has the most assists with 6. Both Christian Ehrhoff and Stefan Ustorf Udo Kiessling have competed in the most Olympics, appearing in four tournaments with Germany, with Ustorf playing the most games, with 24.

Seven players, Rudi Ball, Dieter Hegen, Gustav Jaenecke, Udo Kiessling, Uwe Krupp, Hans Rampf, and Xaver Unsinn have been inducted into the International Ice Hockey Federation Hall of Fame, though Unsinn was inducted as a builder.

== Key ==
General terms
Term	Definition
GP	Games played
IIHFHOF	International Ice Hockey Federation Hall of Fame
Olympics	Number of Olympic Games tournaments
Ref(s)	Reference(s)

Goaltender statistical abbreviations
Abbreviation	Definition
W	Wins
L	Losses
T	Ties
Min	Minutes played
SO	Shutouts
GA	Goals against
GAA	Goals against average

Skater statistical abbreviations
Abbreviation	Definition
G	Goals
A	Assists
P	Points
PIM	Penalty minutes

== Goaltenders ==
Goaltenders
Player	Olympics	Tournament(s)	GP	W	L	T	Min	SO	GA	GAA	Medals	Notes	Ref(s)
Danny aus den Birken	1	2018	6	4	2	0	376	0	17	2.71	Bronze (2018)		
Helmut de Raaf	2	1992, 1994	7	3	3	1	–	0	19	–		1988	
Wilhelm Egginger	1	1936	6	3	2	1	–	–	–	–			
Karl Friesen	1	1992	1	0	1	0	–	0	5	–		1984, 1988	
Thomas Greiss	2	2006, 2010	4	0	4	0	239	0	20	–			
Josef Heiß	3	1992, 1994, 1998	7	3	4	0	–	0	23	–			
Michael Hobelsberger	2	1960, 1964	9	2	7	0	64	0	–	–			
Alfred Hoffmann	2	1952, 1956	10	2	6	2	–	–	–	–			
Ulli Jansen	3	1956, 1960, 1964	13	4	8	1	–	–	–	–			
Olaf Kölzig	2	1998, 2006	5	2	1	2	299	1	12	2.41			
Christian Künast	1	2002	2	0	2	0	–	0	7	–			
Walter Leinweber	1	1932	6	2	4	0	–	–	–	–	Bronze (1932)		
Klaus Merk	2	1994, 1998	3	2	1	0	–	0	13	–			
Robert Müller	2	2002, 2006	3	0	3	0	–	0	6	–			
Dimitri Pätzold	1	2010	1	0	1	0	60	0	5	5.00			
Timo Pielmeier	1	2018	1	0	1	0	58	0	1	1.03	Silver (2018)		
Fritz Rammelmayr	1	1928	2	0	1	1	–	–	–	–			
Marc Seliger	1	2002	6	3	3	0	–	0	15	–			
Alfred Steinke	1	1928	2	0	1	1	–	–	–	–			
Heinz Wackers	1	1952	5	0	4	1	–	–	–	–			

== Skaters ==
Skaters
Player	Olympics	Tournaments	GP	G	A	P	PIM	Medals	Notes	Ref(s)
Tobias Abstreiter	1	2002	7	2	0	2	2			
Sinan Akdag	1	2018	2	0	0	0	0	Silver (2018)		
Rick Amann	2	1992, 1994	16	0	2	2	8			
Paul Ambros	3	1956, 1960, 1964	22	0	0	0	28			
Michael Bakos	1	2010	4	0	0	0	0			
Rudi Ball	2	1932, 1936	10	5	2	7	6	Bronze (1932)	IIHFHOF (2004)	
Alexander Barta	1	2006	5	0	0	0	4			
Martin Beck	1	1956	8	0	0	0	8			
Jan Benda	3	1994, 1998, 2002	19	4	1	5	16			
Brad Bergen	1	1998	3	1	1	2	0			
Anton Biersack	1	1956	4	0	0	0	4			
Karl Bierschel	2	1952, 1956	13	0	0	0	2			
Tino Boos	1	2006	5	2	1	3	7			
Daryl Boyle	1	2018	7	0	1	1	2	Silver (2018)		
Thomas Brandl	3	1992, 1994, 1998	19	1	6	7	22			
Andreas Brockmann	1	1992	8	3	2	5	2			
Lars Brüggemann	1	1998	4	0	1	1	0			
Florian Busch	1	2006	5	0	0	0	6			
Sven Butenschon	1	2010	4	0	0	0	2			
Benoit Doucet	2	1994, 1998	12	3	0	3	23			
Peter Draisaitl	2	1992, 1998	12	4	2	6	10		1988	
Georg Eberl	1	1960	7	1	2	3	2			
Markus Egen	3	1952, 1956, 1960	21	14	2	16	14			
Ernst Eggerbauer	1	1960	7	0	0	0	4			
Yasin Ehliz	1	2018	7	0	3	3	6	Silver (2018)		
Christian Ehrhoff	4	2002, 2006, 2010, 2018	23	2	2	4	26	Silver (2018)		
Artur Endreß	1	1956	8	1	0	1	4			
Gerrit Fauser	1	2018	7	0	0	0	0	Silver (2018)		
Sven Felski	2	2006, 2010	9	2	0	2	6			
Petr Fical	1	2006	5	0	0	0	4			
Jakub Ficenec	1	2010	4	0	0	0	4			
Ron Fischer	1	1992	8	1	3	4	4		1988	
Georg Franz	1	1994	8	0	1	1	4		1988	
Sebastian Furchner	1	2006	1	0	0	0	0			
Werner George	1	1936	2	0	1	1	0			
Marcel Goc	3	2006, 2010, 2018	16	3	2	5	0	Silver (2018)		
Sascha Goc	1	2006	5	0	0	0	10			
Erich Goldmann	2	1998, 2002	11	0	1	1	54			
Thomas Greilinger	1	2010	4	0	0	0	2			
Bruno Guttowski	1	1956	6	1	0	1	8			
Patrick Hager	1	2018	7	3	4	7	4	Silver (2018)		
Jörg Handrick	1	1994	8	1	2	3	0			
Jochen Hecht	3	1998, 2002, 2010	12	2	2	4	10			
Dieter Hegen	3	1992, 1994, 1998	19	7	4	11	10		IIHFHOF (2010); 1984, 1988	
Mike Heidt	1	1992	8	0	1	1	6			
Alfred Heinrich	1	1932	6	0	0	0	18	Bronze (1932)		
Erich Herker	1	1932	2	1	0	1	0	Bronze (1932)		
Bernd Herzig	1	1964	6	0	0	0	0			
Uli Hiemer	2	1992, 1994	14	0	1	1	12		1984	
Raimund Hilger	2	1992, 1994	13	2	1	3	4			
Engelbert Holderied	1	1952	2	0	0	0	0			
Korbinian Holzer	1	2010	4	0	0	0	2			
Georg Holzmann	1	1992	8	1	2	3	6		1988	
Frank Hördler	1	2018	7	1	2	3	4	Silver (2018)		
Kai Hospelt	1	2010	4	0	1	1	2			
Hans Huber	2	1956, 1960	15	4	0	4	2			
Wayne Hynes	1	2002	7	0	0	0	6			
Gustav Jaenecke	3	1928, 1932, 1936	14	4	0	4	6	Bronze (1932)	IIHFHOF (1998)	
Günter Jochems	1	1956	7	0	0	0	0			
Dominik Kahun	1	2018	7	2	3	5	20	Silver (2018)		
Axel Kammerer	1	1992	8	0	0	0	6			
Klaus Kathan	2	2002, 2006	12	3	2	5	2			
Torsten Kienass	1	1992	8	0	0	0	6		1976, 1980, 1084, 1988	
Udo Kiessling	1	1968, 1972	11	0	1	1	12		IIHFHOF (2000); 1960, 1964	
Marcus Kink	1	2018	7	0	1	1	0	Silver (2018)		
Wolfgang Kittel	1	1928	1	0	0	0	0			
Manuel Klinge	1	2010	4	1	0	1	0			
Karl Kögel	1	1936	6	0	0	0	4			
Ernst Köpf Sr.	1	1964	8	2	2	4	14		1968, 1976	
Ernst Köpf Jr.	1	1992	8	3	1	4	0			
Lasse Kopitz	1	2006	4	0	0	0	0			
Werner Korff	1	1932	6	0	1	1	2	Bronze (1932)		
Reiner Kossmann	1	1956	4	0	0	0	0			
Franz Kreisel	1	1928	2	0	0	0	0			
Walter Kremershof	1	1952	8	5	1	6	0			
Daniel Kreutzer	2	2002, 2006	12	0	2	2	2			
Björn Krupp	1	2018	7	0	0	0	0	Silver (2018)		
Uwe Krupp	1	1998	2	0	1	1	4		IIHFHOF (2017)	
Alois Kuhn	1	1936	3	0	0	0	0			
Ludwig Kuhn	1	1952	7	0	0	0	0			
Wolfgang Kummer	1	1994	8	2	0	2	10			
Daniel Kunce	2	1998, 2002	10	1	1	2	45			
Rob Leask	1	2006	5	0	0	0	6			
Eduard Lewandowski	1	2006	5	0	2	2	0			
Albert Loibl	1	1964	6	0	0	0	0			
Andreas Loth	1	2002	7	2	0	2	0			
Mirco Lüdemann	3	1994, 1998, 2002	12	1	2	3	0			
Andreas Lupzig	1	1988	4	0	0	0	2			
Brooks Macek	1	2018	7	2	2	4	2	Silver (2018)		
Mark MacKay	2	1998, 2002	11	1	5	6	8			
Tomas Martinec	1	2006	5	1	0	1	2			
Frank Mauer	1	2018	6	1	3	4	2	Silver (2018)		
Jörg Mayr	3	1992, 1994, 2002	17	1	2	3	2			
Jayson Meyer	1	1994	8	0	1	1	8			
Jochen Molling	1	1998	4	0	0	0	4			
Andreas Morczinietz	2	2002	3	0	2	2	0			
Jonas Müller	1	2018	5	1	0	1	2	Silver (2018)		
Marcel Müller	1	2010	4	0	2	2	12			
Moritz Müller	1	2018	7	0	0	0	0	Silver (2018)		
T. J. Mulock	1	2010	4	0	0	0	2			
Andreas Niederberger	2	1992, 1994	16	0	2	2	4		1984, 1988	
Dieter Niess	1	1952	8	0	1	1	0			
Marcel Noebels	1	2018	7	1	0	1	2	Silver (2018)		
Hans Pescher	1	1952	8	0	0	0	0			
Leonhard Pföderl	1	2018	3	1	0	1	0	Silver (2018)		
Rudolf Pittrich	1	1956	6	1	1	2	0			
Matthias Plachta	1	2018	7	1	1	2	4	Silver (2018)		
Fritz Poitsch	1	1952	8	4	0	4	0			
Reemt Pyka	1	1998	4	0	0	0	0			
Fritz Rammelmayr	1	1928	2	0	0	0	0			
Hans Rampf	2	1960, 1960	14	2	1	3	15		IIHFHOF (2001)	
André Rankel	1	2010	4	0	1	1	0			
Martin Reichel	1	2002	7	1	0	1	0			
Sepp Reif	2	1960, 1964	15	1	1	2	6		1968	
Patrick Reimer	1	2018	5	1	0	1	4	Silver (2018)		
Andreas Renz	2	2002, 2006	12	0	0	0	2			
Erich Römer	2	1928, 1932	8	0	0	0	2	Bronze (1932)		
Jürgen Rumrich	3	1992, 1998, 2002	19	2	1	3	2			
Michael Rumrich	2	1992, 1994	16	5	1	6	10			
Walter Sachs	1	1928	1	0	0	0	0			
Stefan Schauer	1	2006	5	0	0	0	4			
Philipp Schenk	1	1936	4	0	0	0	0			
Herbert Schibukat	2	1936, 1952	14	1	0	1	4			
Hans Schmid	1	1928	2	0	0	0	0			
Chris Schmidt	1	2010	4	0	1	1	2			
Mike Schmidt	1	1992	3	0	0	0	0			
Otto Schneitberger	2	1960, 1964	14	1	1	2	8		1968, 1972	
Georg Scholz	1	1964	8	0	1	1	2			
Martin Schröttle	2	1928, 1932	6	1	0	1	0	Bronze (1932)		
Christoph Schubert	2	2002, 2006	12	0	2	2	8			
Siegfried Schubert	2	1960, 1964	13	3	2	5	8			
Horst Schuldes	2	1960, 1964	14	1	1	2	10			
Felix Schütz	1	2018	7	1	2	3	10	Silver (2018)		
Peter Schwimmbeck	1	1964	7	0	0	0	4			
Dennis Seidenberg	3	2002, 2006, 2010	16	2	1	3	12			
Yannic Seidenberg	1	2018	7	1	0	1	4	Silver (2018)		
Kurt Sepp	3	1956, 1960, 1964	18	7	2	9	8			
Alexander Serikow	1	1994	6	0	1	1	0			
Marquardt Slevogt	2	1928, 1932	7	0	0	0	2	Bronze (1932)		
Len Soccio	1	2002	7	3	3	6	8			
Leo Stefan	1	1994	8	3	1	4	4			
Georg Strobl	2	1932, 1936	9	2	0	2	4	Bronze (1932)		
Marco Sturm	3	1998, 2002, 2010	11	0	2	2	0			
Alexander Sulzer	2	2006, 2010	9	0	1	1	6			
Paul Trautmann	1	1936	2	0	0	0	0			
Ernst Trautwein	3	1956, 1960, 1964	22	4	5	9	2			
John Tripp	1	2010	4	1	0	1	2			
Bernd Truntschka	2	1992, 1994	12	3	0	3	10		1988	
Gerd Truntschka	1	1992	7	2	5	7	4		1980, 1984, 1988	
Xaver Unsinn	2	1952, 1960	14	1	2	3	2		IIHFHOF (1998)	
Stefan Ustorf	4	1994, 1998, 2002, 2006	24	3	4	7	4			
Joachim von Bethmann-Hollweg	1	1992	6	1	0	1	0			
Sylvester Wackerle	1	1964	8	2	0	2	4			
Leonhard Waitl	2	1960, 1964	14	2	0	2	26	1968	1968	
Toni Wiedemann	1	1936	6	1	0	1	2			
Markus Wieland	1	1998	4	0	2	2	6			
Karl Wild	1	1952	8	0	0	0	0			
David Wolf	1	2018	7	0	2	2	2	Silver (2018)		
Michael Wolf	1	2010	4	0	0	0	2			
Martin Zach	1	1956	7	0	0	0	0			
Helmut Zanghellini	1	1964	8	1	0	1	0			

== Bibliography ==
- International Ice Hockey Federation, IIHF Hall of Fame, International Ice Hockey Federation
- Podnieks, Andrew (1997), Canada's Olympic Hockey Teams: The Complete History, 1920–1998, Toronto: Doubleday Canada, ISBN 0-385-25688-4
- Podnieks, Andrew, ed. (2010), IIHF Media Guide & Record Book 2011, Toronto: Moydart Press
- Podnieks, Andrew; Szemberg, Szymon (2008), IIHF Top 100 Hockey Stories of All-Time, H. B. Fenn & Company, Ltd., ISBN 978-1-55168-358-4
- Szemberg, Szymon; Podnieks, Andrew, eds. (2007), World of Hockey: Celebrating a Century of the IIHF, Bolton, Ontario: Fenn Publishing, ISBN 978-1-55168-307-2
