= Heikkinen =

- Language: Finnish

Origin
- Region of origin: Finland

Other names
- Variant form: Heikki

Heikkinen is the eighth most common Finnish surname. Notable people with the surname include:

- Aki Heikkinen (born 1980), Finnish decathlete
- Ari Heikkinen, multiple people
- Arseni Heikkinen (born 1957), Finnish bishop
- Benjamin Heikkinen (born 2002), Finnish football midfielder
- Daniel Heikkinen (born 2002), Finnish footballer
- Eemeli Heikkinen (born 1994), Finnish ice hockey player
- Frans Heikkinen (1906–1943), Finnish cross country skier
- Hannakaisa Heikkinen (born 1974), Finnish politician
- Henna Heikkinen (born 1988), Finnish singer from Idols Finland 2
- Ida Heikkinen (born 2006), Finnish football
- Ilkka Heikkinen (born 1984), Finnish ice hockey player
- Janne Heikkinen, multiple people
- Juho Heikkinen (1863–1938), Finnish farmer and politician
- Jussi Heikkinen (born 1988), Finnish football (soccer) player
- Kalevi Heikkinen (1911–1940), Finnish member of the Lapua movement
- Kalle Heikkinen (1908–1938), Finnish cross-country skier
- Kasperi Heikkinen (born 1980), guitar player, member of Amberian Dawn
- Kauko Heikkinen (born 1938), Finnish gymnast
- Kirsi Heikkinen (born 1978), Finnish football referee
- Leo Heikkinen (1917–1999), American businessman
- Marjaana Heikkinen (born 1967), Finnish Paralympic athlete
- Markus Heikkinen (born 1978), Finnish footballer
- Matti Heikkinen (born 1983), Finnish cross country skier
- Mikko Heikkinen (born 1949), Finnish architect
- Mirjami Heikkinen, Finnish voice actress
- Olavi Heikkinen (born 1944), Finnish sports shooter
- Pekka Heikkinen (1883–1959), Finnish farmer and politician
- Ralph Heikkinen (1917–1990), American football player
- Timo-Pekka Heikkinen (born 1985), Finnish ice hockey player
- Toomas Heikkinen (born 1991), Finnish rally-cross and ice-racing driver

== See also ==
- Heikkinen – Komonen Architects (est. 1974), Finnish architectural firm
