= Hirano (disambiguation) =

Hirano is a former Japanese city and a district in Hirano-ku, Osaka.

Hirano may refer to:

== Places ==
- Hirano-ku, Osaka, a ward of Osaka City
- Hirano Shrine, a Shinto shrine in the city of Kyoto

== Surname ==
- Hirano (surname)

== Railway stations ==
- Hirano Station (Fukushima)
- Hirano Station (Hyogo)
- Hirano Station (JR West)
- Hirano Station (Osaka Municipal Subway)
- Hirano Station (Nankai)

== Other ==
- Hirano body, intracellular aggregates hypothesized to be involved in neurological disorders
