= Andrzej Wołkowski =

Polish ice hockey player (1913–1995)

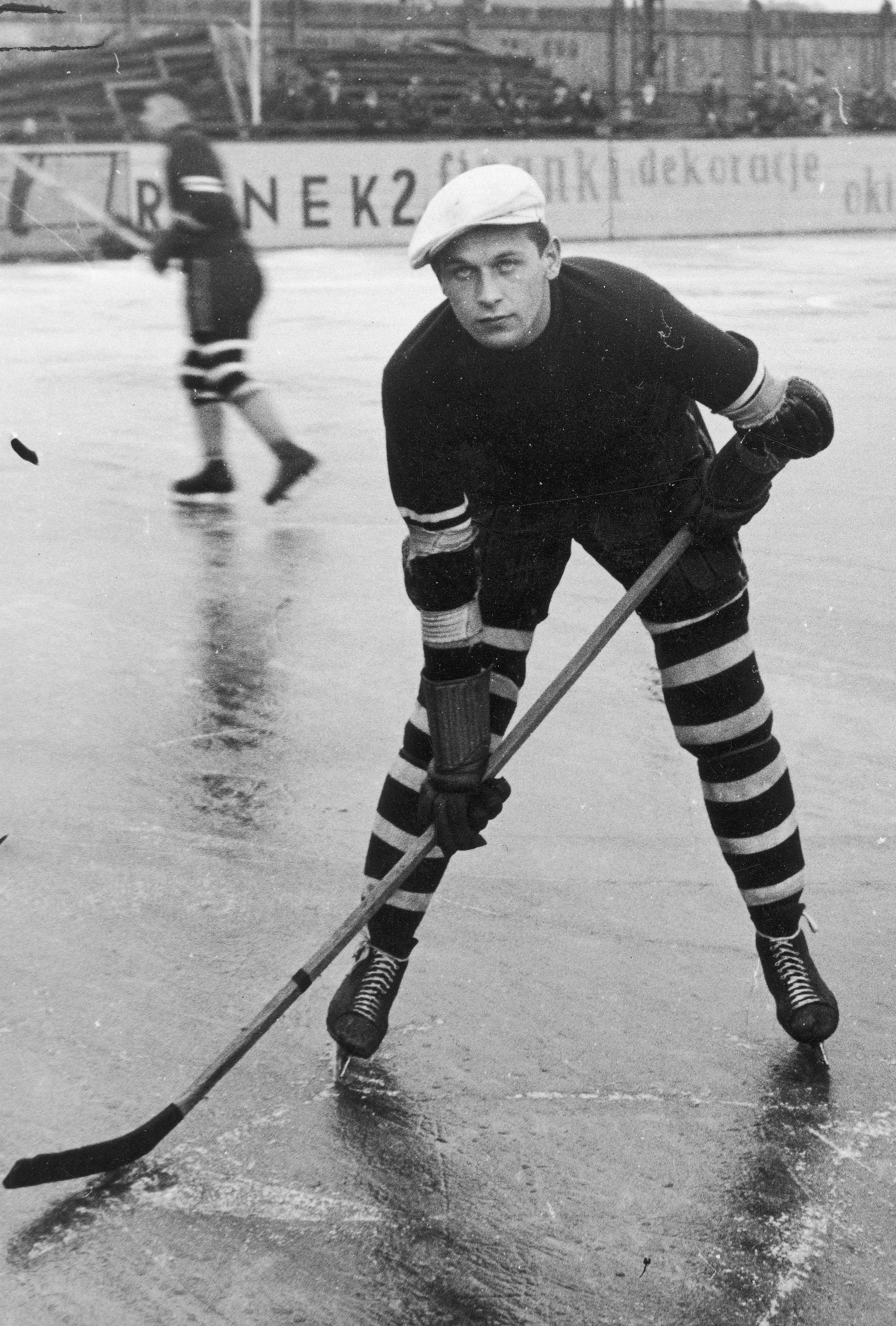
- Born: February 14, 1913; Kraków, Austria-Hungary
- Died: March 4, 1995 (aged 82); Kraków, Poland
- Height: 6 ft 0 in (183 cm)
- Weight: 174 lb (79 kg; 12 st 6 lb)
- Position: Centre
- Shot: Right
- Played for: Sokół Kraków; Cracovia; Ogniwo Krakow; Gwardia Kraków; Sparta Nowy Targ
- National team: Poland
- Playing career: 1929–1939; 1946–1958

Andrzej Karol Wołkowski (14 February 1913 – 4 March 1995), was a Polish ice hockey player. He played for Sokół Kraków, Cracovia, Ogniwo Kraków, Gwardia Kraków, and Sparta Nowy Targ during his career. With Cracovia Wołkowski won the Polish league championship three times, in 1937, 1946, and 1947. He also played for the Polish national team at the 1936 Winter Olympics, and multiple World Championships. After his playing career, he became a coach, winning the 1965 Polish league championship with Podhale Nowy Targ. He was also awarded the Knight's Cross of the Order of Polonia Restituta.
