= Hirano (surname) =

Hirano (平野, the kanji character 平 is for "flat, plain, calm" and the kanji character 野 is for "field") is a Japanese surname.

The same combination of kanji characters read as "Heiya" can mean a plain, a flat land, or the city name of Hirano.

People named Hirano include:

- Asao Hirano (1926–2019), Japanese physician, academic, medical researcher and neuropathology professor
- Aya Hirano (平野綾, born 1987), Japanese voice actress and singer
- Ayumu Hirano (平野歩夢, born 1998), Japanese Olympic snowboarder and skateboarder
- Fumi Hirano (平野文) (born 1955), Japanese voice actress, singer and essayist
- Irene Hirano (1948–2020), founding President of the U.S.-Japan Council
- Jorge Hirano (ホルヘ・ヒラノ) (born 1956), Peruvian footballer
- Ken Hirano (平野謙 (評論家), 1910–1978), Japanese literary critic
- Kaishu Hirano (born 2002), Japanese snowboarder
- Keiichiro Hirano (平野啓一郎, born 1975), Japanese novelist
- Kouta Hirano (平野耕太, born 1973), Japanese manga artist
- Masaaki Hirano (平野雅章, 1931–2008), Japanese food historian
- Miu Hirano (table tennis player) (ja:平野美宇｜平野美宇, born 2000), Japanese table tennis player
- Motoharu Hirano (平野 元治; born 1940), Japanese sport shooter
- Hirano Nagayasu (平野長泰, 1559–1628), Japanese Samurai
- Nobutaka Hirano (平野信孝, born 1972), Japanese volleyball player
- Remi Hirano (平野レミ, born 1947), Japanese cooking enthusiast, TV persona and singer
- Ryoichi Hirano (平野 亮; born 1983/84), Japanese ballet dancer
- Sayaka Hirano (平野早矢香, born 1985), Japanese table tennis player
- Susumu Hirano (平野 進; 1910—?), Japanese ice hockey player
- Toshiki Hirano (平野俊貴, born 1956), Japanese anime director, animator, and character designer
- Tsukasa Hirano (平野司; born 1983), Japanese triathlete
- Yoshihisa Hirano (平野義久, born 1971), Japanese composer and arranger
- Yoshihisa Hirano (baseball) (平野佳寿, born 1984), Japanese baseball player
- Yoshiko Hirano (世志琥, born 1993), Japanese professional wrestler
- Yuichi Hirano (平野佑一, born 1996), Japanese footballer
- Yuka Hirano (平野 由佳; born 1987), Japanese ice hockey player
