= Otto Heller (disambiguation) =

Otto Heller (1896–1970) was a Czech cinematographer.

Otto Heller may also refer to:

- Otto Heller (author) (1863–1941), author and academic
- Otto Heller (ice hockey) (1914–?), Swiss ice hockey player
