= Adam Kowalski (ice hockey) =

Polish ice hockey player (1912–1971)

- Born: 19 December 1912; Stanisławów, Austria-Hungary
- Died: 9 December 1971 (aged 58); Kraków, Poland
- Height: 5 ft 9 in (175 cm)
- Weight: 159 lb (72 kg; 11 st 5 lb)
- Position: Centre
- Played for: Cracovia
- National team: Poland
- Playing career: 1928–1939; 1945–1951

Adam Kowalski (19 December 1912 – 9 December 1971) was a Polish athlete. As an ice hockey player he played for Cracovia. With Cracovia he won the Polish league championship three times, in 1937, 1946, and 1947. He also played for the Polish national team at the 1932, 1936 and 1948 Winter Olympics and four world championships: 1935, 1937, 1938, and 1939. He died in 1971 in Kraków.

Kowalski fought in Poland's defense during the German invasion of Poland at the start of World War II in September 1939. He was taken prisoner by the Germans probably on 21 September 1939 in Lubliniec, and afterwards, he was held in the Oflag XI-B and Oflag II-C prisoner-of-war camps.
