= Cross-country skiing at the 1936 Winter Olympics – Men's 50 kilometre =

Men's 50 kilometres at the IV Olympic Winter Games
- Date: February 15, 1936
- Competitors: 36 from 11 nations
- Winning time: 3:30:11

Medalists
1st place, gold medalist(s)		Elis Wiklund	Sweden
2nd place, silver medalist(s)		Axel Wikström	Sweden
3rd place, bronze medalist(s)		Nils-Joel Englund	Sweden

The 50 kilometre cross-country skiing event was part of the cross-country skiing at the 1936 Winter Olympics programme. It was the fourth appear]ance of the event. The competition was held on Saturday, 15 February 1936. Thirty-six cross-country skiers from eleven nations competed.

== Medalists ==
Gold	Silver	Bronze
Elis Wiklund; Sweden	Axel Wikström; Sweden	Nils-Joel Englund; Sweden

== Results ==
Place	Competitor	Time
1	Elis Wiklund (SWE)	3'30:11
2	Axel Wikström (SWE)	3'33:20
3	Nils-Joel Englund (SWE)	3'34:10
4	Hjalmar Bergström (SWE)	3'35:50
5	Klaes Karppinen (FIN)	3'39:33
6	Arne Tuft (NOR)	3'41:18
7	Frans Heikkinen (FIN)	3'42:44
8	Pekka Niemi (FIN)	3'44:14
9	Cyril Musil (TCH)	3'46:12
10	Franc Smolej (YUG)	3'47:40
11	Trygve Brodahl (NOR)	3'50:14
12	Kåre Hatten (NOR)	3'50:37
13	Giovanni Kasebacher (ITA)	3'53:08
14	Kalle Heikkinen (FIN)	3'54:25
15	Jan Svatoš (TCH)	3'54:33
16	Vincenzo Demetz (ITA)	3'56:47
17	Tobia Senoner (ITA)	3'57:16
18	Karl Satre (USA)	3'58:45
19	Vladimír Novák (TCH)	3'59:08
20	Lovro Žemva (YUG)	3'59:13
21	Leon Knap (YUG)	3'59:17
22	Giacomo Scalet (ITA)	4'01:54
23	Vello Kaaristo (EST)	4'02:52
24	Matthias Wörndle (GER)	4'03:33
25	Fritz Gaiser (GER)	4'05:44
26	Stanisław Karpiel (POL)	4'06:26
27	Birger Torrissen (USA)	4'07:44
28	Hiroshi Tadano (JPN)	4'10:23
29	Richard E. Parsons (USA)	4'11:08
30	Josef Ponn (GER)	4'13:12
31	Lado Senčar (YUG)	4'20:20
32	Erich Marx (GER)	4'25:48
33	Nils Backstrom (USA)	4'29:30
34	Tadao Okayama (JPN)	4'30:28
–	Per Samuelshaug (NOR)	DNF
–	Lukáš Mihalák (TCH)	DNF
