= Georg Kaufmann =

Georg Kaufmann may refer to:

- Georg von Kaufmann (1907–1972), German skier
- Georg Kaufmann (politician) (born 1955), Liechtenstein politician
