= Jan Svatoš =

Czech cross-country skier

Personal information
- Nationality: Czech
- Born: 7 February 1910

Sport
- Sport: Cross-country skiing

Jan Svatoš (born 7 February 1910, date of death unknown) was a Czech cross-country skier. He competed in the men's 50 kilometre event at the 1936 Winter Olympics. He used to live in Trhanov, his sportclub was Sněhaři Domažlice.
