= Senčar =

Senčar is a Slovene and Croatian surname. Notable people with the surname include:

- Božidar Senčar (1927–1985), Croatian footballer
- David Sencar (born 1984), Austrian footballer
- Lado Senčar (1908–1998), Slovene cross-country skier
- Mojca Senčar (1940–2019), Slovene physician
