= Kozue =

- Gender: Female

Origin
- Origin: Japanese
- Meaning: Different meanings depending on the kanji used

Kozue (written: 梢, こず恵 or こずえ in hiragana) is a feminine Japanese given name.

== People with the name ==
- Kozue Akimoto (秋元 梢; born 1987), Japanese fashion model
- Kozue Amano (天野 こずえ; born 1974), Japanese manga artist
- Kozue Ando (安藤 梢; born 1982), Japanese footballer
- Kozue Kananiwa (金庭 こず恵), Japanese anime producer
- Kozue Kinoshita (木下 梢; 1912–?), Japanese male ice hockey player
- Kozue Yoshizumi (吉住 梢; born 1979), Japanese voice actress

== Fictional characters ==
- Kozue Aoba (蒼葉 梢), a character in the manga series Mahoraba
- Kozue Kaoru (薫梢), a character in the anime series Revolutionary Girl Utena.
- Kozue Kuranaga (倉永 梢), a character in the visual novel Yosuga no Sora
- Kozue Nanao (七尾 こずえ), a character in the anime series Maison Ikkoku
- Kozue Otomune (乙宗 梢), a main character in mobile app Link! Like! Love Live!
- Kozue Takanashi (小鳥遊 梢), a character in the manga series Working!!
- Kozue Matsumoto (松本こずえ), a character in the manga series Baki the Grappler
