= Kitazawa =

Kitazawa (written: 北沢 or 北澤) is a Japanese surname. Notable people with the surname include:

- Ayaka Kitazawa (北沢 綾香, born 1989), Japanese singer
- Ikue Kitazawa (北澤 育恵, born 1996), Japanese curler
- Masatatsu Kitazawa (北沢 正辰, 1916–?), Japanese ice hockey player
- Kitazawa Rakuten (北澤 楽天, 1876–1955), Japanese manga artist and painter
- Toshimi Kitazawa (北澤 俊美, born 1938), Japanese politician
- Tsuyoshi Kitazawa (北澤 豪, born 1968), Japanese footballer
- Yō Kitazawa (北沢 洋, born 1963), Japanese actor and voice actor
- Yoshihiro Kitazawa (北沢 欣浩, born 1962), Japanese speed skater

== Fictional characters ==
- Yuki, Riku, and Yoshiki Kitazawa, characters in the manga series Gravitation
- Hagumi Kitazawa (北沢 はぐみ), a character from the multimedia franchise BanG Dream!

== See also ==
- Higashi-Kitazawa Station
- Kami-Kitazawa Station
