= Hirano body =

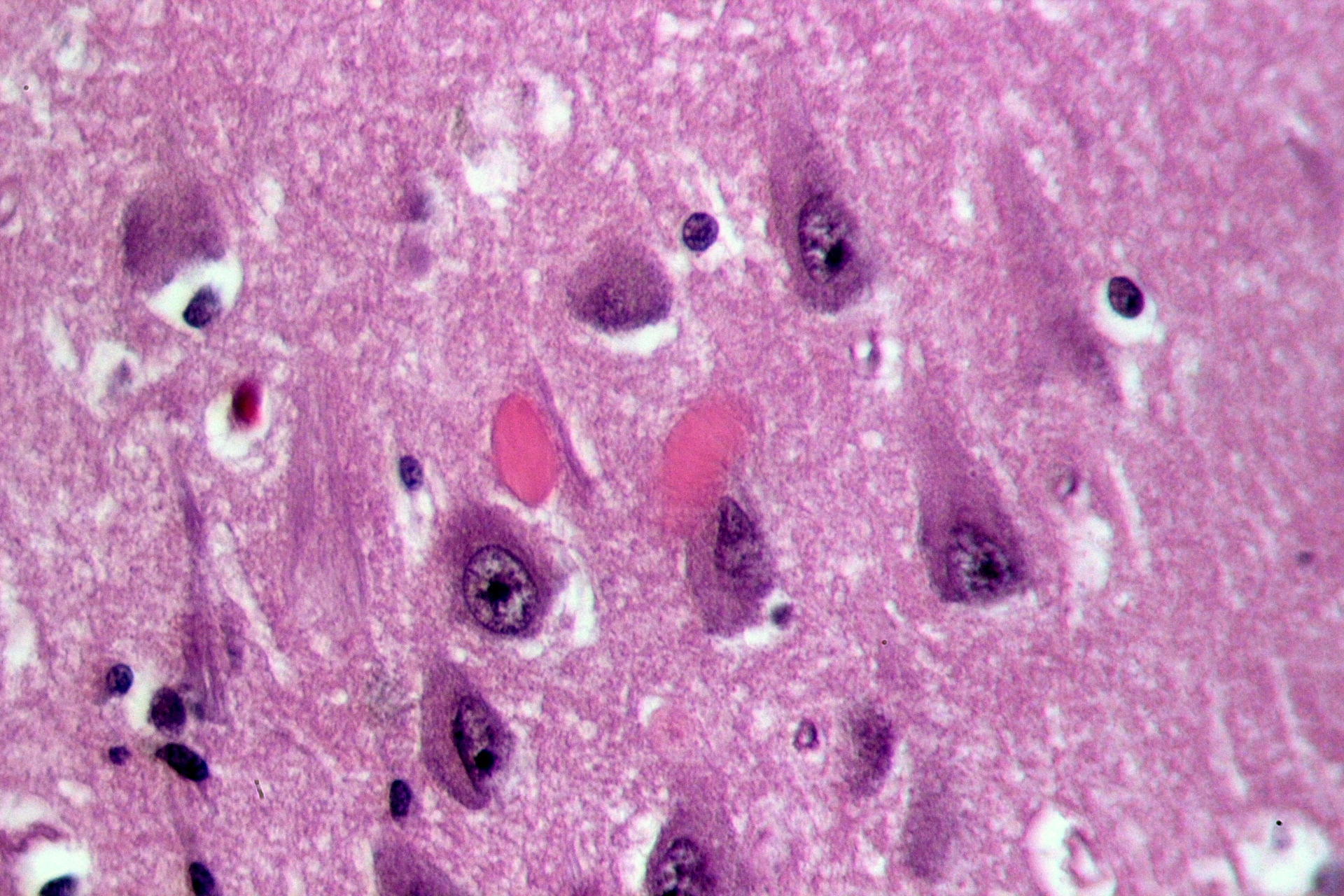
Hirano body as depicted in the histological slide from the Hippocampus of an elderly person with Alzheimer-related pathology. The Hirano body is the lighter pink ovoid in the center field of the image.

Hirano bodies are intracellular aggregates of actin and actin-associated proteins first observed in neurons (nerve cells) by Asao Hirano in 1965. The eponym ‘Hirano bodies’ was not introduced until 1968, by Schochet et al., three years after Hirano first observed the proteins.

Hirano bodies are found in the nerve cells of individuals afflicted with certain neurodegenerative disorders, such as Alzheimer's disease and Creutzfeldt–Jakob disease.

Hirano bodies were first described in the CA1 in patients with amyotrophic lateral sclerosis and parkinsonism-dementia complex (ALS-PDC). Hirano bodies (Hb) are found mostly in the neuronal processes in the pyramidal layer in the Sommer’s sector (CA1) of the hippocampus, mostly arising from age related changes in the microfilament system. Hirano bodies are often described as rod-shaped, crystal-like, and eosinophilic (pink after staining with haematoxylin and eosin). They are frequently seen in hippocampal pyramidal cells. An experimental model of Hirano body formation has been reported, using a genetically altered strain of the slime mold Dictyostelium discoideum.

Hirano bodies have been noted as a function of age without obvious underlying neurodegeneration.

== Alzheimer's disease ==
The Sommer’s sector (CA1) of the hippocampus has been described to be influential in the formation of new memories, as well as, containing inclusion bodies that contribute to a hallmark of Alzheimer’s disease (AD), intellectual deficit. Alzheimer’s neurofibrillary tangles show a preference to form in the CA1, which is one of the major areas in which Hb’s have been observed. There are a larger number of Hb’s found in people with Alzheimer’s disease than those without the disease. Additionally many processes of Alzheimer’s neurofibrillary tangles have been observed to contain Hirano bodies.

Hirano bodies are described as cytoplasmic paracrystalline lattices, which are a main form of a pathological feature seen in a broad spectrum of neurodegenerative diseases, such as Alzheimer’s disease (AD). There is an upregulation of a macroautophagic pathway related to AD that can be related to an actin aggregate thought to be an intermediate in the formation of Hirano bodies. More specifically the actin and actin binding proteins seen in Hirano bodies are a significant feature of an Alzheimer’s disease brain. Additionally, variations in the locational characteristics of β-amyloid precursor proteins seen in Alzheimer’s disease are connected to Hirano bodies. It was observed that Hirano bodies are a specific site of a C-terminal fragment of β-amyloid precursor proteins.
