= Lovro Žemva =

Slovenian cross-country skier

Personal information
- Nationality: Slovenian
- Born: 10 August 1911; Zgornje Gorje, Austria-Hungary
- Died: 27 December 1981 (aged 70)

Sport
- Sport: Cross-country skiing

Lovro Žemva (10 August 1911 – 27 December 1981) was a Slovenian cross-country skier. He competed in the men's 50 kilometre event at the 1936 Winter Olympics.
