= Hommachidōri =

Street in Hirano-ku, Osaka, Japan

- Kumata Matsuri 2026 in Hommachidōri
- Native name: 本町通 (Japanese)
- Length: 881 m (2,890 ft) in 1924, when designated
- Location: Hirano (Hirano-Hommachi: Nishiwakichō, Setoguchichō, Nodōchō)
- West end: Nishikōji
- East end: Hinoshiribashi
- North: Naichidōri
- South: Umegaedōri, Sakaiguchidōri, Sanjūbudōri

Hommachidōri (本町通, Hommachi-dōri) Street is the primary main street in city central of Hirano in Hirano-ku, Osaka, Japan. It was formerly one of the main commercial streets of southern Osaka, alongside the Komagawa Shopping Street, and remains the main thoroughfare of the Hirano city center; in contrast to the modern, bustling atmosphere that characterized the Taisho and Showa eras, it now emphasizes its historical character.

== History ==
Hommachidōri is the common name of Osaka Municipal Road Hirano Ward Route No. 1593. It lies in a commercial zone and is lined with three covered shopping arcades: the Hirano Hommachidōri Shopping Street, the Hirano Chūō Hommichi Shopping Association and the former Hirano Higashi Shopping Association. Together with the Hirano Nankai Shopping Street and the former Subway Higashisuji Shopping Street, which grew up in front of the former Nankai Hirano Station, these arcades are collectively known as the Hirano Shopping District (平野商店街).

After Hirano-gō, a medieval autonomous town allied with Sakai, was burned down during the Siege of Osaka, the city was rebuilt in 1616. The street was laid out at that time as the stretch of the old Nara Kaidō that crosses the city from east to west. In the Edo period it was also called Hinoshirimonsuji (樋尻門筋; also Hinoshirisuji), after the Hinoshiri Gate at the city's eastern edge, and Watayamachisuji (綿屋町筋), because it was a wholesale district for ginned cotton. At the time, the cotton industry in Hirano—along with the "Hirano Cotton" brand—was renowned nationwide, earning the area the title of "The Cotton City (綿都)."

The opening of the Hirano Line of the Hankai Electric Tramway (later the Nankai Hirano Line) in 1914, the adoption of Hommachi as a city name in 1922, and the later establishment of a public market and a ward office helped make the street one of the main shopping districts of southern Osaka, alongside the Komagawa Shopping Street.

When the Tanimachi Line of the Osaka Municipal Subway (now Osaka Metro) opened in 1980, the Nankai Hirano Line was closed, and the street lost its role as a station-front shopping district. Since then, the number of shops has declined and many sites have been converted to housing.

A campaign to preserve the former station building led to the founding of the ecomuseum Hirano Machigurumi Hakubutsukan (Hirano Ecomuseum). The shopping associations also take part in city events, including a festival on the eve of the Hirano-gō Summer Festival (Kumata Matsuri) and the Akaruhime Festival.

== Sources ==
- Hirano-gō Kōekikai, ed. (1931). 平野郷町誌 [Gazetteer of Hirano-gō Town] (in Japanese). Hirano-gō Kōekikai.
- Kasuya, Eiichi, ed. (1 March 1980). 平野郷 大阪市編入五〇周年記念誌 [Hirano-gō: Commemorative volume for the 50th anniversary of incorporation into Osaka City] (in Japanese). Hirano Shinkōkai.
- Hirano Ward Gazetteer Editorial Committee, ed. (2005). 平野区誌 [Hirano-ku Gazetteer] (in Japanese). Hirano Ward Gazetteer Publishing Committee.
- Shiraki, Kosaburō; Tsujino, Masue; Aoki, Yōko (1976). 「平野郷」について [On "Hirano-gō"] (PDF). 大阪市立大学生活科学部紀要 (in Japanese) (23). Faculty of Life Science, Osaka City University: 119–138.
- Tsuda, Hideo (1951). 後期封建社会に於ける平野郷町の人口の変遷 [Population change in Hirano-gō Town in late feudal society]. Historia: Journal of Osaka Historical Association (in Japanese). Osaka: Osaka Historical Association: 26–54. ISSN 0439-2787.
- Niki, Hiroshi (2001). 豊臣期大坂城下町の歴史的位置 : 中近世移行期大坂研究の課題 [The historical position of the Toyotomi-period castle town of Osaka: issues in research on Osaka in the transition from the medieval to the early modern period]. Shidai Nihonshi (in Japanese). 4. Osaka City University Japanese History Society: 21–33. ISSN 1348-4508.
- Zakōya, Shunpei; Kinoshita, Hikaru (2016). 戦前大阪の都市計画における公設市場建築の変遷に関する研究 [A study of the transition of public market architecture in prewar Osaka urban planning] (PDF). Journal of Architecture and Planning (Transactions of AIJ) (in Japanese). 81 (721). Architectural Institute of Japan: 633–643. doi:10.3130/aija.81.633.
- Gunji, Hirokazu; Kinoshita, Hikaru (2019). 戦前の大阪市における公設市場を中心とした小売商業空間の形成に関する研究 [A study of the formation of retail commercial space centered on public markets in prewar Osaka City] (PDF). Journal of Architecture and Planning (Transactions of AIJ) (in Japanese). 84 (755). Architectural Institute of Japan: 107–117. doi:10.3130/aija.84.107.
- 平野をさぐる [Exploring Hirano] (PDF) (in Japanese). Kansai University Center for Naniwa and Osaka Cultural Heritage Studies. 2008.
- Saitō, Gunpachirō (1895). 大日本帝国商業地誌 [Commercial Gazetteer of the Empire of Japan] (in Japanese). Kyoto: Wakabayashi Seikichi.
- Osaka City, ed. (1935). 大阪市域拡張史 : 十周年記念 [History of the Expansion of the Area of Osaka City: Tenth Anniversary] (in Japanese). Osaka: City of Osaka.
- Okamura, Katsuyuki (2012). 平野環濠都市遺跡発掘調査報告 [Excavation report on the Hirano moated city site] (in Japanese). Osaka Museum of History Association, Osaka Cultural Properties Research Institute. doi:10.24484/sitereports.66294.
- Hirano no Machizukuri o Kangaeru Kai, ed. (1995). おもろいで平野 : 写真で見る大阪平野今昔 [Omoroi de Hirano: Hirano, Osaka, then and now in photographs] (in Japanese). Osaka: Izumi Shoin. ISBN 4-87088-752-5.
- Kakei, Sadazō (1901). 大阪鉄道略歴 [A Brief History of the Osaka Railway] (in Japanese). Osaka: Kakei Sadazō.
- Osaka City, ed. (1989). 新修大阪市史 [New Compilation History of Osaka City] (in Japanese). Vol. 3. Osaka: City of Osaka.

== See also ==
- List of avenues and streets in Osaka
- Hirano-gō
- Hirano Ichimachi – the center of early modern Hirano was Ichimachi
