= Giacomo Scalet =

Italian cross-country skier

Personal information
- Nationality: Italian
- Born: 27 December 1909
- Died: 2 May 1990 (aged 80)

Sport
- Sport: Cross-country skiing

Giacomo Scalet (27 December 1909 – 2 May 1990) was an Italian cross-country skier. He competed in the men's 50 kilometre event at the 1936 Winter Olympics.
