= Tadao Okayama =

Japanese cross-country skier (1913–1998)

Personal information
- Nationality: Japanese
- Born: 5 July 1913; Tomari, Japan (now Tomari, Russia)
- Died: 28 March 1998 (aged 84)

Sport
- Sport: Cross-country skiing

Tadao Okayama (5 July 1913 – 28 March 1998) was a Japanese cross-country skier. He competed in the men's 50 kilometre event at the 1936 Winter Olympics.
