= Tobia Senoner =

Italian cross-country skier

Personal information
- Nationality: Italian
- Born: 28 March 1913
- Died: 27 February 1980 (aged 66)

Sport
- Sport: Cross-country skiing

Tobia Senoner (28 March 1913 – 27 February 1980) was an Italian cross-country skier. He competed in the men's 50 kilometre event at the 1936 Winter Olympics.
