= Kåre Hatten =

Norwegian cross-country skier

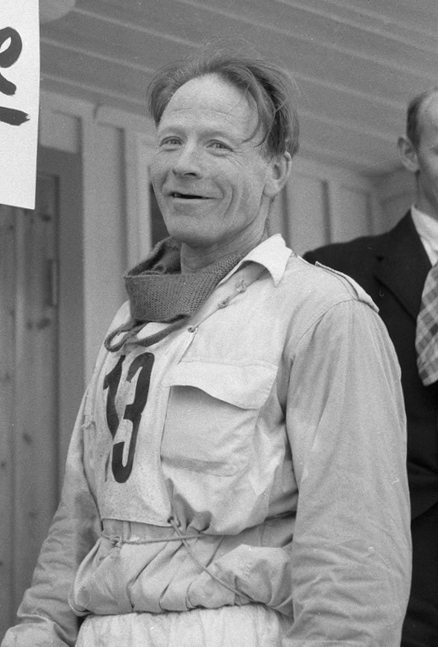
- Hatten in 1955

Personal information
- Born: 22 January 1908 Trysil, Norway
- Died: 14 April 1983 (aged 75) Trysil, Norway

Sport
- Sport: Cross-country skiing
- Club: Nordre Trysil IL

Kåre Hatten (22 January 1908 – 14 April 1983) was a Norwegian cross-country skier. He participated in the 1936 Winter Olympics, where he placed 12th over 50 km. He was a Norwegian champion in the 30 km in 1932, and competed at the 1934 and 1935 World Championships.

Hatten was known for his eating and drinking habits in competitions. During one 50 km race he consumed six sandwiches and six cups of gruel. He worked first as a lumberjack, and later as a farmer.

== Cross-country skiing results ==
=== Olympic Games ===
Year	Age	18 km	50 km	4 × 10 km relay
1936	28	—	12	—

=== World Championships ===
Year	Age	18 km	50 km	4 × 10 km relay
1934	26	22	19	—
1935	27	18	8	—
