= Toni Zeller =

German cross-country skier (1909–1962)

Anton "Toni" Zeller (15 December 1909 - 1962) was a German cross-country skier who competed in the 1936 Winter Olympics.

In 1936, he was a member of the German relay team which finished sixth in the 4x10 km relay competition. In the 18 km event, he finished 27th.
