= Oldřich Kučera =

Czech ice hockey player

Personal information
- Nationality: Czech
- Born: 1 July 1914; Prague, Austria-Hungary
- Died: 1 January 1964 (aged 49); Gstaad, Switzerland

Sport
- Sport: Ice hockey

Oldřich Kučera (1 July 1914 – 1 January 1964) was a Czech ice hockey player. He competed in the men's tournament at the 1936 Winter Olympics.
