= Sommer's sector =

Region of the hippocampus

Identifiers
- NeuroLex ID: nlx_anat_1005009

Sommer's Sector is region CA1 of the hippocampus, a part of the human brain. It is particularly vulnerable to hypoxic or ischemic damage and is one of the first brain regions to show gross changes in cerebral hypoxia. Sommer's sector is one of the vulnerable areas in global cerebral ischemia. Generally, the hippocampus is responsible for longterm memory, and the CA1 area appears to help recall autobiographical memory and detailed memory.
