= Camillo Mussi =

Italian ice hockey player

Personal information
- Nationality: Italian
- Born: 18 November 1911; Milan, Italy
- Died: 17 August 1940 (aged 28); Sidi Barrani, Egypt

Sport
- Sport: Ice hockey

Camillo Mussi (18 November 1911 – 17 August 1940) was an Italian ice hockey player. He competed in the men's tournament at the 1936 Winter Olympics. He was killed during World War II after the plane he was piloting was shot down in Egypt.
