= Roman Stupnicki =

Polish ice hockey player

- Born: 30 November 1913 Lemberg, Austria-Hungary (now Lviv, Ukraine)
- Died: 27 January 1954 (aged 40) Wrexham, Wales
- Position: Left wing
- Played for: Czarni Lwów
- National team: Poland
- Playing career: 1931–1939

Roman Stupnicki (30 November 1913 – 27 January 1954) was a Polish ice hockey player. He played for Czarni Lwów during his career. He also played for the Polish national team at the 1936 Winter Olympics.
