= Toshihiko Shoji =

Japanese ice hockey player

Personal information
- Nationality: Japanese
- Born: 23 April 1909

Sport
- Sport: Ice hockey

Toshihiko Shoji (庄司 敏彦, Shōji Toshihiko; born 23 April 1909, date of death unknown) was a Japanese ice hockey player. He competed in the men's tournament at the 1936 Winter Olympics.
