= Janne Heikkinen =

Janne Heikkinen may refer to:

- Janne Heikkinen (volleyball) (born 1976), Finnish volleyball player
- Janne Heikkinen (politician) (born 1990), Finnish politician
