= Marquardt Slevogt =

German ice hockey player

Olympic medal record

Men's Ice hockey
Bronze medal – third place	1932 Lake Placid	Team competition

Friedrich Marquardt Slevogt (22 March 1909 in Karlsruhe – 25 May 1980) was a German ice hockey player who competed in the 1928 Winter Olympics and 1932 Winter Olympics.

In 1928 he was a member of the German ice hockey team, which placed last in his preliminary group of the Olympic tournament and did not advance.

Four years later he was a member of the German ice hockey team, which won the bronze medal. He played five matches.
