= Timo-Pekka Heikkinen =

Finnish ice hockey player

- Born: March 21, 1985 (age 41) Jyväskylä, Finland
- Height: 5 ft 8 in (173 cm)
- Weight: 172 lb (78 kg; 12 st 4 lb)
- Position: Forward
- Shoots: Right
- Suomi-sarja team Former teams: PYRY; FPS (ice hockey); JYP; KeuPa HT; KooKoo
- NHL draft: Undrafted
- Playing career: 2008–present

Timo-Pekka Heikkinen (born March 21, 1985) is a Finnish professional ice hockey player. He is currently playing for PYRY of the Finnish Suomi-sarja.

Heikkinen made his Liiga debut playing with JYP during the 2008-09 Liiga season.
