= Wilhelm Larsson =

Swedish ice hockey player

Personal information
- Nationality: Swedish
- Born: 23 June 1911 Stockholm, Sweden
- Died: 13 September 1971 (aged 60) Stockholm, Sweden

Sport
- Sport: Ice hockey

Vilhelm Harry Larsson-Lagheim (23 June 1911 – 13 September 1971) was a Swedish ice hockey player. He competed in the men's tournament at the 1936 Winter Olympics.
