= Fritz Rammelmayr =

German ice hockey player

- Born: July 27, 1893
- Position: Left wing
- Played for: SC Riessersee
- National team: Germany
- Playing career: 1922–1934

Fritz Rammelmayr (born July 27, 1893) is a former German ice hockey player. Rammelmayr played on the Germany men's national ice hockey team at the 1928 Winter Olympics.
