= Asao Hirano =

Japanese physician (1926–2019)

- Born: November 26, 1926
- Died: July 25, 2019 (aged 92)
- Known for: Hirano body
- Medical career
- Profession: physician medical researcher
- Institutions: Montefiore Hospital; Albert Einstein College of Medicine
- Research: neuropathology

Asao Hirano (平野朝雄, Hirano Asao; November 26, 1926 – July 25, 2019) was a Japanese physician, academic, medical researcher and neuropathologist. He is credited with having first observed Hirano bodies which are intracellular aggregates of actin and actin-associated proteins in the neurons (nerve cells).

== Career ==
Dr. Hirano was a professor of pathology at Albert Einstein College of Medicine.

== Selected works ==
In a statistical overview derived from writings by and about Asao Hirano, OCLC/WorldCat encompasses roughly 30 works in 50+ publications in 5 languages and 1,000+ library holdings.

- Electron Microscopic Atlas of Brain Tumors (1971), with Tung Pui Poon
- Atlas of Neuropathology (1974), with by Nathan Malamud
- An Atlas of the Human Brain for Computerized Tomography (1978), with Takayoshi Matsui
- Color Atlas of Pathology of the Nervous System (1980)
- A Guide to Neuropathology (1981)
- Atlas d'anatomie pathologique du système nerveux (1981)
- Neuropsychiatric Disorders in the Elderly (1983)
- Praktischer Leitfaden der Neuropathologie (1983)
- The Pathology of the Myelinated Axon (1984), with Masazumi Adachi
- 神経病理を学ぶ人のために (1986)
- 神経病理を学ぶ人のために (2003)
- カラーアトラス神経病理 (2006)

== Honors ==
- Order of the Rising Sun, 2001.
