= Sakanoue =

Sakanoue (written: 坂上 or 坂ノ上) is a Japanese surname. Notable people with the surname include:

- Akane Sakanoue (坂ノ上 茜; born 1995), Japanese actress
- Sakanoue no Karitamaro (坂上 苅田麿; 727–786), Japanese samurai
- Sakanoue no Korenori (坂上 是則), Japanese waka poet
- Sakanoue no Mochiki (坂上望城; died c. 975), Japanese waka poet and son of Sakanoue no Korenori
- Sakanoue no Tamuramaro (坂上 田村麻呂; 758–811), Japanese general and shōgun

== See also ==
- 5862 Sakanoue, a main-belt asteroid
