= Frans Heikkinen =

Finnish cross-country skier

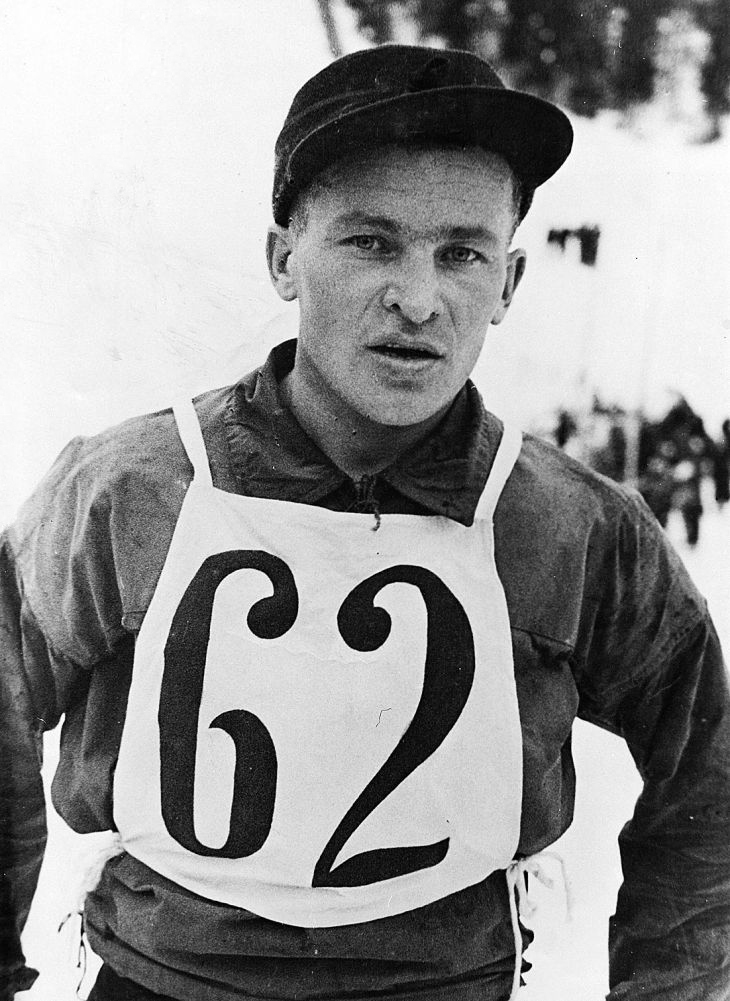

Personal information
- Born: 22 April 1906 Paltamo, Finland
- Died: 8 October 1943 (aged 37) Lieksa, Finland
- Height: 165 cm (5 ft 5 in)
- Weight: 61 kg (134 lb)

Sport
- Sport: Cross-country skiing

Frans Heikkinen (22 April 1906 – 8 October 1943) was a Finnish cross-country skier. He competed in the 1936 Winter Olympics and finished seventh in the 50 km event.

Heikkinen was born to a farmer and had a sister Eeva and three brothers, Lauri, Jaakko and Esko; all siblings were accomplished cross-country skiers. He worked as a teacher in Sotkamo, where in the early 1930s he married a fellow teacher Hilppa Liisa Iivonen. He died from a brain hemorrhage during the Continuation War, aged 37.

== Cross-country skiing results ==
=== World Championships ===
Year	Age	18 km	50 km	4 × 10 km relay
1938	31	—	33	—
