= Hirano =

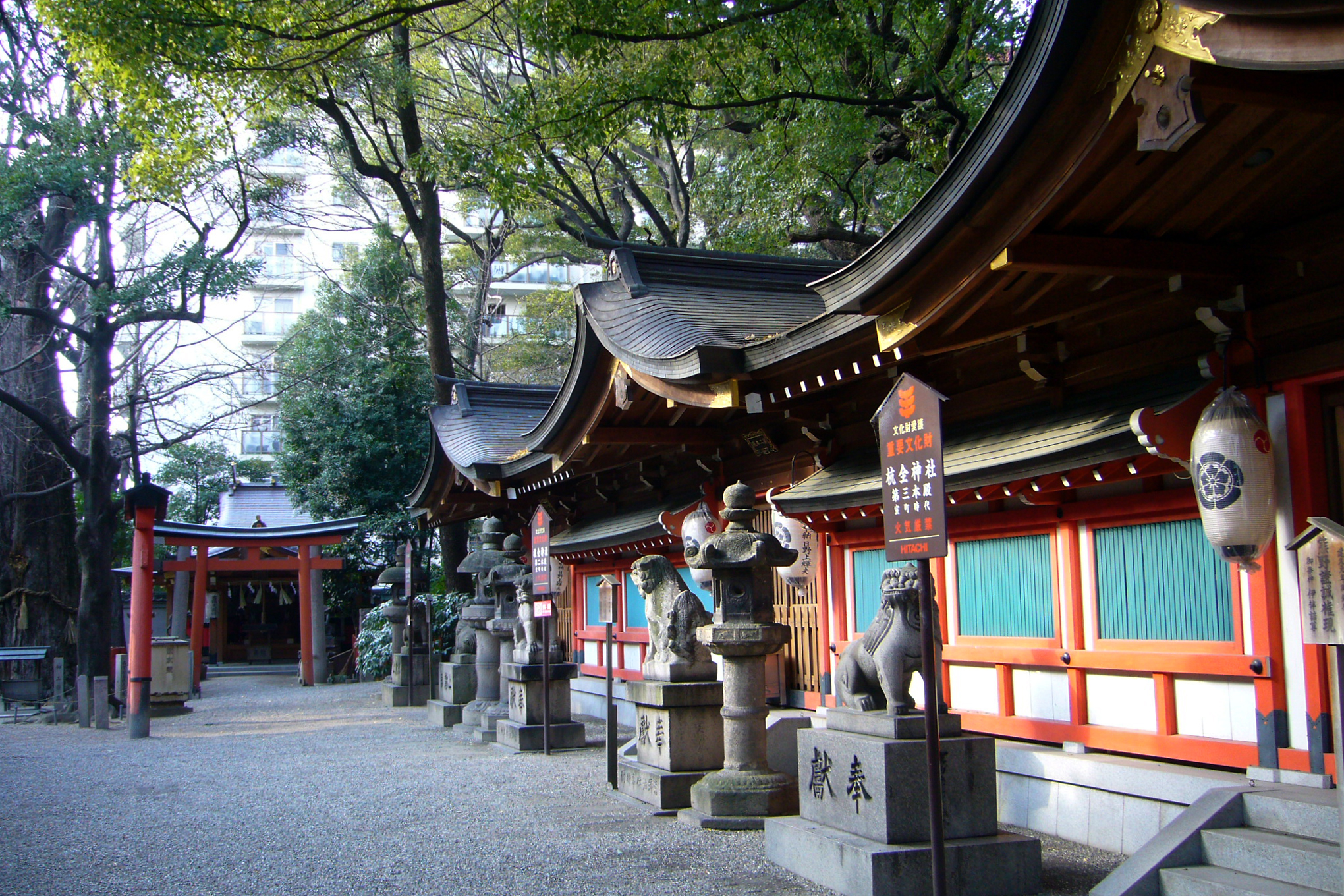
Kumata Shrine

Hirano (Japanese: 平野, lit. 'plain field'), (Note: There are several theories regarding the origin of the place name Hirano. Although it can be interpreted literally as meaning "flat plain" or "level field", the most widely accepted theory is that it derives from Hirano, the personal name of Sakanoue no Hironomaro, and that the pronunciation subsequently shifted from Hirono to Hirano.) (Note: To avoid confusion, the place is also sometimes prefixed with the province or prefectural name, as Settsu Hirano (Japanese: 摂津平野), Sesshū Hirano (Japanese: 摂州平野), or Osaka Hirano (Japanese: 大阪平野). There are also other places named Hirano in Settsu Province.) historically known as Hirano-gō (Japanese: 平野郷), is a former city in Settsu Province, and is now a district in Hirano-ku, Osaka, Japan. It was an autonomous city, in which the townspeople governed the city by council.

== History ==
In ancient times, it was a major transportation hub through which several roads passed, and during the Sengoku period it was an autonomous city allying with Sakai in Izumi Province.

=== Edo Period ===
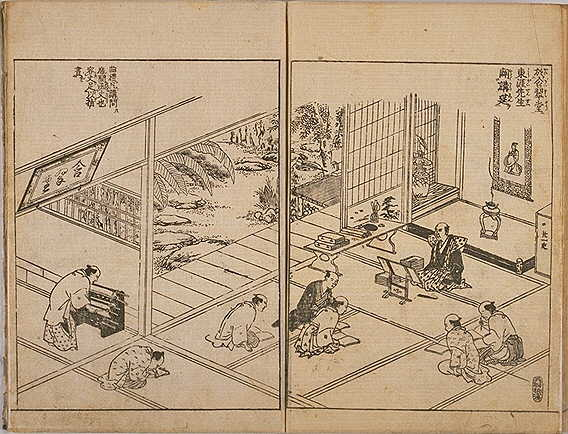
Itō Tōgai, who is a confucian scholar from Osaka. In Gansuido, Hirano.

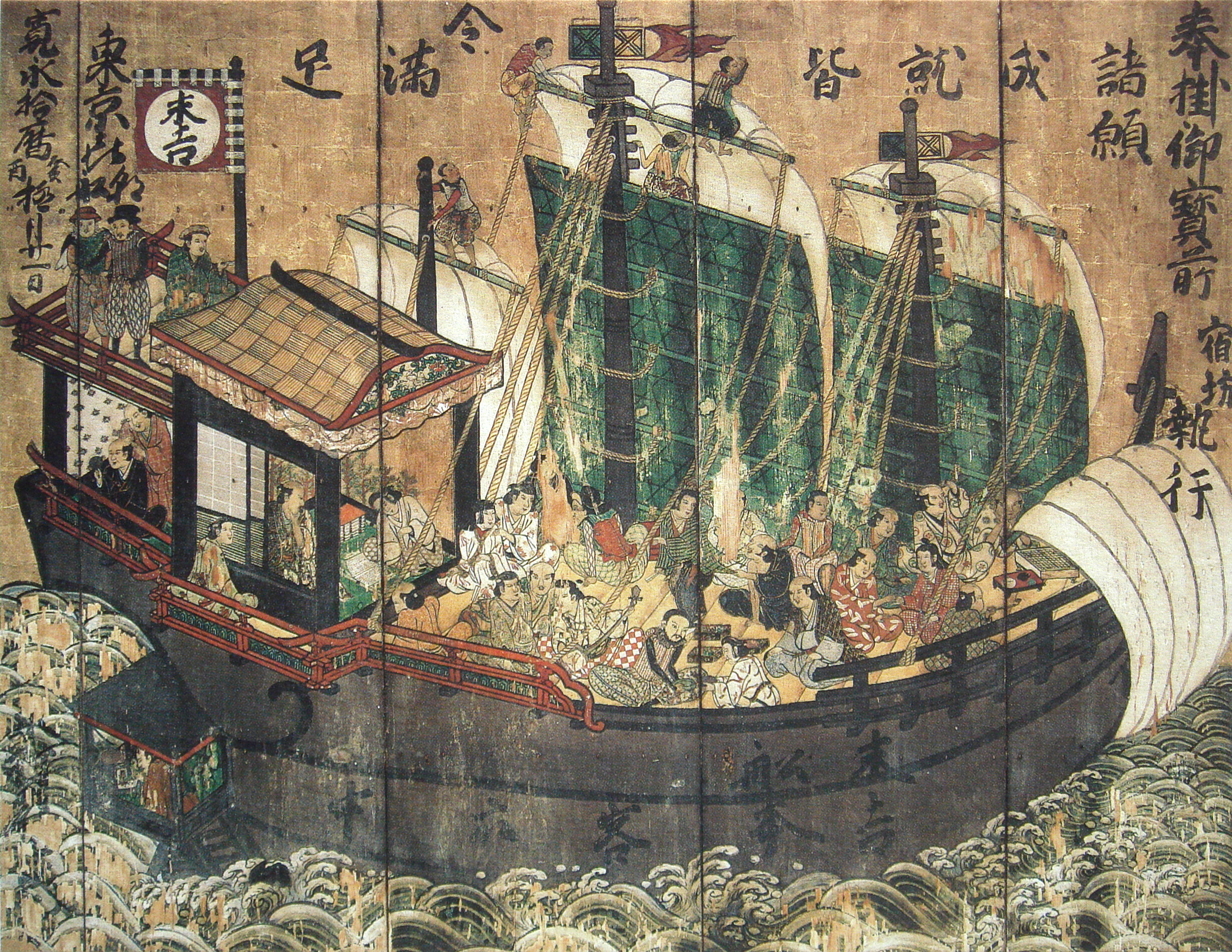
Red Seal ship trade with the Nanban countries, by Sueyoshi Family, one of the Hirano Seven Houses.

During the Edo period, after being completely burned down in the Siege of Osaka, Hirano was rebuilt as a commercial city. Benefiting from the burgeoning cultivation of cotton in neighbouring Kawachi Province, it gradually specialised in the textile industry. Alongside its commercial development, and owing to the Sakanoue family's ancient ties with Kyoto, Hirano cultivated cultural aspects, fostering the appreciation of renga, haiku, noh, and more. It was also home to Gansuido (含翠堂), sometimes considered Osaka's first private academy.

=== Modern Times ===
Following the Meiji Restoration, leveraging its economic strength, Hirano became involved in the construction of the Osaka Railway and Kayo Railway, and the founding of Hirano Spinning (Hirano Bōseki, now Unitika). The Nankai Hirano Line, connecting the Tennōji area to Hirano, was built, and the downtown: Hommachidōri grew up around its terminus at Nankai Hirano Station.

=== Nowadays ===
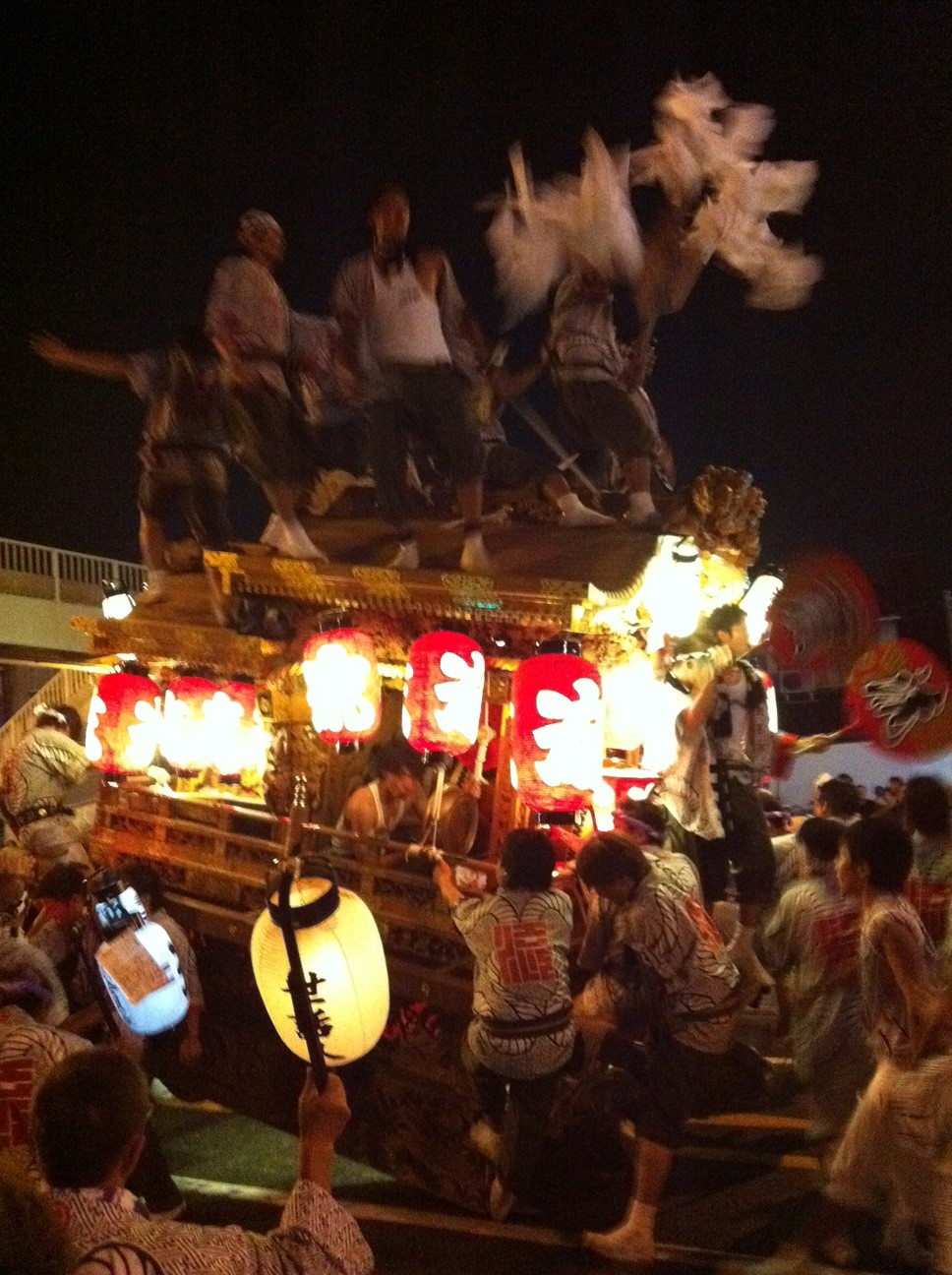
A danjiri of Nagare-machi (one of the nine historical district of Hirano)

When the Nankai Hirano Line was converted into the Subway Tanimachi Line, the town centre shifted to the area around Hirano Station on the Osaka Metro, and the old quarter became a district where historic landscapes are preserved within a residential neighbourhood. Even today, the Hirano-gō Summer Festival is held, the largest danjiri festival in Osaka City.
