= Thomas Pleisch =

Swiss ice hockey player

- Born: 17 December 1913; Switzerland
- Died: 16 March 1936 (aged 22); Basel, Switzerland
- Position: Right Wing
- Played for: EHC St. Moritz
- National team: Switzerland
- Playing career: 1931–1936

Thomas Pleisch (17 December 1913 – 16 March 1936) was a Swiss ice hockey player who competed for the Swiss national team at the 1936 Winter Olympics in Garmisch-Partenkirchen.
