= Kalle Heikkinen =

Finnish cross-country skier

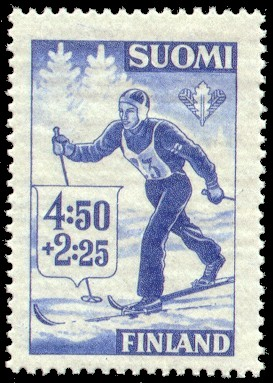

Personal information
- Nationality: Finnish
- Born: 20 February 1908 Paltamo, Finland
- Died: 15 December 1938 (aged 30) Uusimaa, Finland

Sport
- Sport: Cross-country skiing

Kalle Heikkinen (20 February 1908 – 15 December 1938) was a Finnish cross-country skier. He competed in the men's 50 kilometre event at the 1936 Winter Olympics.

== Cross-country skiing results ==
=== Olympic Games ===
| Year | Age | 18 km | 50 km | 4 × 10 km relay |
|---|---|---|---|---|
| 1936 | 28 | — | 14 | — |

=== World Championships ===
| Year | Age | 18 km | 50 km | 4 × 10 km relay |
|---|---|---|---|---|
| 1938 | 30 | — | 10 | — |
