= Shinkichi Kamei =

Japanese ice hockey player

- Born: 20 June 1910
- Position: Right wing
- National team: Japan

Shinkichi Kamei (亀井 信吉, Kamei Shinkichi; born 20 June 1910, date of death unknown) was a Japanese ice hockey player. He competed in the men's tournament at the 1936 Winter Olympics.
