= Josef Ponn =

German cross-country skier (1906–1939)

Personal information
- Nationality: German
- Born: 9 October 1906; Berchtesgaden, German Empire
- Died: 8 June 1939 (aged 32); Hallein, State of Austria, Nazi Germany

Sport
- Sport: Cross-country skiing

Josef Ponn (9 October 1906 – 8 June 1939) was a German cross-country skier. He competed in the men's 50 kilometre event at the 1936 Winter Olympics.
