= Erich Marx =

German cross-country skier

Personal information
- Nationality: German
- Born: 3 June 1906

Sport
- Sport: Cross-country skiing

Erich Marx (born 3 June 1906, date of death unknown) was a German cross-country skier. He competed in the men's 50 kilometre event at the 1936 Winter Olympics.
