= Otto Heller (author) =

- Born: 4 July 1863; Karlovy Vary, Bohemia, Austrian Empire
- Died: 29 July 1941 (aged 78); Bellaire, Michigan, US
- Education: University of Chicago
- Spouse: Jean S. Blair Heller
- Writing career
- Notable work: Prophets of Dissent

Otto Heller (4 July 1863 – 29 July 1941) was an author and academic. Heller wrote Prophets of Dissent.

== Career ==
Heller was born in Karlsbad, Bohemia (now Karlovy Vary, Czech Republic). He attended the University of Prague, followed by the universities of Munich, Vienna, and Berlin. He came to the United States in 1883 as a tutor and secured the post of instructor in Greek at La Salle College in Philadelphia in 1887. Heller received his Ph.D. from the University of Chicago in 1890.

Heller taught briefly at the Massachusetts Institute of Technology before becoming a professor of German language and literature at Washington University in St. Louis in 1892. In 1914, Heller was promoted to professor of modern European literature in addition to his original professorship, and in 1924 he became the first dean of the Graduate School of Arts and Sciences, a post he held until he became dean emeritus in 1937.

Heller died on 28 July 1941 at his summer cottage in Bellaire, Michigan.

== Works ==
- Studies in modern German literature (1905)
- Henrik Ibsen: plays and problems (1912)
- Prophets of Dissent: Essays on Maeterlinck, Strindberg, Nietzsche and Tolstoy (1918)

== Works or publications ==
- Heller, Otto, 1863-1941; Leon, Theodore H., 1907- (1941), The Language of Charles Sealsfield; a Study in a Typical Usage, St. Louis, OCLC 1870546
- Heller, Otto, 1863-1941; Leon, Theodore H. (Theodore Herzl), 1907- (1939), Charles Sealsfield : Bibliography of His Writings, Together With a Classified and Annotated Catalogue of Literature Relating to His Works and His Life, St. Louis: [publisher not identified], OCLC 1432414
- Faust and Faustus; a Study of Goethe's Relation to Marlowe, New York: Cooper Square Publishers, 1972, OCLC 324081
- Frenssen, Gustav, 1863-1945; Heller, Otto, 1863-1941 (1906), Gravelotte; Chapter Xiv of Jörn Uhl, by Gustav Frenssen;, New York: Ginn & Company, OCLC 1457382
- Meyer, Conrad Ferdinand, 1825-1898; Heller, Otto, 1863-1941 (1911), Gustav Adolfs Page, Boston: D.C. Heath, OCLC 555507983
- Meyer, Conrad Ferdinand, 1825-1898; Heller, Otto, 1863-1941 (1893), Gustav Adolfs page von Conrad Ferdinand Meyer;, Boston: D.C. Heath, OCLC 2830537
- Henrik Ibsen; Plays and Problems, Boston and New York: Houghton Mifflin Co., 1912, OCLC 788372
- Storm, Theodor, 1817-1888; Heller, Otto, 1863-1941 (1917), In St. Jürgen;, New York: H. Holt and Company, OCLC 5920266
- La fin du judaïsme;, Paris: Les Éditions Rieder, 1933, OCLC 2055196
- Lessing, Gotthold Ephraim, 1729-1781; Heller, Otto, 1863-1941; Wolf, Ernst Louis, 1863- (1909), Lessing's Minna von Barnhelm, oder, Das Soldatenglück, Chicago: Scott, Foresman & Co., OCLC 861551298
- Lessing, Gotthold Ephraim, 1729-1781; Heller, Otto, 1863-1941 (1917), Minna Von Barnhelm; Or, Soldier's Fortune, New York: H. Holt and Company, OCLC 4545348
- Prophets of Dissent; Essays on Maeterlinck, Strindberg, Nietzsche, and Tolstoy, Port Washington, N.Y.: Kennikat Press, 1968, OCLC 327984
- Studies in Modern German Literature: Sundermann; Hauptmann; Women Writers of the Nineteenth Century, New York: Ginn & Co., 1905, OCLC 378247

=== Plays ===
- Wildenbruch, Ernst von, 1845-1909; Clarke, Hugh Archibald, 1839-1927; Heller, Otto, 1863-1941; Folio, Frank (1970), Harold, OCLC 8342877

=== Collection Editor ===
- Nagel, Charles, 1849-1940; Heller, Otto, 1863-1941 (1931), Charles Nagel, Speeches and Writings, 1900-1928 .., New York: G.P. Putnam's Sons, OCLC 4389265

=== Speech ===
- The Seriousness of Mark Twain : Address at the Annual Dinner of the State Historical Society at Hannibal, Missouri, Thursday, May 9, 1935, Hannibal, Mo.: Hannibal Chamber of Commerce, 1935, OCLC 4383217

=== German ===
- Stifter, Adalbert, 1805-1868; Heller, Otto, 1863-1941 (1891), Das Haidedorf, Boston: D.C. Heath & Co., OCLC 7800240
- Baumbach, Rudolf, 1840-1905; Heller, Otto, 1863-1941 (1908), Der schwiegersohn; eine schneidergeschichte, New York: H. Holt, OCLC 2552798
- Schücking, Levin, 1814-1883; Heller, Otto, 1863-1941 (1903), Die drei Freier, Erzählung von Levin Schucking;, Boston: Ginn & Company, OCLC 1449460

== Personal life ==
Heller was married to Jean S. Blair Heller.

== See also ==
- Faust
- Gerhart Hauptmann
- Henrik Ibsen
- Maurice Maeterlinck
- Friedrich Nietzsche
- August Strindberg
- Charles Sealsfield
- Hermann Sudermann
- Leo Tolstoy
