= Herbert Kessler =

Swiss ice hockey player (1912–1966)

- Born: 28 December 1912 Santa Domenica, Switzerland
- Died: 15 November 1966 (aged 53) Davos, Switzerland
- Position: Left wing
- Played for: ZSC Lions
- National team: Switzerland
- Playing career: 1932–1942

Herbert Walter Kessler (28 December 1912 – 15 November 1966) was a Swiss ice hockey player who competed for the Swiss national team at the 1936 Winter Olympics in Garmisch-Partenkirchen. His brother, Charles Kessler, also competed as a member of the national team at the 1936 Games.
