= Fritz Gaiser =

German cross-country skier (1907–1994)

Personal information
- Nationality: German
- Born: 6 March 1907; Baiersbronn, German Empire
- Died: 8 June 1994 (aged 87); Baiersbronn, Germany

Sport
- Sport: Cross-country skiing

Fritz Gaiser (6 March 1907 – 8 June 1994) was a German cross-country skier. He competed in the men's 50 kilometre event at the 1936 Winter Olympics.
