= Bertil Norberg =

Swedish ice hockey player

Personal information
- Nationality: Swedish
- Born: 14 July 1910; Stockholm, Sweden
- Died: 24 March 1995 (aged 84); Stockholm, Sweden

Sport
- Sport: Ice hockey

Bertil Rudolf Tage Norberg (14 July 1910 – 24 March 1995) was a Swedish ice hockey player. He competed in the men's tournament at the 1936 Winter Olympics.
