= Tatsuo Ichikawa =

Japanese ice hockey player (born 1916)

Personal information
- Nationality: Japanese
- Born: 11 February 1916 Iiyama, Japan

Sport
- Sport: Ice hockey

Tatsuo Ichikawa (市川 辰雄, Ichikawa Tatsuo; born 11 February 1916, date of death unknown) was a Japanese ice hockey player. He competed in the men's tournament at the 1936 Winter Olympics. Ichikawa is deceased.
