= Walter Ullrich =

Czech ice hockey player

Personal information
- Nationality: Czech
- Born: 15 June 1912; Opava, Austria-Hungary
- Died: 5 July 1965 (aged 53); Ostrava, Czechoslovakia

Sport
- Sport: Ice hockey

Walter Ullrich (15 June 1912 – 5 July 1965) was a Czech ice hockey player. He competed in the men's tournament at the 1936 Winter Olympics.
