= Erich Römer =

German ice hockey player

Olympic medal record

Men's Ice hockey
Bronze medal – third place	1932 Lake Placid	Team competition

Erich Römer (2 June 1894 – 26 March 1987) was a German ice hockey player, born in Berlin, who competed in the 1928 Winter Olympics and 1932 Winter Olympics.

In 1928 he was a member of the German ice hockey team, which placed last in his preliminary group of the Olympic tournament and did not advance.

Four years later he was a member of the German ice hockey team, which won the bronze medal. He played all six matches.
