= Charles Kessler =

Swiss ice hockey player

- Born: January 11, 1911; Switzerland
- Died: April 10, 1998 (aged 87)
- Position: Right Wing
- Played for: ZSC Lions
- National team: Switzerland
- Playing career: 1930–1944

Karl "Charles" Kessler (January 11, 1911 – April 10, 1998) was a Swiss ice hockey player who competed for the Swiss national team at the 1936 Winter Olympics in Garmisch-Partenkirchen.

== Personal life ==
His brother, Herbert Kessler, also competed as a member of the national team at the 1936 Games.
