= 1964–65 Polska Liga Hokejowa season =

Polish ice hockey season

The 1964–65 Polska Liga Hokejowa season was the 30th season of the Polska Liga Hokejowa, the top level of ice hockey in Poland. Eight teams participated in the league, and GKS Katowice won the championship.

== Final round ==
	Club	GP	Goals	Pts
1.	GKS Katowice	6	29:12	9
2.	Legia Warszawa	6	29:12	9
3.	Polonia Bydgoszcz	6	17:20	3
4.	Baildon Katowice	6	14:41	2

== 5th-8th place ==
	Club
5.	Podhale Nowy Targ
6.	ŁKS Łódź
7.	Naprzód Janów
8.	Górnik Murcki
