= Trhanov =

- Municipality
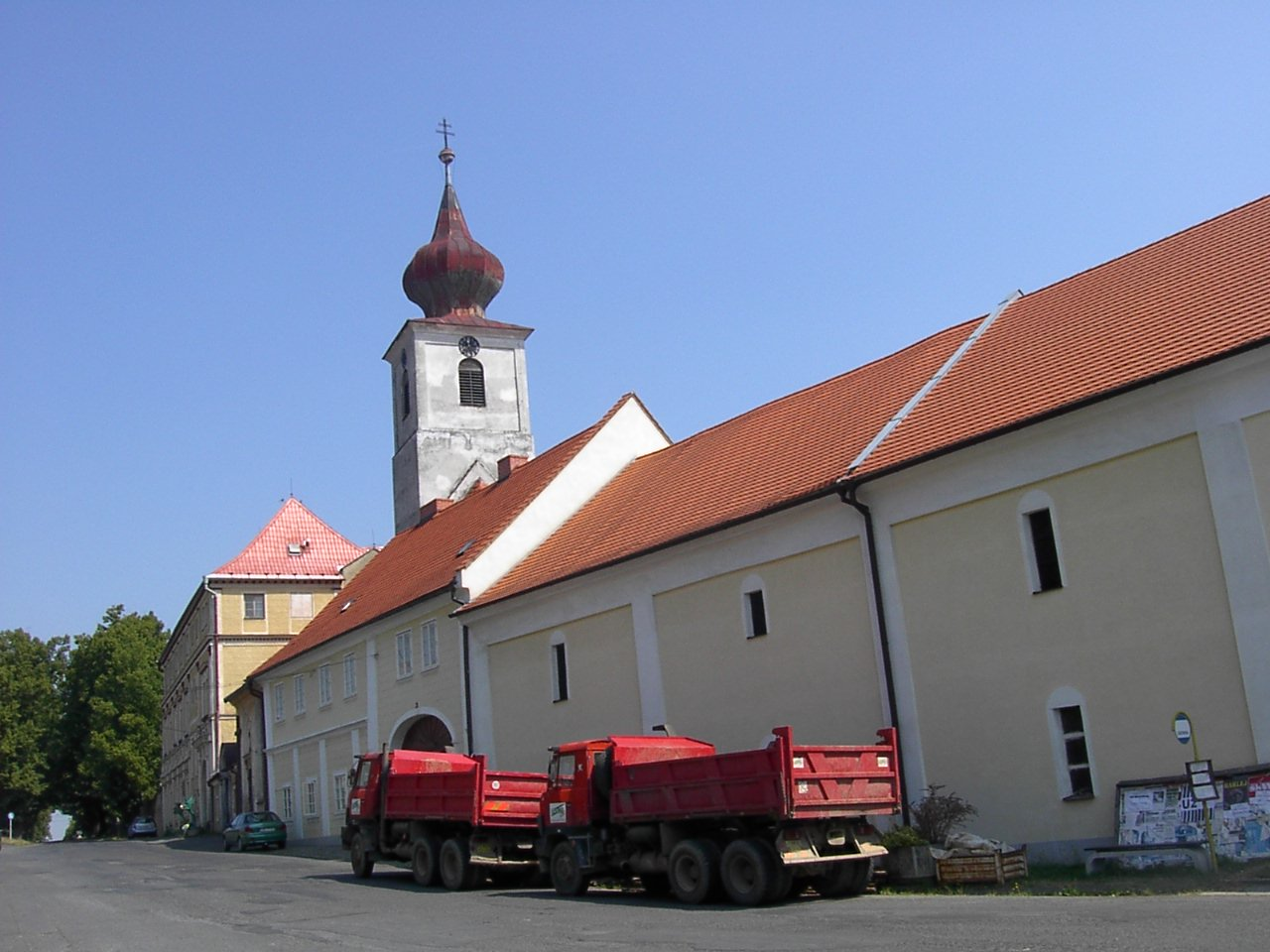
- Trhanov Castle

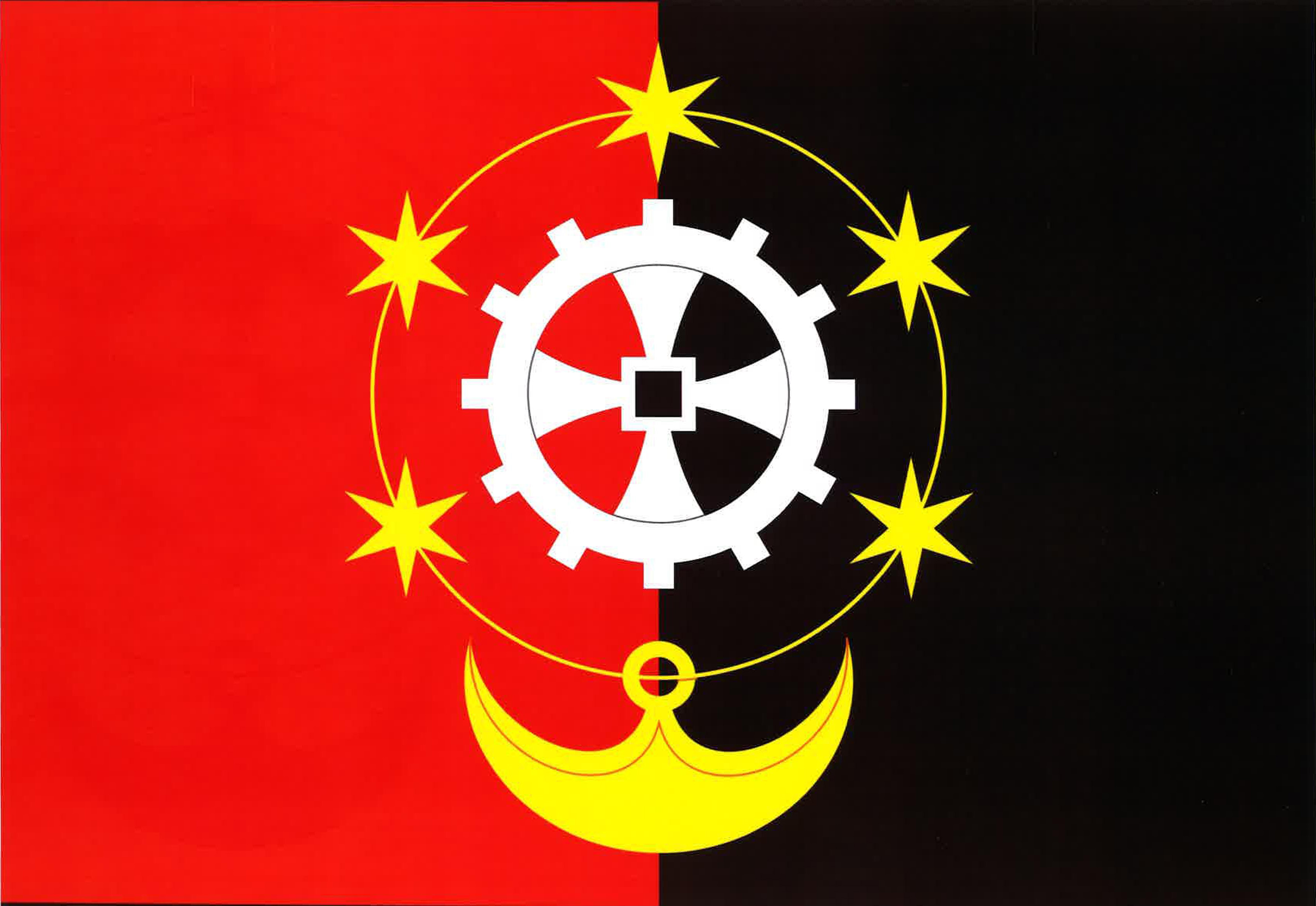
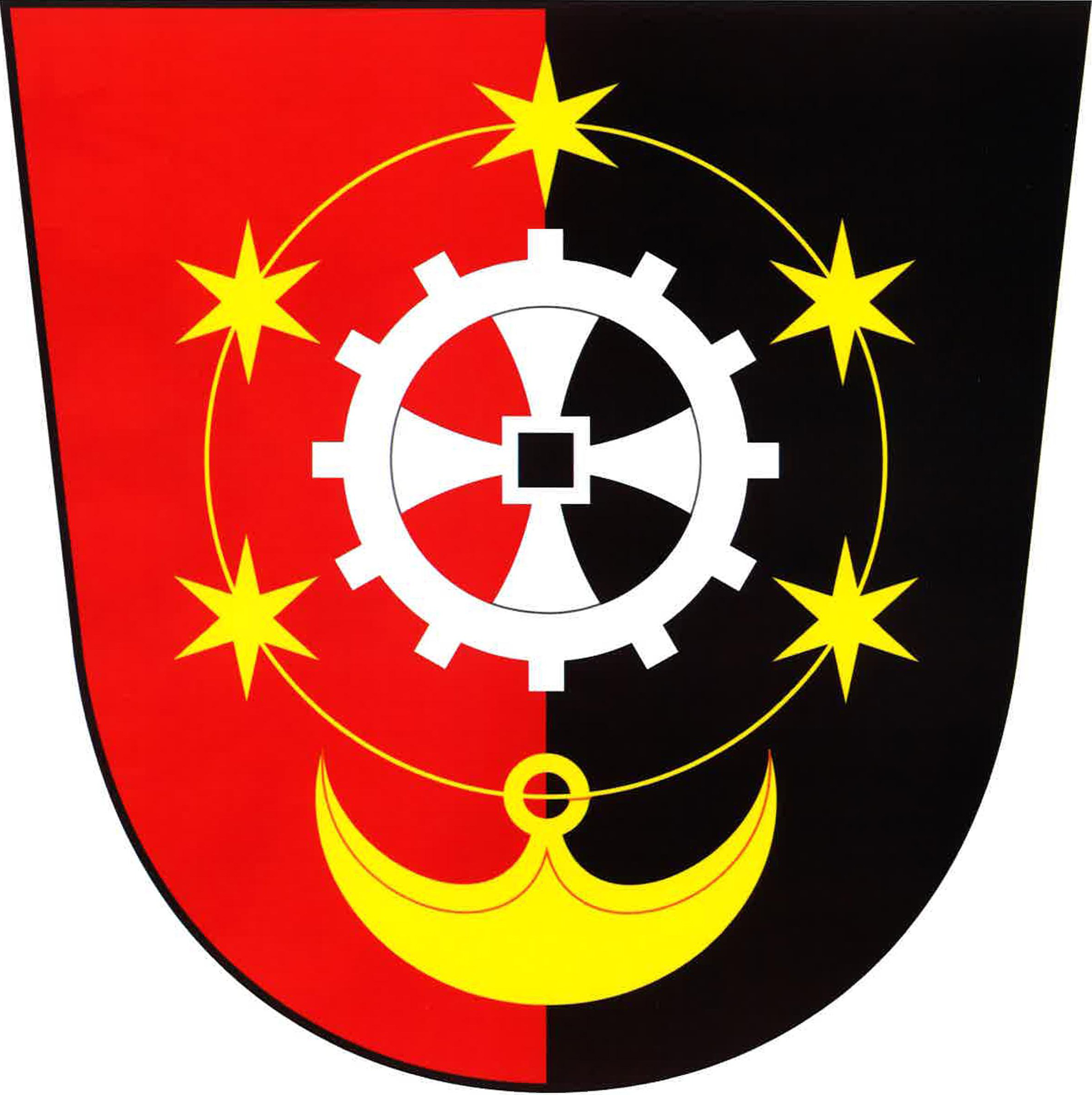
- Flag Coat of arms

- Location in the Czech Republic
- Coordinates: 49°25′13″N 12°50′44″E
- Country: Czech Republic
- Region: Plzeň
- District: Domažlice
- First mentioned: 1261

Area
  - Total: 2.14 km^{2} (0.83 sq mi)
- Elevation: 456 m (1,496 ft)

Population (2026-01-01)
  - Total: 521
  - Density: 243/km^{2} (631/sq mi)
- Time zone: UTC+1 (CET)
  - Summer (DST): UTC+2 (CEST)
- Postal code: 345 33
- Website: www.trhanov.cz

Trhanov is a municipality and village in Domažlice District in the Plzeň Region of the Czech Republic. It has about 500 inhabitants.

Trhanov lies approximately 7 kilometres (4 mi) west of Domažlice, 53 km (33 mi) south-west of Plzeň, and 136 km (85 mi) south-west of Prague.

== Administrative division ==
Trhanov consists of two municipal parts (in brackets population according to the 2021 census):

- Trhanov (480)
- Pila (57)

== Demographics ==
Historical population
Year	Pop.	±%
1869	599	—
1880	548	−8.5%
1890	516	−5.8%
1900	576	+11.6%
1910	534	−7.3%
1921	672	+25.8%
1930	465	−30.8%
1950	466	+0.2%
1961	451	−3.2%
1970	521	+15.5%
1980	591	+13.4%
1991	500	−15.4%
2001	544	+8.8%
2011	547	+0.6%
2021	537	−1.8%
Source: Censuses
