= Lado Senčar =

Slovenian cross-country skier

Personal information
- Nationality: Slovenian
- Born: 17 May 1908; Ljubljana, Austria-Hungary
- Died: 1998 (aged 89–90)

Sport
- Sport: Cross-country skiing

Lado Senčar (17 May 1908 – 1998) was a Slovenian cross-country skier. He competed in the men's 50 kilometre event at the 1936 Winter Olympics.
