= Ernst Hug =

Swiss ice hockey player

- Born: 23 October 1910; Zürich, Switzerland
- Died: April 1979 (aged 68); Zürich, Switzerland
- Position: Defence
- Played for: Grasshopper Club Zürich
- National team: Switzerland
- Playing career: 1931–1938

Ernst A. Hug (23 October 1910 – April 1979) was a Swiss ice hockey player who competed for the Swiss national team at the 1936 Winter Olympics in Garmisch-Partenkirchen.
