= Georg von Kaufmann =

German cross-country skier (1907–1972)

Personal information
- Nationality: German
- Born: 24 May 1907 Munich, German Empire
- Died: 3 May 1972 (aged 64) Giebing, West Germany

Sport
- Sport: Cross-country skiing

Georg von Kaufmann (24 May 1907 – 3 May 1972) was a German cross-country skier. He competed in the men's 18 kilometre event at the 1936 Winter Olympics.
