= 1936–37 Polska Liga Hokejowa season =

Polish ice hockey season

The 1936–37 Polska Liga Hokejowa season was the ninth season of the Polska Liga Hokejowa, the top level of ice hockey in Poland. Five teams participated in the final round, and KS Cracovia won the championship.

== Qualification ==
- KS Cracovia - Pogoń Lwów 3:1/6:2

== Final Tournament ==
	Club
1.	KS Cracovia
2.	AZS Warszawa
3.	KTH Krynica
4.	Czarni Lwów
5.	KS Warszawianka
