= 1946–47 Polska Liga Hokejowa season =

Polish ice hockey season

The 1946–47 Polska Liga Hokejowa season was the 12th season of the Polska Liga Hokejowa, the top level of ice hockey in Poland. Four teams participated in the final round, and KS Cracovia won the championship.

== Semifinal ==
- KS Pomorzanin Toruń - Lech Posen 2:2/0:1

== Final Tournament ==
	Club	GP	Goals	Pts
1.	Wisła Kraków	3	13:5	5
2.	KS Cracovia	3	12:5	5
3.	ŁKS Łódź	3	4:7	4
4.	Lech Poznań	3	3:15	2

=== Final ===
- KS Cracovia - Wisła Kraków 4:3
