= 1945–46 Polska Liga Hokejowa season =

Polish ice hockey season

The 1945–46 Polska Liga Hokejowa season marked the 11th edition of the Polska Liga Hokejowa, which represents the highest tier of ice hockey competition in Poland. The final round of the season featured four participating teams, and it was KS Cracovia that emerged victorious, securing the championship title.

== Final Tournament ==
	Club	GP	Goals	Pts
1.	KS Cracovia	3	12:1	6
2.	ŁKS Łódź	3	3:6	3
3.	Siła Giszowiec	3	5:7	2
4.	Lech Poznań	3	2:8	1
