= Kozue Kinoshita =

Japanese ice hockey player

- Born: 15 April 1912
- Position: Right wing
- National team: Japan

Kozue Kinoshita (木下 梢, Kinoshita Kozue; born 15 April 1912, date of death unknown) was a Japanese ice hockey player. He competed in the men's tournament at the 1936 Winter Olympics.
