= Masatatsu Kitazawa =

Japanese ice hockey player (born 1916)

Personal information
- Nationality: Japanese
- Born: 29 April 1916 Tomakomai, Japan

Sport
- Sport: Ice hockey

Masatatsu Kitazawa (北沢 正辰, Kitazawa Masatatsu; born 29 April 1916, date of death unknown) was a Japanese ice hockey player. He competed in the men's tournament at the 1936 Winter Olympics. Kitazawa is deceased.
