= Otto Heller (ice hockey) =

Swiss ice hockey player

- Born: 30 November 1914; Switzerland
- Position: Centre
- National team: Switzerland
- Playing career: 1933–1945

Otto "Ott" Heller (born 30 November 1914, date of death unknown) was a Swiss ice hockey player who competed for the Swiss national team at the 1936 Winter Olympics in Garmisch-Partenkirchen.
