= Susumu Hirano =

Japanese ice hockey player

Personal information
- Nationality: Japanese
- Born: 23 April 1910

Sport
- Sport: Ice hockey

Susumu Hirano (平野 進, Hirano Susumu; born 23 April 1910, date of death unknown) was a Japanese ice hockey player. He competed in the men's tournament at the 1936 Winter Olympics.
