= Toni Wiedemann =

German ice hockey player

- Born: December 30, 1911; Füssen, German Empire
- Died: 6 November 1953 (aged 41); Füssen, West Germany
- Position: Centre
- Shot: Left
- Played for: EV Füssen
- National team: Germany
- Playing career: 1931–1936

Anton Wiedemann (December 30, 1911 – November 6, 1953) was a German ice hockey player who competed for the German national team at the 1936 Winter Olympics in Garmisch-Partenkirchen. He played club hockey for EV Füssen.
