= Alois Kuhn =

German ice hockey player

- Born: 23 November 1910; Füssen, German Empire
- Died: 12 February 1996 (aged 85); Füssen, Germany
- Position: Right wing
- Shot: Left
- Played for: EV Füssen
- National team: Germany
- Playing career: 1928–1936

Alois Kuhn (23 November 1910 - 12 February 1996) was a German ice hockey player who competed for the German national team at the 1936 Winter Olympics in Garmisch-Partenkirchen. He played club hockey for EV Füssen.
