= Werner George =

German ice hockey player (born 1913)

- Born: 12 September 1913; Berlin, German Empire
- Position: Left wing
- Played for: Berliner Schlittschuhclub
- National team: Germany
- Playing career: ?–?

Werner George (born 12 September 1913, date of death unknown) was a German ice hockey player who competed for the German national team at the 1936 Winter Olympics in Garmisch-Partenkirchen. He played club hockey for Berliner Schlittschuhclub.
