= Rudi Ball =

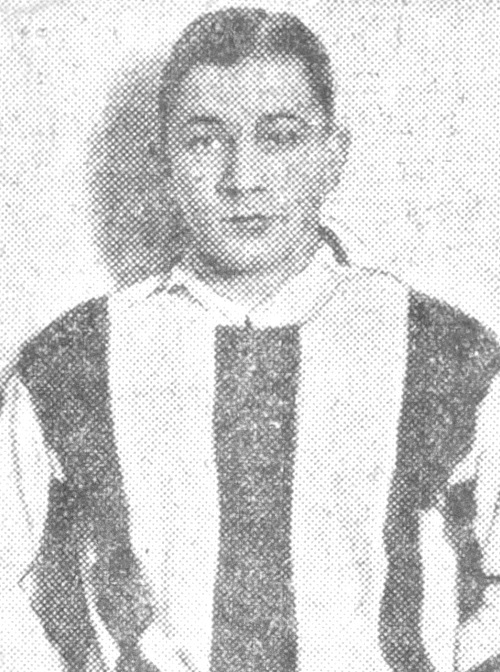
- Born: June 22, 1911 Berlin, Germany
- Died: September 19, 1975 (aged 64) Johannesburg, South Africa
- Height: 5 ft 4 in (163 cm)
- Weight: 140 lb (64 kg; 10 st 0 lb)
- Position: Right Wing
- Shot: Right
- National team: Germany
- Playing career: 1928–1952

Rudi Ball
Medal record

Representing Germany

Men's Ice hockey

Olympic Games
Bronze medal – third place	1932 Lake Placid	Team

World Championship
Silver medal – second place	1930 Chamonix/Vienna/Berlin	Team

Rudolf Victor "Rudi" Ball (June 22, 1911 – September 19, 1975) was a German ice hockey player. He played for the German national team at several international tournaments, including the 1936 Winter Olympics, where he was notably one of the only German Jewish athletes at the games. He is a member of the IIHF Hall of Fame.

== Early and personal life ==
Ball was born in Berlin, Germany. He had two older brothers, Gerhard and Heinz. His father Leonhard was a textile merchant and Jewish, while his mother, Gertrude, was Christian. In 1948 Ball moved to South Africa, and he died in Johannesburg in 1975.

== 1936 Winter Olympics ==
Because he was Jewish, Ball was initially denied inclusion on the German ice hockey team for the 1936 Winter Olympics at a time of Jewish persecution by the Nazi government. However, his friend and teammate Gustav Jaenecke refused to play unless Ball was included. Ball struck a deal to save his family in Germany if he returned to play in the games. The German authorities also realized that without Ball and Jaenecke, the team would not stand a chance of winning. When the Olympics opened, Ball was one of two Jewish athletes to represent Germany, along with Helene Mayer. One report at the time proposed that Ball was playing against his will. After Ball was injured, the Germans took fifth place. Ball played in four games and scored two goals.

He also represented Germany at the 1936 Summer Olympics in Berlin.

Ball followed his brother Heinz to South Africa in 1948. Ball died in Johannesburg in 1975.

Ball was inducted into the IIHF Hall of Fame in 2004.

== Career ==
During his playing career, spanning from 1928 to 1952, Ball won the German championship eight times (1928–1944) and participated for Germany in the 1932 and 1936 Winter Olympics and in four world championships between 1930 and 1938. The German team won the bronze medal in 1932 and Ball scored three goals. His brothers Gerhard and Heinz also played for the German national team in many international competitions.

He played in a total of 49 official games for Germany between 1929 and 1938, scoring 19 goals. Ball was voted as the best European ice hockey player by a French sports magazine in 1930. He was considered one of the most popular European ice hockey players prior to World War II. During his playing career he was 5 feet 4 inches (163 cm), and considered quick and had a good shot.

Ball scored more than 500 goals during his career. He was inducted into the International Ice Hockey Hall of Fame in 2004.

== Teams ==
=== International level ===
Germany – 1932 and 1936 Olympics
Germany – World Championships (1930, 1932 & 1938)

=== Club level ===
Berliner SC (1928–33)
EHC St. Moritz (1933–34)
Diavoli Rossi Neri (1934–36)
Berliner SC (1936–44)
SG Eichkamp Berlin (1946–48)
Tigers IHC (1949–50)
Wolves IHC (1950–51)

=== Awards ===
Olympic Bronze (1932)
World Championship Silver (1930)
European Championship Gold (1930)
World Championship Bronze (1932)
European Championship Bronze (1936 & 1938)
German Championships (eight between 1928 and 1944)
Spengler Cup (1928–29, 1934–35, 1935–36)
South African Championship (1951)
IIHF Hall of Fame (2004)

== See also ==
- List of select Jewish ice hockey players
