= Karl Kögel =

German ice hockey player (1917–1945)

- Born: 26 October 1917; Füssen, Germany
- Died: 1945 (aged 27–28); Italy
- Position: Left Wing
- Played for: EV Füssen
- National team: Germany
- Playing career: 1934–1943

Karl Georg Kögel (26 October 1917 – 1945) was a German ice hockey player who competed for the German national team at the 1936 Winter Olympics in Garmisch-Partenkirchen. He played club hockey for EV Füssen. Kögel died in 1945.
