= Herbert Schibukat =

German ice hockey player

- Born: 27 October 1914; Rastenburg, Germany
- Died: April 7, 1999 (aged 84); Eckernforde, Germany
- Position: Defence
- Shot: Left
- National team: Germany
- Playing career: 1933–1954

Herbert Schibukat (27 October 1914 – 7 April 1999) was a German ice hockey player. He represented Germany in the 1936 Winter Olympics and 1952 Winter Olympics.
