= Wilhelm Egginger =

German ice hockey player

- Born: April 6, 1912; Garmisch-Partenkirchen, German Empire
- Died: July 29, 1983 (aged 71); Munich, West Germany
- Position: Goaltender
- Caught: Right
- Played for: SC Riessersee
- National team: Germany
- Playing career: 1931–1947

Wilhelm Egginger (April 6, 1912 – July 29, 1983) was a German ice hockey player who competed for the German national team at the 1936 Winter Olympics in Garmisch-Partenkirchen. He played club hockey for SC Riessersee.
