= Gustav Jaenecke =

German ice hockey player (1908–1985)

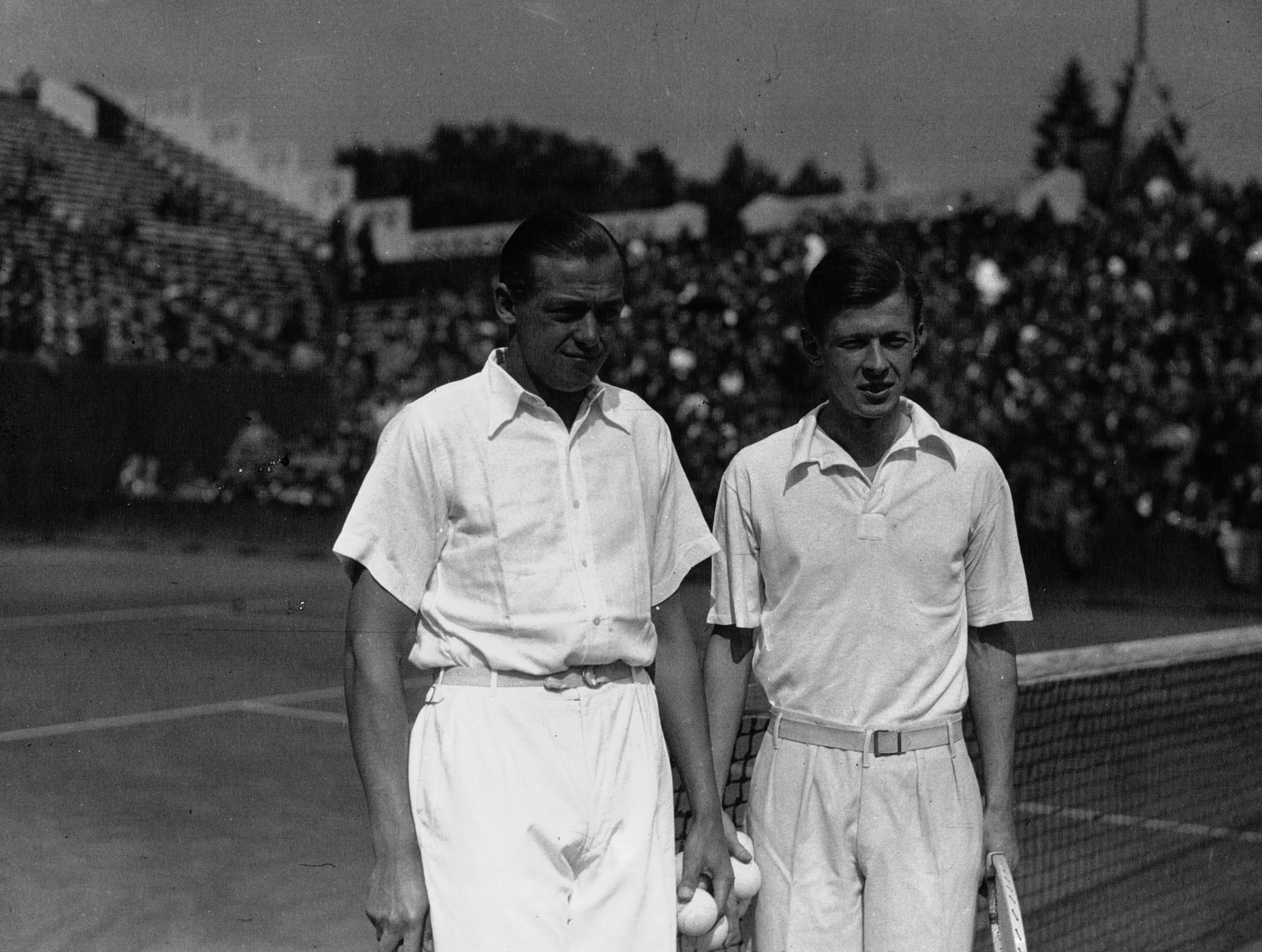
- Gustav Jaenecke (left) with Christian Boussus
- Born: 22 May 1908 Berlin, German Empire
- Died: 30 May 1985 (aged 77) Bonn, West Germany
- Height: 5 ft 10 in (178 cm)
- Weight: 170 lb (77 kg; 12 st 2 lb)
- Position: Left wing
- Shot: Left
- National team: Germany
- Playing career: 1923–1950

Olympic medal record

Men's Ice hockey

Representing Germany
Bronze medal – third place	1932 Lake Placid	Ice Hockey

Gustav Jaenecke (22 May 1908 – 30 May 1985) or Jänecke was a German ice hockey player who competed in the 1928 Winter Olympics, in the 1932 Winter Olympics, and in the 1936 Winter Olympics, and tennis player who played in three International Lawn Tennis Challenge ties for Germany.

He was born in Berlin, German Empire and died in Bonn, West Germany. He was inducted into the International Ice Hockey Federation Hall of Fame in 1998.

== Ice hockey ==
In 1928 he participated with the German ice hockey team, in the Olympic ice hockey tournament.

Four years later he won the bronze medal with the German team. He played all six matches and scored one goal.

In the 1933 World Ice Hockey Championships he scored two goals in a round-robin match against Poland in Group B of the European tournament draw.

In the 1935 World Ice Hockey Championships in Davos, Switzerland he scored two goals against Poland in the ninth-place game of the tournament.

At the 1936 Olympic ice hockey tournament he played all six matches and scored three goals. His teammate Rudi Ball was half-Jewish and thus was initially overlooked for selection in the German ice hockey team. Jaenecke, his good friend, refused to play unless Ball was included. With much controversy, Ball was finally included in the German team to play at the 1936 Olympic games.

He was inducted into the International Ice Hockey Federation Hall of Fame in 1998.

== Tennis ==
In 1931 he was ranked third on the German tennis rankings after reaching the final of the German Tennis Championships that year where he bowed to Roderich Menzel. Jaenecke played for Germany in the International Lawn Tennis Challenge ties against Italy (in the 1932 Europe Zone final), Japan and Egypt. The same year he won the German National Tennis Championships. In 1935 he was a runner-up for the national title again that time losing it to Gottfried von Cramm.

== Personal life ==
Jaenecke was the youngest son of a wealthy banker. He had three siblings. He took over his wife's family shoe factory in the early 1930s. In 1939, he published his autobiography Jagd hinter dem Puck. During the Second World War, the Nazi government ordered special shoes for people with disabilities from his company. Considered vital to the war effort, he could never be enlisted in the army and could stay in Berlin. At the end of the war, he was forced to abandon his factory located in the east of the city, which fell under Soviet control. He moved to Hannover and tried unsuccessfully to open a new shoe factory. With the intervention of a childhood friend, he became a member of the board of directors of a casino in Bad Neuenahr. It also managed the Redoute, a famous ballroom in Bad Godesberg, and Bonner Press Club, a group of journalists from Bonn. In 1975, he became the principal shareholder of Casino Berlin. The management company still bears his name.

Gustav Jaenecke married Elisabeth "Lisa" von Dobeneck, former wife of another German tennis star, Gottfried von Cramm. They divorced and Lisa married Wolfgang Amman.
