= Philipp Schenk =

German ice hockey player

- Born: 3 or 14 December 1914; Munich, German Empire
- Position: Centre
- Played for: SC Riessersee
- National team: Germany
- Playing career: 1933–1943

Philipp Schenk (born 3 or 14 December 1914; date of death unknown) was a German ice hockey player who competed for the German national team at the 1936 Winter Olympics in Garmisch-Partenkirchen. He played club hockey for SC Riessersee.
