= Paul Trautmann =

German ice hockey player

- Born: 16 December 1916; Berlin, German Empire
- Position: Right wing
- Played for: Berliner Schlittschuhclub
- National team: Germany
- Playing career: 1933–1944

Paul Trautmann (born 16 December 1916, date of death unknown) was a German ice hockey player who competed for the German national team at the 1936 Winter Olympics in Garmisch-Partenkirchen. He played club hockey for Berliner Schlittschuhclub.
