= Alpine skiing at the 1936 Winter Olympics – Men's combined =

Men's combined at the IV Olympic Winter Games
- Alpine skiing
- Venue: Kreuzjoch (downhill); Gudiberg (slalom); Garmisch-Partenkirchen, Germany
- Date: 7 February 1936 (downhill); 9 February 1936 (slalom)
- Competitors: 66 from 21 nations
- Winning time: 99.25 points (7:18.4)

Medalists
1st place, gold medalist(s)		Franz Pfnür	Germany
2nd place, silver medalist(s)		Gustav Lantschner	Germany
3rd place, bronze medalist(s)		Émile Allais	France

Men's Combined Downhill
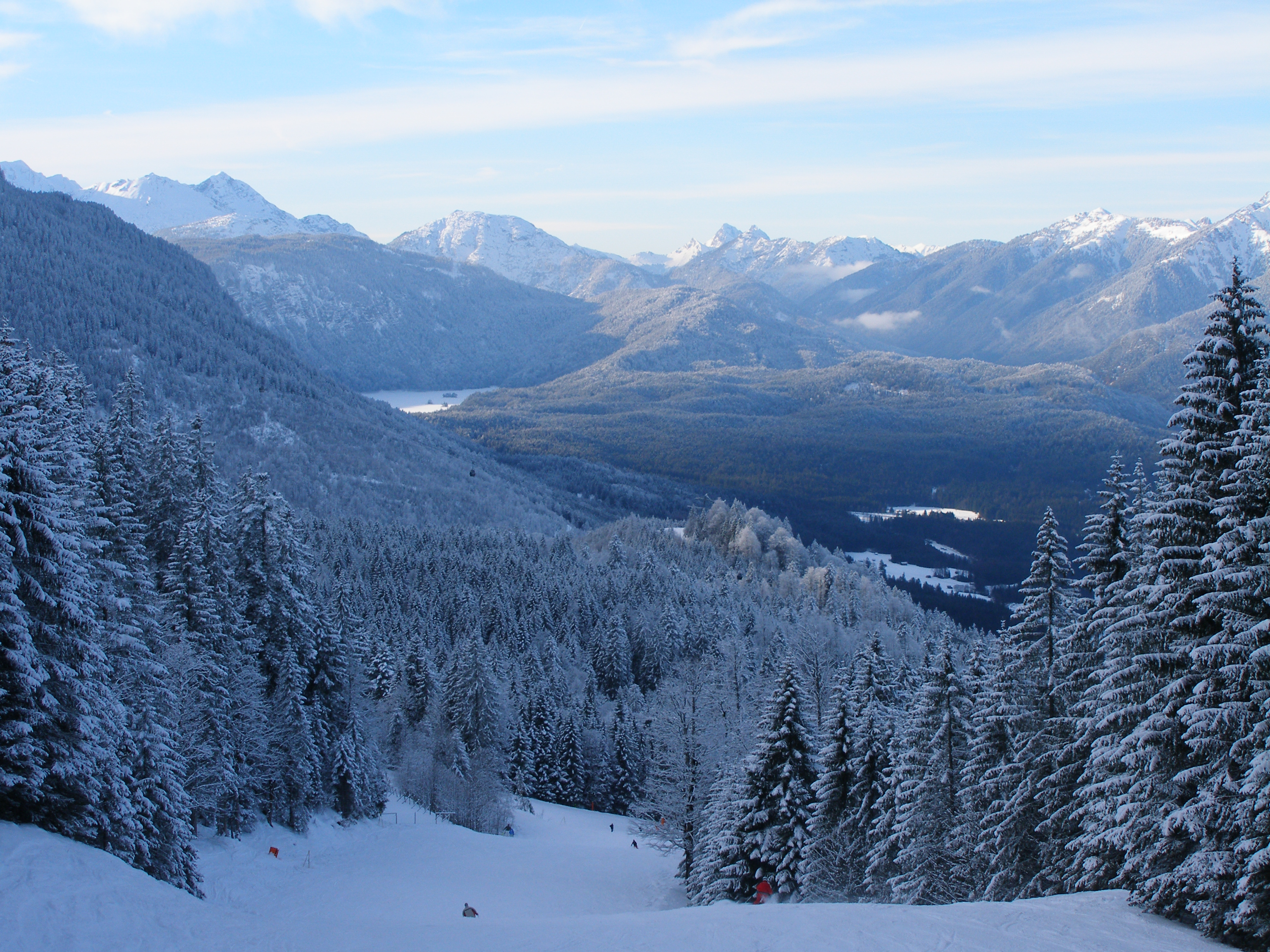
- Interactive map of Men's Combined; Downhill
- Location: Kreuzjoch
- Vertical: 959 m (3,146 ft)
- Top elevation: 1,719 m (5,640 ft)
- Base elevation: 760 m (2,493 ft)

Location in the Alps of Europe

The men's combined event was part of the alpine skiing programme at the 1936 Winter Olympics. It was the debut of alpine skiing at the Winter Olympics, and was the only men's event. The competition consisted of a downhill race on Friday, 7 February and two slalom heats on Sunday, 9 February.

Sixty-six alpine skiers from 21 nations competed. Notably absent were Austria and Switzerland.

== Downhill ==
The downhill race was held on Friday, 7 February, and the start was at the summit of Kreuzjoch at an elevation of 1,719 metres (5,640 ft). The finish was at the bottom station of the Kreuzeckbahn tramway at 760 m (2,493 ft) for a vertical drop of 959 m (3,146 ft) and a course length of 3.800 km (2.36 mi).

The race started at 12 noon. The conditions were good with temperatures at the start from −5 to −4 °C (23 to 25 °F). Birger Ruud of Norway had the best time at 4:47.4 for an average speed of 47.6 km/h (29.6 mph), with an average vertical descent rate of 3.34 m/s (11.0 ft/s). The women's downhill was run immediately prior at 11 am.

One racer was disqualified and five racers did not finish. James Riddell of Great Britain was injured after crashing into a tree.

Place	No.	Competitor	Time	Difference	Points
1	3	Birger Ruud (NOR)	4:47.4		100.00
2	5	Franz Pfnür (GER)	4:51.8	+4.4	98.49
3	1	Gustav Lantschner (GER)	4:58.2	+10.8	96.38
4	2	Émile Allais (FRA)	4:58.8	+11.4	96.18
5	9	Alf Konningen (NOR)	5:00.4	+13.0	95.67
6	8	Roman Wörndle (GER)	5:01.2	+13.8	95.42
7	6	Per Fossum (NOR)	5:03.2	+15.8	94.79
8	14	Rudolf Cranz (GER)	5:04.0	+16.6	94.54
9	21	Giacinto Sertorelli (ITA)	5:05.0	+17.6	94.23
10	23	Sigmund Ruud (NOR)	5:11.6	+24.2	92.23
11	31	Dick Durrance (USA)	5:16.2	+28.8	90.89
12	32	Vittorio Chierroni (ITA)	5:20.0	+32.6	89.81
13	64	Adriano Guarnieri (ITA)	5:26.4	+39.0	88.05
14	29	Maurice Lafforgue (FRA)	5:29.4	+42.0	87.25
15	7	Peter Lunn (GBR)	5:35.6	+48.2	85.64
16	24	Ciril Praček (YUG)	5:39.4	+52.0	84.68
16	28	Eduard Hromádka (TCH)	5:39.4	+52.0	84.68
18	19	George Page (USA)	5:42.8	+55.4	83.84
19	37	Walter Hollmann (TCH)	5:45.6	+58.2	83.16
20	11	Bronisław Czech (POL)	5:46.4	+59.0	82.97
21	15	Imre Csík (HUN)	5:48.2	+1:00.8	82.54
22	35	Roland Allard (FRA)	5:49.4	+1:02.0	82.26
23	16	Walter Pick (TCH)	5:49.6	+1:02.2	82.21
24	63	James Palmer-Tomkinson (GBR)	5:51.0	+1:03.6	81.88
25	55	Johann Knahl (TCH)	5:52.4	+1:05.0	81.56
26	13	Karl Baadsvik (CAN)	5:55.2	+1:07.8	80.91
27	27	Károly Kővári (HUN)	6:00.4	+1:13.0	79.74
28	22	Horst Scheeser (ROU)	6:03.4	+1:16.0	79.09
29	50	Robert Livermore (USA)	6:04.4	+1:17.0	78.87
30	20	Borislav Jordanov (BUL)	6:06.4	+1:19.0	78.44
31	54	Franci Čop (YUG)	6:13.6	+1:26.2	76.93
32	67	László Szalay (HUN)	6:14.4	+1:27.0	76.76
33	56	Wilhelm Zacharias (ROU)	6:16.2	+1:28.8	76.40
34	34	Karol Zając (POL)	6:20.6	+1:33.2	75.51
35	47	Bertil Persson (SWE)	6:26.0	+1:38.6	74.46
35	53	Fedor Weinschenck (POL)	6:26.0	+1:38.6	74.46
37	66	Albert Washburn (USA)	6:30.8	+1:43.4	73.54
38	51	Levente Balatoni (HUN)	6:36.6	+1:49.2	72.47
39	26	William Ball (CAN)	6:40.6	+1:53.2	71.74
40	46	Sydney Hudson (GBR)	6:41.4	+1:54.0	71.60
41	69	Isamu Sekiguchi (JPN)	6:48.6	+2:01.2	70.34
42	58	Raymond de Braconnier (BEL)	6:52.0	+2:04.6	69.76
43	39	Dimitrios Negrepontis (GRE)	6:58.6	+2:11.2	68.66
44	25	Werner De Spoelberch (BEL)	7:03.0	+2:15.6	67.94
45	38	Rudolf Kloeckner (ROU)	7:16.4	+2:29.0	65.86
46	44	Tsutomu Sekido (JPN)	7:23.4	+2:36.0	64.82
47	62	William Clark (CAN)	7:29.0	+2:41.6	64.01
48	33	Iosif Covaci (ROU)	7:56.8	+3:09.4	60.28
49	61	Hiroshi Tadano (JPN)	7:58.6	+3:11.2	60.05
50	36	Emil Žnidar (YUG)	8:02.2	+3:14.8	59.60
51	60	Hubert Negele (LIE)	8:09.4	+3:22.0	58.72
52	41	Jacques Peten (BEL)	10:09.2	+5:21.8	47.18
53	59	Asen Zankov (BUL)	10:53.2	+6:05.8	44.00
54	43	Franz Schädler (LIE)	11:59.8	+7:12.4	39.93
55	40	Herberts Bērtulsons (LAT)	13:00.6	+8:13.2	36.82
56	57	Askolds Hermanovskis (LAT)	13:22.4	+8:35.0	35.82
57	49	Nazım Aslangil (TUR)	13:56.8	+9:09.4	34.35
58	68	Ülker Pamir (TUR)	14:18.4	+9:31.0	33.48
59	65	Mehmut Şevket Karman (TUR)	14:29.2	+9:41.8	33.06
60	70	Reşat Erceş (TUR)	22:44.4	+17:57.0	21.06
–	42	Boyan Dimitrov (BUL)	–	–	DQ
–	52	Raoul Weckbecker (LUX)	–	–	DNF
–	48	Rolando Zanni (ITA)	–	–	DNF
–	12	Charles Bracht (BEL)	–	–	DNF
–	10	Hubert Hajm (YUG)	–	–	DNF
–	4	James Riddell (GBR)	–	–	DNF
–	17	René Lafforgue (FRA)	–	–	DNS
–	18	Gustaf Larsson (SWE)	–	–	DNS
–	30	Sven Eriksson (SWE)	–	–	DNS
–	45	Tormod Mobraaten (CAN)	–	–	DNS

== Slalom ==
Men's Combined Slalom
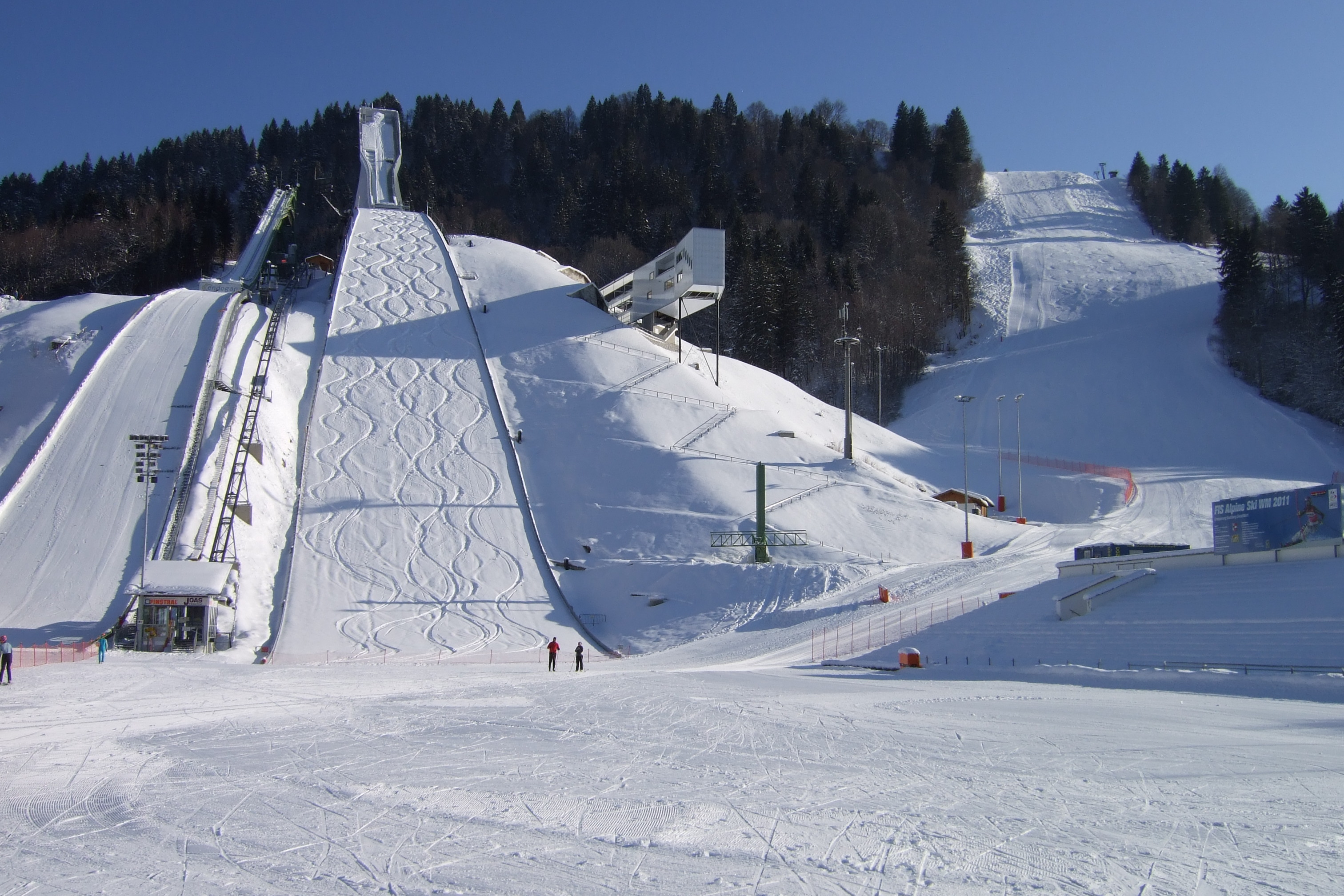
- Interactive map of Men's Combined; Slalom
- Location: Gudiberg
- Vertical: 200 m (656 ft)
- Top elevation: 950 m (3,117 ft)
- Base elevation: 750 m (2,461 ft)

The slalom race was held on Sunday, 9 February 1936 on the slalom slope at Gudiberg.

The conditions were good with temperatures of −7 to −5 °C (19 to 23 °F). The vertical drop was 200 metres (656 ft) and the length of the course was 600 metres (0.37 mi) with 33 gates. Rather than disqualification, penalties were added to the finishing time when competitors missed a gate.

The race started at 11 a.m. and the competitors started in the finish order of the downhill race. Downhill winner Birger Ruud was the first racer on the slalom course, but finished sixth in the slalom portion and fourth overall.

After the first run of slalom, the jury decided which competitors were allowed to continue, so only 33 racers competed in the second run.

Place	Downhill	No.	Competitor	1st run	2nd run	Time	Difference	Points
1	2	5	Franz Pfnür (GER)	72.1	74.5	146.6		100.00
2	3	1	Gustav Lantschner (GER)	76.9	75.6	152.2	+5.6	96.13
3	4	2	Émile Allais (FRA)	80.4	76.9	157.3	+10.7	93.20
4	8	14	Rudolf Cranz (GER)	92.9(2)	74.6	167.5	+20.9	87.52
5	6	8	Roman Wörndle (GER)	82.9	85.8(1)	168.7	+22.1	86.90
6	1	3	Birger Ruud (NOR)	91.9(1)	77.1	169.0	+22.4	86.75
7	9	21	Giacinto Sertorelli (ITA)	79.3	90.1	169.4	+22.8	86.54
8	11	31	Dick Durrance (USA)	86.4(1)	86.9	173.3	+26.7	84.59
9	5	9	Alf Konningen (NOR)	89.3	84.3	173.6	+27.0	84.45
10	14	29	Maurice Lafforgue (FRA)	86.6	87.1	173.7	+27.1	84.40
11	24	63	James Palmer-Tomkinson (GBR)	89.8	86.5	176.3	+29.7	83.15
12	32	67	László Szalay (HUN)	87.6	89.9	177.5	+30.9	82.59
13	15	7	Peter Lunn (GBR)	86.3	92.5	178.8	+32.2	81.99
14	18	19	George Page (USA)	85.7	93.4	179.3	+32.7	81.86
15	7	6	Per Fossum (NOR)	90.3	89.7	180.0	+33.4	81.44
16	19	37	Walter Hollmann (TCH)	88.1	97.8	185.9	+39.3	78.86
17	16	24	Ciril Praček (YUG)	94.4	92.6	187.0	+40.4	78.40
18	40	46	Sydney Hudson (GBR)	89.9	102.4	192.3	+45.7	76.24
19	20	11	Bronisław Czech (POL)	90.4	102.9	193.3	+46.7	75.84
20	29	50	Robert Livermore (USA)	97.5	96.7	194.2	+47.6	75.49
21	25	55	Johann Knahl (TCH)	93.7	101.1	194.8	+48.2	75.26
22	31	54	Franci Čop (YUG)	98.5	97.4	195.9	+49.3	74.83
23	34	34	Karol Zając (POL)	95.0	102.5	197.5	+50.9	74.23
24	28	22	Horst Scheeser (ROU)	101.6	96.5	198.1	+51.5	74.00
25	13	64	Adriano Guarnieri (ITA)	88.5(1)	110.1(1)	198.6	+52.0	73.82
26	22	35	Roland Allard (FRA)	104.8	94.8	199.6	+53.0	73.45
27	12	32	Vittorio Chierroni (ITA)	93.4	110.8(2)	202.2	+55.6	71.79
28	27	27	Károly Kővári (HUN)	104.8	103.6	208.4	+61.8	70.35
29	23	16	Wilhelm Pick (TCH)	113.3(1)	101.1	214.4	+67.8	68.38
30	35	47	Bertil Persson (SWE)	103.4(1)	114.0(1)	217.4	+70.8	67.43
31	50	36	Emil Žnidar (YUG)	110.7	118.1	228.8	+82.2	64.07
32	21	15	Imre Csík (HUN)	108.5	128.2	236.7	+90.1	61.93
33	36	53	Fedor Weinschenck (POL)	116.6(1)	141.2	257.8	+111.2	56.87
–	33	56	Wilhelm Zacharias (ROU)	100.2	–			–
–	49	61	Hiroshi Tadano (JPN)	109.4	–			–
–	41	69	Isamo Sekiguchi (JPN)	112.5	–			–
–	45	38	Rudolf Klöckner (ROU)	112.7	–			–
–	26	13	Karl Baadsvik (CAN)	114.3	–			–
–	37	66	Albert Washburn (USA)	116.7(1)	–			–
–	47	62	William Clark (CAN)	123.9(1)	–			–
–	46	44	Tsutomu Sekido (JPN)	124.5	–			–
–	30	20	Borislav Jordanov (BUL)	126.1(1)	–			–
–	39	26	William Ball (CAN)	127.7	–			–
–	48	33	Iosif Covaci (ROU)	128.3	–			–
–	53	59	Asen Zankov (BUL)	133.5	–			–
–	43	39	Dimitris Negropontis (GRE)	135.3	–			–
–	51	60	Hubert Negele (LIE)	136.1	–			–
–	42	58	Raymond De Braconnier (BEL)	142.2	–			–
–	52	41	Jacques Peten (BEL)	144.9(1)	–			–
–	44	25	Werner De Spoelberch (BEL)	148.6	–			–
–	54	43	Franz Schädler (LIE)	152.5	–			–
–	17	28	Eduard Hromádka (TCH)	165.9(3)	–			–
–	55	40	Herbert Bērtulsons (LAT)	186.1	–			–
–	56	57	Askolds Hermanovskis (LAT)	198.0(2)	–			–
–	57	49	Nazım Aslangil (TUR)	DQ	–			–
–	58	68	Ülker Pamir (TUR)	DQ	–			–
–	10	23	Sigmund Ruud (NOR)	DNS	–			–
–	38	51	Levente Balatoni (HUN)	DNS	–			–
–	59	65	Mahmut Şevket (TUR)	DNS	–			–
–	60	70	Reşat Erceş (TUR)	DNS	–			–

(1) 6 seconds penalty added

(2) 12 seconds penalty added

(3) 18 seconds penalty added

== Final standings ==
After the downhill race and the two slalom runs, the points results were averaged to determine the winner.

Place	No.	Competitor	Downhill	Slalom	Average
1st place, gold medalist(s)	5	Franz Pfnür (GER)	98.49	100.00	99.25
2nd place, silver medalist(s)	1	Gustav Lantschner (GER)	96.38	96.13	96.26
3rd place, bronze medalist(s)	2	Émile Allais (FRA)	96.18	93.20	94.69
4	3	Birger Ruud (NOR)	100.00	86.75	93.38
5	8	Roman Wörndle (GER)	95.42	86.90	91.16
6	14	Rudolf Cranz (GER)	94.54	87.52	91.03
7	21	Giacinto Sertorelli (ITA)	94.23	86.54	90.39
8	9	Alf Konningen (NOR)	95.67	84.45	90.06
9	6	Per Fossum (NOR)	94.79	81.44	88.12
10	31	Dick Durrance (USA)	90.89	84.59	87.74
11	29	Maurice Lafforgue (FRA)	87.25	84.40	85.83
12	7	Peter Lunn (GBR)	85.64	81.99	83.82
13	19	George Page (USA)	83.84	81.86	82.85
14	63	James Palmer-Tomkinson (GBR)	81.88	83.15	82.52
15	24	Ciril Praček (YUG)	84.68	78.40	81.54
16	37	Walter Hollmann (TCH)	83.16	78.86	81.01
17	64	Adriano Guarnieri (ITA)	88.05	73.82	80.94
18	32	Vittorio Chierroni (ITA)	89.81	71.79	80.80
19	67	László Szalay (HUN)	76.76	82.59	79.68
20	11	Bronisław Czech (POL)	82.97	75.84	79.41
21	55	Johann Knahl (TCH)	81.56	75.26	78.41
22	35	Roland Allard (FRA)	82.26	73.45	77.86
23	50	Robert Livermore (USA)	78.87	75.49	77.18
24	22	Horst Scheeser (ROU)	79.09	74.00	76.55
25	54	Franci Čop (YUG)	76.93	74.83	75.88
26	16	Wilhelm Pick (TCH)	82.21	68.38	75.30
27	27	Károly Kővári (HUN)	79.74	70.35	75.05
28	34	Karol Zając (POL)	75.51	74.23	74.87
29	46	Sydney Hudson (GBR)	71.60	76.24	73.92
30	15	Imre Csík (HUN)	82.54	61.93	72.24
31	47	Bertil Persson (SWE)	74.46	67.43	70.95
32	53	Fedor Weinschenck (POL)	74.46	56.87	65.67
33	36	Emil Žnidar (YUG)	59.60	64.07	61.84
