= Italy at the 1936 Winter Olympics =

- IOC code: ITA
- NOC: Italian National Olympic Committee
- Website: www.coni.it (in Italian)

in Garmisch-Partenkirchen
- Competitors: 40 (35 men, 5 women) in 7 sports
- Flag bearer: Adriano Guarnieri
- Medals: Gold 0 Silver 0 Bronze 0 Total 0

Winter Olympics appearances (overview)
- 1924; 1928; 1932; 1936; 1948; 1952; 1956; 1960; 1964; 1968; 1972; 1976; 1980; 1984; 1988; 1992; 1994; 1998; 2002; 2006; 2010; 2014; 2018; 2022; 2026

Italy competed at the 1936 Winter Olympics in Garmisch-Partenkirchen, Germany.

== Alpine skiing ==
Men

Athlete	Event	Downhill		Slalom			Total	
Athlete	Event	Time	Rank	Time 1	Time 2	Rank	Total points	Rank
Rolando Zanni	Combined	DNF	–	–	–	–	DNF	–
Adriano Guarnieri	Combined	5:26.4	13	1:28.5 (+0:06)	1:50.1 (+0:06)	25	80.94	17
Vittorio Chierroni	Combined	5:20.0	12	1:33.4	1:50.8 (+0:12)	27	80.80	18
Cinto Sertorelli	Combined	5:05.0	9	1:19.3	1:30.1	7	90.39	7

Women

Athlete	Event	Downhill		Slalom			Total	
Athlete	Event	Time	Rank	Time 1	Time 2	Rank	Total points	Rank
Iseline Crivelli	Combined	7:24.4	27	2:04.0	DSQ	–	DNF	–
Nives Dei Rossi	Combined	7:03.2	24	1:51.8	2:04.3 (+0:06)	22	66.06	24
Frida Clara	Combined	6:16.8	16	1:38.1	1:35.1	9	77.17	12
Paula Wiesinger	Combined	5:55.2	10	1:54.4	2:07.8 (+0:12)	24	72.19	16

== Bobsleigh ==
Sled	Athletes	Event	Run 1		Run 2		Run 3		Run 4		Total	
Sled	Athletes	Event	Time	Rank	Time	Rank	Time	Rank	Time	Rank	Time	Rank
ITA-1	Antonio Brivio; Carlo Solveni	Two-man	1:33.38	19	1:27.85	18	1:25.78	5	1:24.20	9	5:51.21	12
ITA-2	Edgardo Vaghi; Dario Poggi	Two-man	1:30.03	10	1:25.66	13	1:29.04	11	1:26.29	14	5:51.02	11

Sled	Athletes	Event	Run 1		Run 2		Run 3		Run 4		Total	
Sled	Athletes	Event	Time	Rank	Time	Rank	Time	Rank	Time	Rank	Time	Rank
ITA-1	Antonio Brivio; Carlo Solveni; Emilio Dell'Oro; Raffaele Manardi	Four-man	1:26.96	12	1:22.46	7	1:20.98	6	1:20.67	7	5:31.07	10
ITA-2	Francesco de Zanna; Ernesto Franceschi; Uberto Gillarduzzi; Amedeo Angeli	Four-man	1:23.02	5	DNF	–	–	–	–	–	DNF	–

== Cross-country skiing ==
Men

Event	Athlete	Race	
Event	Athlete	Time	Rank
18 km	Raffaele Nasi	1'32:12	52
18 km	Giulio Gerardi	1'21:25	19
18 km	Severino Menardi	1'20:34	16
18 km	Vincenzo Demetz	1'20:06	13
50 km	Giacomo Scalet	4'01:54	22
50 km	Tobia Senoner	3'57:16	17
50 km	Vincenzo Demetz	3'56:47	16
50 km	Giovanni Kasebacher	3'53:08	13

Men's 4 x 10 km relay

Athletes	Race	
Athletes	Time	Rank
Giulio Gerardi; Severino Menardi; Vincenzo Demetz; Giovanni Kasebacher	2'50:05	4

== Figure skating ==
Pairs

Athletes	Points	Score	Final rank
Anna Cattaneo; Ercole Cattaneo	93	9.1	9

== Ice hockey ==
=== Group B ===
Top two teams advanced to semifinals

	Pld	W	L	T	GF	GA	Pts
Germany	3	2	1	0	5	1	4
United States	3	2	1	0	5	2	4
Italy	3	1	2	0	2	5	2
Switzerland	3	1	2	0	1	5	2

7 February	Germany	3–0 (1–0, 1–0, 1–0)	Italy
8 February	United States	1–2 (0–0, 0–0, 1–1, 0–0, 0–1)	Italy
9 February	Switzerland	1–0 (0–0, 1–0, 0–0)	Italy

Contestants; Augusto Gerosa; Franco Rossi; Gianmario Baroni; Decio Trovati; Camillo Mussi; Giovanni Scotti; Ignazio Dionisi; Mario Zucchini; Mario Maiocchi; Carlo Zucchini

== Nordic combined ==
Events:

- 18 km cross-country skiing
- normal hill ski jumping

The cross-country skiing part of this event was combined with the main medal event of cross-country skiing. Those results can be found above in this article in the cross-country skiing section. Some athletes (but not all) entered in both the cross-country skiing and Nordic combined event, their time on the 18 km was used for both events.

The ski jumping (normal hill) event was held separate from the main medal event of ski jumping, results can be found in the table below.

Athlete	Event	Cross-country			Ski Jumping				Total	
Athlete	Event	Time	Points	Rank	Distance 1	Distance 2	Total points	Rank	Points	Rank
Andrea Vuerich	Individual	1'25:01	186.7	14	DNS	–	–	–	DNF	–
Severino Menardi	Individual	1'20:34	211.0	5	37.5	40.0	157.3	40	368.3	20

== Ski jumping ==
Athlete	Event	Jump 1			Jump 2			Total	
Athlete	Event	Distance	Points	Rank	Distance	Points	Rank	Points	Rank
Mario Bonomo	Normal hill	DNS	–	–	–	–	–	DNF	–
Bruno Da Col	Normal hill	59.0	87.8	39	61.0	91.8	36	179.6	37

== Sources ==
- von le Fort, Peter, ed. (1936). IV. Olympische Winterspiele 1936 Amtlicher Bericht (PDF) (in German). Berlin: Reichssportverlag. Archived from the original (PDF) on 2007-08-09.
- Olympic Winter Games 1936, full results by sports-reference.com
