= Hungary at the 1936 Winter Olympics =

- IOC code: HUN
- NOC: Hungarian Olympic Committee
- Website: www.olimpia.hu (in Hungarian and English)

in Garmisch-Partenkirchen
- Competitors: 25 (22 men and 3 women) in 5 sports
- Flag bearer: Levente Balatoni
- Medals Ranked 10th: Gold 0 Silver 0 Bronze 1 Total 1

Winter Olympics appearances (overview)
- 1924; 1928; 1932; 1936; 1948; 1952; 1956; 1960; 1964; 1968; 1972; 1976; 1980; 1984; 1988; 1992; 1994; 1998; 2002; 2006; 2010; 2014; 2018; 2022; 2026

Hungary competed at the 1936 Winter Olympics in Garmisch-Partenkirchen, Germany.

== Medalists ==
Medal	Name	Sport	Event
Bronze	Emilia Rotter; László Szollás	Figure skating	Pairs

== Alpine skiing ==
Men

Athlete	Event	Downhill		Slalom			Total	
Athlete	Event	Time	Rank	Time 1	Time 2	Rank	Total points	Rank
Levente Balatoni	Combined	6:36.6	38	DNF	–	–	DNF	–
László Szalay	Combined	6:14.4	32	1:27.6	1:29.9	12	79.68	19
Károly Kővári	Combined	6:00.4	27	1:44.8	1:43.6	28	75.05	27
Imre Csík	Combined	5:48.2	21	1:48.5	2:08.2	32	72.24	30

== Figure skating ==
Men

Athlete	Event	CF	FS	Places	Points	Final rank
Dénes Pataky	Men's singles	7	11	60	374.8	9
Elemér Terták	Men's singles	9	8	56	379.0	8

Women

Athlete	Event	CF	FS	Places	Points	Final rank
Éva von Botond	Women's singles	11	17	106	356.1	15

Pairs

Athletes	Points	Score	Final rank
Piroska Szekrényessy; Attila Szekrényessy	38.5	10.6	4
Emília Rotter; László Szollás	32.5	10.8	3rd place, bronze medalist(s)

== Ice hockey ==
=== Group C ===
Top two teams advanced to semifinals

	Pld	W	L	T	GF	GA	Pts
Czechoslovakia	3	3	0	0	10	0	6
Hungary	3	2	1	0	14	5	4
France	3	1	2	0	4	7	2
Belgium	3	0	3	0	4	20	0

6 February	Hungary	11-2 (1-1,2-0,8-1)	Belgium
7 February	Hungary	3-0 (0-0,1-0,2-0)	France
8 February	Czechoslovakia	3-0 (1-0,1-0,1-0)	Hungary

=== Group A ===
Top two teams advanced to Medal Round.

	Pld	W	L	T	GF	GA	Pts
Great Britain	3	2	0	1	8	3	5
Canada	3	2	1	0	22	4	4
Germany	3	1	1	1	5	8	3
Hungary	3	0	3	0	2	22	0

11 February	Germany	2-1 (0-0,1-0,1-1)	Hungary
12 February	Canada	15-0 (3-0,9-0,3-0)	Hungary
13 February	Great Britain	5-1 (1-0,3-1,1-0)	Hungary

- Team Roster

- István Hircsák
- Ferenc Monostori
- Miklós Barcza
- László Róna
- Frigyes Helmeczi
- Sándor Minder
- András Gergely
- László Gergely
- Béla Háray
- Zoltán Jeney
- Sándor Miklos
- Ferenc Szmosi
- Mátyás Farkas
- György Margó

== Nordic combined ==
Events:

- 18 km cross-country skiing
- normal hill ski jumping

The cross-country skiing part of this event was combined with the main medal event of cross-country skiing. Those results can be found above in this article in the cross-country skiing section. Some athletes (but not all) entered in both the cross-country skiing and Nordic combined event, their time on the 18 km was used for both events.

The ski jumping (normal hill) event was held separate from the main medal event of ski jumping, results can be found in the table below.

Athlete	Event	Cross-country			Ski Jumping				Total	
Athlete	Event	Time	Points	Rank	Distance 1	Distance 2	Total points	Rank	Points	Rank
László Szalay	Individual	DNF	–	–	–	–	–	–	DNF	–
Károly Kovári	Individual	DNF	–	–	–	–	–	–	DNF	–

== Speed skating ==
Men

Event	Athlete	Race	
Event	Athlete	Time	Rank
1500 m	László Hídvéghy	2:29.0	25
5000 m	László Hídvéghy	8:53.2	17
10,000 m	László Hídvéghy	18:04.0	14

== Sources ==
- Peter von le Fort, ed. (1936). IV. Olympische Winterspiele 1936 Amtlicher Bericht (PDF) (in German). Berlin: Reichssportverlag. Archived from the original (PDF) on 2007-08-09.
- "Olympic Medal Winners". International Olympic Committee.
- Olympic Winter Games 1936, full results by sports-reference.com
