= Venues of the 1936 Winter Olympics =

For the 1936 Winter Olympics in Garmisch-Partenkirchen, Germany, a total of six sports venues were used. Alpine skiing events took place for the first time and were held in three different locations. Riessersee held the speed skating and some of the ice hockey matches while the bobsleigh events took place south of the lake. The ski jump and its neighboring stadium played host to the cross-country skiing, Nordic combined, and ski jumping events. Even though figure skating and some of the ice hockey matches took place outdoors at the ice stadium, the ice itself was artificially refrigerated to prevent ice thawing.

== Venues ==
Venue	Sports	Capacity	Ref.
Große Olympiaschanze	Cross-country skiing, Nordic combined, opening and closing ceremonies, Ski jumping	59,280 (78,306 on opening & closing ceremonies)	
Gudiberg	Alpine skiing (combined - slalom)	21,041	
Kreuzjoch	Alpine skiing (combined - downhill)	Not listed.	
Kreuzeck	Alpine skiing (downhill finish line)	9,367	
Olympia-Kunsteisstadion	Figure skating, Ice hockey (final)	8,644	
Bob Run Riessersee	Bobsleigh	8,970	
Riessersee (Lake)	Ice hockey, Speed skating	8,430	

== Before the Olympics ==
The first ski jump in Garmisch-Partenkirchen was constructed in 1902. A permanent structure was completed in 1934 in time for the 1936 Games. Bobsleigh took place in Garmisch as early as 1910. The track used for the 1936 Games was completed in 1934. The first Bobsleigh World Championships that took place at the track was in 1934 in the four-man event. The ice stadium was constructed in only 106 days in 1934. The 60 by 30 m (197 by 98 ft) rink was supported by 22 km (14 mi) of steel piping to keep the rink at a consistent temperature. A 300 kW (400 hp) chiller was used to keep the rink frozen at a consistent temperature.

== During the Olympics ==
The speed skating and some of the ice hockey matches took place at Reissersee near the hotels located on the east side of the lake. In the forest south of the lake was where the bobsleigh track was located. During the men's singles figure skating event, judge John Machado of Canada contracted pneumonia after being outdoors in six hours of inclement weather and had to be replaced.

== After the Olympics ==
Since the 1952-53 ski jumping season, the jump has been part of the Four Hills Tournament. It has hosted a ski jumping event every New Year's Day since 1953. The jump was renovated in 1978 before being demolished in April 2007. A new venue was constructed during the rest of that year with it being opened and dedicated for use during the 2007–08 Four Hills Tournament on New Year's Day 2008.

The bobsleigh track hosted the FIBT World Championships in 1938 (four-man), 1953, and 1962 before being demolished in 1966.

The ice stadium was converted into an indoor arena in 1964, renovated between 1990 and 1994, and is now known as Olympia Eissport Zentrum Garmisch-Partenkirchen (English: Olympic Ice Sport Center of Garmisch-Partenkirchen).

Garmisch became a popular alpine skiing venue, hosting the FIS Alpine World Ski Championships in 1978 and 2011. It was part of Munich's unsuccessful bid for the 2018 Winter Olympics to host all of the skiing events (alpine, cross-country, freestyle, Nordic combined, snowboarding, and ski jumping) for those games should the city that hosted the 1972 Summer Olympics be awarded the games in July 2011.
