= Czechoslovakia at the 1936 Winter Olympics =

- IOC code: TCH
- NOC: Czechoslovak Olympic Committee

in Garmisch-Partenkirchen
- Competitors: 48 in 9 sports
- Medals: Gold 0 Silver 0 Bronze 0 Total 0

Winter Olympics appearances (overview)
- 1924; 1928; 1932; 1936; 1948; 1952; 1956; 1960; 1964; 1968; 1972; 1976; 1980; 1984; 1988; 1992

Other related appearances
- Czech Republic (1994–pres.); Slovakia (1994–pres.)

Czechoslovakia competed at the 1936 Winter Olympics in Garmisch-Partenkirchen, Germany.

== Alpine skiing ==
Athlete	Event	Downhill			Slalom					Total	
Athlete	Event	Time	Points	Rank	Time 1	Time 2	Total	Points	Rank	Total points	Rank
Walter Hollmann	Men's combined	5:45.6	83.16	19	1:28.1	1:37.8	3:05.9	78.86	16	81.01	16
Eduard Hromádka	Men's combined	5:39.4	84.68	16	2:45.9	did not finish					
Johann Knahl	Men's combined	5:52.4	81.56	21	1:33.7	1:41.1	3:14.8	75.26	21	78.41	21
Walter Pick	Men's combined	5:49.6	82.21	23	1:53.3	1:41.1	3:34.4	68.38	29	75.30	26

== Bobsleigh ==
Athlete	Event	Run 1		Run 2		Run 3		Run 4		Total	
Athlete	Event	Time	Rank	Time	Rank	Time	Rank	Time	Rank	Time	Rank
Gustav Leubner; Wilhelm Blechschmidt	Two-man	1:32.53	18	1:29.23	20	1:31.59	15	1:26.12	13	5:59.47	17
Josef Lanzendörfer; Karel Růžička	Two-man	1:31.40	14	1:28.90	19	1:36.57	23	1:32.83	21	6:09.70	20
Gustav Leubner; Bedřich Poselt; Wilhelm Blechschmidt; Walter Heinzl	Four-man	1:26.68	11	1:25.60	11	1:28.13	13	1:25.11	12	5:45.52	12
Josef Lanzendörfer; Ewald Menzl; Robert Zintel; Karel Růžička	Four-man	did not finish									

== Cross-country skiing ==
Athlete	Event	Race	
Athlete	Event	Time	Rank
Gustl Berauer	18 km	1:23:04	21
Lukáš Mihalák	18 km	1:19:01	10
Lukáš Mihalák	50 km	did not finish	
Cyril Musil	18 km	1:20:14	14
Cyril Musil	50 km	3:46:12	9
František Šimůnek	18 km	1:19:09	11
Vladimír Novák	50 km	3:59:08	19
Jan Svatoš	50 km	3:54:33	15
Cyril Musil; Gustl Berauer; Lukáš Mihalák; František Šimůnek	4x10 km relay	2:51:56	5

== Figure skating ==
Athlete(s)	Event	CF	FS	TO	Points	Rank
Jaroslav Sadílek	Men's	22	24	161	2135.1	24
Věra Hrubá	Ladies'	20	13	111	2473.0	17
Fritzi Metznerová	Ladies'	21	20	141	2374.5	20

== Ice hockey ==
- Roster:
  - Goalkeepers: Jan Peka, Josef Boháč
  - Defenders: Jaroslav Pušbauer, Jan Košek, Karel Hromádka
  - Forwards: Josef Maleček (5 goals scored), Jiří Tožička (1), Oldřich Kučera (4), Ladislav Troják, Zdeněk Jirotka (3), Drahoš Jirotka (3), Alois Cetkovský, Walter Ullrich

First round
Group C

	Pld	W	T	L	GF	GA	Pts
Czechoslovakia	3	3	0	0	10	0	6
Hungary	3	2	0	1	14	5	4
France	3	1	0	2	4	7	2
Belgium	3	0	0	3	4	20	0

7 February	Czechoslovakia	5-0 (0-0,4-0,1-0)	Belgium
8 February	Czechoslovakia	3-0 (1-0,1-0,1-0)	Hungary
9 February	Czechoslovakia	2-0 (0-0,1-0,1-0)	France

Second round
Group B

	Pld	W	T	L	GF	GA	Pts
United States	3	3	0	0	5	1	6
Czechoslovakia	3	2	0	1	6	4	4
Sweden	3	1	0	2	3	6	2
Austria	3	0	0	3	1	4	0

11 February	United States	2-0 (0-0,2-0,0-0)	Czechoslovakia	12 February	Czechoslovakia	4-1 (0-1,2-0,2-0)	Sweden
13 February	Czechoslovakia	2-1 (0-0,2-1,0-0)	Austria

Final round

	Pld	W	T	L	GF	GA	Pts
Great Britain	3	2	1	0	7	1	5
Canada	3	2	0	1	9	2	4
United States	3	1	1	1	2	1	3
Czechoslovakia	3	0	0	3	0	14	0

14 February	Great Britain	5-0 (2-0,3-0,0-0)	Czechoslovakia
15 February	Canada	7-0 (3-0,3-0,1-0)	Czechoslovakia

The second-round game against the United States was carried over to the final round.

== Nordic combined ==
Athlete	Event	Cross-country			Ski jumping		Total	
Athlete	Event	Time	Rank	Points	Points	Rank	Points	Rank
Gustl Berauer	Individual	1:23:04	197..2	8	181.9	29	379.1	14
Johann Lahr	Individual	1:25:11	185.8	16	201.6	8	387.4	9
František Šimůnek	Individual	1:19:09	219.0	4	175.3	33	394.3	5
Rudolf Vrána	Individual	1:30:26	158.8	34	200.6	9	359.4	26

== Ski jumping ==
Athlete	Event	Jump 1		Jump 2		Total	
Athlete	Event	Distance	Rank	Distance	Rank	Points	Rank
Oldřich Buďárek	Normal hill	85.3	44	88.9	38	174.2	40
Josef Kahl	Normal hill	98.4	29	97.7	32	196.1	29
Johann Lahr	Normal hill	94.7	37	99.1	28	193.8	32
Jaroslav Lukeš	Normal hill	99.2	27	99.9	26	199.1	27

== Speed skating ==
Men

Athlete	Event	Final	
Athlete	Event	Time	Rank
Oldřich Hanč	500 m	49.8	32
Oldřich Hanč	1500 m	2:57.8	35
Oldřich Hanč	5000 m	10:03.0	34
Jaromír Turnovský	500 m	47.8	30
Jaromír Turnovský	1500 m	2:30.5	31
Jaromír Turnovský	5000 m	9:25.8	32
