= Romania at the 1936 Winter Olympics =

- IOC code: ROU
- NOC: Romanian Olympic and Sports Committee
- Website: www.cosr.ro (in Romanian, English, and French)

in Garmisch-Partenkirchen
- Competitors: 15 (14 men, 1 woman) in 5 sports
- Medals: Gold 0 Silver 0 Bronze 0 Total 0

Winter Olympics appearances (overview)
- 1928; 1932; 1936; 1948; 1952; 1956; 1960; 1964; 1968; 1972; 1976; 1980; 1984; 1988; 1992; 1994; 1998; 2002; 2006; 2010; 2014; 2018; 2022; 2026

Romania competed at the 1936 Winter Olympics in Garmisch-Partenkirchen, Germany.

== Alpine skiing ==
Men

Athlete	Event	Downhill		Slalom			Total	
Athlete	Event	Time	Rank	Time 1	Time 2	Rank	Total points	Rank
Iosif Covaci	Combined	7:56.8	48	2:08.3	DSQ	–	DNF	–
Rudolf Kloeckner	Combined	7:16.4	45	1:52.7	DSQ	–	DNF	–
Wilhelm Zaharias	Combined	6:16.2	33	1:40.2	DSQ	–	DNF	–
Horst Scheeser	Combined	6:03.4	28	1:41.6	1:36.5	24	76.55	24

== Bobsleigh ==
Sled	Athletes	Event	Run 1		Run 2		Run 3		Run 4		Total	
Sled	Athletes	Event	Time	Rank	Time	Rank	Time	Rank	Time	Rank	Time	Rank
ROU-1	Alexandru Frimu; Tita Rădulescu	Two-man	1:29.96	9	1:27.26	16	1:34.06	17	1:24.73	10	5:56.01	15
ROU-2	Alexandru Budişteanu; Dumitru Gheorghiu	Two-man	1:30.37	11	1:27.58	17	1:34.11	19	1:26.85	15	5:58.91	16

Sled	Athletes	Event	Run 1		Run 2		Run 3		Run 4		Total	
Sled	Athletes	Event	Time	Rank	Time	Rank	Time	Rank	Time	Rank	Time	Rank
ROU-1	Emil Angelescu; Dumitru Gheorghiu; Teodor Popescu; Alexandru Tautu	Four-man	DNF	–	–	–	–	–	–	–	DNF	–
ROU-2	Alexandru Budişteanu; Tita Rădulescu; Alexandru Ionescu; Aurel Mărăcescu	Four-man	1:31.81	15	1:28.37	13	1:25.21	11	DNF	–	DNF	–

== Cross-country skiing ==
Men

Event	Athlete	Race	
Event	Athlete	Time	Rank
18 km	Iosif Covaci	1'37:23	61
18 km	Ioan Coman	1'36:21	60

Men's 4 x 10 km relay

Athletes	Race	
Athletes	Time	Rank
Wilhelm Zacharias; Iosif Covaci; Ioan Coman; Rudolf Klöckner	3'27:50	14

== Figure skating ==
Men

Athlete	Event	CF	FS	Places	Points	Final rank
Roman Turuşanco	Men's singles	21	14	128	337.8	19

Pairs

Athletes	Points	Score	Final rank
Irina Timcic; Alfred Eisenbeisser-Ferraru	102	9.0	13

== Ski jumping ==
Athlete	Event	Jump 1			Jump 2			Total	
Athlete	Event	Distance	Points	Rank	Distance	Points	Rank	Points	Rank
Hubert Sandor Clompe	Normal hill	58.0	88.2	38	59.0	85.8	42	174.0	41
