= List of Winter Olympics venues: H–K =

For the Winter Olympics, there are six venues starting with the letter 'H', five venues starting with the letter 'I', three venues starting with the letter 'J', and ten venues starting with the letter 'K'.

== H ==
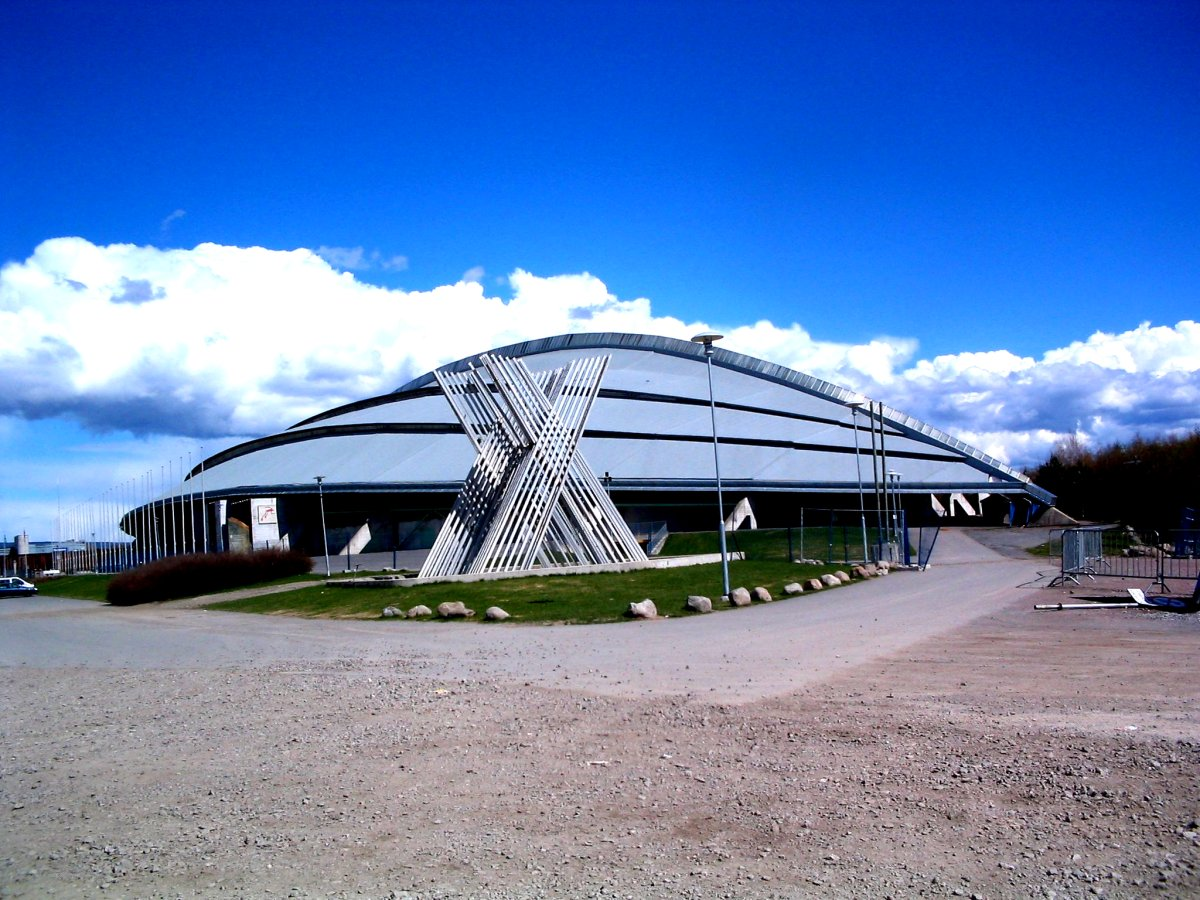
Hamar Olympic Hall hosted the speed skating events for the 1994 Winter Olympics in Lillehammer.

Venue	Games	Sports	Capacity	Ref.
Håkon Hall	1994 Lillehammer	Ice hockey (final)	10,500	
Hakuba Ski Jumping Stadium	1998 Nagano	Nordic combined (ski jumping), Ski jumping	45,000	
Hamar Olympic Amphitheatre	1994 Lillehammer	Figure skating, Short track speed skating	6,000	
Hamar Olympic Hall	1994 Lillehammer	Speed skating	10,600	
Happo'one Resort	1998 Nagano	Alpine skiing (downhill, super g, combined)	20,000	
Holmenkollen National Arena	1952 Oslo	Cross-country skiing, Nordic combined, Ski jumping	150,000	

== I ==
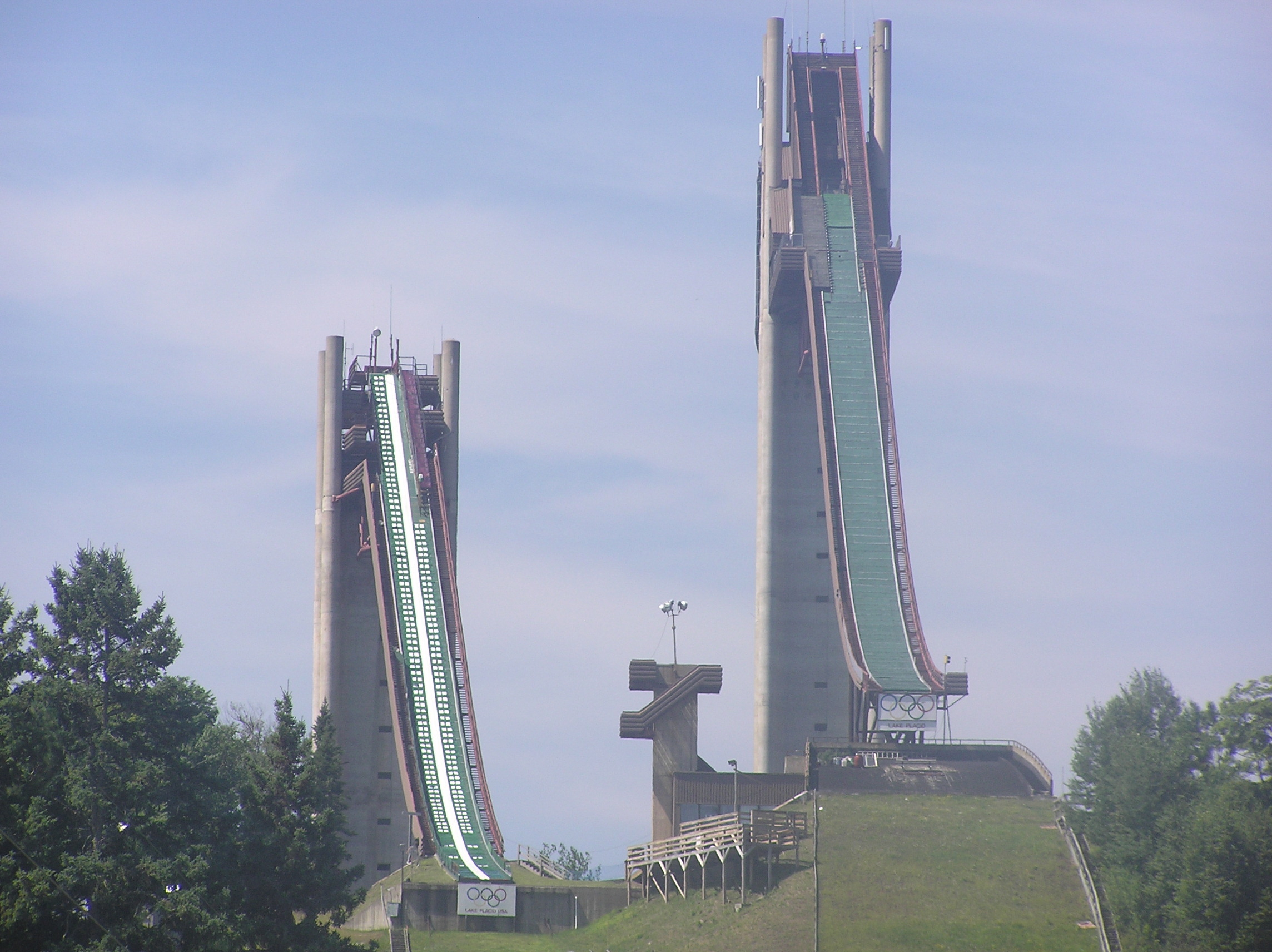
Intervales Ski-Hill hosted the ski jumping and ski jumping part of Nordic combined for both the 1932 and 1980 Winter Olympics held in Lake Placid.

Venue	Games	Sports	Capacity	Ref.
Igman, Malo Polje	1984 Sarajevo	Nordic combined (ski jumping), Ski jumping	Not listed.	
Igman, Veliko Polje	1984 Sarajevo	Biathlon, Cross-country skiing, Nordic combined (Cross-country skiing)	Not listed.	
Iizuna Kogen Ski Area	1998 Nagano	Freestyle skiing	12,000	
Intervales Ski-Hill	1932 Lake Placid	Nordic combined (ski jumping), Ski jumping	9200	
Intervales Ski-Hill	1980 Lake Placid	Nordic combined (ski jumping), Ski jumping	18,000	

== J ==
Venue	Games	Sports	Capacity	Ref.
Jahorina ski resort	1984 Sarajevo	Alpine skiing (women)	10,000	
James B. Sheffield Speed Skating Oval	1980 Lake Placid	Speed skating	Not listed.	
Jordal Amfi	1952 Oslo	Ice hockey (final)	10,000	

== K ==
Venue	Games	Sports	Capacity	Ref.
Kadettangen	1952 Oslo	Ice hockey	Not listed	
Kanbayashi Snowboard Park	1998 Nagano	Snowboarding (halfpipe)	10,000	
Kanthaugen Freestyle Arena	1994 Lillehammer	Freestyle skiing	15,000	
Kazakoshi Park Arena	1998 Nagano	Curling	1,924	
Kombinierte Kunsteisbahn für Bob-Rodel Igls	1976 Innsbruck	Bobsleigh, Luge	Not listed.	
Koševo Stadium	1984 Sarajevo	Opening ceremonies	50,000	
Kreuzjoch	1936 Garmisch-Partenkirchen	Alpine skiing (combined - downhill)	Not listed.	
Kreuzeck	1936 Garmisch-Partenkirchen	Alpine skiing (downhill finish line)	17,000	
Korketrekkeren	1952 Oslo	Bobsleigh	Not listed	
Kulm	1948 St. Moritz	Ice hockey	Not listed.	
