= Garmisch Classic =

Ski resort in Bavaria, Germany

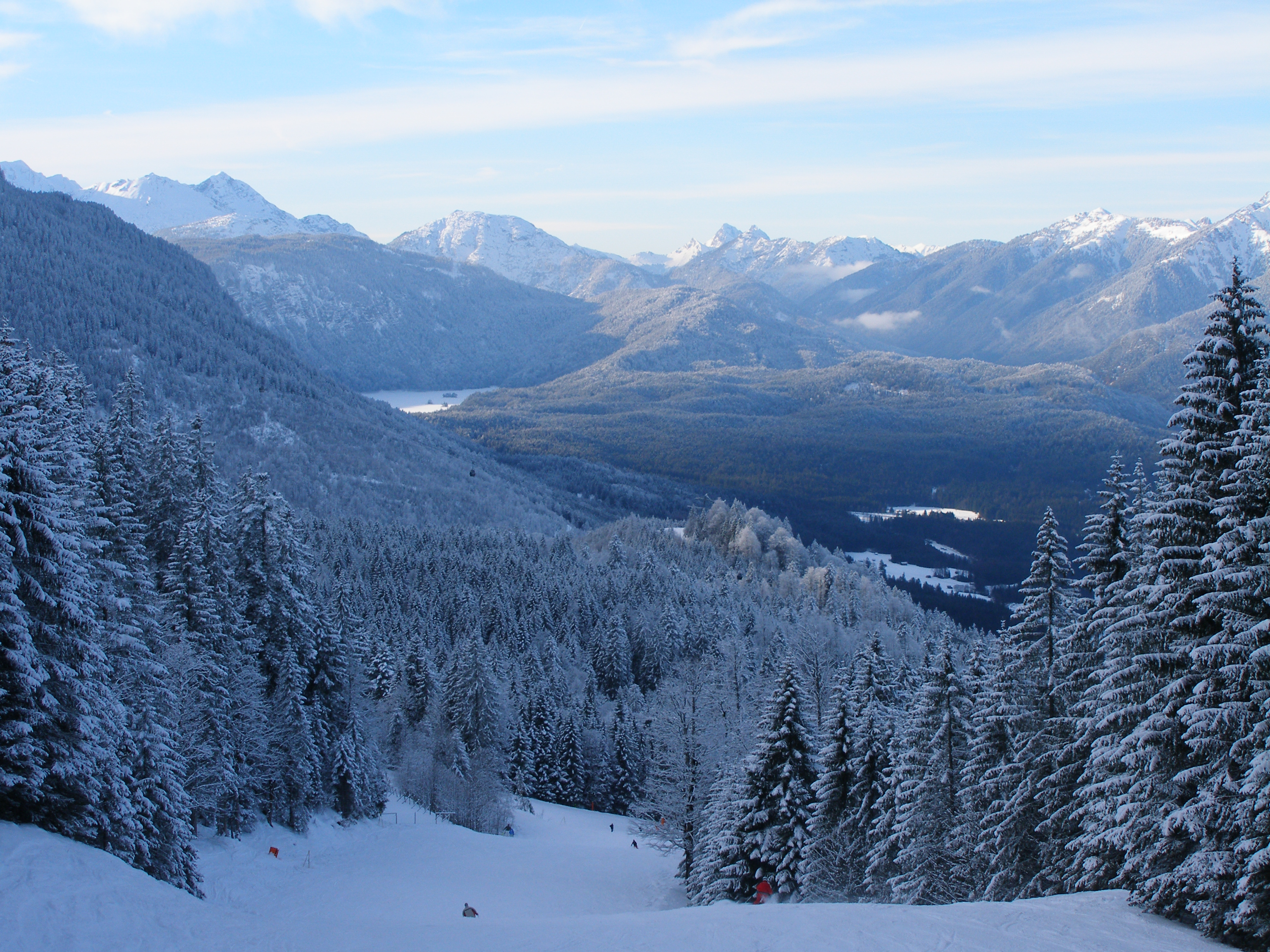
- Kandahar course in January 2008

- Location in Germany Garmisch Classic (Alps)
- Location: Garmisch-Partenkirchen; Bavaria, Germany
- Nearest city: Innsbruck, Austria; Munich, Germany
- Coordinates: 47.471°N 11.064°E
- Vertical: 1,350 m (4,429 ft)
- Top elevation: 2,050 m (6,726 ft)
- Base elevation: 700 m (2,297 ft)
- Trails: 40 km (25 mi): 17% easy - (blue); 60% intermediate - (red); 23% difficult - (black)
- Lift system: 2 aerial trams 2 gondolas 4 chairlifts 10 surface lifts
- Snowmaking: 30 km (19 mi)
- Website: Garmisch Classic

Garmisch Classic is an alpine ski area in the Bavarian Alps of southern Germany, near Garmisch-Partenkirchen, Bavaria. Its maximum elevation is 2,050 m (6,726 ft) above sea level at Osterfelderkopf, with a vertical drop of 1,350 m (4,429 ft). Other peaks of ski area are the Kreuzjoch at 1,719 m (5,640 ft) and Kreuzeck at 1,651 m (5,417 ft).

The area hosted the World Championships in 2011 and 1978, and alpine skiing debuted at the Winter Olympics here in 1936. Run only as a combined event in 1936, the downhill portion was run at Garmisch Classic and the slalom was run at Gudiberg, adjacent to the ski jumps (Große Olympiaschanze). Garmisch Classic is known for the classic Kandahar slope, descending from Kreuzjoch, where the speed events are held for the World Cup and World Championships.

Skiing is also available above Garmisch Classic on the Zugspitzplatt, a glacial plateau below the summit of the Zugspitze, the highest point in Germany at 2,962 m (9,718 ft). The lift-served summit for skiing is 2,720 m (8,924 ft), descending to 2,000 m (6,562 ft), for a vertical drop of 720 m (2,362 ft).

== Video ==
- YouTube.com – a trip down the Kandahar course – 2012
- YouTube.com – Didier Cuche wins 2012 World Cup downhill at Garmisch Classic (Kandahar 1)
- YouTube.com – Lindsey Vonn wins 2012 World Cup downhill at Garmisch Classic (Kandahar 2)
