= Monostori =

Monostori is a surname occurring in Hungary. Notable people with the surname include:

- Attila Monostori (1971–2025), Hungarian water polo player
- Ferenc Monostori (1909–2008), Hungarian ice hockey player
- Tivadar Monostori (1936–2014), Hungarian football player and manager

== See also ==
- Fort Monostor (Hungarian: Monostori Erőd), a fort close to the city of Komárom, Hungary
