= Ciril Praček =

Slovenian alpine skier (1913–2000)

Ciril Praček (March 27, 1913 – October 25, 2000) was a Slovenian alpine skier who competed for the Kingdom of Yugoslavia in the 1936 Winter Olympics and for the SFR of Yugoslavia in the 1948 Winter Olympics. He was born in Jesenice. In 1936 he finished 15th in the alpine skiing combined event.
