= Franco Rossi =

Franco Rossi may refer to:

- Franco Rossi (director) (1919–2000), Italian director
- Franco Rossi (athlete), Italian Paralympic athlete
- Franco Rossi (ice hockey) (1916–2006), Italian ice hockey player
- Franco Rossi (footballer) (born 2002), Uruguayan footballer
- Franco Rossi, Jr., American actor
- Franco Rossi (musician), Italian cellist

== See also ==
- Francesco Rosi (1922–2015), Italian film director
- Franco Rosso (1941–2016), Italian-born film producer and director
