= Fedor Weinschenk =

Polish skier (1916–1942)

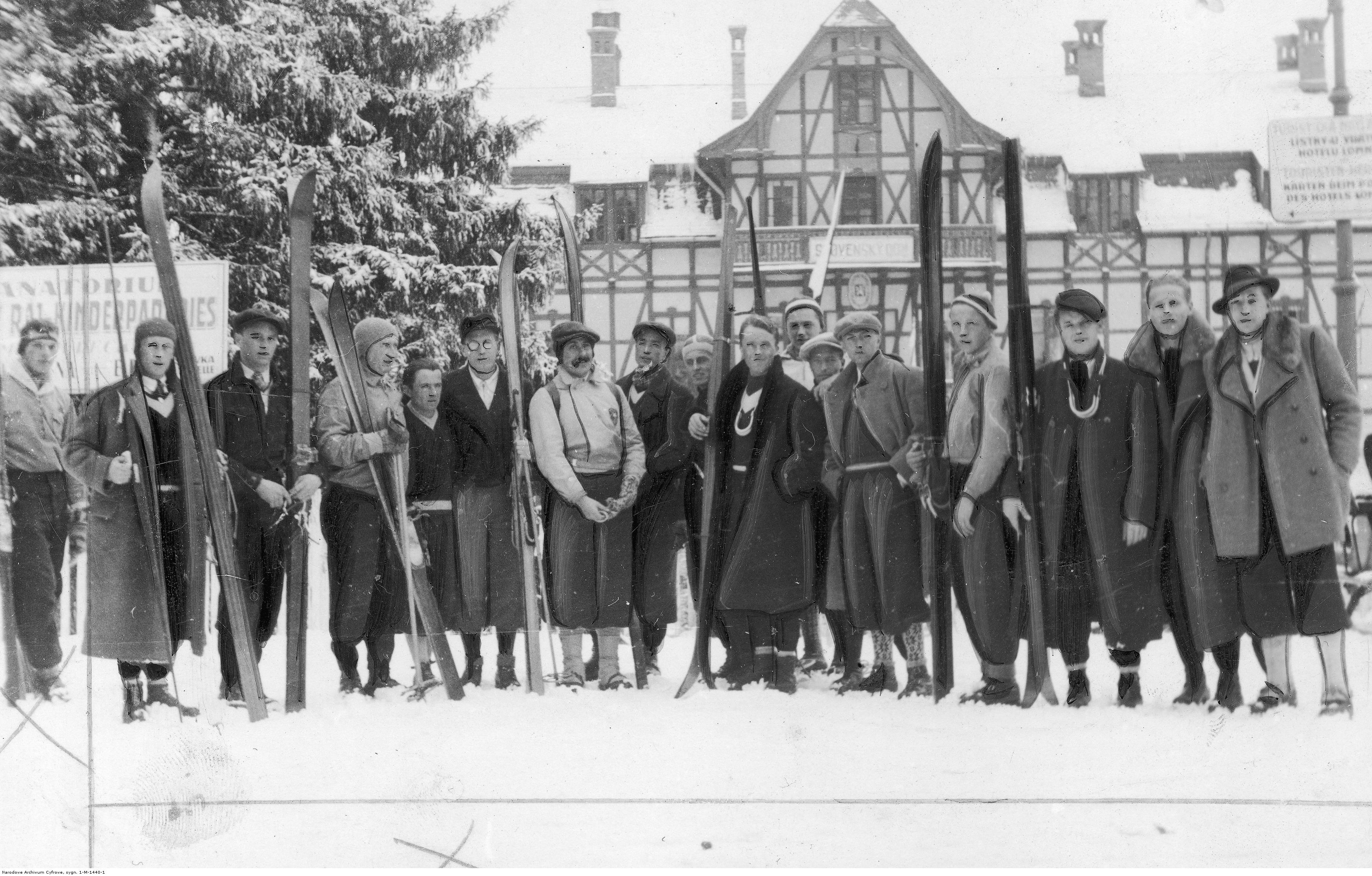
- Fedor Weinschenk (right) 1935

Personal information
- Nationality: Polish
- Born: 4 January 1916; Bielitz, Austrian Silesia, Austria-Hungary
- Died: 22 June 1942 (aged 26); Eastern Front, Soviet Union

Sport
- Sport: Alpine skiing

Fedor Wilhelm Weinschenk (4 January 1916 – 22 June 1942) was a Polish alpine skier. He competed in the men's combined event at the 1936 Winter Olympics.

Weinschenk was of German ethnicity, competing for the local German Bielsko skiing club. During World War II, he was drafted to Wehrmacht and fought on the Eastern Front, where he was declared as missing on 22 June 1942. This was confirmed also by his family after the war.
