= Robert Livermore (alpine skier) =

American alpine skier (1909–1991)

Personal information
- Nationality: American
- Born: October 16, 1909 Boston, Massachusetts, United States
- Died: February 12, 1991 (aged 81) Lincoln, Massachusetts, United States

Sport
- Sport: Alpine skiing

Robert Livermore (October 16, 1909 – February 12, 1991) was an American alpine skier. He competed in the men's combined event at the 1936 Winter Olympics. He graduated from Harvard University.
