= Alf Konningen =

Norwegian alpine skier (1901–1978)

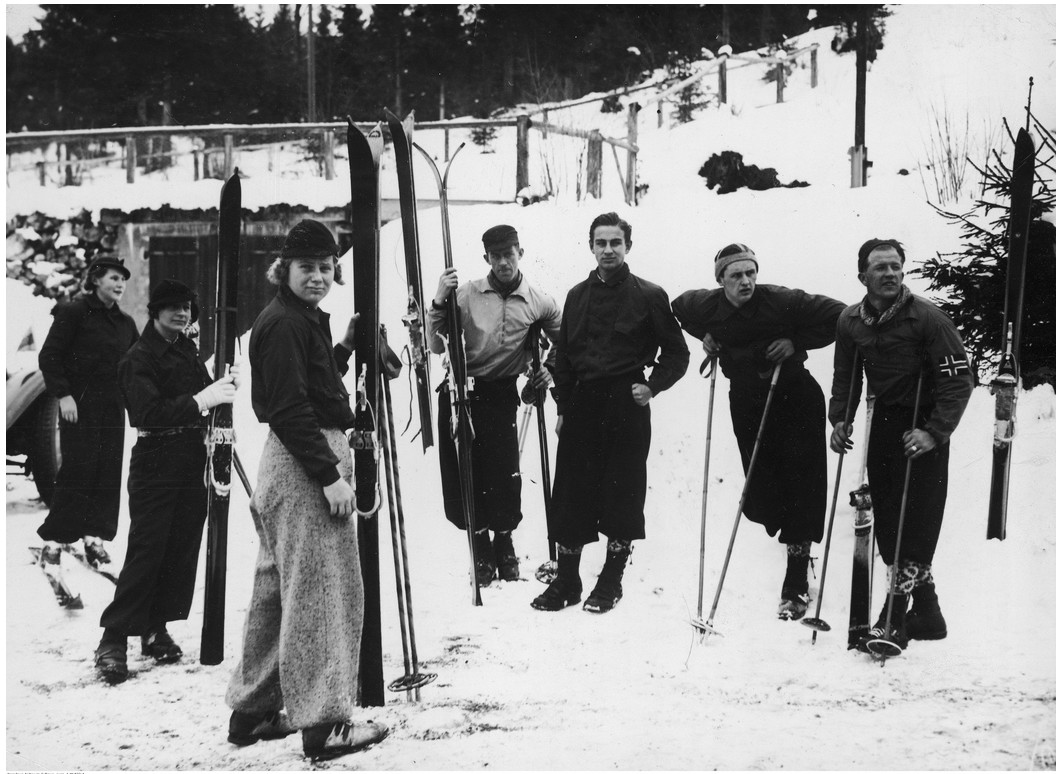
Alf Konnigen and others in Norway 1936

Alf Konningen (26 June 1901 – 27 January 1978) was a Norwegian alpine skier who competed in the 1936 Winter Olympics. His first victory was in 1934 when he won the downhill competition in his hometown Kongsberg.

In 1936 he finished eighth in the alpine skiing combined event.

Born in Kongsberg, he represented Kongsberg IF.

In his retirement he worked as lathe operator in Kongsberg.
