= Boyan Dimitrov =

Bulgarian alpine skier

Personal information
- Nationality: Bulgarian
- Born: 10 June 1916

Sport
- Sport: Alpine skiing

Boyan Dimitrov (Bulgarian: Боян Димитров, born 10 June 1916, date of death unknown) was a Bulgarian alpine skier. He competed in the men's combined event at the 1936 Winter Olympics.
