= Alpine skiing at the 1936 Winter Olympics =

Alpine Skiing at the IV Olympic Winter Games
- Venue: Kreuzjoch (downhill); Gudiberg (slalom); Garmisch-Partenkirchen, Bavaria, Germany
- Dates: 7–9 February 1936
- Competitors: 103 from 26 nations

At the 1936 Winter Olympics at Garmisch-Partenkirchen, Germany, alpine skiing was arranged for the first time in the Olympics, a combined event for men and women.

Both downhills were run on Kreuzjoch on Friday, 7 February, with the women at 11:00 and the men at noon. The two-run slalom races were run on the weekend at Gudiberg with the women's event on Saturday and the men's on Sunday.

== Medal summary ==
Event	Gold		Silver		Bronze	
Men's combined	Franz Pfnür; Germany	99.25	Gustav Lantschner; Germany	96.26	Émile Allais; France	94.69
Women's combined	Christl Cranz; Germany	97.06	Käthe Grasegger; Germany	95.26	Laila Schou Nilsen; Norway	93.48

== Medal table ==
Rank	Nation	Gold	Silver	Bronze	Total
1	Germany	2	2	0	4
2	France	0	0	1	1
2	Norway	0	0	1	1
Totals (3 entries)		2	2	2	6

== Course information ==
Date	Race	Start Elevation	Finish Elevation	Vertical Drop	Course Length	Average Gradient
Fri 7 Feb	Downhill – (K) – men	1,719 m (5,640 ft)	760 m (2,493 ft)	959 m (3,146 ft)	3.800 km (2.361 mi)	25.2%
Fri 7 Feb	Downhill – (K) – women	1,580 m (5,184 ft)	760 m (2,493 ft)	820 m (2,690 ft)	3.300 km (2.051 mi)	24.8%
Sun 9 Feb	Slalom – (K) – men	950 m (3,117 ft)	750 m (2,461 ft)	200 m (656 ft)	0.600 km (0.373 mi)	33.3%
Sat 8 Feb	Slalom – (K) – women	950 m (3,117 ft)	750 m (2,461 ft)	200 m (656 ft)	0.600 km (0.373 mi)	33.3%

== Participating nations ==
Eight nations had both female and male alpine skiers participating. Austria, Estonia, the Netherlands, Spain, and Switzerland only competed with female alpine skiers.

A total of 103 alpine skiers (66 men and 37 women) from 26 nations (men from 21 nations and women from 13 nations) competed at the Garmisch-Partenkirchen Games:

- Austria (4) (men:0 women:4)
- Belgium (4) (men:4 women:0)
- Bulgaria (3) (men:3 women:0)
- Canada (7) (men:3 women:4)
- Czechoslovakia (7) (men:4 women:3)
- Estonia (1) (men:0 women:1)
- France (3) (men:3 women:0)
- Germany (8) (men:4 women:4)
- Great Britain (8) (men:4 women:4)
- Greece (1) (men:1 women:0)
- Hungary (4) (men:4 women:0)
- Italy (8) (men:4 women:4)
- Japan (3) (men:3 women:0)

- Latvia (3) (men:2 women:1)
- Liechtenstein (2) (men:2 women:0)
- Luxembourg (1) (men:1 women:0)
- Netherlands (1) (men:0 women:1)
- Norway (7) (men:4 women:3)
- Poland (3) (men:3 women:0)
- Romania (4) (men:4 women:0)
- Spain (2) (men:0 women:2)
- Sweden (1) (men:1 women:0)
- Switzerland (2) (men:0 women:2)
- Turkey (4) (men:4 women:0)
- United States (8) (men:4 women:4)
- Yugoslavia (4) (men:4 women:0)
