= Emil Žnidar =

Slovenian alpine skier (1914–1977)

Personal information
- Nationality: Slovenian
- Born: 27 February 1914; Slovenski Javornik, Austria-Hungary
- Died: February 1977; Jesenice, Yugoslavia

Sport
- Sport: Alpine skiing

Emil Žnidar (27 February 1914 – February 1977) was a Slovenian alpine skier. He competed in the men's combined event at the 1936 Winter Olympics, representing Yugoslavia.
