= Franz Schädler =

Franz Schädler may refer to:

- Franz Schädler (footballer) (born 1968), former Liechtenstein football midfielder
- Franz Schädler (alpine skier) (born 1917), Liechtenstein former alpine skier
