= Nazım Aslangil =

Turkish alpine skier

Personal information
- Nationality: Turkish
- Born: 10 January 1911

Sport
- Sport: Alpine skiing

Nazım Aslangil (born 10 January 1911, date of death unknown) was a Turkish alpine skier. He competed in the men's combined event at the 1936 Winter Olympics.
