= Werner de Spoelberch =

Belgian skier (1902–1987)

Personal information
- Nationality: Belgian
- Born: 24 January 1902; Brussels, Belgium
- Died: 10 September 1987 (aged 85); Haacht, Belgium

Sport
- Sport: Alpine skiing

Werner Viscount de Spoelberch (24 January 1902 – 10 September 1987) was a Belgian alpine skier. He competed in the men's combined event at the 1936 Winter Olympics.
