= Isamu Sekiguchi =

Japanese alpine skier

Personal information
- Nationality: Japanese
- Born: 28 October 1910; Otaru, Japan

Sport
- Sport: Alpine skiing

Isamu Sekiguchi (関口 勇, Sekiguchi Isamu, born 28 October 1910) was a Japanese alpine skier. He competed in the men's combined event at the 1936 Winter Olympics.
