= Roman Wörndle =

German alpine skier (1913–1942)

Medal record

Representing Germany

Men's Alpine skiing

World Championship
Bronze medal – third place	1937 Chamonix	Slalom

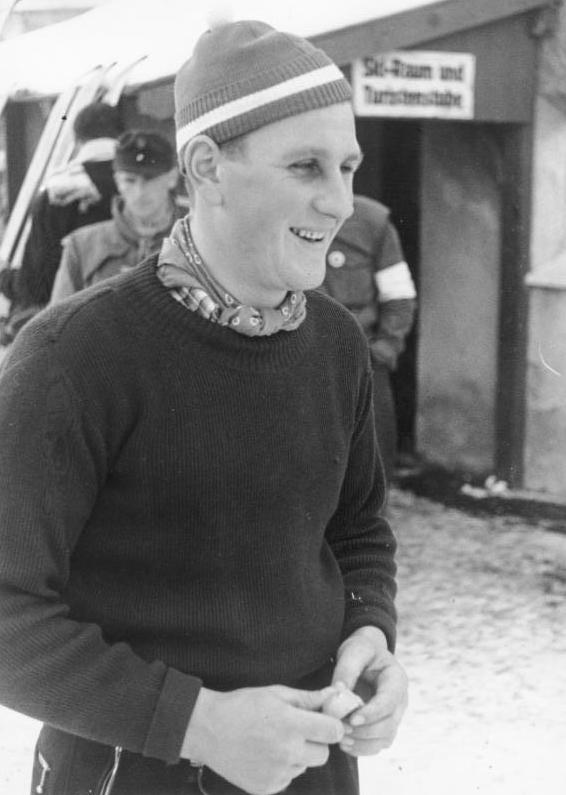
Roman Wörndle at the 1936 Winter Olympics

Roman Wörndle (4 October 1913 – 2 February 1942) was a German alpine skier who competed in the 1936 Winter Olympics.

He was born in Partenkirchen, where he was member of the Skiclub Partenkirchen (SCP). In 1936 he finished fifth in the alpine skiing combined event.

He was killed in action during World War II.
