= Karel Hromádka (ice hockey) =

Czech ice hockey player

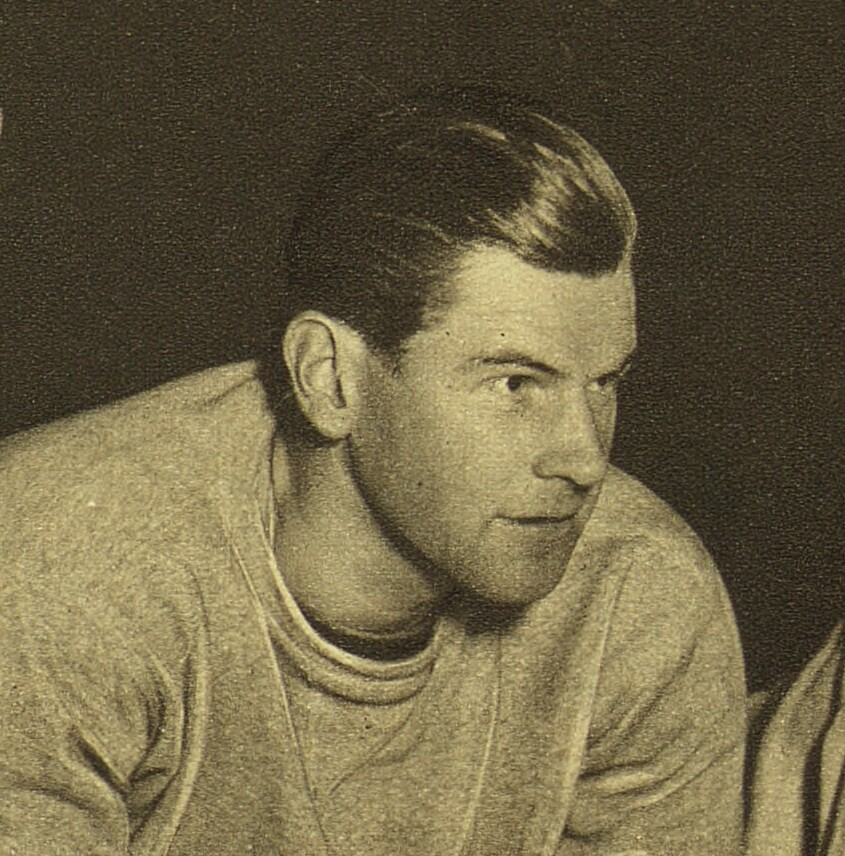

Personal information
- Nationality: Czech
- Born: 23 May 1905; Prague, Austria-Hungary
- Died: 30 March 1978 (aged 72); Tallahassee, Florida, United States

Sport
- Sport: Ice hockey

Karel Frantisek Jiri Hromadka (23 May 1905 – 30 March 1978) was a Czech ice hockey player. He competed in the men's tournaments at the 1928 Winter Olympics and the 1936 Winter Olympics.

His younger brother Eduard was an international alpine skier.
