= Maiocchi =

Maiocchi is an Italian surname. Notable people with the surname include:

- Mario Maiocchi (1913–?), Italian ice hockey player
- Riki Maiocchi (1940–2004), Italian singer
