= Adriano Guarnieri =

Adriano Guarnieri may refer to:

- Adriano Guarnieri (skier)
- Adriano Guarnieri (composer)
- Adriano Guarnieri (ophthalmologist)
