= Maurice Lafforgue =

French alpine skier (1915–1999)

Medal record

Representing France

Men's Alpine skiing

World Championship
| Silver medal – second place | 1937 Chamonix | Downhill |
| Silver medal – second place | 1937 Chamonix | Combined |

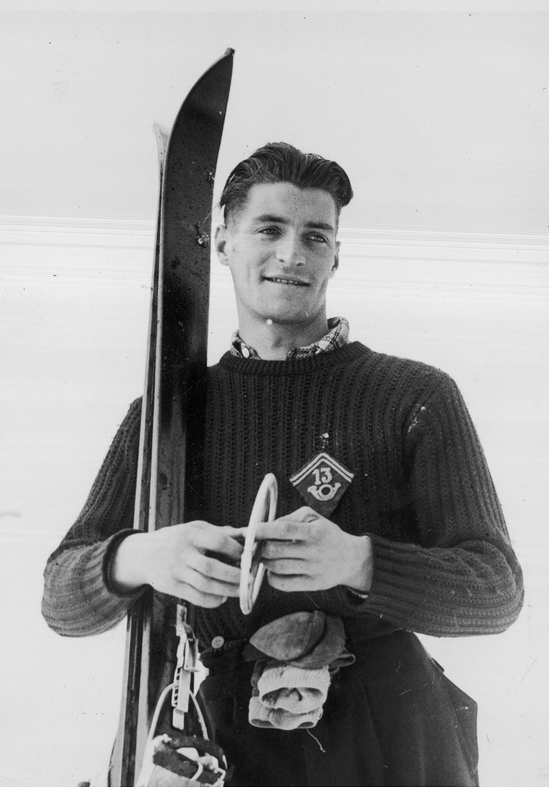
Maurice Lafforgue

Maurice Lafforgue (26 March 1915 – 31 October 1999) was a French alpine skier who competed in the 1936 Winter Olympics. He was born in Bagnères-de-Luchon and was the father of Britt Lafforgue and Ingrid Lafforgue. In 1936, he finished eleventh in the alpine skiing combined event.
