= Bertil Persson (alpine skier) =

Swedish alpine skier (1914–1978)

Personal information
- Nationality: Swedish
- Born: 30 April 1914; Åre, Sweden
- Died: 19 November 1978 (aged 64); Östersund, Sweden

Sport
- Sport: Alpine skiing

Bertil Persson (30 April 1914 – 19 November 1978) was a Swedish alpine skier. He competed in the men's combined event at the 1936 Winter Olympics.
