= Braconnier =

Notable people with the surname Braconnier include:

- Alain Braconnier (born 1942), French psychoanalyst
- Charles-Marie de Braconnier (1849–1917), Belgian soldier who participated in the expeditions led by Henry Morton Stanley
- Jacques Braconnier (1912–1999), a senator of Aisne, France, in 1971–1998
- Jean Braconnier ("Braconnier dit Lourdault", died 1512), a French singer and composer of the Renaissance
- Jean Braconnier (mathematician) (1922–1985), a French mathematician
- Raymond de Braconnier (born 1918), Belgian alpine skier
- Séraphin Braconnier (1812–1884), French naturalist
