= Roland Allard =

French alpine skier (1911–1988)

Personal information
- Full name: Aymard Rolland Allard
- Nationality: French
- Born: 4 June 1911; Mégève, France
- Died: 11 August 1988 (aged 77); Antibes, France

Sport
- Sport: Alpine skiing

Roland Allard (4 June 1911 – 11 August 1988) was a French alpine skier. He competed in the men's combined event at the 1936 Winter Olympics.
