= Hubert Hajm =

Slovenian alpine skier (1914–1971)

Personal information
- Nationality: Slovenian
- Born: 7 August 1914; Jesenice, Austria-Hungary
- Died: 1971 (aged 56–57)

Sport
- Sport: Alpine skiing

Hubert Hajm (7 August 1914 – 1971) was a Slovenian alpine skier. He competed in the men's combined event at the 1936 Winter Olympics, representing Yugoslavia.
