= Manardi =

Manardi is an Italian surname. Notable people with the surname include:

- Raffaele Manardi (1913–?), Italian bobsledder
- Giovanni Manardo or Manardi (1462–1536), Italian physician, botanist, and humanist
