= Askolds Hermanovskis =

Latvian alpine skier (1912–1967)

Personal information
- Full name: Askolds Feliss Hermanovskis
- Nationality: Latvian
- Born: 19 September 1912; Riga, Latvia
- Died: 18 August 1967 (aged 54); New York, New York, United States

Sport
- Sport: Alpine skiing

Askolds Feliss Hermanovskis (19 September 1912 – 18 August 1967) was a Latvian alpine skier. He competed in the men's combined event at the 1936 Winter Olympics.
