= Reşat Erceş =

Turkish alpine skier

Personal information
- Nationality: Turkish
- Born: 5 June 1918

Sport
- Sport: Alpine skiing

Reşat Erceş (born 5 June 1918, date of death unknown) was a Turkish alpine skier. He competed in the men's combined event at the 1936 Winter Olympics. He also participated in the 4 × 10 kilometer relay race, but the Turkish relay team (consisting of Reşat Erceş, Sadri Erkılıç, Mehmut Şevket Karman, Cemal Tigin) did not finish. He was the youngest Turkish athlete at these Games.
