= Greece at the 1936 Winter Olympics =

- IOC code: GRE
- NOC: Committee of the Olympic Games

in Garmisch-Partenkirchen Germany
- Competitors: 1 (man) in 2 sports
- Flag bearer: Dimitrios Negrepontis
- Medals: Gold 0 Silver 0 Bronze 0 Total 0

Winter Olympics appearances (overview)
- 1936; 1948; 1952; 1956; 1960; 1964; 1968; 1972; 1976; 1980; 1984; 1988; 1992; 1994; 1998; 2002; 2006; 2010; 2014; 2018; 2022; 2026

Greece participated at the 1936 Winter Olympics in Garmisch-Partenkirchen, Germany, held between 6 and 16 February 1936. The country's participation in the Games marked its first appearance at the Winter Olympics. The Greek team consisted of a lone athlete skier Dimitrios Negrepontis, who also served as the country's flag-bearer during the opening ceremony. The country did not win any medals in the event.

== Background ==
Greece is the home of the Olympic Games, where the Ancient Olympic Games were held from 8th century BCE to 4th century CE. The first Modern Olympic Games were held in Athens in 1896. Greece had been participating in every Summer Games since the inception. However, the nation did not participate in the first three Winter Olympics since its inception in 1924 in Chamonix. The country's participation in the 1936 Games marked its debut appearance at the Winter Olympics.

The 1936 Winter Olympics were held in Garmisch-Partenkirchen, Germany, held between 6 and 16 February 1936. The Greek delegation consisted of a lone athlete skier Dimitrios Negrepontis, who also served as the country's flag-bearer during the opening ceremony.

== Competitors ==
A lone athlete competed in three events across two sports.

Sport	Men	Women	Athletes
Alpine skiing	1	0	1
Cross-country skiing	1	0	1
Total	1	0	1 (Note: The same athlete competed in both the events)

== Alpine skiing ==
Alpine skiing competitions for men were held between 7 and 9 February at Kreuzeck-Gebiet. Dimitrios Negrepontis was the lone athlete representing the nation, in the Men's combined event. He was ranked 43rd in the downhill event before being disqualified during the second run in the slalom event.

Athlete	Event	Downhill		Slalom			Total	
Athlete	Event	Time	Rank	Time 1	Time 2	Rank	Total points	Rank
Dimitrios Negrepontis	Men's combined	6:58.6	43	2:15.3	DSQ	–	DNF	–

== Cross-country skiing ==
Cross-country skiing competitions for men were held between 12 and 15 February at Olympia-Skistadion. Negrepontis was again the lone competitor representing Greece. While he did not finish the 18 km event, he failed to start in the 50 km event.

Event	Athlete	Race	
Event	Athlete	Time	Rank
Dimitrios Negrepontis	Men's 18 km	DNF	–
Dimitrios Negrepontis	Men's 50 km	DNS	–
