= Per Fossum =

Norwegian alpine skier (1910–2004)

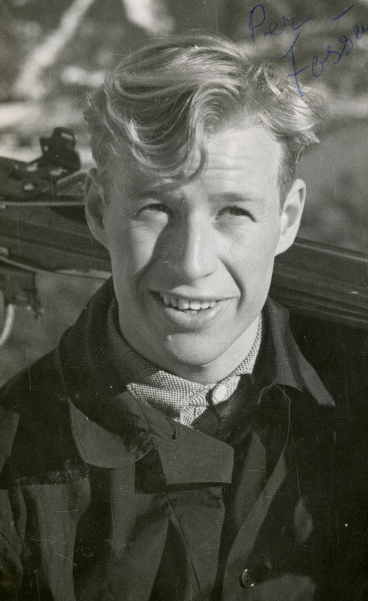

Per Fossum (July 27, 1910 – December 24, 2004) was a Norwegian alpine skier who competed in the 1936 Winter Olympics, when he finished ninth in the alpine skiing combined event.
