= Karol Zając =

Polish skier (1913–1965)

Personal information
- Nationality: Polish
- Born: 19 May 1913; Czarny Dunajec, Poland
- Died: 18 May 1965 (aged 51)

Sport
- Sport: Alpine skiing

Karol Zając (19 May 1913 – 18 May 1965) was a Polish alpine skier. He competed in the men's combined event at the 1936 Winter Olympics.
