= Ülker Pamir =

Turkish skier

Personal information
- Nationality: Turkish
- Born: 7 June 1913

Sport
- Sport: Alpine skiing

Ülker Pamir (born 7 June 1913, date of death unknown) was a Turkish alpine skier. He competed in the men's combined event at the 1936 Winter Olympics. Participated in the Olympic Games in Garmisch-Partenkirchen (1936). He competed in the only event of this competition - the combined. After the downhill he was ranked 58th, out of the classified alpinists he was only ahead of his two compatriots - Karman and Erceş.
