= Herberts Bērtulsons =

Latvian alpine skier (1903–1942)

Personal information
- Nationality: Latvian
- Born: 14 September 1903; Riga, Russian Empire
- Died: February 1942 (aged 38); Soviet Union

Sport
- Sport: Alpine skiing

Herberts Bērtulsons (14 September 1903 – February 1942) was a Latvian alpine skier. He competed in the men's combined event at the 1936 Winter Olympics. He was executed during World War II in a Soviet prison camp.
