= Rudolf Kloeckner =

Romanian alpine skier

Personal information
- Nationality: Romanian
- Born: 10 June 1917

Sport
- Sport: Alpine skiing

Rudolf Kloeckner (born 10 June 1917, date of death unknown) was a Romanian alpine skier. He competed in the men's combined event at the 1936 Winter Olympics.
