= Raymond de Braconier =

Belgian alpine skier

Raymond Jean Gaspar de Braconier
Personal information
- Nationality: Belgian
- Born: 2 February 1908; Liège, Belgium

Sport
- Sport: Alpine skiing

Raymond Jean Gaspar de Braconier (born 2 February 1908) was a Belgian alpine skier. He competed in the men's combined event at the 1936 Winter Olympics.
