= Ioan Coman =

Romanian cross-country skier

Personal information
- Nationality: Romanian
- Born: 14 April 1908
- Died: 1993 (aged 84–85)

Sport
- Sport: Cross-country skiing

Ioan Coman (14 April 1908 – 1993) was a Romanian cross-country skier. He competed in the men's 18 kilometre event at the 1936 Winter Olympics.
