= Dimitrios Negrepontis =

Greek skier (1915–1996)

Personal information
- Nationality: Greek
- Born: 25 March 1915 Lausanne, Switzerland
- Died: June 1996 London, England

Sport
- Sport: Alpine skiing

Dimitrios Negrepontis (Greek: Δημήτριος Νεγρεπόντης; 25 March 1915 – June 1996), also Dimitrios Ioannis Negroponte or Dimitri John Negroponte, was the first-ever Greek to participate in the winter Olympics as an alpine skier. Known today for not saluting Hitler, he later became a successful shipping magnate.

== Early life ==
Negrepontis was born in Lausanne, Switzerland on 25 March 1915 coming from Greek diaspora and the Negropontis family of the island of Chios. He raised in Klosters and Davos, Switzerland.

== Career ==
As a Greek Olympian, he carried the flag into the stadium in 1936. He did not salute Hitler. He competed in the men's combined event at the 1936 Winter Olympics.

== Personal life ==
Negrepontis was married to Catherine Coumantaros (1917–2000), who ran the Friends of Greece shop at 52 East 57th Street. Together, they lived in Manhattan's Upper East Side and were the parents of four sons:

- John Negroponte (b. 1939), a diplomat who was the first-ever Director of National Intelligence and former Deputy Secretary of State of the United States.
- George Negroponte, who served as President of the Drawing Center from 2002 to 2007.
- Michel Negroponte, an Emmy Award winning filmmaker.
- Nicholas Negroponte (b. 1943), an architect who founded the Massachusetts Institute of Technology's Media Lab and of the One Laptop per Child project.

Negrepontis died in London in June 1996.
