= Albert Lincoln Washburn =

American geomorphologist and skier (1911–2007)

- Born: June 15, 1911; New York City, New York, U.S.
- Died: January 30, 2007 (aged 95); Seattle, Washington, U.S.
- Education: Yale University
- Known for: Permafrost studies
- Awards: Vega Medal (1997)
- Scientific career
- Fields: Geomorphology
- Doctoral advisor: Richard Foster Flint

Albert Lincoln "Link" Washburn (June 15, 1911 – January 30, 2007) was an American geomorphologist studying permafrost. Washburn was a proficient skier participating in the 1936 Winter Olympics. Much of his work on permafrost was done in the Canadian arctic.
