= Walter Pick =

Czech alpine skier

Personal information
- Nationality: Czech
- Born: 4 January 1917

Sport
- Sport: Alpine skiing

Walter Pick (born 4 January 1917, date of death unknown) was a Czech alpine skier. He competed in the men's combined event at the 1936 Winter Olympics.
