= Asen Tsankov =

Bulgarian tennis player (1912–1994)

Asen Tsankov (Bulgarian: Асен Цанков, 3 January 1912 – 1994) was a four-time Bulgarian tennis champion and one of the first Bulgarian Olympians, who participated at the Winter Olympics. He represented Bulgaria at the 1936 Winter Olympics held in the German city Garmisch-Partenkirchen. Tsankov participated in the alpine combined, where he was 53rd after the downhill and 45th after the first run of the slalom and did not qualify for the second run. Tsankov was Bulgarian tennis champion in 1939, 1940, 1941 and 1942.

After the Olympics Tsankov began his studies at the Bulgarian State Conservatoire in the chordophone class. He was expelled from the rector (his brother Tsanko Tsankov) for undermining the prestige of the Conservatoire after Asen Tsankov took part at a tennis tournament in Thessaloniki. Afterwards Tsankov started law studies. His right to work as a lawyer was withdrawn and he earned his living by playing music at pubs and celebrations. After the internment of his family in Ruse he was entrusted with the revival of the symphonic orchestra and opera in town. He invited conductors Konstantin Iliev and Dobrin Petkov, as well as young director Leon Daniel. In 1956, he was allowed to live in Sofia again.

Tsankov died in 1994.

== Family ==
Tsankov's son Petar Tsankov is one of the creators of Bulgarian band Shturcite ("Bulgaria's answer to The Beatles").

Tsankov's uncle was Aleksandar Tsankov – Bulgarian Prime minister from 1923 to 1926.
