= Gustav Leubner =

Gustav Leubner (born 5 November 1898, date of death unknown) was a Sudeten German bobsledder who competed for Czechoslovakia in the mid-1930s. He finished 12th in the four-man event and 17th in the two-man event at the 1936 Winter Olympics in Garmisch-Partenkirchen.
