= Borislav Yordanov =

Bulgarian alpine skier (1908–1990)

Borislav Yordanov (Bulgarian: Борислав Йорданов; 7 December 1908 – 1990) was one of the first Bulgarian competitors at the Winter Olympics.

== Biography ==
Yordanov was born on 7 December 1908. He participated at the only discipline in the alpine skiing program – combined (downhill and a two-legged slalom) – at the debut of the sport at the 1936 Winter Olympics in Garmisch-Partenkirchen. He was 30th of 66 participant after the downhill and 42nd after the first leg of the slalom, but he did not finish the race. He is the leading and oldest skier in the Bulgarian alpine skiing team at the Olympics.

After the Olympics, Yordanov was a founding member of the National Sports Academy "Vasil Levski" and was chair of the department for "Theory of body education". He was a member of the Bulgarian Olympic Committee.
