= László Róna =

Hungarian ice hockey player (1913–2007)

- Born: 20 May 1913 Budapest, Austria-Hungary
- Died: 20 May 2007 (aged 94) Marbella, Spain
- Position: Forward
- Played for: Budapesti Korcsolyázó Egylet; EHC Arosa
- National team: Hungary
- Playing career: 1933–1944

László Róna (20 May 1913 — 20 May 2007) was a Hungarian ice hockey player. He played for the Hungarian national team at the 1936 Winter Olympics and several World Championships.
