= Rolando Zanni =

Italian alpine skier (1914–2000)

Personal information
- Born: 8 February 1914 Abetone, Kingdom of Italy
- Died: 5 April 2000 (aged 86)

Skiing career
- Sport: Alpine skiing

Rolando Zanni (8 February 1914 – 5 April 2000) was an Italian alpine skier. He competed in the men's combined event at the 1936 Winter Olympics.
