= Josef Lanzendörfer =

Olympic bobsledder

Medal record

Bobsleigh

World Championships
Silver medal – second place	1935 Igls	Two-man

Josef Lanzendörfer (24 March 1907 – 7 October 1982) was an Austrian bobsledder who competed for Czechoslovakia in the mid-1930s. He won a silver medal in the two-man event at the 1935 FIBT World Championships in Igls. Lanzendörfer also competed at the 1936 Winter Olympics in Garmisch-Partenkirchen, finishing 20th in the two-man event and did not finish the four-man event. He was born in Sankt Marien and died in Berchtesgaden.
