= Kreuzeck (Wetterstein) =

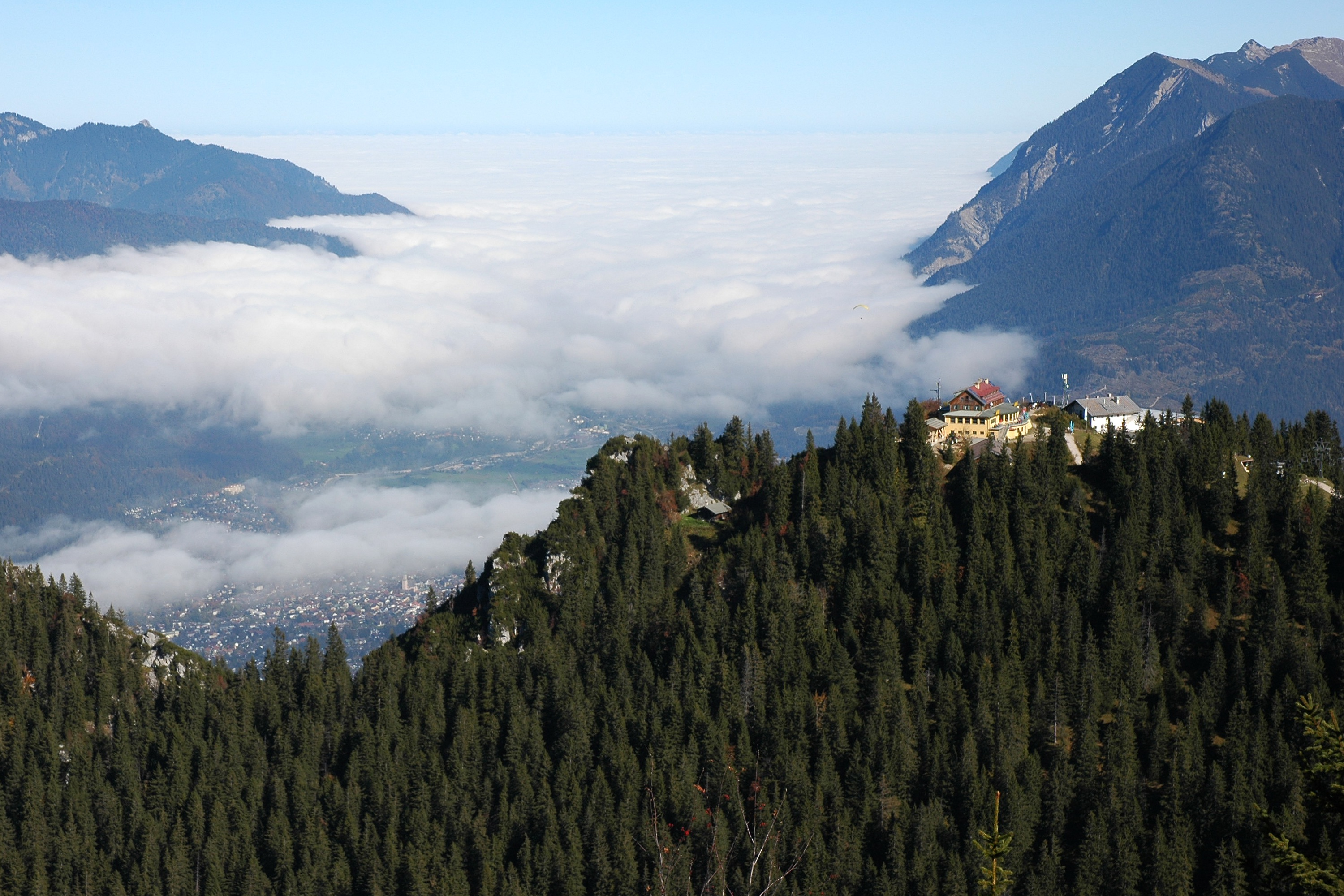
- View of Kreuzeck summit with Kreuzeckhaus

Highest point
- Elevation: 1,651 m (5,417 ft)
- Coordinates: 47°27′12″N 11°04′50″E

Geography
- Location within Bavaria
- Location: Bavaria, Germany
- Parent range: Wetterstein

The Kreuzeck is a mountain in the Wetterstein mountain range of Bavaria, Germany with an elevation of 1,651 m (5,417 ft) above sea level. It is part of the present-day Garmisch Classic ski resort.

The first ski area at Kreuzeck 1,340 m (4,396 ft) was developed for the 1936 Winter Olympics in neighboring Garmisch-Partenkirchen, the first Olympics to feature alpine skiing. The sole event was the combined, with one downhill run and two runs of slalom. The Kreuzeck valley base station served as finish line for the downhill, while the slalom was run at Gudiberg, adjacent to the ski jumping hill, Große Olympiaschanze.

The Kreuzeck featured Germany's first Mountain Gondola (Kreuzeckbahn 1926) which made the Kreuzeck range the alpine portal to the neighboring areas of the Kreuzjoch, the Alpspitze, and the Höllental and provided the infrastructure to host the downhill event for the 1936 Winter Olympics. The original Olympic course is still maintained and accessible. The current downhill course garnered notoriety as a designated "Kandahar" event and continues to host World Cup events in downhill, super G, and giant slalom. It hosted the World Championships in 1978 and 2011.
