= Horst Scheeser =

Romanian alpine skier (1912–1998)

Personal information
- Nationality: Romanian
- Born: 24 June 1912 Brașov, Austria-Hungary
- Died: 10 April 1998 (aged 85) Lindau im Bodensee, Germany

Sport
- Sport: Alpine skiing

Horst Scheeser (24 June 1912 – 10 April 1998) was a Romanian alpine skier. He competed in the men's combined event at the 1936 Winter Olympics.
