= Iosif Covaci =

Romanian alpine skier

Personal information
- Nationality: Romanian
- Born: 2 February 1912 Brașov, Austria-Hungary
- Died: 20 January 1964 (aged 51)

Sport
- Sport: Alpine skiing

Iosif Covaci (2 February 1912 – 20 January 1964) was a Romanian alpine skier in Brasov, Austria-Hungary. He competed in the men's combined event at the 1936 Winter Olympics.
