= Johann Knahl =

Czech alpine skier

Personal information
- Nationality: Czech
- Born: 17 October 1914
- Died: 7 January 1998 (aged 83)

Sport
- Sport: Alpine skiing

Achievements and titles
- Olympic finals: 1936 Winter Olympics

Johann Knahl (17 October 1914 – 7 January 1998) was a Czech alpine skier. He competed in the men's combined event at the 1936 Winter Olympics.
