= Walter Hollmann =

Czech alpine skier (1915–1967)

Personal information
- Nationality: Czech
- Born: 27 December 1915 Špindlerův Mlýn, Austria-Hungary
- Died: 5 September 1967 (aged 51) Horní Maršov, Czechoslovakia

Sport
- Sport: Alpine skiing

Walter Hollmann (27 December 1915 – 5 September 1967) was a Czech alpine skier. He competed in the men's combined event at the 1936 Winter Olympics.
