= Alexandru Budișteanu =

Romanian bobsledder

Alexandru Budişteanu (October 10, 1907 — April 26, 1965) was a Romanian bobsledder who competed in the mid-1930s. At the 1936 Winter Olympics in Garmisch-Partenkirchen, finishing 16th in the two-man event and did not finish in the four-man event.
