= Hubert Negele =

Liechtenstein alpine skier (1919–1994)

Hubert Negele (28 January 1919 – 23 November 1994) was a Liechtensteiner alpine skier who competed in the 1936 Winter Olympics.
