= László Gergely =

Hungarian ice hockey player

- Born: 20 January 1916 Budapest, Austria-Hungary
- Died: 10 March 1946 (aged 30)
- Position: Right wing
- Played for: BKE Budapest; Ferencvárosi TC
- National team: Hungary
- Playing career: 1935–1937

László Gergely or Geiger (20 January 1916 – 10 March 1946) was a Hungarian ice hockey player. He played for the Hungarian national team at the 1936 Winter Olympics and at several World Championships. His brother, András Gergely, was also an ice hockey player, and played with László at the Olympics.
