= Giovanni Kasebacher =

Italian cross-country skier

Giovanni Kasebacher (13 December 1910 – 4 June 1987) was an Italian cross-country skier who competed in the 1936 Winter Olympics.

In 1936 he was a member of the Italian relay team which finished fourth in the 4x10 km relay competition. In the 50 km event he finished 13th.

Further notable results were:

- 1935: 1st, Italian men's championships of cross-country skiing, 46 km
- 1936: 1st, Italian men's championships of cross-country skiing, 36 km
