= Vittorio Chierroni =

Italian alpine skier

Personal information
- Nationality: Italian
- Born: 26 May 1917 Abetone, Tuscany, Italy
- Died: 29 July 1986

Sport
- Country: Italy
- Sport: Alpine Skiing
- Event(s): Slalom, Alpine Combined, Downhill
- Club: Fiamme Gialle
- Retired: 1948

Achievements and titles
- National finals: Italian Championships
- Updated on 25 August 2012

Vittorio Chierroni (26 May 1917 – 29 July 1986) was an Italian alpine skier who competed in the 1936 Winter Olympics and in the 1948 Winter Olympics.

== Biography ==
He was born in Abetone, Tuscany, like Zeno Colò and Celina Seghi, and he finished 18th in the alpine skiing combined event at the 1936 Winter Olympics.

During World War II he participated in the 1941 "World Cup" in Cortina d'Ampezzo that was not subsequently approved by the FIS because many nations opposing the war were absent. At this event, Chierroni won the gold medal in slalom.

== National titles ==
Chierroni won 14 medals (10 wins) at the Italian Championships: 6 in downhill, 5 in slalom and 3 in combined.

- Italian Alpine Ski Championships
  - Downhill: 1936, 1938, 1940, 1943, 1947 (5)
  - Slalom: 1935, 1940 (2)
  - Combined: 1935, 1936, 1940 (3)

Winter Olympics
Preceded by Adriano Guarnieri	Flag bearer for Italy; 1948 St. Moritz	Succeeded by Fides Romanin
