= Franci Čop =

Slovenian alpine skier (1914–2003)

Personal information
- Nationality: Slovenian
- Born: 17 November 1914; Jesenice, Austria-Hungary
- Died: 6 November 2003 (aged 88); Maribor, Slovenia

Sport
- Sport: Alpine skiing

Franci Čop (17 November 1914 – 6 November 2003) was a Slovenian alpine skier. He competed at the 1936 Winter Olympics and the 1948 Winter Olympics, representing Yugoslavia.
