= Lukáš Mihalák =

Slovak cross-country skier (1908–1988)

Lukáš Mihalák (7 October 1908, in Ždiar – 24 November 1988) was a Slovak cross-country skier who competed for Czechoslovakia at the 1936 Winter Olympics. He was born and died in Ždiar.

In 1936 he was a member of the Czechoslovak cross-country relay team which finished fifth in the 4x10 km relay event. In the 18 km competition he finished 10th. He also participated in the 50 km event but did not finish.
