= András Gergely (ice hockey) =

Hungarian ice hockey player (1916–2008)

- Born: 20 January 1916 Budapest, Austria-Hungary
- Died: 19 November 1997 (aged 81) Chile
- Position: Left wing
- Played for: MTK Budapest; BKE Budapest; Ferencvárosi TC
- National team: Hungary
- Playing career: 1932–1940; 1945–1948

András Gergely or Geiger (20 January 1916 – 19 November 1997) was a Hungarian ice hockey player. He played for the Hungarian national team at the 1936 Winter Olympics and at several World Championships. His brother, László Gergely, was also an ice hockey player, and played with András at the Olympics.
