= Eduard Hromádka =

Czech alpine skier (1909–1966)

Personal information
- Nationality: Czech
- Born: 1 March 1909 Prague, Austria-Hungary
- Died: 19 April 1966 (aged 57) Nový Dvůr, Czechoslovakia

Sport
- Sport: Alpine skiing

Eduard Hromádka (1 March 1909 – 19 April 1966) was a Czech alpine skier. He competed in the men's combined event at the 1936 Winter Olympics.

His elder brother Karel was an international ice hockey player.
