= Carlo Solveni =

Italian bobsledder (1897–1983)

Personal information
- Nationality: Italian
- Born: 12 August 1897 Venice, Kingdom of Italy
- Died: 28 June 1983 (aged 85) Como, Italy

Sport
- Sport: Bobsleigh
Medal record
Bobsleigh
World Championships
Bronze medal – third place	1935 Igls	Two-man

Carlo Solveni (12 August 1897 – 28 June 1983) was an Italian bobsledder who competed in the 1930s. He won a bronze medal in the two-man event at the 1935 FIBT World Championships in Igls. At the 1936 Winter Olympics in Garmisch-Partenkirchen, Solveni finished tenth in the four-man event and 12th in the two-man event.
