= Kreuzjoch (Wettersteingebirge) =

Mountain of Bavaria, Germany

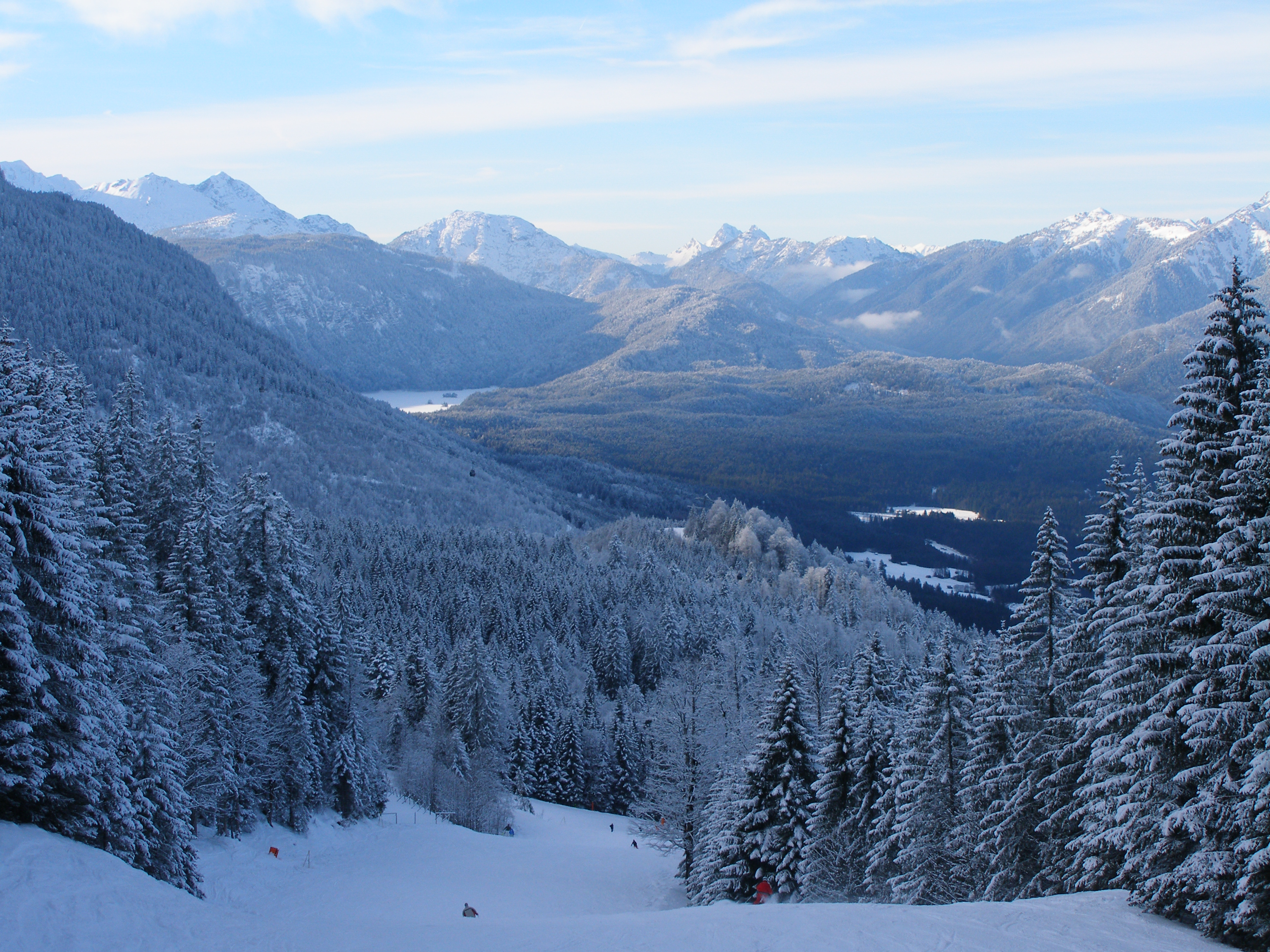
- Kandahar downhill course at Garmisch Classic in 2008, descending from Kreuzjoch

Highest point
- Elevation: 1,719 m (5,640 ft)
- Listing: Mountains of Bavaria
- Coordinates: 47°27′50″N 11°04′30″E

Geography
- Location within Bavaria Location within Germany
- Location: Bavaria, Germany

Kreuzjoch is a mountain of Bavaria in southern Germany, part of the present-day Garmisch Classic ski resort.

== Alpine ski racing ==
For the 1936 Winter Olympics in neighboring Garmisch-Partenkirchen, it was the starting line for the downhill portion of the combined event, the first-ever alpine skiing events in the Winter Olympics. Prior to the launch of the World Cup in 1967, the downhill course was one of the venues of the rotating Arlberg-Kandahar races. In addition to hosting numerous World Cup races, Garmisch Classic was the site of the World Championships in 1978 and 2011.

== Sources ==
- 1936 Winter Olympics official report. pp. 289–303. (in German)
- Garmisch Classic - official site - (in English)
- Ski Map.org - Garmisch-Partenkirchen - 6 maps
- Alpine Ski Maps.com - Garmisch-Partenkirchen
