= Mario Maiocchi =

Italian ice hockey player

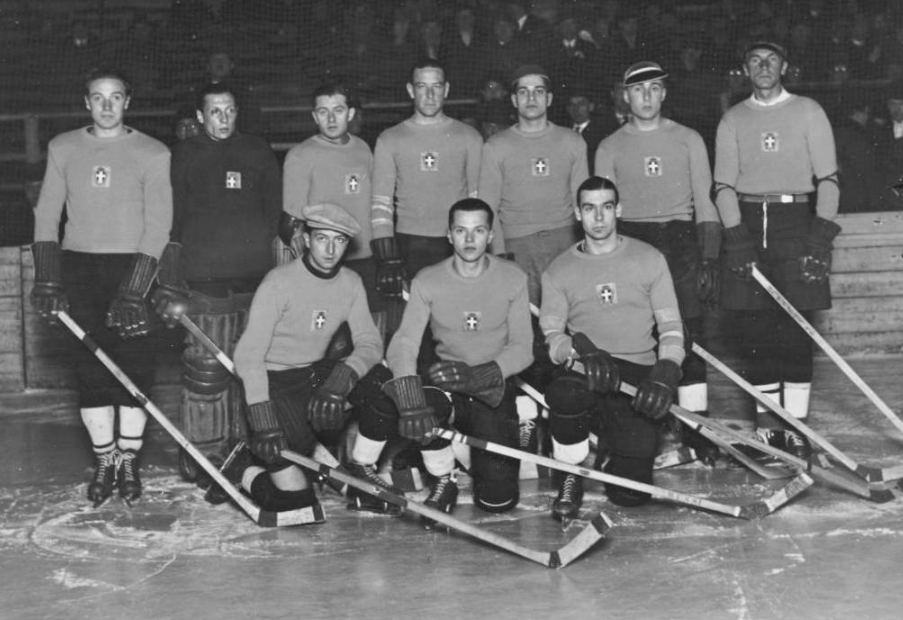

Personal information
- Nationality: Italian
- Born: 27 April 1913; Milan, Italy
- Died: July 18, 1996 (aged 83)

Sport
- Sport: Ice hockey

Mario Maiocchi (b. 27 April 1913 - d. 18 July 1996) was an Italian ice hockey player. He competed in the men's tournament at the 1936 Winter Olympics.
