= Willi Zacharias =

Romanian handball player (1914-2006)

Wilhelm Zacharias
Personal information
- Full name: Wilhelm "Willi" Zacharias
- Nationality: Romania
- Born: 7 March 1914 Sibiu, Austria-Hungary
- Died: 29 April 2006 (aged 92) Graz

Sport
- Sport: Handball

Senior clubs
- Years: Team
- ?-?: Hermannstädter Turnverein
National team
Years	Team	Apps
?-?	Romania	2
- Updated on Caps and goals only during the 1936 Summer Olympics

Wilhelm "Willi" Zacharias (7 March 1914 – 29 April 2006) was a Romanian male handball player, Nordic combined skier, and cross-country skier. He was a member of the Romania men's national handball team. He was a part of the team at the 1936 Summer Olympics, playing two matches. On club level he played for Hermannstädter Turnverein in Romania. He also competed at the 1936 Winter Olympics.
