= Imre Csík =

Hungarian alpine skier (1912–1964)

Imre Csík (6 March 1912 – 29 March 1964) was a Hungarian alpine skier who competed in the 1936 Winter Olympics.
