= Ferenc Monostori =

Hungarian ice hockey player (1909–2008)

- Born: 26 January 1909; Budapest, Austria-Hungary
- Died: 2008 (aged 98–99)
- Position: Goaltender
- National team: Hungary
- Playing career: 1930–1936

Ferenc Monostori (26 January 1909 – 2008) was a Hungarian ice hockey player. He played for the Hungarian national team at the 1936 Winter Olympics.
