= Adriano Guarnieri (skier) =

Italian alpine skier (1914–1983)

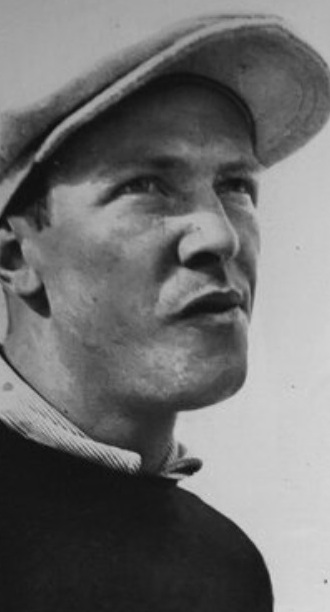

Adriano Guarnieri (18 November 1914 – 5 June 1983) was an Italian alpine skier who competed in the 1936 Winter Olympics. In 1936, he finished 17th in the alpine skiing combined event.

Winter Olympics
| Preceded by Erminio Sertorelli | Flag bearer for Italy; 1936 Garmisch | Succeeded by Vittorio Chierroni |
