= Károly Kővári =

Hungarian alpine skier (1912–1978)

Károly Kővári (21 June 1912 – 20 April 1978) was a Hungarian alpine skier who competed in the 1936 Winter Olympics and in the 1948 Winter Olympics.
