= Raffaele Manardi =

Italian bobsledder (1913–1975)

Personal information
- Nationality: Italian
- Born: 10 May 1913; Amandola, Kingdom of Italy
- Died: 15 January 1975 (aged 61); Rome, Italy

Sport
- Sport: Bobsleigh

Raffaele Manardi (10 May 1913 – 15 January 1975) was an Italian bobsledder who competed in the 1930s. He finished tenth in the four-man event at the 1936 Winter Olympics in Garmisch-Partenkirchen.
