= Levente Balatoni =

Hungarian alpine skier (1910–2000)

Laszlo Levente Balatoni (29 January 1910 – 18 August 2000), alias Levente Ladislas Balatony, was a Hungarian alpine skier who competed in the inaugural alpine skiing event in the 1936 Winter Olympics. He finished 38th among 66 competitors.

He became a naturalised UK citizen in July 1955 and was living there at the time of his death.
