= Attila Monostori =

Hungarian water polo player (1971–2025)

Personal information
- Nationality: Hungarian
- Born: 28 January 1971; Budapest, Hungary
- Died: 8 March 2025 (aged 54)

Sport
- Sport: Water polo

Attila Monostori (28 January 1971 – 8 March 2025) was a Hungarian water polo player who competed in the men's tournament at the 1996 Summer Olympics. He died on 8 March 2025, at the age of 54.
