= Franz Schädler (alpine skier) =

Liechtenstein alpine skier (1917–2004)

Franz Schädler (8 October 1917 – 1 December 2004) was a Liechtensteiner alpine skier who competed in the 1936 Winter Olympics. He was born at Triesenberg, Liechtenstein.
