= László Szalay (skier) =

Hungarian alpine skier (1914–2008)

László Szalay (13 December 1914 – 15 April 2008) was a Hungarian alpine skier who competed in the 1936 Winter Olympics.
