= Franco Rossi (ice hockey) =

Italian ice hockey player and sports manager

- Born: January 2, 1916; Milan, Italy
- Died: February 2, 2006 (aged 90); Alassio, Italy
- Position: Defence
- Shot: Left
- Played for: Hockey Club Milano
- National team: Italy
- Playing career: 1933–1948

Franco Rossi (2 January 1916 – 2 February 2006) was an Italian ice hockey player and sports manager.

== Career ==
Rossi played for Hockey Club Milano from 1937 until 1950, winning six Serie A league championships. He participated in 48 games for the Italy men's national ice hockey team, playing three world championships as well as the Winter Olympic Games of 1936 and 1948. Rossi also played for the Lausanne HC in the National League and became president of HC Bocconi and HC Ambrosiana.
