= Kreuzjoch =

Kreuzjoch (German: cross col) is the name of many summits and several mountain passes, predominantly in the Eastern Alps.

Summits:

- Hohes Kreuzjoch, 2992 m, in the southern Ötztal Alps in South Tyrol
- Kreuzjochkogel, 2746 m, between the Sellrain Valley and the Oberinntal valley in the Stubai Alps
- Kreuzjoch (Samnaungruppe), 2698 m, near Spiss in the Samnaungruppe
- Kreuzjoch (eastern Sarntaler Alpen), 2560 m, near Franzensfeste in the Eisack Valley
- Kreuzjoch (Kitzbühel Alps), 2558 m, is the highest point of the Kitzbühel Alps
- Kreuzjoch (Venet), 2464 m, part of the Venet range in the Ötztal Alps
- Kreuzjoch (Verwall), 2395 m, in the Verwall near Schruns in the Montafon
- Kreuzjoch (western Sarntaler Alpen), 2383 m, near the Hirzer in the Sarntal Alps
- Kreuzjoch (Rastkogelgruppe), 2336 m, above Hippach in the Tuxer Alps
- Mittleres Kreuzjoch, 2321 m, above the Fernpass in the Lechtal Alps
- Kreuzjoch (Rätikon), 2261 m, at the Golmer Joch in the Rätikon
- Kreuzjoch (Montecroce), 2242 m, at the Brenner Pass in the Stubai Alps
- Östliches Kreuzjoch, 2231 m, above the Fernpass in the Lechtal Alps
- Kreuzjoch (Bschlaber Tal), 2185 m, near the Namloser Wetterspitze in the Lechtal Alps
- Kreuzjoch (Wettersteingebirge), 1719 m, above Garmisch-Partenkirchen in the Wettersteingebirge
- Kreuzjoch (Salzachgeier), 2071 m, part of the Salzachgeier in the Kitzbühel Alps

Mountain passes:

- Kreuzjoch (Sellrainer Berge), 2563 m, between the Oberinntal Valley and the Sellrain Valley, Stubaier Alpen
- Kreuzjoch (Pitztal), 2305 m, in the Ötztal Alps on the Kaunergrat range
- Kreuzjoch (Furcela de Furcia), 2293 m, in the Geislergruppe
- Kreuzjoch (Tuxer Kamm), 2178 m, near the Olperer in the Zillertal Alps
- Kreuzjoch (Stubai), 2136 m, in the Schlick 2000 ski area near Fulpmes
- Kreuzjoch (Rettensteingruppe), 1619 m, between Spertental and Windauertal south-east of Kitzbühel
