= Gudiberg =

Ski course in Garmisch-Partenkirchen, Germany

Coordinates: 47.476°N 11.119°E

Gudiberg - Slalom
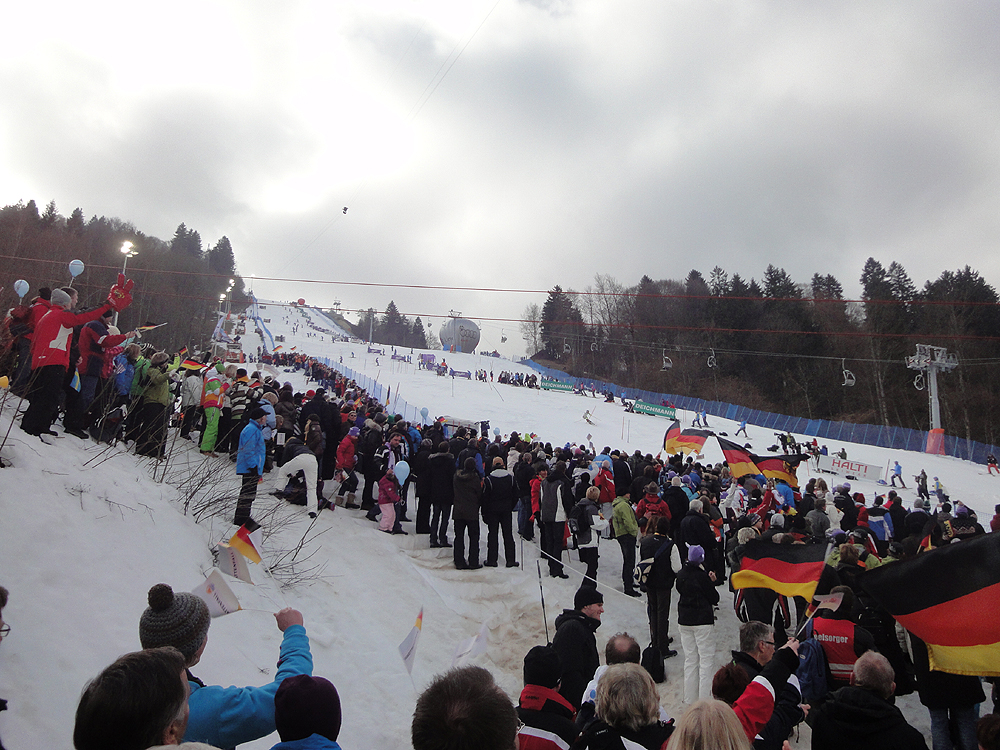
- 2011 World Championships (Women's SL)

- Location within Germany Location within Alps Location within Europe
- Location: Bavaria, Germany
- Nearest city: Garmisch-Partenkirchen
- Vertical: 210 m (689 ft)
- Top elevation: 960 m (3,150 ft)
- Base elevation: 750 m (2,461 ft)

Gudiberg
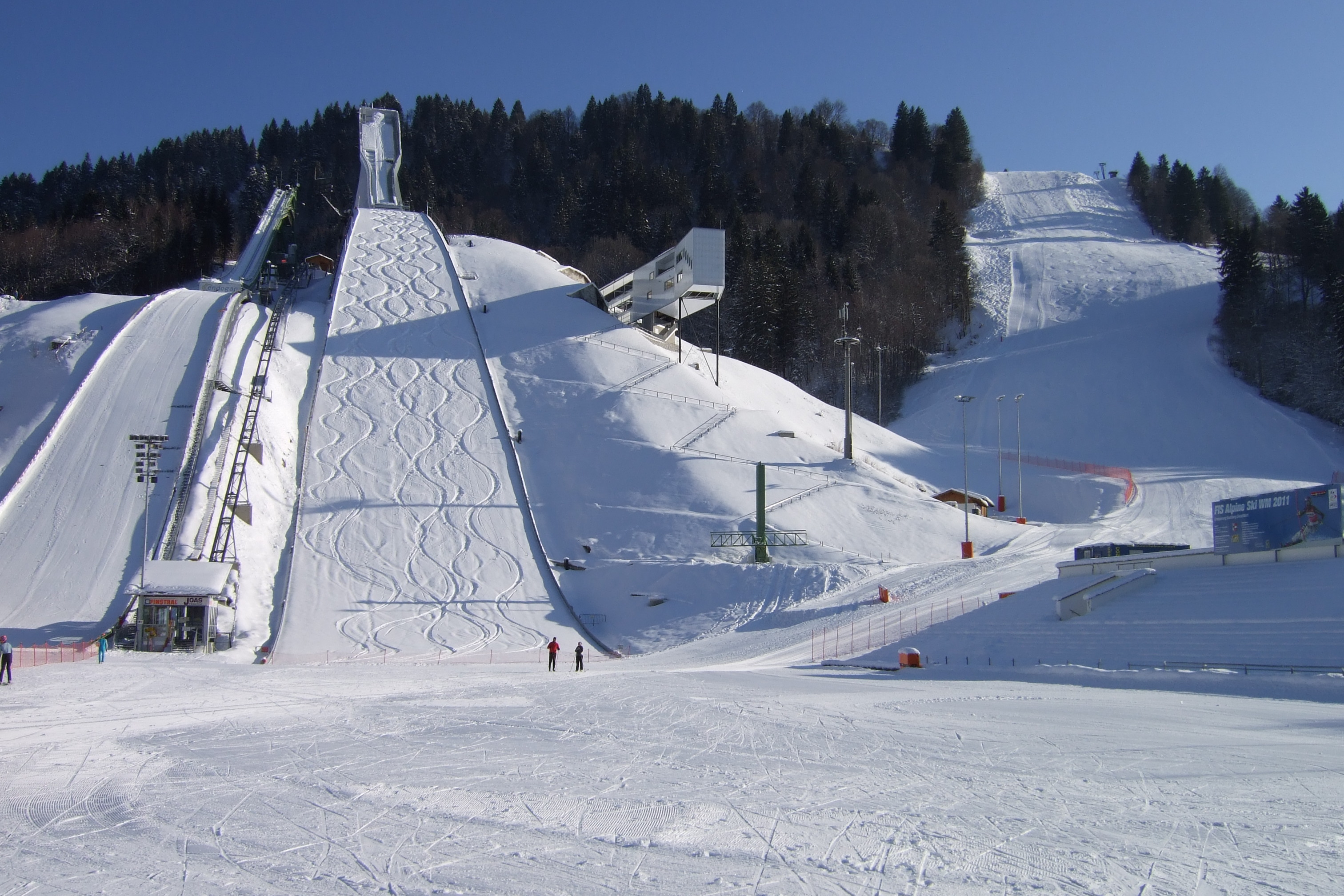
- Große Olympiaschanze & Slalom slope

Highest point
- Elevation: 910 m (2,990 ft)

Geography
- Location: Garmisch-Partenkirchen, Bavaria, Germany

Gudiberg is a World Cup slalom ski course in the mountain with the same name in Garmisch-Partenkirchen, Germany. It lies south of the centre of Partenkirchen and east of the Partnach river.

== Alpine skiing competitions ==
The course hosted the slalom part of the alpine skiing combined event for the 1936 Winter Olympics in neighboring Garmisch-Partenkirchen.

The slalom slope at Gudiberg was improved in preparation for the World Championships in 2011, and has hosted World Cup slalom events.

=== Olympics ===
Year	Winner	Second	Third	
Men
1936	(Nazi Germany) Franz Pfnür	(Nazi Germany) Gustav Lantschner	(France) Émile Allais	KB
Women
1936	(Nazi Germany) Christl Cranz	(Nazi Germany) Käthe Grasegger	(Norway) Laila Schou Nilsen	KB

=== World Championships ===
Year	Winner	Second	Third	
Men
2011	(France) Jean-Baptiste Grange	(Sweden) Jens Byggmark	(Italy) Manfred Mölgg	SL
2011	(Norway) Aksel Lund Svindal	(Italy) Christof Innerhofer	(Italy) Peter Fill	KB
Women
2011	(Austria) Marlies Schild	(Austria) Kathrin Zettel	(Sweden) Maria Pietilä Holmner	SL
2011	(Austria) Anna Fenninger	(Slovenia) Tina Maze	(Sweden) Anja Pärson	KB

=== World Cup ===
Year	Winner	Second	Third	
Men
2023	(Norway) Henrik Kristoffersen	(Austria) Manuel Feller	(France) Clément Noël	SL
2022	(Norway) Henrik Kristoffersen	(United Kingdom) Dave Ryding	(Germany) Linus Straßer	SL
2022	(Norway) Henrik Kristoffersen	(Switzerland) Loïc Meillard	(Austria) Manuel Feller	SL
2010	(Germany) Felix Neureuther	(Austria) Manfred Pranger	(Sweden) André Myhrer	SL
2009	(Italy) Manfred Mölgg	(Italy) Giorgio Rocca	(Austria) Reinfried Herbst	SL
2008	(Austria) Reinfried Herbst	(Italy) Manfred Mölgg	(Croatia) Ivica Kostelić	SL
2007	(Austria) Mario Matt	(Germany) Felix Neureuther	(Austria) Benjamin Raich	SL
1995	(Italy) Alberto Tomba	(Luxembourg) Marc Girardelli	(France) Yves Dimier	SL
1994	(Italy) Alberto Tomba	(Sweden) Thomas Fogdö	(Slovenia) Jure Košir	SL
1993	(Italy) Alberto Tomba	(Norway) Kjetil André Aamodt (Austria) Thomas Stangassinger		SL
1992	(France) Patrice Bianchi	(Austria) Hubert Strolz	(Italy) Alberto Tomba	SL
1992	(Switzerland) Paul Accola	(Norway) Ole Kristian Furuseth	(Austria) Hubert Strolz	KB
1982	(United States) Steve Mahre	(United States) Phil Mahre	(Italy) Paolo De Chiesa	SL
1982	(United States) Steve Mahre	(France) Michel Vion	(Switzerland) Peter Lüscher	KB
1981	(United States) Steve Mahre	(Bulgaria) Petar Popangelov	(Liechtenstein) Paul Frommelt	SL
1979	(Switzerland) Peter Lüscher	(United States) Phil Mahre	(Bulgaria) Petar Popangelov	SL
1979	(Switzerland) Peter Lüscher	(United States) Phil Mahre	(Liechtenstein) Andreas Wenzel	KB
1976	(Italy) Fausto Radici	(Italy) Piero Gros	(Sweden) Ingemar Stenmark	SL
1976	(Switzerland) Walter Tresch	(Italy) Piero Gros	(Italy) Gustav Thöni	KB
1975	(Italy) Piero Gros	(Italy) Gustav Thöni	(Italy) Fausto Radici	SL
1974	(Germany) Christian Neureuther	(Italy) Gustav Thöni	(West Germany) Hansjorg Schlager	SL
Women
2010	(Austria) Marlies Schild	(Austria) Kathrin Zettel	(Germany) Maria Riesch	SL
2009	(United States) Lindsey Vonn	(Germany) Maria Riesch	(Slovenia) Maruša Ferk	SL
2001	(Croatia) Janica Kostelić	(France) Christel Pascal	(Austria) Karin Köllerer	SL
1996	(Slovenia) Urška Hrovat	(Austria) Elfi Eder	(Italy) Roberta Serra	SL
1995	(Germany) Martina Ertl-Renz	(Italy) Deborah Compagnoni	(Switzerland) Gabriela Zingre	SL
1975	(Switzerland) Lise-Marie Morerod	(West Germany) Christa Zechmeister	(Norway) Torill Fjeldstad	SL

== Ski jumping ==
The adjacent ski jumping hill Große Olympiaschanze is a regular stop on the World Cup tour, part of the Four Hills Tournament since 1953.
