= 1936 Winter Olympics =

Multi-sport event in Garmisch-Partenkirchen, Germany

IV Olympic Winter Games
- Logo of the 1936 Winter Olympics (Note: The 1936 Olympic Logo comprises the Olympic rings in the foreground and the summit of the Garmisch-Partenkirchen Alps with a ski track leading to the mountains in the background. Around, there is the inscription "IV. OLYMPISCHE WINTERSPIELE 1936 GARMISCH-PARTENKIRCHEN")
- Location: Garmisch-Partenkirchen, Germany
- Nations: 28
- Athletes: 672 (592 men, 80 women)
- Events: 17 in 4 sports (8 disciplines)
- Opening: 6 February 1936
- Closing: 16 February 1936
- Opened by: Chancellor Adolf Hitler
- Stadium: Große Olympiaschanze

The 1936 Winter Olympics, officially known as the IV Olympic Winter Games (German: IV. Olympische Winterspiele) and commonly known as Garmisch-Partenkirchen 1936, were a winter multi-sport event held from 6 to 16 February 1936 in the market town of Garmisch-Partenkirchen, Germany. Later that year, the country also hosted the 1936 Summer Olympics, which were held in Berlin. It was the last year in which the Summer and Winter Games both took place in the same country (the cancelled 1940 Olympics would have been held in Japan, with Tokyo hosting the Summer Games and Sapporo hosting the Winter Games).

The 1936 Winter Games were organized on behalf of the German League of the Reich for Physical Exercise (DRL) by Karl Ritter von Halt, who had been named president of the committee for the organization of the Fourth Winter Olympics in Garmisch-Partenkirchen by Reichssportführer Hans von Tschammer und Osten.

== Organization and politics ==
While the 1936 Summer Olympics held in Berlin months later have attracted extensive examination for the Nazi Party's spectacles and the accompanying racial controversies, including the exclusion of most Jewish athletes and Jesse Owens's achievements, the Winter Games took place five months earlier and saw some of the same efforts by Adolf Hitler's propaganda machine.

Winter sports were only accepted by the Nazi Party because the Italian dictator Mussolini promoted skiing. The middle class was encouraged to visit ski resorts. In 1936 more than 550,000 winter sports tourists visited Italy. Stylish skiing with Aryan looks was graphic designed by the propaganda artist Ludwig Hohlwein. Globally, there had been efforts to initiate boycotts from different countries, and a number of Jewish athletes faced pressure not to participate in an event held in a nation ruled by a blatantly antisemitic regime.

The Nazis took steps to soften the appearance of their harsher policies before visitors from other nations arrived, such as removing antisemitic signage that was common in Germany, and – under pressure from a potential American boycott and Olympic officials – allowing the Jewish athlete Rudi Ball to play on Germany's ice hockey team. German troops moved back into the demilitarized Rhineland for the Winter Games. A few weeks before the Games began, William L. Shirer, the Berlin correspondent for the Universal wire service, wrote a series of articles describing preparations for the competition. He concluded, "that the Nazis at Garmisch had pulled down all the signs saying that Jews are unwanted (they're all over Germany) and that the Olympic visitors would thus be spared any signs of the kind of treatment meted out to Jews in this country."

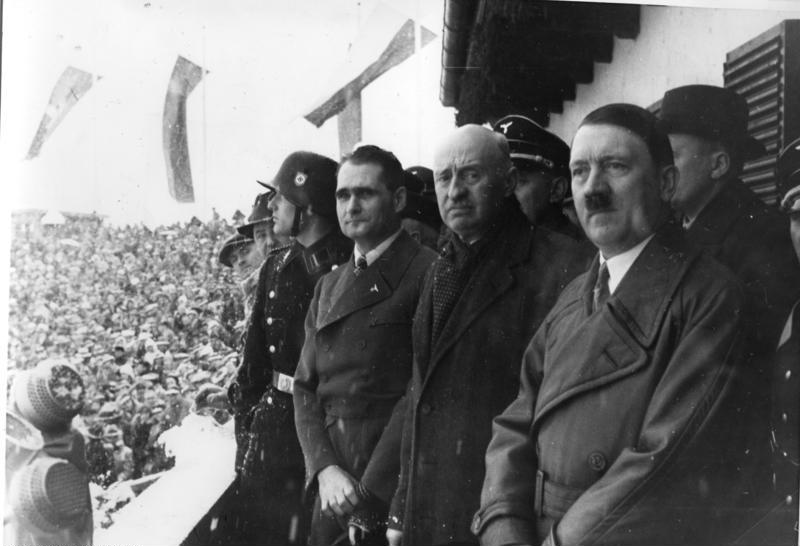
Opening Ceremony with Rudolf Hess, IOC president Henri de Baillet-Latour, and Adolf Hitler

None of the member nations boycotted the Winter Games, and 49 in all participated, the greatest number at that time. The Games were completed with a minimum of political controversy, although the Canadian skiing team raised their arms in what appeared to be a Nazi salute as they entered the opening ceremonies. The German crowd erupted in applause at the salute, which was later explained as the "Olympic Salute" that was identical to the Nazi version but with the arm extended laterally instead of forward.

However, even Shirer was impressed by the effectiveness of the Nazis' efforts, writing:

This has been a more pleasant interlude than I expected. ... On the whole the Nazis have done a wonderful propaganda job. They've greatly impressed most of the visiting foreigners with the lavish but smooth way in which they've run the games and with their kind manners, which to us who came from Berlin of course seemed staged. I was so alarmed at this that I gave a luncheon for some of our businessmen and invited Douglas Miller, our commercial attaché in Berlin, and the best-informed man on Germany we have in our embassy, to enlighten them a little. But they told him what things were like, and Doug scarcely got a word in. ... Back to Berlin tomorrow to the grind of covering Nazi politics."

Twelve days after the Games closed, Hitler sent German troops to remilitarize the Rhineland, his first territorial violation of the Treaty of Versailles and a critical test of European resolve to resist Germany's military expansion.

== Highlights ==
- German skier Willy Bogner took the Olympic oath during the opening ceremonies.
- Alpine skiing made its first appearance in the Winter Olympics as the combined, which added a skier's results in both the downhill and slalom. German athletes Franz Pfnür and Christl Cranz won the men's and women's alpine events, respectively.
- Ivar Ballangrud won three out of the four speed skating races.
- Sonja Henie won her third consecutive gold medal in woman's figure skating.
- Switzerland won the four-man bobsled competition with a time of 5:19.85.
- Great Britain upset 1932 gold medalists Canada in ice hockey when Edgar Brenchley scored the winning goal within the last 90 seconds.
- Norway won the overall games with a total of seven gold medals, five silver medals and three bronze medals.
- The 1936 Winter Olympics presented the largest and heaviest medals ever awarded to athletes: 100 mm (3.9 in) diameter, 4 mm (0.16 in) thick and weighing 324 g (11.4 oz).

== Sports ==
Medals were awarded in 17 events contested in four sports (eight disciplines).

- Bobsleigh (2) ()
- Ice hockey (1) ()
- Skating
  - Figure skating (3) ()
  - Speed skating (4) ()
- Skiing
  - Alpine skiing (2) ()
  - Nordic skiing ()
    - Cross-country skiing (3) ()
    - Nordic combined (1) ()
    - Ski jumping (1) ()

=== Demonstration sports ===
- Military patrol
- Ice stock sport

== Venues ==
- Große Olympiaschanze – Cross-country skiing, Nordic combined, opening and closing ceremonies, and Ski Jumping.
- Gudiberg – Alpine skiing (combined – slalom)
- Kreuzjoch – Alpine skiing (combined – downhill)
- Kreuzeck – Alpine skiing (downhill finish line)
- Olympia-Kunsteisstadion – Figure skating and Ice hockey
- Riessersee and surrounding areas – Bobsleigh, Ice hockey, and Speed skating

== Participating nations ==
A total of 28 nations sent athletes to compete in Germany. Australia, Bulgaria, Greece, Liechtenstein, Spain and Turkey all made their Winter Olympics debut, and Estonia, Latvia, Luxembourg, the Netherlands and Yugoslavia returned after having missed the 1932 Winter Olympics.

Participating National Olympic Committees
- Australia (1)
- Austria (60)
- Belgium (27)
- Bulgaria (7)
- Canada (29)
- Czechoslovakia (48)
- Estonia (5)
- Finland (19)
- France (28)
- Germany (55) (host)
- Great Britain (38)
- Greece (1)
- Hungary (25)
- Italy (40)
- Japan (31)
- Latvia (26)
- Liechtenstein (4)
- Luxembourg (4)
- Netherlands (8)
- Norway (31)
- Poland (20)
- Romania (15)
- Spain (6)
- Sweden (32)
- Switzerland (34)
- Turkey (6)
- United States (55)
- Yugoslavia (17)

=== Number of athletes by National Olympic Committee (from highest to lowest) ===
| IOC Letter Code | Country | Athletes |
|---|---|---|
| AUT | Austria | 60 |
| GER | Germany | 55 |
| USA | United States | 55 |
| TCH | Czechoslovakia | 48 |
| ITA | Italy | 40 |
| GBR | Great Britain | 38 |
| SUI | Switzerland | 34 |
| SWE | Sweden | 32 |
| JPN | Japan | 31 |
| NOR | Norway | 31 |
| CAN | Canada | 29 |
| FRA | France | 28 |
| BEL | Belgium | 27 |
| LAT | Latvia | 26 |
| HUN | Hungary | 25 |
| POL | Poland | 20 |
| FIN | Finland | 19 |
| YUG | Yugoslavia | 17 |
| ROM | Romania | 15 |
| NED | Netherlands | 8 |
| BUL | Bulgaria | 7 |
| ESP | Spain | 6 |
| TUR | Turkey | 6 |
| EST | Estonia | 5 |
| LIE | Liechtenstein | 4 |
| LUX | Luxembourg | 4 |
| AUS | Australia | 1 |
| GRE | Greece | 1 |
| Total | | 646 |

== Medal count ==
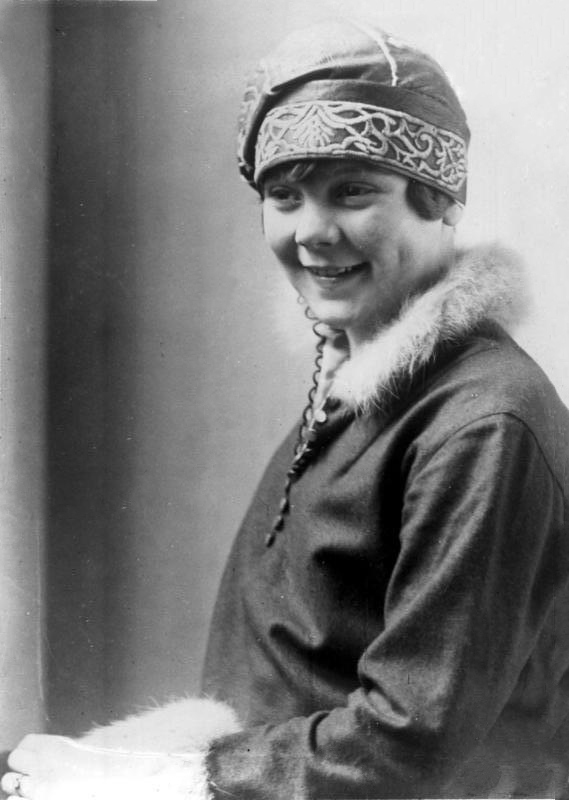
Norwegian figure skater Sonja Henie

* Host nation (Germany)

| Rank | Nation | Gold | Silver | Bronze | Total |
|---|---|---|---|---|---|
| 1 | Norway | 7 | 5 | 3 | 15 |
| 2 | Germany* | 3 | 3 | 0 | 6 |
| 3 | Sweden | 2 | 2 | 3 | 7 |
| 4 | Finland | 1 | 2 | 3 | 6 |
| 5 | Switzerland | 1 | 2 | 0 | 3 |
| 6 | Austria | 1 | 1 | 2 | 4 |
| 7 | Great Britain | 1 | 1 | 1 | 3 |
| 8 | United States | 1 | 0 | 3 | 4 |
| 9 | Canada | 0 | 1 | 0 | 1 |
| 10 | France | 0 | 0 | 1 | 1 |
| 10 | Hungary | 0 | 0 | 1 | 1 |
| Totals (11 entries) | | 17 | 17 | 17 | 51 |

=== Podium sweeps ===
| Date | Sport | Event | NOC | Gold | Silver | Bronze |
|---|---|---|---|---|---|---|
| 13 February | Nordic combined | Individual | Norway | Oddbjørn Hagen | Olaf Hoffsbakken | Sverre Brodahl |
| 15 February | Cross-country skiing | Men's 50 kilometre | Sweden | Elis Wiklund | Axel Wikström | Nils-Joel Englund |

== See also ==
- 1936 Summer Olympics
- Olympic Games held in Germany
  - 1936 Winter Olympics – Garmisch-Partenkirchen
  - 1936 Summer Olympics – Berlin
  - 1972 Summer Olympics – Munich
- List of IOC country codes
- National Socialist League of the Reich for Physical Exercise

Winter Olympics
| Preceded by Lake Placid | IV Olympic Winter Games; Garmisch-Partenkirchen; 1936 | Succeeded by Sapporo/Garmisch-Partenkirchen cancelled due to World War II |
