= Bobsleigh at the 1936 Winter Olympics – Four-man =

The four-man bobsleigh results at the 1936 Winter Olympics in Garmisch-Partenkirchen, Germany. The competition was held on Tuesday and Wednesday, 11 and 12 February 1936.

== Medallists ==
Gold	Silver	Bronze
Switzerland; Switzerland II; Pierre Musy; Arnold Gartmann; Charles Bouvier; Joseph Beerli	Switzerland; Switzerland I Reto Capadrutt; Hans Aichele; Fritz Feierabend; Hans Bütikofer	Great Britain; Great Britain I Frederick McEvoy; James Cardno; Guy Dugdale; Charles Green

== Results ==
Rank	Team	Athletes	Run 1	Run 2	Run 3	Run 4	Final
Gold	Switzerland Switzerland II	Pierre Musy, Arnold Gartmann, Charles Bouvier, & Joseph Beerli	1:22.45	1:18.78	1:19.60	1:19.02	5:19.85
Silver	Switzerland Switzerland I	Reto Capadrutt, Hans Aichele, Fritz Feierabend, & Hans Bütikofer	1:23.49	1:19.88	1:20.75	1:18.61	5:22.73
Bronze	Great Britain Great Britain I	Frederick McEvoy, James Cardno, Guy Dugdale, & Charles Green	1:23.38	1:20.18	1:20.74	1:19.11	5:23.41
4	United States USA I	Hubert Stevens, Crawford Merkel, Robert Martin, & John Shene	1:25.61	1:19.17	1:20.51	1:18.54	5:24.13
5	Belgium Belgium II	Max Houben, Martial Van Schelle, Louis De Ridder, & Paul Graeffe	1:22.22	1:23.52	1:22.50	1:20.68	5:28.92
6	United States USA II	Francis Tyler, James Bickford, Richard Lawrence, & Max Bly	1:25.61	1:23.85	1:20.22	1:19.32	5:29.00
7	Germany Germany I	Hanns Kilian, Sebastian Huber, Fritz Schwarz, & Hermann von Valta	1:20.73	1:23.05	1:24.09	1:21.20	5:29.07
8	Belgium Belgium I	Rene Baron Lunden, Eric Vicomte de Spoelberch, Philippe de Pret Roose, & Gaston Braun	1:25.77	1:21.81	1:21.67	1:20.57	5:29.82
9	France France I	Jean de Suarez d'Aulan, Jacques Bridou, Jean Dauven, & Louis Balsan	1:25.77	1:21.81	1:21.67	1:20.57	5:29.82
10	Italy Italy I	Antonio Brivio, Carlo Solveni, Emilio Dell'Oro, & Raffaele Manardi	1:26.96	1:22.46	1:20.98	1:20.67	5:31.07
11	Austria Austria I	Franz Lorenz, Richard Lorenz, Franz Wohlgemuth, & Rudolf Höll	1:27.38	1:26.84	1:26.17	1:24.74	5:45.13
12	Czechoslovakia Czechoslovakia II	Gustav Leubner, Walter Heinzl, Bedrich Posselt, & Wilhelm Blechschmidt	1:26.68	1:25.60	1:28.13	1:25.11	5:45.52
13	Austria Austria II	Viktor Wigelbeyer, Franz Bednar, Robert Bednar, & Johann Baptist Gudenus	1:30.70	1:29.62	1:30.95	1:26.64	5:57.91
–	Romania Romania II	Alexandru Budişteanu, Tita Rădulescu, Alexandru Ionescu, & Aurel Marasescu	1:31.81	1:28.37	1:25.21	NM; No mark	DNF
–	Italy Italy II	Francesco De Zanna, Ernesto Franceschi, Uberto Gillarduzzi, & Amedeo Angeli	1:23.02	NM			DNF
–	Czechoslovakia Czechoslovakia I	Josef Lanzendörfer, Karel Růžička, Ewald Menzl, & Robert Zintel (bobsledder)	NM				DNF
–	Germany Germany II	Walter Trott, Fritz Vonhof, Wolfgang Kummer, & Rudolf Werlich	NM				DNF
–	France France II	René Charlet, Étienne Payot, Albert Mugnier, & Amédée Ronzel	NM				DNF
–	Romania Romania I	Emil Angelescu, Dumitru Gheorghiu, Teodor Popescu, & Alexandru Tăutu					DNS
