= Austria at the 1936 Winter Olympics =

- IOC code: AUT
- NOC: Austrian Olympic Committee
- Website: www.olympia.at (in German)

in Garmisch-Partenkirchen
- Competitors: 60 (50 men, 10 women) in 8 sports
- Flag bearer: Karl Schäfer
- Medals Ranked 6th: Gold 1 Silver 1 Bronze 2 Total 4

Winter Olympics appearances (overview)
- 1924; 1928; 1932; 1936; 1948; 1952; 1956; 1960; 1964; 1968; 1972; 1976; 1980; 1984; 1988; 1992; 1994; 1998; 2002; 2006; 2010; 2014; 2018; 2022; 2026

Austria competed at the 1936 Winter Olympics in Garmisch-Partenkirchen, Germany.

== Medalists ==
Medal	Name	Sport	Event
Gold	Karl Schäfer	Figure skating	Men's individual
Silver	Ilse Pausin; Erik Pausin	Figure skating	Pairs
Bronze	Felix Kaspar	Figure skating	Men's individual
Bronze	Max Stiepl	Speed skating	Men's 10,000 metres

== Alpine skiing ==
Women

Athlete	Event	Downhill		Slalom			Total	
Athlete	Event	Time	Rank	Time 1	Time 2	Rank	Total points	Rank
Käthe Lettner	Combined	7:02.4	23	1:43.4	1:52.9	16	68.88	20
Grete Weikert	Combined	6:47.0	21	1:41.9 (+0:06)	1:52.9	15	70.47	18
Hertha Rosmini	Combined	6:40.8	20	1:49.2 (+0:06)	1:48.0	17	70.69	17
Grete Nissl	Combined	6:12.8	14	1:38.5	1:38.7	10	76.86	13

== Bobsleigh ==
Sled	Athletes	Event	Run 1		Run 2		Run 3		Run 4		Total	
Sled	Athletes	Event	Time	Rank	Time	Rank	Time	Rank	Time	Rank	Time	Rank
AUT-1	Hans Stürer; Hans Rottensteiner	Two-man	1:28.12	8	1:25.20	11	1:30.55	14	1:28.13	17	5:52.00	13
AUT-2	Hans Volckmar; Anton Kaltenberger	Two-man	1:33.71	20	1:26.28	14	1:30.50	13	1:31.81	20	6:02.30	19

Sled	Athletes	Event	Run 1		Run 2		Run 3		Run 4		Total	
Sled	Athletes	Event	Time	Rank	Time	Rank	Time	Rank	Time	Rank	Time	Rank
AUT-1	Franz Lorenz; Richard Lorenz; Franz Wohlgemuth; Rudolf Höll	Four-man	1:27.38	13	1:26.84	12	1:26.17	12	1:24.74	11	5:45.13	11
AUT-2	Viktor Wigelbeyer; Franz Bednar; Robert Bednar; Johann Baptist Gudenus	Four-man	1:30.70	14	1:29.62	14	1:30.95	14	1:26.64	13	5:57.91	13

== Cross-country skiing ==
Men

Event	Athlete	Race	
Event	Athlete	Time	Rank
18 km	Erich Gallwitz	1'27:28	41
18 km	Alfred Rössner	1'27:05	39
18 km	Hans Jamnig	1'26:20	36
18 km	Harald Bosio	1'24:39	28

Men's 4 x 10 km relay

Athletes	Race	
Athletes	Time	Rank
Alfred Rössner; Harald Bosio; Erich Gallwitz; Hans Baumann	3'02:48	8

== Figure skating ==
Men

Athlete	Event	CF	FS	Places	Points	Final rank
Hellmut May	Men's singles	14	15	96	354.8	14
Leopold Linhart	Men's singles	16	7	80	364.2	11
Felix Kaspar	Men's singles	5	2	24	400.1	3rd place, bronze medalist(s)
Karl Schäfer	Men's singles	1	1	7	422.7	1st place, gold medalist(s)

Women

Athlete	Event	CF	FS	Places	Points	Final rank
Bianca Schenk	Women's singles	16	14	102	356.4	14
Grete Lainer	Women's singles	10	11	65	373.4	9
Emmy Putzinger	Women's singles	9	4	49	381.8	7
Hedy Stenuf	Women's singles	8	3	40	387.6	6

Pairs

Athletes	Points	Score	Final rank
Eleanore Bäumel; Fritz Wächtler	113	8.8	14
Ilse Pausin; Erik Pausin	19.5	11.4	2nd place, silver medalist(s)

== Ice hockey ==
=== Group A ===
Top two teams advanced to semifinals

	Pld	W	L	T	GF	GA	Pts
Canada	3	3	0	0	24	3	6
Austria	3	2	1	0	11	7	4
Poland	3	1	2	0	11	12	2
Latvia	3	0	3	0	3	27	0

7 February	Austria	2-1 (0-0,0-0,2-1)	Poland
8 February	Canada	5-2 (4-0,1-2,0-0)	Austria
9 February	Austria	7-1 (4-0,0-0,3-1)	Latvia

=== Group B ===
Top two teams advanced to Medal Round

	Pld	W	L	T	GF	GA	Pts
United States	3	3	0	0	5	1	6
Czechoslovakia	3	2	1	0	6	4	4
Sweden	3	1	0	2	3	6	2
Austria	3	0	3	0	1	4	0

11 February	Sweden	1-0 (1-0,0-0,0-0)	Austria
12 February	United States	1-0 (0-0,1-0,0-0)	Austria
13 February	Czechoslovakia	2-1 (0-0,2-1,0-0)	Austria

Contestants; Hermann Weiß; Hans Trauttenberg; Rudolf Vojta; Oskar Nowak; Fritz Demmer; Franz Csöngei; Hans Tatzer; Willibald Stanek; Lambert Neumaier; Franz Schüßler; Emil Seidler; Sepp Göbl

== Nordic combined ==
Events:

- 18 km cross-country skiing
- normal hill ski jumping

The cross-country skiing part of this event was combined with the main medal event of cross-country skiing. Those results can be found above in this article in the cross-country skiing section. Some athletes (but not all) entered in both the cross-country skiing and Nordic combined event, their time on the 18 km was used for both events.

The ski jumping (normal hill) event was held separate from the main medal event of ski jumping, results can be found in the table below.

Athlete	Event	Cross-country			Ski Jumping				Total	
Athlete	Event	Time	Points	Rank	Distance 1	Distance 2	Total points	Rank	Points	Rank
Walter Delle Karth	Individual	1'37:14	125.8	46	48.0	49.5	207.4	4	333.2	33
Markus Mayer	Individual	1'27:31	173.7	28	47.0	49.5	188.2	23	361.9	25
Hubert Köstinger	Individual	1'25:09	186.0	15	44.0	48.0	189.2	20	375.2	15
Hans Baumann	Individual	1'22:49	198.5	7	40.0	44.0	173.6	36	372.1	17

== Ski jumping ==
Athlete	Event	Jump 1			Jump 2			Total	
Athlete	Event	Distance	Points	Rank	Distance	Points	Rank	Points	Rank
Franz Aschenwald	Normal hill	64.5	96.7	31	55.5	88.9	38	185.6	36
Sepp Bradl	Normal hill	64.0	98.9	28	70.5	105.1	14	204.0	19
Hans Mariacher	Normal hill	65.5	100.3	26	69.0	101.2	22	201.5	25
Rudolf Rieger	Normal hill	68.0	102.6	16	67.5	97.8	30	200.4	26

== Speed skating ==
Men

Event	Athlete	Race	
Event	Athlete	Time	Rank
500 m	Gustav Slanec	46.7	24
500 m	Ferdinand Preindl	46.4	21
500 m	Karl Wazulek	45.1	13
500 m	Karl Leban	44.8	6
1500 m	Ferdinand Preindl	2:29.0	25
1500 m	Karl Leban	2:24.3	12
1500 m	Karl Wazulek	2:22.2	6
1500 m	Max Stiepl	2:21.6	5
5000 m	Karl Prochaska	9:02.6	24
5000 m	Willy Löwinger	8:53.9	19
5000 m	Karl Wazulek	8:38.4	8
5000 m	Max Stiepl	8:35.0	5
10,000 m	Franz Ortner	19:19.1	27
10,000 m	Willy Löwinger	18:46.5	24
10,000 m	Karl Wazulek	17:57.1	11
10,000 m	Max Stiepl	17:30.0	3rd place, bronze medalist(s)
