= Bobsleigh at the 1936 Winter Olympics – Two-man =

The two-man bobsleigh results at the 1936 Winter Olympics in Garmisch-Partenkirchen. The competition was held on Friday and Saturday, 14 and 15 February 1936.

== Medallists ==
| Gold | Silver | Bronze |
|---|---|---|
| United States; USA I Ivan Brown; Alan Washbond | Switzerland; Switzerland II; Fritz Feierabend; Joseph Beerli | United States; USA II; Gilbert Colgate; Richard Lawrence |

== Results ==
| Rank | Team | Athletes | Run 1 | Run 2 | Run 3 | Run 4 | Final |
|---|---|---|---|---|---|---|---|
| Gold | United States USA I | Ivan Brown & Alan Washbond | 1:22.50 | 1:21.02 | 1:25.39 | 1:20.38 | 5:29.29 |
| Silver | Switzerland Switzerland II | Fritz Feierabend & Joseph Beerli | 1:26.34 | 1:20.31 | 1:24.11 | 1:19.88 | 5:30.64 |
| Bronze | United States USA II | Gilbert Colgate & Richard Lawrence | 1:25.06 | 1:21.94 | 1:24.80 | 1:22.16 | 5:33.96 |
| 4 | Great Britain Great Britain I | Frederick McEvoy & James Cardno | 1:25.61 | 1:23.85 | 1:28.58 | 1:22.21 | 5:40.25 |
| 5 | Germany Germany I | Hanns Kilian & Hermann von Valta | 1:27.29 | 1:24.24 | 1:26.63 | 1:23.85 | 5:42.01 |
| 6 | Germany Germany II | Fritz Grau & Albert Brehme | 1:30.66 | 1:23.33 | 1:26.94 | 1:23.78 | 5:44.71 |
| 7 | Switzerland Switzerland I | Reto Capadrutt & Charles Bouvier | 1:25.45 | 1:23.69 | 1:34.09 | 1:23.00 | 5:46.23 |
| 8 | Belgium Belgium I | Rene Baron Lunden & Eric Vicomte de Spoelberch | 1:25.82 | 1:24.35 | 1:32.31 | 1:23.80 | 5:46.28 |
| 9 | Belgium Belgium II | Max Houben & Martial van Schelle | 1:31.73 | 1:24.05 | 1:26.13 | 1:25.41 | 5:47.32 |
| 10 | Netherlands Holland I | Willem Barongevers & Samuel J. Dunlop | 1:31.41 | 1:24.99 | 1:25.71 | 1:26.00 | 5:48.11 |
| 11 | Italy Italy II | Edgardo Vaghi & Dario Poggi | 1:30.03 | 1:25.66 | 1:29.04 | 1:26.29 | 5:51.02 |
| 12 | Italy Italy I | Antonio Brivio & Carlo Solveni | 1:33.38 | 1:27.85 | 1:25.78 | 1:24.20 | 5:51.21 |
| 13 | Austria Austria I | Hans Stürer & Hans Rottensteiner | 1:28.12 | 1:25.20 | 1:30.55 | 1:28.13 | 5:52.00 |
| 14 | France France I | Jean de Suarez d'Aulan & Jacques Bridou | 1:32.49 | 1:25.59 | 1:28.93 | 1:27.80 | 5:54.81 |
| 15 | Romania Romania I | Alexandru Frimu & Tita Rădulescu | 1:29.96 | 1:27.26 | 1:34.06 | 1:24.73 | 5:56.01 |
| 16 | Romania Romania II | Alexandru Budişteanu & Dumitru Gheorghiu | 1:30.37 | 1:27.58 | 1:34.11 | 1:26.85 | 5:58.91 |
| 17 | Czechoslovakia Czechoslovakia II | Gustav Leubner & Wilhelm Blechschmidt | 1:32.53 | 1:29.23 | 1:31.59 | 1:26.12 | 5:59.47 |
| 18 | Liechtenstein Liechtenstein I | Eduard Theodor von Falz-Fein & Eugen Büchel | 1:30.96 | 1:26.91 | 1:35.27 | 1:28.20 | 6:01.94 |
| 19 | Austria Austria II | Hans Volckmar & Anton Kaltenberger | 1:33.71 | 1:26.28 | 1:30.50 | 1:31.81 | 6:02.30 |
| 20 | Czechoslovakia Czechoslovakia II | Josef Lanzendörfer & Karel Růžička | 1:31.40 | 1:28.90 | 1:36.57 | 1:32.83 | 6:09.70 |
| 21 | France France II | Anatole Bozon & Émile Kleber | 1:41.99 | 1:31.92 | 1:35.09 | 1:31.07 | 6:20.07 |
| 22 | Luxembourg Luxembourg I | Raoul Weckbecker & Géza Wertheim | 1:45.41 | 1:33.95 | 1:35.96 | 1:37.47 | 6:32.79 |
| – | Luxembourg Luxembourg II | Henri Koch & Gustav Wagner | 1:42.02 | 1:31.91 | 1:29.76 | NM | DNF |
