= France at the 1936 Winter Olympics =

- IOC code: FRA
- NOC: French Olympic Committee

in Garmisch-Partenkirchen, Germany 6–18 February 1936
- Competitors: 28 (men) in 4 sports
- Flag bearer: Jacques Faure
- Medals Ranked 10th: Gold 0 Silver 0 Bronze 1 Total 1

Winter Olympics appearances (overview)
- 1924; 1928; 1932; 1936; 1948; 1952; 1956; 1960; 1964; 1968; 1972; 1976; 1980; 1984; 1988; 1992; 1994; 1998; 2002; 2006; 2010; 2014; 2018; 2022; 2026

France competed at the 1936 Winter Olympics in Garmisch-Partenkirchen, Germany.

== Medalists ==
| Medal | Name | Sport | Event |
|---|---|---|---|
| Bronze | Émile Allais | Alpine skiing | Men's combined |

== Alpine skiing ==
Men

| Athlete | Event | Downhill | | Slalom | | | Total | |
| Athlete | Event | Time | Rank | Time 1 | Time 2 | Rank | Total points | Rank |
|---|---|---|---|---|---|---|---|---|
| Roland Allard | Combined | 5:49.4 | 22 | 1:44.8 | 1:34.8 | 26 | 77.86 | 22 |
| Maurice Lafforgue | Combined | 5:29.4 | 14 | 1:26.6 | 1:27.1 | 10 | 85.83 | 11 |
| Émile Allais | Combined | 4:58.8 | 4 | 1:20.4 | 1:16.9 | 3 | 94.69 | 3rd place, bronze medalist(s) |

== Bobsleigh ==
| Sled | Athletes | Event | Run 1 | | Run 2 | | Run 3 | | Run 4 | | Total | |
| Sled | Athletes | Event | Time | Rank | Time | Rank | Time | Rank | Time | Rank | Time | Rank |
|---|---|---|---|---|---|---|---|---|---|---|---|---|
| FRA-1 | Jean de Suarez d'Aulan; Jacques Bridou | Two-man | 1:32.49 | 17 | 1:25.59 | 12 | 1:28.93 | 10 | 1:27.80 | 16 | 5:54.81 | 14 |
| FRA-2 | Anatole Bozon; Émile Kleber | Two-man | 1:41.99 | 21 | 1:31.92 | 22 | 1:35.09 | 20 | 1:31.07 | 19 | 6:20.07 | 21 |

| Sled | Athletes | Event | Run 1 | | Run 2 | | Run 3 | | Run 4 | | Total | |
| Sled | Athletes | Event | Time | Rank | Time | Rank | Time | Rank | Time | Rank | Time | Rank |
|---|---|---|---|---|---|---|---|---|---|---|---|---|
| FRA-1 | Jean de Suarez d'Aulan; Jacques Bridou; Jean Dauven; Louis Balsan | Four-man | 1:22.75 | 4 | 1:22.18 | 6 | 1:23.11 | 9 | 1:22.32 | 10 | 5:30.36 | 9 |
| FRA-2 | René Charlet; Étienne Payot; Albert Mugnier; Amédée Ronzel | Four-man | DNF | – | – | – | – | – | – | – | DNF | – |

== Cross-country skiing ==
Men

| Event | Athlete | Race | |
| Event | Athlete | Time | Rank |
|---|---|---|---|
| 18 km | Alfred Jacomis | 1'27:49 | 43 |
| 18 km | Fernand Mermoud | 1'26:31 | 37 |
| 18 km | Léonce Cretin | 1'26:11 | 35 |
| 18 km | Robert Gindre | 1'23:48 | 24 |

Men's 4 x 10 km relay

| Athletes | Race | |
| Athletes | Time | Rank |
|---|---|---|
| Robert Gindre; Fernand Mermoud; Léonce Crétin; Alfred Jacomis | 3'03:33 | 9 |

== Ice hockey ==
=== Group C ===
Top two teams advanced to semifinals

| | Pld | W | L | T | GF | GA | Pts |
|---|---|---|---|---|---|---|---|
| Czechoslovakia | 3 | 3 | 0 | 0 | 10 | 0 | 6 |
| Hungary | 3 | 2 | 1 | 0 | 14 | 5 | 4 |
| France | 3 | 1 | 2 | 0 | 4 | 7 | 2 |
| Belgium | 3 | 0 | 3 | 0 | 4 | 20 | 0 |

| 7 February | Hungary | 3-0 (0-0,1-0,2-0) | France |
| 8 February | France | 4-2 (1-0,0-1,0-0,1-1,2-0) | Belgium |
| 9 February | Czechoslovakia | 2-0 (0-0,1-0,1-0) | France |

- Team Roster
  - Michel Paccard
  - Jacques Morisson
  - Jacques Lacarrière
  - Pierre Claret
  - Pierre Lorin
  - Marcel Couttet
  - Albert Hassler
  - Guy-Pierre Volpert
  - Jean-Pierre Hagnauer
  - Michel Delesalle
  - Philippe Boyard
