= Bobsleigh at the 1936 Winter Olympics =

Bobsleigh at the IV Olympic Winter Games
- Venue: Garmisch-Partenkirchen, Germany
- Dates: 6-16 February 1936
- Competitors: 95 from 13 nations

At the 1936 Winter Olympics, two bobsleigh events were contested. The competitions were held from February 11, 1936, to February 15, 1936.

== Medal summary ==
Event	Gold	Silver	Bronze
Two-man	United States; USA I Ivan Brown; Alan Washbond	Switzerland; Switzerland II; Fritz Feierabend; Joseph Beerli	United States; USA II; Gilbert Colgate; Richard Lawrence
Four-man	Switzerland; Switzerland II; Pierre Musy; Arnold Gartmann; Charles Bouvier; Joseph Beerli	Switzerland; Switzerland I Reto Capadrutt; Hans Aichele; Fritz Feierabend; Hans Bütikofer	Great Britain; Great Britain I Frederick McEvoy; James Cardno; Guy Dugdale; Charles Green

== Participating nations ==
Liechtenstein, Luxembourg, and the Netherlands only competed in the two-man event. Twenty-three bobsledders competed in both events.

A total of 95 bobsledders from 13 nations competed at the Garmisch-Partenkirchen Games:

- Austria (12)
- Belgium (8)
- Czechoslovakia (8)
- France (10)
- Germany (10)
- Great Britain (4)
- Italy (10)
- Liechtenstein (2)
- Luxembourg (4)
- Netherlands (2)
- Romania (9)
- Switzerland (9)
- United States (11)

== Medal table ==
Rank	Nation	Gold	Silver	Bronze	Total
1	Switzerland	1	2	0	3
2	United States	1	0	1	2
3	Great Britain	0	0	1	1
Totals (3 entries)		2	2	2	6
