= Switzerland at the 1936 Winter Olympics =

- IOC code: SUI
- NOC: Swiss Olympic Association
- Website: www.swissolympic.ch (in German and French)

in Garmisch-Partenkirchen
- Competitors: 34 (30 men, 4 women) in 7 sports
- Medals Ranked 5th: Gold 1 Silver 2 Bronze 0 Total 3

Winter Olympics appearances (overview)
- 1924; 1928; 1932; 1936; 1948; 1952; 1956; 1960; 1964; 1968; 1972; 1976; 1980; 1984; 1988; 1992; 1994; 1998; 2002; 2006; 2010; 2014; 2018; 2022; 2026

Switzerland competed at the 1936 Winter Olympics in Garmisch-Partenkirchen, Germany.

== Medalists ==
Medal	Name	Sport	Event
Gold	Pierre Musy; Arnold Gartmann; Charles Bouvier; Joseph Beerli	Bobsleigh	Four-man
Silver	Fritz Feierabend; Joseph Beerli	Bobsleigh	Two-man
Silver	Reto Capadrutt; Hans Aichele; Fritz Feierabend; Hans Bütikofer	Bobsleigh	Four-man

== Alpine skiing ==
Women

Athlete	Event	Downhill		Slalom			Total	
Athlete	Event	Time	Rank	Time 1	Time 2	Rank	Total points	Rank
Marcelle Bühler	Combined	5:51.6	9	1:45.1 (+0:06)	1:34.6	12	78.87	10
Erna Steuri	Combined	5:20.4	4	1:17.2	1:21.2	3	92.36	4

== Bobsleigh ==
Sled	Athletes	Event	Run 1		Run 2		Run 3		Run 4		Total	
Sled	Athletes	Event	Time	Rank	Time	Rank	Time	Rank	Time	Rank	Time	Rank
SUI-1	Reto Capadrutt; Charles Bouvier	Two-man	1:25.45	3	1:23.69	5	1:34.09	18	1:23.00	5	5:46.23	7
SUI-2	Fritz Feierabend; Joseph Beerli	Two-man	1:26.34	6	1:20.31	1	1:24.11	1	1:19.88	1	5:30.64	2nd place, silver medalist(s)

Sled	Athletes	Event	Run 1		Run 2		Run 3		Run 4		Total	
Sled	Athletes	Event	Time	Rank	Time	Rank	Time	Rank	Time	Rank	Time	Rank
SUI-1	Reto Capadrutt; Hans Aichele; Fritz Feierabend; Hans Bütikofer	Four-man	1:23.49	7	1:19.88	3	1:20.75	5	1:18.61	1	5:22.73	2nd place, silver medalist(s)
SUI-2	Pierre Musy; Arnold Gartmann; Charles Bouvier; Joseph Beerli	Four-man	1:22.45	3	1:18.78	1	1:19.60	1	1:19.02	3	5:19.85	1st place, gold medalist(s)

== Cross-country skiing ==
Men

Event	Athlete	Race	
Event	Athlete	Time	Rank
18 km	Eduard Müller	1'32:04	51
18 km	Adolf Freiburghaus	1'27:08	40
18 km	Willi Bernath	1'25:12	31
18 km	August Sonderegger	1'24:27	26

== Figure skating ==
Men

Athlete	Event	CF	FS	Places	Points	Final rank
Lucian Büeler	Men's singles	15	21	119	343.6	17

Women

Athlete	Event	CF	FS	Places	Points	Final rank
Angela Anderes	Women's singles	15	16	101	355.4	13

== Ice hockey ==
=== Group B ===
Top two teams advanced to semifinals

	Pld	W	L	T	GF	GA	Pts
Germany	3	2	1	0	5	1	4
United States	3	2	1	0	5	2	4
Italy	3	1	2	0	2	5	2
Switzerland	3	1	2	0	1	5	2

7 February	United States	3-0 (0-0,3-0,0-0)	Switzerland
8 February	Germany	2-0 (0-0,1-0,1-0)	Switzerland
9 February	Switzerland	1-0 (0-0,1-0,0-0)	Italy

Contestants; Albert Künzler; Arnold Hirtz; Oskar Schmidt; Ernst Hug; Adolf Martignoni; Hans Cattini; Bibi Torriani; Ferdinand Cattini; Urs Wietlisbach; Otto Heller; Charles Kessler; Thomas Pleisch

== Nordic combined ==
Events:

- 18 km cross-country skiing
- normal hill ski jumping

The cross-country skiing part of this event was combined with the main medal event of cross-country skiing. Those results can be found above in this article in the cross-country skiing section. Some athletes (but not all) entered in both the cross-country skiing and Nordic combined event, their time on the 18 km was used for both events.

The ski jumping (normal hill) event was held separate from the main medal event of ski jumping, results can be found in the table below.

Athlete	Event	Cross-country			Ski Jumping				Total	
Athlete	Event	Time	Points	Rank	Distance 1	Distance 2	Total points	Rank	Points	Rank
Ernst Berger	Individual	1'27:13	175.2	27	36.5	47.5	174.9	34	350.1	30
Oswald Julen	Individual	1'25:43	183.0	21	43.0	45.0	184.3	24	367.3	21
Willi Bernath	Individual	1'25:12	185.7	17	43.5	47.0	180.7	30	366.4	22

== Ski jumping ==
Athlete	Event	Jump 1			Jump 2			Total	
Athlete	Event	Distance	Points	Rank	Distance	Points	Rank	Points	Rank
Reto Badrutt	Normal hill	64.5	95.7	34	65.0	95.5	33	191.2	34
Marcel Raymond	Normal hill	64.0	96.4	32	68.5	100.9	24	197.3	28
Richard Bühler	Normal hill	63.0	102.0	18	63.0	102.0	20	204.0	19
