= Corps Bavaria Munich =

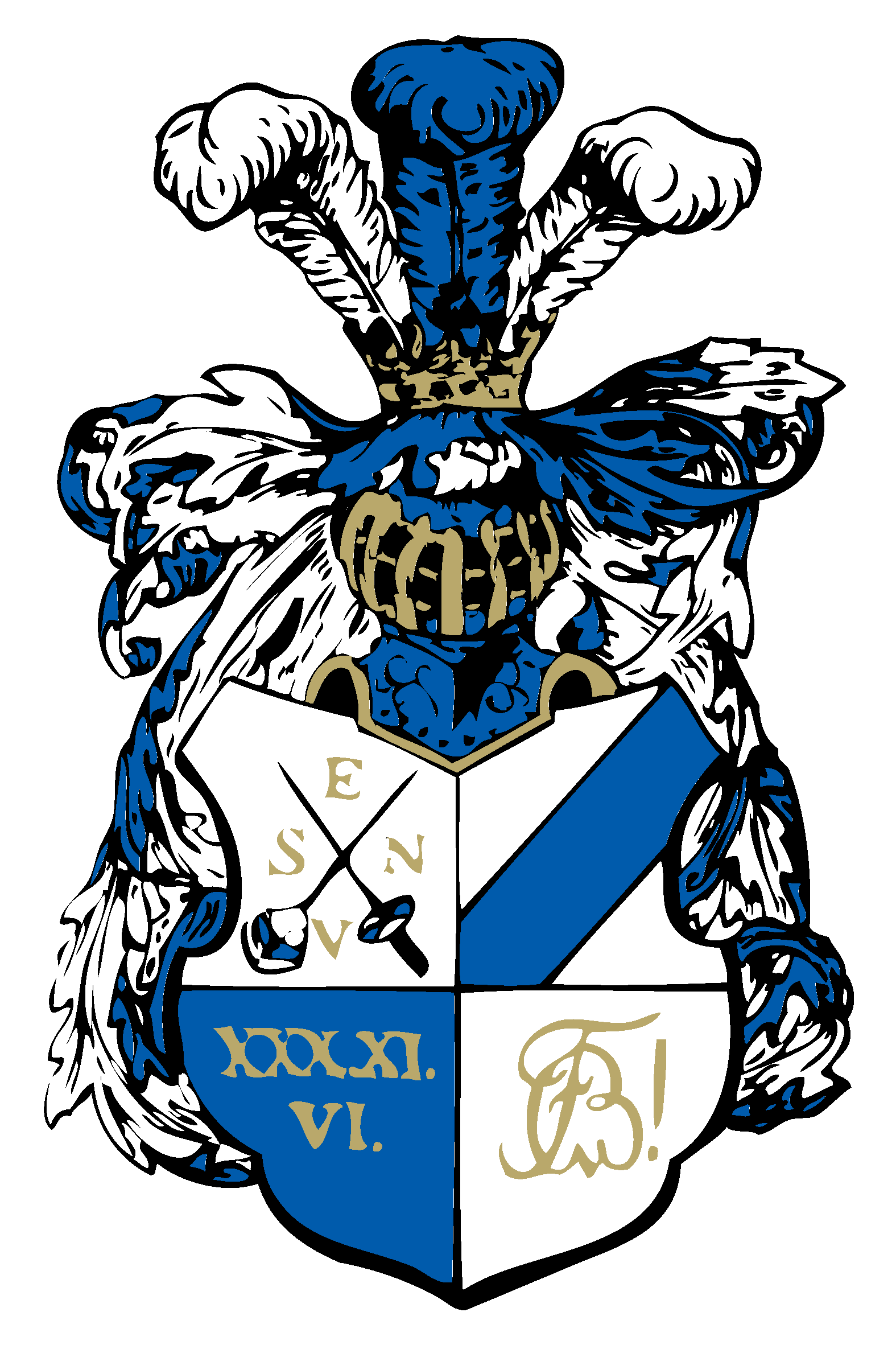
Coat of Arms of the Corps Bavaria of Munich

The Corps Bavaria of Munich is a German Student Corps located in the City of Munich. The Fraternity is a founding member of the umbrella organisation "Kösener Senioren Convent" and unites current students of all Universities in Munich and Alumnus. As a German Corps it still practices the Mensur, the Members are wearing an academic ribbon as a sign of belonging. The fellows of the Corps are called "Bavarians from Munich", because in the early years only people from Bavaria were able to affiliate.

== Couleur ==
Bavaria is known for their white-blue-white ribbon on golden ground. On special occasions the Bavarians also wear a white student Cap. New members (Füchse) have a ribbon with the colours white-blue on golden ground.

== History ==
=== Landshut ===
The Corps was founded on 30 November 1806 at the Ludwig-Maximilians-Universität in Landshut, which today is LMU Munich (Ludwig-Maximilians-Universität München). The founding president was Joseph Count of Armansperg. He later became Bavarian Minister for inner-, outer-, and financial affairs. As a minister for inner affairs, he guaranteed the moving of the Corps from Landshut to Munich in 1827. In 1832, Armansperg became Archchancellor of the Kingdom of Greece.

Another founding member was Carl Joseph Anton Mittermaier, one of the best known Law Professors in the 19th Century. He was president of Heidelberg University and the Ludwig-Maximilians-Universität in Landshut and later became President of the first democratic Parliament in Germany in 1848.

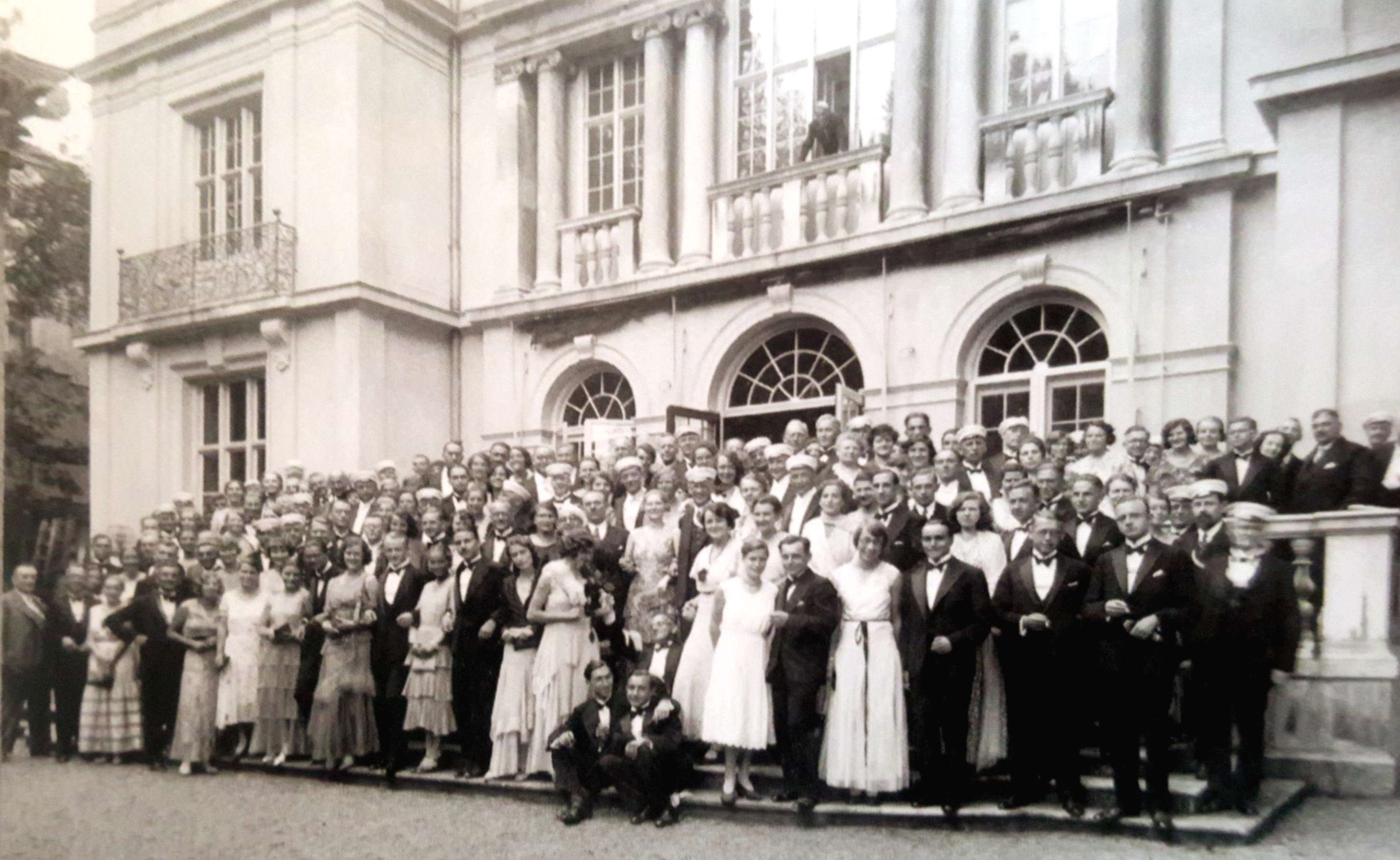
Members of the Corps Bavaria in front of their Kaulbachvilla. The occasion is the 128th anniversary in 1934.

=== Munich ===
In July 1848 the President of the Corps Anton Baron of Lobkowitz was a co-founder of the Umbrella Organisation, KSCV. Corps Bavaria became a full member in 1862 and still is today.

During the 19th Century many Noblemen, Jurists and Medics were fellows of the Corps. As the Bavarian Corps in Munich many members served the royal family of Bavaria, the Wittelsbachers. Only two examples are Emil Knight of Schauß (he protected the royal treasure) and Theodor Imperal Earl Basselet of la Rosée (Educator of the Royal Princes Ludwig and Otto).

In the time of National Socialism Corps Bavaria was forbidden as one of the first Corps, because they refused to work together with the National Socialistic Party. In 1935, they got forced to sell their own house, next to the Ludwig-Maximilians-Universität München, to the politician Adolf Wagner. One Alumnus, namely Eduard Brücklmaier, was executed due to his connections to the plot of 20 July 1944.

After the Second World War the Corps was refounded on 13 July 1947, in 1963 the Alumnus bought a new house for the students in the district of Bogenhausen, this house was renovated and extended multiple times, in honour of the 200th Anniversary a Commercium in the Hofbräukeller and a ball in the Hotel "Bayrischer Hof".

Today the Corps has over 230 members, of which approximately 20 study. Every student has to live at least 3 to 4 semesters in the house of the fraternity before being dismissed as an Alumnus.

One particularity is, that most German fraternities – like Bavaria Munich – postulate live long membership. Those who finish their studies and even live in another city or country, still visit their "brothers“ periodically for special events or just pay a visit to the house spontaneously.

== Notable members ==
Some famous members of the Corps Bavaria Munich can be found here.

Short excerpt (alphabetically):

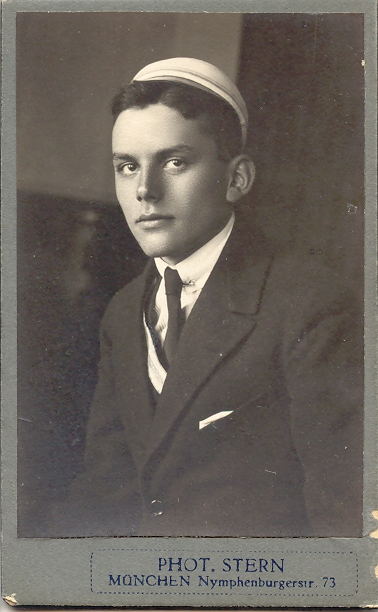
Eduard Brücklmeier as a Member

- Joseph Earl of Armansperg (1787–1853), Founder, Bavarian Minister, Chancellor of Greece
- Josef Knight of Aschenbrenner (1798–1858), Minister of Finance of Bavaria
- Gustav Baermann (1877–1950), Medic (Larvenauswanderungsverfahren)
- Theodor Imperial Earl Basselet of la Rosée (1801–1864), General, Royal Educator
- Eduard Brücklmeier (1903–1944), Lawyer, killed by Nazi Gouvernment
- Stefan Blum (*1957), Lawyer, Entrepreneur
- Richard Anton Nikolaus Carron du Val (1793–1846), Lawyer, Mayor of Augsburg
- Georg Cornet (1858–1915), Medic
- Ernst Derra (1901–1979), Medic
- Bodo Eidenmüller (1927-2024), Chief of Production with Siemens
- Horst Eidenmüller (*1963), Lecturer in Oxford
- Karsten Ewert (*1937), Medic, General of the Bundeswehr
- Ambroise Forssman-Trevedy (*1963), CEO of Wasgau Inc.
- Ignaz Baron Freyschlag of Freyenstein (1827–1891), General
- Ernst Frickhinger (1876–1940), Medic
- Joseph Gangkofner (1804–1862), Member of the parliament
- Heinrich Gattineau (1905–1985), Director at I.G. Farben, board member of WASAG-Chemie AG
- Karl Gebhardt (1897–1948), Medic, General of the SS
- Ludwig Grass (1789-1860), physician and political figure from Liechtenstein.
- Eugen Baron of Gorup-Besánez (1817–1878), Chemist
- Max Haushofer (1811-1866), painter, Professor, grandfather of Karl Haushofer
- Franz Hayler (1900-1972), Secretary of State
- Gerd Hohlbach (*1944), Medic, Professor
- Lutz Jani (1935–2019), Medic, Professor
- Friedrich Jungheinrich (1899–1968), Founder of Jungheinrich
- Kajetan Georg von Kaiser (1803-1871), chemistry professor, researcher and inventor
- Ernst Mantel (1897–1971), Judge
- Karl Mantel (1869–1929), Chief of Police in Munich
- Theodor Mantel (*1942), Medic, Professor
- Ernst-Günther Mohr (1904-1991), Ambassador
- Carl Joseph Anton Mittermaier (1787–1867), President of the Universities of Landshut and Heidelberg
- Ernst-Günther Mohr (1904–1991), Ambassador
- Ignaz Perner (1796–1867), Lawyer
- Johann Michael Knight of Poschinger (1794–1863), Member of Parliament
- Anton Knight of Schauß (1800–1876), Lawyer, Member of Parliament
- Emil Knight of Schauß (1833–1900), Treasurer of the Royal Family
- Hermann von Valta (1900-1968), Olympic Gold medal winner
- Karl Tempel (1904–1940), 2nd Mayor of Munich
- Anton Westermayer (1816–1894), Member of the Parliament, Priest
