= Diener (disambiguation) =

Diener is a morgue worker responsible for handling, moving, and cleaning the corpse.

Diener may also refer to:

== People with the surname ==
- Bertha Eckstein-Diener (1874–1948), née Diener, Austrian writer also known by her pseudonym Helen Diener
- Carl Diener (1862–1928), Austrian geographer, geologist and palaeontologist
- Christian Diener (born 1993), German backstroke swimmer
- Drake Diener (born 1981), American professional basketball player
- Ed Diener (1946–2021), American psychologist, professor and author
- Emil Diener, Swiss bobsleigher
- Gottfried Diener (1926–2015), Swiss bobsleigher
- James Diener, American music executive and entrepreneur
- Joan Diener (1930–2006), American theatre actress and singer
- John V. Diener (1887–1937), American politician
- Melanie Diener (born 1967), German operatic and concert soprano
- Theodor Otto Diener (1921–2023), American plant pathologist
- Travis Diener (born 1982), American professional basketball player
- Verena Diener (1949–2024), Swiss politician

== Other uses ==
- Diener & Diener, an architectural firm established in Basel, Switzerland

== See also ==
- Marie Diener-West, American biostatistician and epidemiologist
- Robert Biswas-Diener (born 1972), American psychologist and author
- Deiner Córdoba (born 1992), Colombian footballer
