= Francesco De Zanna =

Italian bobsledder (1905–1989)

Personal information
- Nationality: Italian
- Born: 18 January 1905; Cortina d'Ampezzo, Austria-Hungary
- Died: 9 April 1989 (aged 84); Cortina d'Ampezzo, Italy

Sport
- Sport: Bobsleigh, Ice hockey

Francesco De Zanna (18 January 1905 – 9 April 1989) was an Italian bobsledder and ice hockey player who competed from the 1920s to the mid 1950s. He competed in the four-man event at the 1936 Winter Olympics in Garmisch-Partenkirchen, but did not finish. He retired from competition after the 1955 World Championships in St. Moritz where he finished fourth in the two-man event.

He was also active as an ice hockey player and was part of the SG Cortina team which won the 1931-32 Italian ice hockey championship.
