= Henri Koch =

Henri Koch is the name of:

- Henri Koch (bobsledder) (born 1904), Olympic bobsledder from Luxembourg
- Henri Koch (academic) (1911–1997), Belgian professor
