= Bozon =

Bozon may refer to:

- The word for boson, a type of elementary particle, in Breton, Japanese, Polish, Serbo-Croatian, Slovene, or Turkish
- Bozon Records, Polish record label
- Bozon (surname)
- Bozön, neighborhood in Mezitli, Mersin Province, Turkey

== See also ==
- Boson (disambiguation)
