= Gribincea =

Gribincea is a surname. Notable people with the surname include:

- Ion Gribincea (fl. 1930s), Romanian bobsledder
- Vladislav Gribincea (born 1980), Moldovan lawyer
