= Vaghi =

Vaghi may refer to:

- Edgardo Vaghi, Italian bobsledder.
- Peter Vaghi, American Roman Catholic priest.
- Giacomo Vaghi, Italian opera singer.
- Ricardo Vaghi, an Argentine footballer who played for River Plate in the 1940s.
- Vagindra script, a Mongolian alphabet.
