= Rottensteiner =

Rottensteiner is a surname of German origin. Notable people with this surname include:

- Franz Rottensteiner (born 1942), Austrian publisher
- Hans Rottensteiner (1901–1957), Austrian bobsledder
- Helmut Rottensteiner (born 1977), Austrian footballer
- Thomas Rottensteiner (born 1963), Italian bobsledder
