= Rosemarie Stewart =

British figure skater

Personal information
- Full name: Rosemarie Stewart Dench
- Born: 22 June 1914 Woodbridge, Suffolk
- Died: September 2001 (aged 87)

Figure skating career
- Country: United Kingdom

Rosemarie Stewart (married name: Dench; 22 June 1914 – September 2001) was an English pair skater. She competed in the 1936 Winter Olympics in Garmisch-Partenkirchen in the pairs event with partner Ernest Yates. They placed 10th out of a field of 18 teams. She was born in Woodbridge, Suffolk. After the Olympics she married Robert Dench and, together, they toured with the Ice Capades through the 1940s and the 1950s. Robert became an American citizen in 1944. She and her husband published a book to introduce people to pair skating in 1943.
