= Ivan Brown =

Ivan Brown may refer to:

- Ivan Brown (bobsleigh) (1908–1963), American bobsledder
- Ivan Brown (politician) (1922–1977), Australian politician
- Ivan Brown (Canadian football) (born 1985), Canadian football player
