= Figure skating at the 1936 Winter Olympics – Pairs =

Figure skating at the Olympics

Pairs at the IV Olympic Winter Games
- Venue: Olympia-Kunsteisstadion
- Date: 13 February 1936
- Competitors: 36 from 12 nations

Medalists
1st place, gold medalist(s)		Maxi Herber / Ernst Baier	Germany
2nd place, silver medalist(s)		Ilse Pausin / Erik Pausin	Austria
3rd place, bronze medalist(s)		Emília Rotter / László Szollás	Hungary

The pair skating event was held as part of the figure skating at the 1936 Winter Olympics. It was the sixth appearance of the event, which had previously been held twice at the Summer Olympics in 1908 and 1920 and at all three Winter Games from 1924 onward. The competition was held on Thursday, 13 February 1936. Thirty-six figure skaters from twelve nations competed.

== Results ==
The points and score are given as shown in the official Olympic report.

Rank	Name	Nation	Total points	Places
1	Maxi Herber / Ernst Baier	Germany	11.5	11
2	Ilse Pausin / Erik Pausin	Austria	11.4	19.5
3	Emília Rotter / László Szollás	Hungary	10.8	32.5
4	Piroska Szekrényessy / Attila Szekrényessy	Hungary	10.6	38.5
5	Maribel Vinson / George Hill	United States	10.4	46.5
6	Louise Bertram / Stewart Reburn	Canada	9.8	68.5
7	Violet Cliff / Leslie Cliff	Great Britain	10.1	56.5
8	Eva Prawitz / Otto Weiß	Germany	9.5	74.5
9	Anna Cattaneo / Ercole Cattaneo	Italy	9.1	93
10	Rosemarie Stewart / Ernest Yates	Great Britain	9.0	102.5
11	Grace Madden / J. Lester Madden	United States	9.1	95
12	Audrey Garland / Fraser Sweatman	Canada	8.7	105
13	Irina Timcic / Alfred Eisenbeisser-Fieraru	Romania	9.0	102
14	Eleanore Bäumel / Fritz Wächtler	Austria	8.8	113
15	Randi Bakke / Christen Christensen	Norway	8.2	132.5
16	Louise Contamine / Robert Verdun	Belgium	8.2	138.5
17	Hildegarde Švarce-Gešela / Eduards Gešels	Latvia	7.5	149
18	Helene Michelson / Eduard Hiiop	Estonia	6.8	161

Referee:

- (Germany) Hermann Wendt

Judges:

- (United States) Charles M. Rotch
- (Germany) Kurt Dannenberg
- (Sweden) August Anderberg
- (Switzerland) Arnold Huber
- (Austria) Hans Grünauer
- (Belgium) André Poplimont
- (Norway) Oscar Kolderup
- (Hungary) Jenő Minnich
- (Finland) Ludowika Jacobsson
