= Vonhof =

Vonhof is a German surname. Notable people with the surname include:

- Peter Vonhof (b. 1949), German cyclist
- Fritz Vonhof (b. 1907, fl. 1930s), German bobsledder

== See also ==
- Von Hoff
