= Karel Růžička =

Karel Růžička may refer to:

- Karel Růžička (bobsledder)
- Karel Růžička (pianist)
