= Claude Taittinger =

French businessman (1927–2022)

- Born: Claude Simon Pierre Marie Taittinger; 2 October 1927; Paris, France
- Died: 3 January 2022 (aged 94); Paris, France
- Occupation: Businessman

Claude Taittinger (2 October 1927 – 3 January 2022) was a French businessman. He was longtime director of Taittinger Champagne and was the son of Pierre Taittinger.

== Life and career ==
Following his studies at the Faculty of Law of Sciences Po, Taittinger entered the family wine business in 1949. He spent the remainder of his career there, with the exception of military served in French Indochina and French Algeria. In 1958, he married Catherine de Suarez d'Aulan, daughter of Jean de Suarez d'Aulan, with whom he had three daughters: Brigitte, Virginie, and Christine.

Taittinger became managing director of the family business after the accidental death of his brother, François, in 1960. He was also Chairman of the Société du Louvre and served on the advisory board of the Bank of France. To honor his father, who died in 1965, he founded the Prix culinaire international Pierre-Taittinger in 1967. In 1983, he created the Taittinger Collection, a collection of artwork used on champagne bottles. Artists who contributed to the collection included Victor Vasarely, Arman, André Masson, Maria Helena Vieira da Silva, Roy Lichtenstein, Hans Hartung, Toshimitsu Imaï, Corneille, Roberto Matta, and Zao Wou-Ki.

In 1987, Taittinger created the Domaine Carneros, in association with the Kobrand Corporation, to distribute Taittinger wine in the United States. He retired in 2006 following the company's purchase by Crédit Agricole. In 2008, his daughter, Virginie, left the family business and founded Champagne Virginie T. with her son, Ferdinand Pougatch. Taittinger was an Officer of the Legion of Honour and was decorated with the Ordre du Mérite militaire.

Taittinger died in Paris on 3 January 2022, at the age of 94.

== Publications ==
- Thibaud le Chansonnier, comte de Champagne (1987)
- Monsieur Cazotte monte à l'échafaud (1988) ISBN 9782262089085
- Saint Evremond ou le bon usage des plaisirs (1990) ISBN 9782262007652
- Champagne par Taittinger (1996) ISBN 9782234046306
