= Alexander Gruber =

German bobsledder

Medal record

Men's Bobsleigh

Representing Germany

World Championships
Gold medal – first place	1935 St. Moritz	Four-man

Alexander Gruber was a German bobsledder who competed in the 1930s. He won a gold medal in the four-man event at the 1935 FIBT World Championships in St. Moritz.
