= Hermann von Mumm =

German bobsledder

Medal record

Bobsleigh

World Championships
Silver medal – second place	1934 Engelberg	Two-man

Hermann von Mumm was a German bobsledder who competed in the 1930s. He won a silver medal in the two-man event at the 1934 FIBT World Championships in Engelberg.
