= Gustav Karl Theodor Friedrich Baermann =

Medical doctor and public health researcher

Gustav Karl Theodor Friedrich Baermann (7 February 1877-1950), was a medical doctor and researcher into public health in the early 20th century. He worked for the former Dutch East Indies administration as a foreign scientist. He was the originator of the Baermann Technique for the extraction of larval roundworms and published his seminal work in 1917.

== Biography ==
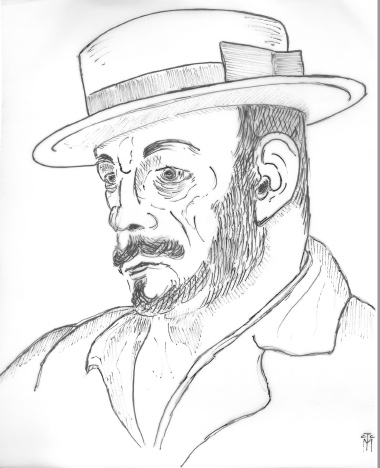
Gustav Baermann (1877-1950)

Baermann was born in Breslau, former Prussia, now Poland to Heinrich Baermann (1841-1918) and Anna Mathilde Carolina née Dompierre (1843-1931). In 1897 he became lifetime member of the Corps Bavaria in Munich, with the reception number 1254. Baermann married his first wife, Eva Helene Emilie Erika Weinbach on 31 December 1904 in Breslau, former Prussia, now Poland.

He studied for his PhD at Universität Breslau, and graduated in 1905. Baermann worked with and contributed to the work of Albert Neisser whom he accompanied on his expeditions to Java in 1905 and 1907 to study venereal diseases in humans. In 1905 Neisser organised a privately funded expedition to Java. This island was chosen because of information that syphilis was more prevalent there than on Borneo or Sumatra. Participants included his wife and at least one of his trainees, Gustav Baermann. According to Neisser, at any one time they had 10-20 orang-utans, imported from Borneo, 20-30 gibbons and 600-800 monkeys (mainly macaques) in captivity. Many also died, not of pneumonia as in Breslau, but of gastroenteritis. Apes were more easily infected with syphilis than monkeys. The incubation period typically was 3–5 weeks. To test for the dissemination of the pathogen, tissue was taken from various organs of infected animals and inserted into healthy ones. It was found that marrow and, secondly, spleen were the most consistent sites of the pathogen. Blood was never infectious. Although secondary lesions occurred only in apes, it was demonstrated that unresponsiveness did not indicate lack of dissemination in monkeys. While they were in Java in 1905, Fritz Schaudinnn (1871-1906) and Erich Hoffmann (1868-1959) in Berlin discovered the Spirochaeta pallida, the pathogen of syphilis. How Neisser learned of this discovery is uncertain, but he at once attempted to verify the finding. This was successful in humans, as well as in a few apes and monkeys.

Neisser credited most of this work to Baermann. A government-funded second expedition to Java was made in 1906–07. In this, in addition to continuing the experiments with primates and monkeys, attempts were made to transmit syphilis to other mammals and chickens. Success occurred only in guinea pigs, but thereby introduced a more practical animal for syphilis experimentation. This investigation, to which Rudolf Pürckhauer was assigned, continued in Breslau until 1909.

It is not clear if Baermann remained in the far-east or spent the intervening years in Breslau, however in the 1920s, he worked in Sumatra (now Indonesia) as Chief Doctor and Director of the Central Hospital at Petoembooekam (South-east Sumatra - now Indonesia)

Baermann later remarried Nina Marie Victorine Wetter (1896-1972) and they lived in Deli-Medan, Indonesia (former Dutch East Indies) raising a family of three children. While in Indonesia (former Dutch East Indies) he published a number of works on public health and parasitic disease, and he was active in trying to improve medical facilities in Deli-Medan. He returned to Germany in the early 1930s setting up a medical practice. German telephone books list him from 1932 as a general practice doctor in Munich, which continue until 1947. He died in 1950.

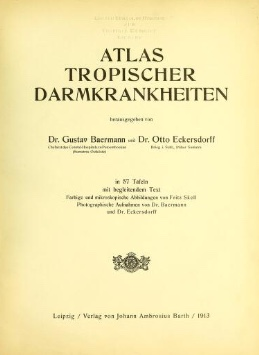
Baermann, G.; Eckersdorff, O. Atlas tropischer Darmkrankheiten Publisher: Leipzig, J.A. Barth, 1913.

=== The Baermann Technique for the extraction of nematodes ===
The Baermann Technique involves taking a glass funnel (size depending on sample size) and affixing rubber tubing to the bottom end and closing with a Mohr or Bunsen clip. The funnel is then filled with sterilised water. A sample is held within a gauze and tied with string and suspended from a retort ring so that the sample touches the surface of the water. A light can be set up above the apparatus (in this way similar to the Tullgren-Berlese funnel).

Liquor from the bottom of the apparatus is removed periodically by opening the clip into a small beaker and drops from this examined under the microscope. Eggs can be enumerated using a haemocyctometer or Coulter counter. The extraction is a partial extraction with some estimates of approximately 50% of total sample content. If the sample is too dry, nematodes may find mobility within the sample difficult and if the sample is too wet, the sample will migrate into the water contaminating the extract. Typically a sample of 100 to 200g is used of a paste-like consistency. The method has been evaluated by Todd et al. (1970) and Dinaburg (1942)

== Bibliography ==
Baermann wrote extensively in his early career on parasitology and epidemiology exclusively in German, and his works are available in libraries worldwide, but mostly in Germany.

Die gonorrhoische Epidiymitis (PhD)

Author: Gustav Baermann. Dissertation: doctoral Universität Breslau 1905

Beiträge zur Pathologie und Therapie der Syphilis

Author: G Bärmann [SIC]; Albert Neisser. Publisher: Berlin : Verl. von J. Springer, 1911.

Series: Arbeiten aus dem K. Gesundheitsamte., 37 bd

Bericht über die unter finanzieller Beihilfe des Deutschen Reiches während der Jahre 1905–1909 in Batavia und Breslau ausgeführten Arbeiten zur Erforschung der Syphilis

Author: Albert Neisser; G Bärmann. Publisher: Berlin : Springer, 1911

Die spezifischen Veränderungen der Haut der Hände und Füße bei Frambösie, mit einigen allgemeinen Bemerkungen zur Frambösie und ihren Späterscheinungen : mit 27 Tafeln

Author: Gustav Baermann. Publisher: Leipzig : Barth, 1911.

Series: Archiv für Schiffs- und Tropenhygiene, 15, Beiheft 6

Die Assanierung der javanischen und chinesischen Arbeiterbestände der dem Serdang-Doctor-Fond, Deli-Sumatra, angeschlossenen Pflanzengebiete (Anchylostomiasis, Amöben- und Bazillendysenterie, Syphilis, Malaria, Typhus, Pneumonie, epidemische Zerebrospinal-Meningitis); nach einem in der Schlesischen Gesellschaft gehaltenen Vortrag

Author: Gustav Baermann; Siegfried Bettmann. Publisher:Leipzig : Barth, 1912.Series:Archiv für Schiffs- und Tropenhygiene, 16, Beiheft 5

Atlas tropischer Darmkrankheiten

Author: G Baermann; Otto Eckersdorff (with paintings by Fritz Skell) Publisher: Leipzig, J.A. Barth, 1913.

Ankylostomiasis.

Author: Gustav Baermann. Publisher: Batavia Javasche Boelch. & Dr. 1914.

Die Behandlung der Surra mit "Bayer 205"

Author: Gustav Baermann. Publisher: Leipzig, Barth, 1922. Series:Archiv für Schiffs- und Tropenhygiene, Pathologie u. Therapie exotischer Krankheiten, 26, Beih. 2.

== Impact ==
As well as being extensively used for parasitology in the faeces of mammals including humans, the technique has also been adapted for examination of leaf litter, and marine sediment, soils. The method has also been used for the extraction of soil rotifers; and various modifications have been suggested such as using detergents e.g. Rohrbacher (1957)
