= Emilio Dell'Oro =

Italian bobsledder

Emilio Dell'Oro (born 2 January 1910; date of death 8 August 1983) was an Italian bobsledder who competed in the 1930s.

He finished tenth in the four-man event at the 1936 Winter Olympics in Garmisch-Partenkirchen, Germany.
