= Arnold Gartmann =

Swiss bobsledder (1904–1980)

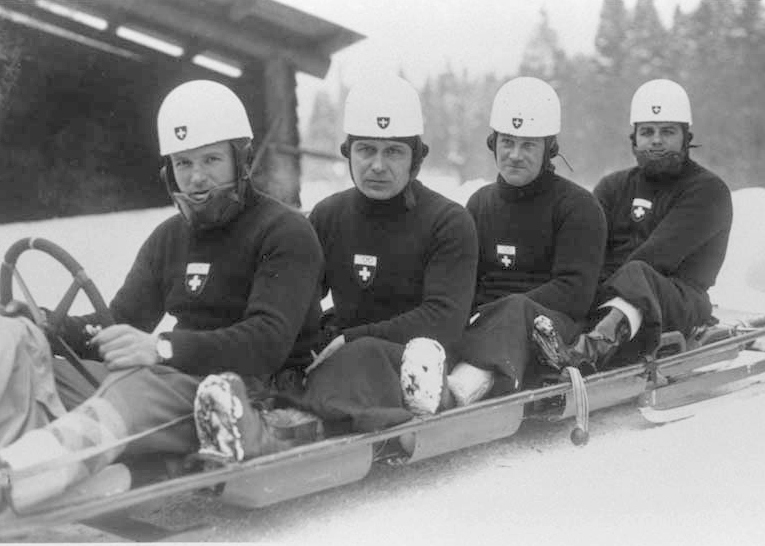
- Pierre Musy, Charles Bouvier, Joseph Beerli and Arnold Gartmann in 1936

Personal information
- Nationality: Swiss
- Born: 20 November 1904 St. Moritz, Switzerland
- Died: 4 June 1980 (aged 75) St. Moritz, Switzerland

Sport
- Sport: Bobsleigh
Medal record
Bobsleigh
Representing Switzerland
Olympic Games
Gold medal – first place	1936 Garmisch-Partenkirchen	Four-man
World Championships
Silver medal – second place	1935 St. Moritz	Four-man

Arnold "Noldi" Gartmann (20 November 1904 – 4 June 1980) was a Swiss bobsledder who competed in the late 1930s. He won a gold medal in the four-man event at the 1936 Winter Olympics in Garmisch-Partenkirchen.

Gartmann also won a silver medal in the four-man event at the 1935 FIBT World Championships in St. Moritz.
