= John Shene =

American bobsledder

Personal information
- Nationality: American
- Born: 17 January 1901 Wilmington, New York, US
- Died: 17 January 1968 (aged 67) Lake Placid, New York, US

Sport
- Sport: Bobsleigh

John Shene (17 January 1901 - 17 January 1968) was an American bobsledder who competed in the 1930s. He finished fourth in the four-man event at the 1936 Winter Olympics in Garmisch-Partenkirchen.
