= Richard Lorenz (bobsleigh) =

Austrian bobsledder

Personal information
- Nationality: Austrian
- Born: 1 March 1901 Innsbruck, Austria-Hungary
- Died: 13 June 1953 (aged 52) Innsbruck, Austria

Sport
- Sport: Bobsleigh

Richard Lorenz (1 March 1901 – 13 June 1953) was an Austrian bobsledder who competed from the late 1920s to the mid-1930s. Competing in two Winter Olympics, he earned his best finish of 11th in the four-man event at Garmisch-Partenkirchen in 1936. In 1928 he finished 22nd in the four-man event.

He is the younger brother of fellow bobsledder Franz Lorenz.
