= Ernesto Franceschi =

Italian bobsledder (1912–1943)

Personal information
- Nationality: Italian
- Born: 16 March 1912; Cortina d'Ampezzo, Austria-Hungary
- Died: 21 February 1943 (aged 30); Cortina d'Ampezzo, Italy

Sport
- Sport: Bobsleigh

Ernesto Franceschi (26 March 1912 – 21 February 1943) was an Italian bobsledder who competed in the mid-1930s. He competed in the four-man event at the 1936 Winter Olympics in Garmisch-Partenkirchen, but did not finish.
