= Eduard Brücklmeier =

German diplomat and resistance fighter (1903–1944)

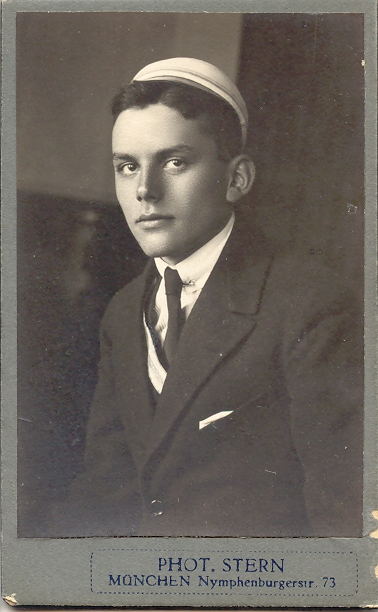
Eduard Brücklmeier as a Young Student and member of Corps Bavaria

Eduard Robert Wolfgang Brücklmeier (8 June 1903 – 20 October 1944) was a German diplomat and resistance fighter against the Nazi régime, who was executed as a result of his association with the 20 July Plot.

== Life ==
Brücklmeier was born in Munich, where in 1923 he began his study of law and became member of the noble Corps Bavaria Munich, before moving to Leipzig, Würzburg and Lausanne. In 1927, he passed the first state examination in Würzburg and in May entered the Foreign Office's three-year preparatory programme. On completing it in 1930, he was posted abroad as a diplomat.

In 1933, the year the Nazi Party seized power in Germany, Brücklmeier found himself dealing with minority issues while working at the Consulate General in Katowice. This led to his first conflict with Nazi authorities. In 1936, he was appointed diplomatic secretary at the German Embassy in London, headed by German dictator Adolf Hitler's future Foreign Minister, Joachim von Ribbentrop.

In 1937, Brücklmeier married Klothilda von Obermayer-Marnach. They had one daughter, Monika, who later married Friedrich Mandl. Brücklmeier also joined the Nazi Party, having originally submitted his application to join in 1934.

The following year, 1938, Brücklmeier and Ribbentrop returned to Berlin. By that time both Brücklmeier and Foreign Office State Secretary Ernst von Weizsäcker were hoping that German dissenters, working with the British government, could thwart Hitler's ever more evident plans for war. In 1939, however, he was denounced for making "defeatist" statements and was very nearly sent to a concentration camp. Instead, however – apparently at the instigation of the chief of the Reich Security Main Office (Reichssicherheitshauptamt, RSHA), Reinhard Heydrich – he was given early retirement from the Foreign Office.

Following his departure, Brücklmeier underwent military service in France; became a Wehrmacht staff member at the Foreign Testing Centre in Berlin; and then became a military administrator in the State Administration Office of the Army High Command (Oberkommando des Heeres). In 1942, he was called up to a Landesschützenbataillon (a kind of rear-guard and occupation duty infantry, mainly older men).

By this time, Brücklmeier had established extensive links with the resistance fighters that took part in the 20 July Plot to assassinate Hitler. Friedrich Werner von der Schulenburg, who had come to know Brücklmeier while he was working at the Tehran diplomatic mission during 1930 and 1931, arranged contacts between Brücklmeier and the plot's core membership.

Brücklmeier wished to support the plot's attempted coup d'état, but was not informed that it had been delayed to 20 July. One week later, on 27 July, following the plot's failure, Brücklmeier's involvement was traced. He was arrested in Prague and, from 28 to 29 September, his case was heard at the German "People's Court" (Volksgerichtshof). On 20 October, he was found guilty as an accessory and sentenced to death. On the same day Brücklmeier was hanged at Plötzensee Prison in Berlin.

== See also ==
- List of members of the 20 July plot
- Widerstand

== Sources ==
- Plötzensee Prison
- Detlef Graf von Schwerin: Dann sind's die besten Köpfe, die man henkt – Die junge Generation im deutschen Widerstand, München, 1991.
- Sebastian Sigler: Brücklmeier – Mann des 20. Juli, in: Sigler: Freundschaft und Toleranz, München, 2006.
- Sebastian Sigler: Eduard Brücklmeier – ein Mann des Widerstands am 20. Juli 1944, in: Einst und Jetzt (history yearbook), 52, 2007, S. 313–334.
