= Franz Lorenz =

Austrian bobsledder

Personal information
- Nationality: Austrian
- Born: 3 February 1897 Innsbruck, Austria-Hungary
- Died: 13 March 1972 (aged 75) Innsbruck, Austria

Sport
- Sport: Bobsleigh

Franz Lorenz (3 February 1897 – 13 March 1972) was an Austrian bobsledder who competed from the late 1920s to the mid-1930s.

Competing in two Winter Olympics, he earned his best finish of 11th in the four-man event at Garmisch-Partenkirchen in 1936. In 1928 he finished 22nd in the four-man event.

He is the older brother of fellow bobsledder Richard Lorenz.
