= Martial van Schelle =

Belgian sportsman

Martial Van Schelle
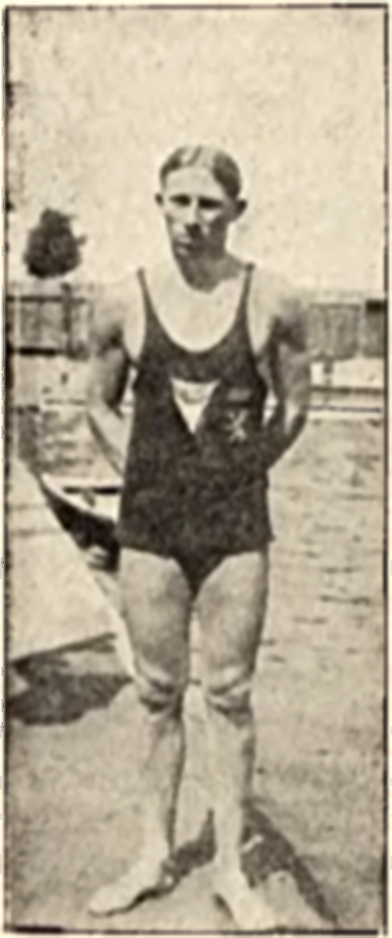
- Born: 6 July 1899; Hoogstraten, Belgium
- Died: 15 March 1943 (aged 43); Breendonk, Belgium
- Other names: Ti
- Occupations: aviator, bobsledder, businessman, swimmer
- Known for: Olympic competition

Martial Albert Fowler Van Schelle (sometimes shown as Martial van Schelle, 6 July 1899 – 15 March 1943) was a Belgian bobsledder, swimmer, aviator, and businessman who competed in both the Summer and Winter Olympics for Belgium from the early 1920s to the late 1930s. He was captured by the Nazis during World War II and executed in a concentration camp.

== Early life ==
Born in 1899, Van Schelle spent the early part of his life in the United States. Living in Chicago, Illinois from 1904 to 1918, he lost his mother Annie when she was killed aboard the RMS Lusitania when it was sunk in 1915 by a German U-boat. This resulted in him joining the American Expeditionary Force which landed in France in 1918 as a doughboy. Following the end of hostilities of World War I, Van Schelle stayed over in Belgium to help the nation rebuild.

== Sporting career ==
Competing in three Summer Olympics, Van Schelle's best finish was 10th in the men's 4 × 200 m freestyle relay at Paris in 1924. Van Schelle also participated in ballooning in the Gordon Bennett Cup twice, finishing fifth in 1933 and seventh in 1938. At the 1936 Winter Olympics in Garmisch-Partenkirchen, Van Schelle competed in bobsleigh. He finished fifth in the four-man competition and ninth in the two-man event.

== Business career ==
Van Schelle owned a sporting goods store in Brussels, earning an American patent for a tennis racket in 1935. He later became the owner of two Ice rinks in Brussels between 1933 and 1935, remaining the owner until he was arrested by the Nazis on 15 January 1943.

== Death ==
Taken away to Breendonk concentration camp, Van Schelle was executed by shooting on 15 March 1943.
