= Eduards Gešels =

Latvian figure skater

Personal information
- Full name: Eduards Harijs Herberts Gešels
- Nationality: Latvian
- Born: 19 May 1902; Riga, Russian Empire
- Died: 25 August 1975 (aged 73); Nürnberg

Sport
- Sport: Figure skating

Eduards Harijs Herberts Gešels (19 May 1902 – 25 August 1975), also known as Eduard Harry Herbert Goeschel, was a Latvian figure skater. He competed in the pairs event at the 1936 Winter Olympics.
