= Vasile Dumitrescu =

Romanian bobsledder

Medal record

Bobsleigh

World Championships
Gold medal – first place	1934 Engelberg	Two-man

Vasile Dumitrescu is a Romanian bobsledder who competed in the 1930s. He won the gold medal in the two-man event at the 1934 FIBT World Championships in Engelberg.
