= FIBT World Championships 1935 =

Winter sport competition

1935 World Championships
- Location: Igls, Austria; St. Moritz, Switzerland

The FIBT World Championships 1935 took place in Igls, Austria (Two-man) and in St. Moritz, Switzerland (Four-man). St. Moritz hosted the four-man event previously in 1931.

== Two man bobsleigh ==
Pos	Team	Time
Gold	Switzerland (Reto Capadrutt, Emil Diener)	
Silver	Czechoslovakia (Josef Lanzendörfer, Karel Ruzicka)	
Bronze	Italy (Marchese Storza Brivio, Carlo Solveni)	

== Four man bobsleigh ==
Pos	Team	Time
Gold	Germany (Hanns Killian, Alexander Gruber, Hermann von Valta, Sebastian Huber)	
Silver	Switzerland (Pierre Musy, Noldi Gartmann, Charles Bouvier, Josef Beerli)	
Bronze	Switzerland (Reto Capadrutt, Fritz Feierabend, A. Lardi, H. Tami)	

== Medal table ==
Rank	Nation	Gold	Silver	Bronze	Total
1	Switzerland (SUI)	1	1	1	3
2	Germany (GER)	1	0	0	1
3	Czechoslovakia (TCH)	0	1	0	1
4	Italy (ITA)	0	0	1	1
Totals (4 entries)		2	2	2	6
