= Franz Hayler =

Nazi politician and SS-Gruppenführer (1900–1972)

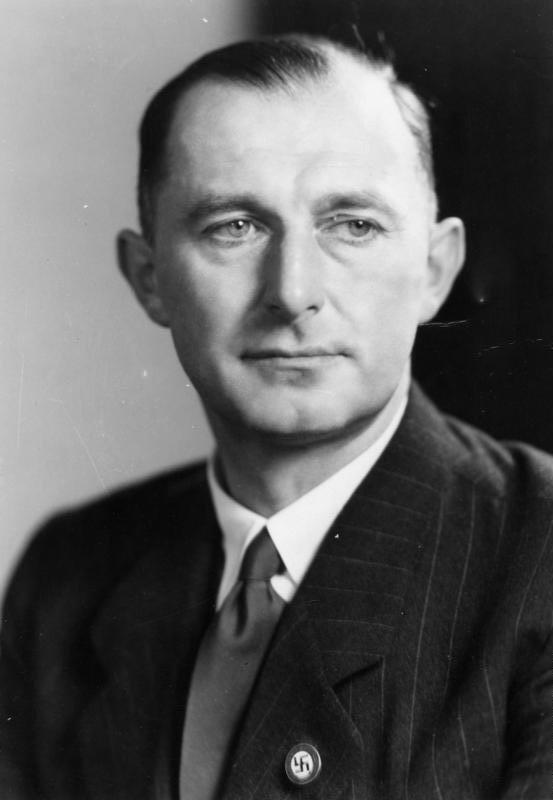
- Hayler in 1944

State Secretary Reich Ministry of Economics
- In office 20 November 1943 – 8 May 1945
- Preceded by: Friedrich Landfried
- Succeeded by: Office abolished

Personal details
- Born: 29 August 1900 Schwarzenfeld, Kingdom of Bavaria, German Empire
- Died: 11 September 1972 (aged 72) Aschau im Chiemgau, Free State of Bavaria, West Germany
- Party: Nazi Party
- Occupation: Businessman
- Civilian awards: Blood Order

Military service
- Allegiance: German Empire; Nazi Germany
- Branch/service: Bavarian Army; Schutzstaffel
- Years of service: 1917–1918; 1933–1945
- Rank: SS-Gruppenführer
- Unit: 3rd Royal Bavarian Foot Artillery Regiment
- Battles/wars: World War I World War II
- Military awards: Silesian Eagle; Knight's Cross of the War Merit Cross

Franz Hayler (29 August 1900 – 11 September 1972) was a German self-employed businessman who rose during the Third Reich to become State Secretary in the Reich Ministry of Economics and deputy to the Reich Economics Minister. He was a member of the Nazi Party and an SS-Gruppenführer.

== Early life ==
Hayler was the son of a Munich doctor. He attended Volksschule and a humanistic Gymnasium. He joined the 3rd Royal Bavarian Foot Artillery Regiment in 1917 and fought in the First World War. He became involved in German nationalism early on, fighting with the Freikorps Oberland in 1919 against the Bavarian Soviet Republic, in the Ruhr area and Upper Silesia, and earning the Silesian Eagle, first class. He then studied political science in Munich, earning a doctorate and was a member of the Corps Bavaria Munich student association. In November 1923, he was a participant in Adolf Hitler's failed Beer Hall Putsch, and would later be awarded the Blood Order.

== Business career ==
Hayler, who had been a self-employed businessman since 1927, also held executive positions in several business associations, becoming the leader of the Association of German Merchants of Colonial Goods, Delicatessen and Food Retail in June 1933, the leader of the Wirtschaftsgruppe Einzelhandel (Retail Business Group) in May 1934, and leader of the Reichsgruppe Handel (Reich Trade Group) in May 1938. In 1941, he was made a member of the Reichsvereinigung Kohle (Reich Coal Association). He also sat on the supervisory boards of the Deutsche Industriebank in Berlin and the Berlinische Lebensversicherung, a large life insurance company.

== SS service ==
In mid-1933, Hayler joined the SS (membership no. 64,697), being commissioned an SS-Untersturmführer on 4 April 1934. Later assigned to the main office of the SD, the Nazi Party's intelligence service, he rose to SS-Oberführer on 10 September 1939. He would later be promoted to SS-Brigadeführer and, finally, SS-Gruppenführer in 1943. On 17 August 1944, he was awarded the Knight's Cross of the War Merit Cross.

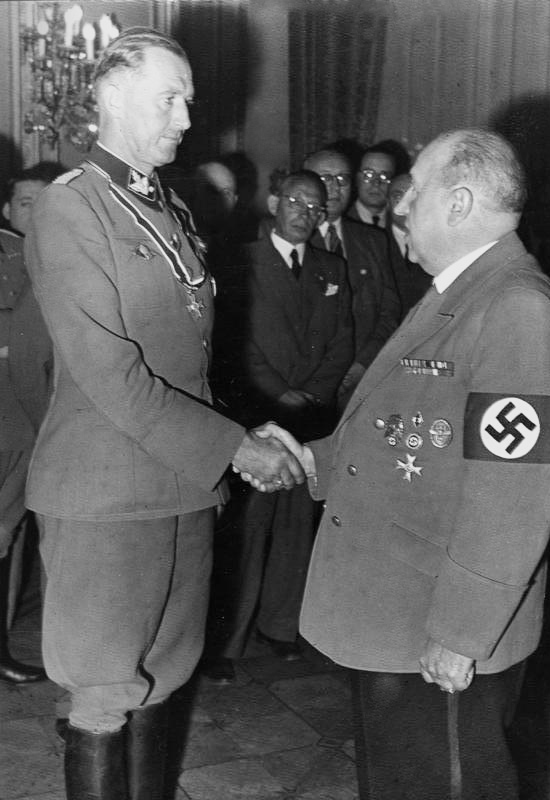
Hayler being awarded the Knight's Cross of the War Merit Cross by Walther Funk (right)

== Political career and post-war ==
On 1 December 1931, Hayler joined the Nazi Party (membership number 754,133). In the March 1936 Reichstag election, he stood for office but was not elected. However, on 11 September 1942, he was selected as a deputy to the Reichstag from electoral constituency 17 (Westphalia North) and continued to serve until the fall of the Nazi regime. Hayler entered the Reich Ministry of Economics in November 1943, succeeding Friedrich Landfried as State Secretary, the senior civil service position in the ministry. He also served as the deputy to Walther Funk, the Reichsminister of Economics. He was a member of the Freundeskreis der Wirtschaft (Circle of Friends of the Economy), a group of German industrialists whose aim was to strengthen the ties between the Nazi Party and business and industry. He also held the post of Wehrwirtschaftsführer (Military Economic Leader).

After Germany's defeat in the Second World War in 1945, Hayler was interned for several years. He appeared on 7 May 1946 at the Nuremberg Trials as a defense witness on Funk's behalf. In the post-war period he worked as an entrepreneur and investor in Munich.

== Sources ==
- Klee, Ernst (2007). Das Personenlexikon zum Dritten Reich. Wer war was vor und nach 1945. Frankfurt-am-Main: Fischer-Taschenbuch-Verlag. ISBN 978-3-596-16048-8.
- Schiffer Publishing Ltd., ed. (2000). SS Officers List: SS-Standartenführer to SS-Oberstgruppenführer (As of 30 January 1942). Schiffer Military History Publishing. ISBN 0-7643-1061-5.
