= Hildegarde Švarce-Gešela =

Latvian figure skater (1907–1944)

- Born: 29 October 1907; Jelgava, Latvia
- Died: 4 December 1944 (aged 37); Heilbronn, Nazi Germany

Figure skating career
- Country: Latvia

Hildegarde Švarce-Gešela (29 October 1907 – 4 December 1944) was a Latvian figure skater. She competed in the mixed pairs at the 1936 Winter Olympics. She died in an air raid on Heilbronn.
