= Bozon (surname) =

Bozon is a surname. Notable people with the surname include:

- Alain Bozon, French ice hockey player and curler
- Alicia Bozon, French swimmer
- Anatole Bozon, French bobsledder
- Charles Bozon (1932–1964), French alpine skier
- Gilbert Bozon (1935–2007), French swimmer
- Kévin Bozon (born 1995), French ice hockey player
- Michel Bozon, French alpine skier
- Nicholas Bozon, Anglo-Norman writer
- Philippe Bozon, French ice hockey player
- Serge Bozon, French film director, film critic and actor
- Tim Bozon, French ice hockey player
