= Charles Bouvier =

Swiss footballer and bobsledder (1898–1964)

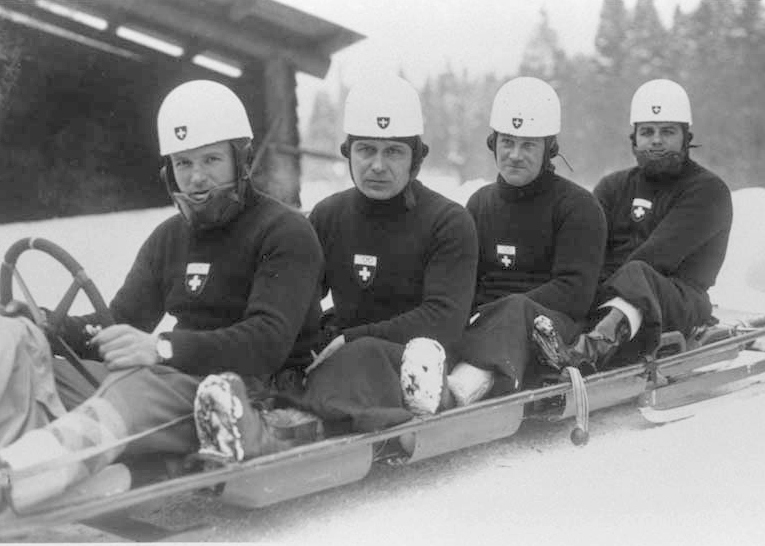
- Pierre Musy, Charles Bouvier, Joseph Beerli and Arnold Gartmann in 1936

Medal record

Football

Olympic Games
Silver medal – second place	1924 Paris	Team

Men's Bobsleigh

Olympic Games
Gold medal – first place	1936 Garmisch-Partenkirchen	Four-man

World Championships
Silver medal – second place	1935 St. Moritz	Four-man

Charles Bouvier (24 August 1898 – October 1964) was a Swiss footballer and bobsledder. He won gold in the four-man bobsleigh at the 1936 Winter Olympics.

== Football career ==
Bouvier began his career in football as a full-back, playing for Swiss club Servette FC. Bouvier also appeared for the Switzerland national team, earning five caps.

At the 1924 Summer Olympics in Paris, Bouvier was a member of the Switzerland squad in football which won the silver medal, finishing as runners-up to Uruguay. However, he did not appear during the tournament.

== Bobsleigh career ==
Bouvier won a gold medal in the four-man bobsleigh at the 1936 Winter Olympics in Garmisch-Partenkirchen and finished seventh in the two-man event at those same games.

He also won a silver medal in the four-man event at the 1935 FIBT World Championships in St. Moritz.
