= Hermann von Valta =

German bobsledder (1900–1968)

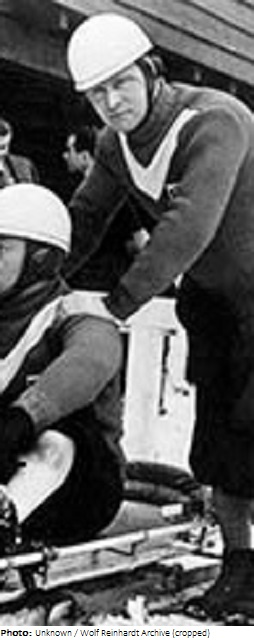

Personal information
- Nationality: German
- Born: 27 August 1900 Munich, German Empire
- Died: 27 November 1968 (aged 68) Garmisch-Partenkirchen, West Germany

Sport
- Sport: Bobsleigh
Medal record
Men's Bobsleigh
Representing Germany
World Championships
Gold medal – first place	1934 Garmisch-Partenkirchen	Four-man
Gold medal – first place	1935 St. Moritz	Four-man

Hermann von Valta (27 August 1900 – 27 November 1968) was a German bobsledder who competed in the 1930s. He won two gold medals in the four-man event at the FIBT World Championships (1934, 1935). Valta also competed at the 1936 Winter Olympics in Garmisch-Partenkirchen, finishing fifth in the two-man event and seventh in the four-man event.

Valta studied at the Ludwig-Maximilians-Universität München and became a member of Corps Bavaria Munich in 1920.
