= Gilbert Colgate =

American businessman and bobsledder

Personal information
- Full name: Gilbert Bayard Colgate Jr.
- Born: 21 December 1899 New York City, US
- Died: 9 October 1965 (aged 65) New York City, US

Sport
- Sport: Bobsleigh
Medal record
Bobsleigh
Representing United States
Olympic Games
Bronze medal – third place	1936 Garmisch-Partenkirchen	Two-man

Gilbert Bayard Colgate Jr. (December 21, 1899 – October 9, 1965) was an American businessman and bobsledder who competed in the 1930s. He won the bronze medal in the two-man event at the 1936 Winter Olympics in Garmisch-Partenkirchen, with teammate Richard Lawrence.

Colgate, a 1922 Yale University graduate, and brother of the Delta Kappa Epsilon fraternity (Phi chapter); was also one of five children of Gilbert Colgate Sr., who was the great-grandson of William Colgate, who founded what is now the Colgate-Palmolive Company. He served as a director of the Colgate company and was chairman of the Colgate-Larsen Aircraft Company. Gil Colgate was concerned about the population explosion and became one of the founders of Planned Parenthood.
