= Ewald Menzl =

Czechoslovak bobsledder (1908–1942)

Personal information
- Full name: Ewald Bruno Menzl
- Nationality: Czechoslovak
- Born: 12 July 1908 Úšovice, Austria-Hungary
- Died: 10 September 1942 (aged 34)

Sport
- Sport: Bobsleigh

Ewald Menzl (12 July 1908 – 10 September 1942) was a bobsledder who competed for Czechoslovakia in the mid-1930s. At the 1936 Winter Olympics in Garmisch-Partenkirchen he competed in the four-man event, but did not finish the first run.
