= Émile Kleber =

French bobsledder

Emile Kleber
Personal information
- Full name: Emile Auguste Francois Kleber
- Nationality: French
- Born: 23 April 1899; Thoissey, France
- Died: 6 August 1979 (aged 80); Aix-les-Bains, France

Sport
- Sport: Bobsleigh

Émile Kleber (April 23, 1899 – August 6, 1979) was a French bobsledder who competed in the mid-1930s. He finished 21st in the two-man event at the 1936 Winter Olympics in Garmisch-Partenkirchen.
