= Ordre du Mérite militaire (France) =

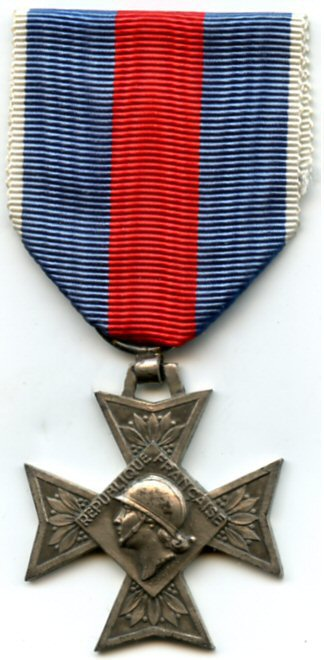
- Knight of the Ordre du Mérite militaire

Awarded by France
- Type: Order with three degrees:
- Status: Deprecated 3 December 1963 by the Ordre National du Mérite
- Grades: Commandeur; Officier; Chevalier

Precedence
- Next (higher): Ordre du Mérite Maritime

The Ordre du Mérite militaire (Order of Military Merit) was a ministerial order of merit of France created on 22 March 1957 to recognize the contributions of active members of the military reserves during times of peace. The order was administered and awarded the Ministry of Defence. The order was created to replace the Croix des services militaires volontaires established in 1934. Holders of the Cross were made members of the Ordre du Mérite militaire, bronze holders as knights, silver holders as officers, and gold holders as commanders.

The Order was deprecated by decree on 3 December 1963, and superseded by the Ordre national du Mérite. Extant members may continue to display their decorations.

== Classes ==
The Order has three classes:

- Commandeur (Commander)
- Officier (Officer)
- Chevalier (Knight)

Ribbon bars
Knight	Officer	Commander
