= Hans Bütikofer =

Swiss bobsledder (1915–2011)

Personal information
- Full name: Hans Eduard Bütikofer-Perret
- Nationality: Swiss
- Born: 29 July 1915 Chur, Switzerland
- Died: 12 January 2011 (aged 95) Thun, Switzerland

Sport
- Sport: Bobsleigh
Medal record
Bobsleigh
Representing Switzerland
Silver medal – second place	1936 Garmisch-Partenkirchen	Four-man

Hans Bütikofer (July 29, 1915 – January 12, 2011) was a Swiss bobsledder who competed in the late 1930s. He won the silver medal in the four-man event at the 1936 Winter Olympics in Garmisch-Partenkirchen, Germany.

He is the cousin of his teammate at the 1936 Winter Olympics Reto Capadrutt.
