= Rudolf Werlich =

German bobsledder

Rudolf Werlich (born October 4, 1910, date of death unknown) was a German bobsledder who competed in the mid-1930s. At the 1936 Winter Olympics in Garmisch-Partenkirchen he competed in the four-man event, but crashed in the first run.
