= Pierre Claret =

French ice hockey player

Personal information
- Nationality: French
- Born: 1 July 1911; Chamonix, France
- Died: 27 September 1981 (aged 70); Chamonix, France

Sport
- Sport: Ice hockey

Pierre Jean Marcel Claret (1 July 1911 – 27 September 1981) was a French ice hockey player. He competed in the men's tournament at the 1936 Winter Olympics. During World War II, he was imprisoned in both the Buchenwald and Mittelbau-Dora concentration camps.
