= Bianca Schenk =

Austrian figure skater

Bianca Schenk (24 April 1918 – 2 September 2000) was an Austrian figure skater. She competed at the 1936 Winter Olympics.
