= Philippe Boyard =

French ice hockey player

Personal information
- Nationality: French
- Born: 31 October 1916 Paris, France
- Died: 16 April 1969 (aged 52) Paris, France

Sport
- Sport: Ice hockey

Philippe Boyard (31 October 1916 – 16 April 1969) was a French ice hockey player. He competed in the men's tournament at the 1936 Winter Olympics. Boyard died in Paris on 16 April 1969, at the age of 52.
