= Guy Dugdale =

British bobsledder

Personal information
- Full name: Guy Carol Dugdale
- Nationality: British
- Born: 9 April 1905 Stratford-upon-Avon, England
- Died: 4 September 1982 (aged 77) Westminster, London, England

Sport
- Sport: Bobsleigh
Medal record
Bobsleigh
Representing United Kingdom
Olympic Games
Bronze medal – third place	1936 Garmisch-Partenkirchen	Four-man

Guy Carol Dugdale (9 April 1905 – 4 September 1982) was a British bobsledder who competed in the late 1930s. He won the bronze medal in the four-man event at the 1936 Winter Olympics in Garmisch-Partenkirchen, Germany.

== Personal life ==
Dugdale served in the Wiltshire Regiment during the Second World War.
