= Pierre Lorin =

French ice hockey player

Personal information
- Nationality: French
- Born: 25 October 1912 Paris, France
- Died: 16 March 1970 (aged 57) Milon-la-Chapelle, France

Sport
- Sport: Ice hockey

Pierre Michel Armand François Lorin (25 October 1912 – 16 March 1970) was a French ice hockey player. He competed in the men's tournament at the 1936 Winter Olympics.
