= Fernand Mermoud =

French cross-country skier (1913–1940)

Personal information
- Nationality: French
- Born: 20 August 1913; Chamonix, France
- Died: 9 June 1940 (aged 26); Évreux, France

Sport
- Sport: Cross-country skiing

Fernand Mermoud (20 August 1913 – 9 June 1940) was a French cross-country skier. He competed in the men's 18 kilometre event at the 1936 Winter Olympics. He was killed during the Second World War.

== Personal life ==
Mermoud served in the 6th Battalion, chasseurs alpins during the Second World War. He was killed in action in Evreux, Normandy, during the Battle of France on 9 June 1940.
