= Eleanore Bäumel =

Austrian figure skater

Personal information
- Nationality: Austrian
- Born: 21 February 1918
- Died: 24 July 2006; Vienna, Austria

Sport
- Sport: Figure skating

Eleanore Bäumel (21 February 1918 – 24 July 2006) was an Austrian figure skater. She competed in the pairs event at the 1936 Winter Olympics.
