= Rudolf Vojta =

Austrian ice hockey player (1912-1984)

- Born: 15 April 1912 Vienna, Austria-Hungary
- Died: 2 November 1984 (aged 72) Vienna, Austria
- Position: Defence
- Played for: Wiener EV
- National team: Austria
- Playing career: 1928–1949

Rudolf Vojta (15 April 1912 - 2 November 1984) was an Austrian ice hockey player who competed for the Austrian national team at the 1936 Winter Olympics in Garmisch-Partenkirchen.

== Playing career ==
Vojta made 10 appearances for the Austrian national team at the World Ice Hockey Championships between 1938 and 1949. He also represented his country at the 1936 Winter Olympics.

He played club hockey for Wiener EV in the Austrian Hockey Championship.
