= Jacques Morisson =

French ice hockey player

Personal information
- Nationality: French
- Born: 28 March 1907
- Died: 8 February 1964 (aged 56)

Sport
- Sport: Ice hockey

Jacques Morisson (28 March 1907 – 8 February 1964) was a French ice hockey player. He competed in the men's tournament at the 1936 Winter Olympics.
