= Alexandru Frim =

Romanian bobsledder

Medal record

Bobsleigh

World Championships
Gold medal – first place	1934 Engelberg	Two-man

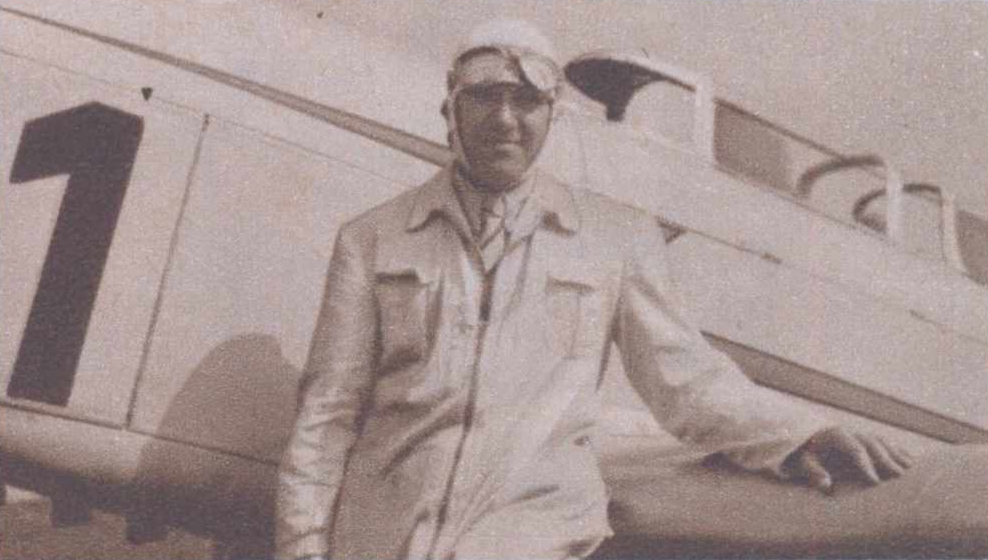
Alexandru Frim, 1938

Alexandru "Dudu" Frim (9 March 1908 in Râmnicu Sărat – 2 December 1985) was a Romanian bobsledder who competed in the 1930s. He won the gold medal in the two-man event at the 1934 FIBT World Championships. He also finished 15th in the two-man event at the 1936 Winter Olympics in Garmisch-Partenkirchen. Frim was also an aviator, earning his pilot license in 1931. Frim also won the Grand Prix of Sports Aviation and Cup of Brasov Aero-Club in 1939. Frim later participated in World War II as a pilot for Romania.
