= Crawford Merkel =

American bobsledder

Personal information
- Nationality: American
- Born: 25 June 1906 Hasbrouck Heights, New Jersey, US
- Died: March 1987 (aged 80) Frankfurt am Main, West Germany

Sport
- Sport: Bobsleigh

Crawford Merkel (June 25, 1906 – March 1987) was an American bobsledder who competed in the 1930s. He finished fourth in the four-man event at the 1936 Winter Olympics in Garmisch-Partenkirchen.
