= Robert Biswas-Diener =

American psychologist

Robert Biswas-Diener (born July 27, 1972) is a positive psychologist, author and instructor at Portland State University. Biswas-Diener's mother is Carol Diener and his father is Ed Diener, both psychologists.

Biswas-Diener's research focuses on income and happiness, culture and happiness, and positive psychology. Biswas-Diener's research has led him to areas such as India, Greenland, Israel, Kenya, and Spain, and he has been called the "Indiana Jones of positive psychology". He obtained his PhD in 2009 on "Material wealth and subjective well-being" from the University of Tromsø. Biswas-Diener is interested in looking into the difference between a procrastinator and what he calls an "incubator".

Biswas-Diener is an author of books and articles and sits on the editorial boards of the Journal of Happiness Studies and Journal of Positive Psychology. Biswas-Diener also co-founded The Strengths Project, a charity whose mission is to "help underprivileged individuals and groups realise their strengths to enhance quality of life and build on their life circumstances."

== Happiness ==
The psychological study of happiness is referred to as subjective well-being. Researchers are principally interested in the measurement, causes and consequences of being happy. Biswas-Diener has contributed to the study of happiness principally through his investigations of the well-being of groups traditionally overlooked by psychologists. These include the Amish, the Maasai and homeless people.

== Positive diagnosis ==
Positive psychologists have argued that there is a need create a taxonomy of “what goes right with people” as well as “what goes wrong with people.” Previous attempts have focused on uni-dimensional approaches such as identify individual strengths. Biswas-Diener has expanded on these approaches by creating a “multi-axial” approach to comprehensive diagnosis similar to the DSM Multi-axial Approach used in clinical psychology. His positive diagnosis model includes:

- Axis 1: Capacities (strengths and interests)
- Axis 2: Well-being (life satisfaction and psychological well-being)
- Axis 3: Future Orientation (hope and optimism)
- Axis 4: Situational Benefactors
- Axis 5: Values

== Incubators and procrastinators ==
Many researchers have examined the phenomenon of procrastination. Some researchers have noted that procrastination can be adaptive. Biswas-Diener has examined the work styles of people who knowingly procrastinate and allow mounting anxiety to propel them to high performance, albeit “at the last minute.” He has identified this work style as “incubator.”

== Strengths ==
A major area of interest within positive psychology theory and research has been on the topic of strengths. Strengths are disproportionately represented among publications in the Journal of Positive Psychology. Biswas-Diener and his colleagues argue that strengths are potentials rather than traits and that they can be cultivated through effort. Following from this argument is the idea that strengths can be over or underused and that “strengths development” is largely a matter of learning to use strengths appropriately to unique situations. They further argue that if used inappropriately strengths use may be associated with social costs or personal psychological harm.

== Courage ==
Biswas-Diener has written that courage consists of two separable processes: managing the emotion of fear and “boosting the willingness to act”. He suggests that courage consists of skills that can be learned.

== Books ==
- Jhangiani, R. & Biswas-Diener, R. (2017). Open:The philosophy and practices that are revolutionizing education and science.
- Kashdan, T. & Biswas-Diener, R. (2014). The Upside of Your Dark Side:Why being your whole self—not just your "good self"—drives success and fulfillment.
- Biswas-Diener, R. (2012). The Courage Quotient: How science can make you braver.
- Biswas-Diener, R. (2011). Positive psychology as social change.
- Biswas-Diener, Robert. (2010) Practicing Positive Psychology Coaching: Assessment, Diagnosis, and Intervention.
- Linley, A., Willars, J., & Biswas-Diener, R. (2010). The strengths book: Be confident, be successful, and enjoy better relationships by realising the best of you.
- Diener, Ed., and Biswas-Diener, Robert. (2008) Happiness: Unlocking the mysteries of psychological wealth.
- Biswas-Diener, R., and Ben Dean (2007) Positive Psychology Coaching (2007)
