= Lambert Neumaier =

Austrian ice hockey player (1910-1986)

- Born: 13 February 1910 Vienna, Austria-Hungary
- Died: July 8, 1986 (aged 76) Vienna, Austria
- Position: Centre
- Played for: Wiener EV
- National team: Austria
- Playing career: 1928–1941

Lambert Bernhard Neumaier (13 February 1910 - 8 July 1986) was an Austrian ice hockey player who competed for the Austrian national team at the 1936 Winter Olympics in Garmisch-Partenkirchen.

== Playing career ==
Neumaier made two appearances for the Austrian national team at the 1933 World Ice Hockey Championships. He also played two games for his country at the 1936 Winter Olympics.

He played club hockey for Wiener EV in the Austrian Hockey Championship.
