= Alfred Jacomis =

French cross-country skier (1910–2004)

Personal information
- Full name: Pierre Henri Alfred Jacomis
- Nationality: French
- Born: 9 July 1910; Laveissière, France
- Died: 17 June 2004 (aged 93); Labège, France

Sport
- Sport: Cross-country skiing

Alfred Jacomis (9 July 1910 – 17 June 2004) was a French cross-country skier. He competed in the men's 18 kilometre event at the 1936 Winter Olympics.
