= Fritz Wächtler (figure skater) =

Austrian figure skater (1906–1963)

Personal information
- Nationality: Austrian
- Born: 13 October 1906; Vienna, Austria-Hungary
- Died: 26 July 1963 (aged 56)

Sport
- Sport: Figure skating

Fritz Wächtler (13 October 1906 – 26 July 1963) was an Austrian figure skater. He competed in the pairs event at the 1936 Winter Olympics.
