= Alfred Rössner =

Austrian cross-country skier (1911-2005)

Alfred "Fred" Rössner (August 16, 1911 – December 25, 2005) was an Austrian cross-country skier who competed in the 1936 Winter Olympics. He was born in Sankt Johann am Tauern and died in Salzburg.

In 1936 he was a member of the Austrian relay team which finished eighth in the 4x10 km relay competition. In the 18 km event he finished 39th.
