= Erich Gallwitz =

Austrian cross-country skier (1912–1981)

Erich Gallwitz (5 July 1912 in Reutte – 1 October 1981 in Salzburg) was an Austrian cross-country skier who competed in the 1936 Winter Olympics.

In 1936 he was a member of the Austrian relay team which finished eighth in the 4x10 km relay competition. In the 18 km event he finished 41st.
