= Karel Růžička (bobsledder) =

Czech bobsledder (1909–?)

Medal record

Bobsleigh

World Championships
Silver medal – second place	1935 Igls	Two-man

Karel Růžička (born 11 May 1909; date of death unknown) was a Czech bobsledder who competed in the 1930s for Czechoslovakia. He won a silver medal in the two-man event at the 1935 FIBT World Championships in Igls.

Ruzicka also competed at the 1936 Winter Olympics in Garmisch-Partenkirchen, finishing 20th in the two-man event and did not finish the four-man event.
