= Teodor Popescu =

Romanian bobsledder

Medal record

Bobsleigh

Representing Romania

World Championships
| Silver medal – second place | 1934 Garmisch-Partenkirchen | Four-man |

Teodor Popescu was a non-starter Romanian bobsledder who competed in the 1930s. He won a silver medal in the four-man event at the 1934 FIBT World Championships in Garmisch-Partenkirchen.

At the 1936 Winter Olympics in Garmisch-Partenkirchen, Popescu was listed in the four-man event, but did not compete.
