= Kajetan Georg von Kaiser =

German chemist, researcher, and inventor (1803–1871)

Kajetan Georg von Kaiser (5 January 1803 – 28 August 1871) was a German chemistry professor, researcher and inventor.

== Biography ==
He was born at Kelheim on the Danube, in Bavaria, on 5 January 1803. He was appointed professor of technology at the Ludwig-Maximilians-Universität München in 1851, and, in 1868, became professor of applied chemistry at the Technical University of Munich.

His scientific researches into the chemistry of fermentation are of importance; a saccharometer invented by him in 1842 serves for the determination of the percentages of the contents of wort.

He died in Munich on 28 August 1871, aged 68.

== Writings ==
In addition to articles in scientific journals, he published the paper "Ueber Bieruntersuchungen und Fehler, welche dabei gemacht werden können" about researches into beer and their errors (Munich, 1846).

He also brought out the scientific works of his friend, the chemist and mineralogist Johann Nepomuk von Fuchs (d. 1856), under the title "Gesammelte Schriften des Joh. Nep. von Fuchs" (Munich, 1856), adding an obituary notice of that scientist.

== Sources ==
- Herbermann, Charles, ed. (1913). "Kajetan Georg von Kaiser". Catholic Encyclopedia. New York: Robert Appleton Company.
