= Eugen Freiherr von Gorup-Besanez =

Austrian-German chemist (1817–1878)

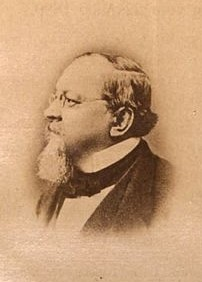
- Eugen Freiherr von Gorup-Besanez
- Born: 15 January 1817; Graz Austria
- Died: 24 November 1878 (aged 61); Erlangen Germany

Eugen Freiherr von Gorup-Besanez (15 January 1817 – 24 November 1878) was an Austrian-German chemist.

== Biography ==
He was educated in Graz and at Vienna, Padua, Munich, and Göttingen. He was appointed professor of chemistry at Erlangen in 1849. His researches on zoöchemical analysis are important: and his work entitled Anleitung zur qualitativen und quantitativen zoöchemischen Analyse (3d ed. 1871) is very valuable. His principal publication is the Lehrbuch der Chemie (vol. i., 7th ed. 1885; vol. ii., 6th ed. 1881; vol. iii., 4th ed. 1878), which has been translated into French and several other languages.

== Works ==
- Lehrbuch der Chemie für den Unterricht auf Universitäten, technischen Lehranstalten und für das Selbststudium :
  - 1. Lehrbuch der anorganischen Chemie. 2., verm. Aufl. 1863 Digital edition by the University and State Library Düsseldorf
  - 1. Lehrbuch der anorganischen Chemie. 3., mit bes. Berücks. d. neueren Theorien vollst. umgearb. u. verb. Aufl. 1868 Digital edition by the University and State Library Düsseldorf
  - 1. Lehrbuch der anorganischen Chemie für den Unterricht auf Universitäten, technischen Lehranstalten und für das Selbststudium. 4., mit bes. Berücks. d. neueren Theorien bearb. u. verb. Aufl. 1871 Digital edition by the University and State Library Düsseldorf
  - 2. Lehrbuch der organischen Chemie für den Unterricht auf Universitäten, technischen Lehranstalten und für das Selbststudium. 1862 Digital edition by the University and State Library Düsseldorf
  - 2. Lehrbuch der organischen Chemie für den Unterricht auf Universitäten, technischen Lehranstalten und für das Selbststudium. 3. umg. Aufl. 1868 Digital edition by the University and State Library Düsseldorf
  - 2. Lehrbuch der organischen Chemie für den Unterricht auf Universitäten, technischen Lehranstalten und für das Selbststudium. 4., mit bes. Berücks. d. neueren Theorien bearb. u. verb. Aufl. 1873 Digital edition by the University and State Library Düsseldorf
  - 3. Lehrbuch der physiologischen Chemie. 2. Aufl. 1867 Digital edition by the University and State Library Düsseldorf
