= Franz Schüßler =

Austrian ice hockey player (1911-1942)

- Born: 20 January 1911 Vienna, Austria
- Died: 28 September 1942 (aged 31) Tver, Soviet Union
- Position: Defence
- Played for: EK Engelmann Wien
- National team: Austria
- Playing career: 1930–1939

Franz Georg Wilhelm Schüßler (20 January 1911 – 28 September 1942) was an Austrian ice hockey player who competed for the Austrian national team at the 1936 Winter Olympics in Garmisch-Partenkirchen.

== Playing career ==
Schüßler made 15 appearances for the Austrian national team at the 1934 and 1935 World Championships. He played one game for his country at the 1936 Winter Olympics.

He played club hockey for EK Engelmann Wien in the Austrian Hockey Championship.
