= Wolfgang Kummer (bobsledder) =

German bobsledder

Personal information
- Full name: Wolfgang Max Friedrich Kummer
- Nationality: German
- Born: 24 August 1914; Erfurt, German Empire
- Died: 19 October 1988 (aged 74); Cologne, West Germany

Sport
- Sport: Bobsleigh

Wolfgang Kummer (August 24, 1914 – October 19, 1988) was a German bobsledder who competed in the mid-1930s. At the 1936 Winter Olympics in Garmisch-Partenkirchen, he competed in the four-man event, but crashed in the first run.
