= Max Bly =

American bobsledder

Personal information
- Full name: Max Theodore Bly Sr.
- Nationality: American
- Born: 7 April 1905 Lake George, New York, US
- Died: 19 January 1987 (aged 81) Duncanville, Texas, US

Sport
- Sport: Bobsleigh

Max T. Bly, Sr. (7 April 1905 - 19 January 1987) was an American bobsledder who competed in the 1930s. He finished sixth in the four-man event at the 1936 Winter Olympics in Garmisch-Partenkirchen.
