= Walter Heinzel =

Czechoslovak bobsledder

Personal information
- Born: 5 June 1907
- Died: 11 January 2002 (aged 94) Canada

Sport
- Country: Czechoslovakia
- Sport: Bobsleigh

Walter Heinzel was a bobsledder who competed for Czechoslovakia in the mid-1930s. He finished 12th in the four-man event at the 1936 Winter Olympics in Garmisch-Partenkirchen.
