= Viktor Wigelbeyer =

Austrian bobsledder

Personal information
- Full name: Viktor Johann Anton Wigelbeyer
- Nationality: Austrian
- Born: 13 December 1897 Semmering, Austria-Hungary
- Died: 4 September 1969 (aged 71)

Sport
- Sport: Bobsleigh

Viktor Wigelbeyer (13 December 1897 – 4 September 1969) was an Austrian bobsledder who competed in the mid-1930s. He finished 13th and last in completing the four runs in the four-man event at the 1936 Winter Olympics in Garmisch-Partenkirchen.
