= James Cardno =

Scottish bobsledder

Personal information
- Full name: James Farquhar Cardno
- Nationality: British
- Born: 25 May 1912 Fraserburgh, Scotland
- Died: 15 May 1975 (aged 62) Leeds, England

Sport
- Sport: Bobsleigh
Medal record
Bobsleigh
Representing United Kingdom
Olympic Games
Bronze medal – third place	1936 Garmisch-Partenkirchen	Four-man

James Farquhar Cardno (25 May 1912 – 15 May 1975) was a Scottish bobsledder who competed in the late 1930s. He won the bronze medal in the four-man event at the 1936 Winter Olympics in Garmisch-Partenkirchen, Germany and finished fourth in the two-man event at the same games.
