= Emil Seidler =

Austrian ice hockey player

- Born: 13 March 1914; Leoben, Austria
- Died: June 8, 1994 (aged 80)
- Position: Centre
- Played for: DSV Leoben
- National team: Austria
- Playing career: 1931–1939

Emil Herbert Seidler (13 March 1914 – 8 June 1994) was an Austrian ice hockey player who competed for the Austrian national team at the 1936 Winter Olympics in Garmisch-Partenkirchen. He made two appearances at the games. Seidler played club hockey for DSV Leoben.
