= Fritz Schwarz =

German bobsledder (1899–1961)

Personal information
- Full name: Friedrich Josef Schwarz
- Nationality: German
- Born: 14 August 1899 Garmisch, German Empire
- Died: 6 November 1961 (aged 62) Garmisch-Partenkirchen, West Germany

Sport
- Sport: Bobsleigh
Medal record
Men's Bobsleigh
Representing Germany
World Championships
Gold medal – first place	1934 Garmisch-Partenkirchen	Four-man
Silver medal – second place	1934 Engelberg	Two-man

Fritz Schwarz (14 August 1899 - 6 November 1961) was a German bobsledder who competed in the 1930s. He won two medals at the 1934 FIBT World Championships with a gold in the four-man and a silver in the two-man event.

Schwarz also finished seventh in the four-man event at the 1936 Winter Olympics in Garmisch-Partenkirchen.
