= 1931–32 Serie A (ice hockey) season =

Italian professional ice hockey season

The 1931–32 Serie A season was the sixth season of the Serie A, the top level of ice hockey in Italy. SG Cortina won the championship by defeating Hockey Club Milano in the final.

== Qualification round ==
=== Western Group ===
- Excelsior Milano - Ambrosiano Milano 2:1
- Hockey Club Milano II - Excelsior Milano 2:1

	Club	GP	W	T	L	Goals	Pts
1.	Hockey Club Milano II	1	1	0	0	2:1	2
2.	Excelsior Milano	2	1	0	1	3:3	2
3.	Ambrosiano Milano	1	0	0	1	1:2	0

=== Eastern Group ===
	Club	GP	W	T	L	Goals	Pts
1.	SG Cortina	2	2	0	0	35:2	4
2.	SG Cortina II	2	1	0	1	7:18	2
3.	Ortisei	2	0	0	2	6:28	0

== Final Qualification ==
- SG Cortina - Hockey Club Milano II 0:0 (after 3 overtimes), 7:0

== Final ==
- SG Cortina - Hockey Club Milano 2:1
