= FIBT World Championships 1934 =

Winter sport competition

1934 World Championships
- Location: Engelberg, Switzerland; Garmisch-Partenkirchen, Germany

The FIBT World Championships 1934 took place in Engelberg, Switzerland (Two-man) and in Garmisch-Partenkirchen, Germany (Four-man).

== Two man bobsleigh ==
Pos	Team	Time
Gold	Romania (Alexandru Frim, Vasile Dumitrescu)	
Silver	Germany (Hermann von Mumm, Fritz Schwarz)	
Bronze	Romania (Alexandru Papana, Dumitru Hubert)	

== Four man bobsleigh ==
Pos	Team	Time
Gold	Germany (Hanns Killian, Fritz Schwarz, Hermann von Valta, Sebastian Huber)	
Silver	Romania (Emil Angelescu, Teodor Popescu, Dumitru Gheorghiu, Ion Gribincea)	
Bronze	France (Jean de Suarez d'Aulan, Rheims, Bemish, Jacques Bridou)	

== Medal table ==
Rank	Nation	Gold	Silver	Bronze	Total
1	Romania (ROU)	1	1	1	3
2	Germany (GER)	1	1	0	2
3	France (FRA)	0	0	1	1
Totals (3 entries)		2	2	2	6
