= Carl Joseph Anton Mittermaier =

German jurist

Carl Mittermaier
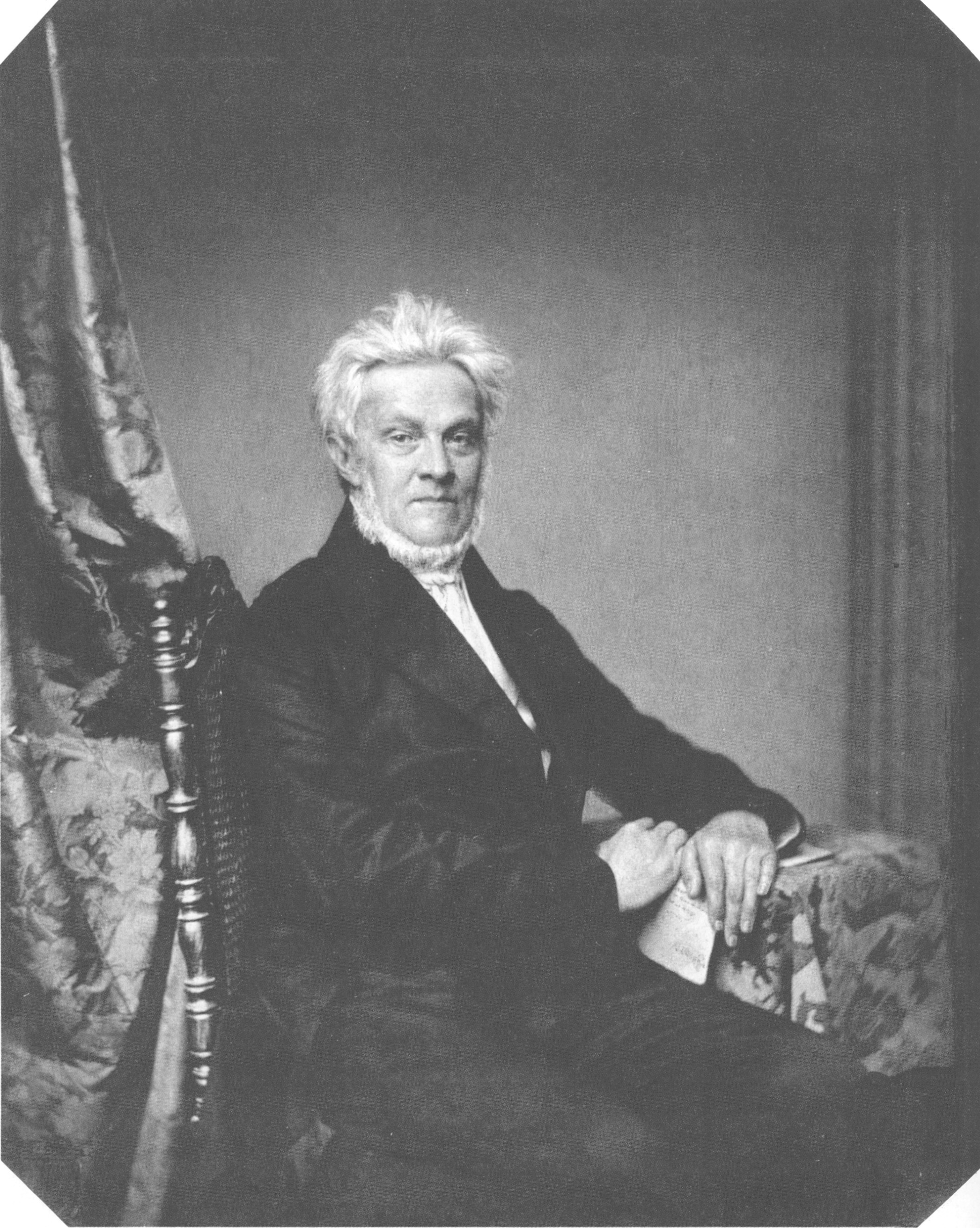

Carl Joseph Anton Mittermaier (5 August 1787, in Munich – 28 August 1867, in Heidelberg) was a German jurist. Historian Richard J. Evans has described him as the 'nineteenth century's most influential critic of the death penalty'.

== Biography ==
He was born in Munich, in the Electorate of Bavaria, and educated at the Ludwig-Maximilians-Universität in Landshut and Heidelberg University. For some years, he was professor at the Ludwig-Maximilians-Universität in Landshut, then professor at the University of Bonn for two years, from 1819 to 1821. For the rest of his life, he was professor of law and jurisprudence at Heidelberg University.

Mittermaier was a member of the Baden legislature for nearly 20 years previous to 1841, when his grief at the death of his son caused him to withdraw. During that time, he had been three times president of the legislature. When he resumed his seat in 1846, he was again president during the session of 1847 to 1848. In 1848, he was president of the Frankfurt Pre-Parliament (German: Vorparlament), serving afterwards as representative of the city of Baden in the Parliament, where he advocated confederation, but opposed all extreme measures.

Mittermaier was elected a member of the American Antiquarian Society in 1845, and a Foreign Honorary Member of the American Academy of Arts and Sciences in 1853.

== Work ==
His greatest claim to distinction lies in his extensive writings on jurisprudence, among which is a complete manual of criminal law, Das deutsche Strafverfahren, and he was an earnest advocate of reform in the German criminal procedure and in prison discipline. The number of his published writings is very large, including many treatises on branches of law, discussions on all the important questions of his time connected with jurisprudence, and especially on trial by jury and the penal code. Mittermaier used statistical evidence to claim that capital punishment was an ineffective deterrent, and influenced other German opponents of the death penalty such as Friedrich Noellner.

Among his works are:

- Handbuch des peinlichen Prozesses (2 vols., Heidelberg, 1810–12) His first work on criminal law, later republished, enlarged and modified, under the title of Das deutsche Strafverfahren.
- Lehrbuch des deutschen Privatrechts (Landshut, 1821) Subsequently, merged into his Grundsätze des gemeinen deutschen Privatrechts
- Theorie des Beweises im peinlichen Prozesse (2 vols., Darmstadt, 1821) Expounds principles relating to the examination of witnesses in criminal law.
- Der gemeine deutsche bürgerliche Prozess (1820–26) Contains a comprehensive exposition of the principles upon which civil trials should be conducted.
- Das deutsche Strafverfahren in der Fortbildung durch Gerichtsgebrauch und Particulargesetzgebung (2 vols., 1832) This passed through many editions.
- Lehrbuch des Criminalprozesses A manual of criminal law that passed through numerous editions.
- Die Lehre vom Beweise im deutschen Strafprozesse (1834; French translation, 1848; Spanish, 1851) Also expounds principles relating to the examination of witnesses in criminal law.
- Grundsätze des gemeinen deutschen Privatrechts, mit Einschluss des Handel-, Wechsel- und Seerechts (2 vols., Ratisbon, 1837–38)
- Italienische Zustände (Heidelberg, 1844) Embodies the result of his observations during frequent visits to Italy.
- Die Mündlichkeit, das Anklageprincip, die Oeffentlichkeit und das Geschworenengericht (Stuttgart, 1845) This brings the investigation and the enactments relating to trial by jury down to the period of its publication.
- Das deutsche Strafverfahren in der Fortbildung durch Gerichtsgebrauch und Landesgesetzbücher (Heidelberg, 1845–46) A complete manual of criminal law, considered his greatest work by some.
- Das englische, schottische und nordamerikanische Strafverfahren (Erlangen, 1851) Examines the administration of justice in England, Scotland, and the United States.
- Anleitung zur Vertheidigungskunst im Criminalprozesse (translated into Italian by Garba, 1858) Also expounds principles relating to the examination of witnesses in criminal law.
- Die Gefängnissverbesserung (Improving prisons, 1858)
- Der gegenwärtige Zustand der Gefängnissfrage (The current standing of the prison question, 1860)
- Die Todesstrafe &c. (The death penalty; Heidelberg, 1862)
- Erfahrungen über die Wirksamkeit der Schwurgerichte in Europa und Amerika (Experience with the utility of juries in Europe and America, 1865)

His principal works have been translated into many languages. He himself translated Francis Lieber's Letter on Anglican and Gallican Liberty into German, and edited the German translation of Lieber's Civil Liberty.
