= Ion Gribincea =

Romanian bobsledder

Medal record

Bobsleigh

Representing Romania

World Championships
Silver medal – second place	1934 Garmisch-Partenkirchen	Four-man

Ion Gribincea was a Romanian bobsledder who competed in the 1930s. He won a silver medal in the four-man event at the 1934 FIBT World Championships in Garmisch-Partenkirchen.
