= Edgardo Vaghi =

Italian bobsledder (1915–1986)

Edgardo Vaghi (30 June 1915 – 9 December 1986) was an Italian bobsledder who competed in the late 1930s. He later fought for Italy in the Aeronautica Nazionale Repubblicana during World War II over Greece and the Soviet Union. Prior to both careers, he competed in auto racing.

Vaghi was born in Milan in 1915, where he died in 1986, aged 71.

== Auto racing career ==
In 1935, Vaghi was Class II champion in the touring car event from Milan to San Remo.

== Bobsleigh career ==
Vaghi finished 11th in the two-man event at the 1936 Winter Olympics in Garmisch-Partenkirchen.

== Military career ==
As a Second Lieutenant (Sottotenete in Italian), Vaghi fought against the Royal Air Force in Greece in 1941 which damaged his fighter plane.
