= Emil Diener =

Swiss bobsledder

Medal record

Bobsleigh

World Championships
Gold medal – first place	1935 Igls	Two-man

Emil Diener was a Swiss bobsleigher who competed in the 1930s. He won a gold medal in the two-man event at the 1935 FIBT World Championships in Igls.
