= Robert Gindre =

French cross-country skier (1911–1991)

Personal information
- Full name: Robert Alix Gindre
- Nationality: French
- Born: 3 April 1911; Lamoura, France
- Died: 27 October 1991 (aged 80); Saint-Germain-en-Montagne, France

Sport
- Sport: Cross-country skiing

Robert Gindre (3 April 1911 – 27 October 1991) was a French cross-country skier. He competed in the men's 18 kilometre event at the 1936 Winter Olympics.
