= Ernest Yates =

British figure skater

Personal information
- Nationality: British
- Born: 18 January 1915
- Died: 19 March 1980 (aged 65); Castel, Guernsey, Channel Islands

Sport
- Sport: Figure skating

Ernest Yates (18 January 1915 – 19 March 1980) was a British figure skater. He competed in the pairs event at the 1936 Winter Olympics.
