= Willem Gevers =

Dutch nobleman, diplomat, and bobsledder

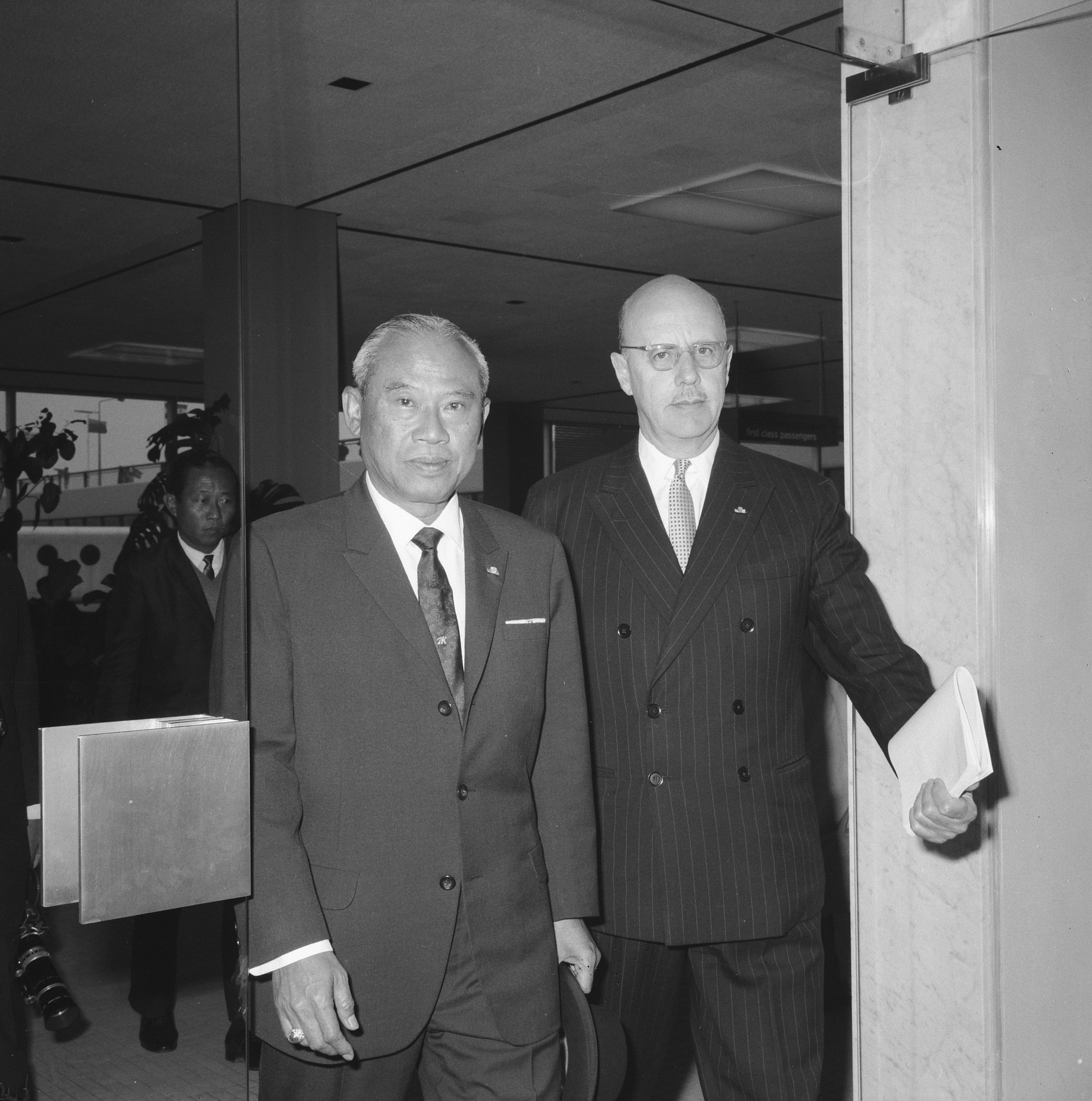
Thai PM Thanom Kittikachorn & Willem Gevers (1968)

Baron Willem Johan Gijsbert Gevers (11 January 1911 – 23 May 1994), lord of Kethel en Spaland, was a Dutch nobleman and diplomat who competed in the mid-1930s in bobsledding.

Gevers was born in Berlin, son of the Dutch Envoy to Germany Willem Alexander Frederik Gevers. At the 1936 Winter Olympics in Garmisch-Partenkirchen, he finished tenth in the two-man event. He later became Dutch Ambassador to the United Kingdom. He died, aged 83, in Monaco.
