= Hans Stürer =

Austrian bobsledder

Personal information
- Full name: Johann Michael Roland Stürer
- Nationality: Austrian
- Born: 28 January 1900; Innsbruck, Austria-Hungary
- Died: 12 January 1968 (aged 67); Innsbruck, Austria

Sport
- Sport: Bobsleigh

Hans Stürer (28 January 1900 – 12 January 1968) was an Austrian bobsledder who competed in the mid-1930s. He finished 13th in the two-man event at the 1936 Winter Olympics in Garmisch-Partenkirchen.
