= Franz Wohlgemuth =

Austrian bobsledder

Personal information
- Full name: Franz Anton Maria Wohlgemuth
- Nationality: Austrian
- Born: 8 February 1899 Telfs, Austria-Hungary
- Died: 27 July 1969 (aged 70) Zirl, Austria

Sport
- Sport: Bobsleigh

Franz Wohlgemuth (8 February 1899 – 27 July 1969) was an Austrian bobsledder who competed from the late 1920s to the mid-1930s. Competing in two Winter Olympics, he earned his best finish of 11th in the four-man event at Garmisch-Partenkirchen in 1936.
