= Albert Mugnier =

French bobsledder

Personal information
- Full name: Albert Auguste Mugnier
- Nationality: French
- Born: 11 March 1903; Annecy, France
- Died: 10 December 1974 (aged 71); Chamonix-Mont-Blanc, France

Sport
- Sport: Bobsleigh

Albert Mugnier (March 11, 1903, in Annecy – December 10, 1974, in Chamonix) was a French bobsledder who competed in the mid-1930s. At the 1936 Winter Olympics in Garmisch-Partenkirchen he competed in the four-man event, but failed to finish the first run.
