= Fritz Vonhof =

German bobsledder

Fritz Vonhof (born February 16, 1907, date of death unknown) was a German bobsledder who competed in the mid-1930s. At the 1936 Winter Olympics in Garmisch-Partenkirchen he competed in the four-man event, but crashed in the first run.
