= Robert Bednar =

Austrian bobsledder

Personal information
- Nationality: Austrian
- Born: 11 July 1911; Semmering, Austria-Hungary
- Died: 24 July 1993 (aged 82); Breitenstein, Austria

Sport
- Sport: Bobsleigh

Robert Bednar (11 July 1911 – 24 July 1993) was an Austrian bobsledder who competed in the mid-1930s. He finished 13th and last in completing the four runs in the four-man event at the 1936 Winter Olympics in Garmisch-Partenkirchen.

He is the younger brother of fellow bobsledder Franz Bednar.
