= Étienne Payot =

French bobsledder

Personal information
- Full name: Étienne Marcel Payot
- Nationality: French
- Born: 21 July 1900 Chamonix-Mont-Blanc, France
- Died: 18 July 1972 (aged 71) Chamonix-Mont-Blanc, France

Sport
- Sport: Bobsleigh

Étienne Payot (pronounced [etjɛn pajo]; July 27, 1900 – July 18, 1972) was a French bobsledder who competed in the mid-1930s. At the 1936 Winter Olympics in Garmisch-Partenkirchen he competed in the four-man event, but failed to finish the first run.
