= Hans Volckmar =

Austrian bobsledder

Personal information
- Full name: Johann Adolf Volckmar
- Nationality: Austrian
- Born: 6 October 1900; Graz, Austria
- Died: 25 February 1969 (aged 68); Graz, Austria

Sport
- Sport: Bobsleigh

Hans Volckmar (6 October 1900 − 25 February 1969) was an Austrian bobsledder who competed in the mid-1930s. He finished 19th in the two-man event at the 1936 Winter Olympics in Garmisch-Partenkirchen.
