= Jean Dauven =

French bobsledder

Personal information
- Full name: Jean Antoine Dauven
- Nationality: French
- Born: 3 November 1900 Charleville-Mezieres, France
- Died: 14 July 1990 (aged 89) Neuilly-sur-Seine, France

Sport
- Sport: Bobsleigh

Jean Dauven (3 November 1900 – 14 July 1990) was a French bobsledder who competed in the 1930s. He finished ninth in the four-man event at the 1936 Winter Olympics in Garmisch-Partenkirchen. Dauven later became a sports journalist in the French newspaper Le Figaro. Despite he worked in a conservative newspaper, he argued for the progressive policy of the Front populaire and Léo Lagrange. He also was a writer about bobsleigh, writing a book Bolides des glace (bobsleigh) in 1944.
