= Dumitru Gheorghiu =

Romanian bobsledder

Medal record

Bobsleigh

Representing Romania

World Championships
Silver medal – second place	1934 Garmisch-Partenkirchen	Four-man

Dumitru Gheorghiu (14 December 1904 – 19 January 1976) was a Romanian bobsledder who competed in the 1930s. He won a silver medal in the four-man event at the 1934 FIBT World Championships in Garmisch-Partenkirchen, Germany.

At the 1936 Winter Olympics in Garmisch-Partenkirchen, Gheorgiu finished 16th in the two-man event and did not finish in the four-man event.
