= Henri Koch (bobsledder) =

Luxembourgish bobsledder

Henri Koch (14 October 1904 - 11 May 1954) was a Luxembourgish bobsledder who competed in the 1930s. He competed in the two-man event at the 1936 Winter Olympics, but crashed out during the fourth run and did not finish.
