= Hans Aichele =

Swiss bobsledder (1911–1946)

Personal information
- Born: 2 November 1911 Baden, Switzerland
- Died: September 1946 (aged 34) Baden, Switzerland
Medal record
Bobsleigh
Representing Switzerland
Olympic Games
Silver medal – second place	1936 Garmisch-Partenkirchen	Four-man
World Championships
Bronze medal – third place	1937 Cortina d'Ampezzo	Two-man

Hans Aichele (2 November 1911 – September 1946) was a Swiss bobsledder who competed in the late 1930s. He won a silver medal in the four-man event at the 1936 Winter Olympics in Garmisch-Partenkirchen. Aichele also won a bronze medal in the two-man event at the 1937 FIBT World Championships in Cortina d'Ampezzo.
