= Richard Lawrence (bobsleigh) =

American bobsledder (1906–1974)

Personal information
- Full name: Richard Webster Lawrence
- Nationality: American
- Born: 22 July 1906 West Chazy, New York, US
- Died: June 1974 (aged 67) Rochester, New York, US

Sport
- Sport: Bobsleigh
Medal record
Bobsleigh
Representing United States
Olympic Games
Bronze medal – third place	1936 Garmisch-Partenkirchen	Two-man

Richard Webster Lawrence (July 22, 1906 – June 1974) was an American bobsledder who competed in the 1930s. He won the bronze medal in the two-man event at the 1936 Winter Olympics in Garmisch-Partenkirchen and finished sixth in the four-man event at those same games.
