= Ivan Brown (bobsleigh) =

American bobsledder

Personal information
- Full name: Ivan Elmore Brown
- Nationality: American
- Born: April 17, 1908 Keene, New York, USA
- Died: May 22, 1963 (aged 55) Hartford, Connecticut, USA
Medal record
Men's bobsleigh
Representing the United States
| Gold medal – first place | 1936 Garmisch-Partehkirchen | Two-man |

Ivan Elmore Brown (April 17, 1908 – May 22, 1963) was an American bobsledder who competed in the 1930s. He won the gold medal in the two-man event at the 1936 Winter Olympics in Garmisch-Partenkirchen.
