= Franz Bednar =

Austrian bobsledder

Personal information
- Nationality: Austrian
- Born: 31 March 1910; Semmering, Austria-Hungary
- Died: 9 May 1987 (aged 77); Homburg, West Germany

Sport
- Sport: Bobsleigh

Franz Bednar (31 March 1910 – 9 May 1987) was an Austrian bobsledder who competed in the mid-1930s. He finished 13th and last in completing the four runs in the four-man event at the 1936 Winter Olympics in Garmisch-Partenkirchen.

He is the older brother of fellow bobsledder Robert Bednar.
