= Jean de Suarez d'Aulan =

French aristocrat (1900–1944)

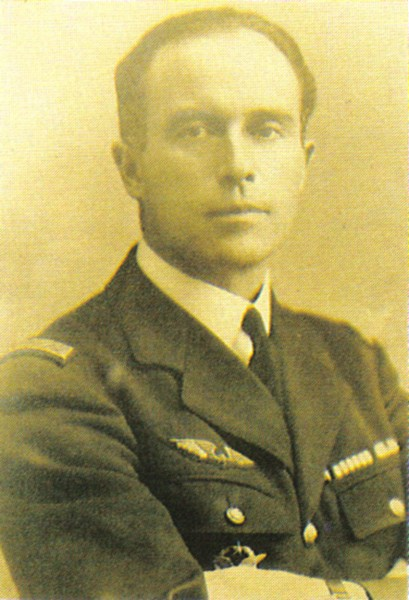

Personal information
- Full name: Marie Quenin Félix Ghislain Foulques Jean de la Croix Harouard de Suarez d’Aulan
- Nationality: French
- Born: 20 November 1900 Savasse, France
- Died: 8 October 1944 (aged 43) Altkirch, France

Sport
- Sport: Bobsleigh, Motorsport
Medal record
Bobsleigh
World Championships
Bronze medal – third place	1934 Garmisch-Partenkirchen	Four-man

Jean de Suarez d'Aulan (20 November 1900 – 8 October 1944) was a French aristocrat, aviator, auto racer, bobsledder, businessman and soldier.

== Background ==
Jean de Suarez d'Aulan was the son of Marquis François de Suarez d'Aulan (1864–1910) and his wife Madeleine de Geoffre de Chabrignac. Jean inherited a substantial sum of money, estimated to be near 500 million Fr, which made him one of the wealthiest aristocrats in Europe. The ‘Suarez’ name originates from the Spanish aristocracy, which held the principle title Duke of Feria among other Spanish titles, while the ‘Aulan’ part of the name originates from the French family seat of the name which is attached to the titles of Marquis and Count. Moran Suarez, from which the Suarez d'Aulan are directly descended, was one of forty knights who captured the city of Xores (Jerez de la Frontera), on the Moors, in 1266. Jean d'Aulan was also the grandson of Marquis Arthur de Suarez d'Aulan, whose second wife was the American heiress Norma Christmas, of Natchez, Mississippi.

== Sports career ==
=== Bobsleigh ===
As a bobsledder, d'Aulan won a bronze medal in the four-man event at the 1934 FIBT World Championships in Garmisch-Partenkirchen. Competing in four Winter Olympics, his best finish was fourth in the four-man event at the 1924 Winter Olympics in Chamonix.

=== Auto racing ===
D'Aulan drove an EHP in the 1925 24 Hours of Le Mans race with René Dely, finishing 14th.

=== Aviation ===
As an aviator, d'Aulan won rally events in Egypt in 1937 and in France in 1938.

== Military career ==
During World War I, d'Aulan fought in the 5th Battalion in the infantry, enlisting in 1918.

After France fell in 1940, d'Aulan joined the Free French Forces and was assigned to the Royal Air Force as a fighter pilot as a second lieutenant. D'Aulan flew various fighter aircraft, including the Supermarine Spitfire, and participated in several air operations over Europe. On 8 October 1944, while flying his Republic P-47 Thunderbolt on a mission over Germany, he was shot down by a Messerschmitt Bf 109 and killed. He was posthumously awarded the Croix de Guerre and the Légion d'honneur, among other military honors.

D'Aulan's death was a significant loss to the French Resistance and the Free French Forces, and he was mourned by many in France and beyond. In his memory, several streets and public places in France have been named after him.

Despite his short life, Jean d'Aulan was actively engaged in sports, aviation, and military service.

== Personal life ==
Jean de Suarez d'Aulan married in 1926 Anne Marie Yolande Kunkelmann (1904–1989), daughter of the founder of Piper-Heidsieck Champagne. Together, they had four children: Francois (10th Marquis of Aulan), Catherine (married to Claude Taittinger), Guilaine (married to Count de Poix) and Philippe.

During the summer, the Marquesses d'Aulan resided at their ancestral estate, the Château d'Aulan, located in the Department of Drôme in the southern region of France. In the winter season, they occupied their town residence in the fashionable precincts of Paris.

His widow Yolande de Suarez d'Aulan married in 1946 General Guy d'Alès de Corbet (1895–1972).
