= Hans Rottensteiner =

Austrian bobsledder

Personal information
- Full name: Johann Rottensteiner
- Nationality: Austrian
- Born: 1 June 1901; Kundl, Austria-Hungary
- Died: 28 April 1957 (aged 55); Innsbruck, Austria

Sport
- Sport: Bobsleigh

Hans Rottensteiner (1 June 1901 – 28 April 1957) was an Austrian bobsledder who competed in the mid-1930s. He finished 13th in the two-man event at the 1936 Winter Olympics in Garmisch-Partenkirchen.
