= Anatole Bozon =

French bobsledder

Personal information
- Full name: Joannes Anatole Bozon
- Nationality: French
- Born: 30 November 1899; Chamonix, France
- Died: 24 February 1939 (aged 39); Val-d'Isère, France

Sport
- Sport: Bobsleigh

Anatole Bozon (29 November 1899 in Chamonix – 24 February 1939) was a French bobsledder who competed in the mid-1930s. He finished 21st in the two-man event at the 1936 Winter Olympics in Garmisch-Partenkirchen.

He died on 24 February 1939 in an avalanche near the Col de l'Iseran while leading two skiers on an excursion.
