= Pierre Musy =

Swiss bobsledder (1910–1990)

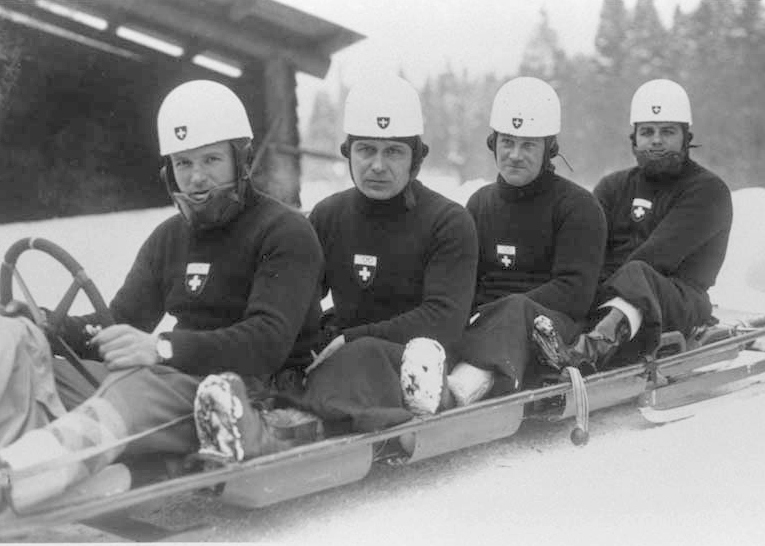
- Musy (left) at the 1936 Olympics

Personal information
- Born: 25 August 1910 Albeuve, Switzerland
- Died: 21 November 1990 (aged 80) Düdingen, Switzerland
- Education: University of Bern
Medal record
Bobsleigh
Representing Switzerland
Olympic Games
Gold medal – first place	1936 Garmisch-Partenkirchen	Four-man
World Championships
Silver medal – second place	1935 St. Moritz	Four-man

Pierre Musy (25 August 1910 – 21 November 1990) was a Swiss bobsledder and horse rider. Competing in the four-man bobsled event he won a gold medal at the 1936 Winter Olympics and a silver at the FIBT World Championships 1935. As an equestrian he competed in the three-day eventing at the 1948 Summer Olympics and finished 32nd individually and fourth with the Swiss team.

Musy was the son of Jean-Marie Musy, who was the President of the Swiss Confederation in 1925 and in 1930. He graduated from Collège Saint-Michel and from the University of Bern with a degree in law. From 1931 to 1939 he worked at local and federal banks in Geneva. He took various military posts from 1938 through 1960s, and served as a Swiss military attaché in the Middle East (1951–1954) and European countries (1954–1961). Between 1963 and 1967 he headed the Swiss Military Intelligence Service, and after that was appointed as President of FC Fribourg.
