= Joseph Beerli =

Swiss bobsledder (1901–1967)

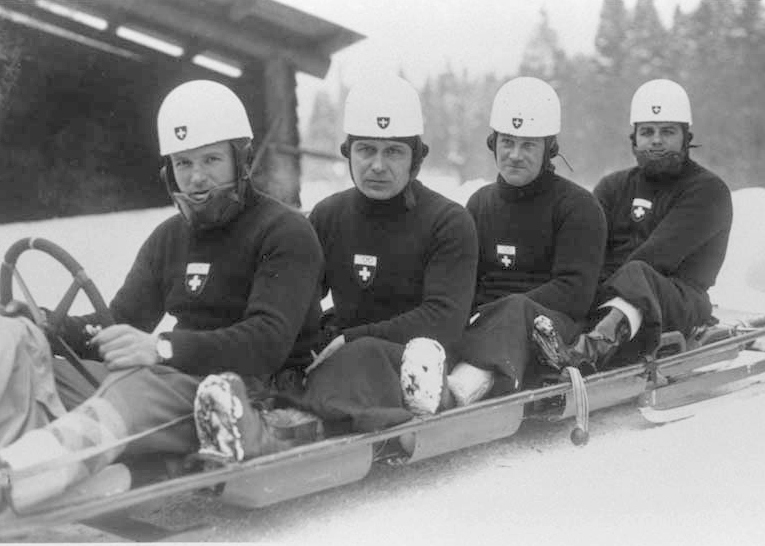
- Beerli (2nd right) at the 1936 Olympics

Personal information
- Born: 22 December 1901
- Died: 4 September 1967 (aged 65) Stans, Switzerland
Medal record
Bobsleigh
Representing Switzerland
Olympic Games
Gold medal – first place	1936 Garmisch-Partenkirchen	Four-man
Silver medal – second place	1936 Garmisch-Partenkirchen	Two-man
World Championships
Silver medal – second place	1935 St. Moritz	Four-man
Bronze medal – third place	1938 St. Moritz	Two-man
Gold medal – first place	1939 Cortina d'Ampezzo	Four-man
Gold medal – first place	1947 St. Moritz	Four-man

Joseph Beerli (22 December 1901 – 4 September 1967) was a Swiss bobsledder who competed from the mid-1930s to the late 1940s. At the 1936 Winter Olympics in Garmisch-Partenkirchen, he won a gold medal in the four-man and a silver in the two-man events.

Beerli also won three medals at the FIBT World Championships with one gold (four-man: 1939), one silver (four-man: 1935) and one bronze (two-man: 1938). He retired after the 1947 World Championships and until his death in 1967 ran his sports shop.
