= Reto Capadrutt =

Swiss bobsledder (1912–1939)

Personal information
- Born: 4 March 1912 Chur, Switzerland
- Died: 3 February 1939 (aged 26) St. Moritz, Switzerland
Medal record
Bobsleigh
Representing Switzerland
Olympic Games
Silver medal – second place	1932 Lake Placid	Two-man
Silver medal – second place	1936 Garmisch-Partenkirchen	Four-man
World Championships
Gold medal – first place	1935 Igls	Two-man
Bronze medal – third place	1935 St. Moritz	Four-man
Bronze medal – third place	1937 Cortina d'Ampezzo	Two-man

Reto Capadrutt (4 March 1912 – 3 February 1939) was a Swiss bobsledder who competed in the 1930s. Competing in two Winter Olympics, he won a silver medal in the two-man event in 1932 and another silver medal in the four-man event in 1936.

Capadrutt also won three medals at the FIBT World Championships, with one gold (Two-man: 1935) and two bronzes (Two-man: 1937, Four-man: 1935).

At the time of the 1932 Winter Olympics, he was linked to a romantic relationship with Elizabeth "Betty" Hood, daughter of John Ahearn. Ahearn was involved in New York City's Tammany Hall politics during the 1920s and 1930s.

While competing in the 1939 Boblet Grand Prix at St. Moritz, Capadrutt went off course, crashed into a tree, and died from his injuries.
