= Negroponte family =

Genoese-Byzantine noble House

Negroponte Νεγροπόντε
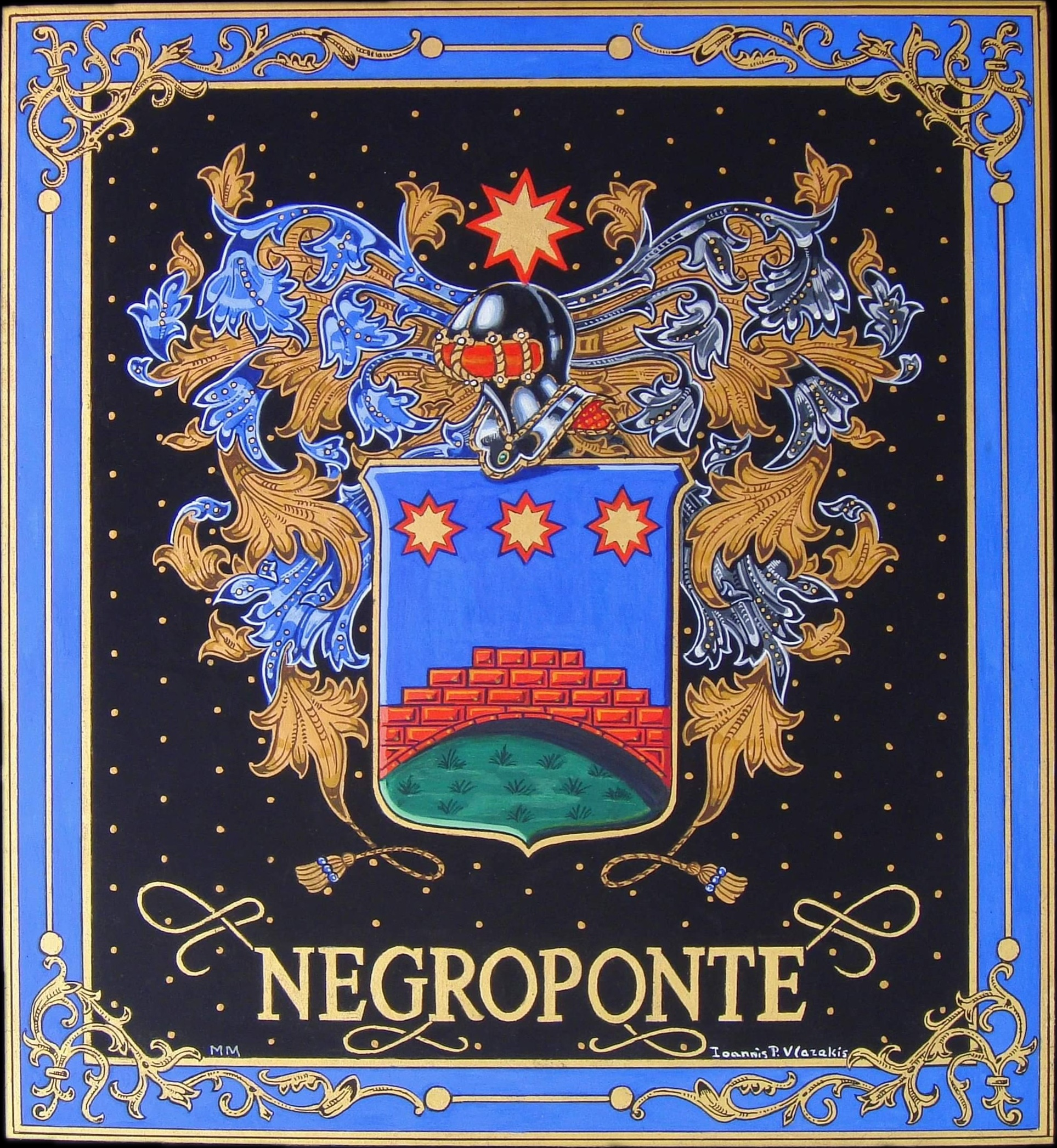
- Heraldic Achievement of the House of Negroponte
- Parent family: Cattaneo family Zaccaria family
- Country: Lordship of Phocaea; Byzantine Empire; Triarchy of Negroponte; Republic of Genoa; Ottoman Empire; Greece
- Current region: Greece, United Kingdom, France, United States
- Founded: Early 14th century
- Founder: Domenico Cattaneo
- Titles: Lord of Negroponte; Lord of Phocaea; Lord of Lesbos
- Traditions: Roman Catholicism; Eastern Orthodoxy

The Negroponte or Negropontis family (Greek: Νεγροπόντε or Νεγρεπόντης, pl. Νεγροπόντηδες or Νεγρεπόντηδες) is a noble family of Genoese origin. They are descended from the noble House of Cattaneo-Zaccaria, who, for a period, governed the island of Negroponte along with other territories such as Lesbos, Phocaea. The family's establishment in Chios dates back to the first Genoese occupation.

== History of the Family Name ==
The origins of the Negroponte family can be traced back to the union of Andriolo Cattaneo "Paleologo" and Eliana Zaccaria through their only child, Domenico Cattaneo, who founded the Cattaneo-Zaccaria branch. Through Eliana's mother, Palaiologina, Domenico was a great-grandson of Andronikos Doukas Komnenos Palaiologos and a nephew to Emperor Michael VIII Palaiologos.

Domenico was known as "Zaccaria Cattaneo, Duke of Negroponte." Over time, the title was adopted by Domenico's descendants as a nickname, "di Negroponte." This nickname eventually evolved into a surname, establishing the Negroponte family name.

Despite the original surnames of Zaccaria and Cattaneo being gradually lost through numerous marriages into prominent Giustiniani houses— particularly the Bassano-Giustiniani and Pascari families— the Negroponte name was retained.

=== Subsequent Branches ===
As a result, in Chios, the Negroponte family developed two branches: the Pachyà (Passia-Bassano) and the Pascari.

== Family Fiefs ==
=== Andriolo's Tenure ===
Andriolo Cattaneo was initially appointed governor of Phocaea by Nicolino Zaccaria. Upon Nicolino's death, Andriolo succeeded him as Lord of Phocaea.

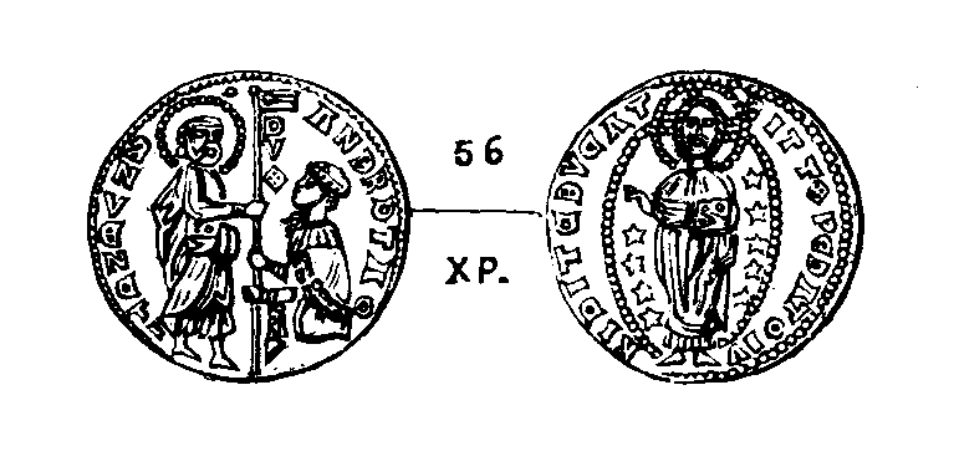
Gold Ducats of Andriolo Cattaneo

When the Byzantine Emperor Andronikos III sought to reassert control, Andriolo, being absent, left his uncle, Arrigo Tartaro, in charge. Arrigo managed to avoid annexation by paying homage to the emperor, who then renewed Andriolo’s tenure.

=== Domenico's Tenure ===
==== Capture of Lesbos ====
Andriolo's son, Domenico coveted the island of Lesbos and, seizing an opportunity in 1333, captured its capital, Mytiline with the help of Genoese galleys claiming the title of Lord of Lesbos for himself.

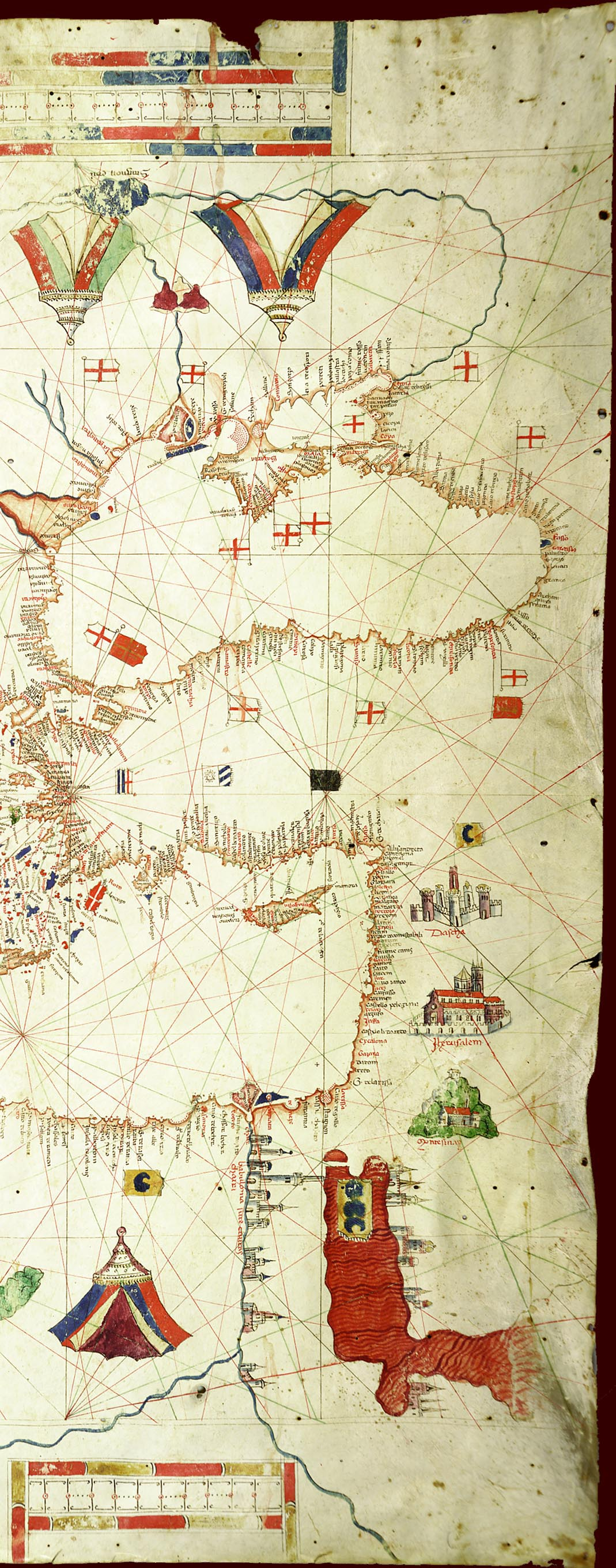
Foglia Vecchia and Foglia Nuova (Phocaea) appear on historical portolan charts as a Genoese Possession under the Cattaneo pattern (white and blue)

Initially, Domenico had allied with the Knights of St. John and Nicholas I Sanudo of Naxos for a coalition against the Turks. However, he outmanoeuvred these allies to secure sole control over the island instead. He then transferred his residence from Phocaea to the newly taken island.

==== Siege of Lesbos and Phocaea ====
Andronikos III reacted to the loss of Lesbos by punishing the Genoese inhabitants of Pera in Constantinople. He then embarked on a campaign to lay siege to Lesbos and Phocaea, securing assistance from the Turks for the latter endeavour. The Turks were motivated wanting to recover hostages previously taken by the Genoese including Saru-Khan's son.

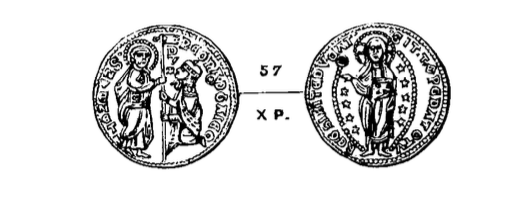
Gold Ducats of Domenico Cattaneo

Both sieges were prolonged until Cattaneo's lieutenant in charge in Phocaea reached a compromise for the siege to be lifted in exchange for the return of the hostages and surrender of Mytilene. Cattaneo reneged on this agreement and Mytilene was retaken only after his Latin mercenaries were bribed in 1336.

==== Loss of Lesbos and return to Phocaea ====
Cattaneo was allowed by Andronikos III to return to Phocaea and remain Lord according to the old terms of his tenure. Four years later, while Domenico was away on a hunting trip, the Greek inhabitants of Phocaea revolted and overpowered the Genoese garrison ending the first Genoese occupation in 1340.

==== Local Currency ====
Two gold coins, modeled after Venetian ducats, have survived depicting Andriolo and Domenico Cattaneo and attesting to the wealth of these lands under their governance. The first of these coins is the earliest known counterfeit.

== Presence in Euboea ==
Members of the Negroponte family have been documented in Venetian sources as holding various positions during the 14th century. Notably, Stamatis di Negroponte was appointed Commander of Modon in 1385. Additionally, Marc Andrea Negroponte was granted the title of Count in Venice on March 30, 1573 and Knight of the Sacred Military Constantinian Order of Saint George, titles that extended to all his descendants, regardless of gender.

== Presence in Chios ==
=== Pre-19th century ===
While the presence of the Zaccaria-Cattaneo family in Chios has been documented since the 14th century, the Negroponte name did not appear in official records until the early 17th century, marking the completion of its transition from nickname to a surname.

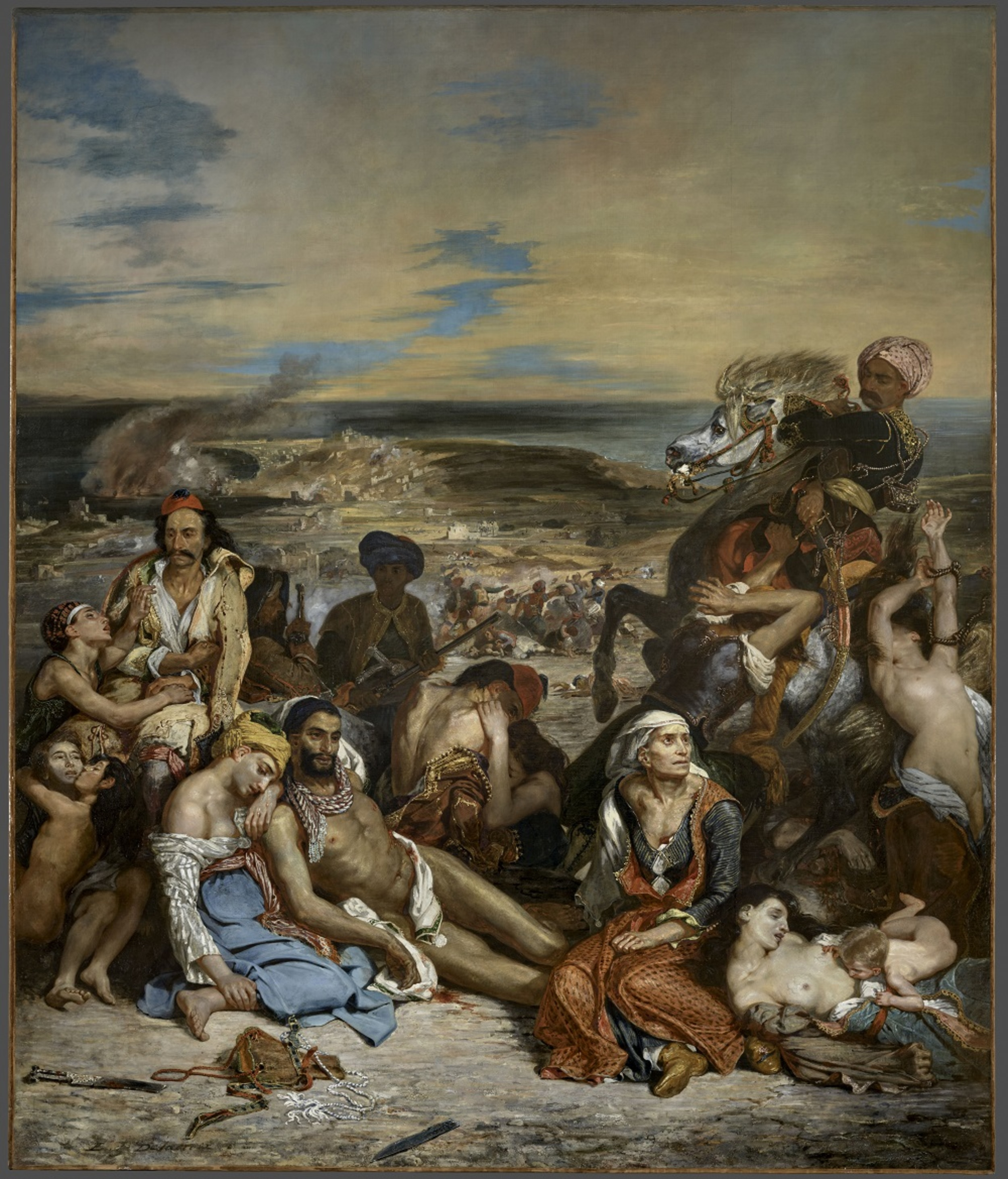
The Massacre at Chios by Eugène Delacroix. This, and the works of Lord Byron, did much to draw the attention of mainland Europe to the catastrophe that had taken place in Chios (1824, oil on canvas, 419 cm × 354 cm (165 in × 139 in), Musée du Louvre, Paris).

The lack of earlier documentation of individuals solely bearing the Negroponte name could also be explained by the destruction of many ecclesiastical documents during the massacre of Chios by the Ottoman Empire in 1822 as noted by Argentis.

Consequently, the earliest recorded instances of such individuals date back to 1601, when various members were mentioned in the codex of the Latin bishopric and the Greek codices of Nea Moni in Chios.

In 1634, Ambrose Negroponte is noted in the codex as the owner of the church of Panaghia of Campos, also known as Panaghia Pachyà, which still stands in Chios.

=== Post 19th-century exodus from Chios ===
During the 1822 massacre of Chios, members of the Negroponte family, like other noble houses of the island, faced persecution. Some were executed, while others managed to flee.

Some moved to Syros, where they settled permanently and prospered, quickly regaining their prominence.

Other members established themselves in Constantinople, Athens and England.

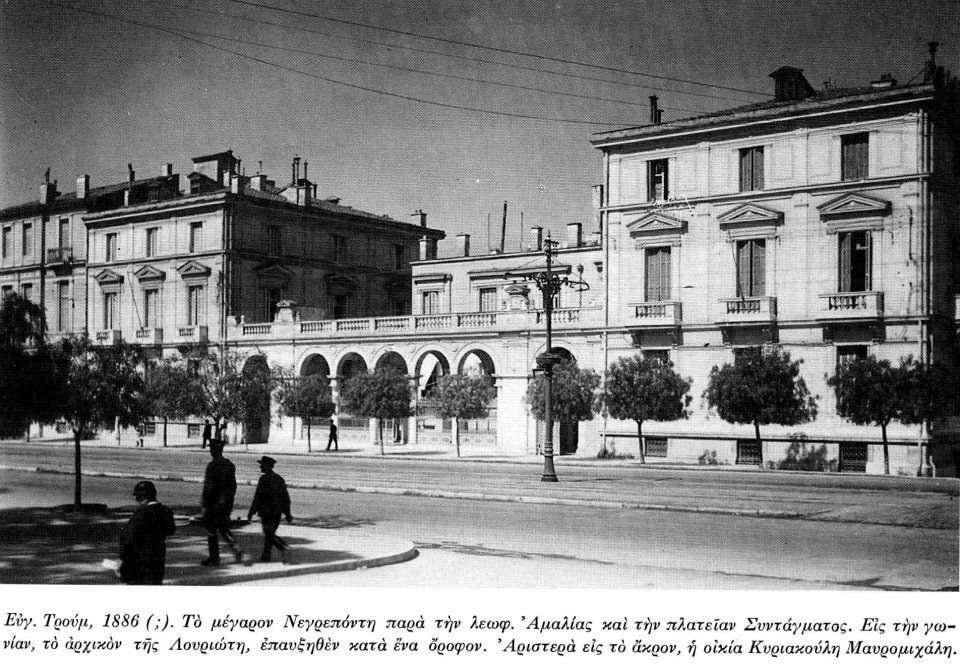
Negroponte Mansion in Athens

In Athens, Μιλτιάδης Νεγρεπόντης became an influential figure in politics, finance and sports, serving as director of the Bank of Greece, Minister of Finance and member of the Greek Committee of the Olympic Games. Miltiadis also acquired the "Negroponte Mansion" which temporarily housed Constantine I of Greece and Sophia of Prussia while the New Royal Palace was being built.

Family members that moved from Constantinople to Romania and Russia soon regained their fortunes and became large landowners with George Ulise Negropontes constructing the "Negroponte Palace" in Mărășești, where a fierce battle took place during WW1.

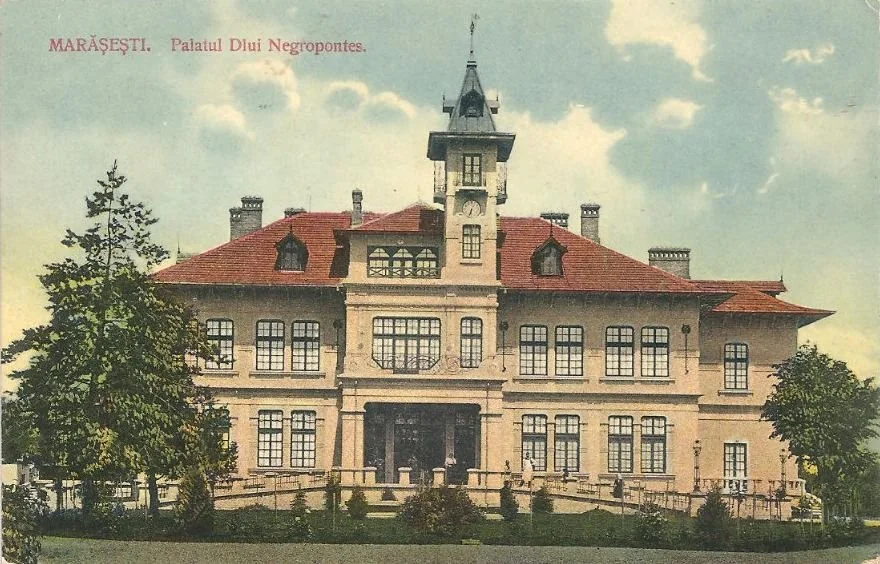
Negroponte palace în Mărăşeşti designed by Italian architect Giovanni Culluri

Those who settled in Egypt, England, and France also quickly attained prominent positions. In England, Dimitrios Negrepontis became a notable shipping magnate and the first-ever Greek to participate in the Winter Olympics as an alpine skier. In France, Michel Negroponte married Jeanne Hugo, granddaughter and heiress of Victor Hugo.

Through marriages with most of the prominent noble families of Chios, various branches of the Negroponte were established, and they continue to exist to this day.

== Connection with the Zaccaria-Damala ==
The Damalas is a Genoese-Byzantine noble house descended from the Zaccaria and also established in Chios. This branch adopted the name Damalas from the Barony of Damala held by Martino Zaccaria and his descendants, gradually replacing Zaccaria as their surname similarly to the Negroponte transition.

The Negroponte family is connected to the Zaccaria-Damalà through Eliana Zaccaria, the mother of Domenico Cattaneo- founder of the Negroponte branch.

Eliana was the daughter of Benedetto I Zaccaria and an unnamed Palaiologina, making her the sister of Palaiologo Zaccaria. Palaiologo was the father of Martino Zaccaria- founder of the Zaccaria-Damalà branch.

== The Negroponte Affair ==
In 1877, a correspondence between Menelaus Zannis Negroponte and William Ewart Gladstone, the Prime Minister of the United Kingdom, sparked considerable controversy. The letter from Gladstone was alleged to have called for Greeks to unite with Slavs in an attack on the Turks during the Russo-Turkish War (1877-1878). This allegation was reported by multiple newspapers including The Times, The Daily Telegraph and the Pall Mall Gazette. Both Negroponte and Gladstone denied that any such incitement was made in their correspondence, with Gladstone accusing third parties of orchestrating the affair. Following the incident, the Foreign Office had to issue correspondence affirming its respect for the affairs of Turkey.

== Notable Personalities ==
=== Medieval Members ===
- Domenico Cattaneo: Founder of the Negroponte branch, known as Cattaneo-Zaccaria, Duke of Negroponte. Was the Lord of Phocaea and Lord of Lesbos.
- Andriolo Cattaneo "Paleologo": father of Domenico Cattaneo. Lord of Phocaea.
- Eliana Zaccaria: mother of Domenico Cattaneo.
- Stamatis di Negroponte: commander of Modon.
- Marc Andrea Negroponte: granted the title of Count in Venice on March 30, 1573 and Knight of the Sacred Military Constantinian Order of Saint George.

=== Modern Members ===
- Miltiadis Negrepontis: deputy and Minister of Finance in Venizelos's ministry in 1919-1920.
- Eleni Ourani: known under the pseudonym “Alkis Thrylos” was a Greek writer, theatrical producer, actor, scenewriter, theatre teacher and director. She was a critic of literature of the theatre. Her husband was the poet Kostas Ouranis.
- Lt. General Iakovos Negrepontis: Had a distinguished military career and was the head of the military household of George II, King of Greece.
- Kostas Negrepontis: Greek footballer who played as a center forward in the 1920s and 1930s and a later manager.
- George Ulise Negropontes: landowner, industrialist and merchant of Greek origin, known for the support offered to the construction of the Mărășești Mausoleum.
- Michel Negroponte: Greek naval officer, married Jeanne Hugo, Belgian-born French heiress and socialite, and granddaughter of Victor Hugo.
- Dimitrios Negrepontis: shipping magnate and first-ever Greek to participate in the winter Olympics as an alpine skier, As a Greek Olympian, he carried the flag into the stadium in 1936. He did not salute Hitler.
- John Dimitri Negroponte: American Diplomat, first Director of National Intelligence.
- Nicholas Negroponte: Architect, founder and chairman Emeritus of Massachusetts Institute of Technology's Media Lab, and also founded the One Laptop per Child Association (OLPC). Negroponte is the author of the 1995 bestseller Being Digital translated into more than forty languages.
- Michel Negroponte: multiple award-winning American producer and director.
- Antonios Efthymiou: pilot and CEO of Hi Fly (airline). Headed the first repatriation flight from China during the COVID-19 pandemic bringing back approximately 350 European and other nationals. Organised and participated in the landing of the first Airbus A340 on Antarctic blue glacial ice after a flight from Cape Town, South Africa to Wolfs Fang Runway, Antarctica.

== Sources ==
- Argenti, Philip P. (1955). Libro d' Oro de la Noblesse de Chio. London Oxford University Press.
- Hopf, Carl (1888). Les Giustiniani, dynastes de Chios: étude historique. Ernest Leroux.
- Hopf, Carl (1873). Chroniques Gréco-Romanes Inédites ou peu Connues. Librairie de Weidmann.
- Pagano, Carlo (1846). Delle imprese e del dominio dei Genovesi nella Grecia. Tipografia die Fratelli Pagano.
- Sathas, Constantine N. (1829). Documents inedits relatifs a l'histoire de la Grece au Moyen Age. Maisonneuve et Cie Éditeurs.
- Ζολώτας, Γεώργιος Ιωάννου (1923). Ιστορία της Χίου. Sakellarios.
- Bartusis, Mark C. (1997). The Late Byzantine Army: Arms and Society, 1204–1453. Philadelphia, Pennsylvania: University of Pennsylvania Press. ISBN 0-8122-1620-2.
- Geanakoplos, Deno John (1959). Emperor Michael Palaeologus and the West, 1258–1282: A Study in Byzantine-Latin Relations. Cambridge, Massachusetts: Harvard University Press.
- Sturdza, Mihail Dimitri (1999). Dictionnaire Historique et Généalogique des Grandes Familles de Grèce, d'Albanie et de Constantinople.
- Miller, W. (1911). The Zaccaria of Phocaea and Chios. (1275-1329). The Journal of Hellenic Studies, 31. The Society for the Promotion of Hellenic Studies Press. doi:10.2307/624735. JSTOR 624735.
- Lampros, Paul (1880). Ανέκδοτα νομίσματα και μολυβδόβουλλα των κατά τους μέσους αιώνας Δυναστών της Ελλάδος. Εκ του Τυπογραφείου αδελφών Πέρρη.
