= Air2Web =

- Industry: software
- Founded: 1999
- Area served: Atlanta
- Products: AirCARE; CampaignPRO; Mobile Marketing; Mobile Assist; DirectTEXT; Enterprise Agent; Mobile Dev Suite
- Services: Wireless Application Service Provider
- Parent: Velti

The Air2Web company is an Atlanta-based Wireless Application Service Provider that was launched in 1999. They provided integrated wireless services, functioning as an intermediary between a company and its wireless carrier. Since 2011, Air2Web is owned by mobile marketing solutions provider Velti.

Their product Always Interactive accepted incoming data requests, then packaged up the request in XML and sent it to the corporate database. The result was returned in XML, which the Air2Web software provided as a graphical display or a voice message to the wireless device. Among the custom services that Air2Web provided is wireless package tracking for United Parcel Service.

In 2005, they acquired UK company Consult Mobile. Air2Web was acquired by Velti for $19M in 2011. Thomas Cotney, then CEO of Air2Web, executed the sale to Velti. Between 1999 and 2011 the company won multiple awards, including the 2007 Mobility Award for Best Enterprise Messaging Solution from consulting company Frost & Sullivan.

== Products ==
As of 2011 major products were (some or all services now integrated into Velti's offer):

- AirCARE – application suite for mobile communications.
- CampaignPRO – create and administer interactive sales campaigns for mobile marketing.
- Mobile Marketing – create personalized sales offers through mobile communications.
- Mobile Assist – interactive chat through mobile devices.
- DirectTEXT – message routing and delivery.
- Enterprise Agent – create customized programs to access data on mobile device.
- Mobile Dev Suite – develop applications for mobile devices.
