= Kyrou =

Surname

- Gender: Unisex
- Language: Greek

Kyrou is a surname of Greek origin, being most used in Greece (about 1,600 individuals, making it the 818th most common) and most dense in Cyprus (about 300 individuals, placing it in the 320th most common category). Notable people with this surname include:

- Adonis A. Kyrou (1923–1985), Greek filmmaker and writer
- Christian Kyrou (born 2003), Canadian ice hockey defenceman
- Emilios Kyrou (born 1959), Greek-Australian jurist
- Jordan Kyrou (born 1998), Canadian ice hockey player
- Kleitos Kyrou (1921–2006), Greek poet and translator
- Pavlos Kyrou (1860s–1904), Greek revolutionary
- Yiannis Kyrou (1942–1991), Greek scenic and costume designer
