= Praxitelis Tzanoulinos =

Greek sculptor and professor

- Born: 1955 (age 70–71); Falatados, Tinos, Greece
- Occupation: Sculptor
- Awards: Academy of Athens Sculpture Prize (1987)

Praxitelis Tzanoulinos (Greek: Πραξιτέλης Τζανουλίνος; b. 1955) is a Greek sculptor and professor.

== Biography ==
Born in 1955 in the village of Falatados, Tinos, Tzanoulinos studied sculpture at the Preparatory and Professional School of Fine Arts of Panormos Tinos (now Higher School of Fine Arts and Marble Craftsmanship). After finishing Tinos’ school he entered the Athens School of Fine Arts, studying under the sculptor Yannis Pappas. In 1987, Tzanoulinos received the Academy of Athens Sculpture Prize, and since 1989, he has taught sculpture and sculpture conservation at the University of West Attica.

As an artist, he has participated in various exhibitions, while his works are held in museums, private collections, and public spaces. Many of his sculptures stand in public places, mainly in Greece. Some of these works include the statues of Konstantinos Karamanlis in Thessaloniki and Serres, the bust of Eleftherios Venizelos in Bucharest, a bronze busts’ series of Costis Bastias, Kostas Ouranis, and Pantelis Horn in the Park of Greek Writers in Athens, a sculpture dedicated to the Olympic Games located in Montreal, and a bronze statue of Constantine P. Cavafy on Dionysiou Areopagitou Street in Athens.

During the 2010s, Tzanoulinos contributed to the Municipality of Athens’ programme for the conservation and restoration of outdoor sculptures damaged by causes including Vandalisms, environmental factors, and weather conditions.

Tzanoulinos was married to Greek pianist Mema Irineou until the latter's death in 2021.
