= Krishna Subramanian =

- Born: Long Beach, California
- Education: University of California, Davis
- Known for: Tech Entrepreneur; Co-founder of Captiv8; Co-founder of BlueLithium; Co-founder of Mobclix; Former Chief Marketing Officer of Velti

Krishna Subramanian is a serial tech entrepreneur, angel investor and commentator on mobile advertising. He is best known for a being the CEO and Co-Founder of Captiv8 that was acquired by Publicis Groupe and a founding employee of BlueLithium, one of the largest online ad network acquired by Yahoo in 2007 for $300 million, and Co-Founder of Mobclix, a mobile ad exchange network acquired by Velti in 2010. Subramanian has also written for Forbes, The Huffington Post, Advertising Age and Mashable.

== Career ==
=== Burrp! ===
In 2003, Subramanian co-founded Burrp!, an internet recommendation and review portal for local businesses and landmarks that operated in a number of Indian cities. Burrp! was acquired by Network 18 in 2009.

=== BlueLithium ===
In January 2004, he became a founding employee of BlueLithium. BlueLithium was an online advertising network, which provided a platform that displayed highly targeted advertising impressions. BlueLithium was acquired by Yahoo! in 2007 for $300 million. At the time of its acquisition, BlueLithium was the fifth largest ad network in the US and the second largest in the UK.

=== Mobclix ===
In 2008, Subramanian co-founded Mobclix with Sunil Verma and Vishal Gurbuxani. Mobclix was a mobile ad exchange network, which was acquired by Velti in 2010. Subramanian became chief marketing officer of Velti in 2011.

Subramanian resigned from Velti in October 2013. He was reelected to Mobile Marketing Association’s board of directors the same month.

=== Captiv8 ===
In Jan 2015, Subramanian co-founded Captiv8 with Vishal Gurbuxani, Taz Patel, and Sunil Verma. Publicis Groupe acquired influencer platform Captiv8 on May 20th 2025. Founded in 2015, Captiv8 provides influencer marketing software and commerce tools. Its platform claims to cover 95% of creators with more than 5,000 followers across 120 countries, and processes more than 2.5 billion social posts each year.
