= Maggie Cogan =

- Born: 1943 (age 82–83); New York City, New York
- Known for: First female horse-and-carriage driver in Central Park subject of Jupiter's Wife

Maggie Cogan is a resident of New York City who was the first female coachman in Central Park, working for the Plaza Hotel. She appeared in a 1967 Universal newsreel with her horse and carriage, and in 1968, also appeared on the syndicated version of the quiz show What's My Line?, with contestants attempting to guess her occupation.

After leaving her career briefly in the 1960s, she resumed it in 1970, befriending Lisa Ryan, the daughter of actor Robert Ryan, who had also become a carriage driver. By this point, she had had 2 unsuccessful marriages and given birth to two sons, both of whom she gave up when her life began to unravel. In 1977, while living with Ryan, Cogan began to show signs of mental illness and she was eventually committed to a mental hospital by her parents.

Eventually, she became homeless when she left her career for good. Director Michel Negroponte discovered her living in Central Park and made the documentary film Jupiter's Wife about her.

== Early life and career ==
Cogan was raised in the village of New Hyde Park in Nassau County, New York. While attending high school, she was active in cheerleading and dance clubs. After graduating, she attended several colleges but never completed an undergraduate degree. At 19, she began a career with the Plaza Hotel, becoming the first ever female Central Park carriage driver. In 1968, when the city announced that horse-drawn carriages would have to carry meters like taxicabs, Cogan was quoted in the associated story in the New York Times, saying "Meters! It's ridiculous. In this country, they almost want to meter our minds. It'll be like Coney Island. Tawdry."

== Collapse ==
In the late 1960s, Cogan's life began to unravel. She had two failed marriages, one of which produced two children. After showing increasing signs of being unable to cope with her failed relationships, she left her two children with her parents and moved to Texas for four years. Upon returning to New York City, she was unable to reclaim her children.

Cogan began to exhibit signs of increasing mental instability in the 1970s, while living with Lisa Ryan. She developed an infatuation with Ryan's father (actor Robert Ryan) and began sending him odd gifts, such as voodoo dolls attached to love notes. In 1977, she developed an additional infatuation with serial killer David Berkowitz and in the same year was mugged on the street, with her attacker slashing her face. At an indeterminate time, she was raped, as she says to the camera during Jupiter’s Wife without providing details. According to Lisa Ryan, "For the rest of the summer [of 1977] she barricaded herself in her bedroom and wouldn't come out."

By the end of the summer of 1977, Ryan and Cogan were scheduled to move out of their shared apartment. Cogan's parents arrived, moved her out, and committed her to a mental hospital.

== Homelessness ==
After losing her job as a carriage driver, Cogan became homeless, living most of the next 15 years in Central Park. To help herself deal with reality, she concocted vivid stories about herself, claiming that she was, in fact, Robert Ryan's daughter. She also claimed to have Extra Sensory Perception. Her charm and wit helped her, however, make friends who helped feed and clothe her during this period. She also developed a deep love for animals, adopting several dogs and living with them.

== Jupiter's Wife, obtaining housing ==
In 1989, Michel Negroponte was attempting to make a documentary about his childhood in Central Park when he encountered Cogan and decided to make the film Jupiter's Wife about her, instead. He filmed Cogan throughout 1989 until the end of 1991, showing her with her dogs, with friends, moving around Central Park, attending a gymnastics class that was taught by one of her friends, etc.

By the end of the film, a small abandoned maintenance shack she had been living in with her dogs during the winter had been raided and demolished by police and sanitation workers. However, after being able to receive public assistance due to her mental condition, she was able to move into an apartment. The film won a special jury prize at the Sundance Film Festival.

== After October 1995 ==
In 1995, Cogan, with her pets, was evicted from her Long Island City apartment. She moved in with friend Sara Whalen, founder and operator of Pets Alive shelter in Wallkill, NY. The New York Times reported that the arrangement was short-lived as Cogan returned to Central Park five weeks later.
