= Digitalism =

Digitalism may refer to:

- Digitalism (band), a German electronic music group
- Digitalism (medicine), a medical condition caused by digitalis poisoning
- Digitalism, or digitality, the condition of living in a digital culture
