= Kleitos Kyrou =

Greek poet and Translator

Kleitos-Dimitrios Kyrou (Greek: Κλείτος-Δημήτριος Κύρου; 13 August 1921 – 10 April 2006) was a Greek poet and translator. He was born in Thessaloniki and he studied at Anatolia College. In 1939, he entered the Law School of the Aristotle University of Thessaloniki. He worked in banking between 1951 and 1983, and he was General Secretary of the National Theatre of Northern Greece between 1974 and 1976.

He made his first literary appearance in 1944, at the students' magazine Beginning, starting with translations of foreign, mainly English, poetry. His first published poem was Expectation (Προσμονή, published in the Thessaloniki magazine Student, issue no. 3, 5 May 1945). In 1949 he published his first book of poetry, titled Pursuit, Recollections from a doubtful era (Αναζήτηση, Αναμνήσεις μιας αμφίβολης εποχής). He collaborated with a plethora of magazines, like Beginning, Student, Free Letters, Diagonal, Our Century, Shell, New Course, Criticism and Parlour. His complete poetic works were published as In whole, 1943–1997 Harvest (Εν όλω, Συγκομιδή 1943–1997, Agra, 1997). In 1988 he was honoured with the Second State Award for Poetry, for his book The birds and the awakening (Τα πουλιά και η αφύπνιση), which he declined. In 1992, he was honoured by the Greek Society of Literary Translators for his translation of Christopher Marlowe's play Doctor Faustus and in 1994 he received the First State Award for Translation, for his translation of Percy Bysshe Shelley's tragedy The Cenci. In 2005, the Academy of Athens bestowed upon him the Kostas and Eleni Ourani Award, for the whole of his poetic oeuvre.

His poems have been translated in English, French, Italian, Spanish, Russian, Polish, Bulgarian and Arab.

He married Philio Angelidou in 1969. His children were Eleni (born 1970) and Giorgos (born 1971).

He died on 10 April 2006 in his own home.

== Bibliography ==
=== Poetry ===
- Pursuit, Recollections from a doubtful era (Αναζήτηση, Αναμνήσεις μιας αμφίβολης εποχής), Thessaloniki, Th. Graikopoulos, 1949
- On first person (Σε πρώτο πρόσωπο), Thessaloniki, 1957
- Night screams (Κραυγές της νύχτας), Thessaloniki, 1960
- Key numbers (Κλειδάριθμοι), Thessaloniki, E. Sfakianakis, 1963
- Apology (Απολογία), Thessaloniki, 1966 (second and supplemented edition, Thessaloniki, 1976)
- The constructions 1949–1974 (Οι κατασκευές 1949–1974), Athens, Kedros, 1980
- The birds and the awakening (Τα πουλιά και η αφύπνιση), Athens, Nepheli, 1987
- Parole season and other poems (Περίοδος χάριτος και άλλα ποιήματα), Thessaloniki, Cheirographa, 1992
- The earlier word (Ο πρωθύστερος λόγος), Thessaloniki, Aigeiros, 1996
- In whole, 1943–1997 Harvest (Εν όλω, Συγκομιδή 1943–1997, complete works), Athens, Agra, 1997

=== Prose ===
- Setbacks. Life memoir (Οπισθοδρομήσεις. Αναδρομή ζωής) 2001, autobiography

=== Translations ===
==== Poetry ====
- Modern English poets, Thessaloniki, 1945
- Ode to Salvador Dalí and Ode to Walt Whitman, by Federico García Lorca (translated with Manolis Anagnostakis), Thessaloniki, 1948
- Lament for Ignacio Sánchez Mejías, by Federico García Lorca, Thessaloniki, Poetic Art, 1950
- The Pot of Earth, by Archibald MacLeish, Thessaloniki, New Course, 1958
- Belt, by Guillaume Apollinaire, Thessaloniki, New Course, 1962
- Ash Wednesday, by T. S. Eliot, Thessaloniki, Diagonal, 1965
- Prose of the Trans-Siberian and of Little Jehanne of France, by Blaise Cendrars and Sonia Delaunay, Athens, Diphros, 1965
- Poems, by Guillaume Apollinaire (translated with Fani Kiskira and Tolis Kazantzis), Thessaloniki, Diagonal, 1967
- Ash Wednesday and Ariel Poems, by T. S. Eliot, Thessaloniki, 1971
- Poems, by W. H. Auden, Thessaloniki, 1971
- Poems, by Archibald MacLeish, 1973
- Foreign voices, Athens, Kedros, 1979
- Four Quartets, by T. S. Eliot, Thessaloniki, Diagonal, 1981
- Burnt Norton, by T. S. Eliot, Athens, Athens School of Fine Arts, 1988
- Ash Wednesday - Ariel Poems - Four Quartets, by T. S. Eliot, Athens, Roptron, 1988
- The Waste Land, by T. S. Eliot, Athens, Ypsilon, 1990

==== Theatre ====
- When Five Years Pass, by Federico García Lorca, 1962
- 'Tis Pity She's a Whore, by John Ford, Athens, Nepheli, 1986
- Doctor Faustus, by Christopher Marlowe, Athens, Agra, 1990
- The Cenci, by Percy Bysshe Shelley, Athens, Agra, 1993
