= Negroponte switch =

The Negroponte switch is an idea developed by Nicholas Negroponte in the 1980s, while at the Media Lab at MIT. He suggested that due to the accidents of engineering history we had ended up with static devices – such as televisions – receiving their content via signals travelling over the airways, while devices that could have been mobile and personal – such as telephones – were receiving their content over static cables.

== Idea ==
It was his idea that a better use of available communication resource would result if the information (such as telephone calls) going through the cables were to go through the air, and that going through the air (such as TV programmes) were to be delivered via cables. Negroponte called this process “trading places”.

At an event organized by Northern Telecom, his co-presenter George Gilder called it the “Negroponte Switch”, and that name stuck from then on. As mobile devices came about, connections were needed for the data network, and bandwidths were required and deliverable in wired or fibre-optic systems growth. It became less sensible to use wireless broadcast to communicate with static installations. At some point the switch took place, as limited radio bandwidth was reallocated to data services for mobile equipment, and television and other media moved to cable.

== Influence on internet advocacy ==
Cory Doctorow, author and Electronic Frontier Foundation activist, described the process of the switch as unwiring. He framed this as a move away from a global internetwork, which passes through many chokepoints where data may be controlled and inspected, toward one which uses available bandwidth frugally by passing communications in a mesh and avoiding chokepoints. He and Charles Stross wrote a short story on the process, called Unwirer.

The description of the switch in terms of a blend of civil liberty and technology was part of an effort to reimplement the Internet in the interests of the users, freedom and democracy.

== Influences for change to digital television ==
The development of new communication networks helped increase opportunities for new wireless applications. Support for this came from multi-channel video program distributors, network operators, infrastructure suppliers, hardware and software producers, chip makers, and a range of content and application vendors. T.V. providers wanted to supply the households with services, as well as enhancing the system scale. The reallocation of T.V. band spectrums would give social gains towards digital television transitions. Broadcasters that chose to abandon OTA transmissions hoped not to be affected because the expansion of television was influenced by the market.

== See also ==
- Being Digital, a book by Negroponte which discusses the topic
