= Irwin Abrams =

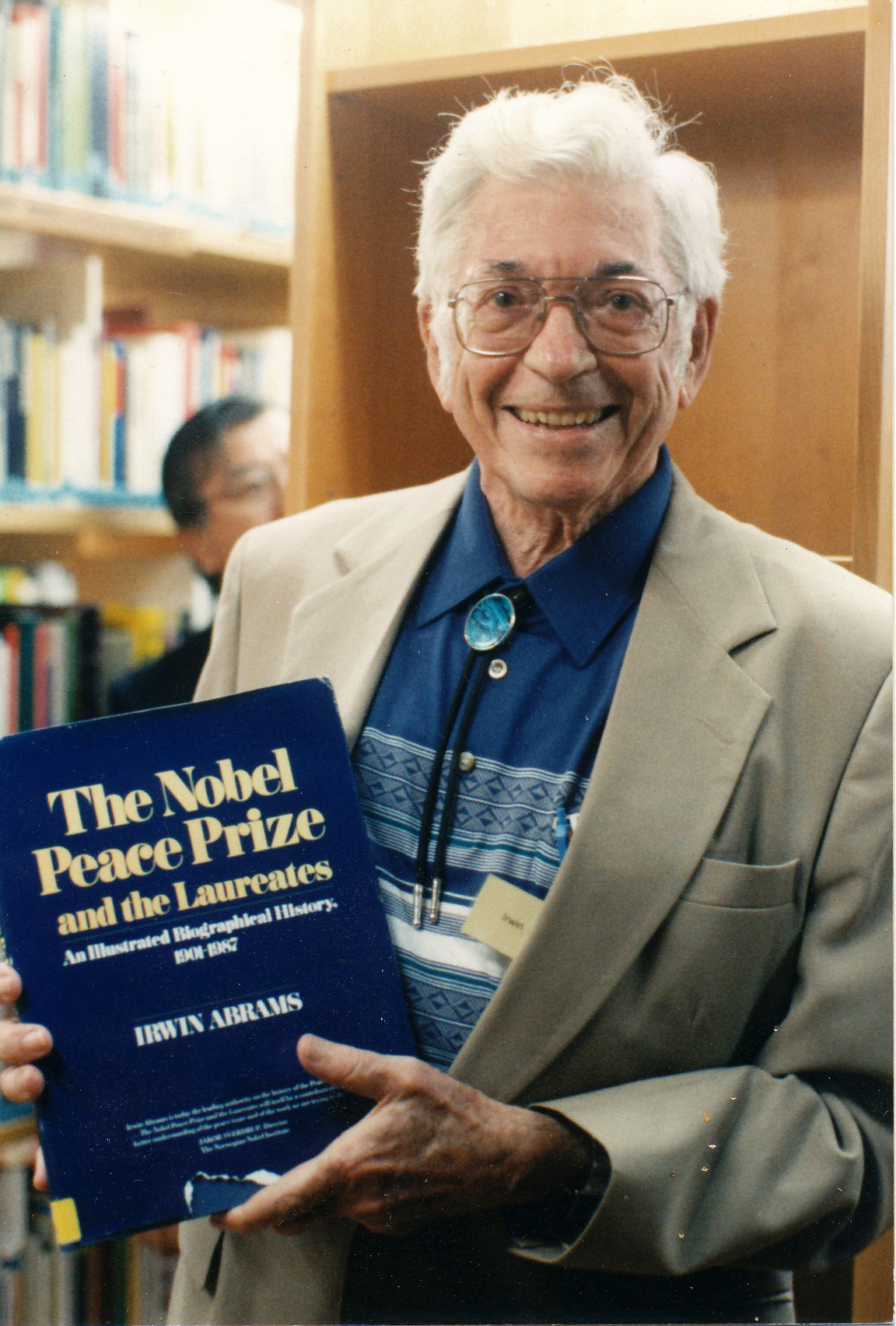
- Irwin Abrams
- Born: February 24, 1914; San Francisco, California
- Died: December 16, 2010 (aged 96); Yellow Springs, Ohio

Irwin Martin Abrams (February 24, 1914 – December 16, 2010) was a long-time professor of history at Antioch College, a pioneer in the field of peace research, and a global authority on the Nobel Peace Prize.

His book, The Nobel Peace Prize and the Laureates, first published in 1988 and subsequently updated and revised, is regarded as the authoritative reference work on the subject.

His other books included Words of Peace, which brought together selections from the acceptance speeches of Nobel Peace Prize laureates, and five volumes of Nobel Lectures in Peace.

== Life and career ==
Irwin Abrams was born in San Francisco in 1914. He graduated from Lowell High School in December 1930 at the age of 16. He went on to earn a bachelor's degree from Stanford University and a master's degree and Ph.D. from Harvard University. In 1936-37, he traveled to Europe to do research for his dissertation. It was a formative experience. He met many outstanding leaders and scholars of the international peace movement and delved into previously unknown source materials.

"Abrams opened and explored archival sources on which a generation of historians would come to depend," the Magazine of History said in a 1994 profile. "His dissertation, 'A History of European Peace Societies, 1867-1899,' won the Charles Sumner Peace Prize and, although it was never published, it has been called 'the most quoted unpublished dissertation in history'. Whether or not that is factual, it has the ring of truth, for Abrams's 1938 work and his subsequent writing gave direction and inspiration to historians on both sides of the Atlantic when the study of peace in history blossomed a generation later."

Born Jewish, Abrams became a Quaker in the late 1930s, inspired in part by his research on the early peace movement and his friendships with British philosopher Gerald Heard and others. He later wrote that joining the Society of Friends was the final step in a move away from liberal humanism toward the ideal of pacifism and nonviolence. He came to believe that "to change the world you had to change yourself."

During World War II, Abrams fulfilled his obligations as a conscientious objector by working with the American Friends Service Committee, or AFSC, in Philadelphia. He researched international relief work, directed training for AFSC relief workers from 1943 to 1946 and organized the Quaker International Workcamp Program the following year. During that time, his wife Freda, whom he had married in 1939, stayed home with their two young children, David and Carole. A third child, James, was born a few years later.

The family moved to Yellow Springs, Ohio, in 1947 when Abrams joined the faculty of Antioch College. He organized the Department of History and created an introduction to western civilization still fondly remembered by many Antioch alumni. He became a full professor in 1951, Distinguished University Professor in 1979, and "emeritus" two years later.

Throughout his Antioch years, Abrams was nudged beyond the classroom by his Quaker concern for peace, his pioneering studies of the historic European peace movement and his own international experience. He became, as he wrote, "a theorist and practitioner" in study abroad and intercultural experience. The number of international exchanges, including study abroad, was rising rapidly, and he saw this as a valuable opportunity to encourage cross-cultural understanding.

After his retirement from teaching, Abrams published the first of several books on the Nobel Peace Prize. His The Nobel Peace Prize and the Laureates: An Illustrated Biographical History was published in 1988. It was recognized as an "outstanding reference work" by the American Library Association. He went on to publish other works on the prize, including Words of Peace, which brings together selections from the acceptance speeches of the prizewinners, and five volumes of Nobel Lectures in Peace.

Of writing about the laureates, he wrote, "It's been a rich experience to live with these people all of these years." He met many of the prizewinners, including the Dalai Lama, Desmond Tutu, Willy Brandt and Martin Luther King Jr. Another laureate, José Ramos-Horta, the current president of East Timor, considered him a friend. Abrams "led a life of scholarly integrity, intellectual and moral rectitude, compassion and faith in humanity, encompassing a whole century of profound transformation in the history of our small world", Ramos-Horta said.

Abrams was honored on numerous occasions by colleagues and former students. In 1997, he received an honorary doctorate from Antioch University. In 2000, he was given a distinguished lifetime service award by the Peace History Society and the Peace History Commission of the International Peace Research Association.

In 2003, the Antioch College Alumni Association presented him with the Arthur Morgan Award "for his long and exemplary service to the Antioch College community, the education community and the global community".

Abrams said that the happiest outcome of his teaching years was when his students from the class of 1955 came together in 2005 – 50 years later – and raised funds for a peace education memorial fund in his name.

He was inducted into the "Walk of Fame" in Dayton, Ohio, in the fall of 2007 and has a square on the sidewalk on W. Third Street in Dayton commemorating his achievements. The inscription states that "Dr. Abrams brought recognition to Antioch University" as a "scholar, author, educator and humanitarian."

== Selected bibliography ==
- The Nobel Peace Prize and the Laureates: An Illustrated Biographical History (G.K. Hall, 1988; Science History Publications, 2001)
- Words of Peace (Newmarket Press, 1994)
- Nobel Lectures in Peace, 1971-1995 in 3 Volumes (World Scientific, 1997)
- The Iraq War and Its Consequences with Wang Gungwu (World Scientific, 2003)
- Nobel Lectures in Peace, 1996-2000 (World Scientific, 2005)
- Nobel Lectures in Peace, 2001-2005 with Scott London (World Scientific, 2009)
