= Digitality =

Condition of living in a digital culture

Digitality (also known as digitalism) is used to mean the condition of living in a digital culture, derived from Nicholas Negroponte's book Being Digital in analogy with modernity and post-modernity.

== Overview ==
Aspects of digitality include nearly continuous contact with other people through cell phones, near instantaneous access to information through the World Wide Web, third-wave information storage (where any fragment in a text can be searched and used for categorization, such as through search engine Google), and communicating through weblogs and email.

Some of the negative aspects of digitality include computer viruses and spam.

Children at younger ages are learning to communicate in the digital world rather than face-to-face. They are becoming more digitally literate which creates a new culture where children communicate more efficiently online than they do in person.

== Development ==
In the 1990s, literature on the effects of interactivity with information began to be written and published, particularly focused on the immediacy and ubiquity of digital communications, and the interactivity and participatory nature of digital media. While traditionally in Postmodernism a decisive role for media in the formation of personality, culture and social order is presumed, so that this emerged literature differed fundamentally from the analog critical theory, in that the audience now has the ability to do more than create a personal text through their idiolect, as they are able to create newly informed texts which reinforce the behavior of other participants. Simply put, digital media made way for individuals to express themselves through online interaction and refine their skills in a communal effort.

Many works have been written outlining the fear of digitality. In the 1990s, the realization of digitality caused many artists to visualize and fear a future where analog would become completely extinct. They viewed digitalization as a deletion of the past.

Although the computer was originally created to complete large scale computations, it ultimately progressed into a processing machine that could retrieve and interpret information very quickly. The first personal computer was first introduced by Ed Roberts in 1975 and this sparked the introduction of other "personal computers". As technology continued to advance, more and more intelligent computers were coming to light with stronger processing power and wider range of utilities. This new age of technology led to the invention of the World Wide Web by Tim Berners-Lee in 1990 which revolutionized the modern world. With the introduction of this World Wide Web people were able to more commonly access a data pool online with a trove of information. This information is now easily accessible from a Smartphone which can connect people from anywhere at any time.

== In the 21st century ==
Digital technology plays an important role in 21st century life. In the United States, nearly two-thirds of people own smartphones. Using social networking services and online forums, people are able to communicate with other users, regardless of geographic region or time constraints. The rise of this type of interaction partly explains the significant increase in phone use in younger people, and mobile technology is mainly used for the purposes of communication. Digitalism is also slowly replacing many forms of physical aids, such as print encyclopedias and dictionaries, with people turning to newer technology for various needs. In his book, Nicholas Negroponte explains how necessities in the future will be digitized. For example, a large proportion of mass media (including newspapers and magazines) are becoming digitized, and a large percentage of financial transactions made in the United States are being made without the physical exchange of money (e.g. online).

Computation is frequently discussed in debates on digitally. Modern theorists are now choosing to focus more on our relation to computers rather than the computers themselves as an important element of digitality.

== Creative and Cultural Interpretations ==
Recent explorations of digitality extend beyond academic and theoretical contexts, finding expression in artistic and cultural works that reflect on the lived experience of life in a digitally mediated world. One such example is Across the Stack: Digital Minds Collide, a creative series curated by writer Tate Ellis through the newsletter Love to Hate and the Joy we Find, hosted on the independent platform Substack. The collection brings together essays, fragments, and multimedia pieces that examine how digital life shapes identity, memory, imagination, and emotional connection.

This creative turn in digital commentary parallels work by other contemporary writers using digital platforms to explore digitality, such as the newsletter The Convivial Society by L.M. Sacasas, which critically engages with technology and culture from a philosophical perspective. These works illustrate how digital publishing itself can function both as a subject of critique and as a vehicle for exploring the evolving human condition under digitality.

== Social media ==
Social media are computer-generated tools that allow for people to convey their thoughts, ideas, or interests through digital communities or networks. Social media are online platforms for human interactions with local and global reach, designed to circulate information. These platforms support social interactions and give rise to a complex interplay between communication, social practices, and technological infrastructure. This gives way to connection of all these components in real-time, so that through these connections people, information, data and events are instantly and globally spread. This allows for platforms like Twitter to be a media medium where there is an intersection of media and social interaction.

Social media is different from social networks, but is commonly looked at as the same, which makes public differentiation harder.

Just like television and advertisements, social media has great potential for business and marketing opportunities where companies can formulate custom promotions geared for specific audiences.

== Education ==
Digitality in the 2000s has had a great impact on the world of education. The internet creates an abundance of easily accessible and globally diverse resources. The digitization of textbooks and other written texts reduces the demand for the print versions. A vast majority of books now come with a digital version of the text that allows for easier access from anywhere. This applies to scholarly textbooks, religious texts, books, and other texts that would normally have to be found in physical form. Digitalism has also made it so that children are now presented with electronic knowledge at a very early age, resulting in the increased implementation of electronics in school systems (for example in electronic learning, mobile learning, and blended learning). Students and academics alike have adopted social media such as Facebook, Twitter, YouTube, and blogging platforms to expand the horizons for learning.

== Intercultural communication ==
Intercultural communication is an important part of globalization. In the past, intercultural communication was made difficult because of the distance separating different cultures. However, with modern-day technology and digitality, it is becoming increasingly possible to interact and learn about other cultures in an environment where people can openly speak. This interaction allows for people to compare and reflect upon both their own and different cultures. The internet creates platforms and forums where people from different backgrounds can develop intercultural communication skills and gain a cross-cultural abundance of knowledge. With the digitality of religious texts and cultural meetings, it is increasingly feasible to be submerged in a culture or religion without the need to travel to the source.

== See also ==
- Critical theory
- Deconstruction
- Digital philosophy
- Information Age
- Internet culture
- Media influence
- Modernity
- Postmodernism
- Postmodernity

== Bibliography ==
- Bignell, Jonathan. Post Modern Media Culture. Akaar Books, 2000.
- Buckingham, David (March 2007). "Digital Media Literacies: Rethinking Media Education in the Age of the Internet". Research in Comparative and International Education. 2 (1): 43–55. doi:10.2304/rcie.2007.2.1.43. S2CID 51995385.
- Franklin, Seb. Control: Digitality as Cultural Logic. MIT Press, 2015.
- Giannini, Tula; Bowen, Jonathan P (2019). Museums and Digital Culture. Series on Computational Computing. Springer. doi:10.1007/978-3-319-97457-6. ISBN 978-3-319-97456-9. S2CID 146115899.
- Hershman, Lynn. "The Fantasy Beyond Control." Illuminating Video: An Essential Guide to Video Art, 1990.
- King, Homay. Virtual Memory: Time-Based Art and the Dream of Digitality. Duke University Press, 2015. ISBN 978-0822360025.
- Jarzombek, Mark. Digital Stockholm Syndrome in the Post-Ontological Age. University of Minnesota Press, 2016
- Landow, George P. Hypertext 3.0: Critical Theory and New Media in an Era of Globalization. 3rd ed., Baltimore, The Johns Hopkins University Press, 2006.
- Landsberg, Alison (September 2016). "Homay King. Virtual Memory: Time-Based Art and the Dream of Digitality . Durham, N.C.: Duke University Press, 2015. 216 pp". Critical Inquiry. 43 (1): 215–216. doi:10.1086/688298.
- Rutten, Kris; Vandermeersche, Geert (1 September 2013). "Introduction to Literacy and Society, Culture, Media and Education". CLCWeb: Comparative Literature and Culture. 15 (3). doi:10.7771/1481-4374.2238. ProQuest 2272302560.
- Shelly, Gary B., and Misty E. Vermaat. Discovering Computers 2010: Living in a Digital World. Boston, MA: Course Technology Press, 2009.
- MacKenzie, Scott; Stenport, Anna Westerståhl; Traylor, Garrett (2016). "Action, Avatar, Ecology, and Empire: Databases, Digitality, Death, and Gaming in Werner Herzog's Arctic". The Moving Image: The Journal of the Association of Moving Image Archivists. 16 (2): 45–71. doi:10.5749/movingimage.16.2.0045. JSTOR 10.5749/movingimage.16.2.0045. S2CID 194685323.
- Swanstrom, Lisa (2016). "External Memory Drives: Deletion and Digitality in Agrippa (A Book of The Dead)". Science Fiction Studies. 43 (1): 14–32. doi:10.5621/sciefictstud.43.1.0014.
