= Jupiter's Wife =

1995 documentary film

- Directed by: Michel Negroponte
- Written by: Gabriel Morgan; Michel Negroponte
- Produced by: Michel Negroponte; Doug Block; Jane Weiner
- Starring: Maggie Cogan; Katina Commings
- Cinematography: Michel Negroponte
- Edited by: Michel Negroponte; Carrie Ansell; Alan Oxman; Deborah Rosenberg; Don Wyllie
- Music by: Beo Morales; Brooks Williams
- Distributed by: Blackbridge Productions
- Release date: August 18, 1995 (United States)
- Running time: 87 minutes
- Country: United States
- Language: English

Jupiter's Wife is a 1995 documentary film, directed by American producer and director Michel Negroponte, about Maggie Cogan, a charismatic homeless woman living in New York City's Central Park who believes she is the Roman goddess Juno, married to the god Jupiter, and daughter of the late American actor Robert Ryan. Cogan was the first female coachman in Central Park, while working for the Plaza Hotel. The film won several awards at various film festivals, including the Sundance Film Festival and Vancouver International Film Festival; and won an Emmy for Outstanding Individual Achievement in Documentary.

== Synopsis ==
While filming a documentary about Central Park in New York City, cinematographer Michael Negroponte (who narrates the film), befriends a woman carrying an overly large backpack full of her personal belongings, leading a pack of six dogs. Upon meeting Negroponte, the woman says she has been expecting him. Her name is Maggie Cogan, an eccentric yet beguiling homeless woman who claims to be the daughter of actor Robert Ryan; and also the wife of the god Jupiter, who she communicates with through radio waves. Despite her display of self confidence, Cogan cannot hide her eccentricities: she plays mother to her dogs, gives St. James Church as her residential address, claims that she is the Roman goddess Juno, and says that she receives messages through songs like "Stairway to Heaven" and "Radar Love" that play via her headphones. She also claims to have ESP (Cogan correctly predicts both the day and time of the birth of Negroponte's daughter, Ramona: September 13th at 4:30). Cogan says she became homeless in 1986; but has a support network of friends, including Katina Pendleton, wife of actor Austin Pendleton. Pendleton checks on Cogan periodically; bringing her food and finding veterinary care for her dogs. Cogan makes several fantastical claims, including: having been kidnapped, a mother of quintuplets, separated from her relatives yet in tune with them at the same time, and able to connect with celebrities such as John Lennon long after their "alleged" deaths. As the film progresses, the truth is revealed, however, that Cogan is not Robert Ryan's daughter; but instead she befriended his actual daughter, Lisa, when they both drove horse-drawn carriages in Central Park in the 1970s. Cogan was the first female coachman in Central Park, while working for the Plaza Hotel. Footage is discovered of Cogan appearing in a 1967 Universal newsreel with her horse and carriage, and in 1968, on the syndicated version of the quiz show What's My Line?. Throughout the film, Negroponte uncovers the realities of Cogan's past life versus the life that she has created in her mind. She was a college student, wife, and mother; who had two sons but decided to give them up in the early 1970s when her life began to become unmanageable. A witty, articulate, and highly intelligent woman, Cogan draws upon her knowledge of literature, history and Greek mythology to help make sense of her current life.

== Cast ==
- Maggie Cogan
- Katina Commings (as Katina Pendleton)
- Michael Negroponte (uncredited / narrator)

== Production ==
The film was shot on location in Central Park over a two-year period (1989 to 1991) with a Super/VHS camcorder and then transferred to 35mm film. Director Negroponte was 42 years old and teaching film production at New York University at the time of filming. He invited Lisa Ryan, who lived with Cogan in 1977, to be a part of the documentary; but she declined. "I was sorry I hadn't been in it," Ryan said, "There was something so incredibly touching and sad about the way Maggie talked about her life."

== Distribution ==
Jupiter's Wife received its domestic release by Artistic License on August 18, 1995 at the Sundance Film Festival; and its theatrical release on September 8, 1995. It was released on VHS and Home Video Distribution by New Video Group on January 28, 1997; and DVD on March 29, 2004 by Docurama.

== Awards and nominations ==
Year	Award	Association	Result	Ref.
1995	Best Documentary Feature Award	Santa Barbara International Film Festival	Won	
1995	Special Jury Recognition for Directing	Sundance Film Festival	Won	
1995	Grand Jury Prize	Sundance Film Festival	Nominated	
1995	Best Documentary Feature	Vancouver International Film Festival	Won	
1995	Outstanding Individual Achievement in Documentary	Emmy Awards	Won	

== See also ==
- List of American films of 1995
- List of films set in New York City
