= Daily Me =

Term for an on-line personal daily newspaper

Daily Me is a term that describes a virtual daily newspaper customized for an individual's tastes. This term was popularized by MIT Media Lab founder Nicholas Negroponte. The term has also been associated with the phenomenon of individuals customizing and personalizing their news feeds, resulting in their being exposed only to content they are already inclined to agree with.

The Daily Me is a term popularized by MIT Media Lab founder Nicholas Negroponte to describe a virtual daily newspaper customized for an individual's tastes. Negroponte discusses it in his 1995 book, Being Digital, referencing a project under way at the Media Lab, Fishwrap. Designed by Pascal Chesnais and Walter Bender and implemented by Media Lab students, the system allowed a greater deal of customization than commercially available systems in 1997.

Fred Hapgood, in a 1995 article in Wired, credited the concept and phrase to Negroponte's thinking in the 1970s.

In Steven Johnson's book Emergence: The Connected Lives of Ants, Brains, Cities, and Software, which concerns emergent properties, Johnson addresses some of Negroponte's fears with homeostasis and feedback systems in mind. He argues that a newspaper tailored to the tastes of a person on a given day will lead to too much positive feedback in that direction, and people's choices for one day would permanently affect their viewings for the rest of their lives. Since the book's release, in 2001, many customer-oriented websites, such as Amazon.com and Half.com, regularly utilize a customer's past views and purchases to determine what merchandise they believe will entice the customer's interest.

The term has also been associated with the phenomenon of individuals customizing and personalizing their news feeds, resulting in their being exposed only to content they are already inclined to agree with. The Daily Me can thus be a critical component of the "echo chamber" effect, defined in an article in Salon by David Weinberger as "those Internet spaces where like-minded people listen only to those people who already agree with them."

Cass Sunstein, a law professor at the University of Chicago, analyzes the implications of the Daily Me in his book Republic.com. Daily me and echo chambers have been suggested as one of the extremes of society induced by technology, the other being Tyranny of the majority.

Zite was a popular application that was similar to the Daily Me concept. It was available on iOS, Android, and Windows Phone. FeedSavvy.com is a similar service available on the web for PC and Mac users. noosfeer is addressing this issue by letting the users explore subjects with a wider range in the results, avoiding the filter bubble effect.

== See also ==
- Collaborative filtering
- Filter bubble
- Recommendation system
