= Nicholas Negroponte =

Greek American architect (born 1943)

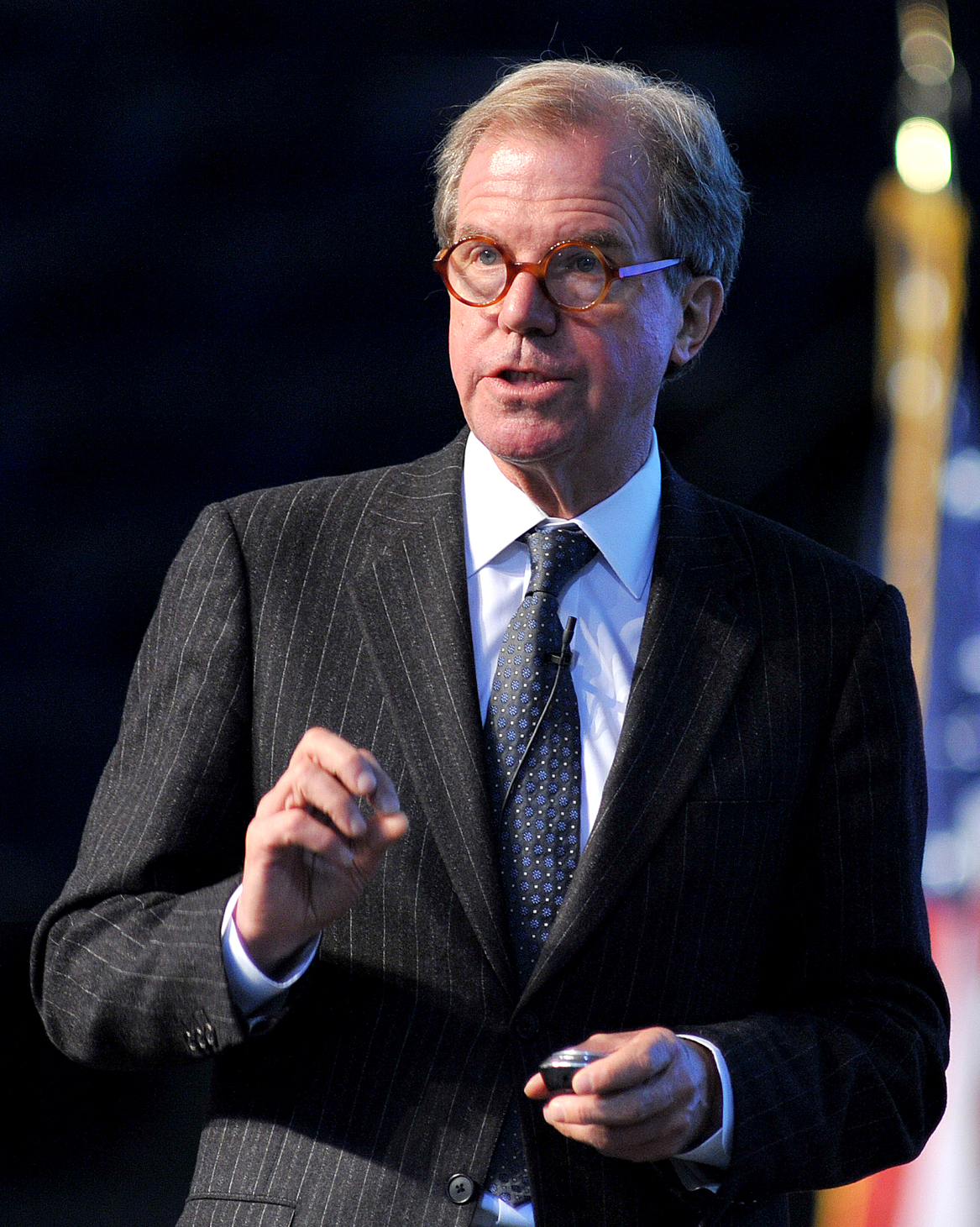
- Nicholas Negroponte delivering the Forrestal Lecture to the US Naval Academy in Annapolis, MD, on April 15, 2009
- Born: December 1, 1943 (age 82); New York City, New York
- Occupations: Academic and computer scientist
- Children: Dimitri Negroponte

Nicholas Negroponte (born December 1, 1943) is a Greek American architect. He is the founder and chairman emeritus of Massachusetts Institute of Technology's Media Lab, and also founded the One Laptop per Child Association (OLPC). Negroponte is the author of the 1995 book Being Digital translated into more than forty languages.

== Early life ==
Negroponte was born to Dimitrios Negropontis (Greek: Νεγροπόντης), a Greek shipping magnate, competitive alpine skier and member of the Negroponte family. He grew up in New York City's Upper East Side. He has three brothers. His elder one, John Negroponte, is the former United States Deputy Secretary of State. Michel Negroponte is an Emmy Award-winning filmmaker. George Negroponte is an artist and was President of the Drawing Center from 2002 to 2007.

He attended Buckley School in New York, Fay School in Massachusetts, Le Rosey in Switzerland, and The Choate School (now Choate Rosemary Hall) in Wallingford, Connecticut, from which he graduated in 1961. Subsequently, he studied at MIT as both an undergraduate and graduate student in Architecture where his research focused on issues of computer-aided design.

Yona Friedman recalls having met Negroponte in 1964 when he was still a student at MIT, where he had discussed with Friedman his idea for an "Architecture Machine". The architecture machine is considered by Negroponte to be a machine collaborator, who engages in an ongoing architectural design process with a human peer. Both machine and human participants engage in a process of mutual training and growth with each other, in order to harness the interactive potential found in peer-to-peer collaborations during an architectural design process with man and machine instead.

He earned a master's degree in architecture from MIT in 1966. Despite his accomplished academic career, Negroponte has spoken publicly about his dyslexia and his difficulty in reading.

== Career ==
=== MIT ===
Negroponte later joined the faculty of MIT in 1966. For several years thereafter he divided his teaching time between MIT and several visiting professorships at Yale, Michigan and the University of California, Berkeley. He also during 1966, had a role with IBM which could potentially provide funding for research to find means of using computers to help architects, planners and designers.

He attended Avery Johnson's lab and seminars at the MIT Sloan school. He eventually met Warren Brodey, who Negroponte described as being “one of the earliest and most important influences”. According to Evgeny Morozov, it was through Brodey that the ideas of "soft architectures" and "intelligent environments" became established in Negroponte's thinking.

In 1967, Negroponte founded MIT's Architecture Machine Group, a combination lab and think tank which studied new approaches to human–computer interaction. The Architecture Machine Group was primarily concerned in addressing the potential of computers in architecture. Negroponte argued during this period that computer aided design was only making activities such as architecture "faster", and that the underlying spirit of the architectural machine group would be to explore the various possibilities for generating collaborating machines for architectural design. The group took funding from DARPA and other parts of The Pentagon to explore early research in human-computer interaction and virtual reality.

The contents of the research from the lab were composed into two books: The Architecture Machine: Towards a More Human Environment (1973), and Soft Architecture Machines (1976). Participants in the group included the cybernetician Gordon Pask, who visited Negroponte as a consultant and whose article "Aspects of Machine Intelligence" became the introduction to the section on machine intelligence in Soft Architecture Machines.

In 1985, Negroponte created the MIT Media Lab with Jerome B. Wiesner. As director, he developed the lab into a laboratory for new media and a high-tech playground for investigating the human–computer interface. Negroponte also became a proponent of intelligent agents and personalized electronic newspapers, for which he popularized the term the Daily Me.

=== Wired ===
In 1992, Negroponte was the first investor in Wired Magazine. From 1993 to 1998, he contributed a monthly column to the magazine in which he reiterated a basic theme: "Move bits, not atoms."

Negroponte expanded many of the ideas from his Wired columns into a bestselling book Being Digital (1995), which made famous his forecasts on how the interactive world, the entertainment world and the information world would eventually merge. Being Digital was a bestseller and was translated into some forty languages. Negroponte is a digital optimist who believed that computers would make life better for everyone. However, critics such as Cass Sunstein have criticised his techno-utopian ideas for failing to consider the historical, political and cultural realities with which new technologies should be viewed.

In the 1980s, Negroponte predicted that wired technologies such as telephones would become unwired by using airwaves instead of wires or fiber optics, and that unwired technologies such as televisions would become wired—a prediction commonly referred to as the Negroponte switch.

== Later career ==
In 2000, Negroponte stepped down as director of the Media Lab as Walter Bender took over as executive director. However, Negroponte retained the role of laboratory chairman. When Frank Moss was appointed director of the lab in 2006, Negroponte stepped down as lab chairman to focus more fully on his work with One Laptop Per Child (OLPC) although he retains his appointment as professor at MIT (Professor Post-Tenure of Media Arts and Sciences).

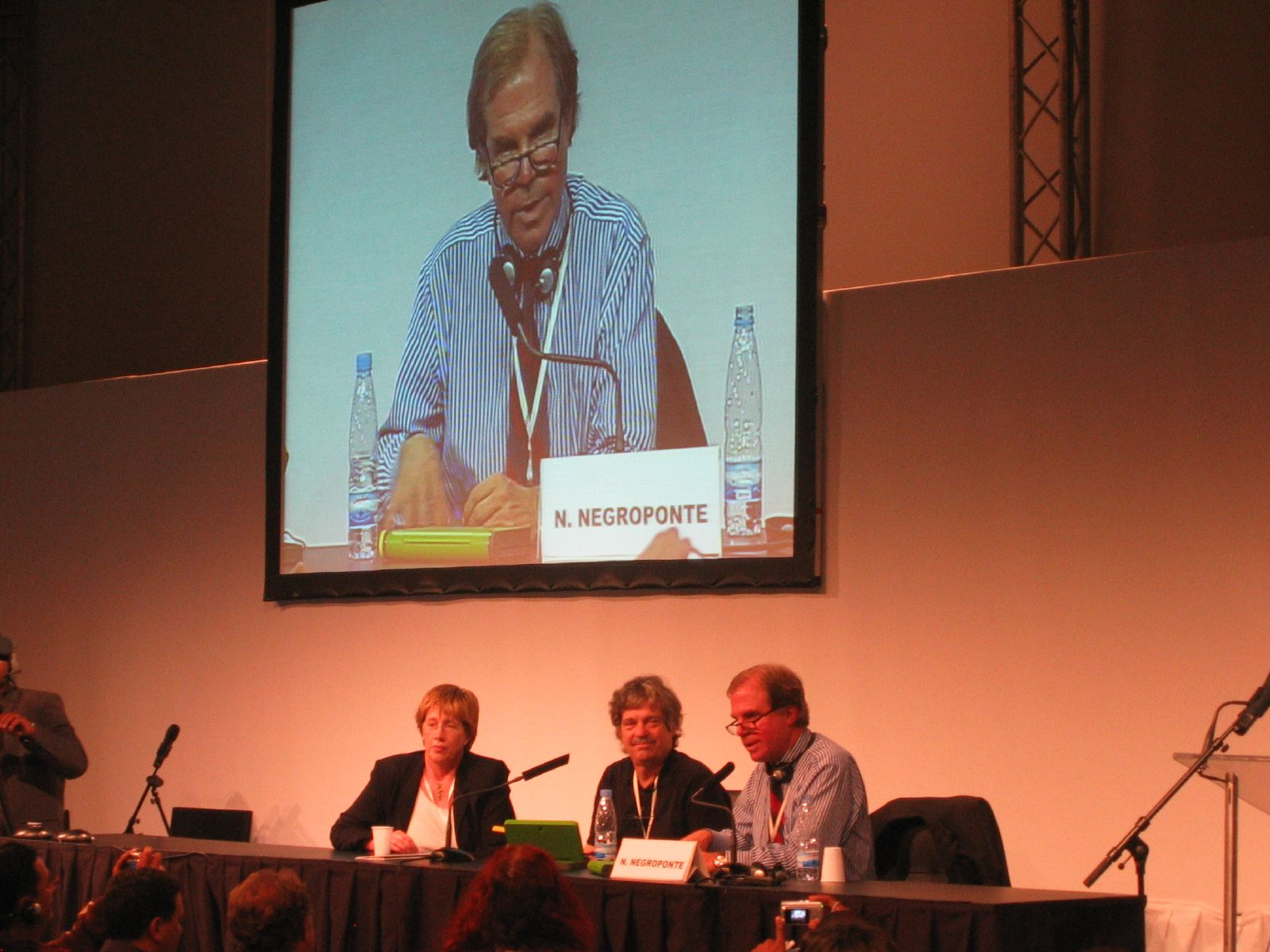
Mary Lou Jepsen, Alan Kay and Nicholas Negroponte unveil the $100 laptop in November 2005.

In November 2005, at the World Summit on the Information Society held in Tunis, Negroponte unveiled the concept of a $100 laptop computer, The Children's Machine, designed for students in the developing world. The price has increased to US$180, however. The project was a part of a broader program by One Laptop Per Child, a nonprofit organization started by Negroponte and other Media Lab faculty to extend Internet access in developing countries.

Negroponte is an angel investor and has invested in over 30 startup companies over the last 30 years, including Zagats, Wired, Ambient Devices, Skype and Velti. He has sat on several boards, including Motorola and Velti. He is also on the advisory board of TTI/Vanguard.

In August 2007, he was appointed to a five-member special committee with the objective of assuring the continued journalistic and editorial integrity and independence of the Wall Street Journal and other Dow Jones & Company publications and services. The committee was formed as part of the merger of Dow Jones with News Corporation. Negroponte's fellow founding committee members are Louis Boccardi, Thomas Bray, Jack Fuller, and the late former Congresswoman Jennifer Dunn.

=== Epstein funding comments ===
In response to the controversy of the MIT Media Lab accepting funding from Jeffrey Epstein five years after Epstein's conviction for sex trafficking minors, Negroponte told MIT staff, "If you wind back the clock, I would still say, 'Take it.'"

Negroponte said that in the fund-raising world these types of occurrences were not out of the ordinary, and they should not be reason enough to cut off business relationships.
