= Being Digital =

1995 book by Nicholas Negroponte

- Being Digital's front cover
- Author: Nicholas Negroponte
- Language: English
- Publisher: Alfred A. Knopf, Inc.
- Publication date: 1995
- Publication place: United States
- Media type: Print
- Pages: 243
- ISBN: 0-679-43919-6

Being Digital is a non-fiction book about digital technologies and their possible future by technology author Nicholas Negroponte. It was originally published in January 1995 by Alfred A. Knopf.

In 1995, Nicholas Negroponte outlines the history of digital technologies in his book, Being Digital. Along with the general history, he also predicts possibilities for the future of these technologies and where he sees their focus on advancement lacking such as his belief that high-definition television becomes obsolete in comparison to its transition to a digital medium. Being Digital provides a general history of several digital media technologies, many that Negroponte himself was directly involved in developing. The message in Nicholas Negroponte's, Being Digital, is that eventually, we will move toward an entirely digital society (be it newspapers, entertainment, or sex). Being Digital also introduces the "Daily Me" concept of a virtual daily newspaper customized for an individual's tastes. This prediction has also come to pass with the advent of web feeds and personal web portals.

== Synopsis ==
Being Digital is made up of an introduction, three parts, and an epilogue. In the first part Negroponte discusses the fundamental difference between bits and atoms. He describes "atoms" as a weighted mass form such as a book and "bits" as "instantaneous and inexpensive transfer of electronic data" that "move at the speed of light." The "bit" is digital or virtual where there is no mass and it can travel and communicate instantaneously throughout multiple platforms. The public utilizes and depends on the information superhighway because the people demand instantaneous results. Bits bring upon instant results without weight or physical matter to rummage through. Decentralizing, globalizing, harmonizing, and empowering are the four qualities of the digital age. Negroponte points out that though we are emerging into a digital world, we still experience the world in analog form. Analog form consists of many atoms the senses, such as sight and touch, are analog receptors. A disadvantage he points out about bits is the "constraints of the medium on which it is stored or through which it is delivered."

In part two, Negroponte discusses the importance of the computer's user interface and how underdeveloped design and functionality can make "being digital" so needlessly complicated. Negroponte views good interface design as the computer's ability to "know you, learn about your needs, and understand verbal and nonverbal languages." Negroponte also discusses the importance of a computer's graphical persona and how that influences users' interactions with the machine. In part three, "Digital Life", the author states that humanity is in the post-information age where "true personalization" is imminent. The machines will understand individuals and their preferences as humans understand humans.

=== "Negroponte Switch" ===
In the 1980s, Negroponte had originated an idea that came to be known as the "Negroponte Switch." Negroponte Switch refers to the information transmission medium used by different devices. He suggested that due to accidents of engineering history we had ended with static devices such as televisions receiving their content via signals traveling over the airways, while devices that should have been mobile and personal, such as telephones, were receiving their content over static cables. It was his idea that a better use of available communication resources would result if information such as phone calls going through cables was to go through the air, and information now going through the air, such as television signals, was to be delivered over cables. Negroponte called this "trading places", but his co-presenter, George Gilder, at an event organized by Northern Telecom called it the "Negroponte Switch" and the name stuck. An example is telephones, The mobility that cellular phones provided meant that telephones would become wireless, while the increasing bandwidth requirements for television meant that they would become hardwired.

== Analysis ==
=== Manipulation of bits ===
Much of what Negroponte states is that there is more dependency on the "bits", and that they are not confined to the "constraints of physical reality". However, the energy and material that make up these bits prove that information technology is very much "grounded in the physical environment". James Martin, in response to Negroponte's assumption, calls this new dematerialized world the "Wired Society". Martin predicts that the information superhighway allows for a "radical restructuring of both social and geographical relationships". The result is that people will choose the country life over the city life. Yet, this is not the case. An example Ensmenger and Slayton use is that our global climate change is very dependent on the "assistance of massive databases and complex programs for simulation". Atoms will not completely disappear because of the bit emergence.The people will not dramatically shift to the rural life because the information technology will prove simpler as the country life seems to represent. Rare earth elements are essential to both information technology and alternative fuel industries. The elements used to produce alternative fuel industries will cause electronic waste, or e-waste. This "implicates the entire digital economy in the transnational flow of toxic materials". More so, the article argues that it is not so much the "bits" that are essential for the information superhighway, but rather the electron. It is the electrification systems that prove to be more efficient in the twentieth century. Yet, it did not decrease the use of resources, or the atomic component. Computers are able to function without the "binary digits", yet they are useless without the electricity, or electron.

=== Back to atoms ===
Bernd Schmitt argues that the digital revolution is going from bits back to atoms. He says the consumer experience with "technocultural consumption" is far less favored then its physical and solid products. There is less enjoyment in the digital realm. An example is that people are less likely to "donate" for a digital souvenir than a physical souvenir, such as a photograph. He says there is a stronger sense of "psychological ownership". Physical possessions resemble a person's self-identity.

Schmitt predicts that medical AI is likely to "become a $10 billion industry in the US by 2025 and replace 80% of the work that doctors do". However, people prefer human interaction regarding medical care than some algorithm-made technology.

Schmitt does agree with Negroponte on the notion that whatever can be digital, will become digital. An area that is still in development is where technology is increasingly becoming humanized. Schmitt believes there will be no difference between a machine and a human being.

In a group focus research conducted on gamers, it shows that a game was less enjoyed when given help from a "computerized helper" as opposed to a helper "construed as a mindless entity".

=== The digital ===
Thomas Haigh argues that "the digital" has always been sold to be a new realm of human experience. However, the digital stems from the AMC "computing machinery" because of the quantities the computer calculated with were represented by numbers 1s and 0s binary numbers. He argues that the term digital was not necessary to use with computers by the 1970s. In 1993, Wired released a new resonance of the term digital. In Wired, Negroponte promotes the idea of "the digital". He states that Negroponte claims past things made of atoms are all important, and in the future everything that mattered would be "made of bits". Elaborating on the fact that the computer's digital nature and main focal points shouldn't just be on it being an "information machine". He then quotes Negroponte's predictions of "cuff links or earrings communicating with each other, phones being able to respond to calls, socializing in digital neighborhoods, mass media being refined by systems for transmitting and receiving personalized information and entertainment, and more". Haigh agrees that "our phones do support call screenings, online communities have contributed to increasing curtail and political polarization". Also, new platforms like Netflix, social media and YouTube have done more that "refine" mass media. The digital environment that Negroponte has mentioned is a new area of "the digital", but "the digital" has been a thing since 1940s. Negroponte predictions relate more to the "future area" which is the current.

=== Cybernetic subjectivity ===
Timothy Luke prefers the notion of "cybernetic subjectivity" as opposed to Negroponte's concept of being digital. He says it better exemplifies the idea that being digital is more an idea of teaching individuals what or how to think. They develop an additional consciousness.

==== Some Varieties of Digital Being ====
The government is one preliminary form. It is when the government and politics use persuasive tactics on the people's decision making. Voters do not act on their own will but rather become these mind-trained or manipulated robots. Being digital is "animal-like". Luke categorizes digitalization into categories: Nature/Culture, Humanity/Technology, History/Society, and Being/Time. He points out that Negroponte recognizes that humans are a form of atoms and realms of "mentality, dimensionality, and temporality" unfold into bits This concept is what cybernetic subjectivity is all about.

==== Virtual Personae ====
Luke talks of the hacker, remote worker, or the web surfer emerging and representing themselves as cyber subjects. He says these positions of "individual agency are more than minor variants of conventional tool usage" and that they bring more participation in which causes a buzz or stir.

==== Androidized Machines ====
Another form is the transformation of devices into smart-talking digital beings. Human-like traits of consciousness, intelligence, personality, memory, speech, and experience are embedded into once non interactive machines. Luke explains this as Negroponte's bits occupying atoms.

==== Netizenship ====
Luke says there is an issue with many people putting trust in Negroponte's optimism of the new age in multimedia and various platforms. He believes few look at the consequences of the netizens producing a better world from emerging technology and greater social participation. Luke says Negroponte's "lame musings of being digital" is a more compound subject and of something more significant. The significance is that being digital is rather digital beings "affecting our history, politics, and culture".

== The Puzzle ==
Included in the sale of some books was a bookmark that contained a puzzle with this text. "The author has devised the puzzle on the other side in binary code, and he claims that no one can crack it. Think you can prove him wrong?" It is unknown if the puzzle has ever been solved.

== Reception ==
In an essay review by Marshall Ruffin, he says Negroponte presents the concept of our society migrating from analog to digital communication in a simplistic way that includes "humor, grace, and no equations". Ruffin says the book is an "enthusiastic prose" piece that is full of "import without technical detail". The lack of technical detail is something that F. W. Landcaster addresses as a problem in his 1996 review, stating the book is "more sociological than technological" which is a result of discussing ideas of futuristic technologies without providing enough detail. However, Landcaster agrees with Ruffin and appreciates the book's coherence and inclusion of "interesting anecdotes and nice humor".

In a 1995 review, Samuel C. Florman acknowledges Negroponte's view of the impending digital age, but finds its implications rather "sinister". He views the book as a piece that "celebrates information while disparaging the material world". This outlook is one that reaffirmed his connection to the physical, which are the atoms Negroponte believes will be phased out.

Kirkus Reviews states that although the book offers "informed observations" on how technology will impact the future, it offers little useful analysis on these concepts. Its wide array of content is scattered and disorganized" and is difficult to follow due to a "veering between oversimplification and clunky jargon". Its main takeaway lies in its "occasional flashes of insight", but is a piece that is muddled by "retreated cyber-hype and familiar predictions".

A common source of concern for many reviews is that Negroponte fails to address the negative implications of being digital. Landcaster and Alex Raksin cite copyright as a prevailing issue that Negroponte does not offer insight on how such data can be protected. Simson L. Garfinkel's concern lies within Negroponte's optimism deterring him from considering the potential misuse of the "highly detailed, personal information" that is used to fuel this advancement in technology.

Scott London, a California-based author and journalist, reviewed the book as "Being Dismal", and does not "claim" the same digital technology optimism Negroponte holds for the future.

In an essay review, Barry M. Katz describes the book to be filled with "stimulating, suggestive ideas that can only feed the imagination". However, Katz does recognize that Negroponte writes with "uncritical zeal", and says that although the book predicts the future with "advent steam", it fails to acknowledge the world "that passed".

Martin Levinson says reading the book will "allow you to talk more intelligently with technologically sophisticated young people", and suggests for people to become familiar with Negroponte's "bits and other digital jargon" because the future is being shaped by the "digiterati".

Haigh reviews the timeline of how "being digital" has transformed into different meanings over the years. He goes over his thoughts and ideas about if we are truly being digital today. He discusses the book and analyzes the predictions contained therein.

== See also ==
- Digitality
- Digital revolution

== Bibliography ==
- "Being Digital". Kirkus Reviews. May 20, 2010.
- Ensmenger, Nathan; Slayton, Rebecca (July 2017). "Computing and the Environment: Introducing a Special Issue of Information & Culture". Information & Culture. 52 (3): 295–303.
- Florman, Samuel C. (February 5, 1995). "He Has Seen the Future and It Works". The New York Times.
- Garfinkel, Simson L. (March 15, 1995). "Life Is About More Than 'Being Digital'". The Christian Science Monitor.
- Haigh, Thomas (September 2014). "We Have Never Been Digital". Communications of the ACM. 57 (9): 24–28. doi:10.1145/2644148. S2CID 10588364.
- Katz, Barry M. (Summer 2017). "Book Reviews" (PDF). Design Issues. 13 (2): 77. doi:10.2307/1511733. JSTOR 1511733.
- Knoph, Alfred (April 15, 1996). "The DNA of Information Bits and Atoms".
- Landcaster, F. W. (April 1996). "Review". The Library Quarterly: Information, Community, Policy. 66 (2). The University of Chicago Press: 208–210. JSTOR 4309113.
- Levinson, Martin H. (Fall 1996). "Being Digital". ETC: A Review of General Semantics. 53 (3): 356–357.
- London, Scott (1996). "Being Digital by Nicholas Negroponte :: A Book Review by Scott London". Scott.London.
- Luke, Timothy W. (1997). "Digital Beings & Virtual Times: The Politics of Cybersubjectivity". Theory & Event. 1 (1). doi:10.1353/tae.1991.0011. S2CID 144964269 – via Project MUSE.
- Negroponte, Nicholas (1995). Being Digital. Vintage Books. ISBN 0-679-43919-6.
- "Nicholas Negroponte: 5 predictions, from 1984". TED. February 1984.
- Raksin, Alex (February 17, 1995). "Logging On to a New World : BEING DIGITAL". Los Angeles Times.
- Ruffin, Marshall (April 1995). "On Being Digital". Physician Executive. 21 (4).
- Schmitt, Bernd (Dec 2019). "From Atoms to Bits and Back: A Research Curation on Digital Technology and Agenda for Future Research". Journal of Consumer Research. 46 (4): 825–832. doi:10.1093/jcr/ucz038. hdl:10.1093/jcr/ucz038.
