= Michel Negroponte =

American producer and director

Michel Negroponte is an American producer and director.

== Biography ==
Negroponte was born to Catherine Coumantaros and Dimitrios Negrepontis, a Greek shipping magnate, alpine skier and member of the Negroponte family, and grew up in New York City's Upper East Side. He has three brothers — John (a former United States Deputy Secretary of State), George (President of the Drawing Center from 2002 to 2007) and Nicholas (founder of the Massachusetts Institute of Technology's Media Lab and of the One Laptop per Child project).

The director studied filmmaking alongside filmmakers Richard Leacock and Ed Pincus at the Massachusetts Institute of Technology in the 1970s.

Negroponte has also pursued teaching careers in both graduate and undergraduate film programs at New York University's Tisch School of the Arts, Temple University, and the School of Visual Arts in New York City.

== Filmography ==
=== Director ===
- 1979: Space Coast (Documentary)
- 1981: Resident Exile (Documentary short)
- 1984: Silver Valley (Documentary short)
- 1994: Jupiter's Wife (Documentary)
- 1996: No Accident
- 2001: W.I.S.O.R. (Documentary)
- 2003: The Sightseer (unreleased documentary)
- 2005: Methadonia (Documentary)
- 2010: I'm Dangerous with Love (Documentary)
- 2015: An Autobiography of Michelle Maren (Documentary)

== Awards and accolades ==
Year	Film	Award	
1984	Silvery Valley	Cinéma du Réel Award	Winner
1995	Jupiter's Wife		
1995	Jupiter's Wife	Emmy (Outstanding Individual Achievement in Documentary)	Winner
1995	Jupiter's Wife	Best Documentary Feature Award (Santa Barbara Film Festival)	Winner
1995	Jupiter's Wife	Special Jury Recognition (Sundance Film Festival)	Winner
1995	Jupiter's Wife	Grand Jury Prize (Sundance Film Festival)	Nominated
2006	Methadonia	Emmy (Outstanding Individual Achievement in a Craft: Editing)	Nominated
