= Wireless application service provider =

Wireless networking

A wireless application service provider (WASP) is the generic name for a firm that provides remote services, typically to handheld devices, such as cellphones or PDAs, that connect to wireless data networks. They are a specific category of application service providers (ASPs), though the latter term may more often be associated with standard web services. They can also be used for wireless bridging between different types of network topologies.
