= Scott London =

American journalist

Scott London is an American journalist, author, and photographer known for his public radio reportage and interviews, his fine art photography — most notably, his decades-long documentation of Burning Man — and his written work exploring art, culture, education, politics, and the media.

== Early life ==
London was born in Washington, DC, and spent his childhood in Stockholm, Sweden. In his early twenties, he returned to the United States and eventually landed in Santa Barbara, California, where he moved into a rustic beach house owned by one of the Beach Boys. Reflecting on his arrival in 1993, London described Santa Barbara as a haven for artists, writers and free spirits. "It attracts people from near and far," he wrote, "including restless souls, like me, who thought they were just passing though, but never left."

== Career ==
=== Journalism ===
Scott London began his career in radio, working as a program host and news reporter at WYSO, a public radio station in Ohio. After relocating to California, he launched Insight and Outlook, a weekly series of field interviews with influential writers and thinkers. His aim for the program, he said, was "to offer a trenchant look at the ideas and trends shaping our future." Produced at KCBX in San Luis Obispo, CA, the program gained national distribution in 1995 and aired on NPR stations across the United States into the 2000s. London's work has also been heard on CBS Radio, American Public Media, and the Canadian Broadcasting Corporation.

London's print journalism explores democracy, leadership, education, philanthropy, immigration, and climate change. He has contributed essays and chapters to numerous books, including The Writer's Presence, A Voice in the Wilderness, Saga: Best New Writings on Mythology, Deliberative Pedagogy, American Decades, and Public Thought and Foreign Policy. His reference book Nobel Lectures in Peace (2001-2005), co-edited with historian Irwin Abrams, was commissioned by the Nobel Foundation. In 2010, he contributed to 100 Words: Two Hundred Visionaries Share Their Hope for the Future, a collection of writings from frontier thinkers who have spent their lives working for positive change.

=== Photography ===
When Scott London first attended Burning Man in 2004, he recalled being "struck by the sheer inadequacy of words" in describing the event and decided photography was a more powerful medium for documenting the experience." “What I love about Burning Man,” he said, “is that it’s all about creativity, self-expression, and freedom of imagination.” Over the past two decades, his photographs have appeared in Rolling Stone, Forbes, The Atlantic, CNN, San Francisco Chronicle, The Wall Street Journal, The New York Times, and other major publications.

London's images of the gathering are prominently featured in Burning Man: Art on Fire,a collaboration with writer Jennifer Raiser and photographer Sidney Erthal. Originally published in 2014, the book has spawned multiple editions and won two Foreword INDIES award gold medals. It inspired a full-length documentary film of the same name, produced and directed by Gerald Fox and Sophia Swire, released in 2020.

London’s photographs also appear in other books, including Smoke & Mirrors – Cars, Photography and Dreams of the Open Road by Adam Hay-Nicholls. and Fred Turner's From Burning Man to Facebook: Art, Technology and Management in Silicon Valley. In 2015, he collaborated with the Phoenix-based Vessel Project on Painted Desert, a multidisciplinary fine art series combining photography, costume design, and immersive theater. Commissioned by the Mesa Arts Center, the project was performed at the Spark Festival, the Phoenix Art Museum and other Arizona venues, and garnered coverage in local news media, as well as academic publications.

London’s work has been featured in major exhibitions, including the Smithsonian Institution's No Spectators exhibition at the Renwick Gallery (2018), The Art of Burning Man exhibition at the Hermitage Museum and Gardens in Norfolk, VA (2017), and the City of Dust: The Evolution of Burning Man exhibition at the Nevada Museum of Art in Reno (2017). His photos have also been exhibited internationally at the Louisiana Museum of Modern Art in Denmark (2011), and the Institute of Art and Ideas in the United Kingdom (2009). London's Vanishing Oasis series, a long-term project documenting the ecological collapse of California's Salton Sea, was originally commissioned for a water exhibit by the San Diego Natural History Museum in 2008.

In 2024, Sweden’s national television broadcaster SVT reported on London’s collaboration with Swedish filmmaker Mattias Löw documenting medieval Scandinavian churches, the subject of a forthcoming book.
