= Eleni Ourani =

Greek writer

Alkis Thrylos
- Born: Eleni Ourani; 1896; Athens, Greece
- Died: December 8, 1971 (aged 74–75); Greece
- Occupation: Theatrical producer, actor, scenewriter, theatre teacher and director
- Spouse: Kostas Ouranis

Alkis Thrylos (Greek: Άλκης Θρύλος; born Eleni Ourani (Ελένη Ουράνη); also known as Eleni Ourani-Negreponti; 1896 – December 8, 1971) was a Greek writer. She was a member of the Negroponte (Νεγρεπόντη) family. She was a critic of literature of the theatre. Her husband was the poet Kostas Ouranis. She died on December 8, 1971.
