= Yiannis Kyrou =

Yiannis Kyrou (1942–1991) was a Greek scenic and costume designer, known for his significant contributions to theater and television in Greece.

== Biography ==
Born in Thessaloniki, Kyrou pursued his education in scenic design at the Athens School of Fine Arts and continued his studies in Germany. Kyrou's career in stage design commenced in 1967 with his involvement in the Hellenic Choreodrama group of Rallou Manou. He gained recognition for his work in Pithoprakta by Iannis Xenakis and Apology of Clytemnestra by Theodore Antoniou, which were acclaimed both in Greece and internationally. These productions were notably presented at the Shiraz Arts Festival in Iran. He also worked as a scenographer and costume designer for major Greek organizations (National Theatre of Greece and National Theatre of Northern Greece).

In television, Kyrou had a prominent role from 1975 onwards. He was responsible for the sets and costumes of over a hundred theatrical works broadcast on television, including several TV series and shows. His film contributions included working as an assistant to Michael Cacoyannis on When the Fish Came Out (1966) and designing sets and costumes for Kostas Karayiannis's film Poniro thilyko... katergara gynaika! (1980), featuring Aliki Vouyouklaki.

In the 1980s, Kyrou moved to Chania, where he founded the Amateur Experimental Theater Arena. This initiative aimed to provide a platform for theatrical expression, focusing on quality and experimentation beyond professional boundaries. Yiannis Kyrou died in 1991.
