= Velti =

- Type: Former Public company
- Industry: Mobile Marketing and Advertising
- Founded: London, UK (2001)
- Headquarters: Dublin, Ireland
- Key people: Alex Moukas, Chairman
- Products: Velti Inspire, Velti Excite
- Services: • Mobile CRM • Loyalty solutions • Large scale promotions for mobile operators
- Number of employees: 500+ (250+ technical staff, 250+ business staff)
- Website: www.velti.com

Velti is a mobile marketing company offering its services to mobile operators and brands. The company was founded in 2001, went public in London in 2006 and on NASDAQ in 2011. In 2013 Blackstone, acquired the assets of Velti and the company was taken private.

== History ==
Velti was founded in 2001 by Alex Moukas and Chris Kaskavelis as a software and ASP provider serving the telecommunications industry. The same year, Nicholas Negroponte, then the laboratory chairman of Massachusetts Institute of Technology's Media Lab, joined the company as a non-executive director. In 2002, Velti gained Vodafone as a customer. By the end of that year, the company had reached 35 employees.

After a 2006 initial public offering on the London Stock Exchange's AIM Market, Velti further expanded its U.S. operations with the opening of an office in New York. A San Francisco office was created the following year. Velti was one of the 10-best performing IPOs in London Stock Exchange's AIM in 2007.

Beginning in 2007, Velti entered into a series of joint ventures and partnerships with the Interpublic Group to create Ansible, a mobile marketing joint venture.

In 2008, Velti opened a new office in Beijing and made an investment in CASEE. In India, Velti partnered with HT Media Limited, India's second-largest media group, on a mobile marketing joint venture called HT Mobile Solutions. 2008 also saw the opening of a new Velti office in Moscow.

In 2009, Velti announced the acquisition of Ad Infuse, a provider of personalized mobile advertising in the U.S. increasing the company's headcount to more than 400, including more than 200 technology staff.

In 2010, the company announced the acquisition of Mobclix, A second 2010 acquisition added Media Cannon, a developer of mobile advertising tools and technology. By the end of 2010, Velti had grown to more than 500 employees in 30 countries.

In January 2011, Velti completed an initial public offering of 12 million common stock shares on NASDAQ under the trading symbol VELT. The IPO raised approximately $150 million, according to ROAMdata (Boston-based subsidiary of Ingenico). In September 2011, Velti acquired Air2Web Inc a mobile customer relationship management technology company based in Atlanta for $19 million.

After the company's London and NASDAQ listings, its revenues grew from $90m in 2009 to $116m in 2010 to $189m in 2011 to $270m in 2012.

== Sale to Blackstone and Delisting from Nasdaq ==
In late summer 2013, Velti was forced to write down nearly $111 million of AR, reducing its headcount by almost 20% and placing Mobclix on the chopping block to raise spare cash. These actions led to a severe stock drop.

On November 4, 2013, Velti sold its assets to GSO, the credit division of Blackstone. The US subsidiary asset sale was done under chapter 11, while the all subsidiary (including the US) and the parent company continued normal operations.

On December 16, 2013, Velti voluntarily de-listed from the Nasdaq market in order to complete the sale of assets to Blackstone: "The voluntary decision to delist from NASDAQ was taken following the Company's review of several factors, including its previously disclosed noncompliance with the minimum bid price requirements of NASDAQ.." Velti shares are now traded on the OTC market.

Velti currently operates in 10 countries, is profitable and its main customers include Vodafone, T-Mobile, Orange, Movistar, Airtel, Pepsico, MBC and Nestle. Velti does not provide financial statements since 2013.
