= Kostas Ouranis =

- Born: 12 February 1890; Constantinople, Ottoman Empire
- Died: 12 July 1953 (aged 63); Athens, Greece
- Occupations: Poet, travel writer, journalist, translator, essayist
- Spouse(s): Manuela Santiago; Eleni Ourani
- Writing career
- Period: 1908–1953

Kostas Ouranis (Greek: Κώστας Ουράνης [uˈranis]; born Klearchos Niarchos, Greek: Κλέαρχος Νιάρχος; 12 February 1890 – 12 July 1953) was a Greek poet, travel writer and journalist.

== Life ==
Ouranis was born in Constantinople in 1890 to Nikolaos Niarchos and Angeliki Yannousi from Leonidio, Arcadia, where he grew up and went to elementary school. He went to high school in Nafplion and then Constantinople, where he graduated. In 1908, he moved to Athens and worked as a journalist for a while, before moving to Paris for studies he did not complete.

While there, he suffered from tuberculosis, and relocated to Davos in Switzerland in order to recover. There he met Manuela Santiago from Portugal, they got married but the marriage did not last. His second marriage, which lasted until his death in 1953 was with Eleni Ourani, also known with the pen name Alkis Thrylos (Άλκης Θρύλος).

He was the Greek Consul in Lisbon from 1920 to 1924, when he moved back to Athens and worked as a journalist in many newspapers; as a correspondent he traveled throughout the world. His shaky health, however, deteriorated, especially during the Occupation of Greece (1941–1945). He died from a heart attack in 1953 in Athens.

== Legacy ==
To this day, the Ouranis foundation, run by the Academy of Athens, grants scholarships to foreign students studying Modern Greek Literature, gives each year awards for prose, poetry and essay and publishes works of Greek Literature under the series Νεοελληνική Βιβλιοθήκη (Modern Greek Library).

== Selected works ==
The main part of his works were poetry and travel writing; he also wrote essays and he was a distinguished translator. Many of his works was collected and published posthumously by his widow, Eleni Ourani.

=== Poems ===
- Σαν όνειρα (Like dreams), 1909
- Spleen, 1912
- Νοσταλγίες (Nostalgies), 1920
- Ποιήματα (Poems), 1953

=== Travel writing ===
- Sol y Sombra (Sun and shadow), 1934
- Σινά, το Θεοβάδιστον Όρος (Sinai, the mountain walked by God), 1944
- Ιταλία (Italy), 1953
- Ισπανία (Spain), 1954
- Γλαυκοί δρόμοι (Glaucous Roads), 1955
- Ελλάδα (Greece), 1956
- Από τον Ατλαντικό στη Μαύρη Θάλασσα (From the Atlantic to the Black Sea), 1957

=== Other works ===
- Κάρολος Μπωντλαίρ (Charles Baudelaire), 1918
- Αναβίωση (Rebirth), 1955
- Αποχρώσεις (Tones of Color), 1956
- Δικοί μας και ξένοι (Our own and foreign), 1954-1956 (in three volumes)
- Στιγμιότυπα (Short Cuts), 1958
