= Deaths in January 1991 =

The following is a list of notable deaths in January 1991.

Entries for each day are listed alphabetically by surname. A typical entry lists information in the following sequence:

- Name, age, country of citizenship at birth, subsequent country of citizenship (if applicable), reason for notability, cause of death (if known), and reference.

== January 1991 ==
=== 1 ===
- Inga Gentzel, 82, Swedish Olympic runner (1928).
- Dáithí Ó Conaill, 52, Irish politician and republican.
- Jerome Arthur Pechillo, 71, American Roman Catholic prelate.
- Nicolae Petrescu, 77, Romanian football player and manager.
- Buck Ram, 83, American songwriter and music producer.
- Shinji Tatsuta, 76, Japanese Olympic ski jumper (1936).

=== 2 ===
- Sydney Caine, 88, British economist and educator.
- Edmond Jabès, 78, Egyptian-French writer and poet.
- Joseph C. Fegan Jr., 70, United States Marine Corps general, cancer.
- Irving Johnson, 85, American sailor, adventurer, and writer.
- Jo Ann Marlowe, 55, American child actress.
- Hiroshi Noma, 75, Japanese writer, cancer.
- Gilbert Price, 48, American actor, asphyxiation.
- Habib Ibrahim Rahimtoola, 78, Pakistani politician.
- John Rapacz, 66, American football player (New York Giants, Baltimore Colts).
- Renato Rascel, 78, Italian actor and singer, heart attack.
- Joseph J. Spengler, 88, American economist, Alzheimer's disease.

=== 3 ===
- Fayeq Abdul-Jaleel, 42, Kuwaiti poet, playwright and lyricist, execution.
- Luke Appling, 83, American Hall of Fame baseball player (Chicago White Sox).
- João Azevedo, 75, Portuguese footballer.
- Tom Baker, 77, American baseball player (Brooklyn Dodgers, New York Giants).
- Walter Boninsegni, 88, Italian Olympic sports shooter (1932, 1936, 1948).
- Anna Gmeyner, 88, Austrian-English writer.
- Art Hyatt, 78, American basketball player.
- Andrei Kerekeș, 65, Romanian Olympic gymnast (1952).
- Cipe Pineles, 82, Austrian-American graphic designer, heart attack.
- Reuben Tam, 74, American painter, lymphoma.
- Doris Zinkeisen, 93, Scottish theatrical designer.

=== 4 ===
- Eddie Barefield, 81, American jazz musician, heart attack.
- Bill Byrd, 83, American baseball player.
- Tommy Harris, 67, American baseball player.
- Joe Hoague, 72, American football player (Pittsburgh Steelers, Steagles, Boston Yanks).
- Berry Kroeger, 78, American actor, kidney failure.
- Ib Storm Larsen, 65, Danish Olympic rower (1948).
- Zvonko Lepetić, 62, Yugoslav actor, heart attack.
- Poon Lim, 72, Chinese sailor.
- Richard Maibaum, 81, American playwright and screenwriter (Dr. No, Goldfinger, From Russia with Love).
- Thomas Stanley Matthews, 89, American magazine editor, lung cancer.
- Tokushige Noto, 88, Japanese Olympic sprinter (1924).
- Eric Rodin, 60, American baseball player (New York Giants).
- Sanmao, 47, Chinese-born Taiwanese writer and translator, suicide by hanging.
- Jayantilal Chhotalal Shah, 84, Indian judge and Chief Justice of India.
- Leo Wright, 57, American jazz musician, heart attack.

=== 5 ===
- Hubert Butler, 90, Irish writer.
- Roy Day, 85, Australian rules footballer.
- Tommie Dukes, 84, American baseball player.
- Johnny Eck, 79, American freak show performer and actor (Freaks), heart attack.
- Tõnis Kint, 94, Estonian politician.
- Walt Lamb, 70, American football player (Chicago Bears).
- Vasko Popa, 68, Yugoslav poet.
- Ted Robertson, 61, Australian politician.

=== 6 ===
- Ed Beinor, 73, American gridiron football player (Chicago Cardinals, Washington Redskins).
- Jim Brown, 78, American basketball player.
- Heinrich Dathe, 80, German zoologist, cancer.
- Bobby Estalella, 79, Cuban baseball player (Washington Senators, St. Louis Browns, Philadelphia Athletics).
- Antonio Blanco Freijeiro, 67, Spanish archaeologist.
- Nicholas Marsicano, 82, American painter.
- Ravikant Nagaich, 59, Indian filmmaker.
- Marko Nikezić, 69, Yugoslav politician.
- Ahmed Adnan Saygun, 83, Turkish composer and musicologist.
- Hermann Schlöske, 85, German Olympic sprinter (1928).
- Alan Wiggins, 32, American baseball player (San Diego Padres, Baltimore Orioles), AIDS.

=== 7 ===
- Mitchell Harry Cohen, 86, American district judge (United States District Court for the District of New Jersey).
- Kondrat Krapiva, 94, Soviet writer.
- Henri Louveau, 80, French racing driver.
- José Guilherme Merquior, 49, Brazilian writer and diplomat, cancer.
- Josef Stroh, 77, Austrian football player, Olympian (1948), and manager.
- Charlotte Wynters, 91, American actress.

=== 8 ===
- Steve Clark, 30, English guitarist and songwriter (Def Leppard), alcohol poisoning.
- Ursula Hirschmann, 77, German anti-fascist.
- Henry Rainsford Hulme, 82, British nuclear physicist.
- Windy Nicklaus, 87, American gridiron football player.

=== 9 ===
- Salatyn Asgarova, 29, Soviet journalist, shot.
- Cuthbert Bardsley, 83, British Anglican prelate.
- J. McVicker Hunt, 84, American psychologist.
- Roland Laudenbach, 69, French writer, editor, and journalist.
- Antonio León Ortega, 83, Spanish sculptor.
- Soemarno Sosroatmodjo, 79, Indonesian politician.
- Charles Sterling, 89, Polish-French art historian.

=== 10 ===
- Eva Bosáková, 59, Czechoslovak Olympic gymnast (1952, 1956, 1960).
- Malte Jaeger, 79, German actor, embolism.
- Richard Kuremaa, 78, Estonian football player.
- Bob Wallis, 56, British jazz musician.

=== 11 ===
- Carl David Anderson, 85, American physicist, Nobel Prize recipient (1936).
- Larry Condon, 57, Canadian politician, member of the House of Commons of Canada (1974-1979).
- Garland Frazier, 73, American sports coach.
- Maxine Jennings, 81, American actress.
- Sepp Ketterer, 91, Austrian cinematographer.
- Jaroslav Kučera, 61, Czech cinematographer.
- Walter Frederick Kuhl, 85, Canadian politician, member of the House of Commons of Canada (1935-1949).
- Charles Mozley, 76, British painter.
- Sarangapani Raman, 70-71, Indian football player and Olympian (1948).
- Alec Rose, 82, English sailor.
- Ronald Sanders, 58, American journalist.
- Georg Schäfer, 64, German writer, heart attack.

=== 12 ===
- Charles Drury, 78, Canadian politician.
- Eric Evans, 69, English rugby player.
- Geoff Iden, 76, British runner and Olympian (1952).
- Robert Jackson, 79, Australian public servant.
- Tom Johannessen, 57, Norwegian footballer.
- Keye Luke, 86, Chinese-American actor (Kung Fu, The Green Hornet, Gremlins), stroke.
- Doug McEnulty, 68, American football player (Chicago Bears).
- Vasco Pratolini, 77, Italian writer.
- Niels Rasmussen, 68, Danish Olympic rower (1948).
- Arthur L. White, 83, American Seventh-day Adventist writer, and theology professor.

=== 13 ===
- François Falc'hun, 89, French linguist.
- Tribhuvandas Luhar, 82, Indian poet.
- Eladio Rojas, 56, Chilean football player.
- Ed Williamson, 78, American football coach, cancer.

=== 14 ===
- David Arkin, 49, American actor (All the President's Men, M*A*S*H, The Long Goodbye), suicide.
- Duncan Black, 82, Scottish economist.
- Gordon Bryant, 76, Australian politician.
- Chitragupta, 73, Indian composer.
- Donald Coleman, 65, British politician, heart attack.
- Miles Copeland, Jr., 74, American musician and CIA officer, heart attack.
- Heli Finkenzeller, 76, German actress.
- Irwin Goodman, 47, Finnish singer, heart attack.
- Salah Khalaf, 57-58, Palestinian politician, shot.
- Harry Shorten, 77, American writer, editor, and book publisher.
- Roger Tubby, 80, American diplomat and press secretary.
- Cliff Tyson, 81, Australian rules footballer.

=== 15 ===
- Leona Baumgartner, 88, American physician.
- Amédée Isola, 92, French Olympic runner (1924).
- Vishwa Gopal Jhingran, 72, Indian zoologist.
- Lyle Judy, 77, American baseball player (St. Louis Cardinals).
- Julius Podlipny, 92, Czechoslovak and Romanian artist.
- Karl L. Rankin, 92, American diplomat, prostate cancer.
- Tony Slydini, 90, Italian-American magician.
- Bob Stirling, 71, English rugby union player.

=== 16 ===
- Preston Cloud, 78, American paleontologist, pneumonia.
- Rinaldo Del Bo, 74, Italian politician.
- Nicholas Mansergh, 80, British historian.
- Jabbo Smith, 82, American jazz musician.

=== 17 ===
- Marv Breuer, 76, American baseball player (New York Yankees).
- Denis Johansson, 62, Finnish Olympic middle-distance runner (1948, 1952).
- Giacomo Manzù, 82, Italian sculptor.
- John C. Morgan, 76, American Air Force pilot and Medal of Honor recipient, Alzheimer's disease.
- Paul Mross, 80, Polish-German chess player.
- Olav V of Norway, 87, Norwegian royal, king (since 1957), and Olympic sailor (1928), heart attack.
- Scott Speicher, 33, United States Navy aviator, killed in action.

=== 18 ===
- Bryan Alton, 71, Irish politician and physician.
- Charles W. Davis, 73, American soldier and Medal of Honor recipient.
- Hamilton Fish III, 102, American politician, member of the U.S. House of Representatives (1920–1945).
- Vic Fusia, 77, American gridiron football player and coach, heart attack.
- Herb Harris, 77, American baseball player (Philadelphia Phillies).
- Leo Hurwitz, 81, American documentary filmmaker, colon cancer.
- Jakob Kiefer, 71, German Olympic gymnast (1952, 1956).
- Gilberte Mortier, 83, French Olympic swimmer (1924).

=== 19 ===
- Uzeir Abduramanov, 74, Soviet Red Army officer and war hero during World War II.
- Don Beddoe, 87, American actor.
- Paul Bikle, 74, American aeronautical engineer.
- Winston H. Bostick, 74, American physicist, lung cancer.
- Maria Brodacka, 86, Polish painter.
- Marcel Chaput, 72, Canadian Quebecois independence activist.
- Bobby Combe, 66, Scottish footballer.
- Arnulfo Hernández, 87, Mexican Olympic sports shooter (1932).
- Fiorenzo Marini, 76, Italian Olympic fencer (1948, 1960).
- Gernot Reinstadler, 20, Austrian skier, skiing accident.
- John Russell, 70, American actor (Rio Bravo, Pale Rider, The Outlaw Josey Wales), emphysema.
- Roy Weatherly, 75, American baseball player (Cleveland Indians, New York Yankees, New York Giants).

=== 20 ===
- Irv Brenner, 77, American basketball player.
- Joseph Carroll, 80, American general, Alzheimer's disease.
- Harry Giese, 87, German actor and narrator.
- Louis Hardiquest, 80, Belgian cyclist.
- Herbie Lewis, 85, Canadian ice hockey player (Detroit Cougars/Falcons/Red Wings).
- Owen Madden, 74, Irish footballer.
- Frank Pfütze, 32, German Olympic swimmer (1976, 1980), heart failure.
- Louis Seigner, 87, French actor, house fire.
- James Stewart, 84, American Olympic athlete (1928).
- Stan Szelest, 48, American musician, heart attack.
- Alfred Wainwright, 84, British writer.
- Aldert van der Ziel, 80, Dutch physicist.

=== 21 ===
- Cornelia Aalten, 77, Dutch Olympic runner (1932).
- Muhammad Taqi Amini, 64, Indian theologian.
- John Bicknell Auden, 87, English geologist.
- Ganga Devi, 63, Indian painter.
- James W. Duckett, 79, American military academic.
- Mieczysław Gracz, 71, Polish footballer.
- Nick Gulas, 76, American professional wrestling promoter.
- Eigil Hansen, 68, Danish Olympic field hockey player (1948).
- Frank Mitchell, 85, American actor, cardiac arrest.
- Princess Ileana of Romania, 82, Romanian royal, heart attack.

=== 22 ===
- Kenos Aroi, 48, Nauruan politician, president (1989).
- Robert Choquette, 85, Canadian novelist.
- Les Gore, 77, English footballer.
- Arnholdt Kongsgaard, 76, Norwegian skier and Olympian (1936).
- Kristo Kono, 83, Albanian composer.
- An Yeong-sik, 62-63, South Korean Olympic basketball player (1956).

=== 23 ===
- Northrop Frye, 78, Canadian literary critic and theorist.
- Herbert Fröhlich, 85, German-British physicist.
- Percy Furler, 86, Australian rules footballer.
- Ester Graff, 93, Danish feminist and businesswoman.
- Václav Janeček, 61, Czechoslovak Olympic sprinter (1952, 1956).
- Annie Markart, 83, German actress.
- P. Padmarajan, 45, Indian film maker, screenwriter and author, cardiac arrest.
- Nikolai Talyzin, 61, Soviet economist.
- Luis Hernán Álvarez, 52, Chilean footballer, stomach cancer.

=== 24 ===
- Rūdolfs Bārda, 87, Latvian Olympic footballer (1924).
- Tom Becker, 67, American basketball player.
- Everett Freeman, 79, American screenwriter.
- John M. Kelly, 59, Irish politician, heart attack.
- John Middleton, 84, British Olympic racing cyclist (1928).
- Sarashi Ranjan Mukherjee, 71, Indian surgeon and a neurobiologist.
- Jack Schaefer, 83, American writer, heart failure.
- Sensitive Prince, 15, American thoroughbred racehorse.

=== 25 ===
- Ern Aitchison, 85, Australian rules footballer.
- Lilian Bond, 83, English-American actress, heart attack.
- Stanley Brock, 59, American actor (Days of Our Lives, UHF, He's the Mayor), heart attack.
- Diana Turbay Castillo, 40, Colombian journalist, shot.
- Hoot Evers, 69, American baseball player, heart attack.
- Per Gjelten, 63, Norwegian Olympic skier (1952).
- Ismail Marjan, 70, Singaporean badminton player.
- Lafran Pane, 69, Indonesian academic, traffic collision.
- Gino Pollini, 88, Italian architect.
- Frank Soo, 76, English footballer, dementia.

=== 26 ===
- Wilbur Fox, 72, American basketball player.
- Des Koch, 58, American Olympic discus thrower (1956).
- Glenn Langan, 73, American actor, lymphoma.
- Orestes López, 82, Cuban musician.
- Hans Strååt, 73, Swedish actor.
- Johnny van Doorn, 46, Dutch writer, cancer.
- Karen Young, 39, American disco singer, peptic ulcer bleeding.

=== 27 ===
- Zheng Dongguo, 88, Chinese National Revolutionary Army officer.
- George Hazelwood Locket, 90, British arachnologist.
- Dale Long, 64, American baseball player, cancer.
- Miroslav Válek, 63, Czechoslovak poet and politician.
- Leif Wikström, 72, Swedish Olympic sailor (1956).

=== 28 ===
- Red Grange, 87, American Hall of Fame gridiron football player (Chicago Bears), Parkinson's disease.
- Christopher Jackman, 74, American politician.
- Nikola Radović, 57, Yugoslav football player and Olympian (1956).
- Richard Earl Robinson, 87, American district judge (United States District Court for the District of Nebraska).
- Alexander M. Schmidt, 61, American physician and government official, coronary artery disease.

=== 29 ===
- Jal Cursetji, 71, Indian naval admiral.
- Ingebrigt Davik, 65, Norwegian children's writer, singer and songwriter..
- Hasan Dosti, 96, Albanian politician.
- Joan Gilbert, 84, English broadcaster.
- Yasushi Inoue, 83, Japanese writer.
- Władysław Król, 83, Polish Olympic ice hockey player (1936), and football player, football player and coach.
- V. N. Navaratnam, 61, Sri Lankan politician, heart attack.
- Arne Robertsson, 48, Swedish wrestler and Olympian.
- Joe Stynes, 88, Irish footballer.

=== 30 ===
- John Bardeen, 82, American physicist, Nobel Prize recipient (1956, 1972), heart attack.
- Lemoine Batson, 92, American Olympic ski jumper (1924).
- Kurt Bittel, 83, German prehistorian.
- Clifton C. Edom, 83, American photojournalist.
- Marcel Galey, 85, French footballer.
- Rhys Lloyd, Baron Lloyd of Kilgerran, 83, Welsh politician.
- John McIntire, 83, American actor (Wagon Train, Psycho, Turner & Hooch), lung cancer.
- José Ferrater Mora, 78, Spanish philosopher, heart attack.

=== 31 ===
- Robert J. Havighurst, 90, American chemist, Alzheimer's disease.
- Márcio Melo, 84, Brazilian politician.
- Kostas Mountakis, 64, Greek musician.
- Åge Rønning, 65, Norwegian writer and journalist.
- Justin Apostol, 69, Romanian football player.
