= Canada at the 1936 Winter Olympics =

- IOC code: CAN
- NOC: Canadian Olympic Committee
- Website: www.olympic.ca (in English and French)

in Garmisch-Partenkirchen
- Competitors: 29 (22 men, 7 women) in 7 sports
- Flag bearer: Walter Kitchen
- Medals Ranked 9th: Gold 0 Silver 1 Bronze 0 Total 1

Winter Olympics appearances (overview)
- 1924; 1928; 1932; 1936; 1948; 1952; 1956; 1960; 1964; 1968; 1972; 1976; 1980; 1984; 1988; 1992; 1994; 1998; 2002; 2006; 2010; 2014; 2018; 2022; 2026

Canada competed at the 1936 Winter Olympics in Garmisch-Partenkirchen, Germany. Canada has competed at every Winter Olympic Games. Canadian Olympic Committee secretary-treasurer Fred Marples served as head of mission for the Canadian delegation to the Olympics and oversaw all travel arrangements. Amateur Athletic Union of Canada president W. A. Fry self-published a book covering Canadian achievements at the 1936 Winter Olympics and 1936 Summer Olympics. His 1936 book, Canada at eleventh Olympiad 1936 in Germany : Garmisch-Partenkirchen, February 6th to 13th, Berlin, August 1st to 16th, was printed by the Dunnville Chronicle presses and subtitled an official report of the Canadian Olympic Committee. He wrote that Canadians did very well at the 1936 Olympic games despite having one-tenth of the population of other countries. He opined that the length of the Canadian winter negatively affected summer training, and that Canadian athletes were underfunded compared to other countries.

== Medalists ==
Medal	Name	Sport	Event
Silver	Canada men's national ice hockey team (Port Arthur Bearcats): Maxwell Deacon; Hugh Farquharson; Kenneth Farmer; James Haggarty; Walter Kitchen; Raymond Milton; Francis Moore; Herman Murray; Arthur Nash; David Neville; Alexander Sinclair; Ralph St. Germain; Bill Thomson	Ice hockey	Men's competition

== Alpine skiing ==
Men

Athlete	Event	Downhill		Slalom			Total	
Athlete	Event	Time	Rank	Time 1	Time 2	Rank	Total points	Rank
Bud Clark	Combined	7:29.0	47	2:03.9 (+0:06)	DSQ	–	DNF	–
William Ball	Combined	6:40.6	39	2:07.7	DSQ	–	DNF	–
Karl Johan Baadsvik	Combined	5:55.2	26	1:54.3	DSQ	–	DNF	–

Women

Athlete	Event	Downhill		Slalom			Total	
Athlete	Event	Time	Rank	Time 1	Time 2	Rank	Total points	Rank
Diana Gordon-Lennox	Combined	8:03.8	32	2:26.2	2:04.8	28	57:68	29
Marion Miller	Combined	7:30.4	29	2:24.7	2:28.7	29	58.01	28
Edwina Chamier	Combined	7:21.0	26	2:30.1	DSQ	–	DNF	–
Lois Butler	Combined	6:20.0	18	1:54.4 (+0:12)	1:45.9	19	72.31	15

== Cross-country skiing ==
Men

Event	Athlete	Race	
Event	Athlete	Time	Rank
18 km	Karl Johan Baadsvik	1'39:30	64
18 km	Tom Mobraaten	1'33:28	57
18 km	William Ball	1'32:46	54
18 km	Bud Clark	1'30:20	47

== Figure skating ==
Men

Athlete	Event	CF	FS	Places	Points	Final rank
Montgomery Wilson	Men's singles	4	5	30	394.5	4

Women

Athlete	Event	CF	FS	Places	Points	Final rank
Constance Wilson-Samuel	Women's singles	DNS	–	–	–	–

Pairs

Athletes	Points	Score	Final rank
Audrey Garland; Fraser Sweatman	105	8.7	12
Louise Bertram; Stewart Reburn	68.5	9.8	6

== Ice hockey ==
=== Group A ===
Top two teams advanced to semifinals

	Pld	W	L	T	GF	GA	Pts
Canada	3	3	0	0	24	3	6
Austria	3	2	1	0	11	7	4
Poland	3	1	2	0	11	12	2
Latvia	3	0	3	0	3	27	0

6 February	Canada	8-1 (5-0,2-1,1-0)	Poland
7 February	Canada	11-0 (2-0,3-0,6-0)	Latvia
8 February	Canada	5-2 (4-0,1-2,0-0)	Austria

=== Group A ===
Top two teams advanced to Medal Round

	Pld	W	L	T	GF	GA	Pts
Great Britain	3	2	0	1	8	3	5
Canada	3	2	1	0	22	4	4
Germany	3	1	1	1	5	8	3
Hungary	3	0	3	0	2	22	0

11 February	Great Britain	2-1 (1-1,0-0,1-0)	Canada
12 February	Canada	15-0 (3-0,9-0,3-0)	Hungary
13 February	Germany	2-6 (0-1,0-3,2-2)	Canada

=== Medal Round ===
	Pld	W	L	T	GF	GA	Pts
Great Britain	3	2	0	1	7	1	5
Canada (silver)	3	2	1	0	9	2	4
United States	3	1	1	1	2	1	3
Czechoslovakia	3	0	3	0	0	14	0

Relevant results from the semifinal were carried over to the final

11 February	Great Britain	2-1 (1-1, 0-0, 1-0)	Canada
15 February	Canada	7-0 (3-0,3-0,1-0)	Czechoslovakia
16 February	Canada	1-0 (1-0,0-0,0-0)	United States

=== Top scorer ===
Team	GP	G	A	Pts
(Canada) Hugh Farquharson	8	11	8	19

Silver:
Canada
Francis Moore
Arthur Nash
Herman Murray
Walter Kitchen
Raymond Milton
David Neville
Kenneth Farmer
Hugh Farquharson
Maxwell Deacon
Alexander Sinclair
Bill Thomson
James Haggarty
Ralph St. Germain

Canada was represented by the 1935 Allan Cup runners-up Port Arthur Bearcats, as the Allan Cup champion Halifax Wolverines (and their league) had disbanded.

== Nordic combined ==
Events:

- 18 km cross-country skiing
- normal hill ski jumping

The cross-country skiing part of this event was combined with the main medal event of cross-country skiing. Those results can be found above in this article in the cross-country skiing section. Some athletes (but not all) entered in both the cross-country skiing and Nordic combined event, their time on the 18 km was used for both events.

The ski jumping (normal hill) event was held separate from the main medal event of ski jumping, results can be found in the table below.

Athlete	Event	Cross-country			Ski Jumping				Total	
Athlete	Event	Time	Points	Rank	Distance 1	Distance 2	Total points	Rank	Points	Rank
Karl Johan Baadsvik	Individual	1'39:30	115.2	47	49.0	46.0	191.7	14	306.9	41
Tom Mobraaten	Individual	1'33:28	143.8	41	49.0	52.5	205.0	6	348.8	31
William Ball	Individual	1'32:46	147.3	39	40.5	36.0	97.4	46	244.7	46
Bud Clark	Individual	1'30:20	159.3	33	36.5	35.0	156.1	41	315.4	39

== Ski jumping ==
Athlete	Event	Jump 1			Jump 2			Total	
Athlete	Event	Distance	Points	Rank	Distance	Points	Rank	Points	Rank
Norman Gagne	Normal hill	58.0	87.7	42	57.0	89.6	37	177.3	38
Karl Johan Baadsvik	Normal hill	63.5	94.8	36	59.0	92.3	35	187.1	35
Tom Mobraaten	Normal hill	71.5	103.5	15	66.5	103.4	18	206.9	14

== Speed skating ==
Men

Event	Athlete	Race	
Event	Athlete	Time	Rank
500 m	Tommy White	49.6	31
1500 m	Tommy White	2:34.2	34
5000 m	Tommy White	9:04.5	25
10,000 m	Tommy White	18:25.3	21

== Official outfitter ==
- HBC was the official outfitter of clothing for members of the Canadian Olympic team.

== Sources ==
- von le Fort, Peter, ed. (1936). IV. Olympische Winterspiele 1936 Amtlicher Bericht (PDF) (in German). Berlin: Reichssportverlag. Archived from the original (PDF) on 2007-08-09.
- Olympic Winter Games 1936, full results by sports-reference.com
