= Ski jumping at the 1936 Winter Olympics =

Ski jumping at the IV Olympic Winter Games
- Venue: Große Olympiaschanze
- Dates: 16 February 1936
- Competitors: 50 from 15 nations
- Winning Score: 232.0

Medalists
1st place, gold medalist(s)		Birger Ruud	Norway
2nd place, silver medalist(s)		Sven Eriksson	Sweden
3rd place, bronze medalist(s)		Reidar Andersen	Norway

At the 1936 Winter Olympics, one individual ski jumping event was contested. It was held on Sunday, 16 February 1936.

== Medalists ==
Event	Gold	Silver	Bronze
individual	Birger Ruud; Norway	Sven Eriksson; Sweden	Reidar Andersen; Norway

== Results ==
The competition took place at "Olympiaschanze" with a K-point of 80 metres. It started at 11 a.m. The weather conditions were good with temperatures between 0° to 3° Celsius and no wind.

The 80 metres were not reached due to difficult snow conditions, so the winner's lengths were 74.5 meters and 75 meters respectively. The second placed Sven Eriksson was able to stand 76 metres twice. In the second run Shinji Tatsuta reached 77 metres but was not able to stand his jump. Four jumpers fell Goro Adachi in the second run after a very attractive performance in the first heat. Shinji Tatsuta and Sauli Pälli fell in both runs, and Mario Bonomo was the only competitor who did not finish the contest after his fall in the first run.

The three judges, G. Schmidt (Germany), J. Asp (Norway), and R. Straumann (Switzerland), decided that Birger Ruud presented the most sophisticated style.

Place	No.	Competitor	Lengths	Distance Points	Judges Style Points			Total
1	34	Birger Ruud (NOR)	75.0; 74.5	118.5	18.0; 19.5	18.0; 19.0	19.5; 19.5	232.0
2	40	Sven Eriksson (SWE)	76.0; 76.0	120.0	18.5; 18.0	18.5; 19.0	18.5; 18.0	230.5
3	45	Reidar Andersen (NOR)	74.0; 75.0	118.4	18.5; 18.5	18.5; 19.0	17.5; 18.5	228.9
4	9	Kaare Wahlberg (NOR)	73.5; 72.0	115.5	19.0; 18.5	17.5; 18.5	19.0; 19.0	227.0
5	46	Stanisław Marusarz (POL)	73.0; 75.5	117.6	17.0; 16.5	17.5; 18.0	17.0; 18.0	221.6
6	25	Lauri Valonen (FIN)	73.5; 67.0	111.9	17.5; 17.5	18.5; 18.0	19.0; 17.0	219.4
7	39	Masaji Iguro (JPN)	74.5; 72.5	116.7	16.5; 17.5	17.5; 18.5	14.5; 17.0	218.2
8	22	Arnholdt Kongsgaard (NOR)	74.5; 66.0	112.2	17.5; 17.5	17.5; 18.0	17.5; 17.5	217.7
9	13	Väinö Tiihonen (FIN)	71.5; 70.0	112.8	17.5; 17.0	17.0; 17.5	16.5; 17.0	215.3
10	21	Hans Marr (GER)	71.5; 69.0	112.2	17.0; 17.5	17.0; 18.0	16.0; 16.5	214.2
11	32	Sverre Fredheim (USA)	73.5; 73.0	116.1	17.0; 16.0	16.5; 16.5	16.0; 16.0	214.1
12	44	Kurt Körner (GER)	70.0; 71.5	112.8	16.0; 15.5	16.5; 17.0	16.5; 15.0	209.3
13	43	Caspar Oimoen (USA)	71.5; 72.5	114.6	13.0; 16.5	15.5; 17.0	15.0; 16.0	207.6
14	28	Tormod Mobraaten (CAN)	71.5; 66.5	110.4	14.0; 15.0	16.5; 16.5	16.0; 18.5	206.9
15	4	Sixten Johansson (SWE)	63.0; 66.0	104.1	18.0; 17.5	15.5; 17.0	15.0; 15.0	206.1
16	17	Nils Hjelmström (SWE)	68.0; 62.5	105.3	18.0; 17.0	16.0; 16.0	16.5; 16.0	204.8
17	33	Franz Haslberger (GER)	64.0; 67.0	105.6	17.0; 17.0	16.0; 17.0	15.5; 16.5	204.6
18	8	Paul Kraus (GER)	62.5; 62.5	101.4	17.5; 18.0	16.0; 17.0	17.5; 17.0	204.4
19	11	Richard Bühler (SUI)	63.0; 63.0	102.0	17.0; 16.5	16.5; 16.5	17.5; 18.0	204.0
19	31	Josef Bradl (AUT)	64.0; 70.5	108.0	16.0; 16.0	16.0; 17.5	15.0; 15.5	204.0
21	23	Andrzej Marusarz (POL)	66.0; 66.0	106.2	16.5; 16.5	15.0; 15.5	18.0; 16.0	203.7
22	29	Axel Östrand (SWE)	61.0; 68.0	104.4	16.5; 16.5	16.0; 17.0	15.5; 17.5	203.4
23	7	Roy Mikkelsen (USA)	69.5; 68.0	110.1	16.5; 15.5	15.5; 15.0	14.5; 15.5	202.6
24	50	Timo Murama (FIN)	71.0; 70.0	112.2	14.0; 15.0	15.5; 15.5	15.0; 15.0	202.2
25	6	Hans Mariacher (AUT)	65.5; 69.0	108.0	17.0; 16.5	15.0; 15.5	15.5; 14.0	201.5
26	19	Rudolf Rieger (AUT)	68.0; 67.5	108.9	16.0; 15.0	16.0; 15.0	16.0; 13.5	200.4
27	30	Jaroslav Lukeš (TCH)	69.0; 71.0	111.6	14.0; 15.0	15.5; 15.0	14.5; 13.5	199.1
28	47	Marcel Raymond (SUI)	64.0; 68.5	106.8	14.0; 14.0	16.0; 16.5	14.5; 15.5	197.3
29	18	Josef Kahl (TCH)	64.0; 64.5	104.1	15.0; 16.0	15.5; 15.0	16.0; 14.5	196.1
30	20	Walter Bietila (USA)	66.5; 63.5	104.7	16.0; 14.0	15.0; 15.0	16.0; 14.5	195.2
31	2	Iwao Miyajima (JPN)	63.5; 63.5	102.6	16.0; 16.5	14.5; 15.5	14.0; 15.5	194.6
32	41	Johann Lahr (TCH)	64.5; 66.0	105.3	13.0; 15.0	15.5; 15.0	14.0; 16.0	193.8
33	35	Bronisław Czech (POL)	62.5; 63.5	102.0	15.0; 16.0	16.0; 16.0	13.5; 14.5	193.0
34	36	Reto Badrutt (SUI)	64.5; 65.0	104.7	15.0; 14.5	15.5; 15.0	13.0; 13.5	191.2
35	3	Karl Baadsvik (CAN)	63.5; 59.0	99.6	15.0; 15.0	13.5; 14.0	15.0; 15.0	187.1
36	42	Franz Aschenwald (AUT)	64.5; 55.5	98.1	14.5; 14.5	16.0; 14.5	14.0; 14.0	185.6
37	10	Bruno Da Col (ITA)	59.0; 61.0	98.1	13.0; 13.0	13.0; 15.0	13.5; 14.0	179.6
38	16	Norman Gagne (CAN)	58.0; 57.0	94.8	14.0; 15.0	12.0; 12.5	14.0; 15.0	177.3
39	38	Franc Pribošek (YUG)	59.0; 55.0	93.9	14.0; 14.5	12.5; 13.0	13.0; 15.0	175.9
40	5	Oldřich Buďárek (TCH)	59.0; 62.0	98.7	12.0; 12.0	12.0; 14.0	13.0; 12.5	174.2
41	1	Albin Novšak (YUG)	54.0; 58.5	93.0	14.0; 13.0	12.5; 12.0	14.5; 15.0	174.0
41	49	Hubert Clompe (ROU)	58.0; 59.0	96.0	14.5; 12.0	12.0; 13.0	14.0; 12.5	174.0
43	26	Franc Palme (YUG)	61.0; 55.0	95.4	13.0; 12.0	12.0; 11.0	13.0; 12.5	168.9
44	14	Albin Jakopič (YUG)	52.0; 53.0	87.6	10.0; 11.0	11.0; 11.0	13.5; 12.0	156.1
45	27	Goro Adachi (JPN)	73.0; 71.0	84.3	17.0; 6.0	16.0; 5.0	16.5; 4.0	150.8
46	15	Shinji Tatsuta (JPN)	73.5; 77.0	58.2	7.0; 8.0	5.0; 10.0	5.0; 8.0	101.2
47	37	Sauli Pälli (FIN)	71.0; 68.5	51.3	5.0; 5.0	7.0; 5.0	4.0; 3.0	80.3
–	24	Mario Bonomo (ITA)	Fall -	-	- -	- -	- -	DNF
–	12	Levente Balatoni (HUN)	- -	-	- -	- -	- -	DNS
–	48	Sándor Darabos (HUN)	- -	-	- -	- -	- -	DNS

== Participating nations ==
A total of 48 ski jumpers from 14 nations competed at the Garmisch-Partenkirchen Games:

- Austria (4)
- Canada (3)
- Czechoslovakia (4)
- Finland (4)
- Germany (4)
- Italy (2)
- Japan (4)
- Norway (4)
- Poland (3)
- Romania (1)
- Sweden (4)
- Switzerland (3)
- United States (4)
- Yugoslavia (4)
