= Planica 1941 =

Coordinates: 46°28′43″N 13°43′16″E

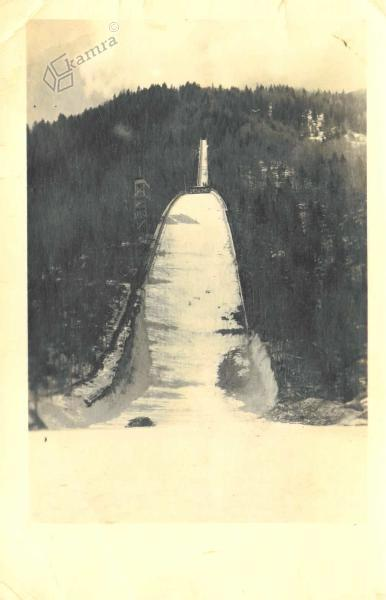
- Host city: Planica, Kingdom of Yugoslavia
- Sport: Ski flying
- Events: Ski Flying Study Week
- Main venue: Bloudkova velikanka K120

Planica 1941 was a ski flying study week, allowed only in study purposes, with main competition held on 2 March 1941 in Planica, Drava Banovina, Kingdom of Yugoslavia. Around 15,000 people gathered for the competition, which was used as a propaganda tool by the Nazi regime. Two world records were set, including a 118-metre (387 ft) jump which stood until 1948.

== Schedule ==
Date	Event	Rounds	Longest jump of the day	Visitors
26 February 1941	Official training 1	4	98 metres (322 ft) by Heinz Palme	N/A
27 February 1941	Official training 2	5	101 metres (331 ft) by Heinz Palme; 103 metres (338 ft) by Heini Klopfer (fall); 101 metres (331 ft) by Paul Krauß	N/A
28 February 1941	Official training 3	5	106 metres (348 ft) by Paul Krauß; 106 metres (348 ft) by Rudi Gering	N/A
2 March 1941	Morning interns	1	94 metres (308 ft) by Rudi Gering; 98 metres (321 ft) by Gregor Höll (fall)	15,000
2 March 1941	International event	3	118 metres (387 ft) by Rudi Gering (WR)	15,000

== Background ==
An enormous ski jump was built in 1933 in Planica in the Kingdom of Yugoslavia, at which a dozen world records were set in the mid-1930s. While occupying Yugoslavia during World War II, the Nazi regime enlarged the course to make it possible to set new records for propaganda purposes. A competition was held in 1941, which notably excluded the top Norwegian skiers.

== All jumps over 105 metres ==
Chronological order:

- 106 metres (348 ft) – 28 February – Paul Krauß (4RD, Training 3)
- 106 metres (348 ft) – 28 February – Rudi Gering (4RD, Training 3)
- 108 metres (354 ft) – 2 March – Rudi Gering (WR, 2RD, Competition)
- 105 metres (344 ft) – 2 March – Paul Krauß (fall, 2Rd, Competition)
- 109 metres (358 ft) – 2 March – Heinz Palme (WR fall, 3RD, Competition)
- 118 metres (387 ft) – 2 March – Rudi Gering (WR, 3RD, Competition)
- 111 metres (364 ft) – 2 March – Hans Lahr (3RD, Competition)
- 112 metres (367 ft) – 2 March – Paul Krauß (3RD, Competition)
- 109 metres (358 ft) – 2 March – Franz Mair (fall, 3RD, Competition)

== Competition ==
On 26 February 1941, the first official training day was held. Rudi Finžgar set the Yugoslavian record at 93 metres (305 ft) and the longest jump of the day was set by German Heinz Palme at 98 metres (322 ft).

On 27 February 1841, at the second official training, Heini Klopfer crashed at 93 metres (305 ft), the distance of the day, and Paul Krauß set the longest standing jump at 101 metres (331 ft).

On 28 February 1941, at the third official training, there were a total of 18 jumps which exceeded one hundred metres. Krauß and Gering both landed at 106 metres (348 ft), just under the world record.

There were no jumps on 1 March, during which the hill was repaired and prepared for the next day's competition.

On 2 March, a large crowd had arrived for the competition. The International Ski Federation (FIS) was very reserved toward ski flying and the dangers involved in establishing world records, and endorsed the competition for study purposes only. People have seen total of 49 jumps and two world records.

Competition was scheduled in two parts: morning interns and an afternoon round for records hunting. The run experienced melting from strong sunlight and only 17 competitors were able to complete morning runs (8 Germans and 9 Yugoslavians).

By 2 pm conditions had changed, the inrun froze and the course speed increased. After two scheduled rounds and Gering's world record distance at 108 metres (354 ft), organizers wished to end the event for safety concerns, but it continued on Germany's request. The fourth and final round had a series of great jumps: Heinz Palme reached 109 metres (358 ft) but a ground touch invalidated this for a world record distance. Then Rudi Gering set the world record at 118 metres (387 ft), winning the official afternoon competition in the best jump battle. Other jumps were Hans Lahr (111 m), Paul Krauß (112 m) and Franz Mair (109 m with fall).

=== First official training ===
26 February 1941 – chronological order not available

Bib	Name	Country	Round 1	Round 2	Round 3	Round 4
Morning jumps
N/A	Rudi Finžgar	Kingdom of Yugoslavia	68 m	—	—	
N/A	Gregor Klančnik	Kingdom of Yugoslavia	72 m	—	—	—
N/A	Nedog	Kingdom of Yugoslavia	68.5 m	—	—	—
N/A	Albin Novšak	Kingdom of Yugoslavia	65 m	—	—	—
N/A	Franc Pribošek	Kingdom of Yugoslavia	70 m	—	—	—
N/A	Janko Mežik	Kingdom of Yugoslavia	58 m	—	—	—
N/A	Jože Zalokar	Kingdom of Yugoslavia	54 m	—	—	—
Afternon jumps, 14:00 pm
N/A	Rudi Finžgar	Kingdom of Yugoslavia	85 m	93 m	—	—
N/A	Franc Pribošek	Kingdom of Yugoslavia	69 m	—	—	—
N/A	Janko Mežik	Kingdom of Yugoslavia	72 m	77 m	—	—
N/A	Nedog	Kingdom of Yugoslavia	73 m	—	—	—
N/A	Jože Zalokar	Kingdom of Yugoslavia	71 m	—	—	—
N/A	Franz Mair	Nazi Germany	75.5 m	88 m	90 m	—
N/A	Heinz Palme	Nazi Germany	92 m	90 m	98 m	97 m
N/A	Hans Lahr	Nazi Germany	84 m	92.5 m	95 m	95 m
N/A	Rudi Gering	Nazi Germany	73 m	83 m	92 m	92 m
N/A	Heini Klopfer	Nazi Germany	82 m	95 m	79.5 m	—
N/A	Paul Krauß	Nazi Germany	87 m	93 m	97 m	94 m

=== Second official training ===
27 February 1941 – chronological order not available

Bib	Name	Country	Round 1	Round 2	Round 3	Round 4	Round 5
N/A	Albin Novšak	Kingdom of Yugoslavia	50 m	81 m	81 m	85 m	86 m
N/A	Gregor Klančnik	Kingdom of Yugoslavia	61 m	69 m	84 m	—	—
N/A	Franc Pribošek	Kingdom of Yugoslavia	60 m	75 m	—	—	—
N/A	Rudi Finžgar	Kingdom of Yugoslavia	82 m	—	—	—	—
N/A	Janko Mežik	Kingdom of Yugoslavia	72 m	80 m	—	—	—
N/A	Tone Razingar	Kingdom of Yugoslavia	52 m	50 m	51 m	70 m	—
N/A	Jože Zalokar	Kingdom of Yugoslavia	58 m	52 m	71 m	73 m	—
N/A	Zupan	Kingdom of Yugoslavia	62 m	63 m	79 m	82 m	—
N/A	Franz Mair	Nazi Germany	83 m	81 m	81 m	—	—
N/A	Heinz Palme	Nazi Germany	90 m	100 m	101 m	—	—
N/A	Hans Lahr	Nazi Germany	92 m	99 m	98 m	—	—
N/A	Paul Schneidenbach	Nazi Germany	75 m	85 m	93 m	91 m	—
N/A	Rudi Gering	Nazi Germany	85 m	96 m	99 m	97 m	—
N/A	Heini Klopfer	Nazi Germany	93 m	100 m	94 m	103 m	—
N/A	Paul Krauß	Nazi Germany	96 m	99 m	99.5 m	101 m	—
N/A	Gregor Höll	Nazi Germany	72 m	82 m	—	—	—

=== Third official training ===
13:00 pm – 28 February 1941 – chronological order

Bib	Name	Country	Round 1	Round 2	Round 3	Round 4	Round 5
1	Gregor Höll	Nazi Germany	102 m	94 m	—	—	—
2	Heinz Palme	Nazi Germany	90 m	100 m	104 m	—	—
3	Heini Klopfer	Nazi Germany	92 m	90 m	100 m	102 m	101 m
4	Hans Lahr	Nazi Germany	98 m	103 m	101 m	—	—
5	Paul Krauß	Nazi Germany	98 m	104 m	102 m	106 m	101 m
6	Rudi Gering	Nazi Germany	97 m	102 m	104 m	106 m	—
7	Jože Javornik	Kingdom of Yugoslavia	68 m	72 m	—	—	—
8	Franc Pribošek	Kingdom of Yugoslavia	73 m	—	—	—	—
9	Tone Razingar	Kingdom of Yugoslavia	63 m	69 m	—	—	—
10	Nedog	Kingdom of Yugoslavia	72 m	76 m	—	—	—
11	Franz Mair	Nazi Germany	91 m	95 m	100 m	101 m	—
12	Paul Schneidenbach	Nazi Germany	88 m	98 m	93 m	101 m	—
13	Jože Zalokar	Kingdom of Yugoslavia	69 m	71 m	—	—	—
14	Albin Novšak	Kingdom of Yugoslavia	83 m	90 m	85 m	92 m	—
15	Zupan	Kingdom of Yugoslavia	87 m	85 m	96 m	—	—

=== Ski Flying Study competition ===
11:45 am – 2 March 1941 – One round – chronological order

Bib	Name	Country	Dist.
1	Albin Novšak	Kingdom of Yugoslavia	67 m
2	Heinz Palme	Nazi Germany	87 m
3	Heini Klopfer	Nazi Germany	87 m
4	Zupan	Kingdom of Yugoslavia	75 m
5	Rudi Gering	Nazi Germany	94 m
6	Paul Schneidenbach	Nazi Germany	84 m
7	Rudi Finžgar	Kingdom of Yugoslavia	71 m
8	Hans Lahr	Nazi Germany	91 m
9	Paul Krauß	Nazi Germany	94 m
10	Tone Razinger	Kingdom of Yugoslavia	63 m
11	Gregor Höll	Nazi Germany	98 m
12	Franz Mair	Nazi Germany	87 m
13	Janko Mežik	Kingdom of Yugoslavia	71 m
14	Jože Zalokar	Kingdom of Yugoslavia	76 m
15	Nedog	Kingdom of Yugoslavia	66 m
16	Franc Pribošek	Kingdom of Yugoslavia	81 m
17	Jože Javornik	Kingdom of Yugoslavia	N/A
Afternoon event; 2:00 PM, chronological
First round
1	Albin Novšak	Kingdom of Yugoslavia	86 m
2	Heinz Palme	Nazi Germany	91 m
3	Heini Klopfer	Nazi Germany	90 m
4	Zupan	Kingdom of Yugoslavia	N/A
5	Rudi Gering	Nazi Germany	98 m
6	Paul Schneidenbach	Nazi Germany	85 m
7	Rudi Finžgar	Kingdom of Yugoslavia	81 m
8	Hans Lahr	Nazi Germany	95 m
9	Paul Krauß	Nazi Germany	101 m
10	Tone Razinger	Kingdom of Yugoslavia	72 m
11	Franz Mair	Nazi Germany	100 m
12	Janko Mežik	Kingdom of Yugoslavia	87 m
13	Jože Zalokar	Kingdom of Yugoslavia	N/A
14	Nedog	Kingdom of Yugoslavia	80 m
15	Franc Pribošek	Kingdom of Yugoslavia	81 m
Second round
16	Albin Novšak	Kingdom of Yugoslavia	93 m
17	Heinz Palme	Nazi Germany	103 m
18	Heini Klopfer	Nazi Germany	101 m
19	Rudi Gering	Nazi Germany	108 m
20	Paul Schneidenbach	Nazi Germany	100 m
21	Rudi Finžgar	Kingdom of Yugoslavia	101 m
22	Hans Lahr	Nazi Germany	107 m
23	Paul Krauß	Nazi Germany	105 m
24	Franz Mair	Nazi Germany	99 m
Third round
25	Albin Novšak	Kingdom of Yugoslavia	103 m
26	Heinz Palme	Nazi Germany	109 m
27	Heini Klopfer	Nazi Germany	103 m
28	Rudi Gering	Nazi Germany	118 m
29	Paul Schneidenbach	Nazi Germany	101 m
30	Hans Lahr	Nazi Germany	111 m
31	Paul Krauß	Nazi Germany	112 m
32	Franz Mair	Nazi Germany	109 m

Not recognized. Crash at WR!
Yugoslavian national record!
World record!
Fall or touch!

== Official results ==
2 March 1941 – 2:00 pm – best jump

Rank	Name	Dist.
1	(Nazi Germany) Rudi Gering	118 m
2	(Nazi Germany) Paul Krauß	112 m
3	(Nazi Germany) Hans Lahr	111 m

== Ski flying world records ==
Date	Name	Country	Metres	Feet
2 March 1941	Rudi Gering	Nazi Germany	108	354
2 March 1941	Heinz Palme	Nazi Germany	109	358
2 March 1941	Rudi Gering	Nazi Germany	118	387

Not recognized! Touch ground at world record distance.
