= Rudi Gering =

German ski jumper

Personal information
- Nationality: Germany
- Born: 29 May 1917 Gehlberg, German Empire
- Died: 3 February 1998 (aged 80) Garmisch-Partenkirchen, Germany

Sport
- Sport: Skiing

Achievements and titles
- Personal bests: 118 m (387 ft); Planica, King. of Yugoslavia (2 March 1941)

Rudi Gering (1917–1998) was a German ski jumper. He was born in Thüringen in Germany and died somewhere in Bavaria.

== Career ==
On 2 March 1941 he set two world records on Ski Flying Study week competition in Planica. On legendary hill called Bloudkova velikanka he jumped 108 and 118 meters. (Note: Jumps in this order: Lahr (111 m), Krauß (112 m) and Mair (109 m with touch) all jumped after Gering set the world record at 118 metres.)

He was the first German world record holder and first person in history who jumped two times over 100 meters line ever. He helped at the construction of Heini-Klopfer-Skiflugschanze in Oberstdorf together with Heini Klopfer, Sepp Weiler and Toni Brutscher.

== Ski jumping world records ==
Date	Hill	Location	Metres	Feet
2 March 1941	Bloudkova velikanka K120	Planica, Kingdom of Yugoslavia	108	354
2 March 1941	Bloudkova velikanka K120	Planica, Kingdom of Yugoslavia	118	387
