= Strazne =

Strazne may refer to places:

- Strážne, a municipality and village in Slovakia
- Strážné, a municipality and village in the Czech Republic
