= David Neville =

David Neville may refer to:

- David Neville (sprinter) (born 1984), American 400m runner
- David Neville (ice hockey) (1908–1991), Canadian ice hockey player
