= Pepi Erben =

German alpine skier (1928–2025)

Personal information
- Nationality: German
- Born: 18 January 1928 Strážné, Czechoslovakia
- Died: 17 October 2025 (aged 97)

Sport
- Sport: Alpine skiing

Josef Ernst "Pepi" Erben (18 January 1928 – 17 October 2025) was a German alpine skier. He competed in two events at the 1952 Winter Olympics, finishing 47th. During the competition, he broke his leg and required medical attention. He later became a coach for Iceland and Morocco.

Erben died on 17 October 2025, at the age of 97.
