= Sven Eriksson =

Sven Eriksson may refer to:

- Sven-Göran Eriksson (1948–2024), Swedish former football manager
- Sven Selånger (1907–1992), born Sven Eriksson, Swedish Nordic skier
