= Axel Östrand =

Swedish ski jumper

Personal information
- Nationality: Swedish
- Born: 15 May 1909; Örnsköldsvik, Sweden
- Died: 11 May 2005 (aged 95); Örnsköldsvik, Sweden

Sport
- Sport: Ski jumping

Axel Östrand (15 May 1909 – 11 May 2005) was a Swedish ski jumper. He competed in the individual event at the 1936 Winter Olympics.
