= Olympic Stadium (Grenoble) =

Temporary stadium in Grenoble, France

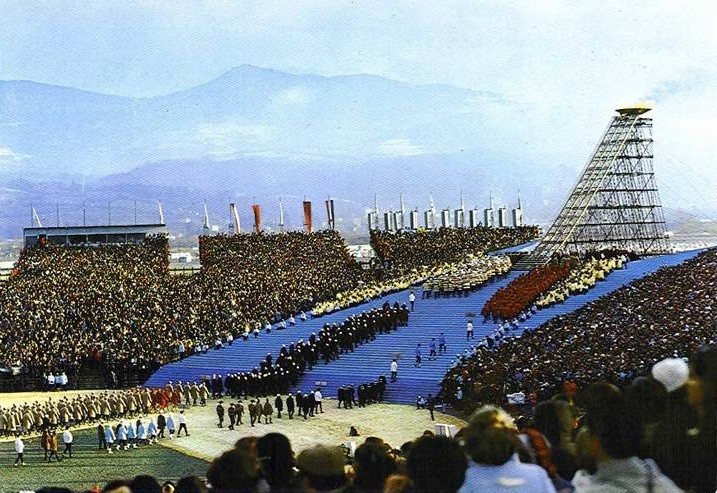
- Interactive map of Olympic Stadium
- Full name: Opening Stadium
- Location: Grenoble, France
- Coordinates: 45°09′57″N 5°43′56″E
- Capacity: 60,000

Construction
- Opened: 1968
- Demolished: 1968
- Architects: Bruno Pouradier-Duteil, Georges Pillon

Olympic Stadium, also known as Opening Stadium, was a temporary stadium in Grenoble, France. Built to only host the opening ceremonies for the 1968 Winter Olympics, the stadium was immediately disassembled following the games. The stadium held 60,000 spectators.
