= Hubert Clompe =

Romanian ski jumper

Personal information
- Nationality: Romanian
- Born: 22 July 1910; Brașov, Austria-Hungary
- Died: 30 December 1995 (aged 85); Ihringen, Germany

Sport
- Sport: Ski jumping

Hubert Clompe (22 July 1910 – 30 December 1995) was a Romanian ski jumper. He competed in the individual event at the 1936 Winter Olympics.
