= Mario Bonomo =

Italian ski jumper

Personal information
- Nationality: Italian
- Born: 25 January 1912 Asiago, Italy
- Died: 28 August 1983 (aged 71)

Sport
- Sport: Ski jumping

Mario Bonomo (25 January 1912 – 28 August 1983) was an Italian ski jumper. He competed in the individual event at the 1936 Winter Olympics.
