= Hans Mariacher =

Austrian ski jumper

Personal information
- Nationality: Austrian
- Born: 11 August 1910; Kitzbühel, Austria-Hungary
- Died: 24 June 1985 (aged 74); Kitzbühel, Austria

Sport
- Sport: Ski jumping

Hans Mariacher (11 August 1910 – 24 June 1985) was an Austrian ski jumper. He competed in the individual event at the 1936 Winter Olympics.
