= Halvor Heggtveit =

Halvor Heggtveit (March 16, 1907, in Leland, North Dakota, U.S. – January 18, 1996, in Ottawa, Ontario, Canada) of Norwegian stock and a resident of Canada since the age of five.

He attended Ottawa Collegiate Institute in Ottawa, Ontario from 1918 to 1923.

He was a long time member of Ottawa Ski Club, including club director, captain of the Traffic Corps (ski safety - ca 1940s).

Family owned "Heggtveit Sporting Goods", who were specialists in ski equipment and repairs. They were located at Albert & O'Connor in Ottawa, Ontario. Anne Heggtveit Alpine Ski gold medalist at the 1960 Winter Olympic Games was his daughter.

== Cross-Country Skiing Championships ==
In the winter of 1933–34, he made a clean sweep in the cross-country races with the championship of the Ottawa Ski Club, City of Ottawa, province of Ontario, and the Dominion Championship. He attributed his successes to one thing: training, hard and constant training.

Other highlights:

- Ontario Championship, 11 Feb 1934, Caledon(near Toronto), Ontario, won the race in 1h. 27 min. 50 sec.
- Quebec Championship, 18 Feb 1934, Shawbridge, Quebec, came first of 30 skiers with a time of 1.05.17; J. P. Taylor (2nd) 1.07.07; E. Laflamme (3rd) 1.10.13.
- Champion Ski Runner of Canada, Shawinigan Falls, Quebec, 24-25 Feb 1934, covering the eleven mile course in 1.19.52; John Pringle Taylor was only 24 seconds behind (1.20.16); Bud Clark (St. Pat's) came third, in 1.22.43.

== Olympics ==
He qualified to represent Canada in 18km Cross-Country Skiing at the 1932 Winter Olympics in Lake Placid, New York, USA. Family and business obligations precluded his participation.

== Other Sports ==
Rifle Shooting - Dominion of Canada Marksman - Gold and Silver pins. Interestingly, Halvor was a junior classmate of Desmond Burke, who in 1924 at age 19 became the youngest winner of the King's Prize.

He was a long time member of the Ottawa New Edinburgh Canoe Club (1931–1993).

== Honours ==
Ottawa Recreational Association Sports Hall of Fame - 1978 Sportsman of the Year

He was inducted into the Lisgar Collegiate Institute Athletic Wall of Fame in 2018.
