= Väinö Tiihonen =

Finnish ski jumper

Personal information
- Nationality: Finnish
- Born: 28 November 1912; Helsinki, Finland
- Died: 27 July 1957 (aged 44); Kuopio, Finland

Sport
- Sport: Ski jumping

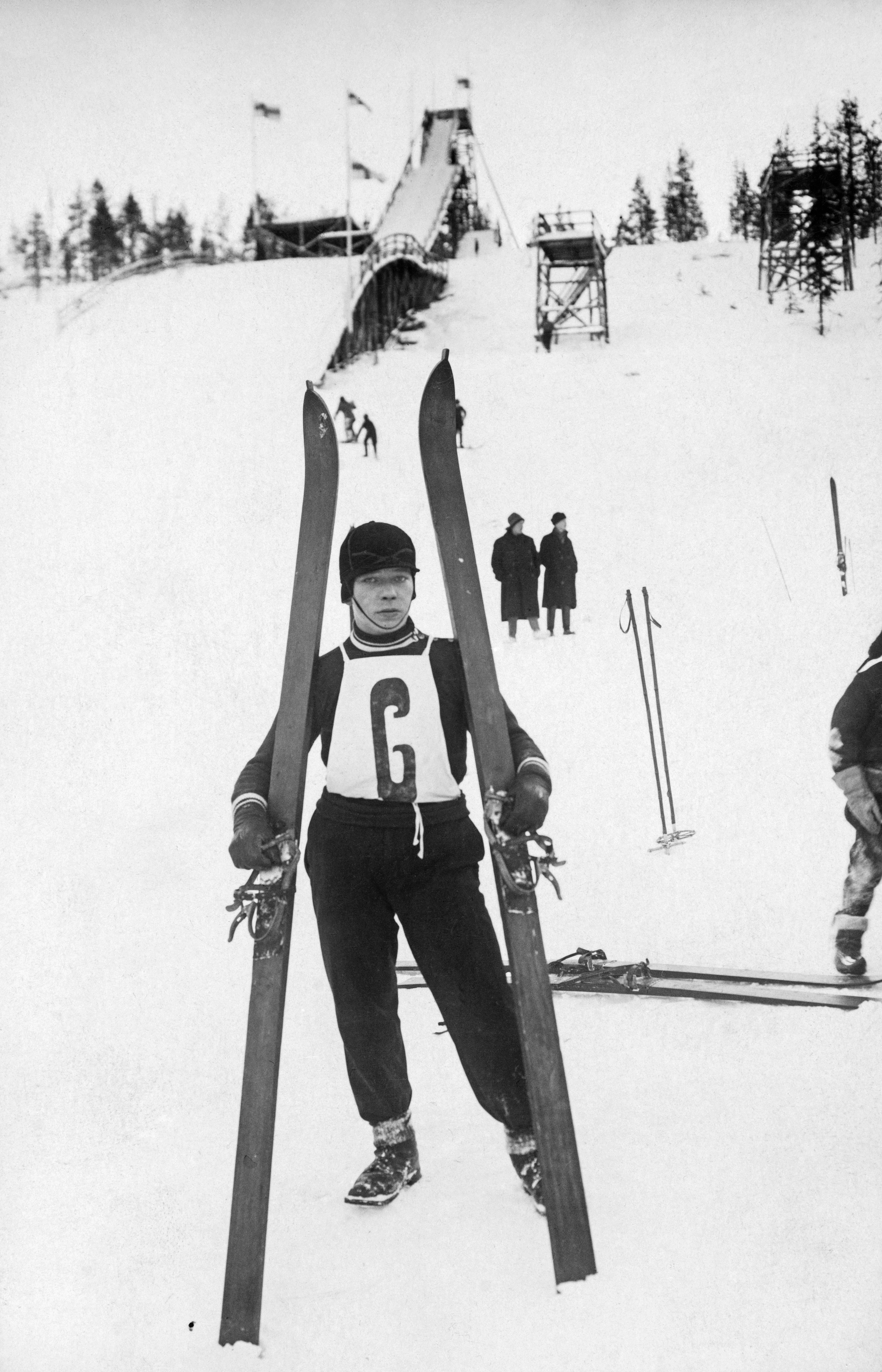
Finnish ski jumper Väinö Tiihonen in Ounasvaara on February 15, 1930.

Väinö Tiihonen (28 November 1912 – 27 July 1957) was a Finnish ski jumper. He competed in the individual event at the 1936 Winter Olympics.
