= Franz Haslberger =

German ski jumper

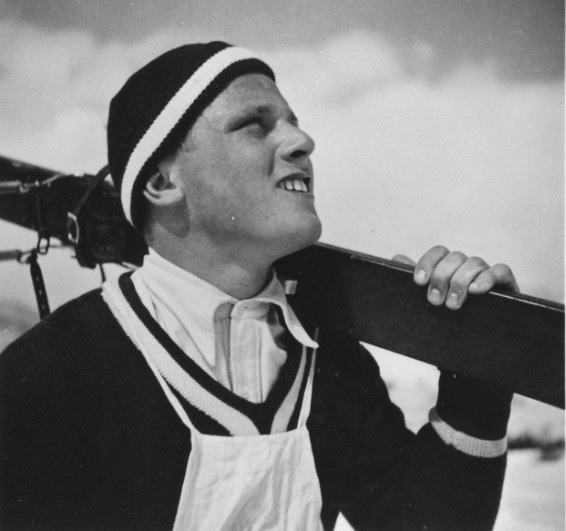

Personal information
- Nationality: German
- Born: 3 December 1914; Reit im Winkl, Germany
- Died: 19 September 1939 (aged 24); Lwów, Poland

Sport
- Sport: Ski jumping

Franz Haslberger (3 December 1914 – 19 September 1939) was a German ski jumper. He competed in the individual event at the 1936 Winter Olympics. He was killed in action during the Invasion of Poland.
