= Josef Kahl =

Czech ski jumper

Personal information
- Nationality: Czech
- Born: 31 March 1913; Harrachov, Austria-Hungary
- Died: 23 February 1942 (aged 28); Kamyschly, Russian SFSR, Soviet Union

Sport
- Sport: Ski jumping

Josef Kahl (31 March 1913 – 23 February 1942) was a Czech ski jumper. He competed in the individual event at the 1936 Winter Olympics. He was killed in action during World War II.
