= Sauli Pälli =

Finnish ski jumper

Personal information
- Nationality: Finnish
- Born: 23 September 1912; Kotka, Finland
- Died: 13 December 1960 (aged 48); Valkeakoski, Finland

Sport
- Sport: Ski jumping

Sauli Pälli (23 September 1912 – 13 December 1960) was a Finnish ski jumper. He competed in the individual event at the 1936 Winter Olympics.
