= Sixten Johansson =

Swedish ski jumper

Personal information
- Nationality: Swedish
- Born: 25 January 1910; Boden, Sweden
- Died: 13 October 1991 (aged 81); Boden, Sweden

Sport
- Sport: Ski jumping

Sixten Johansson (25 January 1910 – 13 October 1991) was a Swedish ski jumper. He competed in the individual event at the 1936 Winter Olympics.
