= Kurt Körner =

German ski jumper (1912–1949)

Personal information
- Nationality: German
- Born: 13 May 1912 Klingenthal, Germany
- Died: 1945 (aged 32–33)

Sport
- Sport: Ski jumping

Kurt Körner (13 May 1912 – 1945) was a German ski jumper. He competed in the individual event at the 1936 Winter Olympics. He was killed in action during World War II.
