= Reto Badrutt =

Swiss ski jumper

Personal information
- Nationality: Swiss
- Born: 10 July 1908
- Died: April 1974 (aged 65); Arosa, Switzerland

Sport
- Sport: Ski jumping

Reto Rudolf Badrutt (10 July 1908 – April 1974) was a Swiss ski jumper. He competed in the individual event at the 1936 Winter Olympics.
