= Iwao Miyajima =

Japanese ski jumper

Personal information
- Nationality: Japanese
- Born: 2 May 1914; Hokkaido, Japan
- Died: 21 June 2005 (aged 91)

Sport
- Sport: Ski jumping

Iwao Miyajima (2 May 1914 – 21 June 2005) was a Japanese ski jumper. He competed in the individual event at the 1936 Winter Olympics.
