= Nils Hjelmström =

Swedish ski jumper

Personal information
- Nationality: Swedish
- Born: 29 August 1915; Luleå, Sweden
- Died: 17 October 2003 (aged 88); Råneå, Sweden

Sport
- Sport: Ski jumping

Nils Hjelmström (29 August 1915 – 17 October 2003) was a Swedish ski jumper. He competed in the individual event at the 1936 Winter Olympics.
