= Anne Heggtveit =

Canadian alpine ski racer

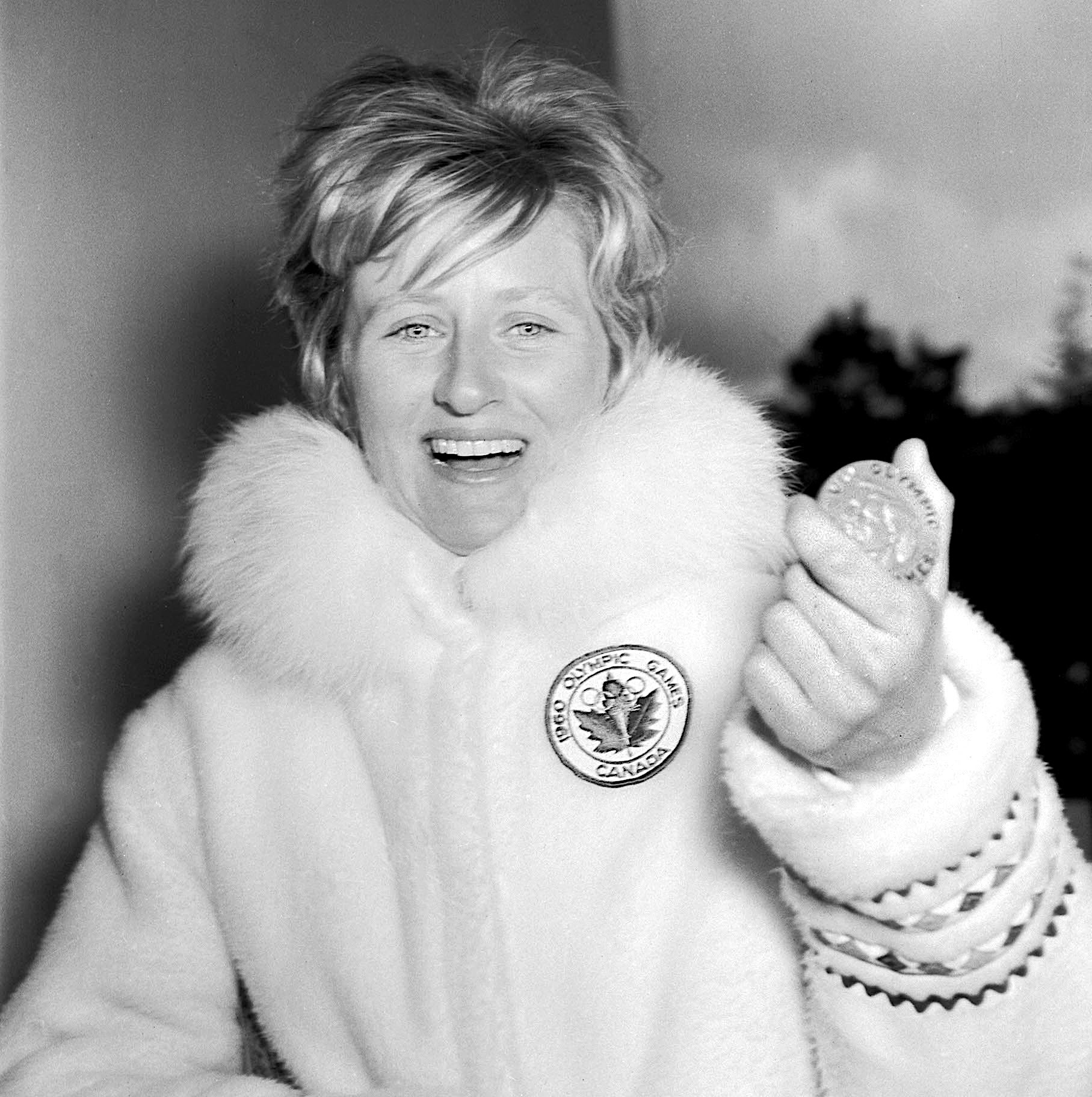
- Heggtveit with her Olympic gold medal

Personal information
- Born: January 11, 1939 (age 87) Ottawa, Ontario, Canada
- Height: 5 ft 3 in (1.60 m)

Skiing career
- Sport: Alpine skiing ♀
- Club: Ottawa Ski Club
- Disciplines: Downhill; Giant slalom; Slalom; Combined

Olympics
- Teams: 2 – (1956, 1960)
- Medals: 1 (1 gold)

World Championships
- Teams: 4 – (1954, 1956, 1958, 1960) includes two Olympics
- Medals: 2 (2 gold)
Medal record
Women's alpine skiing
Representing Canada
Olympic Games
Gold medal – first place	1960 Squaw Valley	Slalom
World Championships
Gold medal – first place	1960 Squaw Valley	Combined

Anne Heggtveit, CM (born January 11, 1939) is a former alpine ski racer from Canada. She was an Olympic gold medallist and double world champion in 1960.

== Early years ==
Born in Ottawa, Ontario, Heggtveit was raised in New Edinburgh, one of the oldest neighbourhoods in the city. Her father, Halvor Heggtveit (1907–1996), was born in Leland, North Dakota, to Norwegian immigrant parents who had emigrated to the United States through Ellis Island. He later moved to Ottawa, where he became a Canadian cross-country skiing champion, winning the national championship in 1934. He was selected for the Canadian team at the 1932 Winter Olympics in Lake Placid, New York, but did not compete.

Her mother, Doll Clark, was Canadian. Her maternal uncle, William George "Bud" Clark (1910–1975), was also a Canadian champion skier who represented Canada at the 1932 Winter Olympics and 1936 Winter Olympics. Clark later served as president of the Canadian Amateur Ski Association from 1952 to 1959 and was inducted into the Canadian Ski Hall of Fame in 1982.

Heggtveit began skiing at the age of two, encouraged by her father. Her mother prepared a small ski hill in the backyard of their New Edinburgh home, while her paternal uncle, Bruce Heggtveit, made her first pair of skis. She later trained at Camp Fortune in the Gatineau Hills of Quebec, northwest of Ottawa, and attended Lisgar Collegiate Institute.

Heggtveit demonstrated considerable skiing ability from an early age. In 1947, at the age of eight, she served as a forerunner at an international downhill and slalom competition in Lake Placid, New York.

== Racing career ==
At the age of 15 in 1954, Heggtveit first gained international attention when she became the youngest winner ever of the Holmenkollen giant slalom event in Norway. She also won the slalom and giant slalom at the United States national junior championships, and finished ninth in the downhill and seventh in the slalom at the World Championships in March at Åre, Sweden. After leading the top half of the giant slalom, she fell twice near the finish was well back in 31st, which dropped her final placing in the combined to 14th.

Although Heggtveit suffered several injuries between 1955 and 1957, she still earned a spot on Canada's Olympic team at age 17 in 1956 at Cortina d'Ampezzo, Italy.

At a time when Europeans dominated alpine skiing, Heggtveit was inspired by the breakthrough performance of teammate Lucile Wheeler of Quebec, who won Olympic bronze in the downhill in 1956, and three medals at the World Championships in 1958 at Bad Gastein, Austria. Wheeler won gold in the downhill and giant slalom events, and took silver in the combined. Heggtveit finished in the top ten in three events, with an eighth in the slalom, seventh in the downhill, and sixth in the combined.

In January 1959, Heggtveit won the women's slalom at an international skiing competition in St. Moritz, Switzerland, defeating reigning world slalom champion Inger Bjørnbakken of Norway by 1.7 seconds.

At the 1960 Winter Olympic Games in Squaw Valley, California, Heggtveit won Canada's first-ever Olympic skiing gold medal. Her victory in the Olympic slalom also made her the first non-European to win the world championship in slalom and combined. Heggtveit was the first North American to win the Arlberg-Kandahar Trophy, the most prestigious and classic event in alpine skiing.

== World Championship results ==
Year	Age	Slalom	Giant Slalom	Super-G	Downhill	Combined
1954	15	7	31	not run	9	14
1956	17	30	29	not run	22	—
1958	19	8	15	not run	7	6
1960	21	1	12	not run	12	1

From 1948 through 1980, the Winter Olympics were also the World Championships for alpine skiing.
At the World Championships from 1954 through 1980, the combined was a "paper race" using the results of the three events (DH, GS, SL).

== Olympic results ==
Year	Age	Slalom	Giant Slalom	Super-G	Downhill	Combined
1956	17	30	29	not run	22	not run
1960	21	1	12	not run	12	not run

== Honors ==
Heggtveit was awarded the Lou Marsh Trophy as Canada's outstanding athlete of 1960. She was also the first recipient of the John Semmelink Memorial Award in November 1961, named for her fallen teammate. Her performance on the world stage was again recognized in 1976 when she was made a member of the Order of Canada, the country's highest civilian honor.

Heggtveit was inducted into Canada's Sports Hall of Fame in 1960, the Canadian Olympic Hall of Fame in 1971, and was among the first group inducted into the new Canadian Ski Hall of Fame in 1982.

Heggtveit has a road named after her at the Blue Mountain Ski Resort in the Town of the Blue Mountains, west of Collingwood, Ontario. She also has a ski run named after her at Camp Fortune, an extremely difficult double black diamond run.

Anne Heggtveit was inducted into the Ontario Sports Hall of Fame in 1995.

She was in the first induction of the Lisgar Collegiate Institute Athletic Wall of Fame, as part of the 160th Anniversary celebrations.

The annual Anne Heggtveit Cup, an alpine skiing competition hosted by Camp Fortune Ski Club, is named in her honour. The competition has attracted racers from Ontario, Quebec, and the United States.

== Personal life ==
Following her competitive skiing career, Heggtveit married James Ross Hamilton in August 1961. The couple initially lived in Quebec, including North Hatley in the Eastern Townships, and had two children, a son born in 1963 and a daughter born in 1965. They relocated permanently to Vermont in the United States in 1979.

From 1970 to 1976, Heggtveit directed a learn-to-ski programme at Jay Peak in Vermont. She later pursued university studies and worked in accounting, floral design and photography. She subsequently operated her own business in Vermont.

Heggtveit's older brother, Dr H. Alexander Heggtveit, is a Canadian physician and cardiovascular pathologist who became professor emeritus in the Department of Pathology and Molecular Medicine at McMaster University in Hamilton, Ontario. Their relationship is documented in the January 1996 obituary of their father, Halvor Heggtveit, published in The Ottawa Citizen.

Her paternal uncles, Eugene Heggtveit (1920–2007) and Bruce Heggtveit (1917–2002), were also accomplished competitive skiers. Eugene Robert Heggtveit (1920–2007), was a Canadian champion skier who competed in downhill, slalom, cross-country skiing and ski jumping. He was also a Royal Canadian Air Force wing commander who served as a Spitfire pilot during the Second World War. Bruce became the first recipient of the Journal Trophy in February 1939 after winning the combined downhill and slalom championship of the Gatineau Ski Zone at Camp Fortune. He later won the Ottawa Ski Club men's alpine championship in 1945. Bruce subsequently became an Ottawa-based landscape painter and art teacher, with works represented in the City of Ottawa Art Collection. Eugene and Bruce belonged to a family of five skiing brothers, alongside Anne's father, Halvor Heggtveit, and their brothers Francis and Carlyle Heggtveit.

Heggtveit is also the great-aunt of Dr Katie Heggtveit and Dr David Ryan Islip, both grandchildren of her brother, Dr H. Alexander Heggtveit. Katie was inducted into the Toronto Sport Hall of Honour in 2023 in recognition of her charitable efforts supporting fitness, weightlifting and opportunities for at-risk youth. David Ryan Islip is a quantitative researcher specializing in mathematical optimization, financial risk management and portfolio optimization. He earned a PhD in Industrial Engineering from the University of Toronto, conducting research under Professor Roy H. Kwon. He previously worked in quantitative risk analysis at Canada Guaranty Mortgage Insurance Company and subsequently joined Balyasny Asset Management in New York City.
