= Ralph St. Germain =

Canadian ice hockey player (1904–1974)

Olympic medal record

Men's Ice hockey
Silver medal – second place	1936 Garmisch-Partenkirchen	Team

Ralph Emerson St. Germain (January 19, 1904 – August 2, 1974) was a Canadian ice hockey player who competed in the 1936 Winter Olympics.

Although St. Germain was a member of the Royal Montreal Hockey Club, the Canadian ice hockey selection committee for the 1936 Winter Olympics chose to add him (along with teammates David Neville and Hugh Farquharson) to join the Port Arthur Bearcats to represent Canada in ice hockey at the 1936 Winter Olympics. St. Germain played in five games, and scored six goals, to help Canada win the silver Olympic medal. After the Olympics, Germain stated that if Canada had been seen as poor sports when they did not win the gold medal, "It was largely due to the incessant blustering and bickering of our officials", in reference to Canadian Amateur Hockey Association president E. A. Gilroy and Canadian Olympic Committee president Patrick J. Mulqueen.

In 1987 he was inducted into the Northwestern Ontario Sports Hall of Fame as a member of that Olympic team and in 2002 he was made a member of the McGill Sports Hall of Fame. He was inducted into the Lisgar Collegiate Institute Athletic Wall of Fame in 2009.
