= William Ball (skier) =

Canadian skier (1908–1979)

William L. Ball
- William Ball at the Canadian Ski Museum (November 9, 1976)

Personal information
- National team: Canada
- Born: July 18, 1908; North Hatley, Quebec, Canada
- Died: March 14, 1979 (aged 70)

Sport
- Country: Canada
- Sport: Alpine skiing; Cross-country skiing

William L. Ball (July 18, 1908 – March 14, 1979) was a Canadian alpine, cross-country, and Nordic combined skier who competed in the 1936 Winter Olympics.

Ball was born in North Hatley, Quebec. In 1936 he finished 54th in the 18 kilometre cross-country skiing event and 46th in the Nordic combined skiing competition. He also participated in the alpine skiing combined event but was unplaced due to not finishing the second slalom heat.

Ball was inducted into the Canadian Ski Hall of Fame in 1982.
