= Tom Johannessen =

Norwegian footballer (1933-1991)

Personal information
- Date of birth: 28 July 1933
- Date of death: 12 January 1991 (aged 57)

International career
Years	Team	Apps	(Gls)
1961	Norway	4	(0)

Tom Johannessen (28 July 1933 – 12 January 1991) was a Norwegian footballer. He played in four matches for the Norway national football team in 1961.
