= Roy Day =

Australian rules footballer, born 1905

Personal information
- Full name: Charles Roy Day
- Born: 19 January 1905; Sebastopol, Victoria
- Died: 5 January 1991 (aged 85); Sunshine, Victoria
- Original team: Sunshine

Playing career^{1}
Years	Club	Games (Goals)
1926–27	North Melbourne	4 (4)
1927	Footscray	2 (0)
Total		6 (4)
- ^{1} Playing statistics correct to the end of 1927.

Charles Roy Day (19 January 1905 – 5 January 1991) was an Australian rules footballer who played with North Melbourne and Footscray in the Victorian Football League (VFL).
