= Sarashi Ranjan Mukherjee =

- Born: 24 November 1919; Kolkata, West Bengal, India
- Died: 24 January 1991 (aged 71)
- Known for: Studies on hypertension and Hypothermia
- Awards: 1968 Shanti Swarup Bhatnagar Prize
- Scientific career
- Fields: Nuclear medicine; Neurobiology

Sarashi Ranjan Mukherjee (1919–1991) was an Indian surgeon and a neurobiologist. Born on 24 November 1919 in Kolkata, in the Indian state of West Bengal to Narayan Mukherjee and Kamala Devi, he was known for his studies on a number of diseases such as hypertension, hypothermia and epilepsy. He was the younger brother of Asima Chatterjee, an organic chemist and was her collaborator in her researches on the pharmacological activity of marsilin, an anticonvulsant drug. The Council of Scientific and Industrial Research, the apex agency of the Government of India for scientific research, awarded him the Shanti Swarup Bhatnagar Prize for Science and Technology, one of the highest Indian science awards for his contributions to Medical Sciences in 1968. He died on 24 January 1991, at the age of 71.
