= Lemoine Batson =

American ski jumper

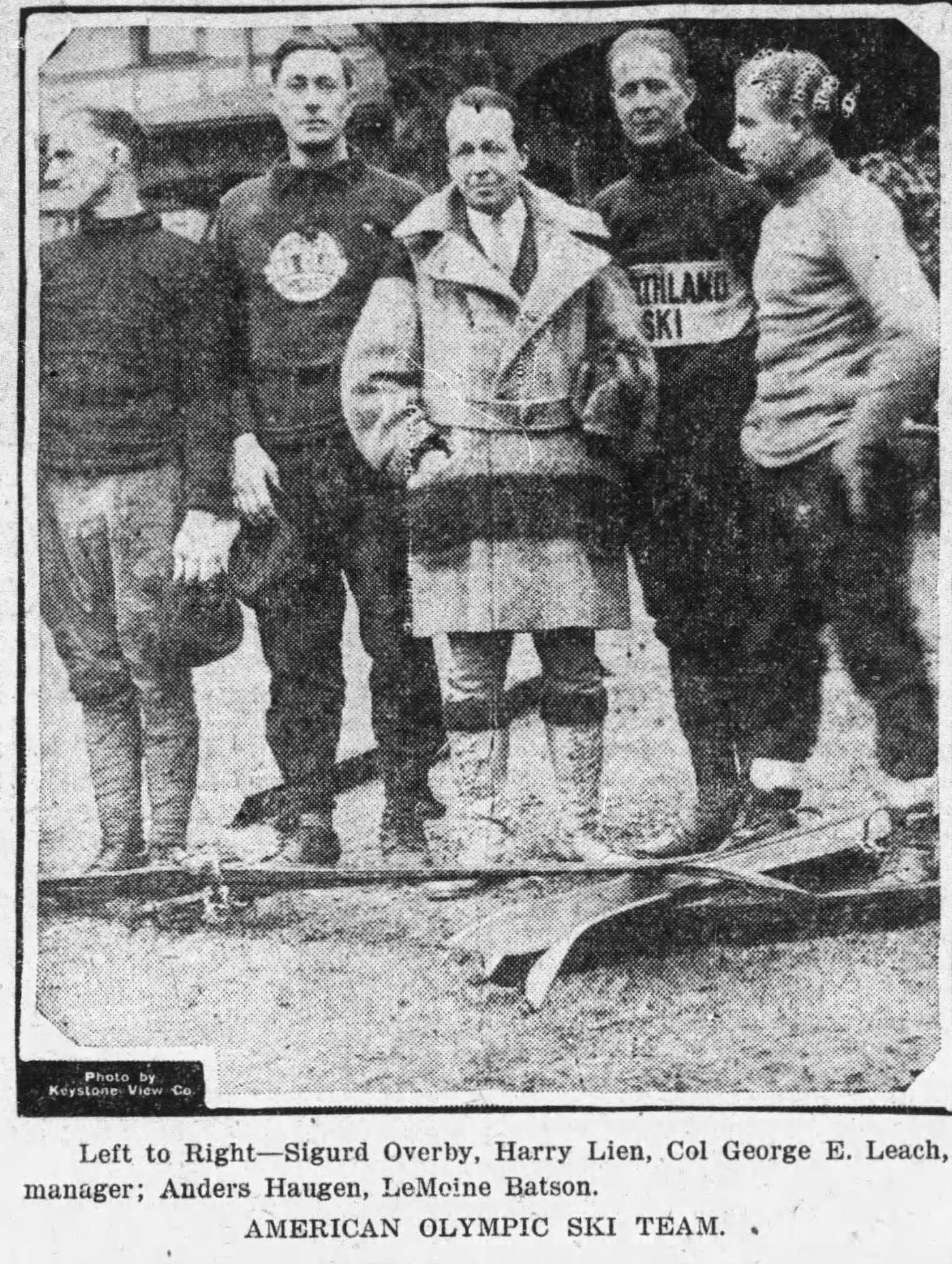
LeMoine Batson (far right)

Lemoine H. Batson (August 6, 1898 in Eau Claire, Wisconsin – January 30, 1991 in Hinsdale, Illinois) was a ski jumper from the United States in the ski jumping competition at the 1924 Winter Olympics in Chamonix. He was later selected for the 1932 Winter Olympics in Lake Placid, but did not compete.

== Olympic results ==
Event	Place
Men's Normal Hill Individual	14
