= Sven Selånger =

Swedish skier

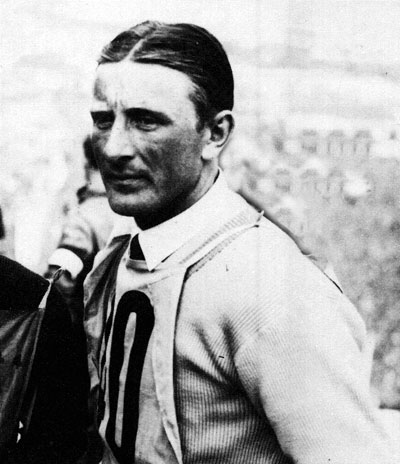
- Sven Selånger in 1939

Personal information
- Born: 19 March 1907 Sundsvall, Sweden
- Died: 9 November 1992 (aged 85) Sundsvall, Sweden

Sport
- Sport: Nordic skiing
- Events: Nordic combined, ski jumping (large hill)
- Club: Selånger SK, Sundsvall
Medal record
Representing Sweden
Olympic Games
Silver medal – second place	1936 Garmisch-Partenkirchen	Jumping
World Championships
Gold medal – first place	1933 Innsbruck	Combined
Silver medal – second place	1936 Garmisch-Partenkirchen	Jumping
Bronze medal – third place	1931 Oberhof	Jumping
Bronze medal – third place	1933 Innsbruck	Jumping
Bronze medal – third place	1934 Sollefteå	Jumping

Sven Selånger (born Sven Ivan Eriksson, 19 March 1907 – 9 November 1992) was a Swedish Nordic skier. He competed at the 1928, 1932 and 1936 Olympics in the Nordic combined and ski jumping events and won a silver in the jumping in 1936. In 1932 he finished fourth in the jumping and fifth in the Nordic combined. He was the Swedish Olympic flag bearer in 1932 and 1936.

Selånger won ski jumping bronze medals at the 1931, 1933, and 1934 FIS Nordic World Ski Championships and a gold medal in the 1933 Nordic combined event. He won the Holmenkollen ski festival's ski jumping competition in 1939, the first non-Norwegian to do so. In 1939, Selånger became the first non-Norwegian to receive the Holmenkollen medal. He also won the Svenska Dagbladet Gold Medal in 1939.

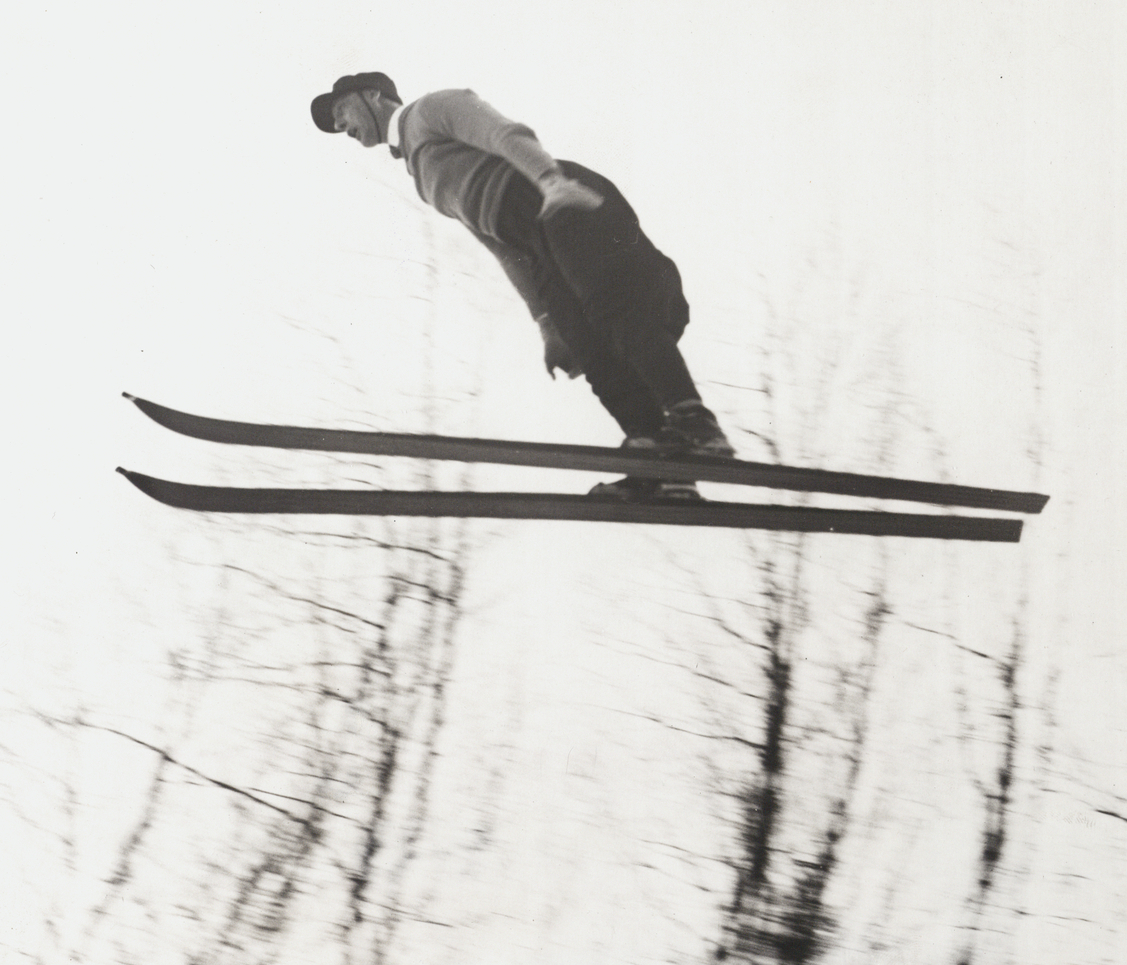
Sven Eriksson, mid-jump, 1932

Selånger was a bandy player in the 1920s. He competed in skiing as Sven Eriksson until the 1936 Winter Olympics, and then changed his surname to Selånger, after his hometown, to avoid being confused with numerous other Swedes named Eriksson. In retirement he returned to bandy, as a player and coach for IK Viking, and worked as a sporting goods trader.

Preceded by Björn Borg	Svenska Dagbladet Gold Medal; 1939	Succeeded by Henry Kälarne & Håkan Lidman
