= William Clark (skier) =

Canadian skier (1910–1975)

Personal information
- Born: July 2, 1910 Ottawa, Ontario, Canada
- Died: January 2, 1975 (aged 64)

Sport
- Sport: skiing

William "Bill", "Bud" George Clark (July 2, 1910 – January 2, 1975) was a Canadian alpine, cross-country, and Nordic combined skier who competed in the 1932 Winter Olympics and in the 1936 Winter Olympics.

Clark excelled in all styles of skiing, winning national championships in Nordic, alpine, and cross-country classifications. He was born in Ottawa, Ontario.

== Olympics ==
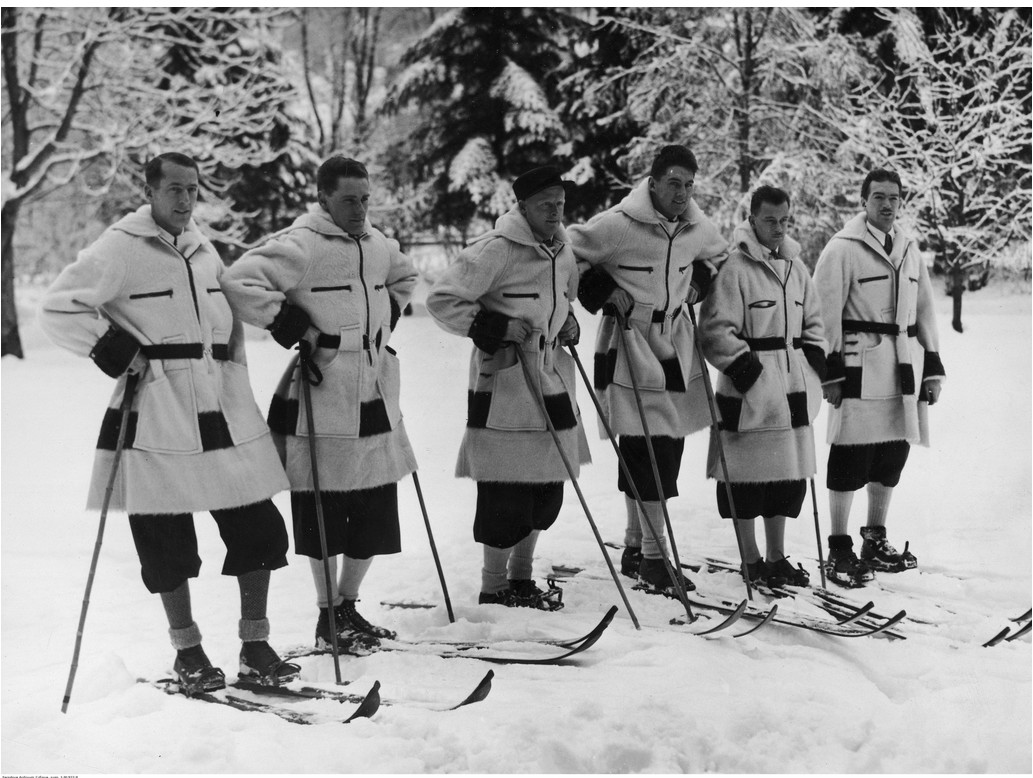
The Canadian team during the 1936 winter Olympic Games; Clark is the second to the left.

Clark finished 38th in the shorter cross-country skiing competition at the 1932 Olympics.

In 1936, he finished 47th in the 18 kilometre cross-country skiing event and 39th in the Nordic combined skiing competition. He also participated in the alpine skiing combined event but was unplaced due to not finishing the second slalom heat.

He continued to promote the sport later in life, serving as President of the Canadian Ski Association.

== Honours ==
He is a member of the Canadian Ski Hall of Fame.

He was inducted into the Lisgar Collegiate Institute Athletic Wall of Fame (LAWOF) in 2009.

== Family ==
Clark was the brother of Doll Clark, wife of Canadian cross-country skiing champion Halvor Heggtveit. Their daughter, Anne Heggtveit, was Clark's niece and became Canada's first Olympic gold medallist in skiing at the 1960 Winter Olympics. Clark, Halvor Heggtveit and Anne Heggtveit were all inducted into the Lisgar Collegiate Institute Athletic Wall of Fame for their contributions to skiing. Clark was also the maternal uncle of Anne's brother, Dr H. Alexander Heggtveit, a Canadian cardiovascular pathologist and professor emeritus at McMaster University.
