= Goro Adachi =

Japanese ski jumper

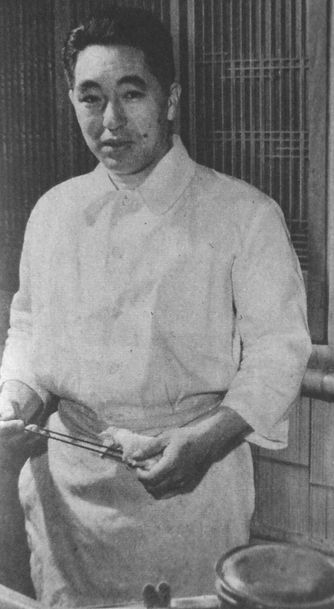
- Goro Adachi in 1955

Personal information
- Nationality: Japanese
- Born: 1 January 1913; Akaigawa, Japan
- Died: 13 September 1999 (aged 86); Kitakyushu, Japan
- Height: 1.56 m (5 ft 1 in)
- Weight: 56 kg (123 lb)

Sport
- Sport: Ski jumping

Goro Adachi (安達 五郎, Adachi Gorō, 1 January 1913 – 13 September 1999) was a Japanese ski jumper. He competed in the 1932 and 1936 Winter Olympics.
