= Heinz Palme =

German ski jumper

Personal information
- Nationality: Nazi Germany
- Born: 20 May 1912 Jablonec nad Nisou, Kingdom of Bohemia
- Died: 20 February 1987 (aged 74) Salzburg, Austria

Sport
- Sport: Skiing
- Club: SC Salzburg

Heinrich Palme (25 May 1912 – 20 February 1987) was a German ski jumper.

== Career ==
In 1938 he started to jump for Nazi Germany as to which his homeland was annexed too and that's why he competed at German National Championships. He made his first ski jumping steps at Harrachov.

On 2 March 1941 he touched the ground at world record distance of 109 metres (358 ft) at Bloudkova velikanka hill in Planica, Yugoslavia. After WW2 Palme became the member of Salzburg Ski Club and since 1947 he competed for seniors.

Heinz Palme was the grandfather of the Austrian chief coordinator at Euro 2008 which was held in Austria and Switzerland. He is buried with his wife Imelda in the Salzburg's Maxglan city cemetery.

== Invalid ski jumping world record ==
Date	Hill	Location	Metres	Feet
2 March 1941	Bloudkova velikanka K120	Planica, Yugoslavia	109	358

Not recognized! Touch ground at world record distance.
