= Eigil Hansen =

Danish field hockey player

Personal information
- Nationality: Danish
- Born: 3 February 1922 Copenhagen, Denmark
- Died: 21 January 1991 (aged 68) Hovedstaden, Denmark

Sport
- Sport: Field hockey

Eigil Hansen (3 February 1922 – 21 January 1991) was a Danish field hockey player. He competed in the men's tournament at the 1948 Summer Olympics.
