= Hugh Farquharson =

Canadian ice hockey player

Olympic medal record

Men's Ice hockey
| Silver medal – second place | 1936 Garmisch-Partenkirchen | Team competition |

Hugh Miller Farquharson (November 4, 1911 – March 27, 1985) was a Canadian ice hockey player who competed in the 1936 Winter Olympics.

He graduated from McGill University with a BA in 1931 and a Bachelor of Common Law in 1934. He played forward with the McGill Redmen from 1927 to 1934 and a co-captain in 1931–32. While playing at McGill, he led the Redmen to four championships in six seasons.

Although Farquharson was a member of the Royal Montreal Hockey Club, the Canadian ice hockey selection committee for the 1936 Winter Olympics chose to add him (along with teammates David Neville and Ralph St. Germain) to join the Port Arthur Bearcats to represent Canada in ice hockey at the 1936 Winter Olympics. Farquharson was Team Canada's leading scorer with 11 goals to help Canada win the silver Olympic medal.

In 1987 he was inducted into the Northwestern Ontario Sports Hall of Fame as a member of that Olympic team, and he was made a member of the McGill Sports Hall of Fame in 2002.
