= Cliff Tyson =

Australian rules footballer, born 1910

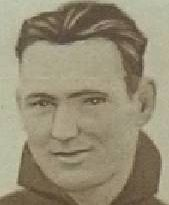

Personal information
- Full name: Clifford James Tyson
- Born: 18 September 1909; Coolgardie, Western Australia
- Died: 14 January 1991 (aged 81); Yarra Junction, Victoria
- Original team: Lake Boga

Playing career^{1}
Years	Club	Games (Goals)
1929	North Melbourne	1 (0)
1933	Melbourne	2 (1)
Total		3 (1)
- ^{1} Playing statistics correct to the end of 1933.

Clifford James Tyson (18 September 1909 – 14 January 1991) was an Australian rules footballer who played with North Melbourne and Melbourne in the Victorian Football League (VFL).
