= Vishwa Gopal Jhingran =

Indian zoologist and aquaculture scientist (1919–1991)

- Born: 1919; Lucknow, Uttar Pradesh, India
- Died: 15 January 1991 (aged 71–72)
- Occupations: Zoologist, aquaculture scientist
- Known for: Aquaculture techniques
- Awards: Padma Shri; Rafi Ahmed Kidwai Memorial Prize

Vishwa Gopal Jhingran (1919–1991) was an Indian zoologist and aquaculture scientist, known for the introduction of a composite fish culture technique by name, aquaplosion. He was a recipient of the fourth highest Indian civilian award of Padma Shri from the Government of India in 1977.

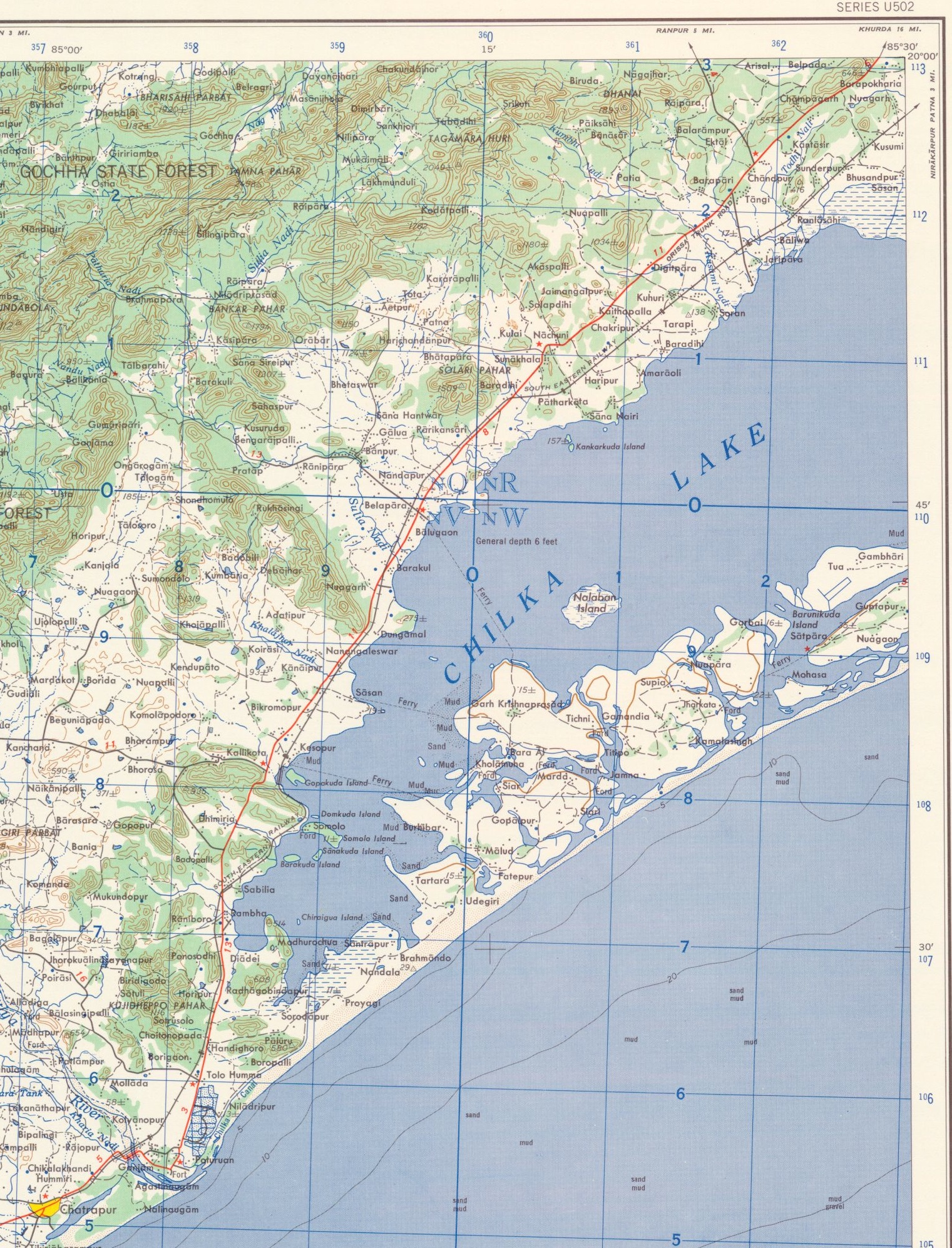
Chilka Lake

== Biography ==
Born in the Indian state of Uttar Pradesh in 1919, Jhingran secured his doctoral degree (PhD) from Stanford University, USA in 1948. He served as the director of the Central Inland Fisheries Research Institute (CIFRI), Barrackpore where he was known to have introduced pioneering techniques in aquaculture. His contributions have been reported in the propagation of Mrigal carp and the fish tagging operations in Chilka lake, a large brackish water lagoon in Odisha, India. He was the author of a voluminous work on fisheries, Fish and Fisheries of India and a manual of hatching techniques, A Hatchery Manual for the Common, Chinese, and Indian Major Carps. He also published handbooks and several monographs on various Indian fish species.

Jhingran was the president of the Inland Fisheries Society of India and chaired the Food and Agriculture Organization sponsored symposium on Development and Utilization of Indian Fisheries Resources held in Colombo in 1976. A member of Sigma Xi, USA, Jihngran was a fellow of the Zoological Society of India, the Indian National Science Academy and the National Academy of Sciences, India. He was a recipient of the Rafi Ahmed Kidwai Memorial Prize in 1973 and the civilian honour of Padma Shri in 1976.

Vishwa Gopal Jhingran died on 15 January 1991 at the age of 71.

== Bibliography ==
- Fish and Fisheries of India
- A Hatchery Manual for the Common, Chinese, and Indian Major Carps
- Introduction to Aquaculture
- Synopsis of Biological Data on Catla: Catla Catla
- Coldwater Fisheries of India
- Synopsis of Biological Data on the Mrigal: Cirrhinus Mrigala
- Methodology for Survey of Brackishwater Areas in India for Coastal Aquaculture
- Catalogue of Cultivated Aquatic Organisms
- Synopsis of biological data on the Mrigal, Cirrhinus mrigala
- Synopsis of Biological Data on Rohu, Labeo Rohita

== See also ==
- Aquaculture
