= Walter Kitchen =

Canadian ice hockey player

- Born: December 18, 1912 Toronto, Ontario, Canada
- Died: July 18, 1988 (aged 75)
- Position: Defence
- Played for: Toronto Marlboros; Toronto British Consols
- National team: Canada
- Playing career: 1929–1936

Olympic medal record

Men's Ice hockey
Silver medal – second place	1936 Garmisch-Partenkirchen	Team competition

Walter Lawrence "Pud" Kitchen (December 18, 1912 – July 18, 1988) was a Canadian ice hockey player who competed in the 1936 Winter Olympics. As owner of the horse Hail To Patsy, he won the 1969 Kentucky Oaks at Churchill Downs. Kitchen was a member of the 1936 Port Arthur Bearcats, which won the silver medal for Canada in ice hockey at the 1936 Winter Olympics. In 1987 he was inducted into the Northwestern Ontario Sports Hall of Fame as a member of that Olympic team.
