= Norman Gagne =

Canadian ski jumper

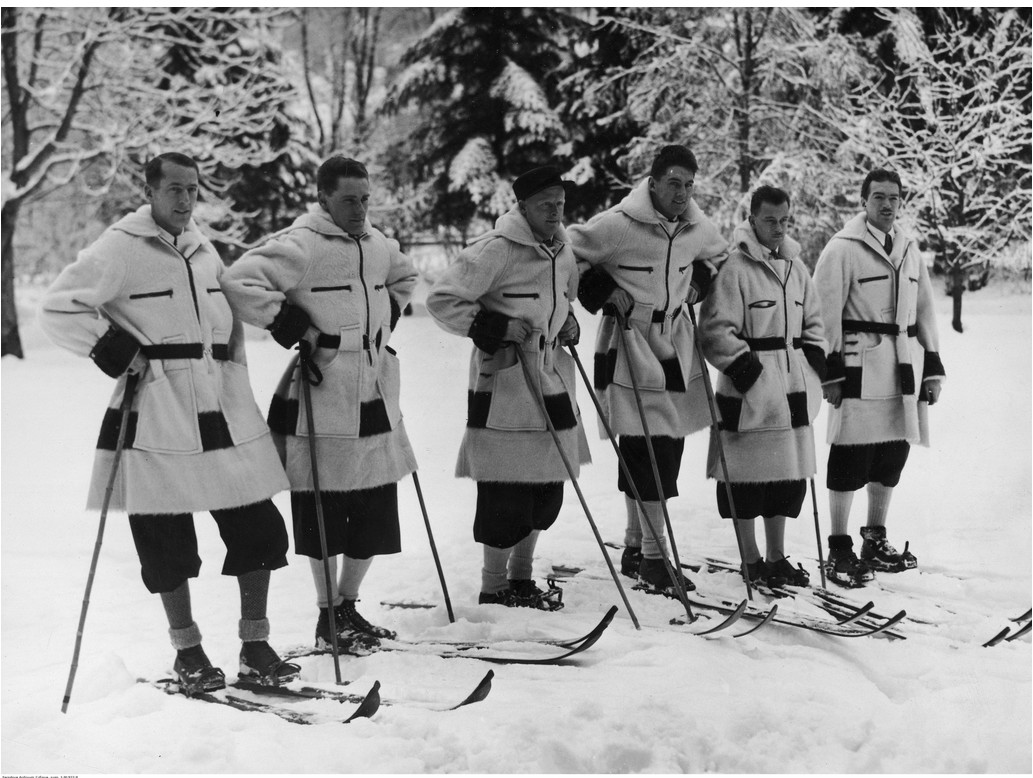
- Norman Gagne (2nd from the right) in 1936

Personal information
- Born: 3 January 1911; Montreal, Quebec, Canada
- Died: 28 November 1986 (aged 75); Montreal, Quebec, Canada

Sport
- Sport: Ski jumping

Norman Gagne (3 January 1911 – 28 November 1986) was a Canadian ski jumper. He competed in the individual event at the 1936 Winter Olympics.
