= Shinji Tatsuta =

Japanese ski jumper

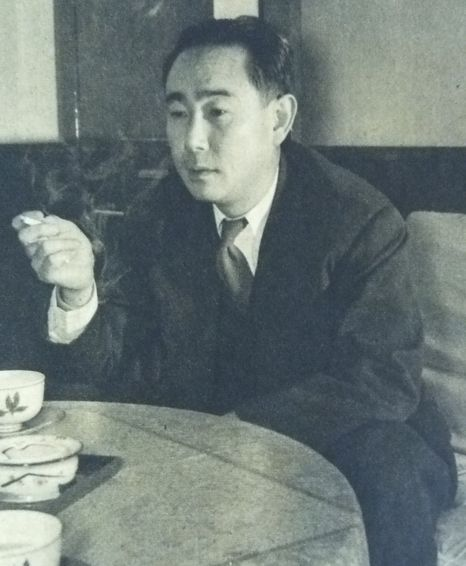
- Tatsuta Shunji in 1955.

Personal information
- Nationality: Japanese
- Born: 23 December 1914; Otaru, Japan
- Died: 1 January 1991 (aged 76)

Sport
- Sport: Ski jumping

Shinji Tatsuta (23 December 1914 – 1 January 1991) was a Japanese ski jumper. He competed in the individual event at the 1936 Winter Olympics.
