= Karl Johan Baadsvik =

Canadian skier (1910–1995)

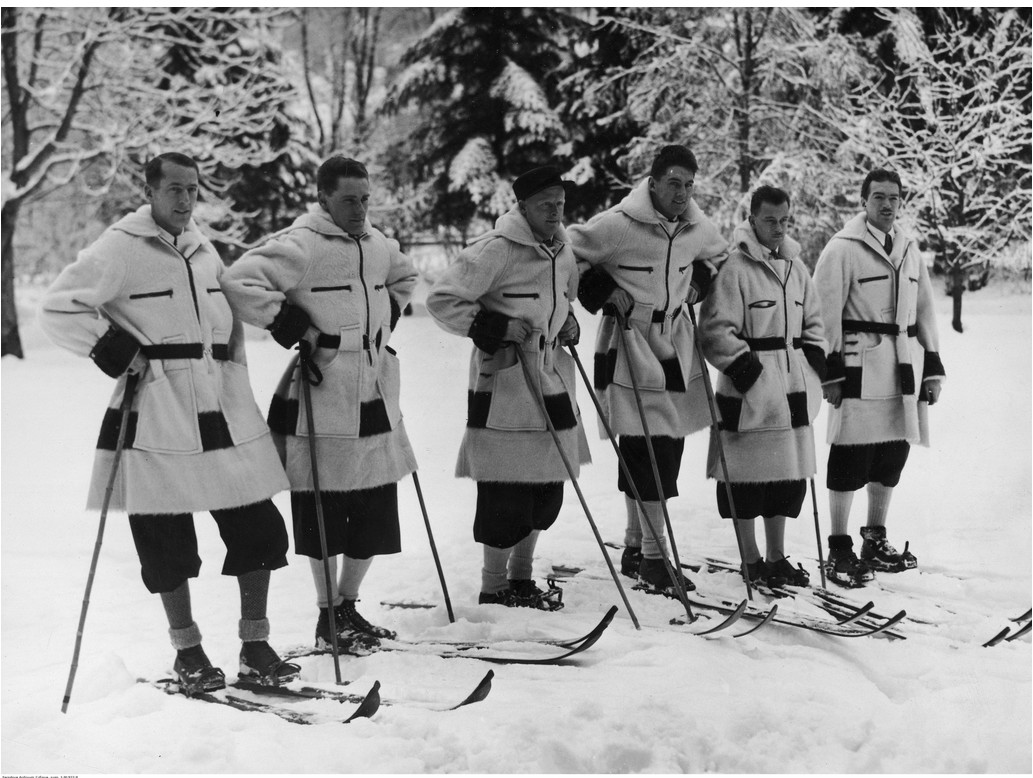
Canadian team during the 1936 Olympics.jpg

Karl Johan Baadsvik (22 August 1910 – 5 October 1995) was a Canadian skier, born in Hitra Municipality, Norway. He competed in ski jumping, cross-country skiing, Nordic combined, and alpine skiing at the 1936 Winter Olympics in Garmisch-Partenkirchen.
