= Tormod Mobraaten =

Canadian skier (1910–1991)

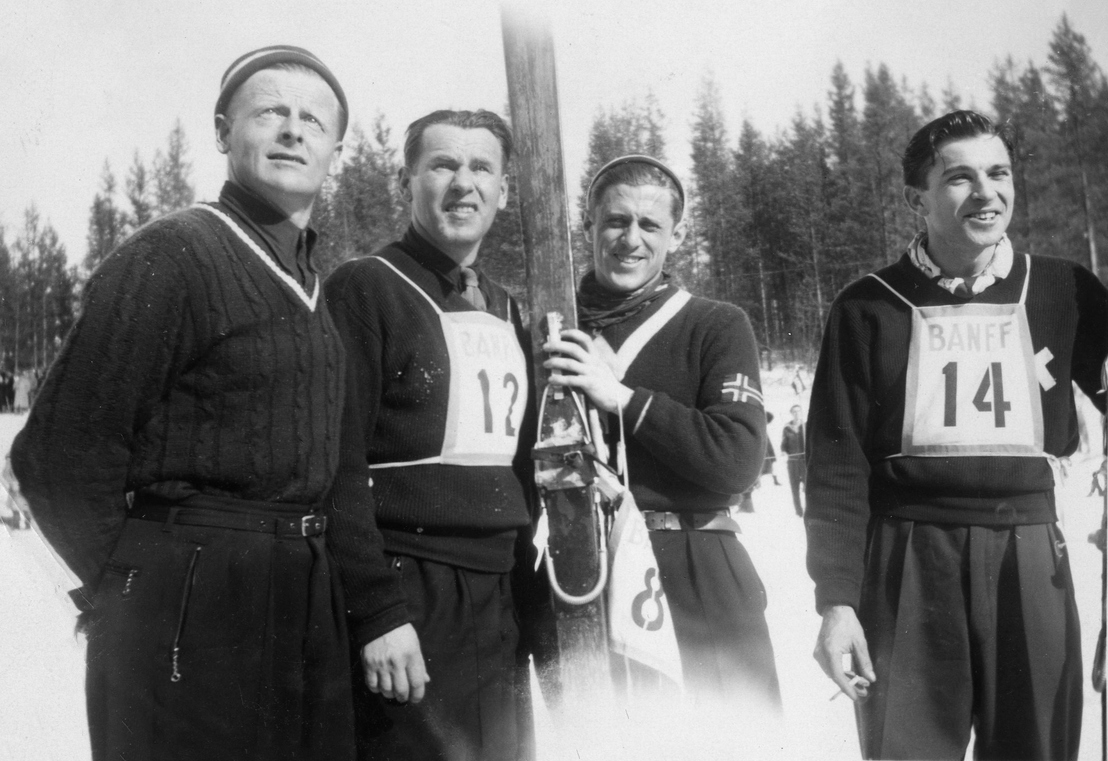
Tormod Mobraaten (left)

Tormod Knutsen "Tom" Mobraaten (19 February 1910 – 10 June 1991) was a Canadian skier, born in Kongsberg, Norway. He competed in ski jumping, cross-country skiing, and Nordic combined. He participated at the 1936 Winter Olympics in Garmisch-Partenkirchen, and at the 1948 Winter Olympics in St. Moritz.
