= Strážné =

- Municipality
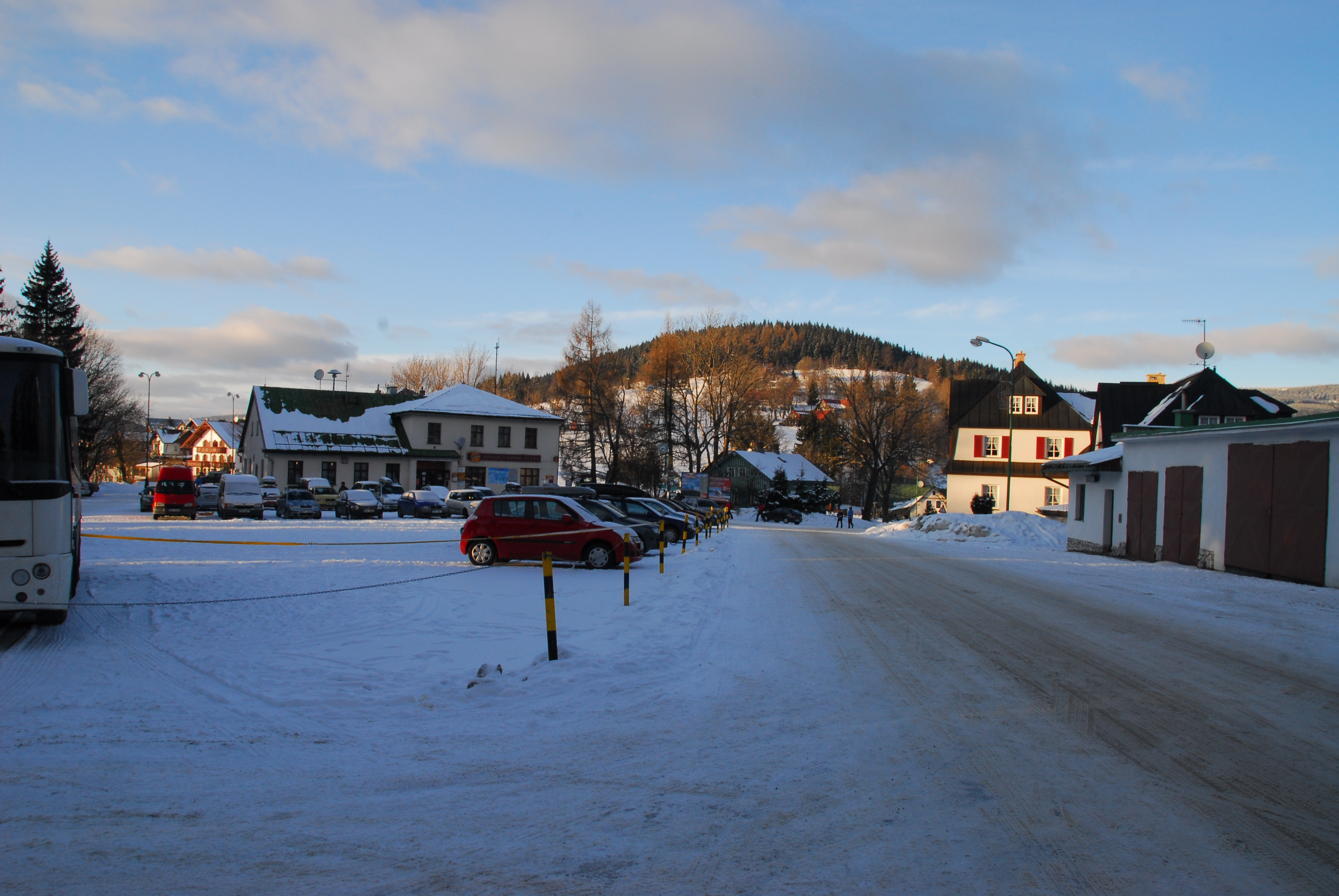
- Centre of Strážné

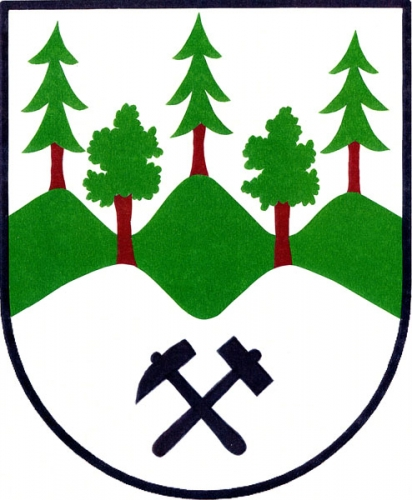
- Flag Coat of arms

- Location in the Czech Republic
- Coordinates: 50°40′7″N 15°37′5″E
- Country: Czech Republic
- Region: Hradec Králové
- District: Trutnov
- First mentioned: 1754

Area
  - Total: 17.68 km^{2} (6.83 sq mi)
- Elevation: 798 m (2,618 ft)

Population (2026-01-01)
  - Total: 214
  - Density: 12.1/km^{2} (31.3/sq mi)
- Time zone: UTC+1 (CET)
  - Summer (DST): UTC+2 (CEST)
- Postal code: 543 52
- Website: www.strazne.eu

Strážné (until 1946 Pommerndorf) is a municipality and village in Trutnov District in the Hradec Králové Region of the Czech Republic. It has about 200 inhabitants. It lies in the Giant Mountains.

== Etymology ==
The initial name of the village was Pommerndorf, meaning "Pomeranian village" ("the village of people from Pomerania"). Despite being a German-language name, it was also used as the official name in Czech, which lasted until 1946, when the municipality and village were renamed Strážné. The Czech word strážné translates as 'guarding'.

== Geography ==
Strážné is located about 23 kilometres (14 mi) northwest of Trutnov and 39 km (24 mi) east of Liberec. It lies in the Giant Mountains and in the Krkonoše National Park. The highest point is the mountain Liščí hora at 1,363 m (4,472 ft) above sea level. The Malé Labe River originates near the northern municipal border, forms part of the municipal border and then flows across the municipality.

== History ==
The iron ore was mined in the area probably already in the 15th century, and in the 16th century, mining was at its peak. However, a settlement was founded here later. The first written mention Strážné is from 1754, that time under the name Pommerndorf. According to legends, it was founded by exiled people from Pomerania during the Thirty Years' War. The area of today's Strážné also included the village of Herlíkovice.

In 1792, the mining stopped. The source of livelihood then became forestry, cattle breeding and textile industry. Since the 19th century, tourism is developing. In 1945, the German population was expelled and the area significantly depopulated. Therefore, in 1951 Herlíkovice was abolished, and its territory was divided between Strážné and Vrchlabí.

== Demographics ==
Historical population

Year	Pop.	±%
1869	1,804	—
1880	1,728	−4.2%
1890	1,581	−8.5%
1900	1,607	+1.6%
1910	1,468	−8.6%

Year	Pop.	±%
1921	1,233	−16.0%
1930	1,157	−6.2%
1950	743	−35.8%
1961	176	−76.3%
1970	150	−14.8%

Year	Pop.	±%
1980	124	−17.3%
1991	114	−8.1%
2001	150	+31.6%
2011	184	+22.7%
2021	178	−3.3%

Source: Censuses

== Transport ==
There are no railways or major roads passing through the municipality.

== Sport ==
In the municipality is a ski resort with four ski slopes.

== Sights ==
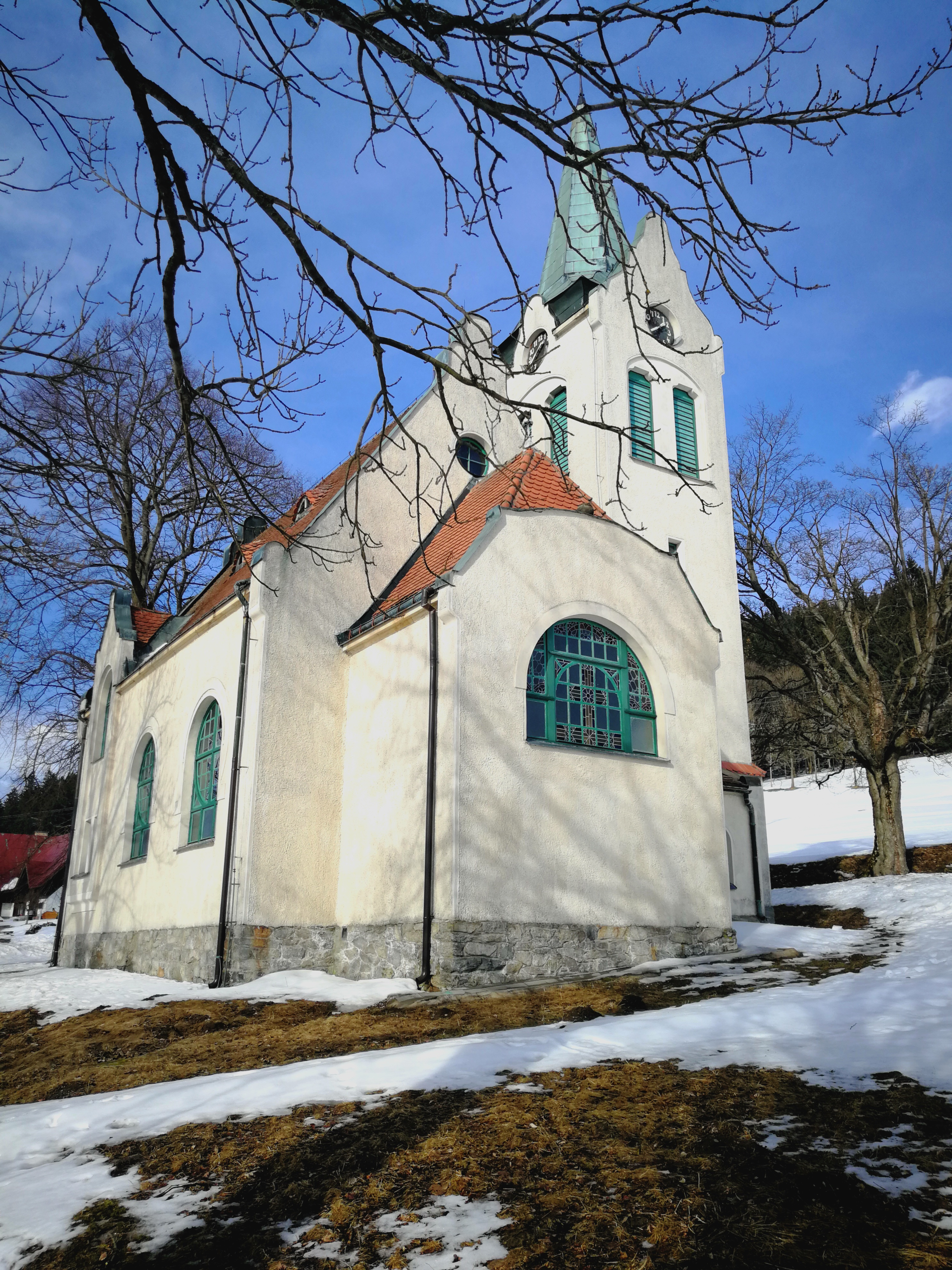
Evangelical church

The main landmark is the Art Nouveau building of the Evangelical church in the former village of Herlíkovice. It was built in 1903–1904 according to the design by Schilling & Graebner.

== Notable people ==
- Johann Lahr (1913–1942), ski jumper
