= Johann Lahr =

Czech ski jumper

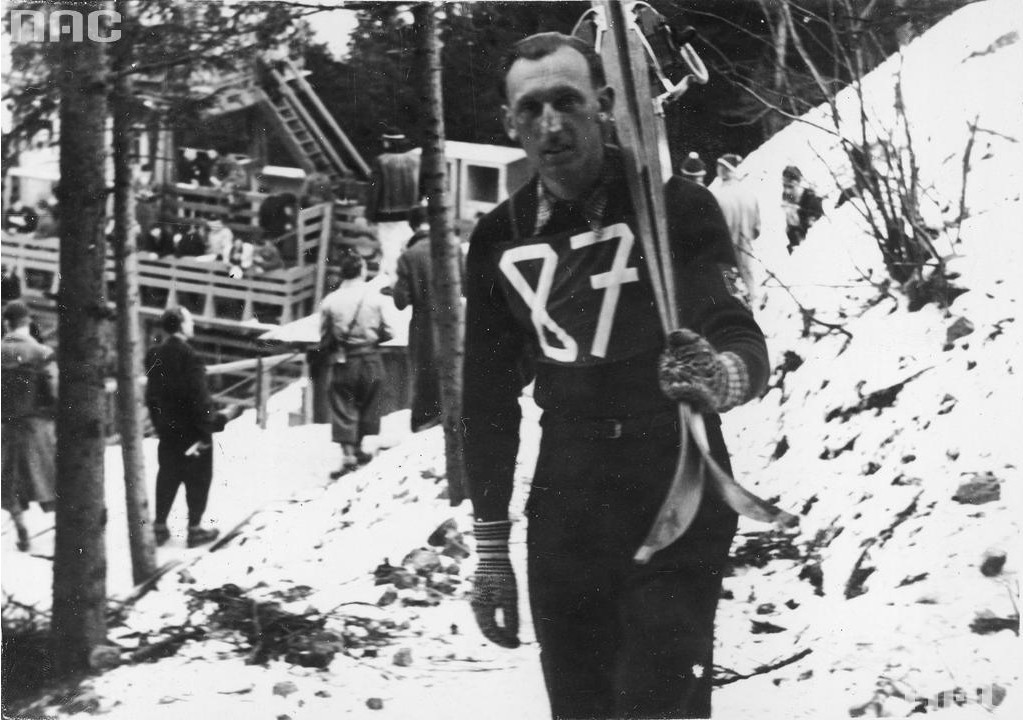
- Johann Lahr in 1939

Personal information
- Nationality: Czechoslovakia
- Born: 21 January 1913 Strážné, Bohemia, Austria-Hungary
- Died: 24 February 1942 (aged 29) Rudnya, Soviet Union

Sport
- Sport: Skiing

Achievements and titles
- Personal bests: 111 m (364 ft); Planica, King. of Yugoslavia (2 March 1941)

Johann Lahr (21 January 1913 – 24 February 1942) was a Czechoslovak ski jumper. He competed in the individual event at the 1936 Winter Olympics. On 2 March 1941, he set personal best at 111 m (364 ft) in Planica, and not a world record as it was misconception for many years. Lahr, an ethnic German, served in Wehrmacht, and was killed in action on the Eastern Front during World War II.
