= David Neville (ice hockey) =

Canadian ice hockey player

- Born: September 5, 1908 Hamilton, Ontario, Canada
- Died: October 14, 1991 (aged 83)
- Height: 5 ft 6 in (168 cm)
- Weight: 145 lb (66 kg; 10 st 5 lb)
- Position: Right wing
- Shot: Right
- Played for: Montreal Royals
- National team: Canada
- Playing career: 1929–1939

Olympic medal record

Men's Ice hockey
Silver medal – second place	1936 Garmisch-Partenkirchen	Team

David John Neville (September 5, 1908 – October 14, 1991) was a Canadian ice hockey player who competed in the 1936 Winter Olympics.

Although Neville was a member of the Royal Montreal Hockey Club, the Canadian ice hockey selection committee for the 1936 Winter Olympics chose to add Neville (along with teammates Hugh Farquharson and Ralph St. Germain) to join the Port Arthur Bearcats to represent Canada in ice hockey at the 1936 Winter Olympics. Neville scored eight goals in eight games to help Team Canada win the silver Olympic medal.

In 1987 he was inducted into the Northwestern Ontario Sports Hall of Fame as a member of that Olympic team.
