= Heini Klopfer =

Personal information
- Full name: Heinrich Klopfer
- Nationality: German
- Born: April 3, 1918 Immenstadt im Allgäu, Germany
- Died: November 18, 1968 (aged 50) Oberstdorf, Germany

Sport
- Sport: Ski jumping

Heinrich "Heini" Klopfer (3 April 1918 in Oberstdorf – 18 November 1968) was a German ski jumper and architect.

At age 17, Klopfer was selected for trials for the 1936 Winter Olympics, but failed to qualify. After World War II Klopfer, Sepp Weiler and Toni Brutscher became known as the Oberstdorf Jumping Trio. He started working with construction of ski jumping hill. Klopfer has designed or been adviser for more than 250 hills. Main designs included all Olympic jumps used between 1960 and 1976, and he even designed one of the reconstructions of Holmenkollbakken in Oslo. He also was the ski jumping technical commissioner for the International Ski Federation. He died of a heart attack at the age of 50. In 1970, Heini-Klopfer-Skiflugschanze in Oberstdorf, one of the world's five ski flying hills, was named for him.
