= Paul Krauß =

German ski jumper

Personal information
- Nationality: Nazi Germany
- Born: 18 October 1917 Johanngeorgenstadt, Kingdom of Saxony, German Empire
- Died: 15 February 1942 (aged 24) Borovichi, Soviet Union

Sport
- Sport: Skiing

Achievements and titles
- Personal bests: 112 m (367 ft); Planica, King. of Yugoslavia (2 March 1941)

Paul Krauß (18 October 1917 – 15 February 1942) was a German ski jumper.

== Career ==
In 1941 on Bloudkova velikanka in Planica at Smuški poleti Week event, he set only a personal best with 112 metres (367 ft) and not world record as it was misconception for many years. He took 43rd place on normal hill at 1936 Winter Olympics in Garmisch-Partenkirchen. Krauß died as a soldier on the Eastern Front (World War II).

== Winter Olympics ==
Rank	Location	Year	Hill
18	(Germany) Garmisch-Partenkirchen	1936	normal
