= List of longest ski jumps =

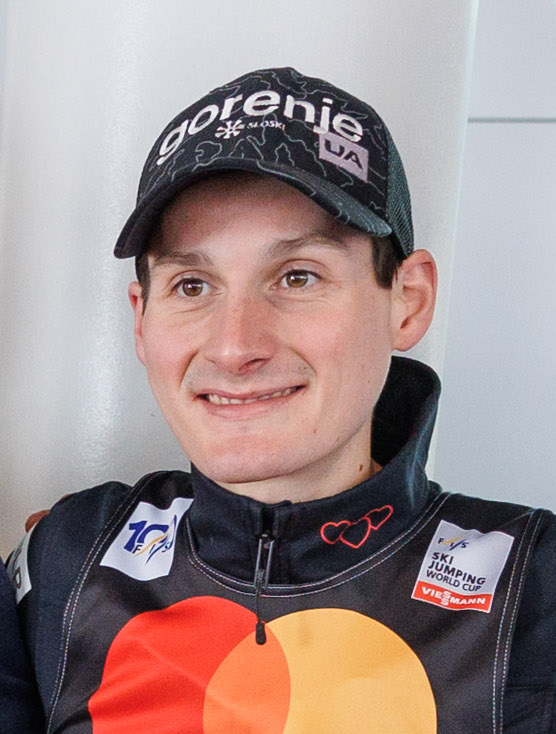
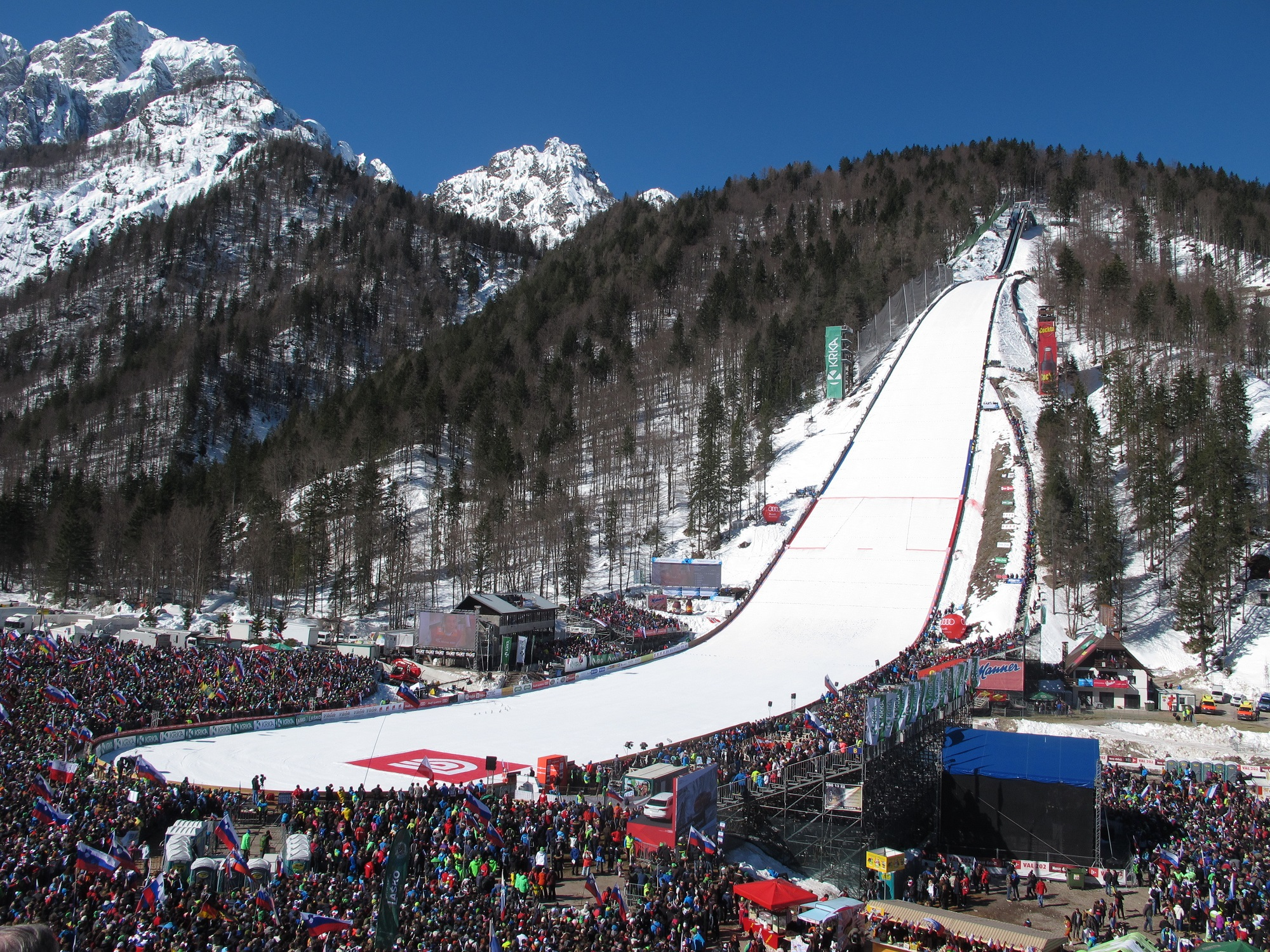
Domen Prevc has held the official world record of 254.5 m (835 ft) since 2025 (set at Letalnica bratov Gorišek in Planica - this venue thus hosting, for the first time after twenty years,
the 29th world record in total)
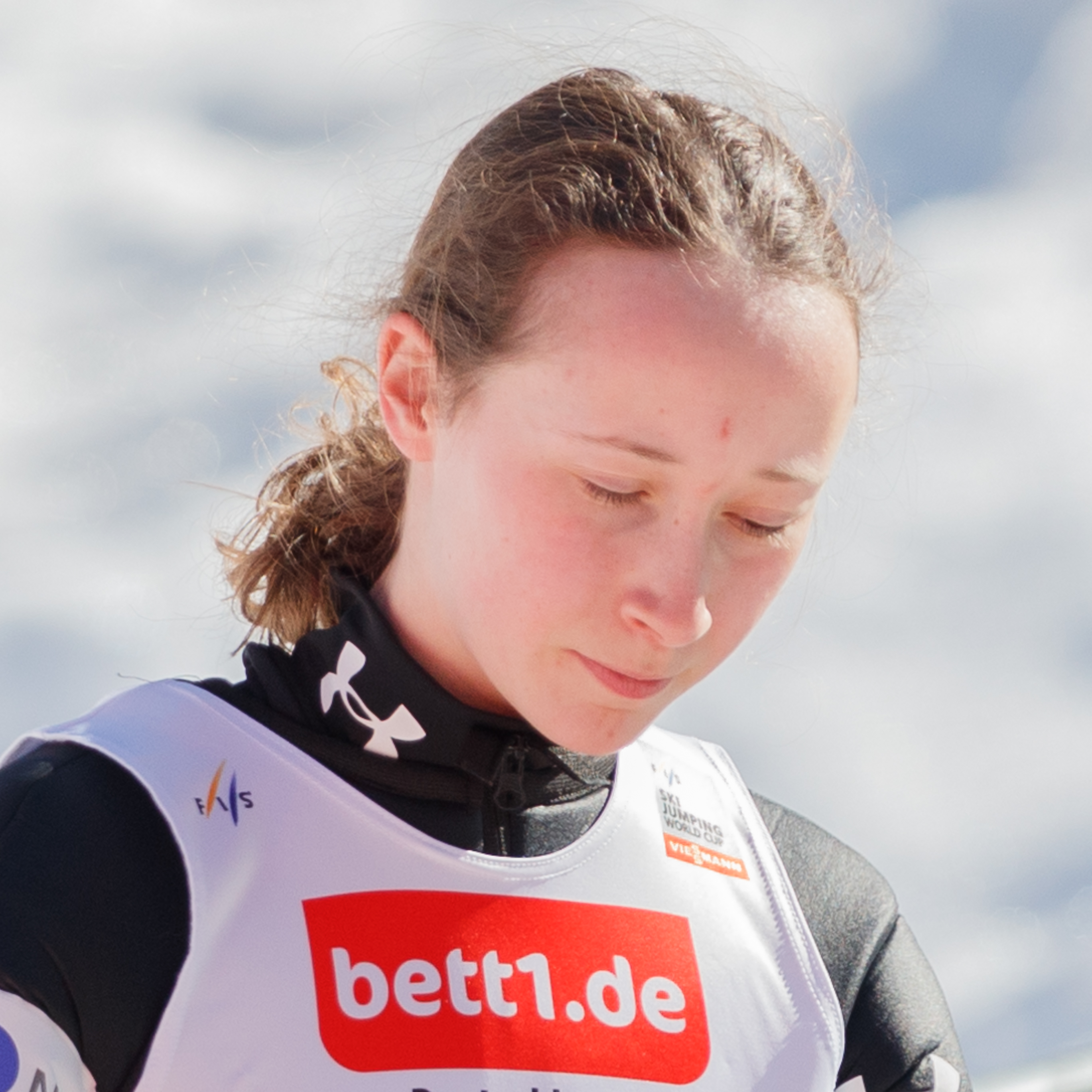
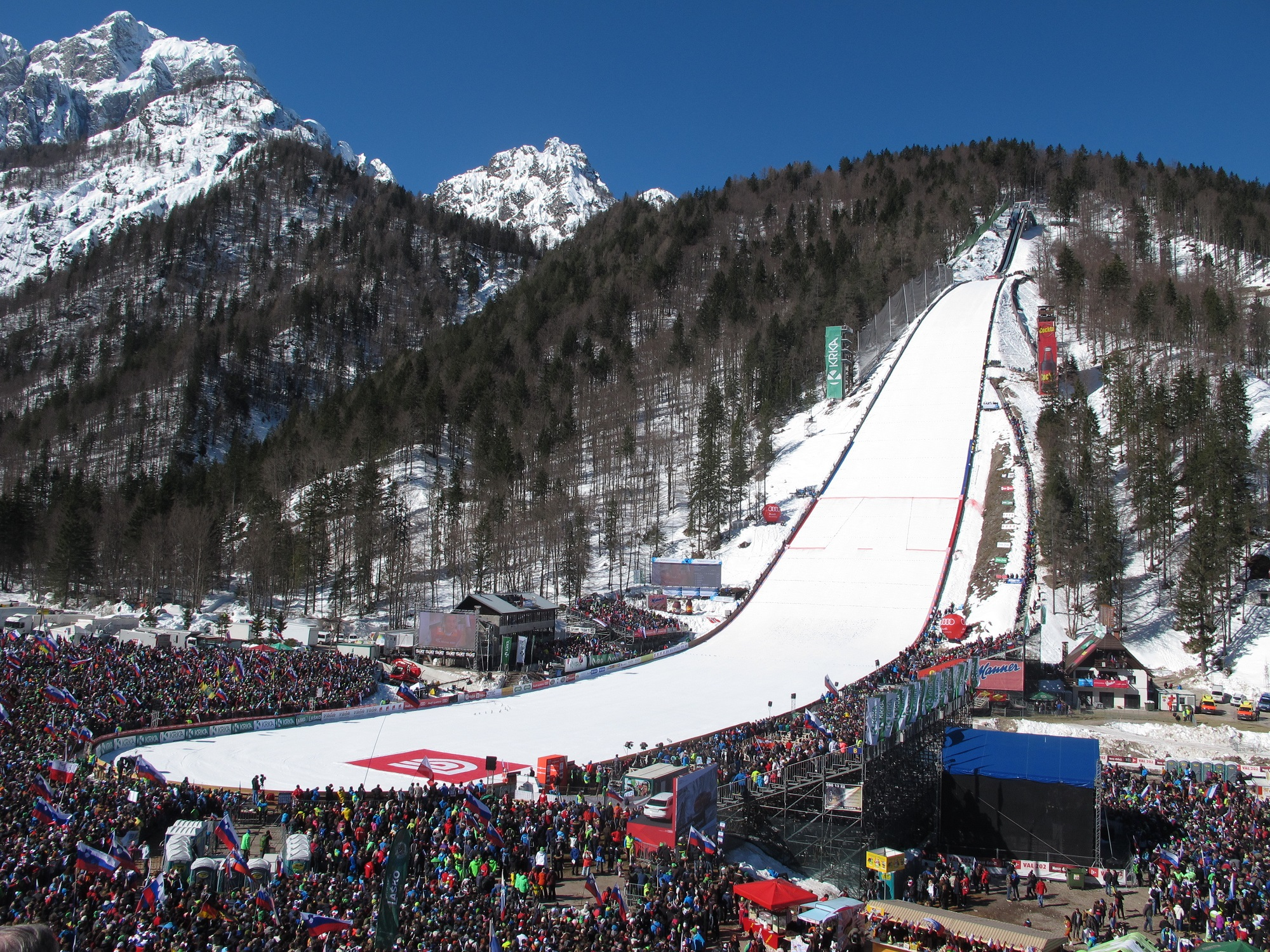
Nika Prevc has held the women's WR of 242.5 m (796 ft) since 2026 at Letalnica bratov Gorišek, Planica

«...Fourth on the start was Gering. He was flying and flying, very high and landed in a perfect position. We all knew something extraordinary happened. People responsible for distance measuring didn't have numbers, they figured out little later that he landed at 118 metres. After WR, when extatic crowd finally calmed down, competition continued with Paul Schneidenbach who had landed at 101 metres, after him Hans Lahr landed at 111 metres, then after that Paul Krauß at 112 metres and the very last was Franz Maier who crashed at 109 metres.»

— Only two WRs set in Planica 1941
("Jutro: Serija senzacij", p.1, column 4)

Ski jumping is a winter sport in which athletes compete on distance and style in a jump from a ski jumping hill. The sport has traditionally focused on a combination of style and distance, and it was therefore early seen as unimportant in many milieus to have the longest jump. The International Ski Federation (Fédération Internationale de Ski; FIS) has opposed the increase in hill sizes, and do not recognize any world records.

Since 1936, when the first jump beyond 100 metres (330 ft) was made, all world records in the sport have been made in the discipline of ski flying, an offshoot of ski jumping using larger hills where distance is explicitly emphasised. As of 30 March 2025, the longest jump ever recorded in any official competition is 254.5 metres (835 ft), set by Domen Prevc at Letalnica bratov Gorišek in Planica, Slovenia. As of 28 March 2026, the women's world record stands at 242.5 m (796 ft), set by Nika Prevc in Planica.

On 23 and 24 April 2024, Ryōyū Kobayashi made four successful attempts to unofficially break the world record on a temporary ski flying hill at Hlíðarfjall in Akureyri, Iceland. The purpose-built hill was constructed by Red Bull for promotional purposes. On the first day, Kobayashi jumped 256 m (840 ft). The following day he improved it to 259 m (850 ft), 282 m (925 ft), and finally 291 m (955 ft).

== History ==
Ski jumping originated in Norway, and has been practiced since time immemorial, using handmade temporary hills. The first record is credited to Olaf Rye, a Norwegian-Danish soldier, who set up a show spectated by his fellow soldiers in 1808, on an improvised hill of handmade piled snow, reaching 9.4 metres (15 alen) in Eidsberg, Norway. This artificial small hill was built at Lekum gård (farm), a few hundred metres away from Eidsberg church.

Sondre Norheim, credited as the 'father' of modern skiing, made the second official record at 19.5 metres (64 ft) in 1868. Tim Ashburn says in his book The History of Ski Jumping that Norheim's longest jump on the circular track in Haugli ground in 1868 should have been measured at 31.5 metres (50 alen) but that newspapers in Christiania reported that the length "was a little exaggerated", so the official record is everywhere written as 19.5 m.

The sport quickly spread to Finland, the United States and Canada, where some of the subsequent records were set. Early jumping competitions were only scored by style, and it was seen as disruptive to attempt to jump further. Not until 1901 was a scoring system for distance introduced. With the construction of Bloudkova Velikanka in Planica, Yugoslavia, in 1934, the separate discipline of ski flying was introduced, which is essentially an 'extreme' version of ski jumping.

With one exception, all of the world records for distance have been set on five of the world's six ski flying hills, of which five remain in use. In 1936, Josef "Sepp" Bradl was the first to surpass 100 metres (330 ft), landing a jump of 101.5 metres (333 ft). The FIS was long opposed to ski flying as a whole, and it has never been included in the Olympic or Nordic World Ski Championships. However, since 1972, the FIS Ski Flying World Championships has been a mainstay event, and ski flying event are also part of the FIS Ski Jumping World Cup calendar. The first to officially reach 200 metres (660 ft) was Toni Nieminen in 1994, by landing a jump of 203 metres (666 ft); at the time, ski jumpers did not receive distance points for the part of the jumps exceeding 191 metres.

The distance of a ski jump is measured from the end of the 'table' (the very tip of the 'inrun' ramp) to halfway between the athletes' feet when they touch ground. To qualify, the jump must be made in a sanctioned competition, or official trial or qualification runs for these, with a system to control the actual length. To win a competition, an athlete needs both distance and style, the latter of which is achieved by attaining a proper Telemark landing; therefore jumpers are not motivated to jump as far as possible, only as far necessary to attain a good landing. Jumps are invalid if the jumper falls, defined as touching the ground with his hands or body before reaching the fall line. However, if an athlete touches the snow with any part of their body after landing, and receives style points greater than 14 from at least three judges, the jump is valid and counts as an official world record.

When ski flying began in the 1930s, jumps were recorded in a traditional Scandinavian measure of length, the Norwegian alen (1 alen (Norway) = 0.6275 m (2.059 ft)). Some older United States and Canadian records were recorded in feet. Now, jump length is measured by the meter. Today, camera technology capably makes the measurements. Before, spectators were stationed downhill, meter by meter, and the raised hand of the nearest observer marked the jumper's landing.

== Men ==
First ever recorded jump (22 November 1808)		First official jump over 100 meters in history (15 March 1936)	
(Norway) (Denmark) Olaf Rye	Lekum gård	(Austria) Sepp Bradl	Bloudkova velikanka
9.4 metres (31 feet)	Eidsberg Church (NOR)	101.5 metres (333 feet)	Planica (SLO)

First ever (but invalid) jump over 100 metres in history (17 March 1935)		First ever (but invalid) jump over 200 metres in history (17 March 1994)	
(Norway) Olav Ulland (2nd)	Trampolino del Littorio	(Austria) Andreas Goldberger	Letalnica bratov Gorišek
103.5 metres (340 feet)	Ponte di Legno (ITA)	202 metres (663 feet)	Planica (SLO)

=== Official world records ===
Progress of all valid world records by fully standing on both feet, although International Ski Federation doesn't recognize them.

Also distances set by test and trial jumpers during competition rounds are deemed official.

1 Norwegian alen = 62,94 cm (1683–1824) / 1 US ft = 30,48006096 cm (1866–1959) / 1 Norwegian ft = 31,37 cm (1875–1959)
Date	Athlete	Country	Hill	Location	m	ft	Note
22 November 1808	Olaf Rye	Norway; Denmark	Lekum gård at Eidsberg church	Eidsberg (NOR)	9.4	31	
8 March 1868	Sondre Norheim	Norway	Hauglibakken	Brunkeberg (NOR)	19.5	64	(Note: Tim Ashburner tells in the book The history of ski jumping (ISBN 1-904057-15-2, p. 14) that Norheim's longest jump in the circuit in Hauglibakken should have been measured at 50 Norwegian ells / alen (31.5 meters as one ell was then equal to 62.75 cm), but that the newspapers in Christiania stated that the length "with a certain exaggeration" should have been 30 ells (19 metres). However all statistics cites 19.5 metres as world record, which corresponds to 31 ells.)
12 February 1879	Olaf Haugann	Norway	Kastellbakken	Oslo (NOR)	20.7	68	
5(7) February 1881	S. Svalastoga	Norway	Kastellbakken	Oslo (NOR)	22	72	(Note: Hussebyrennet was held between 5–7 February 1881. To confirm the exact day of WR was set, sources from Aftenposten and other Norwegian newspaper articles needs to be searched.)
24 February 1886	Olaf Bergland	Norway	Raukleiv (Raudkleiv)	Seljord (NOR)	25.5	84	
9 March 1891	M. Hemmestveit	Norway; United States	McSorley Hill	Red Wing (US)	31.1	102	
15 January 1893	T. Hemmestveit	Norway	McSorley Hill	Red Wing (US)	31.4	103	
25 January 1897	Svein Solid	Norway	Donstadbakken (Donstadkleiva)	Morgedal (NOR)	31.5	103.4	
5 February 1899	Asbjørn Nilssen	Norway	Solbergbakken	Bærum (NOR)	32.5	107	
5 February 1899	Morten Hansen	Norway	Solbergbakken	Bærum (NOR)	32.5	107	
11 February 1900	Olaf Tandberg	Norway	Solbergbakken	Bærum (NOR)	35.5	116	
11 February 1902	Sigurd Brunæs	Norway	Gustadbakken	Geithus (NOR)	35.5	116	
9 March 1902	Nils Gjestvang	Norway	Gustadbakken	Geithus (NOR)	38	125	
9 March 1902	Nils Gjestvang	Norway	Gustadbakken	Geithus (NOR)	41	135	
10 February 1907	Gunnar Johansen	Norway	Gustadbakken	Geithus (NOR)	41	135	
24 January 1909	Oscar Gundersen	Norway	Chippewa Falls Jump	Chippewa Falls (US)	42.1	138	
21 February 1909	Harald Smith	Norway	Trampol. al campo Smith	Bardonecchia (ITA)	43	141	
28 February 1909	Harald Smith	Norway	Bolgenschanze (old)	Davos (SUI)	45	148	
18 February 1911	Anders Haugen	United States	Curry Hill	Ironwood (US)	46.3	152	
18 February 1912	Gunnar Andersen	Norway	Gustadbakken	Geithus (NOR)	47	154	
16 February 1913	Ragnar Omtvedt	United States	Curry Hill	Ironwood (US)	51.5	169	
7 February 1915	R. A. Ommundsen	Norway	Vikkollen	Mjøndalen (NOR)	54	177	
18 February 1916	Ragnar Omtvedt	United States	Howelsen Hill	Steamboat Spr. (US)	58.8	192.9	
2 March 1917	Henry Hall	United States	Howelsen Hill	Steamboat Spr. (US)	61.9	203	
9 March 1919	Anders Haugen	United States	Haugen Hill	Dillon (US)	64.9	213	
29 February 1920	Anders Haugen	United States	Haugen Hill	Dillon (US)	65.2	214	
9 February 1921	Henry Hall	United States	Big Hill	Revelstoke (CAN)	69.8	229	
4 February 1925	Nels Nelsen	Canada	Big Hill	Revelstoke (CAN)	73.1	240	
12 January 1930	Adolf Badrutt	Switzerland	Bernina-Val-Roseg	Pontresina (SUI)	75	246	
18 January 1931	Birger Ruud	Norway	Flubergbakken	Odnes (NOR)	76.5	251	
24 February 1931	Sigmund Ruud	Norway	Bolgenschanze (new)	Davos (SUI)	81.5	265.7	
19 February 1933	Sigmund Ruud	Norway	Tremplin de Bretaye	Villars (SUI)	84	276	
21 February 1933	Sigmund Ruud	Norway	Tremplin de Bretaye	Villars (SUI)	86	282	
26 February 1933	Henri Ruchet	Switzerland	Tremplin de Bretaye	Villars (SUI)	87	285	
15 March 1933	Robert Lymburne	Canada	Big Hill	Revelstoke (CAN)	87.5	287	
25 March 1934	Birger Ruud	Norway	Bloudkova velikanka	Planica (YUG)	92	302	
14 March 1935	Reidar Andersen	Norway	Bloudkova velikanka	Planica (YUG)	93	305	
15 March 1935	Stanisław Marusarz	Poland	Bloudkova velikanka	Planica (YUG)	95	312	
15 March 1935	Reidar Andersen	Norway	Bloudkova velikanka	Planica (YUG)	99	325	
15 March 1935	Reidar Andersen	Norway	Bloudkova velikanka	Planica (YUG)	99	325	
17 March 1935	Fritz Kainersdörfer	Switzerland	Tramp. del Littorio	Ponte di Legno (ITA)	99.5	326	
15 March 1936	Josef Bradl	Austria	Bloudkova velikanka	Planica (YUG)	101.5	333	
15 March 1938	Josef Bradl	Austria	Bloudkova velikanka	Planica (YUG)	107	351	
2 March 1941	Rudi Gering	Nazi Germany	Bloudkova velikanka	Planica (YUG)	108	354	
2 March 1941	Rudi Gering	Nazi Germany	Bloudkova velikanka	Planica (YUG)	118	387	
15 March 1948	Fritz Tschannen	Switzerland	Bloudkova velikanka	Planica (YUG)	120	394	
28 February 1950	Willi Gantschnigg	Austria	Heini-Klopfer	Oberstdorf (FRG)	124	407	
2 March 1950	Sepp Weiler	West Germany	Heini-Klopfer	Oberstdorf (FRG)	127	417	
3 March 1950	Andreas Däscher	Switzerland	Heini-Klopfer	Oberstdorf (FRG)	130	426.5	(Note: According to official German radio report cited in Ljudska pravica, jumps were following in that order: Andreas Däscher (130 m), then Dan Netzell (135 m) and the last Sepp Weiler (133 m).)
3 March 1950	Dan Netzell	Sweden	Heini-Klopfer	Oberstdorf (FRG)	135	443	
2 March 1951	Tauno Luiro	Finland	Heini-Klopfer	Oberstdorf (FRG)	139	456	
24 February 1961	Jože Šlibar	Yugoslavia	Heini-Klopfer	Oberstdorf (FRG)	141	463	
1 March 1962	Peter Lesser	East Germany	Kulm	Tauplitz (AUT)	141	463	
14 February 1964	Kjell Sjöberg	Sweden	Heini-Klopfer	Oberstdorf (FRG)	141	463	
15 February 1964	Dalibor Motejlek	Czechoslovakia	Heini-Klopfer	Oberstdorf (FRG)	142	466	
16 February 1964	Nilo Zandanel	Italy	Heini-Klopfer	Oberstdorf (FRG)	144	472	
21 March 1965	Peter Lesser	East Germany	Kulm	Tauplitz (AUT)	145.5	477	
12 March 1966	Bjørn Wirkola	Norway	Vikersundbakken	Vikersund (NOR)	145.5	477	
13 March 1966	Bjørn Wirkola	Norway	Vikersundbakken	Vikersund (NOR)	146	479	
10 February 1967	Lars Grini	Norway	Heini-Klopfer	Oberstdorf (FRG)	147	482	
10 February 1967	Kjell Sjöberg	Sweden	Heini-Klopfer	Oberstdorf (FRG)	148	486	
11 February 1967	Lars Grini	Norway	Heini-Klopfer	Oberstdorf (FRG)	150	492	
12 March 1967	Reinhold Bachler	Austria	Vikersundbakken	Vikersund (NOR)	154	505	
21 March 1969	Bjørn Wirkola	Norway	Velikanka bratov Gorišek	Planica (YUG)	156	512	
22 March 1969	Jiří Raška	Czechoslovakia	Velikanka bratov Gorišek	Planica (YUG)	156	512	
22 March 1969	Bjørn Wirkola	Norway	Velikanka bratov Gorišek	Planica (YUG)	160	525	
22 March 1969	Jiří Raška	Czechoslovakia	Velikanka bratov Gorišek	Planica (YUG)	164	538	
23 March 1969	Manfred Wolf	East Germany	Velikanka bratov Gorišek	Planica (YUG)	165	541	
9 March 1973	Heinz Wossipiwo	East Germany	Heini-Klopfer	Oberstdorf (FRG)	169	554	
15 March 1974	Walter Steiner	Switzerland	Velikanka bratov Gorišek	Planica (YUG)	169	554	
4 March 1976	Geir Ove Berg	Norway	Heini-Klopfer	Oberstdorf (FRG)	173	568	(Note: Geir Ove Berg's jump was first measured as 167 metres, but later corrected into 173 metres world record. It was officially published the next day)
5 March 1976	Toni Innauer	Austria	Heini-Klopfer	Oberstdorf (FRG)	174	571	
5 March 1976	Falko Weißpflog	East Germany	Heini-Klopfer	Oberstdorf (FRG)	174	571	
7 March 1976	Toni Innauer	Austria	Heini-Klopfer	Oberstdorf (FRG)	176	577	
18 March 1979	Klaus Ostwald	East Germany	Velikanka bratov Gorišek	Planica (YUG)	176	577	
27 March 1980	Armin Kogler	Austria	Čerťák	Harrachov (TCH)	176	577	
26 February 1981	Armin Kogler	Austria	Heini-Klopfer	Oberstdorf (FRG)	180	591	
19 March 1983	Pavel Ploc	Czechoslovakia	Čerťák	Harrachov (TCH)	181	594	
16 March 1984	Matti Nykänen	Finland	Heini-Klopfer	Oberstdorf (FRG)	182	597	
16 March 1984	Matti Nykänen	Finland	Heini-Klopfer	Oberstdorf (FRG)	182	597	
17 March 1984	Matti Nykänen	Finland	Heini-Klopfer	Oberstdorf (FRG)	185	607	
15 March 1985	Mike Holland	United States	Velikanka bratov Gorišek	Planica (YUG)	186	610	
15 March 1985	Matti Nykänen	Finland	Velikanka bratov Gorišek	Planica (YUG)	187	614	
15 March 1985	Matti Nykänen	Finland	Velikanka bratov Gorišek	Planica (YUG)	191	627	
9 March 1986	Andreas Felder	Austria	Kulm	Tauplitz (AUT)	191	627	
14 March 1987	Piotr Fijas	Poland	Velikanka bratov Gorišek	Planica (YUG)	194	636	
17 March 1994	Martin Höllwarth	Austria	Velikanka bratov Gorišek	Planica (SLO)	196	643	
17 March 1994	Toni Nieminen	Finland	Velikanka bratov Gorišek	Planica (SLO)	203	666	
18 March 1994	Espen Bredesen	Norway	Velikanka bratov Gorišek	Planica (SLO)	209	686	
22 March 1997	Espen Bredesen	Norway	Velikanka bratov Gorišek	Planica (SLO)	210	689	
22 March 1997	Lasse Ottesen	Norway	Velikanka bratov Gorišek	Planica (SLO)	212	696	
19 March 1999	Martin Schmitt	Germany	Velikanka bratov Gorišek	Planica (SLO)	214.5	704	
20 March 1999	T. Ingebrigtsen	Norway	Velikanka bratov Gorišek	Planica (SLO)	219.5	720	
16 March 2000	Thomas Hörl	Austria	Velikanka bratov Gorišek	Planica (SLO)	224.5	737	
18 March 2000	A. Goldberger	Austria	Velikanka bratov Gorišek	Planica (SLO)	225	738	
20 March 2003	Adam Małysz	Poland	Velikanka bratov Gorišek	Planica (SLO)	225	738	
20 March 2003	Matti Hautamäki	Finland	Velikanka bratov Gorišek	Planica (SLO)	227.5	746	
22 March 2003	Matti Hautamäki	Finland	Velikanka bratov Gorišek	Planica (SLO)	228.5	750	
23 March 2003	Matti Hautamäki	Finland	Velikanka bratov Gorišek	Planica (SLO)	231	758	
20 March 2005	T. Ingebrigtsen	Norway	Letalnica bratov Gorišek	Planica (SLO)	231	758	
20 March 2005	Bjørn E. Romøren	Norway	Letalnica bratov Gorišek	Planica (SLO)	234.5	769	
20 March 2005	Matti Hautamäki	Finland	Letalnica bratov Gorišek	Planica (SLO)	235.5	773	
20 March 2005	Bjørn E. Romøren	Norway	Letalnica bratov Gorišek	Planica (SLO)	239	784	
11 February 2011	Johan R. Evensen	Norway	Vikersundbakken	Vikersund (NOR)	243	797	
11 February 2011	Johan R. Evensen	Norway	Vikersundbakken	Vikersund (NOR)	246.5	809	
14 February 2015	Peter Prevc	Slovenia	Vikersundbakken	Vikersund (NOR)	250	820	
15 February 2015	Anders Fannemel	Norway	Vikersundbakken	Vikersund (NOR)	251.5	825	
18 March 2017	Robert Johansson	Norway	Vikersundbakken	Vikersund (NOR)	252	827	
18 March 2017	Stefan Kraft	Austria	Vikersundbakken	Vikersund (NOR)	253.5	832	
30 March 2025	Domen Prevc	Slovenia	Letalnica bratov Gorišek	Planica (SLO)	254.5	835	

=== Not recognized promo event ===
Longest ever standing distances but not recognized as official WR; as both hill and event (promo) weren't in accordance with FIS rules.

Date	Athlete	Country	Hill	Location	m	ft	Note
↓ "Unofficial Red Bull promotional event" ↓ (non FIS sanctioned; promotional only single jumper one time event in Iceland)
23 April 2024	Ryōyū Kobayashi	Japan	Hlíðarfjall - Red Bull	Akureyri (ISL)	256	840	
24 April 2024	Ryōyū Kobayashi	Japan	Hlíðarfjall - Red Bull	Akureyri (ISL)	259	850	
24 April 2024	Ryōyū Kobayashi	Japan	Hlíðarfjall - Red Bull	Akureyri (ISL)	282	925	
24 April 2024	Ryōyū Kobayashi	Japan	Hlíðarfjall - Red Bull	Akureyri (ISL)	291	955	

=== Invalid world record distances ===
Not counting if touching the ground, falling before reaching the outrun line or landing during non-competition training rounds.

F–Fall, T–Touch, P–Practise, N–Non competition, U–Unofficial, D–Disqualified, HC–Hors concours, T–Training
Date	Athlete	Country	Hill	Location	m	ft	Note
12 February 1879	Olaf Haugann	Norway	Kastellbakken	Oslo (NOR)	22	72	P (Note: In 1879 Olaf Haugann reached the distance of 22 metres during practice)
24 February 1886	J. Nordgården	Norway	Raukleiv (Raudkleiv)	Seljord (NOR)	27	89	F
10 February 1889	Richard Blichfeldt	Norway	Frognerseteren	Kristiania (NOR)	25.5	84	F
21/22 March 1891	Gustav Bye	Norway	Blybergbakken	Trondheim (NOR)	33	108.2	Claimed (Note: On 21 or 22 March 1891, Gustav Bye claimed, that he jumped 33 m in Levanger (NOR), which would then be WR. However, it is uncertain with some doubts if it was perhaps measured in Ells (1 Norwegian ell = 62.75 cm) which would be actually only 20 m.)
17 February 1894	T. Hemmestveit	Norway	McSorley Hill	Red Wing (US)	36.6	120	F
2 February 1896	Alf Staver	Norway	Solbergbakken	Bærum (NOR)	31.5	103	F
7 February 1897	Cato Aall	Norway	Solbergbakken	Bærum (NOR)	31.5	103	N
7 February 1897	Asbjørn Nilssen	Norway	Solbergbakken	Bærum (NOR)	35	115	F
1899	Trygve Smith	Norway	Solbergbakken	Bærum (NOR)	36	118	?
28 January 1900	Thor Thorsen	Norway	Blybergbakken	Trondheim (NOR)	34	112	F
11 February 1900	Aksel Refstad	Norway	Solbergbakken	Bærum (NOR)	36	118	F
11 February 1900	Aksel Refstad	Norway	Solbergbakken	Bærum (NOR)	36	118	F
25 February 1900	Aslak Solid	Norway	Donstadbakken (Donstadkleiva)	Morgedal (NOR)	36	118	F
27 January 1901	Ole Mangseth	Norway	Bjørnsvebakken	Gjøvik (NOR)	38	125	F
9 February 1902	Albert Wüller	Norway	Solbergbakken	Bærum (NOR)	36.5	120	F
11 February 1902	Hans Hovde	Norway	Gustadbakken	Geithus (NOR)	36	118	F
16 February 1902	Johan Hestnæs	Norway	Frambakken	Brumunddal (NOR)	39.5	130	F
23 February 1902	Paul Nesjø	Norway	Blybergbakken	Trondheim (NOR)	39.5	130	N
10 February 1907	Jørgen Røed	Norway	Gustadbakken	Geithus (NOR)	41	135	F
2 February 1908	A. Blomqvist	Norway	Gustadbakken	Geithus (NOR)	47	154	F
14 February 1909	Ola Brevig	Norway	Frambakken	Brumunddal (NOR)	43	141	F
28 February 1909	Trygve Smith	Norway	Bolgenschanze (old)	Davos (SUI)	46	151	F
6 February 1910	Gunnar Sundet	Norway	Gustadbakken	Geithus (NOR)	45.5	149	F
27 February 1910	Einar Jensen	Norway	Frambakken	Brumunddal (NOR)	46.5	153	F
27 February 1910	Sigurd Brevig	Norway	Frambakken	Brumunddal (NOR)	51	167	F
5 February 1911	Haakon Hansen	Norway	Gustadbakken	Geithus (NOR)	47	154	F
18 February 1911	Barney Riley	United States	Curry Hill	Ironwood (US)	46.9	154	F
4 February 1912	Halvor Rismyhr	Norway	Frambakken	Brumunddal (NOR)	49.5	162	F
18 February 1912	Oscar Gundersen	Norway	Gustadbakken	Geithus (NOR)	50	164	F
18 February 1912	James Presthus	United States	Curry Hill	Ironwood (US)	47.5	156	F
11 February 1913	Emil Knudsen	Norway	Bolgenschanze (old)	Davos (SUI)	49	161	F
16 February 1913	Ragnar Omtvedt	United States	Curry Hill	Ironwood (US)	48.2	158	Pro (Note: In 1913, Ragnar Omtvedt landed at 158 ft (48.2 m) WR distance on American Championships in Ironwood, but not recognized as this was professional competition. Later on the same day, another amateur competition for longest standing jump event was held, where Omtvedt set official WR at 169 ft (51.5 metres).)
16 February 1913	Barney Riley	United States	Curry Hill	Ironwood (US)	49.1	161	F (Note: 161 ft fall is possible WR distance. It is unclear from the article description. Depends on when was it set, before or after Omtvedt set 169 ft WR?)
16 February 1913	Barney Riley	United States	Curry Hill	Ironwood (US)	50.3	165	F (Note: 165 ft fall is possible WR distance. It is unclear from the article description. Depends on when was it set, before or after Omtvedt set 169 ft WR?)
1 February 1914	Josef Henriksen	Norway	Gustadbakken	Geithus (NOR)	52	171	F
1915	Ragnar Omtvedt	United States	Curry Hill	Ironwood (US)	56	184	U
30 January 1916	B. Wasescha	Switzerland	Selfranga-Schanze	Klosters (SUI)	58	190	F
30 January 1916	B. Wasescha	Switzerland	Selfranga-Schanze	Klosters (SUI)	60	198	Fall
5 February 1916	Nels Nelsen	Canada	Big Hill	Revelstoke (CAN)	55.8	183	U
28 February 1919	Anders Haugen	United States	Howelsen Hill	St. Springs (US)	62.2	204	F
28 February 1919	Anders Haugen	United States	Howelsen Hill	St. Springs (US)	62.5	205	F
28 February 1919	Lars Haugen	United States	Howelsen Hill	St. Springs (US)	63.7	209	F
28 February 1919	Lars Haugen	United States	Howelsen Hill	St. Springs (US)	64.6	212	F
29 February 1920	Anders Haugen	United States	Howelsen Hill	St. Springs (US)	66.4	218	F
9 February 1921	Henry Hansen	Canada	Big Hill	Revelstoke (CAN)	71.6	235	F
March 1923	Nels Nelsen	Canada	Big Hill	Revelstoke (CAN)	71.3	234	F (Note: In March 1923, Nels Nelsen fell at 234 ft (71.3 metres) world record distance on Nels Nelsen Hill in Revelstoke, Canada.)
5 February 1924	Nels Nelsen	Canada	Big Hill	Revelstoke (CAN)	71.6	235	F (Note: On 5 February 1924, Nels Nelsen touched the ground at 235 ft (71.6 metres) world record distance on Nels Nelsen Hill in Revelstoke, Canada.)
6 February 1924	Nels Nelsen	Canada	Big Hill	Revelstoke (CAN)	71.6	235	F (Note: On 6 February 1924, Nels Nelsen fell at 235 ft (71.6 metres) world record distance on Nels Nelsen Hill in Revelstoke, Canada.)
21 February 1926	Erling Andersen	Norway	Flubergbakken	Fluberg (NOR)	75	246	F
21 January 1928	Adolf Badrutt	Switzerland	Bernina-Val-Roseg	Pontresina (SUI)	73.5	241	N
11 February 1928	Franz Thannheimer	Germany	Bernina-Val-Roseg	Pontresina (ŠVI)	75	246	U.TR
18 February 1928	Jacob T. Thams	Norway	Olympiaschanze	St. Moritz (SUI)	73	240	F
2 January 1930	Adolf Badrutt	Switzerland	Bernina-Val-Roseg	Pontresina (SUI)	74.5	244	F
16 February 1930	Ernesto Zardini	(Kingdom of Italy) Kingdom Italy	Trampolino del Littorio	Ponte di Legno (ITA)	76	249	F
1 January 1931	Alf Engen	Norway; United States	Ecker Hill	Salt Lake City (US)	75.3	247	WAWSA
18 January 1931	Sverre Kolterud	Norway	Flubergbakken	Fluberg (NOR)	75.5	248	F
18 January 1931	Hans Beck	Norway	Flubergbakken	Fluberg (NOR)	76.5	251	F
18 January 1931	Birger Ruud	Norway	Flubergbakken	Fluberg (NOR)	82	269	F
January 1931	Alf Engen	Norway; United States	Ecker Hill	Salt Lake City (US)	77.4	254	WAWSA (Note: According to Harold "Cork" Anson, 254 ft (77.4 metres) world record distance set by Alf Engen on Ecker Hill in January 1931, was not recognized as WR, because Utah Ski Club was not then a member of the Western American Winter Sport Association.)
19 December 1931	Alf Engen	Norway; United States	Ecker Hill	Salt Lake City (US)	81.1	266	P (Note: 266 ft (81.1 metres) world record distance set by Alf Engen on Ecker Hill on 19 December 1931, was not recognized as WR, as it was achieved at practice, witnessed by only five people.)
February 1931	Bronisław Czech	Poland	Trampolino del Littorio	Ponte di Legno (ITA)	79.5	261	F.HC
12 March 1932	Robert Lymburne	Canada	Big Hill	Revelstoke (CAN)	82	269	U
+12 March 1932	Sigmund Ruud	Norway	Bolgenschanze (new)	Davos (SUI)	82	269	U
12 February 1933	Birger Ruud	Norway	Bergisel	Innsbruck (AUT)	82	269	F
23 March 1934	R. Sørensen	Norway	Bloudkova velikanka	Planica (YUG)	90	295.3	F
25 March 1934	Gregor Höll	Austria	Bloudkova velikanka	Planica (YUG)	89	292	F
25 March 1934	Sigmund Ruud	Norway	Bloudkova velikanka	Planica (YUG)	95	312	F
January 1935	Alf Engen	Norway; United States	Ecker Hill	Salt Lake City (US)	94.8	311	U.TR (Note: 311 ft (94.8 metres) world record distance set by Alf Engen on Ecker Hill in January 1935, was made at practice (non-sanctioned competition) and that is why it was not recognized as an official world record.)
17 March 1935	Olav Ulland	Norway; United States	Trampolino del Littorio	Ponte di Legno (ITA)	103.5	340	F
2 March 1941	Heinz Palme	Nazi Germany	Bloudkova velikanka	Planica (YUG)	109	358	T
14 March 1948	Janez Polda	Yugoslavia	Bloudkova velikanka	Planica (YUG)	120	394	T
14 March 1948	Charles Blum	Switzerland	Bloudkova velikanka	Planica (YUG)	121	397	F
2 March 1950	Hans Eder	Austria	Heini-Klopfer	Oberstdorf (FRG)	130	427	D
2 March 1950	Willi Gantschnigg	Austria	Heini-Klopfer	Oberstdorf (FRG)	130	427	F
23 March 1958	Max Bolkart	West Germany	Heini-Klopfer	Oberstdorf (FRG)	139	456	T
25 February 1961	Wolfgang Happle	West Germany	Heini-Klopfer	Oberstdorf (FRG)	145	476	F
19 March 1965	Bjørn Wirkola	Norway	Kulm	Tauplitz (AUT)	144	472	F
20 March 1965	Peter Lesser	East Germany	Kulm	Tauplitz (AUT)	147	482	F
8 March 1969	Ladislav Divila	Czechoslovakia	Vikersundbakken	Vikersund (NOR)	156	512	F
8 March 1973	J. Danneberg	East Germany	Heini-Klopfer	Oberstdorf (FRG)	166	545	F
8 March 1973	Takao Itō	Japan	Heini-Klopfer	Oberstdorf (FRG)	176	577	F
9 March 1973	Walter Steiner	Switzerland	Heini-Klopfer	Oberstdorf (FRG)	175	574	F
11 March 1973	Walter Steiner	Switzerland	Heini-Klopfer	Oberstdorf (FRG)	179	587	F
15 March 1974	Walter Steiner	Switzerland	Velikanka bratov Gorišek	Planica (YUG)	177	581	F
20 March 1977	Bogdan Norčič	Yugoslavia	Velikanka bratov Gorišek	Planica (YUG)	181	594	T
17 March 1979	Axel Zitzmann	East Germany	Velikanka bratov Gorišek	Planica (YUG)	179	587	F
13 March 1987	Andreas Felder	Austria	Velikanka bratov Gorišek	Planica (YUG)	192	630	T
23 March 1991	André Kiesewetter	Germany	Velikanka bratov Gorišek	Planica (YUG)	196	643	T
22 March 1992	Christof Duffner	Germany	Čerťák	Harrachov (TCH)	194	636	F
17 March 1994	A. Goldberger	Austria	Velikanka bratov Gorišek	Planica (SLO)	202	663	T
18 March 1994	Christof Duffner	Germany	Velikanka bratov Gorišek	Planica (SLO)	207	679	F
22 March 1997	Dieter Thoma	Germany	Velikanka bratov Gorišek	Planica (SLO)	213	699	T
19 March 1999	Martin Schmitt	Germany	Velikanka bratov Gorišek	Planica (SLO)	219	719	F
21 March 2003	V.-M. Lindström	Finland	Velikanka bratov Gorišek	Planica (SLO)	232.5	763	T
17 March 2005	Andreas Widhölzl	Austria	Letalnica bratov Gorišek	Planica (SLO)	234.5	769	F
20 March 2005	Janne Ahonen	Finland	Letalnica bratov Gorišek	Planica (SLO)	240	787	F
15 February 2015	Dmitri Vassiliev	Russia	Vikersundbakken	Vikersund (NOR)	254	833	T
16 March 2016	Tilen Bartol	Slovenia	Letalnica bratov Gorišek	Planica (SLO)	252	827	F
22 March 2018	G. Schlierenzauer	Austria	Letalnica bratov Gorišek	Planica (SLO)	253.5	832	T

Disqualified at world record distance.
Standing jumps. Not recognized as official world record.
Unclear if this was before or after Ragnar Omtvedt set WR at 169 ft.
Unclear in which unit distance was measured; ells, Norwegian feet or meters?

=== Falsely claimed world records ===
Those jumps were never actually world record distances, false claimed by some stats and media:

- 1886 — Johannes Nordgården didn't set standing WR at 26 metres, but actually crashed at 27 metres WR distance on 24 February on Flatdalbakken in Seljord Municipality. However, Olaf Berland stood at 25.5 m, which was almost certainly a WR back then.
- 1892 – 30 metres by Gustav Bye from Norway set in Blyberget in Trondheim Municipality on 11 March was never a WR. Some statistics made false claims it was in 1890, which would then actually be a world record. After this jump, anonymous reader "F2", most likely it was Fritz Huitsfeldt, the secretary of Ski Association in Oslo, wrote an open letter in Aftenposten, accusing organizers in Trondheim that they cheated at distance measuring. He got their quick response in Aftenposten on his false allegations.
- 1913 – 48 metres by Thorleif Knudsen set on Bolgenschanze at 2 March, was never a WR. Europeans then didn't believe (acknowledge) world records on North American, as two weeks earlier Ragnar Omtvedt set WR at 51.5 metres (169 ft).
- 1914 — 48.5 metres set by Norwegians Josef Henriksen and Fridolf Aas on 1 February at Gustadbakken, were never WRs. Europeans then didn't believe (acknowledge) reports from America, that year before Ragnar Omtvedt set WR at 51.5 m (169 ft).
- 1918 — claimed 62.2 metres (204 ft) by Henry Hall set on 22 February is false, as no world record was set that year at Steamboat Springs. The longest jump that year was set on Friday by Anders Haugen at 191 feet (58.2 metres).
- 1931 — Alf Engen's 231 feet (70.4 m) set on Ecker Hill on 1 January was never really WR, because Americans recognized only their records (229 ft by R. Omtdvedt). But Badrutt made 246 ft already in 1930 and Nelsen (240 ft) in 1925.
- 1931 — Alf Engen's 243 feet (74 m) set on Ecker Hill on 1 February was never really WR, because Americans recognized only their records (229 ft by R. Omtdvedt). But Badrutt made 246 ft already in 1930 and Nelsen (240 ft) in 1925.
- 1933 — Alf Engen's 281 ft (85.6 metres) set on 26 February on Ecker Hill was never WR, recognized only in America. Henri Ruchet jumped 285 ft on the same day before him and Sigmund Ruud landed at 282 ft a week earlier, both set in Villars.
- 1941 — All three jumps on 2 March in Planica in this chronological order; Lahr (111 m), Krauß (112 m) and Mair (109 m with touch) were false claimed as world records. They all performed only after Gering set WR at 118 metres, as described in Jutro.
- 1991 — There have been many rumors and false speculations over the years, that Ralph Gebstedt tied 194 metres world record on 23 March in Planica. But in fact, he only set his personal best at 190 metres.

=== Number of all 110 official world records by hills ===
WRs	Hill	Location	Country	Period
29	Letalnica bratov Gorišek (Velikanka bratov Gorišek)	Planica	Yugoslavia (11); Slovenia (18)	1969–2025
21	Heini-Klopfer-Skiflugschanze	Oberstdorf	West Germany	1950–1984
10	Bloudkova velikanka	Planica	Kingdom of Yugoslavia (9); Yugoslavia (1)	1934–1948
9	Vikersundbakken	Vikersund	Norway	1966–2017
5	Gustadbakken	Geithus	Norway	1902–1912
3	Solbergbakken	Bærum	Norway	1899–1900
3	Big Hill	Revelstoke	Canada	1921–1933
3	Tremplin de Bretaye	Villars	Switzerland	1933
3	Kulm	Tauplitz/Bad Mitterndorf	Austria	1962–1986
2	Kastellbakken	Oslo	Norway	1879–1881
2	McSorley Hill	Red Wing	United States	1891–1893
2	Curry Hill	Ironwood	United States	1911–1913
2	Howelsen Hill	Steamboat Springs	United States	1916–1917
2	Haugen Hill	Dillon	United States	1919–1920
2	Čerťák	Harrachov	Czechoslovakia	1980–1983
1	Lekum gård at Eidsberg church	Eidsberg, Indre Østfold	Norway	1808
1	Hauglibakken	Brunkeberg	Norway	1868
1	Raukleiv (Raudkleiv)	Seljord	Norway	1886
1	Donstadbakken (Donstadkleiva)	Morgedal	Norway	1897
1	Chippewa Falls Ski Jump	Chippewa Falls	United States	1909
1	Trampolino al campo Smith	Bardonecchia	Kingdom of Italy	1909
1	Bolgenschanze (old hill)	Davos	Switzerland	1909
1	Vikkollen	Mjøndalen	Norway	1915
1	Bernina-Val-Roseg-Schanze	Pontresina	Switzerland	1930
1	Flubergbakken	Fluberg/Odnes	Norway	1931
1	Bolgenschanze (new hill)	Davos	Switzerland	1931
1	Trampolino del Littorio	Ponte di Legno	Kingdom of Italy	1935

== Women ==
=== Official world records ===
Date	Athlete	Country	Hill	Location	m	ft	Note
January 1863	Ingrid O. Vestby	Norway	Nordbybakken	Trysil (NOR)	not available		
14 February 1892	Nora Glende	Norway		Spydeberg (NOR)	5.5	18	
12 March 1895	Ragnhild Pløen	Norway		Årkvisla (NOR)	12.75	42	
26 January 1902	Hilda Stang	Norway	Tranbergbakken	Gjøvik (NOR)	14.5	48	(Note: Gudbrandsdølen as the only source reported about 15.5 meters as WR (30 January 1902) all others reported about 14.5 meters for the Hilda Stang world record set in 1902 in Gjøvik)
1910	Hilda Stang	Norway	Tranbergbakken	Gjøvik (NOR)	21	69	
6 February 1910	Hilda Stang	Norway	Solbergbakken	Bærum (NOR)	22	72	
1911	Paula Lamberg	Austria-Hungary	Schattbergschanze	Kitzbühel, (AUT)	22	72	
7 February 1922	Isabel Coursier	Canada	Nels Nelsen Hill	Revelstoke (CAN)	25.6	84	
1926	Olga Balstad-Eggen	Norway	Falleberget	Arvika (SWE)	26	85	
24 January 1926	Hilda Holter	Norway	Cary Hill	Fox River Grove (US)	30.5	100	
February 1928	Isabel Coursier	Canada	Nels Nelsen Hill	Revelstoke (CAN)	31.4	103	
18 January 1931	Johanne Kolstad	Norway	Flubergbakken (Odnesbakken)	Fluberg/Odnes (NOR)	46.5	153	
17 February 1931	Johanne Kolstad	Norway	Lønnbergbakken	Raufoss (NOR)	49	161	
1932	Johanne Kolstad	Norway	Gråkallbakken	Trondheim (NOR)	62	203	
19 February 1933	Johanne Kolstad	United States		Lake Placid (USA)	62	203	
6 March 1938	Johanne Kolstad	Norway	Nansen Ski Jump	Berlin (US)	69.5	228	
17 February 1973	Anita Wold	Norway	Lønnbergbakken	Raufoss (NOR)	72	236	
22 March 1973	Anita Wold	Norway	Kløvsteinbakken	Meldal (NOR)	73	240	
1 April 1973	Anita Wold	Norway	Skuibakken	Bærum (NOR)	73	240	
3 February 1974	Anita Wold	Norway	Kløvsteinbakken	Meldal (NOR)	81	266	
3 February 1974	Anita Wold	Norway	Kløvsteinbakken	Meldal (NOR)	82.5	271	
6 March 1974	Anita Wold	Norway	Odnesbakken	Odnes (NOR)	84	276	
16 March 1974	Anita Wold	Norway	MS 1970	Štrbské Pleso (TCH)	91	299	
16 March 1974	Anita Wold	Norway	MS 1970	Štrbské Pleso (TCH)	94	308	
14 January 1975	Anita Wold	Norway	Ōkurayama	Sapporo (JPN)	97.5	320	
29 March 1981	Tiina Lehtola	Finland	Rukatunturi	Kuusamo (FIN)	110	361	
8 January 1988	Merete Kristiansen	Norway	Odnesbakken	Odnes (NOR)	112	367	
7 January 1994	Eva Ganster	Austria	Paul-Ausserleitner	Bischofshofen (AUT)	112	367	
21 February 1994	Eva Ganster	Austria	Lysgårdsbakken	Lillehammer (NOR)	113.5	372	
6 January 1997	Eva Ganster	Austria	Paul-Ausserleitner	Bischofshofen (AUT)	115	377	
4 February 1997	Eva Ganster	Austria	Kulm	Tauplitz (AUT)	144	472	
5 February 1997	Eva Ganster	Austria	Kulm	Tauplitz (AUT)	161	528	
6 February 1997	Eva Ganster	Austria	Kulm	Tauplitz (AUT)	163	535	
7 February 1997	Eva Ganster	Austria	Kulm	Tauplitz (AUT)	164.5	540	
9 February 1997	Eva Ganster	Austria	Kulm	Tauplitz (AUT)	165.5	543	
9 February 1997	Eva Ganster	Austria	Kulm	Tauplitz (AUT)	167	548	
29 January 2003	Daniela Iraschko	Austria	Kulm	Tauplitz (AUT)	188	617	
29 January 2003	Daniela Iraschko	Austria	Kulm	Tauplitz (AUT)	200	656	
18 March 2023	Ema Klinec	Slovenia	Vikersundbakken	Vikersund (NOR)	203	666	
18 March 2023	Maren Lundby	Norway	Vikersundbakken	Vikersund (NOR)	212.5	697	
18 March 2023	Alexandria Loutitt	Canada	Vikersundbakken	Vikersund (NOR)	222	728	
19 March 2023	Ema Klinec	Slovenia	Vikersundbakken	Vikersund (NOR)	226	741	
17 March 2024	Silje Opseth	Norway	Vikersundbakken	Vikersund (NOR)	230.5	756	
14 March 2025	Nika Prevc	Slovenia	Vikersundbakken	Vikersund (NOR)	236	774	
14 March 2025	Nika Prevc	Slovenia	Vikersundbakken	Vikersund (NOR)	236	774	
27 March 2026	Nika Prevc	Slovenia	Letalnica bratov Gorišek	Planica (SLO)	242.5	796	

=== Invalid world record distances (W) ===
Not counting if touching the ground, falling before reaching the outrun line or landing during non-competition training rounds.

Date	Athlete	Country	Hill	Location	m	ft	Note
17 March 2024	Silje Opseth	Norway	Vikersundbakken	Vikersund (NOR)	236.5	776	Fall

== Summer world records ==
Plastic matting for ski jumping was invented by German athlete Hans Renner. The first ski jumping tests on plastic without any audience were made on 31 October 1954 at Regenbergschanze in Zella-Mehlis, East Germany.

At the Wadeberg Jugendschanze K40 in Oberhof, East Germany, which was built just next to the old Thuringia ski jump (Thüringenschanze). Werner Lesser was the first to set a summer WR of 41 m (135 ft) on 21 November 1954.

=== Valid ===
Date	Athlete	Country	Hill	Location	m	ft
21 November 1954	Werner Lesser	East Germany	Thüringenschanze K40	Oberhof (DDR)	41	135
21 November 1954	Werner Lesser	East Germany	Thüringenschanze K40	Oberhof (DDR)	42	138
30 September 1973	Heinz Wossipiwo	East Germany	Areal Horečky K90	Frenštát (TCH)	84	276
30 September 1973	Heinz Wossipiwo	East Germany	Areal Horečky K90	Frenštát (TCH)	86	282
6 August 1979	Holger Greiner-Petter	East Germany	Kanzlersgrund	Oberhof (DDR)	97	318
7 August 1979	Jochen Danneberg	East Germany	Kanzlersgrund	Oberhof (DDR)	110	361
31 October 1993	Noriaki Kasai	Japan	Olympic Hills K120	Hakuba (JPN)	126.5	415
25 September 1994	Takehito Suda	Japan	Olympic Hills K120	Hakuba (JPN)	127	417
20 August 1995	Rico Meinel	Germany	Granåsen K120	Trondheim (NOR)	130.5	428
18 August 1996	Ari-Pekka Nikkola	Finland	Granåsen K120	Trondheim (NOR)	131	430
17 August 1997	Kazuyoshi Funaki	Japan	Granåsen K120	Trondheim (NOR)	132.5	435
5 September 2004	Daniel Forfang	Norway	Wielka Krokiew HS134	Zakopane (POL)	139.5	458
2 September 2005	Petter Tande	Norway	Paul-Ausserleitner HS140	Bischofshofen (AUT)	142	466
16 August 2007	Gregor Schlierenzauer	Austria	Trempolino a Monte HS140	Pragelato (ITA)	143.5	471
2 September 2007	Bernhard Gruber	Austria	Paul-Ausserleitner HS140	Bischofshofen (AUT)	143.5	471
5 October 2007	Gregor Schlierenzauer	Austria	Vogtland Arena HS140	Klingenthal (GER)	146	479
2 October 2009	Harri Olli	Finland	Vogtland Arena HS140	Klingenthal (GER)	146	479
23 September 2011	Vegard Haukø Sklett	Norway	Vogtland Arena HS140	Klingenthal (GER)	147	482
15 October 2016	Dimitry Vassiliev	Russia	RusSki Gorki HS140	Sochi (RUS)	147.5	484
11 July 2018	Sergey Tkachenko	Kazakhstan	Burabay Ski Jumps HS140	Shchuchinsk (KAZ)	151	495

=== Invalid ===
Date	Athlete	Country	Hill	Location	m	ft	Note
21 August 2013	Sarah Hendrickson	United States	Schattenbergschanze HS137	Oberstdorf (GER)	148	486	Ladies
11 July 2018	Jurij Tepeš	Slovenia	Burabay Ski Jumps HS140	Shchuchinsk (KAZ)	154	505	Men

== All jumps over 250 metres ==
As of June 2026

No.	Date	Athlete	Country	Hill	Size	Location	Length
↓ official jumps ↓
1	14 February 2015	Peter Prevc	Slovenia	Vikersundbakken	HS225	Vikersund	250 m (ex)
2	15 February 2015	Anders Fannemel	Norway	Vikersundbakken	HS225	Vikersund	251.5 m (ex)
3	18 March 2017	Robert Johansson	Norway	Vikersundbakken	HS225	Vikersund	252 m (ex)
4	18 March 2017	Stefan Kraft	Austria	Vikersundbakken	HS225	Vikersund	253.5 m (ex)
5	25 March 2017	Robert Johansson	Norway	Letalnica bratov Gorišek	HS225	Planica	250 m
6	25 March 2017	Stefan Kraft	Austria	Letalnica bratov Gorišek	HS225	Planica	251 m
7	25 March 2017	Kamil Stoch	Poland	Letalnica bratov Gorišek	HS225	Planica	251.5 m
8	26 March 2017	Stefan Kraft	Austria	Letalnica bratov Gorišek	HS225	Planica	250 m
9	24 March 2019	Ryoyu Kobayashi	Japan	Letalnica bratov Gorišek	HS240	Planica	252.0 m
10	30 March 2025	Domen Prevc	Slovenia	Letalnica bratov Gorišek	HS240	Planica	254.5 m
↓ unofficial Red Bull exhibition jumps ↓
1	23 April 2024	Ryoyu Kobayashi	Japan	Hlíðarfjall - Red Bull	Undet.	Akureyri	256 m (unofficial WR)
2	24 April 2024	Ryoyu Kobayashi	Japan	Hlíðarfjall - Red Bull	Undet.	Akureyri	259 m (unofficial WR)
3	24 April 2024	Ryoyu Kobayashi	Japan	Hlíðarfjall - Red Bull	Undet.	Akureyri	282 m (unofficial WR)
4	24 April 2024	Ryoyu Kobayashi	Japan	Hlíðarfjall - Red Bull	Undet.	Akureyri	291 m (unofficial WR)
↓ invalid jumps ↓
1	15 February 2015	Dimitry Vassiliev	Russia	Vikersundbakken	HS225	Vikersund	254 m (WR fall)
2	16 March 2016	Tilen Bartol	Slovenia	Letalnica bratov Gorišek	HS225	Planica	252 m (test: WR fall)
3	22 March 2018	G. Schlierenzauer	Austria	Letalnica bratov Gorišek	HS240	Planica	253.5 m (WR fall)

=== Most jumps over 250 metres ===
As of 30 March 2025, including invalid jumps:

Rank	Athlete	Country	≥ 250 m	Longest jump
1	Stefan Kraft	Austria	3	253.5 m (former)
2	Robert Johansson	Norway	2	252 m (former)
3	Domen Prevc	Slovenia	1	254.5 m
	Ryoyu Kobayashi	Japan	1	252.0 m
	Anders Fannemel	Norway	1	251.5 m (former)
	Kamil Stoch	Poland	1	251.5 m
	Peter Prevc	Slovenia	1	250 m (former)
	Dimitry Vassiliev	Russia	1	254 m (WR fall)
	G. Schlierenzauer	Austria	1	253.5 m (WR fall)
	Tilen Bartol	Slovenia	1	252 m (test: WR fall)

== All female jumps over 225 metres ==
=== By date ===
No.	Date	Athlete	Country	Hill	Size	Location	Length
1	19 March 2023	Ema Klinec	Slovenia	Vikersundbakken	HS240	Vikersund	226 m
2	19 March 2023	Alexandria Loutitt	Canada	Vikersundbakken	HS240	Vikersund	225 m
3	17 March 2024	Silje Opseth	Norway	Vikersundbakken	HS240	Vikersund	236.5 m (WR fall)
4	17 March 2024	Silje Opseth	Norway	Vikersundbakken	HS240	Vikersund	230.5 m
5	14 March 2025	Nika Prevc	Slovenia	Vikersundbakken	HS240	Vikersund	236 m
6	14 March 2025	Nika Prevc	Slovenia	Vikersundbakken	HS240	Vikersund	236 m
7	21 March 2026	Ringo Miyajima	Japan	Vikersundbakken	HS240	Vikersund	228.5 m (
8	21 March 2026	Nika Prevc	Slovenia	Vikersundbakken	HS240	Vikersund	227.5 m
9	21 March 2026	Frida Westman	Sweden	Vikersundbakken	HS240	Vikersund	225 m
10	21 March 2026	Anna Odine Strøm	Norway	Vikersundbakken	HS240	Vikersund	235.5 m
11	21 March 2026	Frida Westman	Sweden	Vikersundbakken	HS240	Vikersund	225 m
12	22 March 2026	Anna Odine Strøm	Norway	Vikersundbakken	HS240	Vikersund	234 m
13	22 March 2026	Nika Prevc	Slovenia	Vikersundbakken	HS240	Vikersund	235.5 m
14	22 March 2026	Eirin Maria Kvandal	Norway	Vikersundbakken	HS240	Vikersund	231.5 m
15	22 March 2026	Heidi Dyhre Traaserud	Norway	Vikersundbakken	HS240	Vikersund	233.5 m
16	22 March 2026	Selina Freitag	Germany	Vikersundbakken	HS240	Vikersund	227.5 m
17	27 March 2026	Nika Prevc	Slovenia	Letalnica bratov Gorišek	HS240	Planica	242.5 m
18	27 March 2026	Eirin Maria Kvandal	Norway	Letalnica bratov Gorišek	HS240	Planica	226 m
19	28 March 2026	Nika Prevc	Slovenia	Letalnica bratov Gorišek	HS240	Planica	228.5 m

=== Most female jumps over 225 metres ===
Rank	Athlete	Country	≥ 210 m	Longest jump
1	Nika Prevc	Slovenia	6	242.5 m
2	Anna Odine Strøm	Norway	2	235.5 m
	Silje Opseth	Norway	2	230.5 m
	Frida Westman	Sweden	2	225 m
	Eirin Maria Kvandal	Norway	2	231.5 m
6	Heidi Dyhre Traaserud	Norway	1	233.5 m
	Ringo Miyajima	Japan	1	228.5 m
	Selina Freitag	Germany	1	227.5 m
	Ema Klinec	Slovenia	1	226 m
	Alexandria Loutitt	Canada	1	225 m

- updated: 22 March 2026
