= Bolgenschanze =

Bolgenschanze may refer to either one of two abandoned ski jumping hills in Davos, Switzerland.

- Bolgenschanze (1909, old hill), a ski jumping hill closed in the 1950s
- Bolgenschanze (1928, new hill), a ski jumping hill closed in 1964
