= Donstadbakken =

Ski jump location for competition

Donstadbakken (Donstadkleiva)
- Location: Donstad, Morgedal, Norway
- Coordinates: 59°28′40.44″N 8°24′12.96″E

Size
- K–point: K30
- Hill record: 31.5 m (103 ft) (Norway) Svein Solid (25 January 1897)

Donstadbakken (also: Donstadkleiva) was a K30 ski jumping hill located in Donstad, Morgedal, Norway where world record was set in 1897.

== History ==
On 25 January 1887, Svein Solid set the official world record on Donstadbakken at 31.5 metres (103.4 feet).

On 25 February 1900, Aslak Solid made a world record distance jump at 36 metres (118 feet), but he crashed and it didn't count as record.

== Ski jumping world records ==
No.	Date	Name	Country	Metres	Feet
#8	25 January 1897	Svein Solid	Norway	31.5	103.4
F	25 February 1900	Aslak Solid	Norway	36	118

Not recognized! Crash at world record distance.
