= Flubergbakken =

Ski jumping hill in Norway

Flubergbakken Odnesbakken
- Location: Fluberg / Odnes, Norway
- Coordinates: 60°48′25.2″N 10°12′26.1″E
- Operator: Fluberg IL
- Opened: 1926
- Renovated: 1955, 1985, 2002
- Closed: 2008

Size
- K–point: K105
- Hill size: HS117
- Hill record: 122.5 m (402 ft); Magnus Rostad

Flubergbakken (also Odnesbakken) was a HS117 ski jumping hill located between Fluberg and Odnes in Norway, opened in 1926. It was part of Odnes Ski Senter and owned by Fluberg IL Ski Club.

Hill was renovated in 1955, 1985, 2002, then demolished in 2008. They hosted nine Norwegian National Championships in 1969, 1972, 1977, 1981, 1987, 1989, 1990, 1993 and 2002.

== History ==
On 21 February 1926, Norweg Erling Andersen fell at 75 meters (246 feet) world record distance.

On 18 February 1931, four invalid and two official world records were set on this hill that day, all by Norwegian ski jumpers. First Sverre Kolterud fell at world record distance at 75.5 m (248 ft), Hans Beck at 76.5 m (251 ft); and Birger Ruud as last one with fall at record 82 meters (269 feet), then with only official WR at 76.5 meters (251 feet). Johanne Kolstad also set the official world record for ladies at 46.5 meters (153 feet).

== Ski jumping world records ==
=== Men ===
No.	Date	Name	Country	Metres	Feet
F	21 February 1926	Erling Andersen	Norway	75	246
F	18 January 1931	Sverre Kolterud	Norway	75.5	248
F	18 January 1931	Hans Beck	Norway	76.5	251
F	18 January 1931	Birger Ruud	Norway	82	269
#30	18 January 1931	Birger Ruud	Norway	76.5	251

Not recognized! Fall at world record distance.

=== Ladies ===
No.	Date	Name	Country	Metres	Feet
#10	18 January 1931	Johanne Kolstad	Norway	46.5	153

== Competitions ==
=== Flubergrennet ===
1976 race was organized on another hill.

Date	Winner	Second place	Third place	Ref.
13 March 1968	(Norway) Bjørn Wirkola	(Norway) Lars Grini	(Norway) Jan Olav Roaldseth	
11 March 1969	(Czechoslovakia) Jiří Raška	(Norway) Bjørn Wirkola	(Czechoslovakia) Rudolf Höhnl	
11 March 1970	(Czechoslovakia) Rudolf Höhnl	(Poland) Stanisław G. Daniel	(Norway) Tom Nyberg	
11 March 1971	(Czechoslovakia) Jiří Raška	(Norway) Frithjof Prydz	(Soviet Union) Jurij Kalinin	
9 March 1972	(Switzerland) Hans Schmid	(Austria) Rudi Wanner	(Norway) Lars Grini	
14 March 1973	lack of snow; moved to Balbergbakken and canceled for same reason			
6 March 1974	(Norway) Johan Sætre	(West Germany) Alfred Grosche	(Sweden) Christer Karlsson	
6 March 1975	(Austria) Willi Pürstl	(West Germany) Alfred Grosche	(Norway) Johan Sætre	
10 March 1976	(Austria) Toni Innauer	(Austria) Karl Schnabl	(Norway) Johan Sætre	
9 March 1977	(Soviet Union) Jurij Ivanov	(East Germany) Thomas Meisinger	(East Germany) Matthias Buse	
8 March 1978	(Switzerland) Walter Steiner	(Switzerland) Robert Mösching	(East Germany) Klaus Ostwald	
7 March 1979	(Norway) Johan Sætre	(Norway) Per Steinar Nordlien	(Norway) Ulf Jørgensen	

=== National Championships ===
Year	Winner	Second place	Third place	Hill
1969	(Norway) Erling Stranden	(Norway) Bjørn Wirkola	(Norway) Ingolf Mork	LH
1972	(Norway) Frithjof Prydz	(Norway) Ingolf Mork	(Norway) Bjørn Wirkola	LH
1977	(Norway) Johan Sætre	(Norway) Roger Ruud	(Norway) Per Bergerud	LH
1981	(Norway) Roger Ruud	(Norway) Tom Levorstad	(Norway) Johan Sætre	LH
1987	(Norway) Ole Gunnar Fidjestøl	(Norway) Vegard Opaas	(Norway) Hroar Stjernen	LH
1989	(Norway) Ole Gunnar Fidjestøl	(Norway) Erik Johnsen	(Norway) Kent Johanssen	LH
1990	(Norway) Ole Gunnar Fidjestøl	(Norway) Magne Johansen	(Norway) Rune Olijnyk	NH
1990	(Norway) Buskerud Lars Meløe; Harald Sørensen; Stein Gruben; Ole Gunnar Fidjestøl	(Norway) Oslo Ole Fredrik Melleby; Henning Wold; Espen Bredesen; Kent Johanssen	(Norway) Sør-Trøndelag Ole Christian Eidhammer; Kåre Herrem; Magne Johansen; Ståle Fjorden	NH
1993	(Norway) Espen Bredesen	(Norway) Bjørn Myrbakken	(Norway) Stian Kvarstad	LH
2002	(Norway) Anders Bardal	(Norway) Jan Ottar Andersen	(Norway) Bjørn Einar Romøren	LH
