= Trampolino al campo Smith =

Ski jumping hill in Italy

- Location: Bardonecchia, Italy
- Coordinates: 45°04′08″N 06°41′47″E
- Opened: 1908

Size
- K–point: K40
- Hill record: 43 m (141 ft) (Norway) Harald Smith (24 January 1909)

Trampolino al campo Smith was a K40 ski jumping hill located in Bardonecchia, Italy.

== History ==
On 21 February 1909, Harald Smith set the only official world record on this hill at 43 metres (141 feet).

== Ski jumping world record ==
No.	Date	Name	Country	Metres	Feet
#17	21 February 1909	Harald Smith	Norway	43	141
