= Gunnar Andersen =

Norwegian footballer and ski jumper (1890–1968)

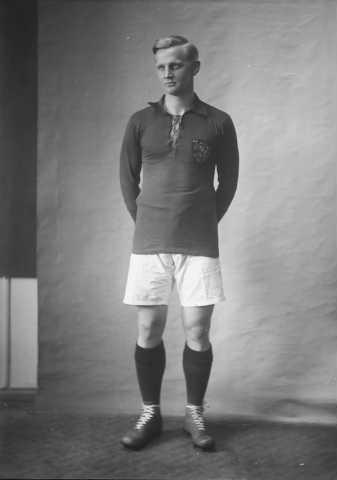
- Born: 18 March 1890; Drøbak, Norway
- Died: 25 April 1968 (aged 78); Oslo, Norway
Association football career
Senior career*
Years	Team	Apps	(Gls)
- Lyn
International career
1911–1924	Norway	46	(0)
- * Club domestic league appearances and goals
- Skiing career
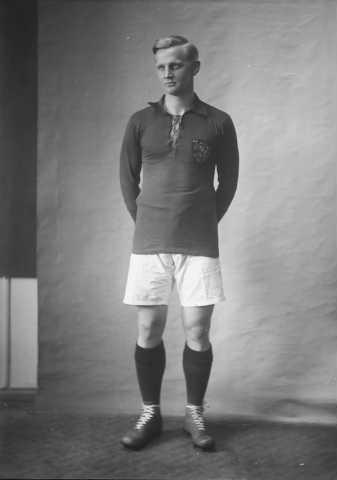
- Sport: Skiing

Sports achievements and titles
- Personal bests: 47.5 metres (156 ft); Geithus, Modum, Norway (1912)

Gunnar Andersen (18 March 1890 – 25 April 1968) was a Norwegian footballer and ski jumper. In 1918 he became the first to receive the Egebergs Ærespris, an award presented to Norwegian athletes who excel at two (or more) different sports.

== Football career ==
Andersen was a member of Lyn, and was capped 46 times for Norway, the national record at the time. He participated in two Summer Olympics; Stockholm 1912 and Antwerp 1920. Captaining the Norwegian football team in 1920, they beat the 1908 and 1912 gold medalists Great Britain and Ireland 3–1.

== Skiing career ==
As a ski jumper Gunnar Andersen set a world record when he jumped 47.5 metres (156 ft) in Gustadbakken, Modum, 1912. He represented Lyn here as well.

== Ski jumping world records ==
Date	Hill	Location	Metres	Feet
10 February 1907	Gustadbakken	Geithus, Modum, Norway	41	135
1912	Gustadbakken	Geithus, Modum, Norway	47.5	156

Not recognized! However, he stood at world record distance.

Preceded by None	Egebergs Ærespris; 1918	Succeeded by Helge Løvland
