= Gustadbakken =

Defunct ski jumping hill located at Geithus, Norway

- Location: Geithus, Modum, Norway
- Coordinates: 59°54′37″N 9°57′38″E
- Opened: 1902
- Closed: 1964
- Demolished: yes

Size
- K–point: K81
- Hill record: 71.5 m (235 ft); Erling Kroken (1951)

Gustadbakken was a K81 ski jumping hill located at Geithus, Modum, Norway. Five official world records were set on the hill between 1902 and 1912.

== History ==
Owned by Modum SK, Geithus IL, situated just a few kilometres away from Vikersundbakken, it had a K-point at 81 meters at the end. It was opened in 1902 and closed in 1964, later demolished.

On 11 February 1902, Sigurd Brunæs from Norway set the first official world record on this hill at 35.5 metres (116 ft) and the same day his fellow Hans Hovde crashed at 36 metres (118 ft) WR distance.

On 9 March 1902, another Norwegian Nils Gjestvang set another world records improving the distance at 38.5 metres (126 feet) and 41 metres (135 feet).

On 10 February 1907, Gunnar Johansen from Norway tied the last world set on this same hill five years ago at 41 metres (135 feet).

From 1908 to 1914 four invalid world records with falls were set by Norwegians; A. Blomqvist crashed at 47 metres (154 ft), Gunnar Sundet at 45.5 m (149 ft), Haakon Hansen at 47 m (154 ft) and Josef Henriksen at 52 m (171 ft).

On 18 February 1912, Gunnar Andersen from Norway set the fifth and the last world record on this hill at 47 metres (154 feet) and his fellow Oscar Gundersen crashed at 50 metres (164 ft) world record distance on the same day.

In 1930s hill's K-point was enlarged at K60 meters. In 1951 the last and all-time hill record was set by Norwegian Erling Kroken at 71.5 meters (235 ft).

== Ski jumping world records ==
No.	Date	Name	Country	Metres	Feet
#12	11 February 1902	Sigurd Brunæs	Norway	35.5	116
F	11 February 1902	Hans Hovde	Norway	36	118
#13	9 March 1902	Nils Gjestvang	Norway	38.5	126
#14	9 March 1902	Nils Gjestvang	Norway	41	135
#15	10 February 1907	Gunnar Johansen	Norway	41	135
F	2 February 1908	A. Blomqvist	Norway	47	154
F	6 February 1910	Gunnar Sundet	Norway	45.5	149
F	5 February 1911	Haakon Hansen	Norway	47	154
#20	18 February 1912	Gunnar Andersen	Norway	47	154
F	18 February 1912	Oscar Gundersen	Norway	50	164
F	1 February 1914	Josef Henriksen	Norway	52	171

Not recognized! Fall at world record distance.
