= Kastellbakken =

Ski jumping hill in Ullern, Oslo, Norway

Coordinates: 59°56′14″N 10°40′21″E

Kastellbakken Husebybakken
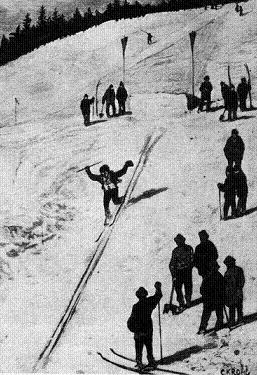
- Drawing by Christian Krohg from 1879
- Location: Ullern, Oslo, Norway
- Opened: 12 February 1879

Size
- K–point: K20
- Hill record: 22 m (72 ft) (Norway) Sveinung Svalastoga (5–7 February 1881)

Kastellbakken (later renamed into Husebybakken) is an abandoned, but first modern ski jumping hill in history, opened in 1879. It was located at Ullern in Oslo, Norway.

It was the venue of Husebyrennet, Norway's and the world's most prestigious Nordic skiing tournament between 1879 and 1891. Due to lack of snow, there were no events in 1880 and 1882.

== History ==
=== 1879: Opening event with WR ===
On 12 February 1879, the premiere Husseby race took place in front of 10,000 spectators. Among them there were Norwegian king King Oscar II and his guest Prince Hans of Denmark who had never seen skiing before that. Olaf Haugan made and incredible jump of 20.7 metres (66 Norwegian ft) and set a new official world record. During practice Haugan already jumped 22 metres, which didn't count as WR.

The runner-up was Torjus Hemmestveit. This was the groundbreaking event for the future of this sport where twenty metres barrier was broken for the first time on the first ever modern ski jumping hill.

=== 1881: Another world record ===
Between 5 and 7 February 1881, the second Husseby race was held. It is unclear on which day the ski jumping competition took place, when Norwegian Sveinung Svalastoga set the world record at 22 metres (72 ft).

=== 1891: Last Huseby event ===
In 1892, the tournament moved to Holmenkollbakken and was renamed the Holmenkollen Ski Festival, the oldest and most prestigious Nordic skiing competition in the world still running to this day.

== Ski jumping world records ==
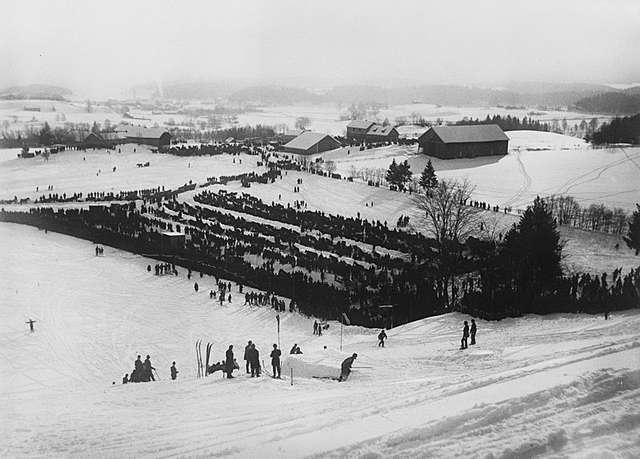
Photo from 1923

No.	Date	Name	Country	Metres	Feet
PR	12 February 1879	Olaf Haugann	Norway	22	72
#3	12 February 1879	Olaf Haugann	Norway	20.7	68
#4	5–7 February 1881	Sveinung Svalastoga	Norway	22	72

Not recognized! Although landing on both feet, record distance was set at practise.
