= Birger Ruud =

Norwegian ski jumper (1911–1998)

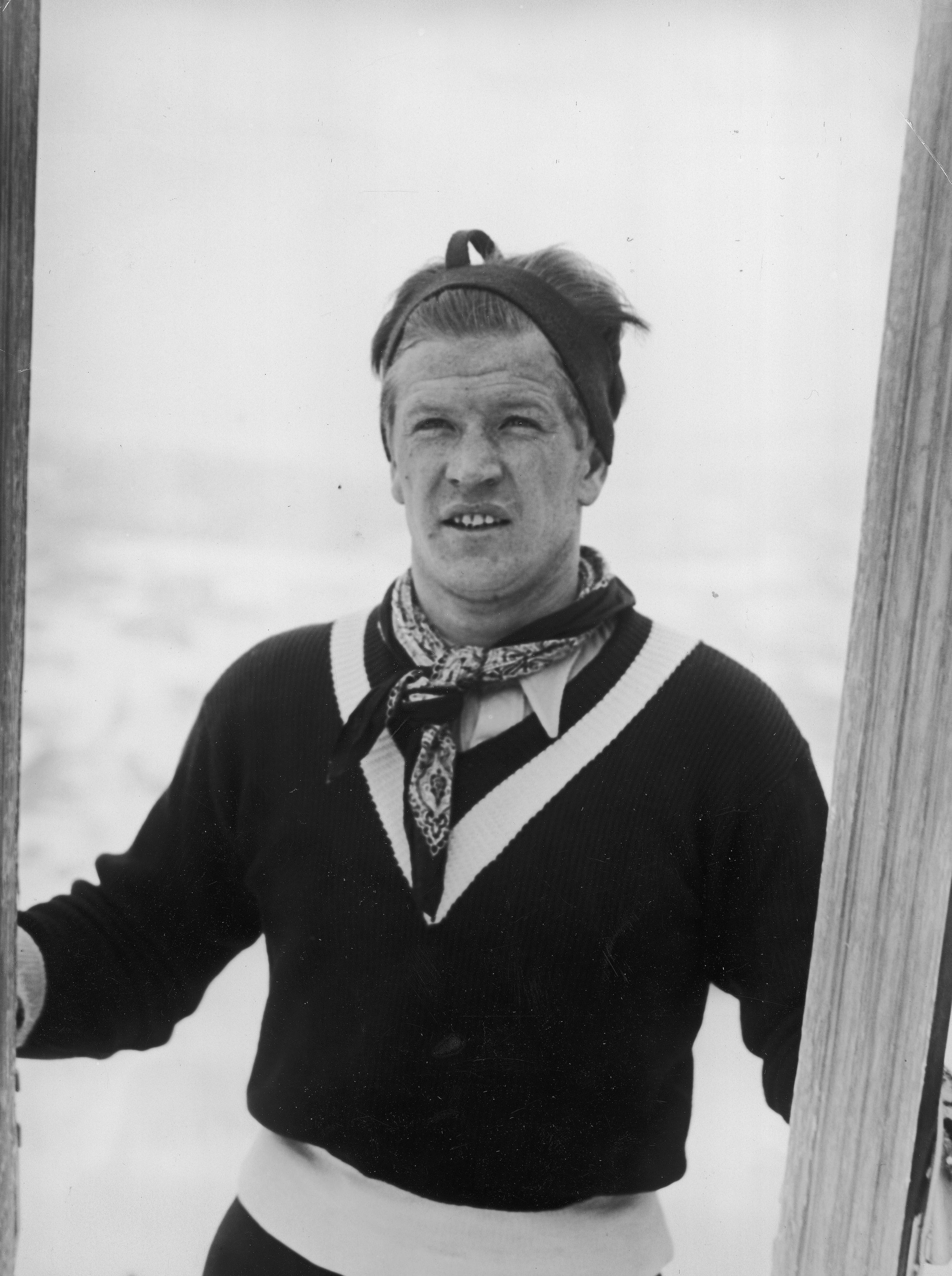
- Ruud in 1936

Personal information
- Full name: Birger Johannes Ruud
- Born: 23 August 1911 Kongsberg, Norway
- Died: 13 June 1998 (aged 86) Kongsberg, Norway

Sport
- Sport: Skiing

Achievements and titles
- Personal bests: 92 m (302 ft); Planica, Yugoslavia (25 March 1934)
Medal record
Representing Norway
Men's ski jumping
Olympic Games
Gold medal – first place	1932 Lake Placid	Individual LH
Gold medal – first place	1936 Garmisch-Partenkirchen	Individual LH
Silver medal – second place	1948 St. Moritz	Individual LH
World Championships
Gold medal – first place	1931 Oberhof	Individual LH
Gold medal – first place	1932 Lake Placid	Individual LH
Gold medal – first place	1935 Vysoké Tatry	Individual LH
Gold medal – first place	1936 Garmisch-Partenkirchen	Individual LH
Gold medal – first place	1937 Chamonix	Individual LH
Silver medal – second place	1939 Zakopane	Individual LH
Silver medal – second place	1948 St. Moritz	Individual LH
Men's alpine skiing
World Championships
Bronze medal – third place	1935 Mürren	Alpine combined

Birger Johannes Ruud (23 August 1911 – 13 June 1998) was a Norwegian ski jumper and alpine skier.

== Career ==
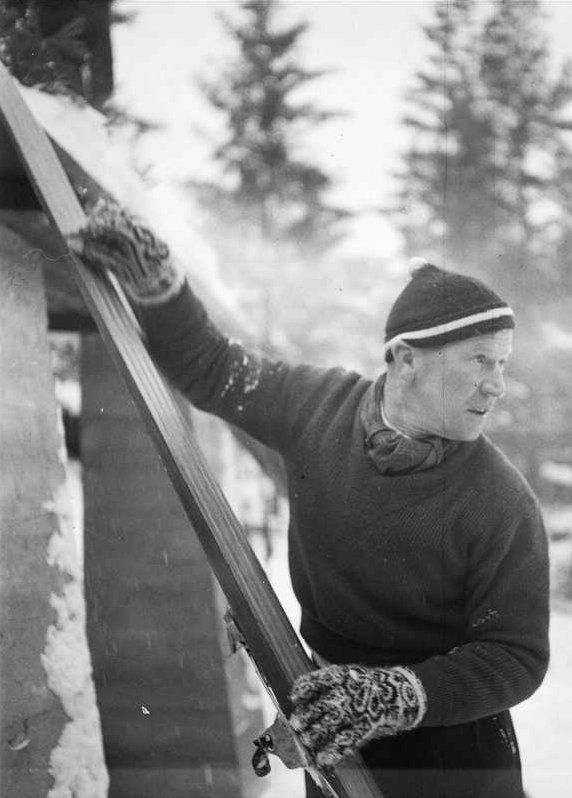
Birger Ruud in 1949

Born in Kongsberg, Birger Ruud, with his brothers Sigmund and Asbjørn, dominated international jumping in the 1930s, winning three world championships in 1931, 1935 and 1937.

Ruud also won the Olympic gold medal in 1932 and 1936, the first repeat winner of ski jumping gold. He also was an accomplished alpine skier, winning a bronze medal in the combined at the 1935 world championships. Ruud won the Holmenkollen ski jumping competition in 1934 and shared the Holmenkollen medal in 1937 with Olaf Hoffsbakken and Martin P. Vangsli.

In 1943, during the German occupation of Norway, Ruud was incarcerated at Grini concentration camp for expressing his anti-Nazi sentiments. After his release in 1944, he joined the Norwegian resistance movement. He also competed in the 1948 Olympics, winning the ski jumping silver medal at age 36, though he was initially only at the Games as assistant coach of Norway's ski jumping team. This accomplishment he personally held in the highest regard; it made him the first ski jumper to medal in three different Olympics. Ruud is also the only ski jumper to have won Olympic medals before and after the war and furthermore the one with the longest time period between winning medals at the Olympics (twelve years).

Twice he set ski jumping world records: 76.5 m (250.98 ft) in Odnesbakken in 1931, and 92 m (301.84 ft) in Planica in 1934.

Later in life, Birger Ruud, with his friend Petter Hugsted, the 1948 gold medalist, participated in the creation of the Kongsberg Skiing Museum.

In 1987, a bronze sculpture of Birger Ruud, by the Norwegian sculptor Per Ung, was set up in Ruud's native town of Kongsberg, and in 1991 he was awarded the Egebergs Ærespris for his achievements in ski jumping and alpine skiing. Ruud was selected to light the Olympic Flame at the 1994 Lillehammer Olympics in Norway, but had to withdraw due to heart complications immediately before the event. He died in 1998, aged 86.

== Ski jumping world records ==
Date	Hill	Location	Metres	Feet
18 January 1931	Odnesbakken	Odnes, Norway	76.5	251
24 March 1934	Bloudkova velikanka K90	Planica, Kingdom of Yugoslavia	87	285
25 March 1934	Bloudkova velikanka K90	Planica, Kingdom of Yugoslavia	92	302

Not recognized! Crash at world record distance.

Preceded by Grete Ingeborg Nykkelmo	Egebergs Ærespris; 1991	Succeeded by Ingrid Kristiansen
