= Hauglibakken =

Abandoned ski jumping hill

- Location: Brunkeberg, Norway
- Coordinates: 59°26′18″N 8°29′10″E
- Opened: 8 March 1868

Size
- K–point: K20
- Hill record: 19.5 m (64 ft) (Norway) Sondre Norheim (8 March 1868)

Hauglibakken is an abandoned ski jumping hill located in Brunkeberg, Norway opened in 1868.

== History ==
Sondre Norheim set the second men's ski jumping world record in history and only one on this hill with 19.5 meters (64 ft) on 8 March 1868.

Originally, distance was measured in ells, an old Norwegian unit. One Norwegian ell (alen) equaled 62.75 centimetres. The first recorded ski jump was originally measured at 31 ells (19.5 metres). (Note: Tim Ashburner tells in the book The history of ski jumping (ISBN 1-904057-15-2, p. 14) that Norheim's longest jump in the circuit in Hauglibakken should have been measured at 50 Norwegian ells / alen (31.5 meters as one ell was then equal to 62.75 cm), but that the newspapers in Christiania stated that the length "with a certain exaggeration" should have been 30 ells (19 metres). However all statistics cites 19.5 metres as the world record, which corresponds to 31 ells.)

In 1986, Morgedal IL club, built two new K20 and K40 hills, called Hauglandsbakken, on the exact same spot as the old historic hill. They are now also abandoned.

== Ski jumping world record ==
No.	Date	Ski jumper	Country	Ells	Metres	Feet
#2	8 March 1868	Sondre Norheim	Norway	31	19.5	64
