= Sondre Norheim =

Norwegian skier (1825–1897)

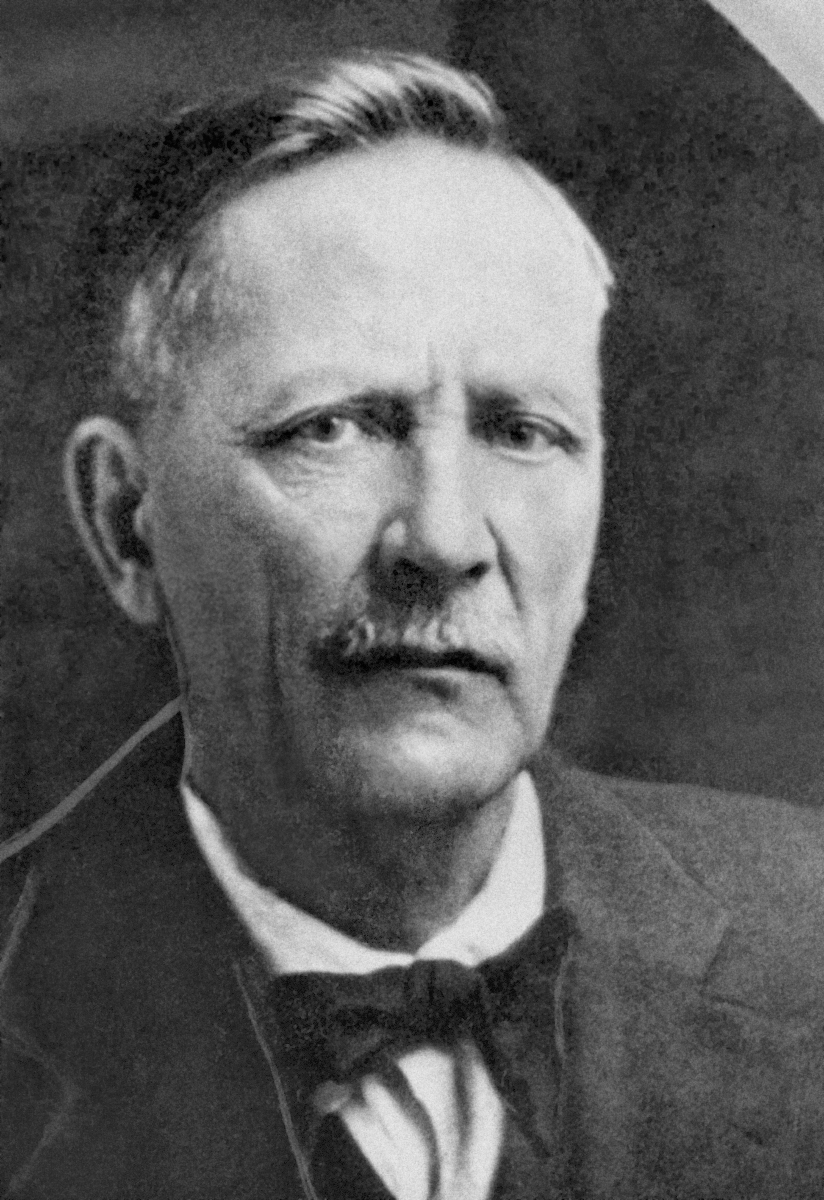
- Photograph of Sondre Norheim ca. 1880

Personal information
- Nationality: Norway
- Born: 10 June 1825 Morgedal, Telemark, Norway
- Died: 9 March 1897 (aged 71) North Dakota, US

Sport
- Sport: Skiing

Achievements and titles
- Personal bests: 19.5 m (64 ft); Brunkeberg, Norway (8 March 1868)

Sondre Norheim, born Sondre Auverson, (10 June 1825 – 9 March 1897) was a Norwegian skier and pioneer of modern skiing. Sondre Norheim is known as the father of Telemark skiing.

== Background ==
Sondre Auverson was born at Øverbø, a little cotter's farm and raised in Morgedal in Kviteseid in Telemark, Norway. Skiing was a popular activity in Morgedal. Sondre took to downhill skiing as a recreational activity, rising to local fame for his skills. He made important innovations in skiing technology by designing new equipment, such as different bindings and shorter skis with curved sides to facilitate turns. He also designed the Telemark ski, which is the prototype of all those now produced. Sondre Norheim was regarded by his contemporaries as a master of the art of skiing. He combined ordinary skiing with jumping and slalom. In 1868 he won the first national skiing competition in Christiania, beating his younger competitors by a large margin. His reputation grew, and eventually made Norwegian words like ski and slalåm (slalom) known worldwide.

== Personal life ==
On 15 January 1854 Sondre Norheim married Rannei Åmundsdotter from a cotter's farm at Øyfjell, a neighbouring village. In March 1854 their first daughter, Ingerid, was born. The next year little Hæge came, but she died at 15 weeks old. The next year Olav was born, and then another daughter they called Hæge, then Anne, Auver, Åmund and Talleiv. Sondre and Rannei lost a second child when Auver died at age 12. The family moved around to different places in Morgedal. Their last place was called "Norheim", which Sondre took as a new family name.

== Emigration ==
On 30 May 1884 Sondre and Rannei left Norway together with three of their children– Anne (21), Åmund (14) and Talleiv (12). Their son Olav and daughter Hæge had left home previously, and their eldest daughter Ingerid decided to stay back home. Norheim followed in the footsteps of many of his neighbors in Morgedal and emigrated from Norway to the United States. After having first settled in Minnesota, they moved to North Dakota, near Villard in McHenry County. He continued to ski when he could, though the climate and flat topography of the Dakota prairie offered few opportunities for downhill skiing. It was said he always had a pair of skis placed outside his door. Norheim grew more religious with age and helped build a Lutheran church in Villard. He died in 1897 and was buried in Denbigh, McHenry County, North Dakota.

== Legacy ==
Sondre Norheim was honored during opening ceremonies at the 1952 Winter Olympics in Oslo, at the 1960 Winter Olympics in Squaw Valley, California and at the 1994 Winter Olympics in Lillehammer, Norway. His grave was originally unmarked, but a memorial stone now marks its spot. During the week of Norsk Høstfest, held in Minot, N.D., groups visit the grave site and hold a commemorative service in memory of Sondre Norheim.

The movie, Frikaren på ski – The history of Sondre Norheim, the Father of Modern Ski Sport was produced by NRK in 1970. In 1984, Norheim was inducted into the Scandinavian-American Hall of Fame as the first class of inductees. A statue of Sondre Norheim by Norwegian sculptor Knut Skinnarland (1909–1993) was unveiled in 1987 in the Scandinavian Heritage Park, in Minot, North Dakota. During 1988, an identical statue was unveiled in Morgedal, Norway by King Olav V. During 1993, the Sondre Norheim Eternal Flame Monument was added to the Scandinavian Heritage Park. Lars Berge Haugan, a skier representing Morgedal, lit the flame.

== Ski jumping world record ==
Set on the first ever official ski jumping competition.

Date	Hill	Location	Metres	Feet
March 8, 1868	Hauglibakken	Brunkeberg, Norway	19.5	64
