= Bernina-Val-Roseg-Schanze =

Former ski jumping hill in Switzerland

- Location: Pontresina, Switzerland
- Coordinates: 46°28′51.7″N 9°53′24.4″E
- Operator: SC Bernina Pontresina
- Opened: 1925
- Closed: 1948

Size
- K–point: K75
- Hill record: 75 m (246 ft); Adolf Badrutt (12 January 1930)

Bernina-Val-Roseg-Schanze was a K75 ski jumping hill located in Val Roseg valley at Pontresina, Switzerland, opened in 1925.

== History ==
On 21 January 1928, Swiss Adolf Badrutt fell at 73.5 meters (241 ft) world record distance.

On 2 January 1930, Swiss Adolf Badrutt fell at 74.5 meters (244 ft) world record distance.

On 12 January 1930, Swiss Adolf Badrutt jumped 75 meters (246 ft) and set the only official world record on this hill.

== Ski jumping world records ==
No.	Date	Name	Country	Metres	Feet
F	21 January 1928	Adolf Badrutt	Switzerland	73.5	241
F	2 January 1930	Adolf Badrutt	Switzerland	74.5	244
#29	12 January 1930	Adolf Badrutt	Switzerland	75	246

Not recognized! Fall at world record distance.
