= Sigmund Ruud =

Norwegian ski jumper (1907–1994)

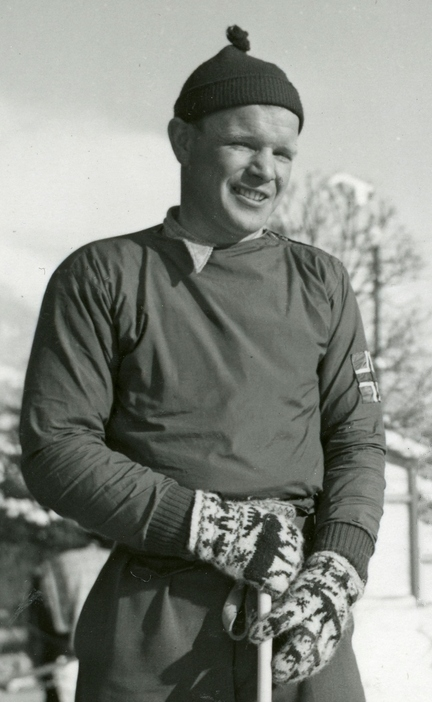

Personal information
- Nationality: Norway
- Born: 30 December 1907 Kongsberg, Norway
- Died: 7 April 1994 (aged 86) Oslo, Norway
- Height: 183 cm (6 ft 0 in)

Sport
- Sport: Skiing
- Club: Kongsberg IF

Achievements and titles
- Personal bests: 86 m (282 ft); Villars, Switzerland (19 January 1933)
Medal record
Men's ski jumping
Olympic Games
Silver medal – second place	1928 St. Moritz	Individual LH
World Championships
Gold medal – first place	1929 Zakopane	Individual LH
Silver medal – second place	1928 St. Moritz	Individual LH
Bronze medal – third place	1930 Oslo	Individual LH

Sigmund Ruud (30 December 1907 – 7 April 1994) was a Norwegian ski jumper. Together with his brothers Birger and Asbjørn, he dominated ski jumping in the 1920s and 1930s.

== Career ==
At the 1928 Winter Olympics in St. Moritz, Sigmund earned a silver medal. At the 1929 FIS Nordic World Ski Championships, he won the ski jumping competition while earning a bronze at the 1930 event. Sigmund also competed in the ski jumping competition at the Holmenkollen ski festival, which first began in 1933. He also competed at the 1932 Winter Olympics in the ski jumping event, but finished seventh due to appendicitis. Additionally, Sigmund wanted to compete in the first alpine skiing events at the 1936 Winter Olympics, though he did not start.

For his contributions in ski jumping, Sigmund earned the Holmenkollen medal in 1949, the last of the three Ruud brothers to do so. Sigmund was the only one of the three not to win the Holmenkollen ski jumping competition. Sigmund Ruud and fellow Norwegian ski jumper Jacob Tullin Thams are considered co-creators of the Kongsberger technique after World War I, a ski jumping technique that was the standard until it was superseded by the Daescher technique in the 1950s. Ruud also served as chairman of the FIS Ski Jumping Committee in 1946–1955 and 1959–1967. He owned and ran a sport shop in Oslo.

On 24 February 1931 he set his first official world record at 264 ft (80.5 metres). Later he set two more official world records at 84 m (276 ft) and 86 m (282 ft).

Ruud appeared in two films: The White Stadium (1928, as himself) and The Woman in the Advocate's Gown (1929).

== Ski jumping world records ==
Date	Hill	Location	Metres	Feet
24 February 1931	Bolgenschanze	Davos, Switzerland	80.5	264
March 1932	Bolgenschanze	Davos, Switzerland	82	269
19 January 1933	Tremplin de Bretaye	Villars, Switzerland	84	276
19 January 1933	Tremplin de Bretaye	Villars, Switzerland	86	282
25 March 1934	Bloudkova velikanka	Planica, Kingdom of Yugoslavia	95	312

Not recognized! He stood and tied Lymburne's WR distance, but hors concours, outside of competition.
Not recognized! Ground touch at world record distance.
