= Tremplin de Bretaye =

- Constructor: Adolf Badrutt
- Location: Villars-sur-Ollon, Switzerland
- Coordinates: 46°19′48″N 7°04′06.6″E
- Operator: SC Villars
- Opened: 1932

Size
- K–point: K80
- Hill record: 87 m (285 ft); Henri Ruchet (26 February 1933)

Tremplin de Bretaye was a K80 ski jumping hill located at Villars-sur-Ollon in Switzerland, opened in 1932. Owned by SC Villars, with three official world records set all in one week.

== History ==
On 10 January 1932, super modern hill, then one of the greatest in the world, was officially opened allowing jumps between 70 and 90 metres. It was constructed by Adolf Badrutt, swiss world record holder.

On 19 February 1933, Norwegian Sigmund Ruud set the first official world record on this hill at 84 metres (276 feet). Only two days later he improved the world record at 86 metres (282 feet).

On 26 February 1933, Henri Ruchet from Switzerland, set the third and the last official world record on this hill within one week, at 87 metres (285 feet).

== Ski jumping world records ==
| No. | Date | Name | Country | Metres | Feet |
|---|---|---|---|---|---|
| #32 | 19 February 1933 | Sigmund Ruud | Norway | 84 | 276 |
| #33 | 21 February 1933 | Sigmund Ruud | Norway | 86 | 282 |
| #34 | 26 February 1933 | Henri Ruchet | Switzerland | 87 | 285 |
