= Raukleiv =

Ski jumping hill in Norway

- Location: Asenvegen, Seljord Municipality, Norway
- Coordinates: 59°28′1.9″N 8°37′17.6″E
- Opened: 1886
- Renovated: 1975

Size
- Hill record: 25.5 m (84 ft) (Norway) Olaf Bergland (24 February 1886)

Raukleiv (or Raudkleiv) was a ski jumping hill located near Asenvegen in Seljord Municipality, Norway. It originally was in operation from 1886 until 1975. Following renewed investment, the site has once again renovated and reopened. It now features ski slopes, ski jumping hills, and a biathlon stadium.

== History ==
On 24 February 1886, the first Siljordsskirendet ski competition took place at Raukleiv. Norwegian soldier Johannes Nordgården jumped 27 metres (89 ft), but it was not recognised. Later that day, Olaf Bergland, also from Norway, landed at 25.5 metres (84 ft), setting a new official world record distance in ski jumping.

== Ski jumping world records ==
No.	Date	Name	Country	Metres	Feet
F	24 February 1886	Johannes Nordgården	Norway	27	89
#5	24 February 1886	Olaf Bergland	Norway	25.5	84

Not recognized. Fall at world record distance.
