= Eva Ganster =

Austrian ski jumper

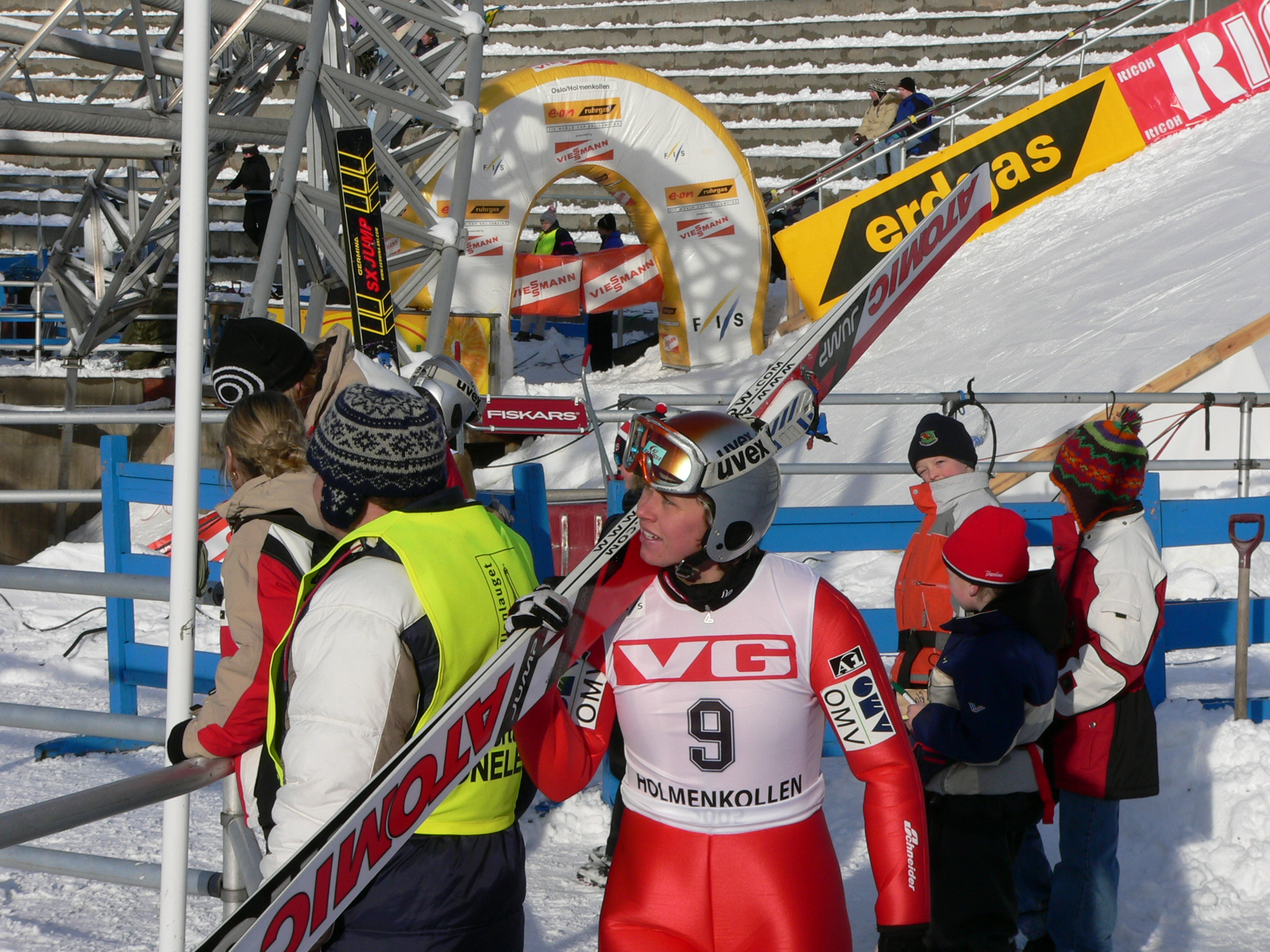
- Ganster in Oslo, 2005

Personal information
- Nationality: Austria
- Born: 30 March 1978 (age 48) Kitzbühel, Austria

Sport
- Sport: Skiing

Achievements and titles
- Personal bests: 167 m (548 ft); Kulm, 9 February 1997
- Updated on 20 May 2015

Eva Ganster (born 30 March 1978) is an Austrian former ski jumper. She has nine women's ski flying world records, set between 1994 and 1997.

== Early life ==
Ganster was born in Kitzbühel to parents Edgar and Dagmar Ganster. She has a younger brother, Axel. Eva began skiing at a very early age. At age ten she began ski jumping, competing alongside boys of the same age. During the 1990–91 Austrian National Championship season, she beat the boys in her age group to place first. However, she broke her foot and was unable to attend the World Youth Games.

== Career ==
In 1993, Ganster placed third at the Austrian National Championships in St. Agyd. It was here, in 1994, that she made her first world record jump of 113.5 metres (372 ft) in Lillehammer. Also in 1994, she became the first woman to "pre-jump" at the 1994 Winter Olympics in Lillehammer. Since then, women have competed under the auspices of the Women's Ski Jumping Working Group which was formed by the International Ski Federation (FIS) in 1994.

Ganster suffered setbacks in back-to-back seasons in 1995 and 1996, but with the advent of separate women's competitions she was able to begin to succeed again. On the ski flying hill in Kulm, she improved her world record by an unprecedented six times (an amount since unmatched by any woman or man) to a final figure of 167 metres (548 ft) on 9 February 1997. The women's world record would remain hers for another six years until Daniela Iraschko-Stolz landed a jump of 188 metres (617 ft) on 29 January 2003.

In 1998, Ganster won the National Championships and she was placed second in the World Junior Championships. The International Ski Federation formally approved Ladies Grand Prix competitions the following year. In 2000 and 2001, Ganster placed second at the National Championships; she won the event in 2002.

From 2003 to 2005, Ganster competed regularly in FIS events. In 2004, she won one event in Pöhla and medalled at several others. Her final competitive ski jump at international level was in Oslo on 12 March 2005, where she placed eighth. She never formally represented her country in Olympic ski jumping, which did not become an official Olympic sport for women until 2014, when Carina Vogt won the first Gold medal.

Records
Preceded by Merete Kristiansen; 111 m (364 ft)	World's longest female ski jump 167 m (548 ft); 9 February 1997 – 29 January 2003	Succeeded by Daniela Iraschko-Stolz; 188 m (617 ft)
