= Hlíðarfjall =

Mountain in Iceland

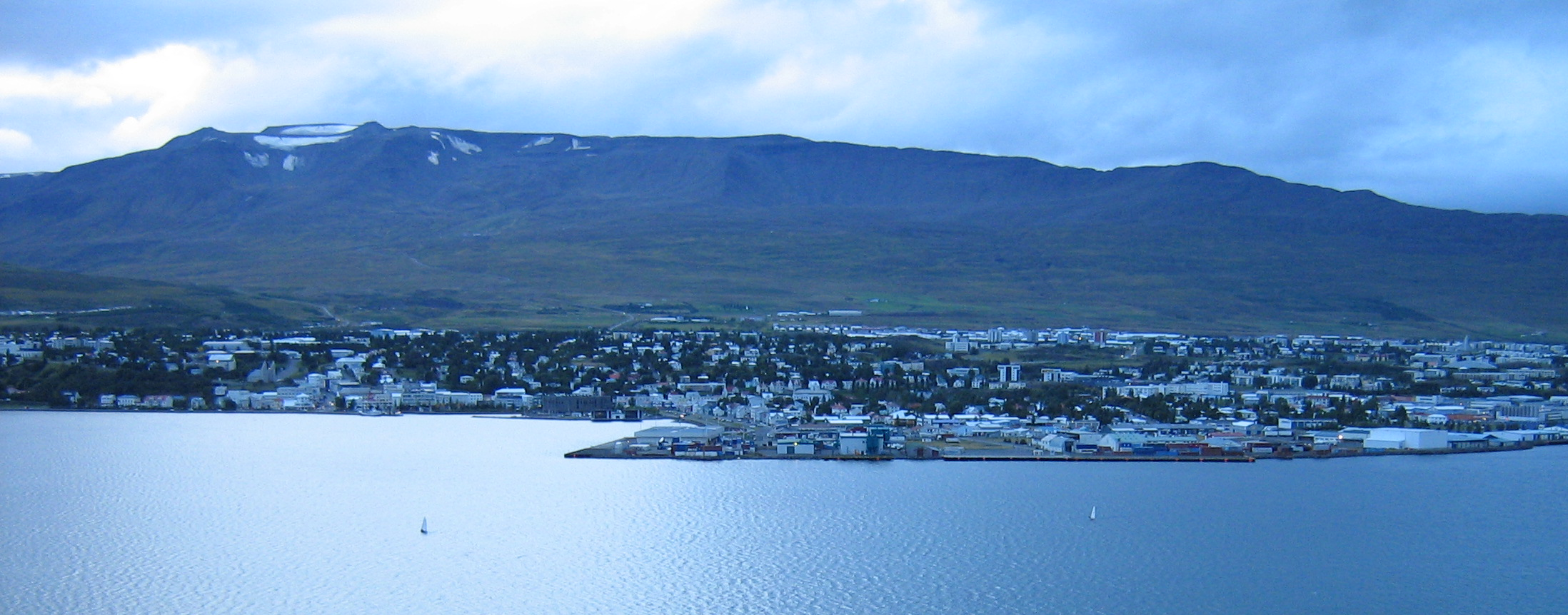
- Akureyri with Hlíðarfjall in the background.

- Location in Iceland
- Location: Akureyri, Eyjafjöður, Iceland.
- Nearest city: Akureyri - 5.7 km
- Coordinates: 65°38′55″N 18°15′57″W
- Status: Operating
- Opened: 1967
- Owner: Municipality of Akureyri
- Vertical: continuous 514m
- Top elevation: 1,014 m (3,327 ft)
- Base elevation: 500 m (1,600 ft)
- Trails: 24
- Longest run: 2.3 km (1.4 mi)
- Lift system: 2 fixed-grip quad chairlifts 1 T-bar; 3 Platter lifts 1 magic carpet 1 rope tow
- Lift capacity: 8,477 / hr
- Terrain parks: Yes
- Snowmaking: Yes
- Night skiing: Yes
- Website: hlidarfjall.is

Hlíðarfjall (Icelandic pronunciation: [ˈl̥iːðarˌfjatl̥]) is a mountain and ski resort located around 6 km west of the Icelandic town Akureyri in Eyjafjörður. The mountain itself has an elevation of 1,200m, It is the second largest ski resort in Iceland and reaches a top elevation of 1,014m. The base of the resort is at an elevation of 500m.

== Ski resort ==
The Hlíðarfjall mountain hosts northern Iceland's largest ski area, and Iceland's highest elevation ski lift. The resort operates 8 ski lifts, 2 of which are quad chairlifts. The top elevation reachable by ski lift is 1,014m. There are 24 ski runs, offering a total of 14.9km of pistes with varying difficulty.

At the base, called Skíðastaðir, hosts the ticket office, ski/snowboard rental, parking and a café, at 500m. Mid-mountain, there is a hut, called Strýtan, housing a café and toilet facilities. A terrain park is located just below Strýtan. To the north of the parking area there is a cross-country skiing trail. Ski passes use the SKIDATA system. Trails are groomed daily during the season. As daylight is limited as a result of the location's latitude, night skiing is offered on many slopes, which are lit up by floodlights. The lifts are also operated during the summertime for limited hours, offering mountain biking trails.

A total of 8 ski lifts are in use at Hlíðarfjall, all of which are manufactured by Doppelmayr:

- Fjarkinn - fixed-grip quad charilift
- Fjallkonan - fixed-grip quad chairlift (highest elevation of 1,014m)
- Strompur - T-bar
- Hjallabraut - platter lift
- Skálabraut - platter lift
- Hólabraut - platter lift
- Auður - rope tow
- Töfrateppi - magic carpet

The Fjallkonan chairlift is the highest lift on the mountain (and Iceland), reaching an elevation of 1014m. It is often closed due to windy conditions, avalanche risk and difficulties in staffing enough lift operators; in its first 2 years of operation it had only been open for a third of the time. However the Strompur T-bar reaches 980m height, just below the Fjallkonan endpoint.

The resort is located around 6 km from Akureyri city centre and is accessible via a 10 minute drive up the mountain. Parking is available by the base of the resort, by Skíðastaðir.

== History ==
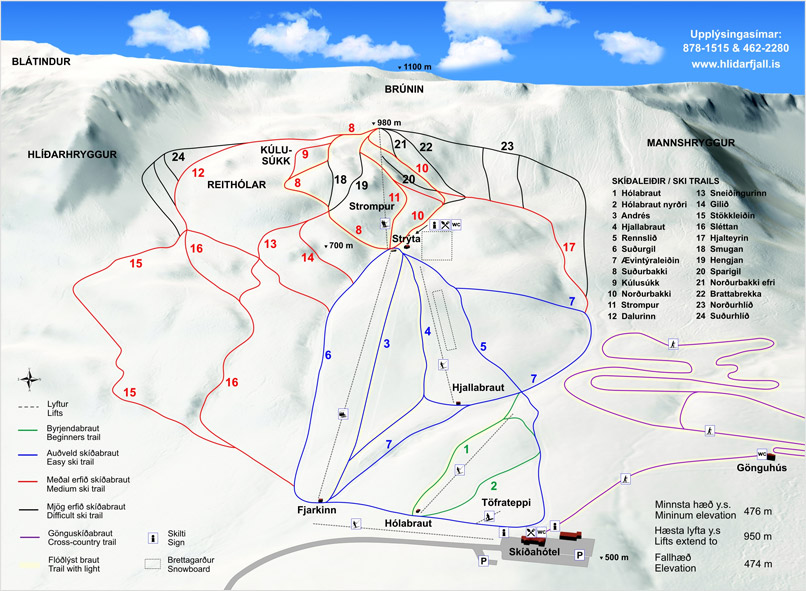
Former trail map of the Hlíðarfjall resort, missing the new addition of the Fjallkonan chairlift.

Hlíðarfjall is generally considered to be named after Lögmannshlíð, a (formerly important) homestead and church site on the slopes of the mountain (the word hlíð having the meaning "slope").

The development of the Hlíðarfjall mountain begain in 1955 when the hotel located at the current base of the resort began construction, reusing timber from the former Akureyri Hospital building. The hotel, called Skíðastaðir or Skíðahótelið (transliterated meaning Ski Place or Ski Hotel), began operations in 1962. The building remains the hub and base for the ski resort, but stopped accommodating guests in 1983.

In 1967, a chairlift was installed on the mountain, on the same course as the Fjarkinn lift is today. In 1974, the Stropmur platter lift was opened increasing the maximum elevation to around 900m. The mid-mountain hut housing a café and rest facilities was constructed in 1999, as well as expanded parking facilities. In 2001, the chairlift was renewed with a fixed-grip quad, now named Fjarkinn.

In 2022, a second quad chairlift was opened, Fjallkonan, and increased the maximum elevation to 1014m. The construction of the Fjallkonan lift was delayed by over 3 years. It follows almost the same path as the Strompur T-bar.

In April 2024, a purpose-built ski jumping hill was constructed at Hlíðarfjall by Red Bull for promotional purposes for a world-record attempt at the longest ski jump. Ski jumper Ryōyū Kobayashi made four successful attempts to break the world record. The temporary hill, constructed using snow groomers, was located higher than the elevation of the highest lift to the north of the regular trails. This location was chosen due to the hill's characteristics and ideal natural slope angle. On the 23 April Kobayashi jumped 256 m (840 ft). The following day he improved it to 259 m (850 ft), 282 m (925 ft), and finally 291 m (955 ft). His longest jump of 291m is an unofficial world record, as it is not officially recognised by the FIS as a standard ski jump.
