= Bolgenschanze (1928, new hill) =

Ski jumping hill in Davos, Switzerland

New Bolgenschanze
- Location: Davos, Switzerland
- Coordinates: 46°47′21.5″N 09°49′33.8″E
- Operator: Ski Club Davos
- Opened: 1928
- Closed: 1964

Size
- K–point: K74
- Hill record: 81 m (266 ft); Sigmund Ruud (24 February 1931)

New Bolgenschanze is an abandoned K74 ski jumping hill at Davos, Switzerland from 1928. It was located on the same road as old Bolgenschanze, approximately 500 meters away.

== History ==
In December 1928 the hill, planned by Grünenfelder and Straumann, was completed. Local Swiss jumper E. Maurer from Davos made an inaugural test jump and set first but unofficial hill record at 57 meters (197 ft).

In 1930, Davos hosted Academic World Winter Games, when Fritz Kaufmann jumped 73 meters during intern training of Swiss national team.

On 24 February 1931, Sigmund Ruud set the only official world record on this hill at 81 metres (266 ft). Local Fritz Kaufmann won the international competition.

In March 1932, Sigmund Ruud jumped 82 meters (269 ft) in hours concours (unofficially after competition) tied the Robert Lymburne's WR distance short after (he set it on 12 March), but both of them were never officially recognized.

With its modern profile, the Bolgenschanze attracted significant international attention at the time and was highly regarded by leading ski jumpers. As a result, Davos became a major center for ski jumping in Switzerland.

== Hill and world records ==
No.	Date	Name	Country	Metres	Feet
HT	26 December 1928	E. Mauerer	Switzerland	57	187
HR	15 January 1929	Paavo Nuotio	Finland	60	197
HR	15 January 1929	Fritz Kaufmann	Switzerland	61	200
TR	16 January 1930	Fritz Kaufmann	Switzerland	73.5	241
HR	17 January 1931	Fritz Kaufmann	Switzerland	70	230
HR	4 January 1931	Bruno Trojani	Switzerland	72	236
#31	24 February 1931	Sigmund Ruud	Norway	81	266
UN	+12 March 1932	Sigmund Ruud	Norway	82	269

Official world record!
Not recognized! Hill record set on hill test.
Not recognized! Hill record set on Swiss internal training.
Not recognized! Tied Lymburne's WR distance, set hors concours (out of ompetition).
