= Ecker Hill Ski Jump =

- U.S. National Register of Historic Places
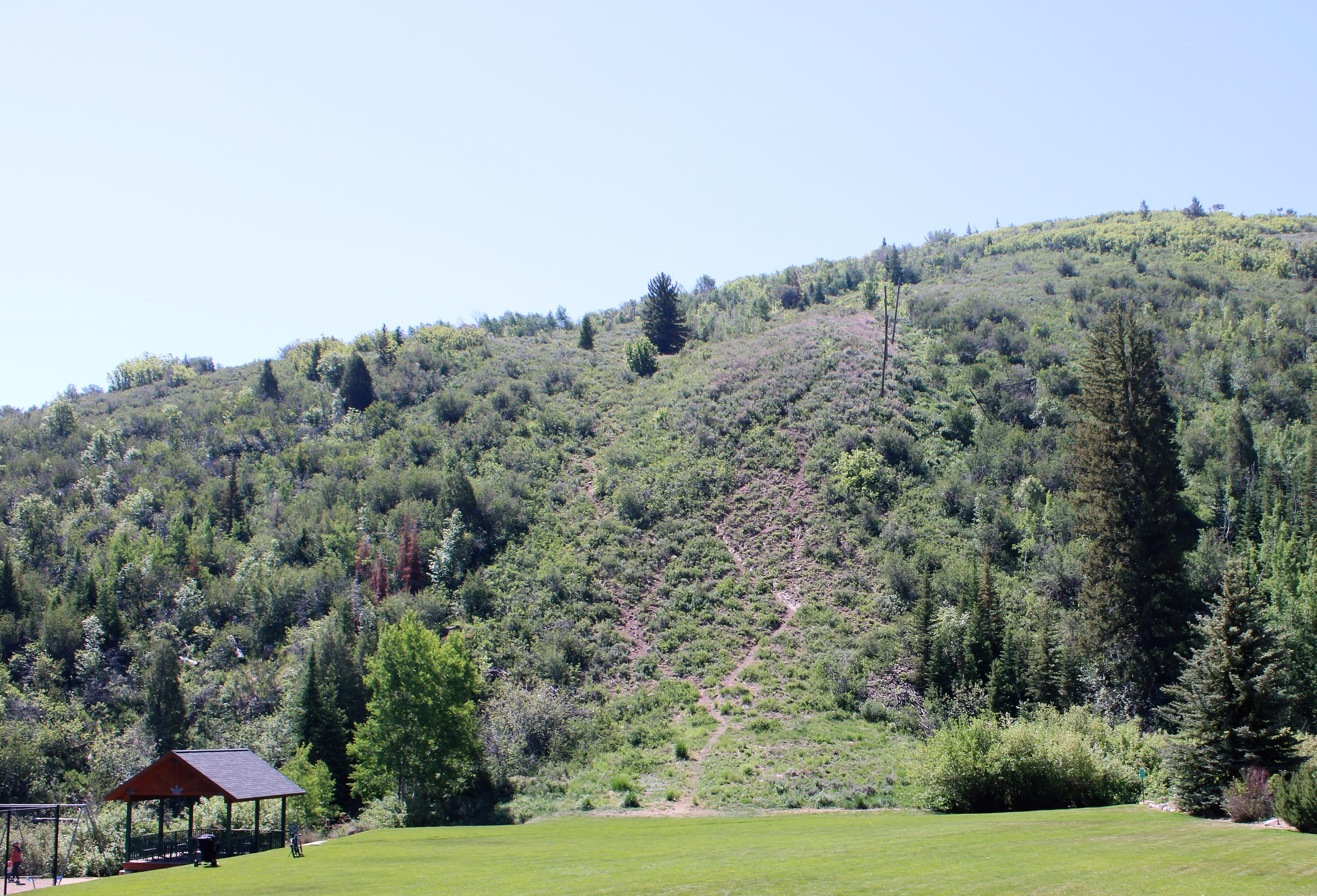

- Location within Utah Location within the United States
- Nearest city: Snyderville, Utah
- Coordinates: 40°44′40.4″N 111°34′34.8″W
- Area: 7.3 acres (3.0 ha)
- Built: 1928
- NRHP reference No.: 86001251
- Added to NRHP: June 4, 1986

The Ecker Hill Ski Jump, in Summit County, Utah near Snyderville, Utah, was built in 1928. It was listed on the National Register of Historic Places in 1986.

According to its National Register nomination in 1986, "The Ecker Hill Ski Jump consists of an approximately 300 foot hillside that was first groomed for jumping in 1928, a dilapidated wooden takeoff ramp, extremely deteriorated remnants of a judging or observation stand and of a wooden stairway that ascends the hill, a frame shed at the base of the hill (c. 1950?), and a small wooden judging stand that was probably built in the 1950s or later. Despite the deteriorated condition of those structures, the site retains its integrity because its principal feature, the hill itself, is still discernible as a ski jumping site."

Numerous photos of ski jump competitions survive.

It is located off Interstate 80.

There is a large historic plaque at a park on Pinebrook Road, below the jump's site, which presumably commemorates the jump. It appears the hillside going up is open to hiking up.

For more information about Ecker Hill, and the History of Skiing in Utah you can visit the Alf Engen Ski Museum located about 2.5 miles away.
