= Odnes =

Village in Søndre Land, Norway

- Village
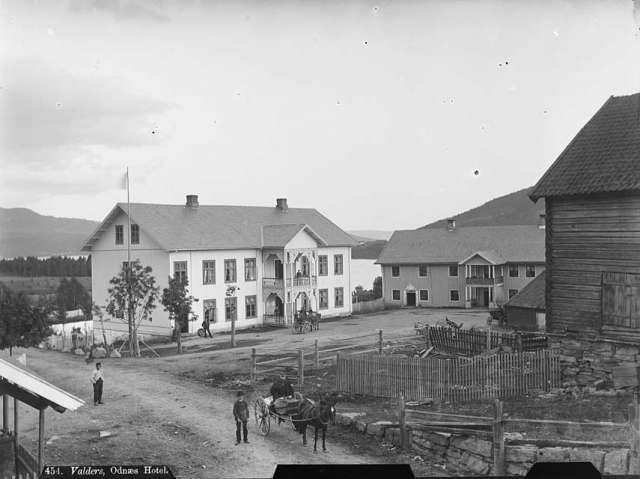
- View of the Odnes Hotel, photographed by Axel Lindahl circa 1880–1890
- Interactive map of Odnes
- Location within Innlandet Location within Norway
- Coordinates: 60.8025°N 10.17975°E
- Country: Norway
- Region: Eastern Norway
- County: Innlandet
- District: Land
- Municipality: Søndre Land Municipality
- Elevation: 167 m (548 ft)
- Time zone: UTC+01:00 (CET)
  - Summer (DST): UTC+02:00 (CEST)
- Post Code: 2879 Odnes

Odnes is a village in Søndre Land Municipality in Innlandet county, Norway. The village is located on the north side of the Randsfjorden along County Road 33 and it is named after the nearby Odnes farm. The village lies about 8 kilometres (5.0 mi) to the southeast of the village of Dokka and about 6.5 kilometres (4.0 mi) to the northwest of the village of Fluberg.

== Skiing ==
Odnes is known for the large Odnes ski jump (Norwegian: Odnesbakken or Flubergbakken), which was dismantled in 2008 after much discussion. Birger Ruud set the world record in ski jumping here in 1931, jumping 76.5 metres (251 ft), and Johanna Kolstad set the women's world record at 46.5 metres (153 ft) the same year. Merete Kristiansen set the world record at 111 metres (364 ft) in 1989.
