= Fritz Kaufmann =

Swiss ski jumper

Medal record

Men's ski jumping

Representing Switzerland

World Championships
| Silver medal – second place | 1931 Oberhof | Individual large hill |

Fritz Kaufmann (15 April 1905 – 22 January 1941) was a Swiss ski jumper and Nordic combined skier who competed in the 1930s. He was born in Grindelwald.

Kaufmann won a silver medal in the individual large hill at the 1931 FIS Nordic World Ski Championships in Oberhof. At the 1932 Winter Olympics he finished sixth in the ski jumping competition and 23rd in the Nordic combined event.
