= Harald Smith =

Norwegian Nordic combined skier

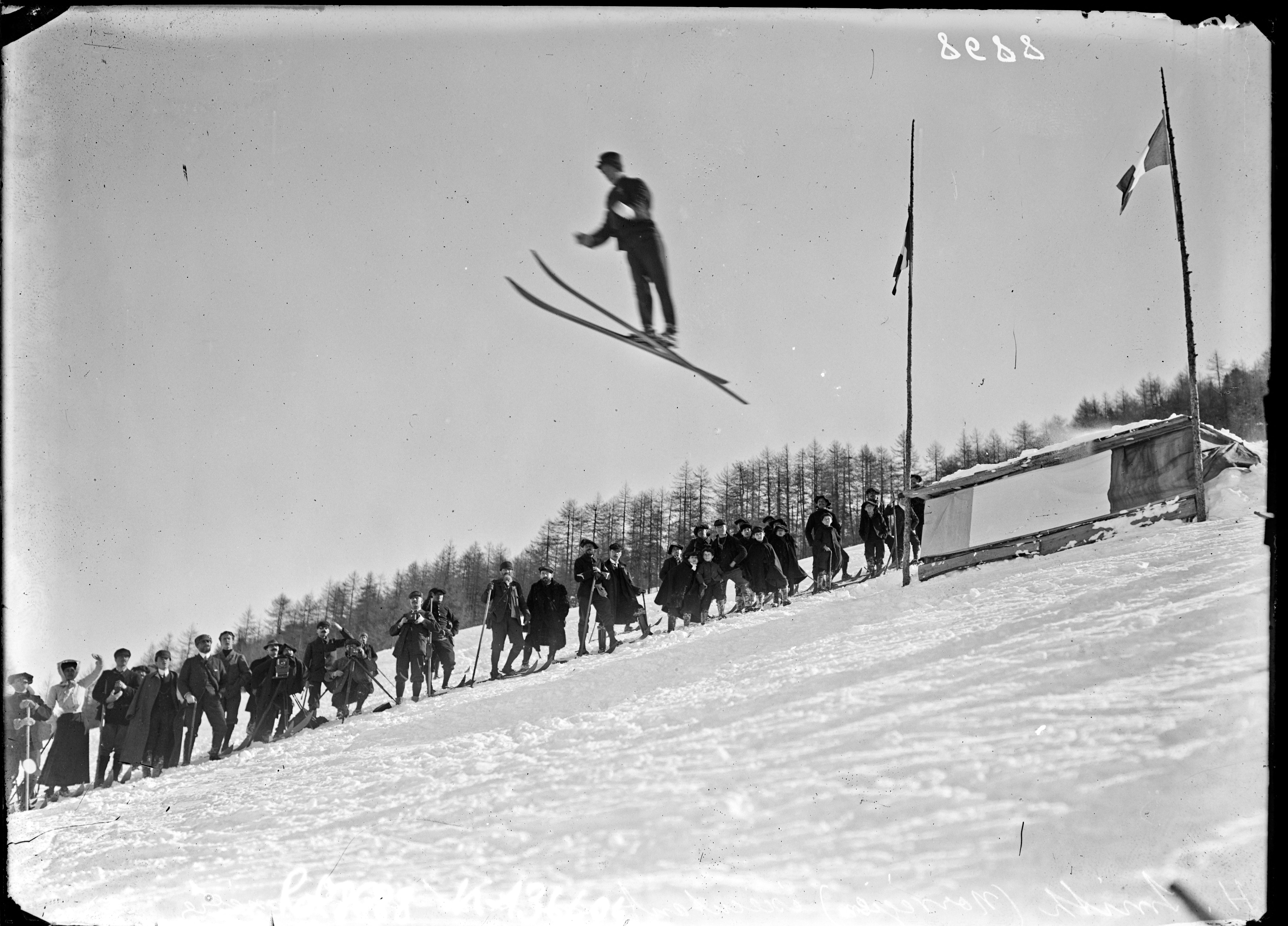
- H. Smith at Montgenèvre in 1907

Personal information
- Nationality: Norway
- Born: 29 June 1879 Østre Aker, Oslo, Norway
- Died: May 1977 (aged 97) Bad Ragaz, Switzerland

Sport
- Sport: Skiing

Achievements and titles
- Personal bests: 45 m (148 ft); Davos, Switzerland (28 February 1909)

Harald Smith (29 June 1879 – May 1977) was a Norwegian Nordic skier who won the Holmenkollen medal in 1904.

== Career ==
Smith was born in Østre Aker, a borough of the city of Oslo. After 1905 he moved to Sauze d'Oulx, Italy, and competed in the Italian Alps. In 1908, together with the Italian ski jumper Paolo Kind, Smith designed the first ski jumping hill of Italy in Bardonecchia, which was finished in 1909, and where he held a record of 43 metres. The hill was named Trampolino Campo Smith in honor of his success. He also kept the record of 45 metres on the Bolgenschanze in Davos (1909).

Smith died in Bad Ragaz. His brother Trygve was also a notable ski jumper of his time.

== Ski jumping world records ==
Date	Hill	Location	Metres	Feet
1909	Trampolino Campo Smith	Bardonecchia, Kingdom of Italy	43	141
28 February 1909	Bolgenschanze	Davos, Switzerland	45	148
