= Kløvsteinbakken =

Ski jumping large hill in Meldal, Norway

Coordinates: 63.0433°N 9.6855°E

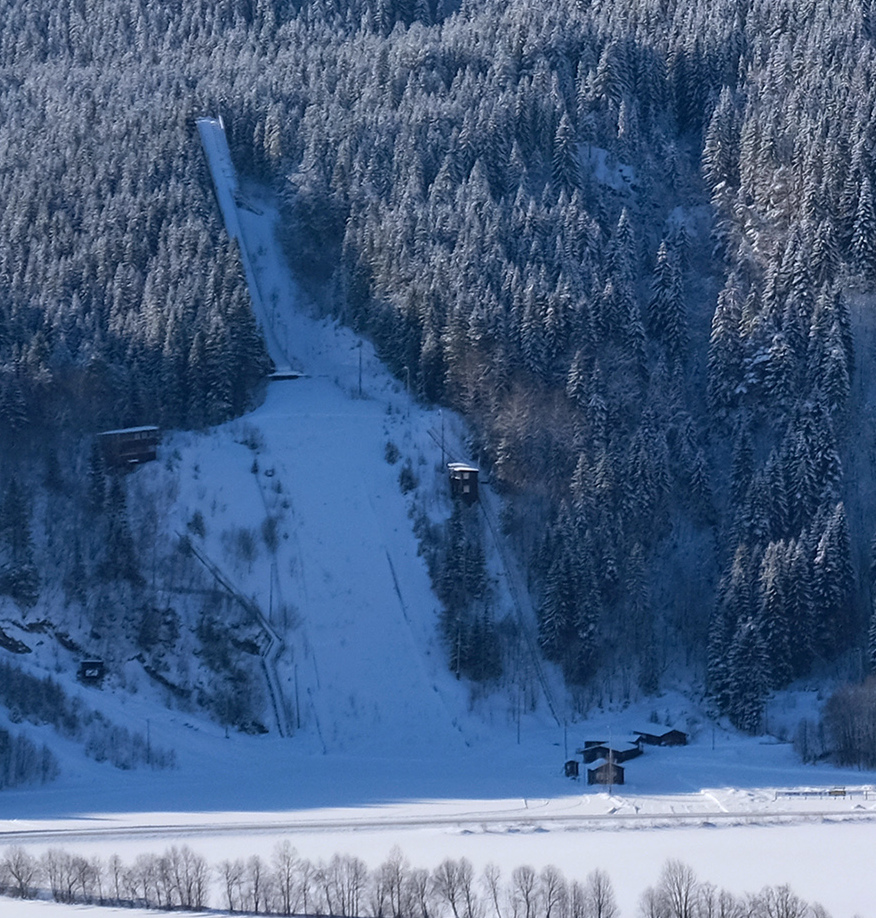
- Location: Meldal; Norway
- Opened: 1946
- Renovated: 1965, 1981, 1997, 2002

Size
- K–point: K-105
- Hill size: HS 117
- Hill record: 120.5 m (395 ft) (Norway) Jan Christian Bjørn (21 March 2009)

Kløvsteinbakken is a ski jumping large hill just outside the village of Meldal in Orkland Municipality, Trøndelag county, Norway.

== History ==
It was built in 1946-1947 and owned by Meldal IL, Orklahopp. First official competition was held on 7 February 1948. It hosted one FIS Ski jumping World Cup event in 1988. Jan Christian Bjørn holds the hill record.

== World Cup ==
=== Men ===
Date	Size	Winner	Second	Third
18 Mar 1988	K-105	(Norway) Erik Johnsen	(Austria) Oliver Strohmaier	(Czech Republic) Jiří Malec
