= Bolgenschanze (1909, old hill) =

Ski jumping hill in Davos, Switzerland

Old Bolgenschanze
- Location: Davos, Switzerland
- Coordinates: 46°47′08.2″N 09°49′26.1″E
- Operator: Ski Club Davos
- Opened: 1909
- Closed: 1950s (early)

Size
- K–point: K53
- Hill record: 48 m (157 ft); Thorleif Knudsen (2 March 1913)

Old Bolgenschanze is an abandoned K53 ski jumping hill at Davos, Switzerland from 1909. It was located on the same road as new Bolgenschanze, only about 500 meters away.

== History ==
=== 1909: Opening with world record ===
On 28 February 1909, hill officially opened with antemeridian competition and 1200 spectators. Norway with Harald Smith who set the only hill official world record at 45 meters (148 ft), won the opening competition in front of his brother Trygve Smith, who fell at 46 meters (151 ft) invalid world record distance and the third was their teammate Trygve Myklegaard. In the afternoon jump were shorter due to a weather. Individual jumps shorter than 40 meters and double jumps came up to 36 meters.

On 11 February 1913, Emil Knudsen from Norway fell at 49 meters (161 ft) world record distance, which off course didn't count. Knudsen set the hill record three weeks later at 48 meters.

=== 1950s: Failed hill revival attempts ===
In late 1950s several attempts to establish a ski jump tournament with St. Moritz and Arosa failed unfortunately. When the ski club could not realize the necessary reconstruction of the ski jump due to financial reasons and the cure organisation didn't no longer financially support operation and maintenance, too, the end of the most traditional ski jumping hill of Middle Europe had come. Today the slope is still used for alpine skiing.

== Ski jumping world records ==
No.	Date	Name	Country	Metres	Feet
#18	28 February 1909	Harald Smith	Norway	45	148
F	28 February 1909	Trygve Smith	Norway	46	151
F	11 February 1913	Thorleif Knudsen	Norway	49	161
HR	2 March 1913	Thorleif Knudsen	Norway	48	157

Not recognized! Crash at WR.
Official hill record.
