= Morgedal =

Village in Kviteseid Municipality, Norway

- Village
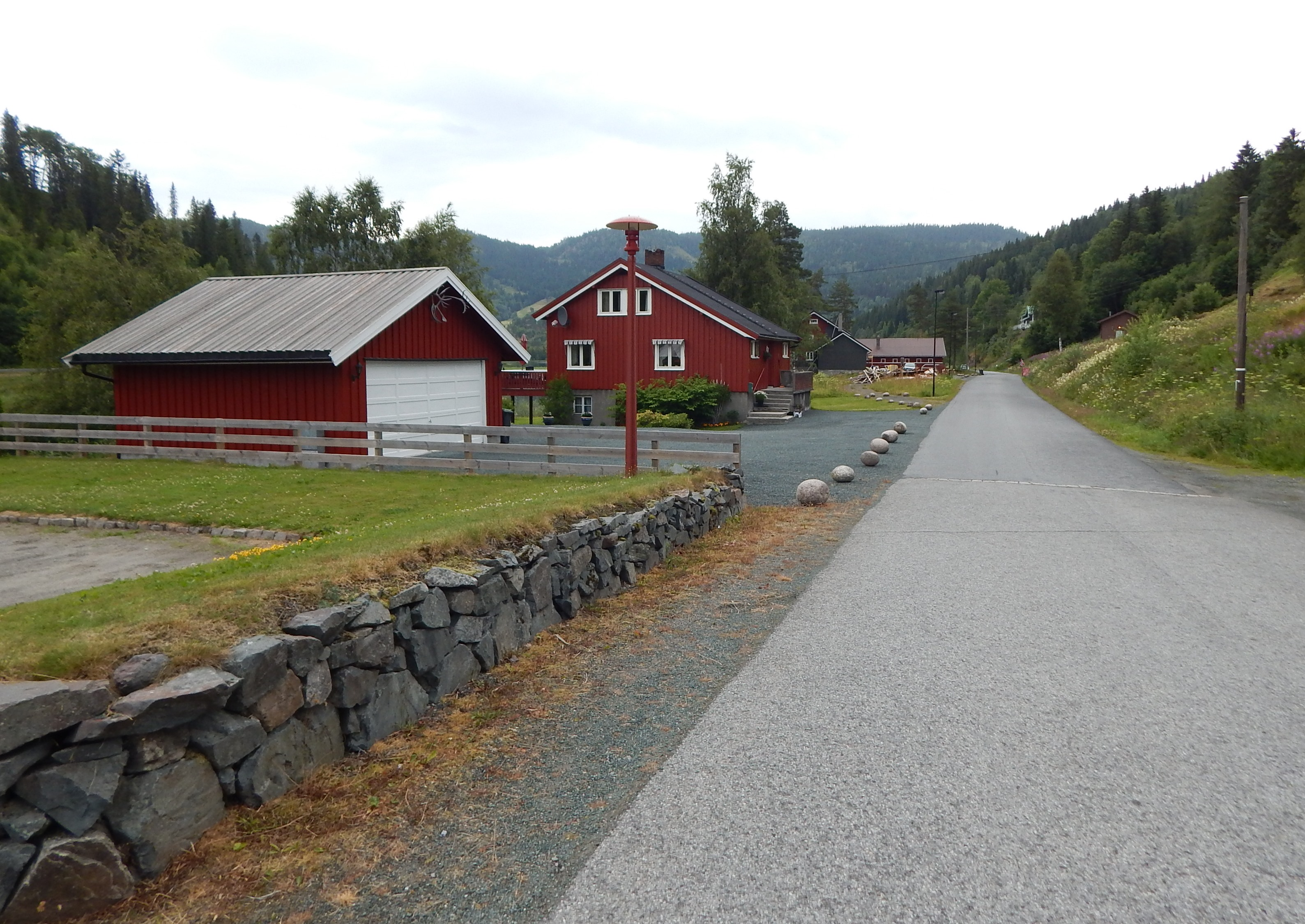
- View of the village
- Interactive map of Morgedal
- Coordinates: 59.47727°N 8.41858°E
- Country: Norway
- Region: Eastern Norway
- County: Telemark
- District: Vest-Telemark
- Municipality: Kviteseid Municipality
- Elevation: 426 m (1,398 ft)
- Time zone: UTC+01:00 (CET)
  - Summer (DST): UTC+02:00 (CEST)
- Post Code: 3848 Morgedal

Morgedal is a village in Kviteseid Municipality in Telemark county, Norway. The village is located in the mountains along the European route E134 highway, about 6 kilometres (3.7 mi) to the northwest of the village of Brunkeberg and about 9 kilometres (5.6 mi) to the northwest of the village of Kviteseid.

== Skiing ==
The village is notable because it is considered to be the birthplace of the sport of downhill skiing. Morgedal was home to Sondre Norheim who is often called the father of modern skiing. It was also home to Torjus Hemmestveit and Mikkjel Hemmestveit, two brothers who created the world's first skiing school in Christiania, Norway in 1881 before emigrating to the United States in the late 19th century.

Olav Bjaaland, another skier from Morgedal, journeyed to the South Pole as a member of Amundsen's South Pole expedition. Bjaaland skied at the front of the expedition party so that the sled dogs had something to run after.

The Olympic Flames for the 1952 Winter Olympics in Oslo and the 1960 Winter Olympics in Squaw Valley, and the flame used in the national torch relay for the 1994 Winter Olympics in Lillehammer (which was later used as the flame for the 1994 Winter Paralympics), were all lit at the Øvrebø farm in Morgedal, the birthplace of Sondre Norheim.
