= Geithus =

Village in Modum Municipality, Norway

Coordinates: 59°57′N 9°59′E

Geithus is a village in Modum municipality of Buskerud, Norway. It is situated between the villages of Åmot and Vikersund.

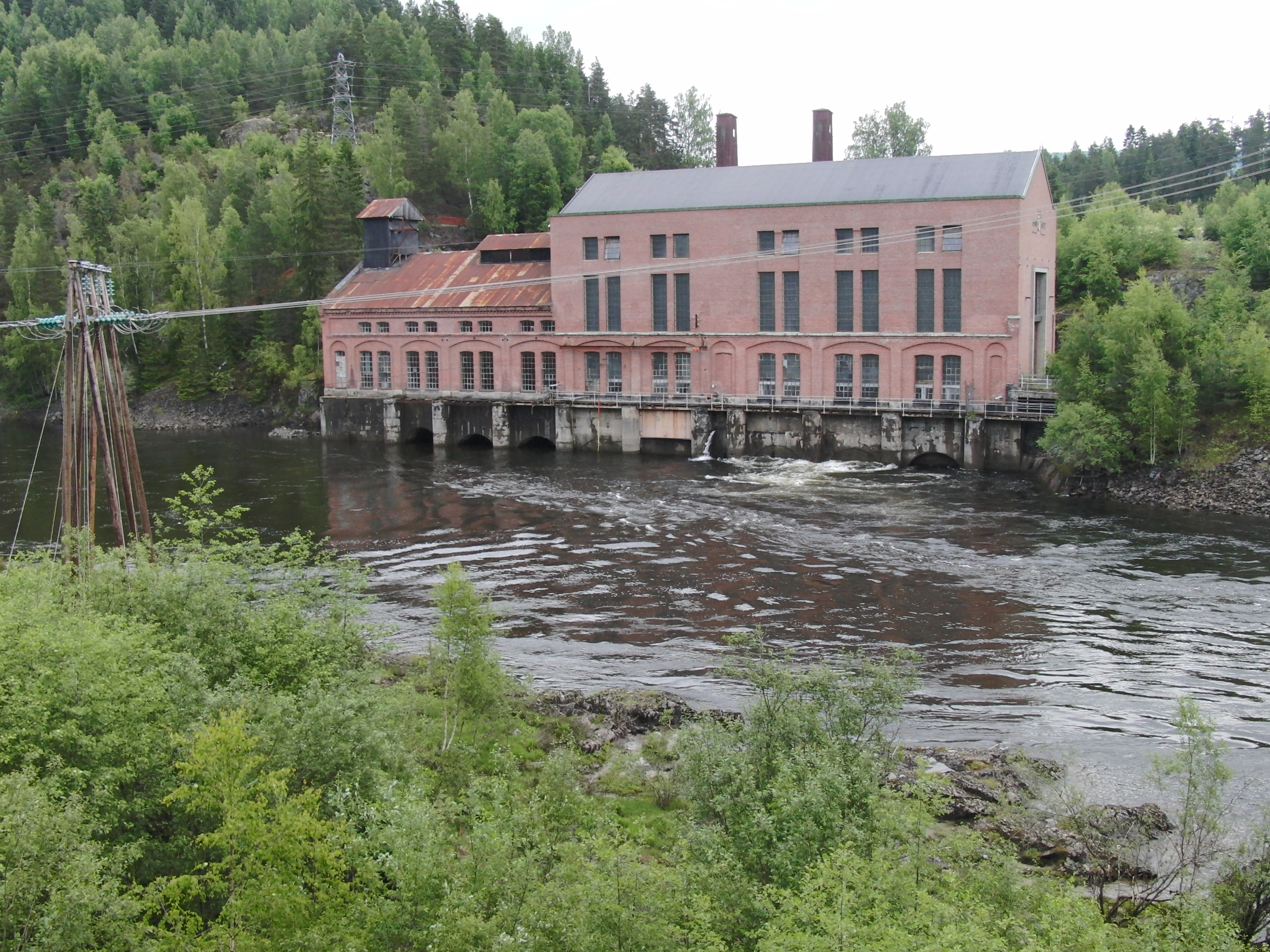
Gravfoss 1 kraftverk.

Geithus is located where the southwestern arm of Tyrifjorden ends and drains into Drammenselva. Geithusbrua is a cable bridge, that spans the junction where Tyrifjorden turns into Drammenselva. There are two hydroelectric powerplants; Geithusfoss kraftverk and Gravfoss kraftverk. The area around Geithus in forested. Originally, there was an active pulp and paper industry in Geithus principally through the operation of Katfos Fabrikker. Production of paper, pulp and cellulose started in 1898. The operating was sold to Norske Skog Follum in 1970 and production stopped in 1983.

There is a forty-minute trip to Drammen, and a little over an hour to Oslo. Until 2004, you could get to Geithus by train. Geithus rail station (Geithus stasjon) was built in 1875 as part of the Randsfjorden Line. Today it is closed, even though locals have demanded to get their station back.
