= Planica 1948 =

Skiing Competition in Yugoslavia in 1948

Coordinates: 46°28′43″N 13°43′16″E

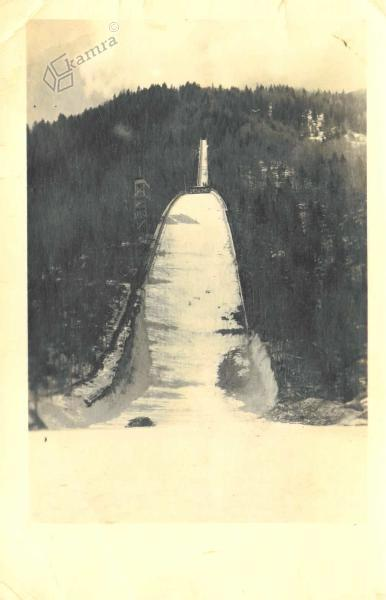
- Host city: Planica, FPR Yugoslavia
- Sport: Ski flying
- Events: International Ski Flying Week
- Main venue: Bloudkova velikanka K120

Planica 1948 was an International ski flying week competition held from 14—17 March 1948 in Planica, PR Slovenia, FPR Yugoslavia. Over 20,000 people has gathered in total. The best jump counted as final result.

== Schedule ==
Date	Event	Rounds	Longest jump of the day	Visitors
11 March 1948	Training	—	canceled; high temperatures, melted snow	—
12 March 1948	Training	—	canceled; snow was still not prepared	—
13 March 1948	Training	2; 2	88 metres (289 ft) by Charles Blum (morning); 111 metres (364 ft) by Charles Blum (afternoon)	N/A
14 March 1948	Competition: Day 1	2 ————— 1	120 metres (394 ft) by Janez Polda (morning, crash); 113 metres (371 ft) by Charles Blum (morning) ————————————————————————— 121 metres (397 ft) by Fritz Tschannen (afternoon, crash); 103 metres (338 ft) by Charles (afternoon)	10,000
15 March 1948	Competition: Day 2	3; 2	109 metres (358 ft) by Fritz Tschannen (morning); 120 metres (394 ft) by Fritz Tschannen (afternoon)	N/A
16 March 1948	Competition: Day 3	3 —	104 metres (341 ft) by Rudi Finžgar (morning) canceled; temperatures, melting snow (afternoon)	3,000
17 March 1948	Competition: Day 4	2	100 metres (328 ft) by Franc Pribošek	N/A

== Competition ==
On 11 March 1948, the first day of training jumps at the international ski flying week was on schedule. But it was canceled due to high temperatures and sun which was melting the snow.

On 12 March 1948, the second day the international ski flying week on schedule also did not allow any jumps. Again due to weather conditions, temperatures got little cooler but snow under was still not hard enough.

On 13 March 1948, the first and only training was held at last after weather problems two days in a row. A couple of thousands people has gathered, who have seen morning and afternoon event with two rounds. Fritz Tschannen was the longest at 104 metres.

On 14 March 1948, opening with the first day of competition was on schedule, in the morning event with two rounds and afternoon event only with one jump due to icy inrun track. Janez Polda touched the ground at 120 metres world record distance in the morning event and another world record distance was beat at the afternoon event when Swiss jumper Charles Blum crashed at 121 metres. Total of 10,000 people has gathered that day.

On 15 March 1948, the second day of competition was on schedule with the morning and afternoon event, both times with three rounds. Fritz Tschannen set the world record at 120 metres in his last attempt of day at afternoon event.

On 16 March 1948, the third day of competition was on schedule in the morning event with three rounds, afternoon was canceled due to high temperatures and melting snow. Rudi Finžgar was the longest with 104 metres in front of 3,000 people.

On 17 March 1948, the last day of international ski flying week competition was on schedule, but with two rounds only as due to weather conditions event was ended right after. Fritz Tschannen won the four-day competition with 120 m in the battle for the best jump.

=== Training ===
13 March 1948 — 9:30 AM — Four rounds — chronological order

Bib	Name	Country	Round 1	Round 2
1	Lojze Razinger	Yugoslavia	62 m	67 m
2	Jože Langus	Yugoslavia	59 m	62 m
3	Ivo Javornik	Yugoslavia	72 m	73 m
4	Janez Rožič	Yugoslavia	64 m	62 m
5	Jože Zalokar	Yugoslavia	66 m	67 m
6	Bine Rogelj	Yugoslavia	68 m	57 m
7	Franc Pribošek	Yugoslavia	65 m	69 m
8	Ivo Razboršek	Yugoslavia	59 m	52 m
9	Janez Polda	Yugoslavia	80 m	92 m
10	Janko Mežik	Yugoslavia	73 m	84 m
11	Arsène Lucchini	France	74 m	72 m
12	Régis Charlet	France	69 m	67 m
13	Jean Mounier	France	66 m	71 m
14	Rudi Finžgar	Yugoslavia	59 m	80 m
15	Charles Blum	Switzerland	69 m	88 m
16	Fritz Tschannen	Switzerland	70 m	84 m
17	Niklaus Stump	Switzerland	69 m	80 m
18	Hans Zurbriggen	Switzerland	71 m	85 m
Afternoon jumps
1	Franc Pribošek	Yugoslavia	92 m	—
2	Lojze Razinger	Yugoslavia	78 m	84 m
3	Jože Langus	Yugoslavia	75 m	72 m
4	Ivo Razboršek	Yugoslavia	74 m	77 m
5	Bine Rogelj	Yugoslavia	70 m	70 m
6	Janko Mežik	Yugoslavia	92 m	—
7	Rudi Finžgar	Yugoslavia	90 m	97 m
9	Janez Polda	Yugoslavia	103 m	—
10	Ivo Javornik	Yugoslavia	85 m	83 m
11	Jože Zalokar	Yugoslavia	77 m	82 m
12	Charles Blum	Switzerland	88 m	111 m
13	Niklaus Stump	Switzerland	79 m	94 m
14	Hans Zurbriggen	Switzerland	89 m	100 m
15	Fritz Tschannen	Switzerland	98 m	104 m
16	Arsène Lucchini	France	84 m	86 m
17	Jean Mounier	France	90 m	85 m
18	Régis Charlet	France	91 m	88 m

=== Competition: Day 1 ===
14 March 1948 — 10:00 AM — Three rounds — chronological order

Bib	Name	Country	Round 1	Round 2
1	Charles Blum	Switzerland	102 m	113 m
2	Fritz Tschannen	Switzerland	106 m	100 m
3	Niklaus Stump	Switzerland	99 m	109 m
4	Hans Zurbriggen	Switzerland	100 m	100 m
5	Rudi Finžgar	Yugoslavia	97 m	97 m
6	Ivo Javornik	Yugoslavia	93 m	94 m
7	Arsène Lucchini	France	105 m	107 m
8	Jean Mounier	France	97 m	102 m
9	Régis Charlet	France	107 m	105 m
10	Janez Polda	Yugoslavia	120 m	109 m
11	Janko Mežik	Yugoslavia	100 m	106 m
12	Lojze Razinger	Yugoslavia	82 m	82 m
13	Jože Langus	Yugoslavia	79 m	84 m
14	Janez Rožič	Yugoslavia	82 m	86 m
15	Ivo Razboršek	Yugoslavia	83 m	80 m
16	Jože Zalokar	Yugoslavia	102 m	100 m
17	Bine Rogelj	Yugoslavia	84 m	85 m
18	Franc Pribošek	Yugoslavia	96 m	100 m
Afternoon jumps, 16:00 PM
1	Charles Blum	Switzerland	121 m	—
2	Niklaus Stump	Switzerland	97 m	—
3	Hans Zurbriggen	Switzerland	97 m	—
4	Fritz Tschannen	Switzerland	102 m	—
5	Rudi Finžgar	Yugoslavia	95 m	—
6	Ivo Javornik	Yugoslavia	94 m	—
8	Jean Mounier	France	104 m	—
9	Régis Charlet	France	103 m	—
10	Lojze Razinger	Yugoslavia	95 m	—
11	Jože Langus	Yugoslavia	92 m	—
12	Janez Rožič	Yugoslavia	89 m	—
13	Ivo Razboršek	Yugoslavia	92 m	—
14	Jože Zalokar	Yugoslavia	N/A	—
15	Antoni Wieczorek	Poland	97 m	—

=== Competition: Day 2 ===
15 March 1948 — 10:00 AM — Five rounds — chronological order

Bib	Name	Country	Round 1	Round 2	Round 3
1	Fritz Tschannen	Switzerland	102 m	109 m	109 m
2	Niklaus Stump	Switzerland	93 m	98 m	93 m*
3	Hans Zurbriggen	Switzerland	100 m	101 m	105 m
4	Antoni Wieczorek	Poland	79 m	85 m	98 m
5	Rudi Finžgar	Yugoslavia	88 m	105 m	—
6	Andrzej Gąsienica Daniel	Poland	69 m	71 m	76 m
7	Tadeusz Kozak	Poland	79 m	80 m	—
Afternoon jumps
1	Fritz Tschannen	Switzerland	114 m	120 m	—
2	Niklaus Stump	Switzerland	108 m	109 m	—
3	Hans Zurbriggen	Switzerland	106 m	114 m	—
4	Rudi Finžgar	Yugoslavia	118 m	118 m	—
5	Jean Mounier	France	86 m	102 m	—
6	Andrzej Gąsienica Daniel	Poland	81 m	80 m	—
7	Antoni Wieczorek	Poland	99 m	100 m	—

=== Competition: Day 3 ===
16 March 1948 — 9:50 AM — Three rounds — chronological order

Bib	Name	Country	Round 1	Round 2	Round 3
1	Ivo Javornik	Yugoslavia	91 m	85 m	—
2	Lojze Razinger	Yugoslavia	88 m	90 m	86 m
3	Janez Rožič	Yugoslavia	86 m	86 m	85 m
4	Jože Langus	Yugoslavia	81 m	84 m	81 m
5	Ivo Razboršek	Yugoslavia	90 m	89 m	—
6	Bine Rogelj	Yugoslavia	73 m	78 m	77 m
7	Franc Pribošek	Yugoslavia	102 m	100 m	—
8	Arsène Lucchini	France	98 m	103 m	97 m
9	Antoni Wieczorek	Poland	86 m	91 m	82 m
10	Andrzej Gąsienica Daniel	Poland	69 m	80 m	79 m
11	Régis Charlet	France	101 m	99 m	93 m
12	Jean Mounier	France	97 m	—	—
13	Tadeusz Kozak	Poland	74 m	88 m	—
14	Janko Mežik	Yugoslavia	103 m	96 m	—
15	Rudi Finžgar	Yugoslavia	104 m	98 m	—
16	Fritz Tschannen	Switzerland	102 m	98 m	—
17	Niklaus Stump	Switzerland	100 m	—	—
18	Hans Zurbriggen	Switzerland	99 m	96 m	—

=== Competition: Day 4 ===
17 March 1948 — Two rounds — ranking incomplete — points N/A

Rank	Bib	Name	Country	Round 1	Round 2
1	14	Fritz Tschannen	Switzerland	97 m	97 m
2	15	Hans Zurbriggen	Switzerland	96 m	91 m
N/A	1	Janko Mežik	Yugoslavia	99 m	95 m
N/A	2	Franc Pribošek	Yugoslavia	100 m	95 m
N/A	3	Ivo Razboršek	Yugoslavia	90 m	87 m
N/A	4	Jože Langus	Yugoslavia	92 m	88 m
N/A	5	Lojze Razinger	Yugoslavia	90 m	90 m
N/A	6	Andrzej Gąsienica Daniel	Poland	83 m	82 m
N/A	7	Antoni Wieczorek	Poland	92 m	91 m
N/A	8	Tadeusz Kozak	Poland	93 m	85 m
N/A	9	Rudi Finžgar	Yugoslavia	99 m	100 m
N/A	10	Jaroslav Lukeš	Czechoslovakia	78 m	81 m
N/A	11	Miloslav Bělonožník	Czechoslovakia	88 m	92 m
N/A	12	Zdeněk Remsa	Czechoslovakia	92 m	91 m
N/A	13	Lenemayer	Czechoslovakia	87 m	94 m
N/A	16	Ivo Javornik	Yugoslavia	85 m	84 m
N/A	17	Arsène Lucchini	France	99 m	100 m
N/A	18	Bine Rogelj	Yugoslavia	80 m	80 m

Not recognized. Crash at WR!
Yugoslavian national record!
World record!
Fall or touch!

== Official results ==
=== International Ski Flying Week ===
14–17 March 1948 – the best jump

Rank	Name	Dist.
1	(Switzerland) Fritz Tschannen	120 m
2	(Switzerland) Hans Zurbriggen	114 m
3	(Switzerland) Charles Blum	113 m

== Ski flying world records ==
Date	Name	Country	Metres	Feet
14 March 1948	Janez Polda	Yugoslavia	120	394
14 March 1948	Charles Blum	Switzerland	121	397
15 March 1948	Fritz Tschannen	Switzerland	120	394

Not recognized! Touch at world record distance.
Not recognized! Crash at world record distance.
