= Planica 1949 =

Ski jumping competition in Slovenia

Coordinates: 46°28′43″N 13°43′16″E

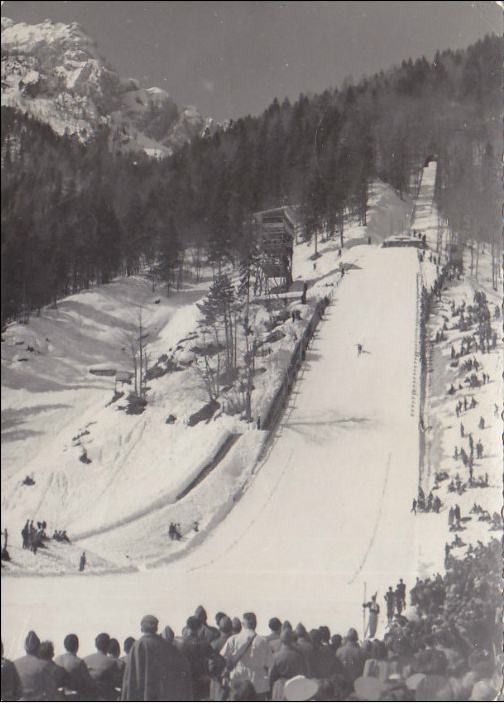
- Host city: Planica, FPR Yugoslavia
- Sport: Ski jumping
- Events: International 1 (20 March 1947); International 2 (27 March 1947)
- Main venue: Srednja Bloudkova K80

Planica 1949 was an International ski jumping week with two competitions on a new K80 hill, held on 20 and 27 March 1949 in Planica, PR Slovenia, FPR Yugoslavia. Over 20,000 people were gathered.

== Schedule ==
Date	Event	Rounds	Longest jump of the day	Visitors
19 March 1949	Premiere hill test	N/A	77 metres (253 ft) by Janez Polda	N/A
20 March 1949	International event 1 (opening)	2	77.5 metres (254 ft) by Janez Polda	N/A
21 March 1949	Training 1	N/A	69 metres (226 ft) by Aldo Trivella	N/A
22 March 1949	Training 2	4	78 metres (256 ft) by Carlo De Lorenzi	N/A
23 March 1949	Training 3	4	76 metres (249 ft) by Janez Polda	N/A
24 March 1949	Training 4	3	80.5 metres (264 ft) by Janez Polda	N/A
25 March 1949	Schedule free: a day-off for ski jumpers			
26 March 1949	Training 5	—	high temperatures; melting snow	—
27 March 1949	International event 2 (closing)	2	86 metres (282 ft) by Janez Polda	15,000

== Competitions ==
On 19 March 1949, International Ski Jumping Week has officially started with premiere jumps on the new Srednja Bloudkova K80 normal hill. Janez Polda was the longest with 77 metres.

On 20 March 1949, Opening international competition was on schedule, first of two events this week. Evert Karlsson from Sweden won the premiere event with 74 and 75 metres. It was a tribute to all the victims of Slovenian Liberation front.

On 21 March 1949, first training was on schedule with 19 jumpers on start: 15 Yugoslavs, 3 Italians and 1 Finnish. The longest jump of the training was set by Aldo Trivella at 69 metres.

On 22 March 1949, second training was on schedule on two to four rounds with 22 jumpers on start: 13 Yugoslavs, 5 Swiss, 3 Italians and 1 Finnish. The longest jump of the training was set by Carlo De Lorenzi at 78 metres.

On 23 March 1949, third training was on schedule with 100 jumps in four rounds and 31 competitors on start: 15 Yugoslavs, 4 Swiss, 2 Swedish and 2 Finnish and 1 Austrian. The longest jump of the training was set by Janez Polda at 80.5 metres.

On 24 March 1949, fourth training was on schedule in three rounds and 24 competitors on start: 18 Yugoslavs, 6 Swiss, 3 Italians, 2 Austrians, 1 Swedish and 1 Finnish. The longest jump of the training was set by Janez Polda at 76 metres.

On 26 March 1949, fifth training was on schedule, but it was canceled without a single jump due to high temperatures and melting snow. Hill had to be prepared for the Sunday international event with snow plates from hill surroundings.

On 27 March 1949, second international competition in front of 15,000 people was on schedule, to close the Planica week events with 31 jumpers on start. Janez Polda won the event with 76.5 and 80 metres.

=== Hill test ===
19 March 1949 — One round — chronological not available

Bib	Name	Country	Round 1
N/A	Janez Polda	Yugoslavia	77 m
N/A	Bine Rogelj	Yugoslavia	75.5 m
N/A	Rudi FInžgar	Yugoslavia	+70 m
N/A	Ivo Razboršek	Yugoslavia	+70 m
N/A	Fritz Tschannen	Switzerland	N/A
N/A	Carlo De Lorenzi	Italy	N/A
N/A	Andreas Däscher	Switzerland	N/A
N/A	Walter Steinegger	Austria	N/A

=== International competition 1 ===
20 March 1949 — Two rounds — official results — chronological order incomplete

Rank	Bib	Name	Country	Round 1	Round 2	Points
1	27	Evert Karlsson	Sweden	74 m	75 m	217.0
2	18	Janez Polda	Yugoslavia	77.5 m	74.5 m	214.0
3	19	Karl Holmström	Sweden	74 m	69.5 m	208.5
4	20	Lasse Johansson	Finland	69 m	69 m	201.5
5	26	Fritz Tschannen	Switzerland	66 m	69 m	200.0
6	22	Carlo De Lorenzi	Italy	65.5 m	71 m	194.0
7	2	Andreas Däscher	Switzerland	70.5 m	66.5 m	193.5
8	5	Rafael Viljamaa	Finland	63 m	69.5 m	192.5
9	3	Aldo Trivella	Italy	71.5 m	66 m	192.0
10	14	Hans Zurbriggen	Switzerland	67 m	67 m	191.0
11	9	Walter Steinegger	Austria	70 m	64 m	187.0
12	23	Bine Rogelj	Yugoslavia	63 m	67 m	186.5
	15	Hubert Neuper	Austria	63 m	67 m	186.5
	12	Franc Pribošek	Yugoslavia	67.5 m	64.5 m	186.5
15	13	Marjan Gašperšič	Yugoslavia	68 m	62.5 m	183.5
16	25	Fritz Schneider	Switzerland	63 m	65 m	180.5
17	8	Slavko Šušteršič	Yugoslavia	66.5 m	60 m	178.5
18	1	Georg Keller	Switzerland	65 m	60 m	178.0
	28	Rudi FInžgar	Yugoslavia	63 m	65 m	178.0
20	31	Odon Slabe	Yugoslavia	64.5 m	63.5 m	176.5
	16	Jože Langus	Yugoslavia	58 m	64 m	176.5
22	11	Ivo Razboršek	Yugoslavia	63 m	58 m	175.5
23	30	Piero Pennachhio	Italy	64 m	58 m	171.5
24	7	Albin Adlešič	Yugoslavia	57 m	59 m	163.0
	6	Ljubo Razinger	Yugoslavia	58 m	58 m	163.0
26	24	Franc Mandeljc	Yugoslavia	68 m	70.5 m	161.5
27	17	Franc Sodja	Yugoslavia	60 m	53 m	155.0
28	29	Stane Stanovnik	Yugoslavia	63.5 m	56 m	135.0
29	21	Slavko Avsenik	Yugoslavia	58 m	63.5 m	130.5
N/A	4	Janko Mežik	Yugoslavia	68.5 m	—	N/A
N/A	10	Karel Klančnik	Yugoslavia	68 m	—	N/A

=== Training 3 ===
23 March 1949 — Four rounds — best jump and average style

Bib	Name	Country	Longest	Style
N/A	Janez Polda	Yugoslavia	76 m	17
N/A	Karl Holmström	Sweden	75.5 m	18
N/A	Rafael Viljamaa	Finland	70.5 m	17
N/A	Fritz Tschannen	Switzerland	72 m	18
N/A	Andreas Däscher	Switzerland	71 m	16.5
N/A	Hans Zurbriggen	Switzerland	69 m	16.5
N/A	Jacques Perretten	Switzerland	69.5 m	16
N/A	Fritz Schneider	Switzerland	68.5 m	16
N/A	Georg Keller	Switzerland	65 m	15.5
N/A	Carlo De Lorenzi	Italy	73.5 m	14.5
N/A	Aldo Trivella	Italy	67 m	15.5
N/A	Piero Pennachhio	Italy	66 m	15
N/A	Walter Steinegger	Austria	71 m	17
N/A	Hubert Neuper	Austria	65 m	14.5
N/A	Karel Klančnik	Yugoslavia	70 m	16.5
N/A	Rudi FInžgar	Yugoslavia	73 m	16
N/A	Slavko Šušteršič	Yugoslavia	62 m	14
N/A	Jože Langus	Yugoslavia	64 m	15
N/A	Slavko Avsenik	Yugoslavia	63 m	15
N/A	Albin Adlešič	Yugoslavia	59 m	13.5
N/A	Modic	Yugoslavia	54 m	12
N/A	Ivo Razboršek	Yugoslavia	65 m	15.5
N/A	Ivan or Franc Sodja	Yugoslavia	60.5 m	13.5
N/A	Ljubo Razinger	Yugoslavia	56 m	13.5
N/A	Stane Stanovnik	Yugoslavia	61 m	14.5
N/A	Marjan Gašperšič	Yugoslavia	66.5 m	13.5
N/A	Odon Slabe	Yugoslavia	60 m	14.5
N/A	Bine Rogelj	Yugoslavia	73 m	16.5
N/A	Janko Mežik	Yugoslavia	66 m	16
N/A	Jože Zidar	Yugoslavia	56 m	13.5
N/A	Dolenc	Yugoslavia	49 m	11.5

=== Training 4 ===
24 March 1949 — Three rounds — best jump and average style

Bib	Name	Country	Longest	Style
Trial	Janko Mežik	Yugoslavia	N/A	N/A
N/A	Evert Karlsson	Sweden	79 m	18.5
N/A	Lasse Johansson	Finland	71 m	18.5
N/A	Fritz Tschannen	Switzerland	74.5 m	18.5
N/A	Janez Polda	Yugoslavia	80.5 m	17
N/A	Rudi FInžgar	Yugoslavia	72 m	15.5
N/A	Piero Pennachhio	Italy	58 m	15
N/A	Ljubo Razinger	Yugoslavia	52 m	13.5
N/A	Karel Klančnik	Yugoslavia	67.5 m	16.5
N/A	Jože Zidar	Yugoslavia	57 m	15
N/A	Franc Pribošek	Yugoslavia	70 m	16.5
N/A	Stane Stanovnik	Yugoslavia	66 m	16
N/A	Aldo Trivella	Italy	64 m	16
N/A	Ivan or Franc Sodja	Yugoslavia	58 m	13
N/A	Marjan Gašperšič	Yugoslavia	60 m	14.5
N/A	Andreas Däscher	Switzerland	71 m	17
N/A	Jože Langus	Yugoslavia	65.5 m	15.5
N/A	Ivo Razboršek	Yugoslavia	55 m	15.5
N/A	Albin Adlešič	Yugoslavia	56 m	14
N/A	Bine Rogelj	Yugoslavia	73 m	16.5
N/A	Karl Holmström	Sweden	69 m	18
N/A	Rafael Viljamaa	Finland	70.5 m	18
N/A	Carlo De Lorenzi	Italy	66.5 m	16.5
N/A	Jacques Perretten	Switzerland	71 m	17
N/A	Fritz Schneider	Switzerland	63 m	14.5
N/A	Hubert Neuper	Austria	63 m	16.5
N/A	Modic	Yugoslavia	53 m	N/A

=== International competition 2 ===
27 March 1949 — 10 AM — Two rounds — official results — chronological order incomplete

Rank	Bib	Name	Country	Round 1	Round 2	Points
1	1	Janez Polda	Yugoslavia	76.5 m	86 m	223.5
2	4	Lasse Johansson	Finland	72.5 m	78 m	216.0
3	N/A	Rafael Viljamaa	Finland	75 m	75 m	213.0
4	N/A	Bine Rogelj	Yugoslavia	75 m	73 m	207.5
5	N/A	Jacques Perreten	Switzerland	80 m	74 m	203.5
6	N/A	Evert Karlsson	Sweden	85.5 m	78 m	202.5
	N/A	Hans Zurbriggen	Switzerland	69 m	72 m	202.5
8	N/A	Walter Steinegger	Austria	74 m	70.5 m	198.5
9	N/A	Andreas Däscher	Switzerland	68 m	71.5 m	197.5
10	N/A	Rudi FInžgar	Yugoslavia	72 m	74 m	197.0
11	N/A	Hubert Neuper	Austria	68 m	70 m	191.0
12	N/A	Georg Keller	Switzerland	64 m	72.5 m	190.0
13	3	Karl Holmström	Sweden	76 m	77.5 m	188.0
14	N/A	Carlo De Lorenzi	Italy	67 m	65 m	187.5
15	N/A	Franc Pribošek	Yugoslavia	68 m	71 m	186.0
16	N/A	Aldo Trivella	Italy	66 m	62 m	182.5
17	N/A	Janko Mežik	Yugoslavia	67 m	64 m	181.5
18	N/A	Albin Adlešič	Yugoslavia	67 m	63.5 m	176.0
19	N/A	Jože Langus	Yugoslavia	67.5 m	64 m	175.5
20	N/A	Marjan Gašperšič	Yugoslavia	67 m	63 m	175.0
21	2	Fritz Tschannen	Switzerland	73 m	67.5 m	174.0
22	N/A	Ljubo Razinger	Yugoslavia	62.5 m	63 m	171.0
23	N/A	Slavko Avsenik	Yugoslavia	58 m	68 m	170.0
24	N/A	Ivo Razboršek	Yugoslavia	59 m	63.5 m	167.0
25	N/A	Karel Klančnik	Yugoslavia	69.5 m	72 m	166.0
26	N/A	Fritz Schneider	Switzerland	62 m	61 m	163.0
27	N/A	Piero Pennachhio	Italy	55.5 m	58.5 m	161.0
28	N/A	Ivan Sodja	Yugoslavia	56.5 m	59.5 m	160.5
29	N/A	Stane Stanovnik	Yugoslavia	59.5 m	61.5 m	153.5
N/A	N/A	Odon Slabe	Yugoslavia	N/A	—	N/A
N/A	N/A	Slavko Šušteršič	Yugoslavia	N/A	—	N/A

Fall or touch!

== Hill specifications ==
Top of the 11 metres of inrun was artificial, otherwise hill was completely natural. New K80 hill technical data:

- 108 metres — total height difference
- 46 metres — inrun height difference
- 101 metres — inrun length
- 2.8 metres — take-off table height
- 62 metres — outrun length
- 78 metres — critical point
- 84 metres — jury distance
- 4 metres — inrun width
- 6 metres — take-off table width
- 18 metres — landing zone width
- 25 metres — outrun width
