= Planica 1950 =

International ski flying week in 1950

Coordinates: 46°28′43″N 13°43′16″E

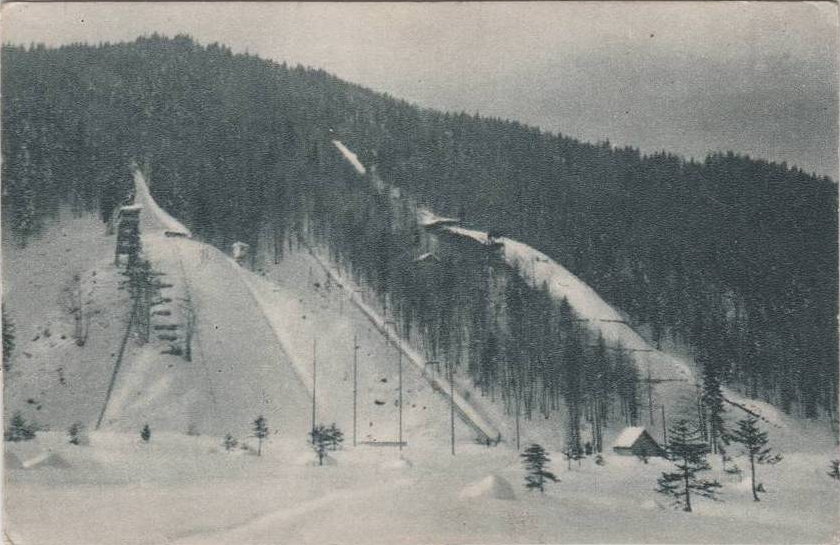
- K80 (on the left) --- K120 (on the right)
- Host city: Planica, FPR Yugoslavia
- Sports: Ski jumping, ski flying
- Events: K80 - International 1 (12 March 1950); K120 - Ski Flying Study (15-17 March 1950); K120 - Exhibition (18 March 1950); K80 - International 2 (18 March 1950)
- Main venue: Srednja Bloudkova K80; Bloudkova velikanka K120

Planica 1950 was an International ski flying week with four competitions held from 12—19 March 1950 in Planica, PR Slovenia, FPR Yugoslavia. A total over 50,000 people has gathered in the whole week.

== Schedule ==
Date	Event	Rounds	Longest jump of the day	Visitors
12 March 1950	K80 - International event 1	3	79.5 metres (261 ft) by Thorleif Schjelderup	N/A
13 March 1950	K80 - Training 1	4	82 metres (269 ft) by Janez Polda	3,000
14 March 1950	K80 - Training 2	1	80 metres (262 ft) by Thorleif Schjelderup	N/A
14 March 1950	K120 - Training 1	—	97 metres (318 ft) by Thorleif Schjelderup	N/A
15 March 1950	K120 - Ski Flying Study: Day 1	3	104 metres (341 ft) by Sverre Kronvold	N/A
15 March 1950	K80 - Training 3	N/A	N/A	N/A
16 March 1950	K120 - Ski Flying Study: Day 2	3	101 metres (331 ft) by Janez Polda	N/A
16 March 1950	K80 - Training 4	N/A	76 metres (249 ft) by Bine Rogelj	N/A
17 March 1950	K120 - Ski Flying Study: Day 3	2	114 metres (374 ft) by Janez Polda	8,000
17 March 1950	K80 - Training 5	N/A	N/A	8,000
18 March 1950	K120 - Training 2	N/A	N/A	N/A
18 March 1950	K80 - Training 6	N/A	N/A	N/A
18 March 1950	k120 - Exhibition event	2	114 metres (374 ft) by Rudi Finžgar	30,000
18 March 1950	K80 - International event 2	N/A	80.5 metres (264 ft) by Sverre Stenersen	30,000

== Competitions ==
On 12 March 1950, International Ski Flying Week has officially started with trial round with the first of two International competitions on Srednja Bloudkova K80 normal hill this week. Thorleif Schjelderup won the competition with 79.5 and 77.5 metres.

On 13 March 1950, training with three to four rounds the International competition on Srednja Bloudkova K80 normal hill was on schedule in front of 3,000 people. Janez Polda was the longest with 82 metres.

On 14 March 1950, first training on Bloudkova velikanka K120 large hill was on schedule with the distance of the day at 89 metres by Rudi Finžgar. At 10:30 AM training was also held on K80 normal hill and Sverre Stenersen was the longest with 80 metres.

On 15 March 1950, first day of Ski Flying Study competition with three rounds on K120 was on schedule with the distance of the day at 107 metres by Janez Polda. Some of the Yugoslavian and Norwegian ski jumpers also trained at K80 hill.

On 16 March 1950, second day of Ski Flying Study competition with three rounds on K120 was on schedule with the distance of the day at 101 metres by Janez Polda. Ski jumpers were training also at K80 hill.

On 17 March 1950, third day of Ski Flying Study competition with two rounds on K120 was on schedule with the distance of the day at 114 metres by Janez Polda in front of 8,000 people. At the training at K80 hill, Janez Polda was the longest at 76 metres.

On 18 March 1950, only trainings on both normal and large hill were held on the request of Austrian and Norwegian ski jumpers.

On 19 March 1950, the final day of International Ski Flying week was on schedule with two competitions in front of 30,000 people. Exhibition event on Bloudkova velianka K120 large in two rounds was on schedule first and Rudi Finžgar won the event with 114 metres. Only 15 minutes after the end of exhibition, the whole crowd moved to the neighbour K80 normal hill where they finished with international competition and Sverre Stenersen won this event with 75.5 and 80.5 metres.

== Normal hill ==
=== International competition 1 ===
12 March 1950 — Two rounds — official results — chronological order incomplete

Rank	Bib	Name	Country	Round 1	Round 2	Points
1	21	Thorleif Schjelderup	Norway	79.5 m	77.5 m	219.6
2	18	Sverre Kronvold	Norway	74 m	70.5 m	208.1
3	22	Janez Polda	Yugoslavia	77 m	75 m	202.6
4	N/A	Karel Klančnik	Yugoslavia	72 m	69 m	199.3
5	4	Slattsveen	Norway	76.5 m	67 m	191.3
6	17	Sverre Stenersen	Norway	73 m	67 m	191.0
7	N/A	Bine Rogelj	Yugoslavia	70 m	69 m	190.2
8	16	Hoysaeter	Norway	69 m	65 m	187.7
9	N/A	Jože Langus	Yugoslavia	68 m	65 m	186.4
10	24	Aldo Trivella	Italy	69 m	65 m	185.7
11	N/A	Ivo Razboršek	Yugoslavia	63.5 m	60 m	179.3
12	N/A	Rudi Finžgar	Yugoslavia	68.5 m	68 m	179.2
13	N/A	Jože Zalokar	Yugoslavia	65 m	65 m	179.0
14	1	Bruno Da Col	Italy	71 m	64 m	178.9
15	2	Luigi Pennacchio	Italy	72 m	72.5 m	177.1
16	19	Hakonsen	Norway	72 m	72.5 m	170.6
17	3	Slavko Avsenik	Yugoslavia	62 m	65 m	168.6
18	23	Carlo De Lorenzi	Italy	73 m	70 m	167.9
19	N/A	Tone Razinger	Yugoslavia	62 m	59 m	163.8
20	N/A	Janez Saksida	Yugoslavia	59 m	57.6 m	154.2
21	N/A	Marjan Gašperšič	Yugoslavia	66 m	65 m	142.8
22	N/A	Albin Adlešič	Yugoslavia	67 m	57.5 m	132.1
23	N/A	Mato Krznarič	Yugoslavia	57.5 m	53 m	125.4
—	20	Odon Slabe	Yugoslavia	N/A	—	—

=== International competition 2 ===
11 AM — 19 March 1950 — Two rounds — official results — chronological order incomplete

Rank	Bib	Name	Country	Round 1	Round 2	Points
1	18	Sverre Stenersen	Norway	75.5 m	80.5 m	220.5
2	6	Hakonsen	Norway	76 m	74 m	219.5
3	16	Sverre Kronvold	Norway	74.5 m	75 m	217.5
4	3	Thorleif Schjelderup	Norway	75 m	73 m	214.0
5	N/A	Janez Polda	Yugoslavia	73 m	73.5 m	211.0
6	N/A	Bine Rogelj	Yugoslavia	71 m	76 m	208.5
7	N/A	Rudi Finžgar	Yugoslavia	74.5 m	75 m	207.0
8	10	Hoysaeter	Norway	74 m	69 m	202.5
9	4	Grommer	Austria	71 m	69 m	193.0
10	N/A	Karel Klančnik	Yugoslavia	68 m	67.5 m	191.0
11	2	Jože Langus	Yugoslavia	70 m	66 m	188.5
12	N/A	Helmut Hadwiger	Austria	66 m	69.5 m	188.5
13	11	Odon Slabe	Yugoslavia	67 m	66 m	187.5
14	9	Slavko Avsenik	Yugoslavia	66 m	66 m	187.0
15	12	Luigi Pennacchio	Italy	65 m	65.5 m	184.5
16	7	Aldo Trivella	Italy	65.5 m	65.5 m	184.5
N/A	1	Albin Adlešič	Yugoslavia	N/A	N/A	N/A
N/A	5	Doujak	Austria	N/A	N/A	N/A
N/A	8	Marjan Gašperšič	Yugoslavia	N/A	N/A	N/A
N/A	13	Jože Zalokar	Yugoslavia	N/A	N/A	N/A
N/A	14	Ljubo Razinger	Yugoslavia	N/A	N/A	N/A
N/A	15	Janez Saksida	Yugoslavia	N/A	N/A	N/A
N/A	17	Stane Stanovnik	Yugoslavia	N/A	N/A	N/A
N/A	N/A	Bruno Da Col	Italy	N/A	N/A	N/A
N/A	N/A	Bernsteiner	Austria	N/A	N/A	N/A
N/A	N/A	Sodja	Yugoslavia	N/A	N/A	N/A
N/A	N/A	Jože Javornik	Yugoslavia	N/A	N/A	N/A
N/A	N/A	Franc Mandeljc	Yugoslavia	N/A	N/A	N/A
N/A	N/A	Ivo Razboršek	Yugoslavia	N/A	N/A	N/A

== Large hill ==
=== Training ===
14 March 1950 — Four rounds — chronological order

Bib	Name	Country	Round 1	Round 2	Round 3	Round 4
1	Rudi Finžgar	Yugoslavia	66 m	83 m	81 m	89 m
2	Thorleif Schjelderup	Norway	77 m	85 m	90 m	97 m
3	Bine Rogelj	Yugoslavia	74.5 m	83 m	81 m	80 m
4	Ivo Razboršek	Yugoslavia	67 m	62 m	77 m	—
5	Aldo Trivella	Italy	69 m	82 m	79 m	—
6	Grommer	Austria	76 m	88 m	89 m	—
7	Sverre Kronvold	Norway	78 m	85 m	85 m	—
8	Sverre Stenersen	Norway	78 m	90 m	90 m	—
9	Janez Polda	Yugoslavia	81 m	89 m	93 m	—
10	Karel Klančnik	Yugoslavia	73 m	87 m	91 m	—
11	Luigi Pennacchio	Italy	69 m	80 m	81 m	—
12	Bruno Da Col	Italy	72 m	84 m	81 m	—
13	Carlo De Lorenzi	Italy	88 m	92 m	—	—
14	Slaatsveen	Norway	69 m	88 m	—	—
15	Hoysaeter	Norway	69 m	88 m	—	—

=== Ski Flying Study: Day 1 ===
Morning — 15 March 1950 — Three rounds — chronological order

Bib	Name	Country	Round 1	Round 2	Round 3
1	Bine Rogelj	Yugoslavia	92 m	92 m	93 m
2	Rudi Finžgar	Yugoslavia	87 m	89 m	95 m
3	Ivo Razboršek	Yugoslavia	72 m	78 m	78 m
4	Aldo Trivella	Italy	78 m	79 m	83 m
5	Luigi Pennacchio	Italy	88 m	84 m	90 m
6	Bruno Da Col	Italy	90 m	83 m	92 m
7	Carlo De Lorenzi	Italy	100 m	96 m	100 m
8	Grommer	Austria	93 m	92 m	97 m
9	Janez Polda	Yugoslavia	101 m	95 m	107 m
10	Thorleif Schjelderup	Norway	94 m	97 m	106 m
11	Hoysaeter	Norway	87 m	88 m	100 m
12	Sverre Stenersen	Norway	95 m	90 m	101 m
13	Sverre Kronvold	Norway	94 m	96 m	104 m
14	Karel Klančnik	Yugoslavia	90 m	87 m	97 m
15	Hakonsen	Norway	89 m	—	—

=== Ski Flying Study: Day 2 ===
16 March 1950 — Two rounds — chronological order

Bib	Name	Country	Round 1	Round 2	Round 3
1	Thorleif Schjelderup	Norway	88 m	93 m	97 m
2	Sverre Stenersen	Norway	89 m	93 m	96 m
3	Hoiseter	Norway	81 m	81 m	87 m
4	Sverre Kronvold	Norway	88 m	49 m	98 m
5	Grommer	Austria	82 m	92 m	96 m
6	Luigi Pennacchio	Italy	83 m	88 m	86 m
7	Bruno Da Col	Italy	76 m	75 m	87 m
8	Aldo Trivella	Italy	73 m	76 m	80 m
9	Janez Polda	Yugoslavia	92 m	101 m	101 m
10	Bine Rogelj	Yugoslavia	80 m	81 m	—
11	Ivo Razboršek	Yugoslavia	70 m	74 m	75 m
12	Karel Klančnik	Yugoslavia	87 m	90 m	93 m
13	Rudi Finžgar	Yugoslavia	87 m	91 m	90 m
14	Hakonsen	Norway	83 m	93 m	—
15	Slattsveen	Norway	75 m	95 m	—

=== Ski Flying Study: Day 3 ===
17 March 1950 — Two rounds — chronological order

Bib	Name	Country	Round 1	Round 2
1	Janez Polda	Yugoslavia	106 m	114 m
2	Ivo Razboršek	Yugoslavia	82 m	90 m
3	Jože Zidar	Yugoslavia	72.5 m	83 m
4	Luigi Pennacchio	Italy	90 m	97 m
5	Karel Klančnik	Yugoslavia	100.5 m	106 m
6	Rudi Finžgar	Yugoslavia	103.5 m	110 m
7	Grommer	Austria	99 m	105 m
8	Aldo Trivella	Italy	83.5 m	90 m
9	Bruno Da Col	Italy	94 m	96 m
10	Bine Rogelj	Yugoslavia	99 m	103 m

=== Exhibition event ===
10 AM — 19 March 1950 — Two rounds — chronological order incomplete

Bib	Name	Country	Round 1	Round 2
1	Thorleif Schjelderup	Norway	106 m	105.5 m
2	Grommer	Austria	110 m	109 m
3	Doujak	Austria	95 m	94 m
4	Janez Polda	Yugoslavia	111 m	103.5 m
5	Hakonsen	Norway	105 m	—
6	Sverre Kronvold	Norway	109 m	94 m
7	Sverre Stenersen	Norway	99 m	—
8	Rudi Finžgar	Yugoslavia	105 m	114 m
N/A	Slattsveen	Norway	112 m	101 m
N/A	Aldo Trivella	Italy	96 m	92 m
N/A	Hoysaeter	Norway	101 m	—
N/A	Helmut Hadwiger	Austria	90 m	—
N/A	Jože Zidar	Yugoslavia	98 m	100 m
N/A	Luigi Pennacchio	Italy	101 m	—
N/A	Bruno Da Col	Italy	99 m	—
N/A	Bine Rogelj	Yugoslavia	100 m	110 m
N/A	Karel Klančnik	Yugoslavia	100 m	108 m
N/A	Ivo Razboršek	Yugoslavia	89 m	—

Fall or touch!

== Official results ==
=== Ski Flying Study ===
15-17 March 1950 – the best jump

Rank	Name	Dist.
1	(Socialist Federal Republic of Yugoslavia) Janez Polda	114 m
2	(Socialist Federal Republic of Yugoslavia) Rudi Finžgar	110 m
3	(Norway) Sverre Kronvold	104 m

=== Exhibition ===
19 March 1950 – 10 AM – the best jump

Rank	Name	Dist.
1	(Socialist Federal Republic of Yugoslavia) Rudi Finžgar	114 m
2	(Norway) Slattsveen	112 m
3	(Socialist Federal Republic of Yugoslavia) Janez Polda	111 m
