= Planica 1953 =

International ski jumping week

Coordinates: 46°28′43″N 13°43′16″E

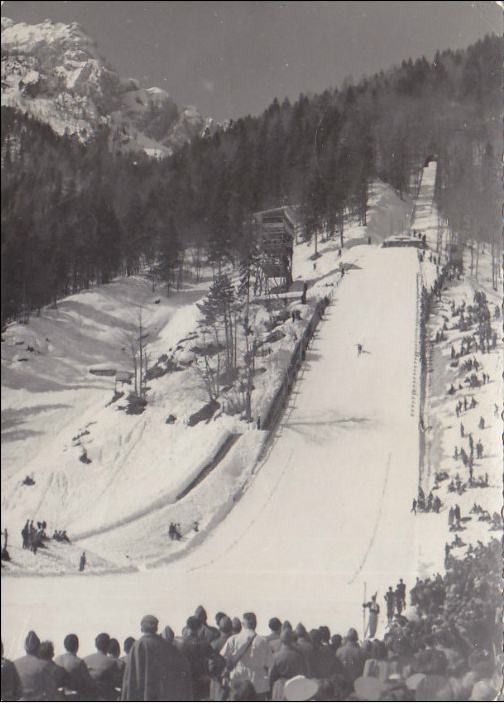
- Host city: Planica, FPR Yugoslavia
- Sport: Ski jumping
- Events: International
- Main venue: Srednja Bloudkova K80

Planica 1953 was an International ski jumping week with international competition on Srednja Bloudkova K80 hill, held on 8 March 1953 in Planica, PR Slovenia, FPR Yugoslavia. Over 11,000 people has gathered.

Cockta, the most famous Slovenian soft drink, was introduced to the public for the very first time in Planica, advertised on huge billboards as main sponsor and became instant hit.

== Schedule ==
Date	Event	Rounds	Longest jump of the day	Visitors
6 March 1953	Training 1	3	85 metres (279 ft) by Bine Rogelj	1,000
7 March 1953	Training 2	4	78 metres (256 ft) by Rudi Finžgar	—
8 March 1953	International event	2	77.5 metres (254 ft) by Hermann Anwander	10,000

== Competitions ==
On 6 March 1953, first training with three rounds in front of around 1,000 spectators was on schedule. Bine Rogelj was the longest with 85 metres.

On 7 March 1953, second training with four rounds was on schedule. Rudi Finžgar was the longest with 78 metres.

On 8 March 1953, international competition with 38 competitors from Yugoslavia, Austria, France, West Germany, Switzerland and Italy on K80 normal hill was on schedule. Hermann Anwander won.

=== Training 1 ===
6 March 1953 – Four rounds – incomplete

Bib	Name	Country	Round 1	Round 2	Round 3
N/A	Bine Rogelj	Yugoslavia	76 m	79 m	85 m —
N/A	Janez Polda	Yugoslavia	81 m	82.5 m	84 m
N/A	Jože Zalokar	Yugoslavia	78 m	77 m	84 m
N/A	Albin Adlešič	Yugoslavia	78 m	81 m	83 m
N/A	Rudi Finžgar	Yugoslavia	70 m	82 m	82.5 m
N/A	Karel Klančnik	Yugoslavia	67 m	75 m	78 m
N/A	Jože Langus	Yugoslavia	74 m	74 m	69 m
N/A	Henri Thiolière	France	65 m	65 m	69 m
N/A	Toni Landenhammer	West Germany	75 m	78 m	79.5 m
N/A	Avanzini	Italy	62 m	64 m	70 m
N/A	Braz	Yugoslavia	74 m	74 m	75 m
N/A	Babnik	Yugoslavia	69 m	69 m	70 m
N/A	Lojze Gorjanc	Yugoslavia	63 m	66 m	68 m
N/A	Franko	Yugoslavia	62 m	62 m	70 m

=== Training 2 ===
7 March 1953 – Four rounds – incomplete

Bib	Name	Country	Round 1	Round 2	Round 3	Round 4
N/A	Albin Adlešič	Yugoslavia	70 m	73 m	74 m	—
N/A	Rudi Finžgar	Yugoslavia	78 m	77.5 m	75.5 m	—
N/A	Jože Zalokar	Yugoslavia	74 m	75 m	—	—
N/A	Arsène Lucchini	France	69 m	73 m	71 m	—
N/A	Régis Rey	France	68 m	71 m	—	—
N/A	Bine Rogelj	Yugoslavia	74 m	76 m	72.5 m	—
N/A	Moser	Austria	68 m	74 m	73 m	73 m
N/A	Siegfried Kostner	Austria	67 m	73 m	73 m	73 m
N/A	Karel Klančnik	Yugoslavia	65 m	72 m	74 m	72 m
N/A	Rudolf Bärtschi	Switzerland	66 m	68 m	69 m	70 m
N/A	Hermann Anwander	West Germany	73 m	84 m	77 m	—
N/A	Toni Landenhammer	West Germany	74 m	72 m	72 m	72.5 m
N/A	Herbert Schiffner	Austria	67 m	73 m	75 m	74 m
N/A	Janez Matul	Yugoslavia	64 m	75.5 m	77 m	—
N/A	Jože Zidar	Yugoslavia	63 m	71 m	69 m	—
N/A	Babnik	Yugoslavia	N/A			
N/A	Braz	Yugoslavia	N/A			

Fall or touch!

== International competition ==
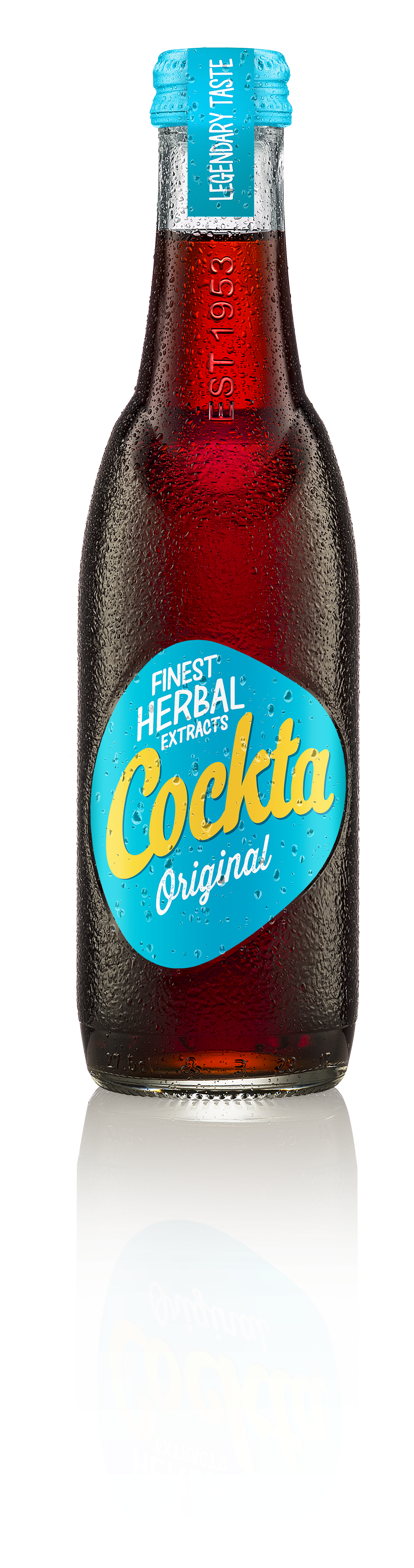

8 March 1953 — Two rounds — official results

Rank	Name	Country	Round 1	Round 2	Points
1	Hermann Anwander	West Germany	81 m	70.5 m	216.0
2	Janez Polda	Yugoslavia	70.5 m	72.5 m	191.0
3	Sepp Schiffner	Austria	73 m	72 m	208.5
4	Siegfried Kostner	Austria	64 m	61 m	172.0
5	Bine Rogelj	Yugoslavia	70.5 m	72.5 m	191.0
6	Zoran Zalokar	Yugoslavia	64 m	58 m	171.0
7	Janez Saksida	Yugoslavia	64 m	58 m	171.0
8	Rudolf Bärtschi	Switzerland	64 m	58 m	171.0
9	Hans Landenhammer	West Germany	64 m	58 m	171.0
10	Rudolf Bärtschi	Switzerland	64 m	58 m	171.0
11	Gottfried Brügger	Switzerland	64 m	58 m	171.0
12	Jože Langus	Yugoslavia	65 m	61.5 m	173.0
13	Régis Rey	France	65 m	61.5 m	173.0
14	Kurt Greller	Austria	64 m	61 m	172.0
15	Gustav Wachter	Austria	64 m	61 m	172.0
16	Erwin Steinegger	Austria	64 m	61 m	172.0
