= Planica 1951 =

Ski jumping competition

Coordinates: 46°28′43″N 13°43′16″E

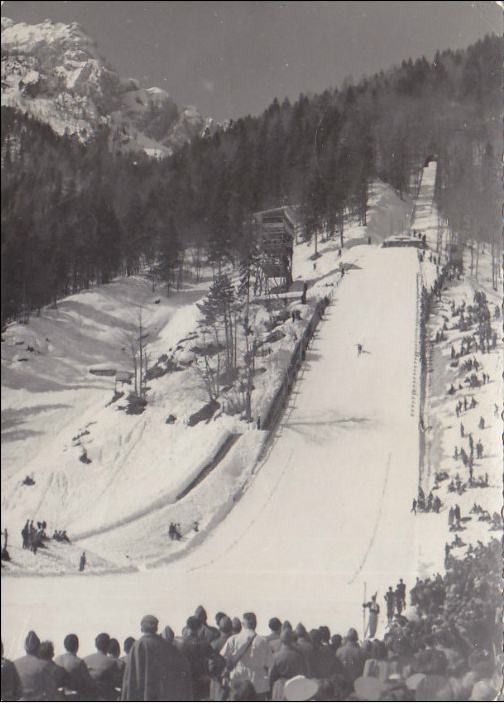
- Host city: Planica, FPR Yugoslavia
- Sport: Ski jumping
- Events: International
- Main venue: Srednja Bloudkova K80

Planica 1951 was an International ski jumping week with international competition on Srednja Bloudkova K80 hill, held on 11 March 1951 in Planica, PR Slovenia, FPR Yugoslavia. Circa 15,000 people has gathered.

== Schedule ==
Date	Event	Rounds	Longest jump of the day	Visitors
6 March 1951	Training 1	4	72.5 metres (238 ft) by Dobrin	N/A
8 March 1951	Training 2	—	74 metres (243 ft) by Janez Polda	N/A
9 March 1951	Training 3	—	75.5 metres (248 ft) by Josef Bradl	N/A
11 March 1951	International event	2	79 metres (259 ft) by Josef Bradl	15,000

== Competitions ==
On 6 March 1951, training on Planica week opening day on K80 normal hill with 13 ski jumpers was on schedule. Each of them made three to four jumps. Dobrin was the longest with 72.5 metres.

On 8 March 1951, training on K80 normal hill with 18 Yugoslavians, 2 Austrians and 2 Swiss was on schedule. Janez Polda was the longest with 74 metres.

On 9 March 1951, training on K80 normal hill with 14 Yugoslavians and 10 Austrians was on schedule. Austrian Josef Bradl was the longest with 75.5 metres.

On 11 March 1951, an international competition with 23 competititors from Yugoslavia, Austria and Switzerland on K80 normal hill was on schedule. Josef Bradl won the event with 79 and 73.5 metres.

=== Training 1 ===
6 March 1951 – Four rounds – incomplete — longest jump

Bib	Name	Country	Longest
N/A	Dobrin	Yugoslavia	72.5 m
N/A	Jože Zidar	Yugoslavia	70 m
N/A	Jože Zalokar	Yugoslavia	69 m
N/A	Albin Adlešič	Yugoslavia	68 m
N/A	Odon Slabe	Yugoslavia	64 m
N/A	Slavko Avsenik	Yugoslavia	63 m
N/A	Rudi Paškulin	Yugoslavia	62 m

=== Training 2 ===
8 March 1951 – the longest jump

Bib	Name	Country	Longest
1	Jože Javornik	Yugoslavia	51 m
2	Jože Langus	Yugoslavia	65 m
3	Slavko Avsenik	Yugoslavia	53.5 m
4	Jože Zidar	Yugoslavia	68 m
5	Fritz Tschannen	Switzerland	72 m
6	Janez Polda	Yugoslavia	74 m
7	Dobrin	Yugoslavia	66.5 m
8	Jože Zalokar	Yugoslavia	68 m
9	Albin Adlešič	Yugoslavia	65 m
10	Rudi Paškulin	Yugoslavia	59 m
11	Janez Kavar	Yugoslavia	59 m
12	Franta Dvoržak	Yugoslavia	54.5 m
13	Jože Jaševec	Yugoslavia	57.5 m
14	Razboršek	Yugoslavia	61.5 m
15	Bildstein	Austria	62 m
16	Helmut Hadwiger	Austria	61 m
17	Janko Mežik	Yugoslavia	66 m
18	Odon Slabe	Yugoslavia	59.5 m
19	Franc Legat	Yugoslavia	57 m
20	Križaj	Yugoslavia	44 m
21	Stane Stanonik	Yugoslavia	59 m
22	N/A	Switzerland	N/A

=== Training 3 ===
9 March 1951 – the longest jump

Bib	Name	Country	Longest
N/A	Odon Slabe	Yugoslavia	61 m
N/A	Jože Jaševec	Yugoslavia	60 m
N/A	Jože Zidar	Yugoslavia	73.5 m
N/A	Slavko Avsenik	Yugoslavia	64 m
N/A	Janez Polda	Yugoslavia	m
N/A	Rudi Paškulin	Yugoslavia	60.5 m
N/A	Jože Langus	Yugoslavia	66.5 m
N/A	Albin Adlešič	Yugoslavia	70.5 m
N/A	Jože Zalokar	Yugoslavia	70 m
N/A	Stane Stanonik	Yugoslavia	60 m
N/A	Janko Mežik	Yugoslavia	69 m
N/A	Dobrin	Yugoslavia	72 m
N/A	Janez Gorišek	Yugoslavia	63 m
N/A	Gabriel	Austria	59 m
N/A	Janez Polda	Yugoslavia	73 m
N/A	Franc Legat	Yugoslavia	60.5 m
N/A	Josef Bradl	Austria	75.5 m
N/A	Bildstein	Austria	67 m
N/A	Edder	Austria	74 m
N/A	Otto Leodolter	Austria	71.5 m
N/A	Helmut Hadwiger	Austria	68 m
N/A	Sepp Schiffner	Austria	65.5 m
N/A	Helmuth Finding	Austria	62.5 m
N/A	Alwin Plank	Austria	67 m

Fall or touch!

== International competition ==
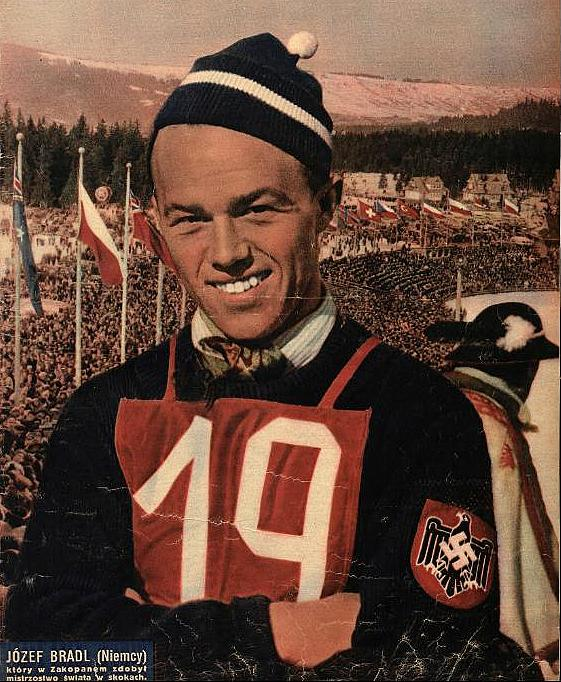
Josef Bradl won the Planica event for the third time

11 March 1951 — Two rounds — official results

Rank	Name	Country	Round 1	Round 2	Points
1	Josef Bradl	Austria	79 m	73.5 m	212.5
2	Janez Polda	Yugoslavia	75.5 m	73.5 m	206.0
3	Alwin Plank	Austria	69 m	72 m	198.5
4	Helmuth Finding	Austria	74 m	71.5 m	185.5
5	Jože Langus	Yugoslavia	67 m	66.5 m	181.5
6	Dobrin	Yugoslavia	68.5 m	70 m	179.0
7	Albin Adlešič	Yugoslavia	66 m	68 m	179.0
8	Fritz Tschannen	Switzerland	73 m	72 m p	178.0
9	Jože Zidar	Yugoslavia	68 m	69 m	177.0
Not available; results from 10 to 23rd place
