= Planica 1947 =

Coordinates: 46°28′43″N 13°43′16″E

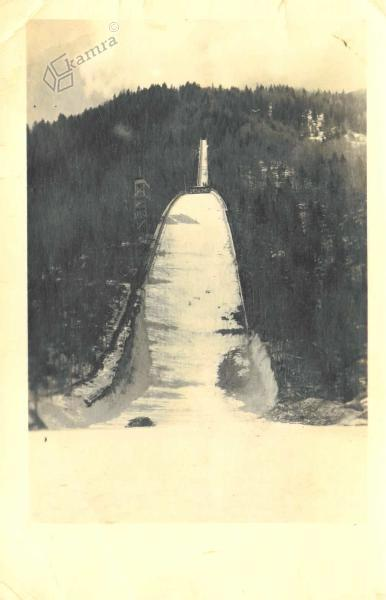
- Host city: Planica, FPR Yugoslavia
- Sport: Ski flying
- Events: Ski Flying Study Week
- Main venue: Bloudkova velikanka K120

Planica 1947 was a ski flying week, allowed only in study purposes, competition held on 24 March 1947 in Planica, PR Slovenia, FPR Yugoslavia. This was the first post WWII competition with total over 25,000 people.

== Schedule ==
Date	Event	Rounds	Longest jump of the day	Visitors
17 March 1947	Training 1	3	94 metres (308 ft) by Rudi Finžgar	N/A
18 March 1947	Training 2	4; 4	91 metres (299 ft) by Rudi Finžgar (morning); 109 metres (358 ft) by Rudi Finžgar (afternoon)	N/A
19 March 1947	Training 3	—	canceled due to heavy rain in the morning	—
20 March 1947	Training 3	— 1	canceled; wet snow problems (morning); 90 metres (295 ft) by Fritz Tschannen (afternoon)	N/A
21 March 1947	Training 4	2	95 metres (312 ft) by Janko Mežik	N/A
22 March 1947	Training 5	2	102 metres (335 ft) by Rudi Finžgar	N/A
23 March 1947	Competition	—	canceled;heavy rain, rescheduled on 24 March	15,000
24 March 1947	Competition	2	89 metres (292 ft) by Rudi Finžgar	N/A

== Competition ==
On 17 March 1947, the first training of ski flying study week was on schedule at 11 AM with three rounds. The longest distance was set by Rudi Finžgar at 94 metres.

On 18 March 1947, the second training of ski flying study week was on schedule with four rounds at the 10 AM morning event and four rounds at the 15:15 PM afternoon event. Both times Rudi Finžgar was the longest with 91 and 109 metres.

On 19 March 1947, training of ski flying study week was on schedule. But it was canceled, no jumps at large hill that day due to heavy rain in the morning. Hill was useless. They all moved to near Hotel Ilirija where Finžgar was telling stories.

On 20 March 1947, the third training day of ski flying study week was on schedule. Morning event was canceled due to wet snow, late afternoon event was ready at 16 PM with thirteen jumps. The longest was Fritz Tschannen at 90 metres.

On 21 March 1947, the fourth training of ski flying study week was on schedule in three rounds. It started at 10 AM with the longest jump of Janko Mežik at 95 metres. Today were totally different weather conditions than yesterday, sunny and frozen snow.

On 22 March 1947, the last training of ski flying study week was on schedule in two rounds. With more visitors each Rudi Finžgar was the longest again with 102 metres. Today was the day with full preparations for tomorrow's main competition.

On 23 March 1947, the main competition was on scheduled, but canceled due to heavy rain. 15,000 disappointed and angry people that gathered around the hill had to go home. Competition was rescheduled on Monday, at the next day.

On 24 March 1947, rescheduled competition from Sunday, this time a lot smaller crowd was held. Hill was ready at 9 AM and Rudi Finžgar who the competition in a battle for the best jump of the day.

=== Training 1 ===
11:00 AM — 17 March 1947 — Three rounds — chronological order

Bib	Name	Country	Round 1	Round 2	Round 3
1	Fritz Tschannen	Switzerland	65 m	70 m	86 m
2	Charles Blum	Switzerland	65 m	80 m	—
3	Georg Keller	Switzerland	61 m	69 m	70 m
4	Rudi Finžgar	Yugoslavia	78 m	91 m	94 m
5	Janko Mežik	Yugoslavia	75 m	81 m	82 m
6	Karel Klančnik	Yugoslavia	58 m	73 m	72 m
7	Ivo Javornik	Yugoslavia	65 m	72 m	76 m
8	Lojze Razinger	Yugoslavia	68 m	78 m	77 m
9	Stane Kordež	Yugoslavia	61 m	71 m	79 m
10	Slavko Šušteršič	Yugoslavia	67 m	—	—
11	Janez Rožič	Yugoslavia	64 m	77 m	82 m
12	Janez Polda	Yugoslavia	70 m	77 m	—

=== Training 2 ===
10:00 AM — 18 March 1947 — Four rounds — chronological order

Bib	Name	Country	Round 1	Round 2	Round 3	Round 4
1	Charles Blum	Switzerland	70 m	86 m	83 m	87 m
2	Georg Keller	Switzerland	61 m	80 m	75 m	76 m
3	Fritz Tschannen	Switzerland	65 m	85 m	87 m	89 m
4	Ivo Javornik	Yugoslavia	62 m	72 m	74 m	77 m
5	Karel Klančnik	Yugoslavia	64 m	82 m	81 m	—
6	Rudi Finžgar	Yugoslavia	73 m	88 m	91 m	—
7	Lojze Razinger	Yugoslavia	68 m	83 m	78 m	—
8	Stane Kordež	Yugoslavia	63 m	71 m	74 m	—
9	Janez Rožič	Yugoslavia	69 m	75 m	77 m	—
10	Janez Polda	Yugoslavia	74 m	78 m	—	—
11	Janko Mežik	Yugoslavia	73 m	75 m	—	—
12	Franc Pribošek	Yugoslavia	63 m	70 m	—	—
13	Franta Dvoržak	Yugoslavia	53 m	58 m	—	—
Afternoon jumps, 15:15 PM
1	Charles Blum	Switzerland	77 m	95 m	98 m	—
2	Fritz Tschannen	Switzerland	76 m	93 m	100 m	—
3	Ivo Javornik	Yugoslavia	80 m	—	—	—
4	Rudi Finžgar	Yugoslavia	80 m	96 m	109 m	—

=== Training 3 ===
16:00 AM — 20 March 1947 — One round — chronological order

Bib	Name	Country	Round 1
1	Rudi Finžgar	Yugoslavia	84 m
2	Albin Novšak	Yugoslavia	63 m
3	Janez Rožič	Yugoslavia	72 m
4	Janko Mežik	Yugoslavia	85 m
5	Slavko Šušteršič	Yugoslavia	69 m
6	Franc Pribošek	Yugoslavia	73 m
7	Karel Klančnik	Yugoslavia	84 m
8	Charles Blum	Switzerland	88 m
9	Georg Keller	Switzerland	76 m
10	Fritz Tschannen	Switzerland	90 m
11	Ivo Javornik	Yugoslavia	77 m
12	Janez Polda	Yugoslavia	89 m
13	Stane Kordež	Yugoslavia	76 m

=== Training 4 ===
10:00 AM — 21 March 1947 — Three rounds — chronological order

Bib	Name	Country	Round 1	Round 2	Round 3
1	Rudi Finžgar	Yugoslavia	82 m	90 m	91 m
2	Charles Blum	Switzerland	81 m	81 m	85 m
3	Georg Keller	Switzerland	68 m	78 m	76 m
4	Fritz Tschannen	Switzerland	85 m	80 m	93 m
5	Franc Pribošek	Yugoslavia	76 m	84 m	—
6	Karel Klančnik	Yugoslavia	88 m	85 m	84 m
7	Lojze Razinger	Yugoslavia	76 m	75 m	76 m
8	Janez Rožič	Yugoslavia	77 m	73 m	—
9	Janko Mežik	Yugoslavia	78 m	95 m	—
10	Albin Novšak	Yugoslavia	75 m	—	—
11	Slavko Šušteršič	Yugoslavia	77 m	—	—
12	Janez Polda	Yugoslavia	75 m	86 m	—
13	Bine Rogelj	Yugoslavia	53 m	—	—

=== Training 5 ===
8:30 AM — 22 March 1947 — Two rounds — chronological order

Bib	Name	Country	Round 1	Round 2
1	Janko Mežik	Yugoslavia	93 m	99 m
2	Charles Blum	Switzerland	96 m	101 m
3	Fritz Tschannen	Switzerland	100 m	101 m
4	Georg Keller	Switzerland	85 m	90 m
5	Rudi Finžgar	Yugoslavia	94 m	102 m
6	Lojze Razinger	Yugoslavia	84 m	86 m
7	Franc Pribošek	Yugoslavia	88 m	—
8	Janez Polda	Yugoslavia	100 m	—

Yugoslavian national record!
Fall or touch!

== Official results ==
=== Ski Flying Study competition ===
24 March 1947 — 9:00 AM — Two rounds — ranking incomplete — points N/A

Rank	Bib	Name	Country	Round 1	Round 2
1	1	Rudi Finžgar	Yugoslavia	86 m	89 m
2	3	Charles Blum	Switzerland	81 m	N/A
3	4	Fritz Tschannen	Switzerland	92 m	N/A
N/A	2	Stane Kordež	Yugoslavia	72 m	N/A
N/A	5	Georg Keller	Switzerland	63 m	N/A
N/A	6	Lojze Razinger	Yugoslavia	69 m	N/A
N/A	7	Franc Pribošek	Yugoslavia	87 m	N/A
N/A	8	Janko Mežik	Yugoslavia	87 m	95 m
N/A	9	Karel Klančnik	Yugoslavia	84 m	N/A
N/A	10	Ivo Javornik	Yugoslavia	68 m	N/A
