= Srednja Bloudkova =

Ski jumping venue in Planica, Slovenia

Coordinates: 46°28′40.05″N 13°43′19.52″E

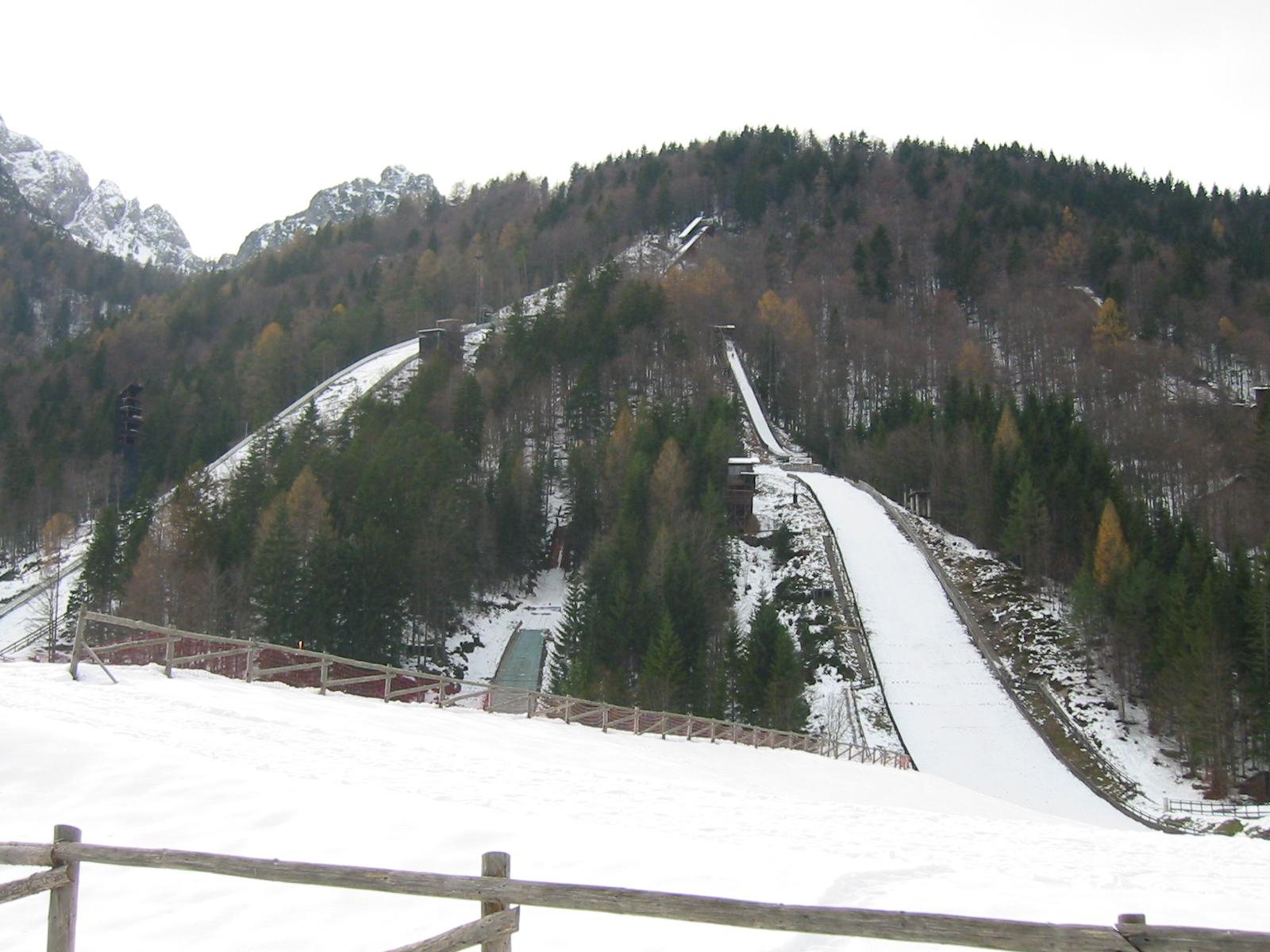
- on right; replaced with HS 62, 80
- Constructor: Stanko Bloudek
- Location: Planica, Slovenia
- Opened: 27 March 1949
- Renovated: 1989
- Closed: 2007
- Demolished: 2012

Size
- K–point: 90 m
- Hill size: 100 m
- Hill record: 110 m (361 ft) (Slovenia) Bine Zupan (13 Mar 2004)

Srednja Bloudkova (English: Bloudek's normal hill) was a ski jumping K90 hill located in Planica, Slovenia, that existed between 1949 and 2012.

== History ==
The hill was opened in 1949 and constructed by Slovenian engineer Stanko Bloudek. The hill has a perfect location and the first original inrun was made of thin steel stick construction. His main assistant at the construction of this hill was Stano Pelan, Slovenian pilot, constructor, bank officer, working supervisor, credited as Planica expert, FIS judge of ski jumping and technical judge delegate. This hill is also known under his name.

The winner of a first international opening competition on this hill on 27 March 1949 was Janez Polda. The winner of the last international competition on March 28, 1971, was East German Hans-Georg Aschenbach.

The winner of the first World Cup competition on 21 March 1980 was Austrian Hans Millonig.

Constructors of the present hill are brothers Vlado and Janez Gorišek. They reconstructed the hill in 1989. In hill axis there was a wooden sculpture of a ski jumper.

The last World Cup event was on 11 December 1994 with Austrian winner Andreas Goldberger. In total there were 11 individual World Cup competitions. The last official ski jumping event on this hill was held on the 2007 FIS Nordic Junior World Ski Championships replacing Tarvisio, a venue dealing with a lack of snow. Those were also the last ski jumps ever at this hill.

As a part of Planica Nordic Centre renovation, the hill was completely demolished in late 2012. It stands just a few meters away from Stano Pelan Hill and right next to the Bloudkova velikanka. After they demolished Stano Pelan Hill, they built two completely new medium ski jumping hills at the same place, which are used for training. They are HS 62 and HS 80 size. Those two smaller hills opened in December 2013.

== Competitions ==
=== Ski jumping ===
Year	Date	Event	Winner	Second	Third
1949	20 March	OP	(Sweden) Evert Karlsson	(Socialist Federal Republic of Yugoslavia) Janez Polda	(Sweden) Karl Holmström
1949	27 March	INT	(Socialist Federal Republic of Yugoslavia) Janez Polda	(Finland) Lasse Johansson	(Finland) Rafael Viljamaa
1950	12 March	INT1	(Norway) Thorleif Schjelderup	(Norway) Sverre Kronvold	(Socialist Federal Republic of Yugoslavia) Janez Polda
1950	19 March	INT2	(Norway) Sverre Stenersen	(Norway) Hakonsen	(Norway) Sverre Kronvold
1951	11 March	INT	(Austria) Sepp Bradl	(Socialist Federal Republic of Yugoslavia) Janez Polda	(Austria) Alwin Plank
1952	23 March	INT	(United States) Keith Wegeman	(Austria) Sepp Bradl	(Austria) Alois Leodolter
1953	8 March	INT	(West Germany) Herm Anwander	(Socialist Federal Republic of Yugoslavia) Janez Polda	(Austria) Sepp Schiffner
1965	7 March	JPM.1	(East Germany) Dieter Mueller	(West Germany) Helmut Wegscheider	(East Germany) Dieter Bokeloh
1967	26 March	JPM.2	(Austria) Reinhold Bachler	(East Germany) Horst Queck	(East Germany) Peter Lesser
1970	22 March	JPM.3	(Soviet Union) Vladimir Smirnov	(Soviet Union) Aleksandr Ivannikov	(Austria) Reinhold Bachler
1971	28 March	JPM.5	(East Germany) Hans-Georg Aschenbach	(Switzerland) Walter Steiner	(Socialist Federal Republic of Yugoslavia) Peter Štefančič
1980	21 March	WC	(Austria) Hans Millonig	(Austria) Armin Kogler	(Socialist Federal Republic of Yugoslavia) Primož Ulaga
1981	21 March	WC	(Finland) Jari Puikkonen	(Canada) Horst Bulau	(East Germany) Axel Zitzmann
1982	27 March	WC	(Norway) Ole Bremseth	(Norway) Per Bergerud	(Italy) Massimo Rigoni
1983	26 March	WC	(Finland) Matti Nykänen	(Socialist Federal Republic of Yugoslavia) Primož Ulaga	(Norway) Olav Hansson
1984	24 March	WC	(East Germany) Jens Weißflog	(United States) Mike Holland	(Poland) Janusz Malik
1986	22 March	WC	(Finland) Matti Nykänen	(Austria) Andreas Felder	(Austria) Franz Neuländtner
1988	27 March	WC	(Socialist Federal Republic of Yugoslavia) Primož Ulaga	(Czechoslovakia) Pavel Ploc	(Austria) Ernst Vettori
1989	25 March	WC	(East Germany) Jens Weißflog	(Austria) Andreas Felder	(Finland) Ari-Pekka Nikkola
1993	11 December	WC	(Norway) Espen Bredesen	(Japan) Takanobu Okabe	(Austria) Andreas Goldberger
1994	10 December	WC	(Japan) Kazuyoshi Funaki	(Austria) Andreas Goldberger	(Finland) Janne Ahonen
1994	11 December	WC	(Austria) Andreas Goldberger	(Finland) Mika Laitinen	(Norway) Lasse Ottesen

=== Nordic combined ===
Year	Date	Event	Winner	Second	Third
1984	15 December	WC; K92 / 15 km	(Norway) Geir Andersen	(West Germany) Hubert Schwarz	(Norway) Hallstein Bøgseth

== Hill record ==
=== Men ===
Date		Distance
14 February 1949	(Socialist Federal Republic of Yugoslavia) Franc Pribošek	60 metres (197 ft)
14 February 1949	(Socialist Federal Republic of Yugoslavia) Franc Pribošek	67 metres (220 ft)
14 February 1949	(Socialist Federal Republic of Yugoslavia) Franc Pribošek	68 metres (223 ft)
14 February 1949	(Socialist Federal Republic of Yugoslavia) Franc Pribošek	71 metres (233 ft)
14 February 1949	(Socialist Federal Republic of Yugoslavia) Franc Pribošek	75 metres (246 ft)
17 February 1949	(Socialist Federal Republic of Yugoslavia) Janez Polda	77 metres (253 ft)
20 February 1949	(Socialist Federal Republic of Yugoslavia) Janez Polda	79 metres (259 ft)
24 March 1949	(Sweden) Evert Karlsson	79 metres (259 ft)
24 March 1949	(Socialist Federal Republic of Yugoslavia) Janez Polda	80.5 metres (264 ft)
27 March 1949	(Sweden) Evert Karlsson	85.5 metres (281 ft)
27 March 1949	(Socialist Federal Republic of Yugoslavia) Janez Polda	86 metres (282 ft)
7 March 1965	(Socialist Federal Republic of Yugoslavia) Marjan Pečar	87 metres (285 ft)
26 March 1967	(East Germany) Horst Queck	91 metres (299 ft)
23 March 1968	(Czechoslovakia) Jiří Raška	92 metres (302 ft)
23 March 1968	(Czechoslovakia) Josef Matouš	93 metres (305 ft)
23 March 1968	(Soviet Union) Gariy Napalkov	93.5 metres (305 ft)
23 March 1968	(Czechoslovakia) Jiří Raška	96 metres (315 ft)
24 March 1984	(East Germany) Jens Weißflog	97 metres (318 ft)
11 March 1993	(Germany) Jens Weißflog	101 metres (331 ft)
11 March 1993	(Japan) Takanobu Okabe	101 metres (331 ft)
11 March 1993	(Norway) Espen Bredesen	101 metres (331 ft)
11 March 1994	(Austria) Andreas Goldberger	102.5 metres (336 ft)
4 March 2000	(Austria) Christian Nagiller	103.5 metres (340 ft)
4 March 2000	(Austria) Lukas Tschuschnig	104 metres (341 ft)
13 March 2004	(Slovenia) Bine Zupan	110 metres (361 ft)

Invalid hill record with Fall.

=== Ladies ===
Date		Distance
2 March 2003	(Norway) Anette Sagen	105.5 metres (346 ft)

== See also ==
- Letalnica bratov Gorišek
- Bloudkova velikanka
- Planica Nordic Centre
