= Planica 1952 =

Coordinates: 46°28′43″N 13°43′16″E

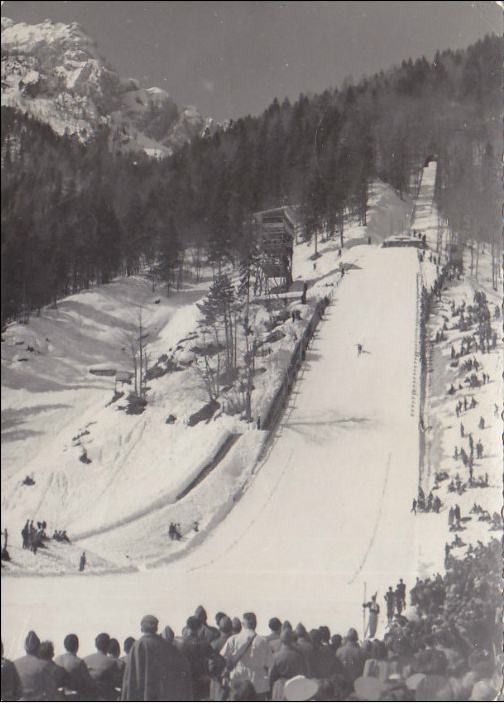
- Host city: Planica, FPR Yugoslavia
- Sport: Ski jumping
- Events: International
- Main venue: Srednja Bloudkova K80

Planica 1952 was an International ski jumping week with international competition on Srednja Bloudkova K80 hill, held on 23 March 1952 in Planica, PR Slovenia, FPR Yugoslavia. 5,000 people has gathered.

== Schedule ==
Date	Event	Rounds	Longest jump of the day	Visitors
21 March 1952	Training 1	N/A	75 metres (246 ft) by Rudi Finžgar	—
22 March 1952	Training 2	5	81.5 metres (267 ft) by Keith Wegeman	—
23 March 1952	International event	2	81 metres (266 ft) by Keith Wegeman	5,000

== Competitions ==
On 21 March 1952, first training was on schedule with 19 competitors on start. The longest jump was set by Rudi Finžgar at 75 metres.

On 22 March 1952, second training was on schedule with 21 competitors on start. The longest jump was set by Keith Wegeman from Hollywood at 81.5 metres.

On 23 March 1952, second international competition, with 25 competitors from Yugoslavia, Austria and United States on K80 normal hill was on schedule. Keith Wegeman won with 81 and 70.5 metres.

=== Training 1 ===
21 March 1952 — Afternoon — incomplete

Bib	Name	Country	Round 1
N/A	Rudi Finžgar	Yugoslavia	75 m
N/A	Karel Klančnik	Yugoslavia	+70 m
N/A	Helmuth Finding	Austria	N/A
N/A	Alwin Plank	Austria	N/A
19 competititors on start in total; 15 N/A

=== Training 2 ===
22 March 1952 – Four rounds – incomplete — longest jump

Bib	Name	Country	Round 1	Round 2	Round 3	Round 4	Round 5
N/A	Keith Wegeman	United States	77 m	79.5 m	81.5 m	79.5 m	—
N/A	Josef Bradl	Austria	78 m	80 m	75 m	79 m	77 m
N/A	Otto Leodolter	Austria	75 m	73.5 m	77 m	77 m	79 m
N/A	Rudi Finžgar	Yugoslavia	71 m	72.5 m	73 m	74.5 m	73 m
N/A	Janez Polda	Yugoslavia	70 m	71.5 m	73.5 m	71 m	—
N/A	Karel Klančnik	Yugoslavia	72 m	73 m	71 m	—	—
N/A	Helmuth Findling	Austria	70 m	71 m	72 m	—	—
N/A	Hans Greiler	Austria	70 m	72 m	—	—	—
N/A	Albin Adlešič	Yugoslavia	67 m	71 m	—	—	—
N/A	Zoran Zalokar	Yugoslavia	70 m	63 m	—	—	—
N/A	Kienzl	Austria	71.5 m	—	—	—	—
N/A	Siegfried Kostner	Austria	71 m	—	—	—	—
21 competitors on start in total; 9 places not available

== International competition ==
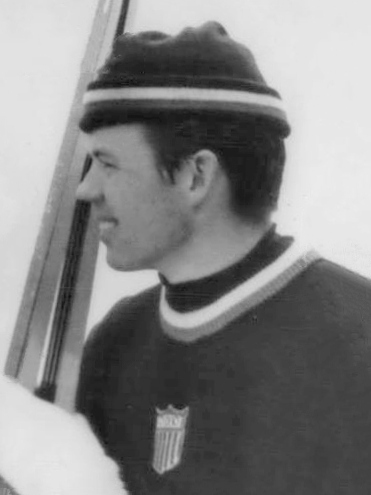
Keith R. Wegeman is so far the only American winner in the history of Planica

23 March 1952 — 10:30 AM — Two rounds — official results

Rank	Bib	Name	Country	Round 1	Round 2	Points
1	10	Keith Wegeman	United States	81 m	70.5 m	216.0
2	N/A	Josef Bradl	Austria	73 m	72 m	208.5
3	N/A	Otto Leodolter	Austria	73 m	67 m	201.0
4	6	Karel Klančnik	Yugoslavia	66 m	68 m	192.5
5	N/A	Janez Polda	Yugoslavia	70.5 m	72.5 m	191.0
6	N/A	Rudi Finžgar	Yugoslavia	72 m	69.5 m	189.5
7	N/A	Ferdi Kerber	Austria	70.5 m	63 m	186.5
8	N/A	Jože Langus	Yugoslavia	65 m	61.5 m	173.0
9	N/A	Siegfried Kostner	Austria	64 m	61 m	172.0
10	N/A	Helmuth Finding	Austria	63 m	61.5 m	172.0
11	N/A	Zoran Zalokar	Yugoslavia	64 m	58 m	171.0
12	1	Jože Zidar	Yugoslavia	61.5 m	57.5 m	166.0
13	N/A	Stane Stanonik	Yugoslavia	60 m	65 m	165.0
14	N/A	Alwin Plank	Austria	59 m	58.5 m	161.0
15	N/A	Albin Adlešič	Yugoslavia	56 m	62.5 m	160.0
N/A	N/A	Ivo Razboršek	Yugoslavia	N/A	N/A	N/A
N/A	N/A	Jože Jaševec	Yugoslavia	N/A	N/A	N/A
Not available; results from 16 to 25th place
