= Ski jumping at the 1948 Winter Olympics =

Ski jumping at the V Olympic Winter Games
- Venue: Olympiaschanze
- Dates: 7 February 1948
- Competitors: 49 from 14 nations
- Winning Score: 227.0

Medalists
1st place, gold medalist(s)		Petter Hugsted	Norway
2nd place, silver medalist(s)		Birger Ruud	Norway
3rd place, bronze medalist(s)		Thorleif Schjelderup	Norway

Ski jumping at the 1948 Winter Olympics consisted of one event held on 7 February. The competition took place at Olympiaschanze with a K-Point of 68m.

== Medal summary ==
=== Medal table ===
Rank	Nation	Gold	Silver	Bronze	Total
1	Norway	1	1	1	3
Totals (1 entries)		1	1	1	3

Norway swept all three medals for the second time, having previously done so in 1932.

=== Events ===
Event	Gold		Silver		Bronze	
Individual	Petter Hugsted; Norway	228.1	Birger Ruud; Norway	226.6	Thorleif Schjelderup; Norway	225.1

== Results ==
Each athlete took two jumps, and were ranked on the total points scored.

Rank	Athlete	Country	Total
1st place, gold medalist(s)	Petter Hugsted	Norway	228.1
2nd place, silver medalist(s)	Birger Ruud	Norway	226.6
3rd place, bronze medalist(s)	Thorleif Schjelderup	Norway	225.1
4	Matti Pietikäinen	Finland	224.6
5	Gordy Wren	United States	222.8
6	Leo Laakso	Finland	221.7
7	Asbjørn Ruud	Norway	220.2
8	Aatto Pietikäinen	Finland	216.4
9	Fritz Tschannen	Switzerland	214.8
10	Hans Zurbriggen	Switzerland	214.0
11	Evert Karlsson	Sweden	212.2
12	Sverre Fredheim	United States	210.0
13	Willy Klopfenstein	Switzerland	209.3
14	Vilhelm Hellman	Sweden	208.1
15	Joe Perrault	United States	207.0
16	Miloslav Bělonožník	Czechoslovakia	203.9
17	Andreas Däscher	Switzerland	203.8
18	Bruno Da Col	Italy	201.2
19	Hubert Hammerschmied	Austria	199.8
20	Zdeněk Remsa	Czechoslovakia	198.6
21	Jaroslav Lukeš	Czechoslovakia	198.5
22	Arsène Lucchini	France	198.0
23	Karel Klančnik	Yugoslavia	197.2
24	Gregor Höll	Austria	195.8
25	James Couttet	France	194.3
26	Régis Charlet	France	193.7
27	Stanisław Marusarz	Poland	192.8
28	Toni Wieser	Austria	192.1
29	Josef Císař	Czechoslovakia	189.4
30	Józef Daniel Krzeptowski	Poland	188.9
31	Jean Monnier	France	188.5
32	Franc Pribošek	Yugoslavia	187.4
33	Jan Kula	Poland	184.5
34	Ferenc Hemrik	Hungary	183.3
35	Helmut Hadwiger	Austria	181.4
36	Jan Gąsienica Ciaptak	Poland	180.8
37	Jónas Ásgeirsson	Iceland	179.8
38	Aldo Trivella	Italy	176.6
39	Bill Irwin	Canada	175.1
40	Nils Lundh	Sweden	152.7
41	Janez Polda	Yugoslavia	145.2
42	Walter Bietila	United States	142.9
43	Janko Mežik	Yugoslavia	136.9
44	Tom Mobraaten	Canada	135.9
45	Igino Rizzi	Italy	131.7
46	Laurent Bernier	Canada	129.3
-	Erkki Rajala	Finland	DNF
-	Erik Lindström	Sweden	DNF
-	Pál Ványa	Hungary	DNF

== Participating NOCs ==
Fourteen nations participated in ski jumping at the Cortina Games. France and Iceland made the Olympic ski jumping debuts.

- Austria (4)
- Canada (3)
- Finland (4)
- France (4)
- Hungary (2)
- Iceland (1)
- Italy (3)
- Norway (4)
- Poland (4)
- Switzerland (4)
- Sweden (4)
- Czechoslovakia (4)
- United States (4)
- Yugoslavia (4)
