= IF Friska Viljor =

Sports club in Örnsköldsvik, Sweden

- Full name: Idrottsföreningen Friska Viljor
- Sport: ski jumping, Nordic combined soccer (earlier)
- Founded: 1905
- Based in: Örnsköldsvik, Sweden

Idrottsföreningen Friska Viljor is a Swedish ski jumping and Nordic combined club from Örnsköldsvik, Västernorrland County.

It formerly offered more sports. A football club named Friska Viljor FC was separated from IF Friska Viljor in February 1994. The alpine skiing section was also separated from IF Friska Viljor.

The brothers Evert and Kåre Karlsson participated together at the 1950 World Ski Championships, and Evert was a 1948 Olympian. Other Olympians are Sven-Olof Lundgren (1928), Axel Östrand (1936), Erik Lindström (1948), Nils Lundh (1948), Bengt Eriksson (1956, 1960; silver medalist), Kjell Sjöberg (1960, 1964, 1968), Bror Östman (1952, 1956), Rolf Strandberg (1960), Mats Östman (1968), Ulf Norberg (1968), Anders Lundqvist (1972), Magnus Westman (1992, 1994), Fredrik Johansson (1994), Johan Rasmussen (1994). and Frida Westman (2022). In recent years several club members have participated in the Ski jumping World Cup, including Kristoffer Jaafs, Carl Nordin, Isak Grimholm, and Jakob Grimholm.

Their hill is Paradiskullen, which is one of Scandinavia's training facilities for ski jumping.
