= Planica 1965 =

Coordinates: 46°28′43″N 13°43′16″E

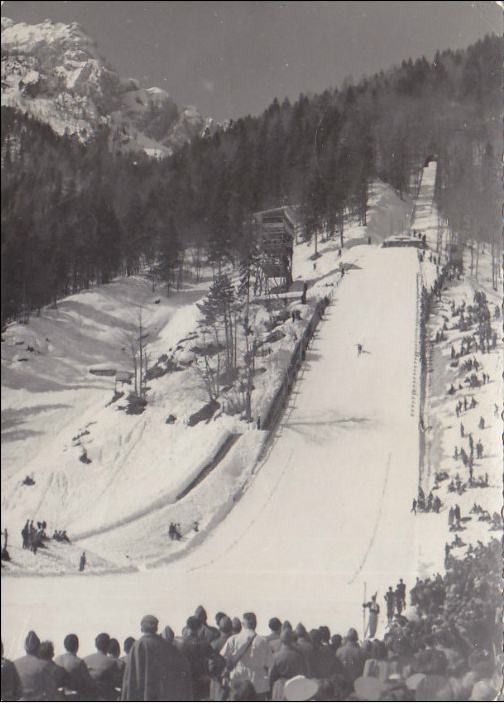
- Host city: Planica, FPR Yugoslavia
- Sport: Ski jumping
- Events: Janez Polda Memorial I
- Main venue: Srednja Bloudkova K90

Planica 1966 was Janez Polda Memorial I international ski jumping competition on Srednja Bloudkova K90 hill, held on 7 March 1965 in Planica, PR Slovenia, FPR Yugoslavia. 5,000 people has gathered.

== Schedule ==
Date	Event	Rounds	Longest jump of the day	Visitors
6 March 1965	Official training	N/A	heavy snowfall	—
7 March 1965	Janez Polda Memorial I	2	86 metres (397 ft) by Dieter Bokeloh	5,000

== Competitions ==
On 6 March 1965, official training was on schedule at K90, however it was canceled, due to heavy snow in last couple of days, hill wasn't ready.

On 7 March 1965, official international competition, first Janez Polda Memorial was on schedule in front of 5,000 people. There were 35 competitors from 8 countries: Yugoslavia, East Germany, West Germany, Italy, Bolgaria, Hungary, Soviet Union and Austria. Dieter Müller won the event with 83 and 85 metres.

== Official results ==
=== Janez Polda Memorial I ===
7 March 1965 – Srednja Bloudkova K90 – Two rounds

Rank	Name	Country	Round 1	Round 2	Points
1	Dieter Müller	East Germany	83 m	85 m	218.5
2	Helmut Recknagel	East Germany	81 m	83 m	209.9
3	Dieter Bokeloh	East Germany	79 m	86 m	208.0
4	Albino Bazzana	Italy	86 m	80 m	207.0
5	Peter Müller	Austria	80 m	82 m	206.9
6	Marjan Pečar	Yugoslavia	77 m	87 m	205.3
7	Miro Oman	Yugoslavia	77 m	80 m	200.2
8	Peter Eržen	Yugoslavia	85 m	69 m	192.5
9	Wolfgang Schiller	West Germany	77 m	79 m	190.7
10	Kurt Wegeler	East Germany	77 m	77 m	189.6
11	Ludvik Zajc	Yugoslavia	80 m	76 m	189.1
12	Alfred Berhard	West Germany	77 m	79 m	186.5
13	Viktor Korolev	Soviet Union	72 m	77 m	184.6
14	Boris Sidoranko	Soviet Union	72 m	78 m	184.4
15	Stanko Smolej	Yugoslavia	72 m	77 m	184.1
16	Albert Heim	Austria	N/A	N/A	181.9
17	Mihály Gellér	Hungary	N/A	N/A	179.6
18	Agostino De Zordo	Italy	N/A	N/A	177.7
19	Alois Haberstock	West Germany	N/A	N/A	175.3
20	László Gellér	Hungary	N/A	N/A	171.4
21	Peter Štefančič	Yugoslavia	N/A	N/A	N/A
22	Janez Jurman	Yugoslavia	N/A	N/A	170.4
23	László Csávás	Hungary	N/A	N/A	169.8
24	Manfred Wallner	Austria	N/A	N/A	168.6
27	Bine Rogelj	Yugoslavia	N/A	N/A	152.0
29	Tomaž Križaj	Yugoslavia	N/A	N/A	151.2
30	Marjan Mesec	Yugoslavia	N/A	N/A	143.2
31	Andrej Mulej	Yugoslavia	N/A	N/A	135.0
25	not available				
26	not available				
28	not available				
32	not available				
33	not available				
34	not available				
35	not available				
