= Vidar Lindboe-Hansen =

Norwegian ski jumper and mining engineer

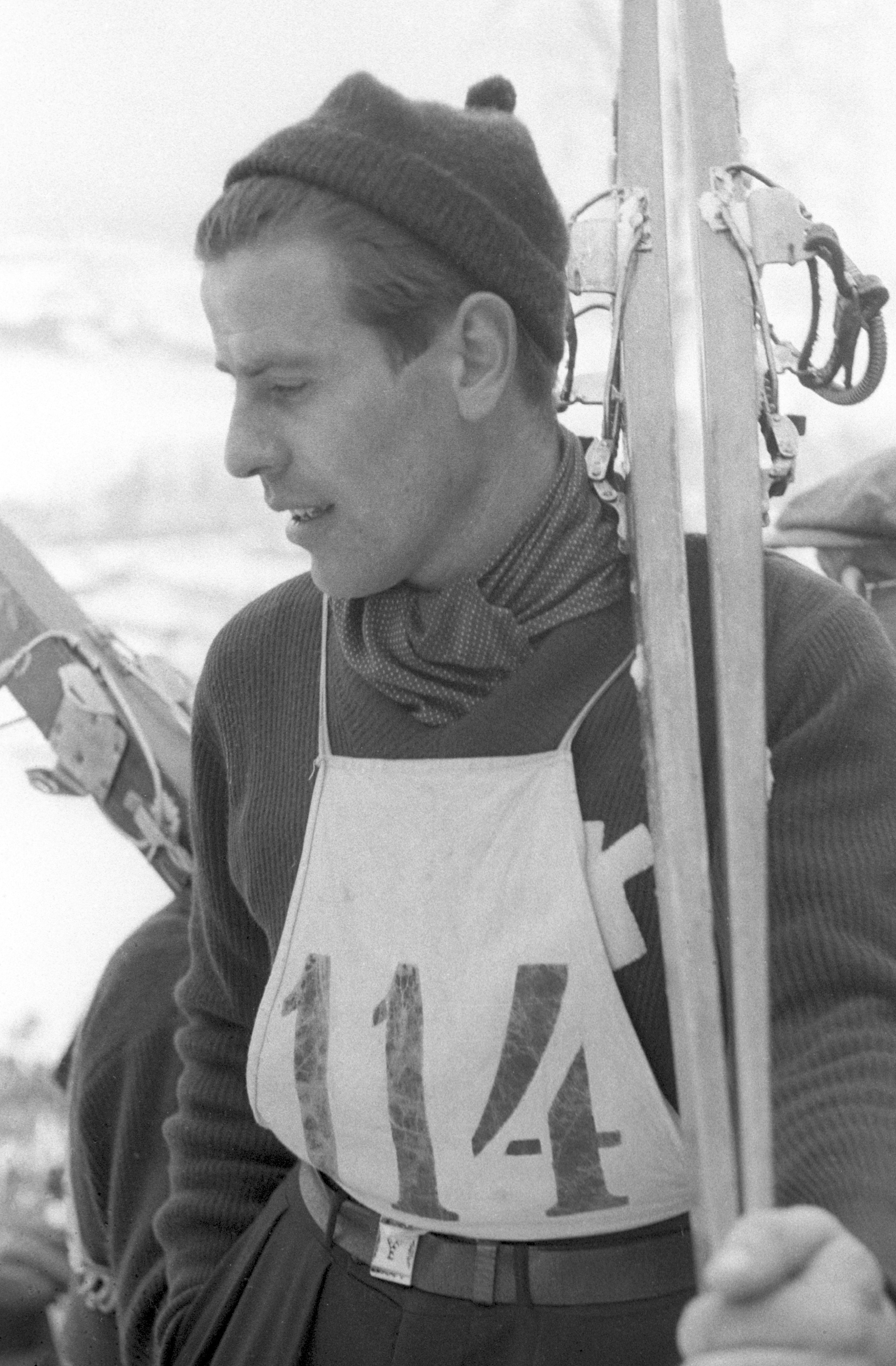

Personal information
- Born: 6 May 1920 Kongsberg, Norway
- Died: 21 March 1976 (aged 55) Sydvaranger, Norway

Sport
- Sport: Ski jumping

Vidar Lindboe-Hansen (6 May 1920 – 21 March 1976) was a Norwegian ski jumper and mining engineer.

He was born in Kongsberg, and studied at the Norwegian Institute of Technology before settling in Løkken Verk as a mining engineer. Here he joined the local sports club Løkken IF.

He finished tenth at the 1950 World Ski Championships. Three other Løkken IF members (former) participated here; Evert Karlsson, Kåre Karlsson and Arthur E. Tokle. Lindboe-Hansen also participated in the Holmenkollen ski festival in 1940, 1947, 1948 and 1949. His career was interrupted by the German occupation of Norway from 1940 to 1945, then in December 1950 he was badly injured when a mine explosion came out of control.

In 1963 he went from Løkken Verk to Sydvaranger in Kirkenes.
