= Kåre Karlsson =

Swedish ski jumper (1924–2024)

Kåre Ingemar Karlsson (28 January 1924 – 21 June 2024) was a Swedish ski jumper.

== Biography ==
Karlsson was born in Løkken Verk in Norway, and grew up there with his ski jumper brothers Arthur and Evert Karlsson. They represented the sports club Løkken IF. Kåre Karlsson moved to Örnsköldsvik in his father's home country Sweden in 1944, and joined the club IF Friska Viljor.

He finished 21st at the 1950 World Ski Championships. Three other Løkken IF members (current or former) participated here; Evert Karlsson, Arthur E. Tokle, and Vidar Lindboe-Hansen. At the Swedish Championships, Kåre Karlsson finished sixth in 1945, ninth in 1946, seventh in 1948, second in 1949, and eighth in 1953.

Karlsson turned 100 in January 2024, and died on 21 June.
