= Norway Ski Club =

Ski club in New York, United States

Norway Ski Club is a ski club consisting of members mainly from the New York metropolitan area. The club owns land and a building in the town of Shandaken, New York not far from the hamlet of Phoenicia. The club traces its roots back to the Norwegian immigrants of New York City who brought the history and practice of skiing to North America from its traditional home in Scandinavia.

== Torger Tokle ==
One famous member of Norway Ski Club, Torger Tokle, was a champion ski jumper who emigrated to New York in 1939. While traveling the country for jumping competitions, Torger wore the colors of the ski club and the logo on his competitive uniform. Torger won 42 of his 48 jumping competitions. His brothers included noted skiers, Kyrre Tokle and Arthur E. Tokle.

Torger Tokle joined the U.S. Army in October, 1942, and was eventually placed in the Ski Troops on the 86th Mountain Regiment. In the spring of 1945 the 86th took part in the invasion of Italy, and in early March was assigned the mission of reducing a German stronghold at Monte Terracia in the Apennines. Leading his men into action on March 3, Torger was hit and died on the battlefield.

After his death during World War II, Norway Ski Club created the Torger Tokle Memorial Trophy, housed at the National Ski Museum. In 1959, Tokle was elected to the National Ski Hall of Fame at the National Ski Museum at Ishpeming, Michigan.
