= Willy Klopfenstein =

Swiss ski jumper

Personal information
- Nationality: Swiss
- Born: 11 January 1921; Wängi, Switzerland
- Died: 21 June 2002 (aged 81); Brienz, Switzerland

Sport
- Sport: Ski jumping

Willy Klopfenstein (11 January 1921 – 21 June 2002) was a Swiss ski jumper. He competed in the individual event at the 1948 Winter Olympics.
