= Toni Wieser =

Austrian ski jumper

Personal information
- Nationality: Austrian
- Born: 23 January 1921 Bischofshofen, Austria
- Died: 30 January 1993 (aged 72) Schwarzach im Pongau, Austria

Sport
- Sport: Ski jumping

Toni Wieser (23 January 1921 – 30 January 1993) was an Austrian ski jumper. He competed in the individual event at the 1948 Winter Olympics.
