= Løkken IF =

Norwegian sports club

- Full name: Løkken Idrettsforening
- Founded: 21 November 1896
- Ground: Løkken gras, Løkken Verk
- League: none

Løkken Idrettsforening is a Norwegian sports club from Løkken Verk, Sør-Trøndelag. It has sections for association football, speed skating and Nordic skiing.

It was founded on 21 November 1896 as Meldalskogen SL. The name was changed to Løkken IL on 30 March 1898. The name was changed to Løkken IF on 26 July 1947 as two clubs merged with Løkken IL. One club was IF Thor, founded in 1918 and incorporating the short-lived Løkken AIL (1924–1926). IF Thor was a member of the Workers' Confederation of Sports, but later joined the Red Sport federation. When they did that, a new Workers' Confederation of Sports club was founded by the name SK Fjell in 1930. This was the third club to participate in the 1947 merger.

Løkken IL was founded as a Nordic skiing club, and also participated in cycling and speed skating. IF Thor concentrated on football and skiing, but also participated in swimming, track and field, cycling and sport shooting. SK Fjell concentrated on skiing and football, and was also a practitioner of swimming, bandy, boxing and race walking, and in 1945 it added handball for women. SK Fjell and IF Thor played each other in a women's football match in 1939, perhaps the first of its kind in Norway. In addition to these clubs, chess was played at Løkken Verk, by the club Løkken SK.

SK Fjell was the dominant club at the time of the merger, while IF Thor struggled. Skiers included Kåre Vaslag and the five brothers Henry, Torger, Kyrre, Egil and Arthur E. Tokle. Løkken IL members had included the World Championships (1938 and 1939 respectively) participants Rudolf Kojan and John Sagvold. Some of these continued after the Second World War. In the 1950 World Championships Arthur Tokle participated together with Norwegian Vidar Lindboe-Hansen and Swede Kåre Karlsson who together with his brother Evert Karlsson had represented Løkken in their youth.

The best ski jumper in newer times was Kurt Børset. Vidar Løfshus has one World Cup start in skiing. Speed skater Jan Egil Storholt is from Løkken Verk. Stig Berge was an able orienteer while orienteering was practiced for a period in Løkken. The club has dropped several sports from its roster, and only football, skiing and speed skating is left. The men's football team played in the Third Division, the fourth tier of Norwegian football from 1997 to 2002. The club does not currently field a senior team, only some children's teams.

The clubs had good ski jumping hills and good trails for cross-country skiing. On 4 July 1954 Løkken IF opened a decent field for football and track and field. In 1997 the track was demolished, as an artificial turf was paid for by the local corporation, Orkla. The speed skating arena is Granatjønna.
