= Vilhelm Hellman =

Swedish ski jumper

Personal information
- Nationality: Swedish
- Born: 7 December 1922; Örnsköldsvik, Sweden
- Died: 7 November 1991 (aged 68); Stockholm, Sweden

Sport
- Sport: Ski jumping

Vilhelm Alexander Hellman (7 December 1922 – 7 November 1991) was a Swedish ski jumper. He competed in the individual event at the 1948 Winter Olympics.

Hellman represented Djurgårdens IF.
