= Torger Tokle =

Norwegian-American ski jumper

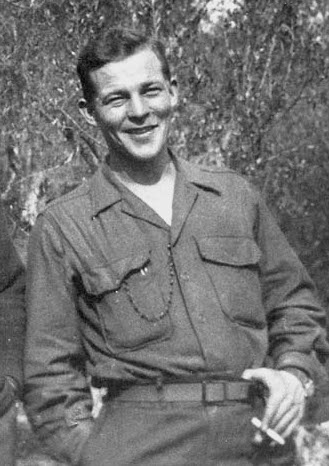
- Sgt. Tokle in 1945

Personal information
- Born: March 7, 1919 Løkken Verk, Norway
- Died: March 3, 1945 (aged 25) Emilia-Romagna, Italy
- Height: 5 ft 6½ in

Sport
- Sport: Ski jumping
- Club: Løkken IF, Norway Ski Club

Torger Tokle (March 7, 1919 – March 3, 1945) was a Norwegian-born American ski jumper and military officer. During his six-year jumping career he won 42 of 48 tournaments and set 24 hill records. He died in action during the battle of Iola di Montese in Italy in 1945. In 1959 he was inducted into the U.S. Ski and Snowboard Hall of Fame.

== Biography ==
Tokle was born in Løkken Verk, a village in Meldal Municipality in Sør-Trøndelag county, Norway. His father was a Norwegian mining official, who raised his 20 children in the sport, and skied himself until he was well past 70. Torger started skiing aged three, and at six was already competitively jumped from forty-meter hills. On January 29, 1939 he moved to the United States and settled in Brooklyn, New York. In 1940, he won every tournament he entered, except for the national title, which was taken by Alf Engen. Tokle never lost to Engen after that, and won the national title the following year.

In October 1942 he enlisted in the US army, serving first in the infantry and then in the 10th Mountain Division, where he joined an assortment of the finest skiers in North America. Their numbers included Walter Prager, Peter Gabriel, Friedl Pfeiffer, and Ludwig Foeger.

Tokle was killed during Operation Encore. While he and his ammunition carrier, Arthur Tokola, attempted to neutralize a German machine gun position with a bazooka, an enemy artillery round detonated the bazooka shells carried by Tokola on his back, killing both men. Tokle was well liked by his fellow soldiers, and his death affected many of them; one considered Tokle's death "the worst day of the war".

After his death, Torger's brothers Kyrre and Arthur E. Tokle moved to the U.S., becoming established ski jumpers and coaches.
