= Alvin P. Wegeman =

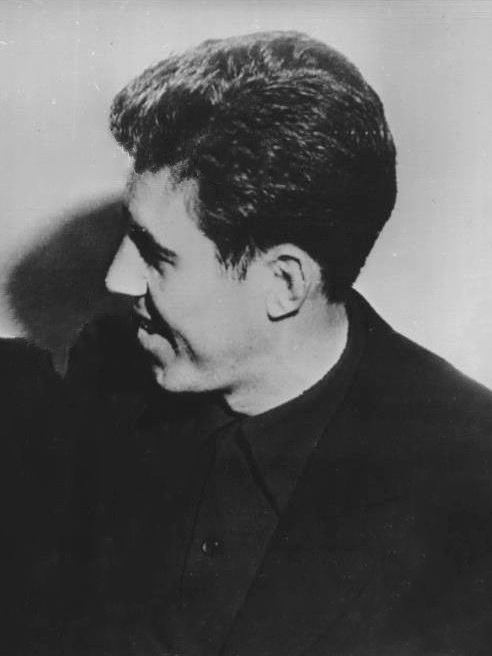
- Wegeman in 1952

Personal information
- Born: March 1, 1927 Denver, Colorado, U.S.
- Died: May 30, 2015 (aged 88) Colorado Springs, U.S.

Sport
- Sport: Nordic combined
- Club: U.S. Navy

Alvin Paul Wegeman (March 1, 1927 – May 30, 2015) was an American Nordic combined skier. While on leave from the U.S. Navy, he competed in the Nordic combined event at the 1952 Winter Olympics, but fell on his third jump did not finish, and was hospitalized with a concussion. Wegeman also competed for the U.S. at the 1950 World Championships in Lake Placid, New York.

A native of Colorado, Wegeman attended the University of Denver and worked as a ski instructor in the Vail area. He later played a key role in instructing future American Winter Olympic athletes by developing the Steamboat Springs area, which would develop more Olympic athletes in Colorado.

Wegeman was inducted into the Colorado Ski and Snowboard Hall of Fame in 1998. His late brother Keith was inducted into that Hall of Fame in 1989. Wegeman also has a niece, Katherine Kelly Lang, known for her portrayal of Brooke Logan on the American soap opera, The Bold and the Beautiful since 1987.

He was the first husband of alpine ski racer Katy Rodolph. They wed in 1951, but kept it secret for a year. They divorced and she remarried in 1956.
