= Josef Císař =

Czech ski jumper

Personal information
- Nationality: Czech
- Born: 27 October 1916

Sport
- Sport: Ski jumping

Josef Císař (born 27 October 1916, date of death unknown) was a Czech ski jumper. He competed in the individual event at the 1948 Winter Olympics.
