= Jean Monnier =

French ski jumper (1924–1995)

Personal information
- Full name: Jean Camille Marius Monnier Benoît
- Nationality: French
- Born: 14 August 1924 Foncine-le-Haut, Jura, France
- Died: 31 August 1996 (aged 72) Pontarlier, Doubs, France

Sport
- Sport: Ski jumping

Jean Camille Marius Monnier Benoît (14 August 1924 – 31 August 1995) was a French ski jumper. He competed in the individual event at the 1948 Winter Olympics.
