= Igino Rizzi =

Italian ski jumper

Personal information
- Nationality: Italian
- Born: 18 October 1924; Ponte di Legno, Italy
- Died: 9 December 2015 (aged 91); Ponte di Legno, Italy

Sport
- Sport: Ski jumping

Igino Rizzi (18 October 1924 – 9 December 2015) was an Italian ski jumper. He competed in the individual event at the 1948 Winter Olympics.
