= Jan Kula =

Polish ski jumper

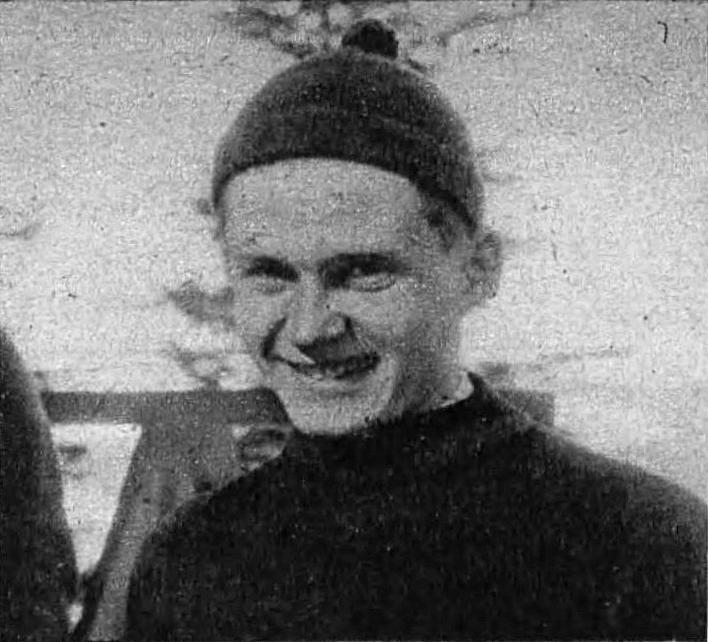
- Jan Kula in 1939

Personal information
- Nationality: Polish
- Born: 2 February 1922 Zakopane, Poland
- Died: 6 April 1995 (aged 73) Zakopane, Poland

Sport
- Sport: Ski jumping

Jan Kula (2 February 1922 – 6 April 1995) was a Polish ski jumper. He competed in the individual event at the 1948 Winter Olympics.
