= Pál Ványa =

Hungarian ski jumper

Personal information
- Nationality: Hungarian
- Born: 13 January 1904 Ipolyvarbó
- Died: 5 October 1967 (aged 63)

Sport
- Sport: Ski jumping

Pál Ványa (13 January 1904 – 5 October 1967) was a Hungarian ski jumper. He competed in the individual event at the 1948 Winter Olympics.
