= Erkki Rajala =

Finnish ski jumper

Personal information
- Nationality: Finnish
- Born: 12 May 1923; Orimattila, Finland
- Died: 5 December 1977 (aged 54); Lahti, Finland

Sport
- Sport: Ski jumping

Erkki Rajala (12 March 1923 – 5 December 1977) was a Finnish ski jumper. He competed in the individual event at the 1948 Winter Olympics.
