= Jónas Ásgeirsson =

Icelandic ski jumper (1920–1996)

Personal information
- Nationality: Icelandic
- Born: 25 August 1920; Húsavík, Iceland
- Died: 14 June 1996 (aged 75); Húsavík, Iceland

Sport
- Sport: Ski jumping

Jónas Ásgeirsson (25 August 1920 – 14 June 1996) was an Icelandic ski jumper. He competed in the individual event at the 1948 Winter Olympics.
