= Ferenc Hemrik =

Hungarian ski jumper

Personal information
- Nationality: Hungarian
- Born: 25 August 1925; Budapest, Hungary
- Died: 12 February 2007 (aged 81); Budapest, Hungary

Sport
- Sport: Ski jumping

Ferenc Hemrik (25 August 1925 – 12 February 2007) was a Hungarian ski jumper. He competed in the individual event at the 1948 Winter Olympics.
