= Nils Lundh =

Swedish ski jumper

Personal information
- Nationality: Swedish
- Born: 21 January 1921; Umeå, Sweden
- Died: 23 October 2005 (aged 84); Älvsbyn, Sweden

Sport
- Sport: Ski jumping

Nils Lundh (21 January 1921 – 23 October 2005) was a Swedish ski jumper. He competed in the individual event at the 1948 Winter Olympics.
