= Luigi Pennacchio =

Italian ski jumper

Personal information
- Nationality: Italian
- Born: 1 January 1933; Temù, Italy
- Died: 21 March 2001 (aged 68)

Sport
- Sport: Ski jumping

Luigi Pennacchio (1 January 1933 – 21 March 2001) was an Italian ski jumper. He competed at the 1956 Winter Olympics and the 1960 Winter Olympics.
