= Antoni Wieczorek =

Polish ski jumper (1924–1992)

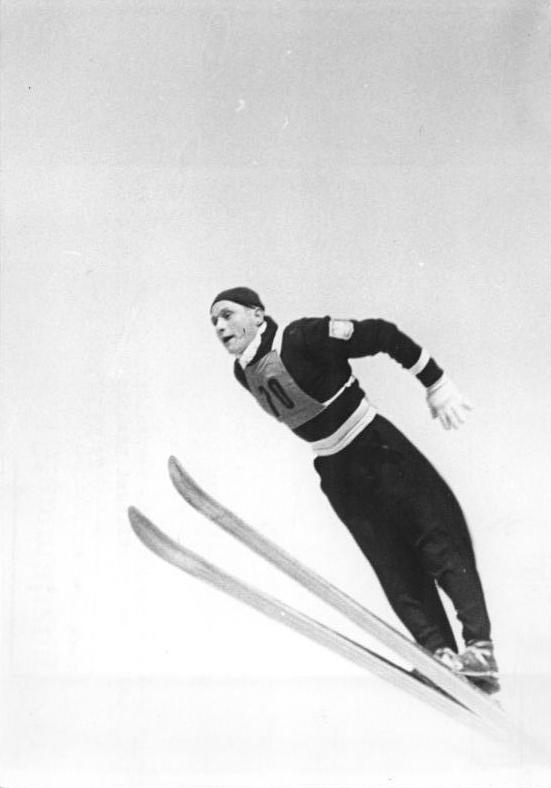
Antoni Wieczorek in 1954

Antoni Wieczorek (8 May 1924 – 16 August 1992) was a Polish ski jumper who competed from 1952 to 1962. He finished 24th in the individual large hill at the 1952 Winter Olympics in Oslo. Wieczorek's best career finish was 5th place in an individual normal hill event in Austria in 1961. He was born in Szczyrk and died in Zlaté Moravce.
