= Niklaus Stump =

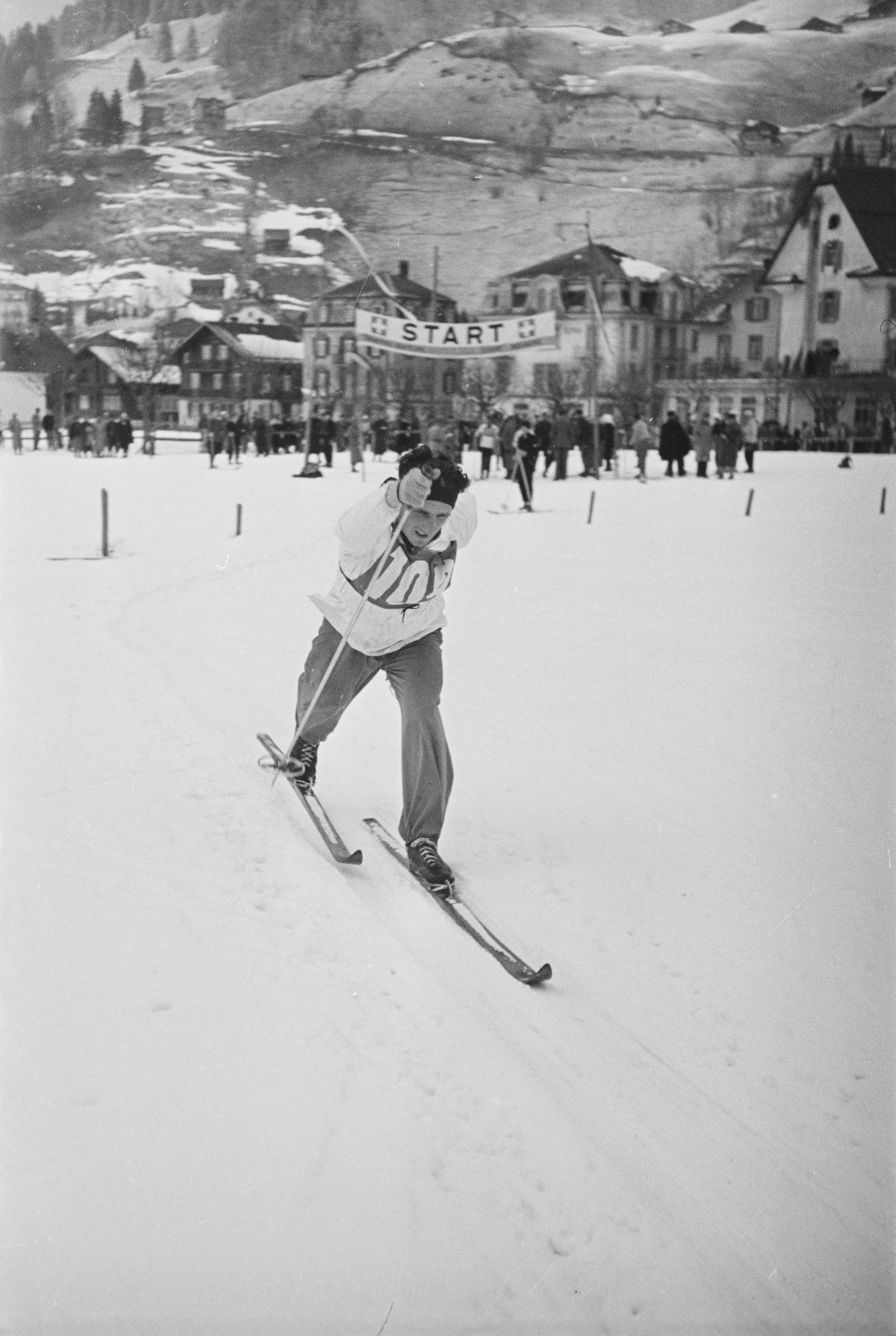
Stump in 1945

Niklaus Stump (23 December 1920 – 30 April 2005) was a Swiss cross-country and Nordic combined skier who competed during the 1940s.

He was born in Toggenburg and died in Wildhaus.

Stump finished fourth in the Nordic combined event at the 1948 Winter Olympics in St. Moritz. He was a member of the Swiss cross-country relay team which finished fifth in the 4x10 km relay competition. In the 18 km event he finished 20th.
