= Sven-Olof Lundgren =

Swedish ski jumper (1908–1946)

Personal information
- Born: 3 November 1908 Örnsköldsvik, Sweden
- Died: 26 March 1946 (aged 37)

Sport
- Sport: Ski jumping

Sven-Olof Lundgren (3 November 1908 – 26 March 1946) was a Swedish ski jumper. He participated at the 1928 Winter Olympics in St. Moritz, where he placed fifth.
