= Miloslav Bělonožník =

Czech ski jumper

Personal information
- Nationality: Czech
- Born: 11 July 1918; Vysoké nad Jizerou, Czechoslovakia
- Died: 12 January 2010 (aged 91); Liberec, Czech Republic

Sport
- Sport: Ski jumping

Miloslav Bělonožník (11 July 1918 – 12 January 2010) was a Czech ski jumper. He competed in the individual event at the 1948 Winter Olympics.
