= Régis Charlet =

French ski jumper

Personal information
- Full name: Régis Edouard Klebert Charlet
- Nationality: French
- Born: 4 May 1920; Chamonix, France
- Died: 31 October 1998 (aged 78); La Tronche, France

Sport
- Sport: Ski jumping

Régis Edouard Klebert Charlet (4 May 1920 – 31 October 1998) was a French ski jumper. He competed in the individual event at the 1948 Winter Olympics.
