= Helmut Hadwiger =

Austrian ski jumper

Personal information
- Nationality: Austrian
- Born: 17 April 1922; Villach, Austria
- Died: 22 October 2004 (aged 82); Villach, Austria

Sport
- Sport: Ski jumping

Helmut Hadwiger (17 April 1922 – 22 October 2004) was an Austrian ski jumper. He competed in the individual event at the 1948 Winter Olympics.
