= Hans Zurbriggen =

Swiss ski jumper

Personal information
- Nationality: Swiss
- Born: 22 February 1920; Saas-Fee, Switzerland
- Died: 23 July 1950 (aged 30)

Sport
- Sport: Ski jumping

Hans Zurbriggen (22 February 1920 – 23 July 1950) was a Swiss ski jumper. He competed in the individual event at the 1948 Winter Olympics.
