= Arsène Lucchini =

French ski jumper

Personal information
- Nationality: French
- Born: 18 September 1922; Chamonix, Haute-Savoie, France
- Died: 4 March 1998 (aged 75); Annecy, Haute-Savoie, France

Sport
- Sport: Ski jumping

Arsène Lucchini (18 September 1922 – 4 March 1998) was a French ski jumper.

== Career ==
He competed in the individual event at the 1948 Winter Olympics.
