= Bruno Da Col =

Italian ski jumper

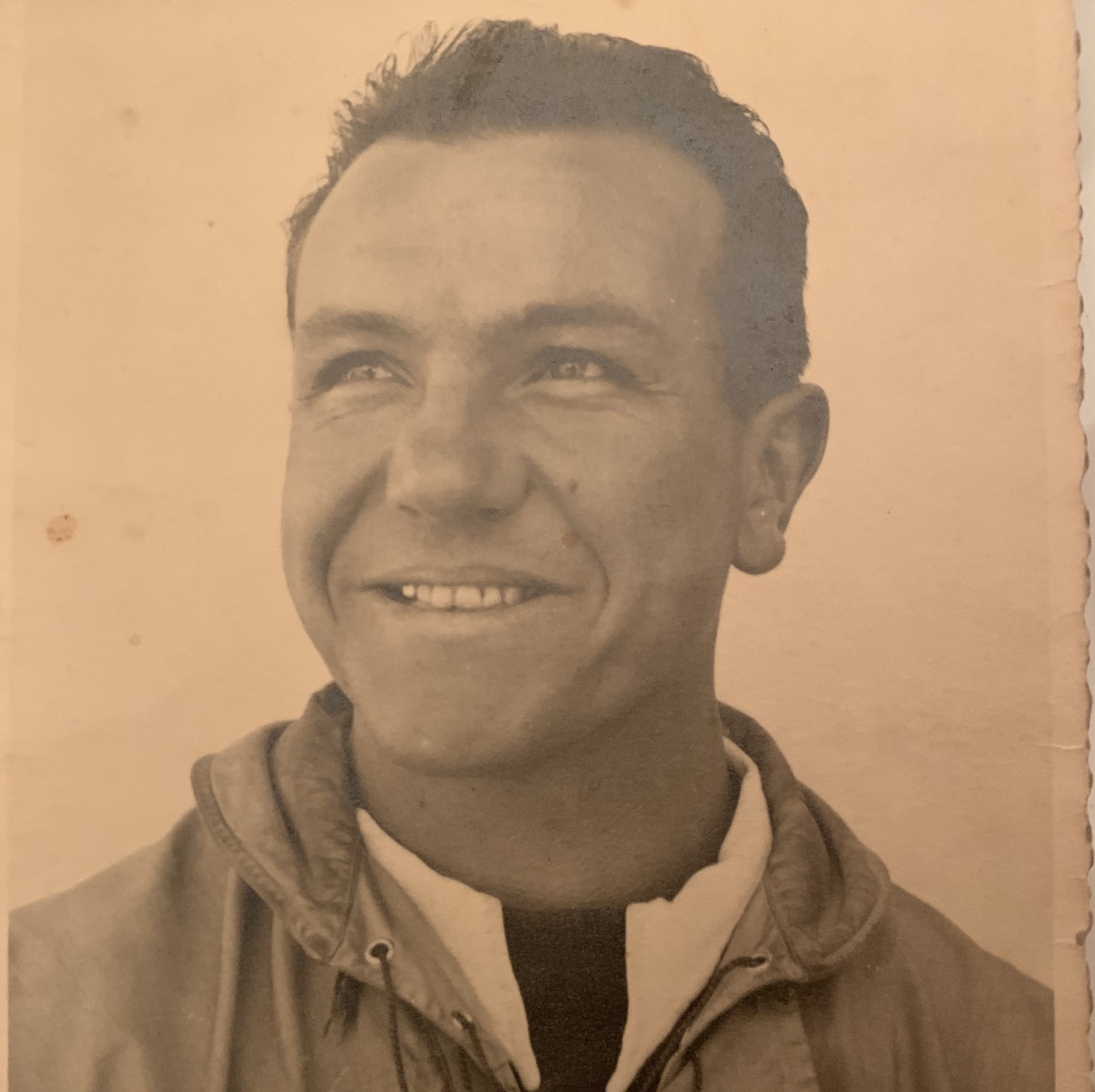

Personal information
- Nationality: Italian
- Born: 25 February 1913
- Died: 29 July 1995 (aged 64)

Sport
- Sport: Ski jumping

Bruno Da Col (25 February 1913 – 29 July 1995) was an Italian ski jumper. He competed at the 1936 Winter Olympics and the 1948 Winter Olympics. In the town of Ponte di Legno, Da Col completed the first ski jump over 100 meters in Italy. He later received a medal of honor for his achievements from Benito Mussolini.
