= Keith R. Wegeman =

American ski jumper

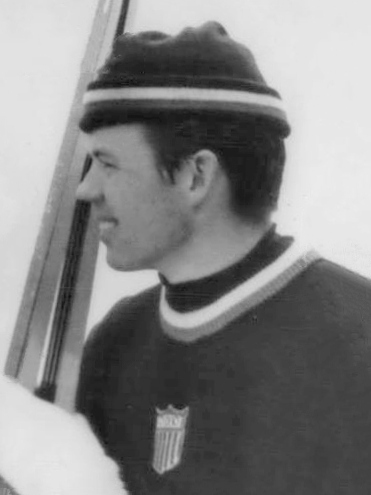
- Wegeman in 1960

Personal information
- Born: August 28, 1929 Denver, Colorado, U.S.
- Died: August 22, 1974 (aged 44) California

Sport
- Sport: Ski jumping

Keith Richard Wegeman (August 28, 1929 – August 22, 1974) was an American ski jumper who competed in the early 1950s. He tied for 12th place in the individual large hill competition at the 1952 Winter Olympics in Oslo.

A native of Colorado, Wegeman was on the national championships ski team at the University of Denver. After college he became a ski instructor for the US Army Mountain and Cold Weather Training Company. In the early 1960s, he moved to Los Angeles, California, and hosted the television series Ski Tips. At the 1960 Winter Olympics in Squaw Valley, he served as a technical advisor.

Wegeman was posthumously inducted into the Colorado Ski and Snowboard Hall of Fame in 1989. His older brother, Alvin, competed as a Nordic combined skier at Oslo and was inducted into the same Hall of Fame in 1998.

Wegeman had a daughter, Katherine Kelly Lang, known for her portrayal of Brooke Logan on the American soap opera, The Bold and the Beautiful. He also provided the human figure, although not the voice of the Jolly Green Giant in early commercials.
