= Aldo Trivella =

Italian ski jumper

Personal information
- Nationality: Italian
- Born: 1 April 1921; St. Moritz, Switzerland
- Died: 2 June 1978 (aged 57); Chiesa in Valmalenco, Italy

Sport
- Sport: Ski jumping

Aldo Trivella (1 April 1921 – 2 June 1978) was an Italian ski jumper. He competed in the individual event at the 1948 Winter Olympics.
