= Sepp Schiffner =

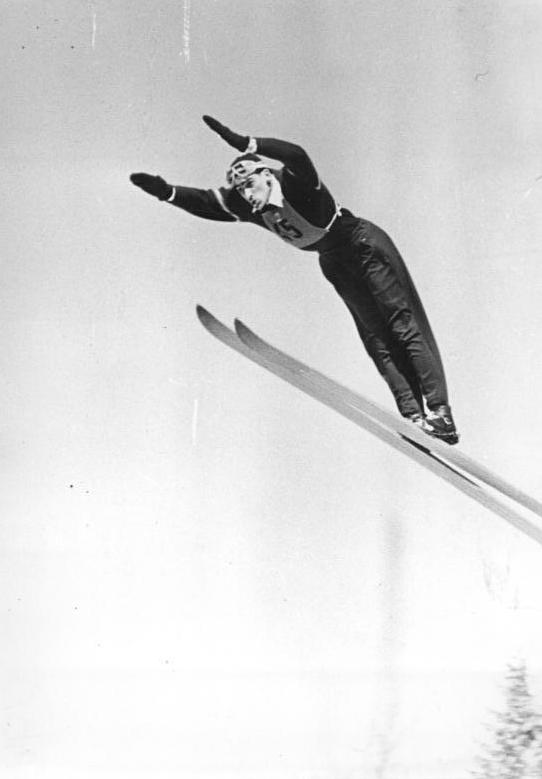
Sepp Schiffner in 1954

Josef "Sepp" Schiffner (born 11 December 1930) was an Austrian and German Nordic skier who competed in the 1950s. He was born in Altaussee. Competing in the 1952 and 1956 Winter Olympics, he earned his best finish of 11th in the Nordic combined event at Cortina d'Ampezzo in 1956. Schiffner also finished 69th in the 18 km cross-country skiing event at Oslo in 1952. After the 1956 Olympic Winter Games (from summer 1956) he competed for West Germany and won the Nordic combined event at Le Brassus [Swiss] on 15 January 1957.
