= Arthur E. Tokle =

American ski jumper

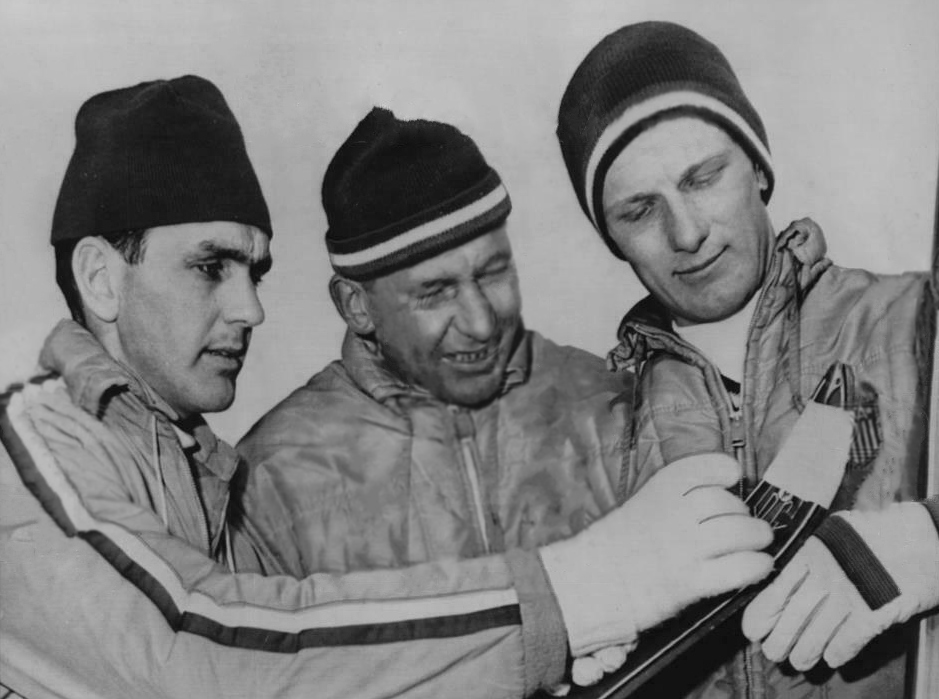
- Tokle (center) with his trainees Gene Kotlarek and John Balfanz in 1963

Personal information
- Born: August 16, 1922 Løkken Verk, Norway
- Died: March 3, 2005 (aged 82) Dover, New Jersey, U.S.

Sport
- Sport: Ski jumping
- Club: Løkken IF; Bear Mountain Ski Club

Arthur Emil Tokle (August 16, 1922 – March 3, 2005) was a Norwegian-born American ski jumper who competed for the United States at the 1952 Winter Olympics in Oslo, finishing 18th in the individual large hill event.

== Biography ==
Tokle was born in Løkken Verk, Norway. He was raised in a family of ski jumpers, with multiple of his siblings competing successfully internationally. His older brother, Torger, had competed in the United States in 1939 and won multiple high-level competitions.

Tokle won his first national championship as a teenager and served in the Kings Guard before immigrating to America in 1947. He was US national ski jumping champion in 1951 and 1953. Tokle carried the American flag during the opening ceremonies of the 1958 FIS Nordic World Ski Championships in Lahti, Finland and competed in the 1960 Winter Olympics in Squaw Valley. He later coached the American ski jumping team at the 1964 and 1968 Winter Olympics. Tokle was inducted in the National Ski Hall of Fame in 1970. He was a technical director for the US team at the 1980 Winter Olympics. He co-authored The Complete Guide to Cross Country Skiing and Touring.

== Personal life ==
In 1948, Tokle married Oddfrid Larsen and settled in Lake Telemark, New Jersey. Together they had two children, Arthur Tokle Jr. and Vivian Lynch.
