= Fritz Tschannen =

Swiss musician and ski jumper (1920–2011)

Personal information
- Nationality: Switzerland
- Born: 13 May 1920 Saint-Imier, Switzerland
- Died: 23 March 2011 (aged 90) Val-de-Travers, Switzerland

Sport
- Sport: Skiing
- Club: SC Adelboden

Achievements and titles
- Personal bests: 120 m (390 ft); Planica, Yugoslavia (15 March 1948)

Fritz Tschannen (13 May 1920 – 23 March 2011) was a Swiss accordion player and former ski jumper born in Saint-Imier, who competed at the 1948 Winter Olympics in St. Moritz. He received his first accordion at the age of five and gave his first solo concert three years later. By the age of 18 he was working as an accordion teacher, in addition to ski jumping out of Skiclub Adelboden.

== Career ==
He joined the Swiss National Team in 1945 and attended the Winter Olympic Games three years later, where he placed ninth in a field of forty-nine competitors in the men's normal hill event. The same year he became the Swiss national champion. On 15 March 1948 he set a new world record distance with a jump of 120 metres (394 ft) at Bloudkova velikanka hill in Planica, Yugoslavia.

== Personal life ==
After his experience at the Olympics, Tschannen was invited to train with the United States team, but moved to Canada when he was denied a work visa because of the ongoing Korean War. He had a career with the Canadian Broadcasting Corporation from 1952–1954 as a musician and orchestrator, including a stint with his own French-language television show. He returned to his native country in 1964 and founded a musical school in the city of Bex. He worked as a conductor until 1999, when he retired to the municipality of Fleurier. He died in Val-de-Travers in March 2011.

== Ski jumping world record ==
Date	Hill	Location	Metres	Feet
15 March 1948	Bloudkova velikanka K120	Planica, Yugoslavia	120	394
