= Evert Karlsson =

Swedish ski jumper

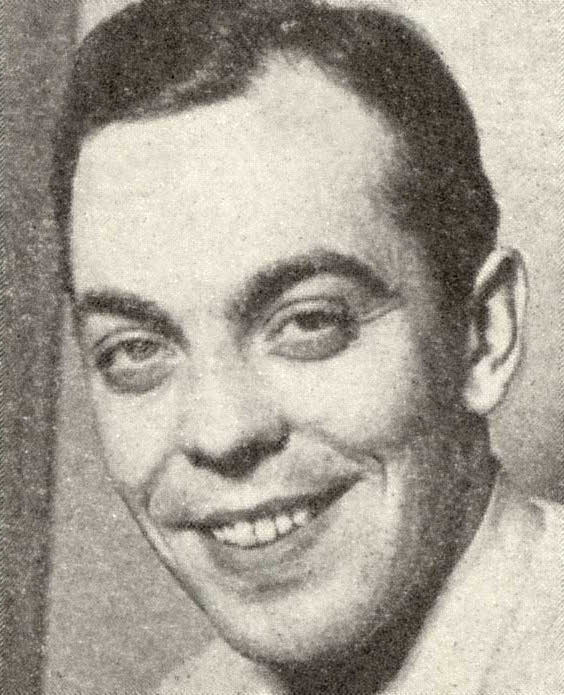

Personal information
- Born: 4 August 1920 Løkken Verk, Norway
- Died: 23 May 1996 (aged 75) Örnsköldsvik, Sweden

Sport
- Sport: Ski jumping
- Club: IF Friska Viljor, Örnsköldsvik

Evert Gotthardt Karlsson (4 August 1920 – 23 May 1996) was a Swedish ski jumper who finished eleventh in the normal hill event at the 1948 Winter Olympics. He won the 1949 Swedish championships, and finished 11th at the 1950 World Ski Championships and 23rd at the 1954 World Ski Championships.

He was born in Løkken Verk in Norway, and grew up there with his ski jumper brothers Arthur and Kåre. They represented the sports club Løkken IF. In 1940 Evert moved to Örnsköldsvik in his father's home country Sweden, and joined the club IF Friska Viljor.
