= Janko Mežik =

Slovenian ski jumper

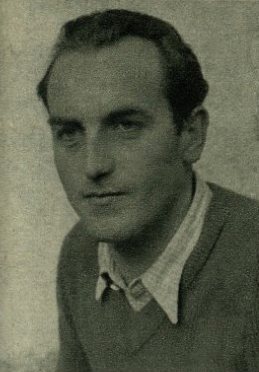

Personal information
- Nationality: Slovenian
- Born: 23 September 1921; Kranjska Gora, Yugoslavia
- Died: 7 March 1998 (aged 76)

Sport
- Sport: Ski jumping

Janko Mežik (23 September 1921 – 7 March 1998) was a Slovenian ski jumper. He competed in the individual event at the 1948 Winter Olympics.
