= Franc Pribošek =

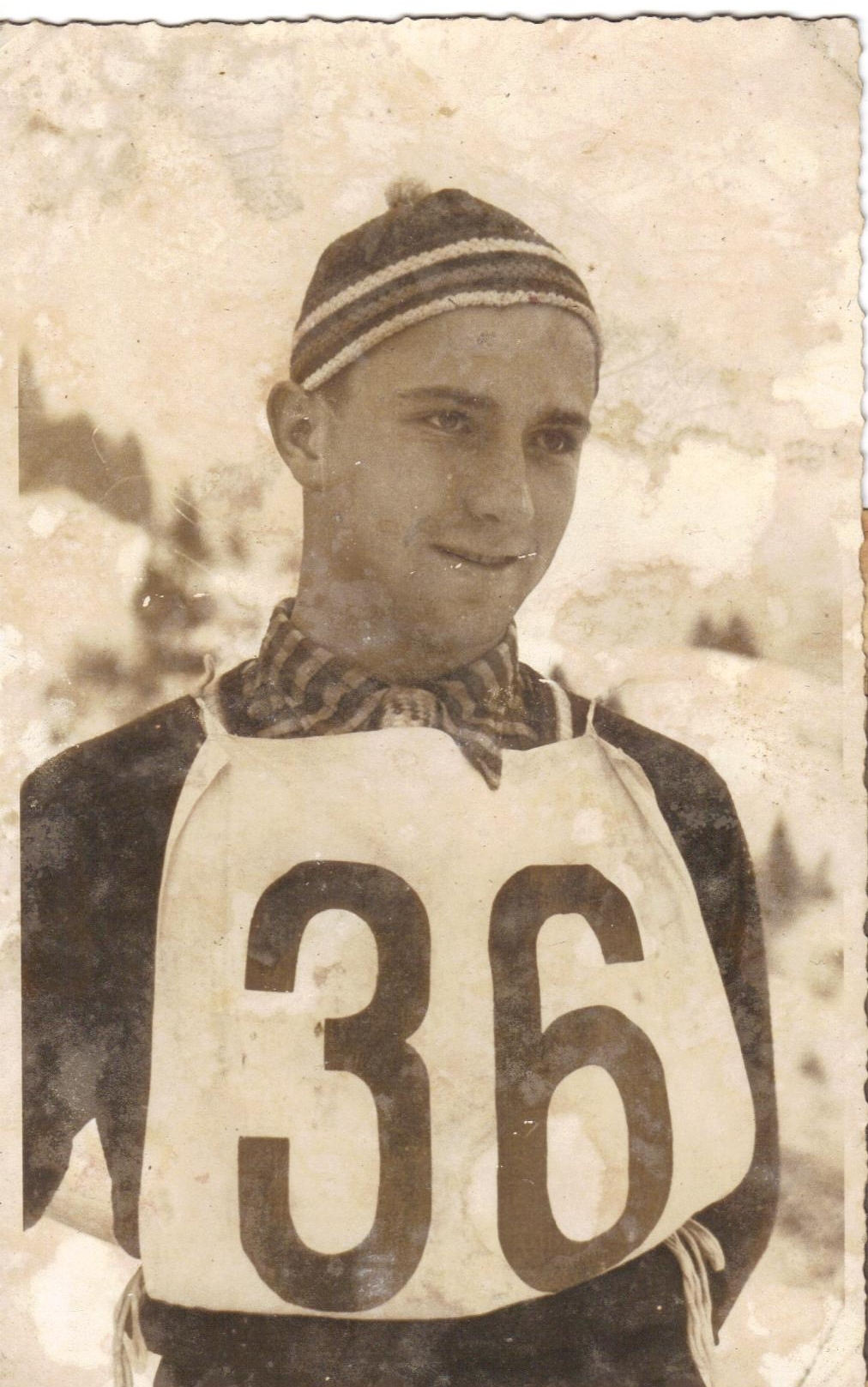
- Country: Yugoslavia
- Born: 14 January 1917; Ljubljana, Austria-Hungary (now Slovenia)
- Died: January 1981 (aged 63–64)

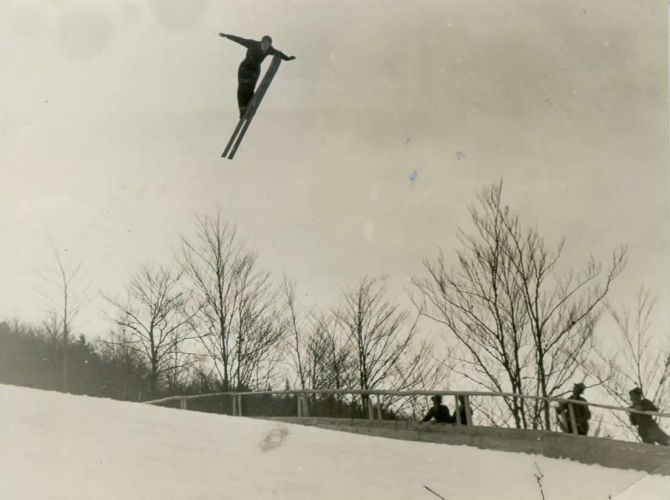
Pribošek in Planica, 1936

Franc Pribošek (14 January 1917 – January 1981) was a Yugoslavian ski jumper. He participated in two Winter Olympics: in 1936 he finished 39th in the normal hill competition in Garmisch-Partenkirchen, and in 1948 he improved on his previous Olympic result with a finish of 32nd in the normal hill competition in St. Moritz. Also in 1936, Pribošek competed in some of the first ever ski flying events on the then-new Bloudkova velikanka hill in Planica.
