= Jože Zidar =

Slovenian ski jumper (1927–2012)

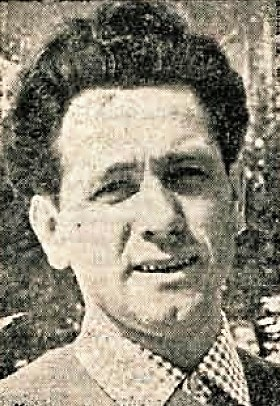
- Jože Zidar in 1960

Personal information
- Nationality: Slovenian
- Born: 7 September 1927; Jesenice, Yugoslavia
- Died: 25 December 2012 (aged 85)

Sport
- Sport: Ski jumping

Jože Zidar (7 September 1927 – 25 December 2012) was a Slovenian ski jumper. He competed in the individual event at the 1956 Winter Olympics.
