= Bine Rogelj =

Slovene ski jumper and caricaturist (1929–2023)

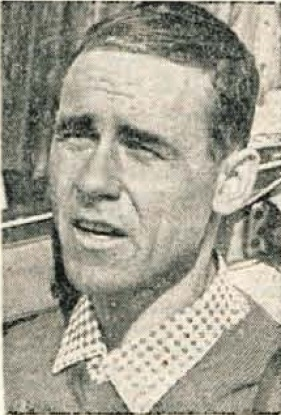

Personal information
- Full name: Albin Rogelj
- Born: 20 February 1929 Ljubljana, Kingdom of Yugoslavia
- Died: 3 February 2023 (aged 93) Ljubljana, Slovenia

Sport
- Sport: Skiing

Albin Rogelj (20 February 1929 – 3 February 2023) was a Slovene ski jumper who represented Yugoslavia at the 1956 Winter Olympics, placing 23rd in the normal hill event. Later, he worked as a caricaturist for the Pavliha satirical weekly, becoming one of the most recognized Slovene caricaturists.
