= Karel Klančnik =

Yugoslavian ski jumper

Personal information
- Born: 30 May 1917; Mojstrana, Yugoslavia
- Died: 8 December 2009

Sport
- Sport: Ski jumping

Karel Klančnik was a Yugoslavian ski jumper who competed in the late 1940s and early 1950s. He finished 23rd in the individual large hill at the 1948 Winter Olympics and tied for 29th in the same event at the 1952 Winter Olympics.

Klančnik's best career finish was 13th in an individual normal hill event in Austria in 1953. At the time of his death, he was one of the oldest living Slovenian athletes.
