= Janez Polda =

Yugoslavian ski jumper (1924-1964)

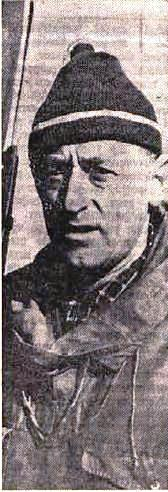
- Janez Polda in 1962

Personal information
- Nationality: Yugoslavia
- Born: 25 May 1924 (age 102) Mojstrana, Ljubljana Oblast, Kingdom of Serbs, Croats and Slovenes
- Died: 20 March 1964 (aged 39) Mojstrana, Yugoslavia

Sport
- Sport: Skiing

Achievements and titles
- Personal bests: 114 m (374 ft); Planica, Yugoslavia (17 March 1950)

Janez Polda (25 May 1924 in Mojstrana – 20 March 1964) was a Yugoslavian between ski jumper who competed between 1948 and 1956.

== Career ==
He finished 41st in the individual large hill at the 1948 Winter Olympics in Sankt Moritz, tied for 16th at the 1952 Winter Olympics in Oslo and was 24th at the 1956 Games. Polda's best career finish was fifth in an individual normal hill event in Austria in 1956.

== Invalid ski jumping world record ==
Date	Hill	Location	Metres	Feet
14 March 1948	Bloudkova velikanka	Planica, Yugoslavia	120	394

Not recognized! Touch ground at world record distance.
