= Planica 1936 =

Ski jumping event in Yugoslavia

Coordinates: 46°28′43″N 13°43′16″E

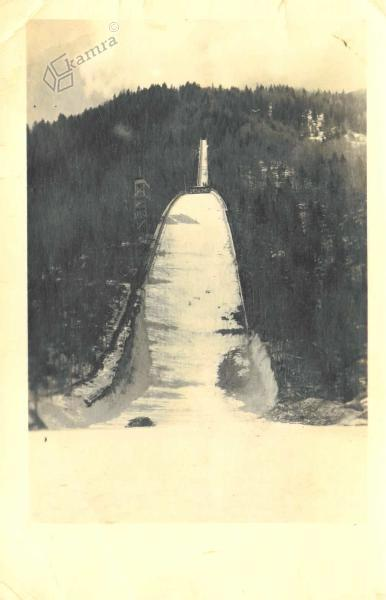
- Host city: Planica, Kingdom of Yugoslavia
- Sports: Ski jumping, ski flying
- Events: International
- Main venue: Bloudkova velikanka K106

Planica 1936 was a ski jumping event, considered as the birth of ski flying, held on 15 March 1936 in Planica, Drava Banovina, Yugoslavia. Total of 16,000 people gathered to watch the competition.

== Schedule ==
| Date | Event | Rounds | Longest jump of the day | Visitors |
|---|---|---|---|---|
| 13 March 1936 | Training | — | weather conditions; high temperatures | — |
| 14 March 1936 | Official training | 1 | 93 metres (305 ft) by Birger Ruud (fall); 75 metres (246 ft) by Albin Novšak | N/A |
| 15 March 1936 | International event | 2 | 85 metres (279 ft) by Gregor Höll | 16,000 |
| 15 March 1936 | Afternoon record battle | 2 | 101.5 metres (333 ft) by Josef Bradl (WR) | 16,000 |

== Competition ==
Training was scheduled, on 13 March, however warm weather with warm wind caused it to be cancelled. A few jumpers did few training jumps on a smaller hill in Rateče, but encountered problems with the wind.

On 14 March, the only training was scheduled for the afternoon, after the weather finally cleared up. Birger Ruud made the longest jump at 93 metres.

The novel discipline of ski flying is considered to have been started by Josef Bradl on 15 March. The trial round began at 10:30 AM and continued with two rounds of international competition. After that, the second round was a non-competitive event with a goal of setting new world records. In the last round of the day, Sepp Bradl became the first man in history to jump over one hundred metres while standing, landing at 101.5 metres. (Note: Bradl's world record distance was published only as 101 meters, as the scoreboard allowed only three numbers to be shown. Slovene daily news Jutro published the figure and international news media cited it. The figure to full precision was 101.5 metres.)

== Results ==
=== Official training ===
15:00 PM — 14 March 1936 — chronological order

| Bib | Name | Country | Dist. |
|---|---|---|---|
| 1 | Albin Novšak | Kingdom of Yugoslavia | 75 m |
| 2 | Franc Pribošek | Kingdom of Yugoslavia | 65 m |
| 3 | Jean Lesseur | Switzerland | 69 m |
| 4 | Olav Ulland | Norway | 68 m |
| 5 | Josef Bradl | Austria | 70 m |
| 6 | Fritz Kainersdorfer | Switzerland | 60 m |
| 7 | Henry Ødegård | Norway | 75 m |
| 8 | Birger Ruud | Norway | 93 m |
| 9 | Rudolf Rieger | Austria | 74 m |

=== Trial round ===
10:30 AM — 15 March 1936 — Trial jump — chronological order

| Bib | Name | Country | Dist. |
|---|---|---|---|
| 1 | Albin Novšak | Kingdom of Yugoslavia | 72 m |
| 2 | Harald Reinl | Austria | 67 m |
| 3 | Oldřich Buďárek | Czechoslovakia | 73 m |
| 4 | Renné Léuba | Switzerland | 55 m |
| 5 | Rudolf Vrána | Czechoslovakia | 60 m |
| 6 | Franz Aschenwald | Austria | 68.5 m |
| 7 | Jean Lesseur | Switzerland | 61 m |
| 8 | Gregor Höll | Austria | 71 m |
| 9 | Rudolf Rieger | Austria | 58 m |
| 10 | Jaroslav Lukeš | Czechoslovakia | 61 m |
| 11 | Josef Bradl | Austria | 72 m |
| 12 | Gustl Maier | Austria | 64 m |

=== International competition ===
11:00 AM — 15 March 1936 — Two rounds — chronological order

| Bib | Name | Country | Dist. |
|---|---|---|---|
First round
| 1 | Harald Reinl | Austria | 67.5 m |
| 2 | Oldřich Buďárek | Czechoslovakia | 78 m |
| 3 | Renné Léuba | Switzerland | 58 m |
| 4 | Rudolf Vrána | Czechoslovakia | 63 m |
| 5 | Franc Pribošek | Kingdom of Yugoslavia | 63 m |
| 6 | Albin Novšak | Kingdom of Yugoslavia | 69.5 m |
| 7 | Franz Aschenwald | Austria | 70.5 m |
| 8 | Jean Lesseur | Switzerland | 64 m |
| 9 | Gregor Höll | Austria | 72 m |
| 10 | Rudolf Rieger | Austria | 71 m |
| 11 | Jaroslav Lukeš | Czechoslovakia | 63 m |
| 12 | Josef Bradl | Austria | 77 m |
| 13 | Gustl Maier | Austria | 61 m |
Second round
| 14 | Harald Reinl | Austria | 84 m |
| 15 | Oldřich Buďárek | Czechoslovakia | 86 m |
| 16 | Renné Léuba | Switzerland | 65.5 m |
| 17 | Rudolf Vrána | Czechoslovakia | N/A |
| 18 | Franc Pribošek | Kingdom of Yugoslavia | 63 m |
| 19 | Albin Novšak | Kingdom of Yugoslavia | 77 m |
| 20 | Franz Aschenwald | Austria | 77 m |
| 21 | Jean Lesseur | Switzerland | 71 m |
| 22 | Gregor Höll | Austria | 85 m |
| 23 | Rudolf Rieger | Austria | 80 m |
| 24 | Jaroslav Lukeš | Czechoslovakia | 63.5 m |
| 25 | Josef Bradl | Austria | 78 m |
| 26 | Gustl Maier | Austria | 65.5 m |

=== Non-competition record hunting event ===
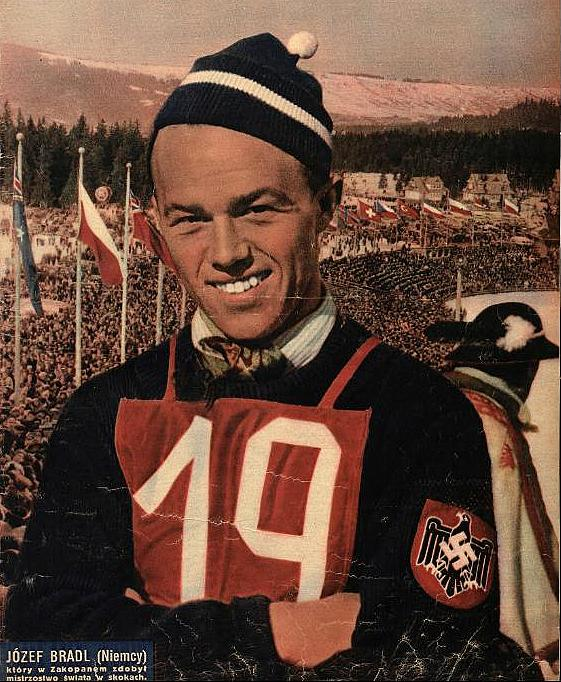
Josef Bradl became the first man in history perform a standing jump over 100 metres and won the competition.

13:45 PM — 15 March 1936 — Two rounds — chronological order

| Bib | Name | Country | Dist. |
|---|---|---|---|
First round, 13:45 PM
| 1 | Jean Lesseur | Switzerland | 72 m |
| 2 | Renné Léuba | Switzerland | 70 m |
| 3 | Josef Bradl | Austria | 88 m |
| 4 | Oldřich Buďárek | Czechoslovakia | 90 m |
| 5 | Gustl Maier | Austria | 70 m |
| 6 | Franz Aschenwald | Austria | 74 m |
| 7 | Rudolf Rieger | Austria | 82 m |
| 8 | Harald Reinl | Austria | 87 m |
| 9 | Franc Pribošek | Kingdom of Yugoslavia | 71 m |
| 10 | Albin Novšak | Kingdom of Yugoslavia | 80 m |
Second round, 14:10 PM
| 11 | Jean Lesseur | Switzerland | 77 m |
| 12 | Renné Léuba | Switzerland | 72 m |
| 13 | Josef Bradl | Austria | 101.5 m |
| 14 | Oldřich Buďárek | Czechoslovakia | 95 m |
| 15 | Franz Aschenwald | Austria | 96 m |
| 16 | Rudolf Rieger | Austria | 88 m |
| 17 | Harald Reinl | Austria | 98 m |
| 18 | Franc Pribošek | Kingdom of Yugoslavia | 77 m |
| 19 | Albin Novšak | Kingdom of Yugoslavia | 89.5 m |

World record and first recorded standing jump over 100 m
Fall or touch

== Official results ==
=== International competition ===
| Rank | Name | Points |
|---|---|---|
| 1 | (Austria) Josef Bradl | 213.6 |
| 2 | (Austria) Gregor Höll | 208.6 |
| 3 | (Austria) Rudolf Rieger | 203.1 |
| 4 | (Austria) Harald Reinl | 198.5 |
| 5 | (Austria) Franz Aschenwald | 195.9 |
| 6 | (Switzerland) Jean Lesseur | 188.9 |
| 7 | (Kingdom of Yugoslavia) Albin Novšak | 188.8 |
| 8 | (Czechoslovakia) Rudolf Vrána | 179.2 |
| 9 | (Austria) Gustl Maier | 178.2 |
| 10 | (Czechoslovakia) Jaroslav Lukeš | 175.7 |
| 11 | (Kingdom of Yugoslavia) Franc Pribošek | 174.9 |
| 12 | (Czechoslovakia) Oldřich Buďárek | 151.5 |
| 13 | (Switzerland) Renné Léuba | 0.0 |

== Also applied this year ==
But non of them haven't jumped at all these days:

- Norway — Sigmund Ruud, Gunnar. K. Hagen, Björn Karlson, Kaarby (four chosen boycott)
- Austria — Walter Delle Karth Sr., Walter Weissenbacher, Erwin Ludescher
- Switzerland — Marcel Raymond, Walter Kuster

== Ski flying world record ==
| Date | Name | Country | Metres | Feet |
|---|---|---|---|---|
| 15 March 1936 | Josef Bradl | Austria | 101.5 | 333 |

== Boycott by Norway ==
Four competitors from Norway who were chosen to compete boycotted the event. They objected because the hill was bigger than allowed at the time. They demanded a hill rearrangement to the K80 standard. When negotiation with the organizers failed, they left the event the middle of the trial round and under the leadership of Sigmund Ruud.
