= Planica 1935 =

Coordinates: 46°28′43″N 13°43′16″E

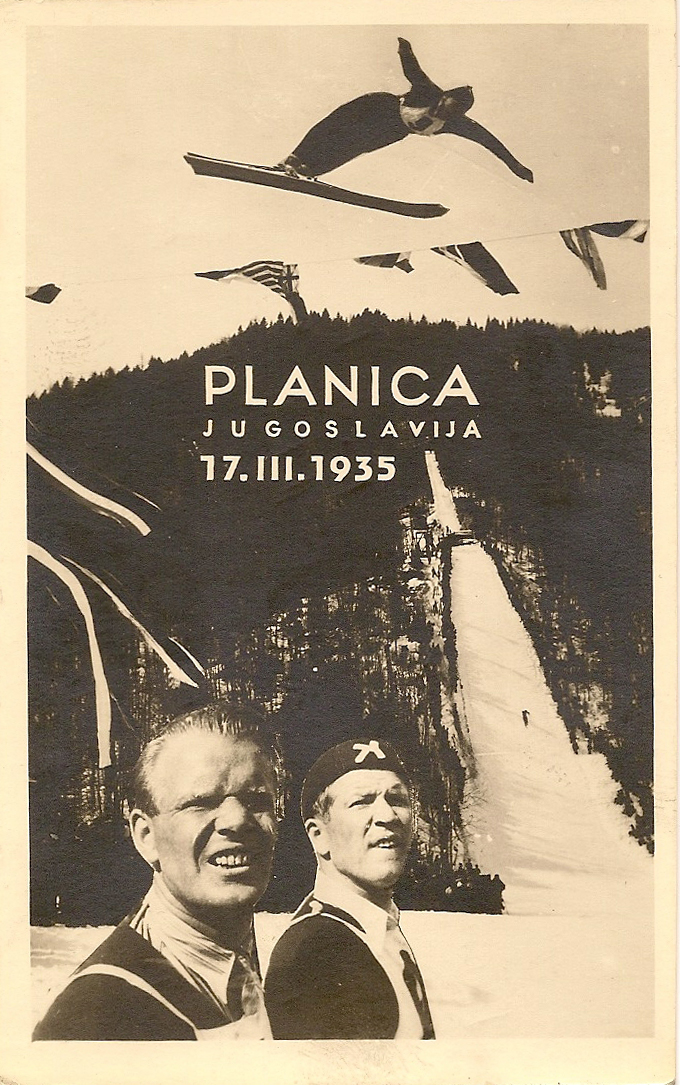
- Host city: Planica, Kingdom of Yugoslavia
- Sport: Ski jumping
- Events: International
- Main venue: Bloudkova velikanka K106

Planica 1935 was a ski jumping event held on 17 March 1935 in Planica, Drava Banovina, Kingdom of Yugoslavia. Total of 12,500 people have gathered in the competition.

== Schedule ==
Date	Event	Rounds	Longest jump of the day	Visitors
13 March 1935	Unofficial training	4	88 metres (289 ft) by Stanisław Marusarz	N/A
14 March 1935	Official training 1	1	93 metres (305 ft) by Reidar Andersen (WR)	N/A
15 March 1935	Official training 2	6	99 metres (325 ft) by Reidar Andersen (WR)	500
17 March 1935	International event	3	95 metres (312 ft) by Reidar Andersen	12,000

== Competition ==
On 13 March 1935 unofficial training was held with only three jumpers performing in a couple of rounds: Marusarz, Novšak and Norbert Knobloch. The longest jump of the day was at 88 metres.

On 14 March 1935 first official training with many competititors at start. Reidar Andersen set the world record in his third attempt at 93 metres.

On 15 March 1935 second official training was on schedule with three world records: Stanisław Marusarz landed at 95 metres and Reidar Andersen two times that day at 99 metres.

On 17 March 1935 there was an international competition in three rounds and the winner was Polish Stanisław Marusarz. Longest jump of the day was set by Reidar Andersen at 95 metres.

=== Unofficial training ===
13 March 1935 — chronological order of jumps not available

Bib	Name	Country	Jump 1	Jump 2	Jump 3	Jump 4
N/A	Stanisław Marusarz	Poland	76 m	78 m	88 m	85 m
N/A	Albin Novšak	Poland	42 m	52 m	58 m	—
N/A	Norbert Knobloch	Austria	54 m	—	—	—

=== First official training ===
11:00 AM — 14 March 1935 — chronological order

Bib	Name	Country	Dist.
1	Randmod Sørensen	Norway	76 m
2	Reidar Andersen	Norway	86 m
3	Bronisław Czech	Poland	67 m
4	Josef Bradl	Austria	72 m
5	Walter Reinhardt	Austria	58 m
6	Stanisław Marusarz	Poland	90 m
7	Albin Novšak	Kingdom of Yugoslavia	57 m
8	Randmod Sørensen	Norway	80 m
9	Franc Pribošek	Kingdom of Yugoslavia	57 m
10	Hubert Köstinger	Austria	65 m
11	Reidar Andersen	Norway	87 m
12	Randmod Sørensen	Norway	90 m
13	Reidar Andersen	Norway	93 m
14	Josef Bradl	Austria	50–60 m
15	Walter Reinhardt	Austria	50–60 m
16	Hubert Köstinger	Austria	50–60 m
17	Franc Pribošek	Kingdom of Yugoslavia	62 m
18	Bogo Šramel	Kingdom of Yugoslavia	62 m
19	Stanisław Marusarz	Poland	91 m
20	Franc Palme	Kingdom of Yugoslavia	55 m
21	Tone Dečman	Kingdom of Yugoslavia	62 m

=== Second official training ===
Morning — 15 March 1935 — chronological order of jumps not available

Bib	Name	Country	Round 1	Round 2	Round 3
Morning jumps
N/A	Josef Bradl	Austria	75 m	76 m	81 m
N/A	Gregor Höll	Austria	65 m	72 m	72 m
N/A	Hans Mariacher	Austria	72 m	75 m	—
N/A	Bohuslav Kadavý	Czechoslovakia	60–70 m average (N/A)		
N/A	Alfred Steinmüller	Czechoslovakia	60–70 m average (N/A)		
N/A	Rudolf Vrána	Czechoslovakia	60–70 m average (N/A)		
N/A	Antonín Bartoň	Czechoslovakia	60–70 m average (N/A)		
N/A	František Šimůnek	Czechoslovakia	60–70 m average (N/A)		
N/A	Albin Novšak	Kingdom of Yugoslavia	62 m	—	—
N/A	Franc Pribošek	Kingdom of Yugoslavia	62 m	—	—
N/A	Franc Pribošek	Kingdom of Yugoslavia	62 m	—	—
N/A	Bogo Šramel	Kingdom of Yugoslavia	62 m	—	—
N/A	Franc Palme	Kingdom of Yugoslavia	62 m	—	—
N/A	Tone Dečman	Kingdom of Yugoslavia	62 m	—	—
N/A	Guido Borter	Switzerland	N/A	—	—
N/A	Marcel Raymond	Switzerland	70 m	—	—
N/A	Stanisław Marusarz	Poland	82 m	78 m	88 m
N/A	Farup	Norway	80 m	—	—
N/A	Reidar Andersen	Norway	85 m	—	—
N/A	Randmod Sørensen	Norway	86 m	—	—
Afternoon jumps, 14:00 PM
N/A	Stanisław Marusarz	Poland	86 m	92 m	95 m
N/A	Reidar Andersen	Norway	89 m	98 m	99 m
N/A	Randmod Sørensen	Norway	87 m	95 m	—
N/A	Gregor Höll	Austria	82 m	87 m	—
N/A	Josef Bradl	Austria	80 m	89 m	91 m
N/A	Marcel Raymond	Switzerland	81 m	86 m	—
N/A	Rudolf Vrána	Czechoslovakia	82 m	—	—
N/A	Farup	Norway	82 m	89 m	—
N/A	Bronisław Czech	Poland	83 m	—	—

=== International competition ===
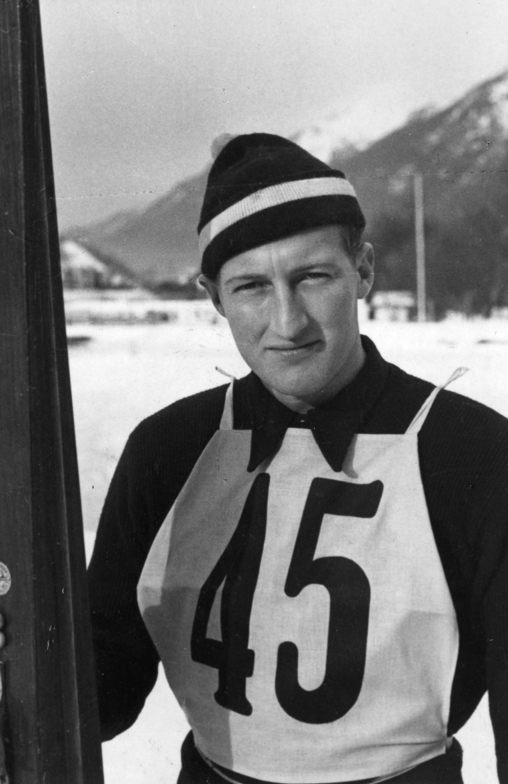
Reidar Andersen set 3 WRs

11:30 AM — 17 March 1935 — Two rounds — chronological order

Bib	Name	Country	Dist.
First round
1	Stanisław Marusarz	Poland	84 m
2	Guido Borter	Switzerland	77 m
3	Marcel Raymond	Switzerland	73 m
4	Bohuslav Kadavý	Czechoslovakia	61 m
5	Albin Novšak	Kingdom of Yugoslavia	67 m
6	Gregor Höll	Austria	79 m
7	Alfred Steinmüller	Czechoslovakia	77.5 m
8	Rudolf Vrána	Czechoslovakia	N/A
9	Antonín Bartoň	Czechoslovakia	85.5 m
10	Bronisław Czech	Poland	74 m
11	František Šimůnek	Czechoslovakia	64 m
12	Bogo Šramel	Kingdom of Yugoslavia	68 m
Second round
13	Stanisław Marusarz	Poland	87.5 m
14	Guido Borter	Switzerland	86 m
15	Marcel Raymond	Switzerland	86.5 m
16	Bohuslav Kadavý	Czechoslovakia	62 m
17	Albin Novšak	Kingdom of Yugoslavia	74 m
18	Gregor Höll	Austria	83.5 m
19	Alfred Steinmüller	Czechoslovakia	68 m
20	Antonín Bartoň	Czechoslovakia	82 m
21	Bronisław Czech	Poland	69 m
22	František Šimůnek	Czechoslovakia	65 m
23	Bogo Šramel	Kingdom of Yugoslavia	72 m
Third round
24	Stanisław Marusarz	Poland	80.5 m
25	Guido Borter	Switzerland	76 m
26	Marcel Raymond	Switzerland	72 m
27	Bohuslav Kadavý	Czechoslovakia	61 m
28	Albin Novšak	Kingdom of Yugoslavia	62 m
29	Gregor Höll	Austria	81 m
30	Alfred Steinmüller	Czechoslovakia	75 m
31	Antonín Bartoň	Czechoslovakia	78 m
32	Bronisław Czech	Poland	64.5 m
33	František Šimůnek	Czechoslovakia	61 m
34	Bogo Šramel	Kingdom of Yugoslavia	67 m

World record!
Fall or touch!

== Official results ==
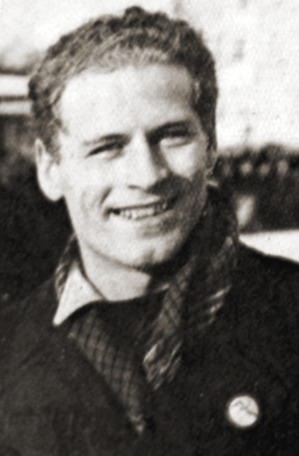
S. Marusarz won and set WR

=== International competition ===
Rank	Name	Points
1	(Poland) Stanisław Marusarz	326.1
2	(Czechoslovakia) Antonín Bartoň	312.9
3	(Switzerland) Marcel Raymond	304.6
4	(Switzerland) Guido Borter	298.9
5	(Poland) Bronisław Czech	285.3
6	(Czechoslovakia) Alfred Steinmüller	283.9
7	(Kingdom of Yugoslavia) Bogo Šramel	270.9
8	(Austria) Gregor Höll	265.2
9	(Czechoslovakia) František Šimůnek	258.1
10	(Czechoslovakia) Bohuslav Kadavý	241.4
11	(Kingdom of Yugoslavia) Albin Novšak	217.6

== Ski jumping world records ==
Date	Name	Country	Metres	Feet
14 March 1935	Reidar Andersen	Norway	93	305
15 March 1935	Stanisław Marusarz	Poland	95	312
15 March 1935	Reidar Andersen	Norway	99	325
15 March 1935	Reidar Andersen	Norway	99	325
