= Planica 1934 =

Coordinates: 46°28′43″N 13°43′16″E

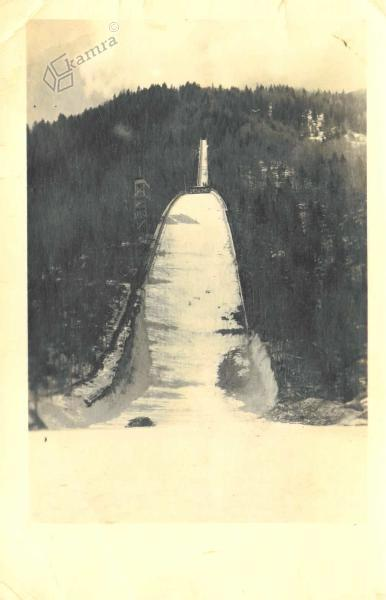
- Host city: Planica, Kingdom of Yugoslavia
- Sport: Ski jumping
- Events: Nationals (4 February 1934); International (25 March 1934)
- Main venue: Bloudkova velikanka K90

Planica 1934 refers to a ski jumping event with national championships held on 4 February 1934 and the first international event on 25 March 1934 in Planica, Drava Banovina, Kingdom of Yugoslavia.

== Schedule ==
| Date | Event | Rounds | Longest jump of the day | Visitors |
|---|---|---|---|---|
| 4 March 1934 | Nationals | 2 | 62.5 metres (205 ft) by Tone Dečman (fall); 60 metres (197 ft) by Franc Palme | 2,500 |
| 23 March 1934 | Official training 1 | 1 | 83 metres (273 ft) by Gregor Höll (fall); 79 metres (259 ft) by Birger Ruud | N/A |
| 24 March 1934 | Official training 2 | 1 | 87 metres (285 ft) by Birger Ruud (WR crash); 85.5 metres (281 ft) by Sigmund Ruud | N/A |
| 25 March 1934 | International event | 2 | 86.5 metres (284 ft) by Sigmund Ruud | 4,000 |
| 25 March 1934 | Afternoon record battle | 2 | 95 metres (312 ft) by Sigmund Ruud (WR fall); 92 metres (302 ft) by Birger Ruud (WR) | 4,000 |

== 1934: Snow cement invention ==
At the 1934 nationals championships opening event, "snow cement", a mixture of salammoniac and salt hardens snow, was used for the first time in the world by Ivan Rožman, the original hill constructor.

== National championships ==
On 4 February 1934 Bloudkova velikanka hill was officially opened with national championships of the Kingdom of Yugoslavia. The Norwegian Jahr made the opening jump and landed at 55 meters. Franc Palme became the national champion of the Kingdom of Yugoslavia with the national record of 60 meters.

=== Opening competition ===
14:30 PM — 4 February 1934 — Two rounds — chronological order

| Bib | Name | Country | Dist. |
|---|---|---|---|
Opening jump
| 1 | Jahr | Norway | 55 m |
First round
| 2 | Bogo Šramel | Kingdom of Yugoslavia | 50 m |
| 3 | Rado Istenič | Kingdom of Yugoslavia | 55 m |
| 4 | Zupan | Kingdom of Yugoslavia | 50 m |
| 5 | Tone Dečman | Kingdom of Yugoslavia | 56 m |
| 6 | Milan Šubic | Kingdom of Yugoslavia | 48 m |
| 7 | Edo Bevc | Kingdom of Yugoslavia | 55 m |
| 8 | Gregor Klančnik | Kingdom of Yugoslavia | 40 m |
| 9 | Albin Jakopič | Kingdom of Yugoslavia | 50.5 m |
| 10 | Franc Palme | Kingdom of Yugoslavia | 55 m |
| 11 | Rudolf Hunger | Nazi Germany | 54 m |
Trial jump 2
| 12 | Jahr | Norway | 62 m |
Second round
| 13 | Bogo Šramel | Kingdom of Yugoslavia | 54 m |
| 14 | Rado Istenič | Kingdom of Yugoslavia | 56 m |
| 15 | Zupan | Kingdom of Yugoslavia | 50 m |
| 16 | Tone Dečman | Kingdom of Yugoslavia | 62.5 m |
| 17 | Edo Bevc | Kingdom of Yugoslavia | 58 m |
| 18 | Gregor Klančnik | Kingdom of Yugoslavia | 48 m |
| 19 | Albin Jakopič | Kingdom of Yugoslavia | 50.5 m |
| 20 | Franc Palme | Kingdom of Yugoslavia | 60 m |
| 21 | Rudolf Hunger | Nazi Germany | 60 m |

== International event ==
On 23 March 1934 the first training session was held before the international event. A few hill records were set that day, with Gregor Höll setting the highest record at 83 metres (91 yd).

There was a second training event on 24 March 1934 before the international competition. Sigmund Ruud broke the hill record at 85.5 metres (93.5 yd) and Birger Ruud crashed at the world record distance of 87 metres (95 yd).

On 25 March 1934 two different events were held with a total of fourteen competitors from the Kingdom of Yugoslavia, Austria and Norway. The first competition started at noon and comprised two rounds. The second competition began at 1:00 PM. Jumps outside of competition were taken when Ruud set the world record distance at 92 metres (101 yd) in the last round.

=== First official training ===
Afternoon — 23 March 1934 — order of jumps not available

| Name | Country | Dist. |
|---|---|---|
| Oyvind Alstad | Norway | 63 m |
| Per G. Jonson | Norway | 67 m |
| Reidar Hoff | Norway | 69 m |
| Sigmund Guttormsen | Norway | 69 m |
| Olav Ulland | Norway | 70 m |
| Sverre Lassen-Urdahl | Norway | 70 m |
| Randmod Sørensen | Norway | 72 m |
| Birger Ruud | Norway | 79 m |
| Sigmund Ruud | Norway | 82 m |
| Gregor Höll | Austria | 83 m |
| Albin Novšak | Kingdom of Yugoslavia | 49 m |
| Franc Palme | Kingdom of Yugoslavia | 58 m |
| Bogo Šramel | Kingdom of Yugoslavia | 60 m |
| Rado Istenič | Kingdom of Yugoslavia | 63 m |

=== Second official training ===
Afternoon — 24 March 1934 — order of jumps not available

| Name | Country | Dist. |
|---|---|---|
| Oyvind Alstad | Norway | 60–70 m |
| Per G. Jonson | Norway | 60–70 m |
| Reidar Hoff | Norway | 60–70 m |
| Sigmund Guttormsen | Norway | 60–70 m |
| Sverre Lassen-Urdahl | Norway | 60–70 m |
| Randmod Sørensen | Norway | 60–70 m |
| Albin Novšak | Kingdom of Yugoslavia | N/A |
| Franc Palme | Kingdom of Yugoslavia | N/A |
| Bogo Šramel | Kingdom of Yugoslavia | N/A |
| Rado Istenič | Kingdom of Yugoslavia | N/A |
| Olav Ulland | Norway | 83 m |
| Gregor Höll | Austria | 85 m |
| Sigmund Ruud | Norway | 85.5 m |
| Birger Ruud | Norway | 87 m |

=== International competition ===
12:00 PM — 25 March 1934 — Two rounds — chronological order

| Bib | Name | Country | Dist. |
|---|---|---|---|
First round
| 1 | Walter Weissenbacher | Austria | 57 m |
| 2 | Sigmund Guttormsen | Norway | 69 m |
| 3 | Franc Palme | Kingdom of Yugoslavia | 55 m |
| 4 | Reidar Hoff | Norway | 63 m |
| 5 | Randmod Sørensen | Norway | 71 m |
| 6 | Sigmund Ruud | Norway | 68.5 m |
| 7 | Albin Novšak | Kingdom of Yugoslavia | 48 m |
| 8 | Birger Ruud | Norway | 69 m |
| 9 | Oyvind Alstad | Norway | 59 m |
| 10 | Per G. Jonson | Norway | 71 m |
| 11 | Gustl Mayer | Austria | 59 m |
| 12 | Gregor Höll | Austria | 74 m |
| 13 | Olav Ulland | Norway | 71 m |
| 14 | Sverre Lassen-Urdahl | Norway | 71 m |
Second round
| 15 | Walter Weissenbacher | Austria | 63 m |
| 16 | Sigmund Guttormsen | Norway | 82 m |
| 17 | Franc Palme | Kingdom of Yugoslavia | 66 m |
| 18 | Reidar Hoff | Norway | 58 m |
| 19 | Randmod Sørensen | Norway | 75 m |
| 20 | Sigmund Ruud | Norway | 86.5 m |
| 21 | Albin Novšak | Kingdom of Yugoslavia | 57.5 m |
| 22 | Birger Ruud | Norway | 79 m |
| 23 | Oyvind Alstad | Norway | 66 m |
| 24 | Per G. Jonson | Norway | 80 m |
| 25 | Gustl Mayer | Austria | 60 m |
| 26 | Gregor Höll | Austria | 81 m |
| 27 | Olav Ulland | Norway | 76 m |
| 28 | Sverre Lassen-Urdahl | Norway | 71 m |

== Non-competition event ==
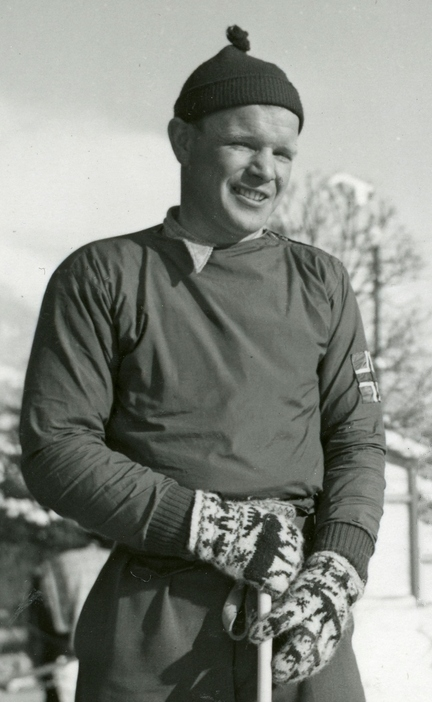
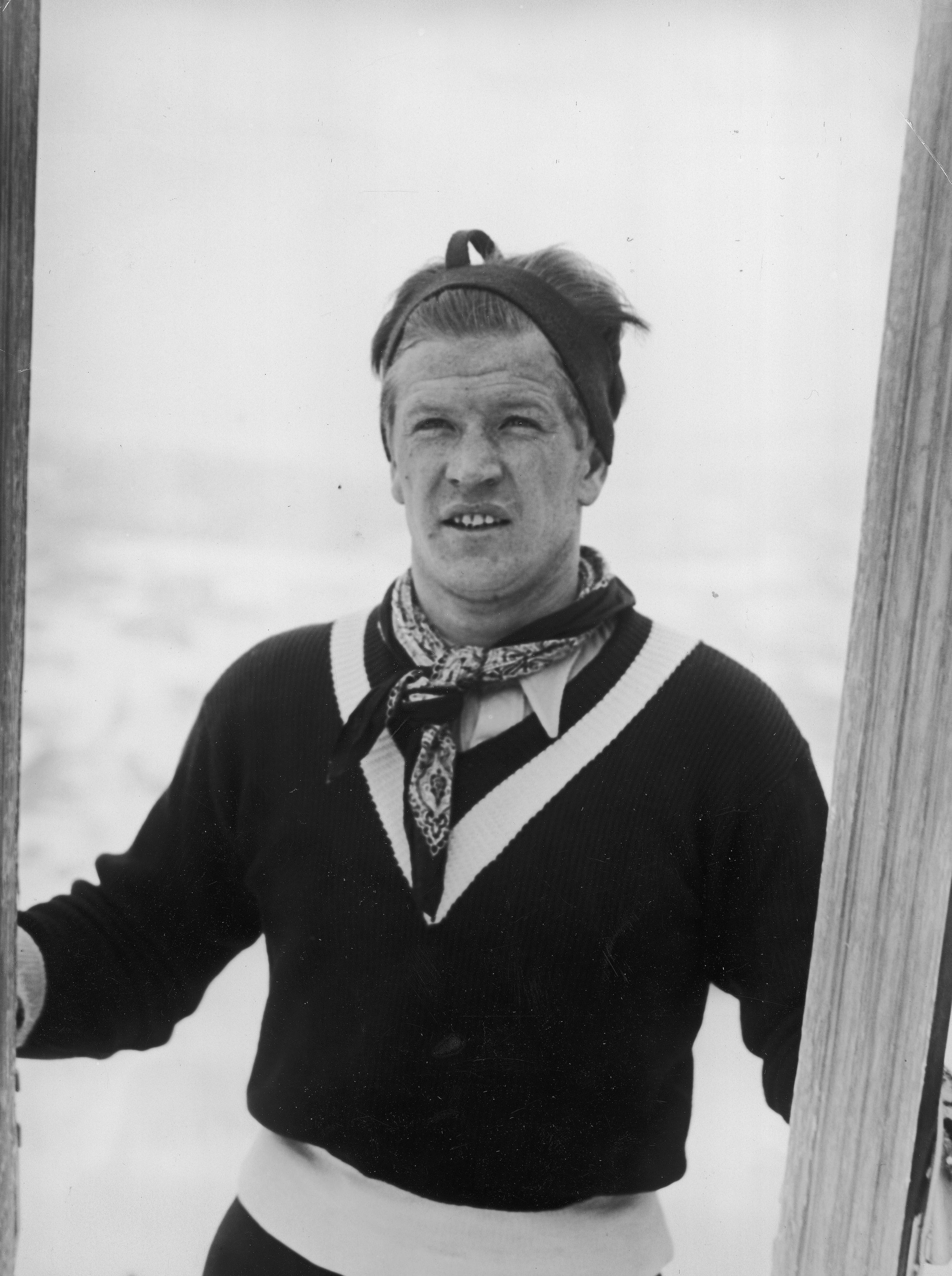
brothers Sigmund and Birger Ruud (heroes of Planica 1934)

=== Afternoon battle for the record jump ===
13:00 PM — 25 March 1934 — Two rounds — chronological order

| Bib | Name | Country | Dist. |
|---|---|---|---|
First round
| 1 | Walter Weissenbacher | Austria | 71 m |
| 2 | Sigmund Guttormsen | Norway | 74 m |
| 3 | Gustl Mayer | Austria | 66 m |
| 4 | Randmod Sörensen | Norway | 78 m |
| 5 | Franc Palme | Kingdom of Yugoslavia | 67 m |
| 6 | Albin Novšak | Kingdom of Yugoslavia | 64 m |
| 7 | Reidar Hoff | Norway | 70 m |
| 8 | Sverre Lassen-Urdahl | Norway | 79 m |
| 9 | Olav Ulland | Norway | 76 m |
| 10 | Oyvind Alstad | Norway | 78 m |
| 11 | Per G. Jonson | Norway | 84 m |
| 12 | Gregor Höll | Austria | 89 m |
| 13 | Birger Ruud | Norway | 86 m |
| 14 | Sigmund Ruud | Norway | 95 m |
Second round
| 15 | Walter Weissenbacher | Austria | 65 m |
| 16 | Sigmund Guttormsen | Norway | 85.5 m |
| 17 | Birger Ruud | Norway | 92 m |
| 18 | Gregor Höll | Austria | 84.5 m |
| 19 | Per G. Jonson | Norway | 88.5 m |
| 20 | Sigmund Ruud | Norway | 87 m |
| 21 | Reidar Hoff | Norway | 78 m |
| 22 | Albin Novšak | Kingdom of Yugoslavia | 66 m |
| 23 | Franc Palme | Kingdom of Yugoslavia | 65.5 m |

World record not recognized. Crash
Hill record
World record
Fall or touch

== Official results ==
=== International competition ===
25 March 1934

| Rank | Name | Points |
|---|---|---|
| 1 | (Norway) Birger Ruud | 218.2 |
| 2 | (Norway) Sigmund Ruud | 217.2 |
| 3 | (Austria) Gregor Höll | 214.7 |
| 4 | (Norway) Olav Ulland | 209.1 |
| 5 | (Norway) Randmod Sørensen | 205.5 |
| 6 | (Norway) Per G. Jonson | 203.0 |
| 7 | (Norway) Sverre Lassen-Urdahl | 201.3 |
| 8 | (Norway) Oyvind Alstad | 179.7 |
| 9 | (Norway) Reidar Hoff | 179.5 |
| 10 | (Austria) Walter Weissenbacher | 171.2 |
| 11 | (Austria) Gustl Mayer | 164.3 |
| 12 | (Norway) Sigmund Guttormsen | 154.5 |
| 13 | (Kingdom of Yugoslavia) Albin Novšak | 154.1 |
| 14 | (Kingdom of Yugoslavia) Franc Palme | 130.3 |

=== National Championships ===
4 February 1934

| Rank | Name | Points |
|---|---|---|
| 1 | (Kingdom of Yugoslavia) Franc Palme | 136.5 |
| 2 | (Kingdom of Yugoslavia) Rado Istenič | 134.6 |
| 3 | (Kingdom of Yugoslavia) Gregor Klančnik | 109.7 |
| 4 | (Nazi Germany) Rudolf Hunger | 99.4 |
| 5 | (Kingdom of Yugoslavia) Bogo Šramel | 95.4 |
| 6 | (Kingdom of Yugoslavia) Albin Jakopič | 91.4 |
| 7 | (Kingdom of Yugoslavia) Tone Dečman | 68.6 |
| 8 | (Kingdom of Yugoslavia) Edo Bevc | 65.8 |

== Ski jumping world records ==
| Date | Name | Country | Metres | Feet |
|---|---|---|---|---|
| 25 March 1934 | Gregor Höll | Austria | 89 | 292 |
| 25 March 1934 | Sigmund Ruud | Norway | 95 | 312 |
| 25 March 1934 | Birger Ruud | Norway | 92 | 302 |

Not recognized. Crash at world record distance
