= Planica 1940 =

Coordinates: 46°28′43″N 13°43′16″E

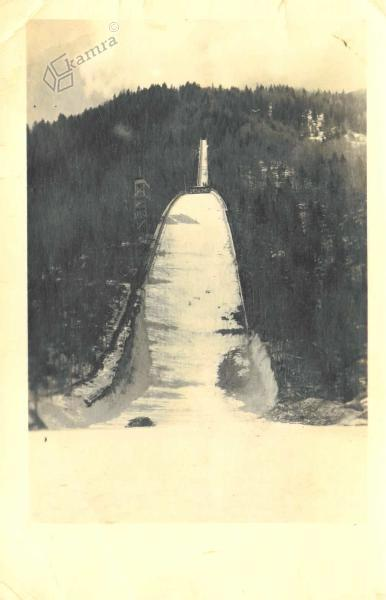
- Host city: Planica, Kingdom of Yugoslavia
- Sport: Ski flying
- Events: Ski Flying Study Week
- Main venue: Bloudkova velikanka K120

Planica 1940 was a ski flying study week, allowed only in study purposes, with main competition held on 10 March 1940 in Planica, Drava Banovina, Kingdom of Yugoslavia. Over 6,000 people has gathered.

== Schedule ==
Date	Event	Rounds	Longest jump of the day	Visitors
6 March 1940	Practise 1	—	75 metres (246 ft) by Albin Novšak	N/A
7 March 1940	Practise 2	—	65 metres (213 ft) by Albin Jakopič	N/A
8 March 1940	Official training 1	4	88 metres (289 ft) by Josef Bradl	N/A
9 March 1940	Official training 2	4	101.5 metres (333 ft) by Josef Bradl	N/A
10 March 1940	Competition	5	96 metres (315 ft) by Gregor Höll	6,000

== Competition ==
On 6 March 1940, training was on schedule, but canceled due to strong wind. Albin Novšak was first and the only one who jumped that day, landing at 75 metres.

On 7 March 1940, training was on schedule, but canceled due to strong wind. Albin Jakopič was first only one who jumped that day, landing at 65 metres.

On 8 March 1940, first official training was on schedule at last, after two days of waiting due to strong wind. Josef Bradl set the distance of the day at 88 metres.

On 9 March 1940, second official training was on schedule. Total of 46 jumps and three times over one hundred metres. Josef Bradl set the distance of the day at 101.5 metres.

On 10 March 1940, the ski flying study competition in front of 6,000 people was on schedule. Among the 13 competitors on start, Gregor Höll won in Planica for the first and only time.

=== Official training 1 ===
8 March 1940 – 12:30 PM – Four rounds

Bib	Name	Country	Round 1	Round 2	Round 3	Round 4
1	Albin Jakopič	Kingdom of Yugoslavia	60 m	69 m	67 m	—
2	Franc Pribošek	Kingdom of Yugoslavia	65 m	74 m	—	—
3	Josef Bradl	Nazi Germany	75 m	77 m	80 m	88 m
4	Herbert Friedl	Nazi Germany	74.5 m	67 m	74 m	75 m
5	Heinz Palme	Nazi Germany	73 m	75 m	76 m	84 m
6	Paul Näckel	Nazi Germany	73 m	78 m	79 m	85 m
7	Hans Marr	Nazi Germany	71 m	77 m	75 m	—
8	Gregor Höll	Nazi Germany	77 m	82 m	83 m	86 m
9	Franz Mair	Nazi Germany	75 m	84 m	83 m	—
10	Gustl Berauer	Nazi Germany	77 m	77 m	83 m	78 m
11	Sepp Weiler	Nazi Germany	75 m	78 m	78 m	—
12	Albin Novšak	Kingdom of Yugoslavia	74 m	72 m	73 m	—
13	Rudi Finžgar	Kingdom of Yugoslavia	65 m	58 m	69 m	—

=== Official training 2 ===
9 March 1940 – Four rounds

Bib	Name	Country	Round 1	Round 2	Round 3	Round 4
1	Franc Pribošek	Kingdom of Yugoslavia	67.5 m	70 m	—	—
2	Karel Klančnik	Kingdom of Yugoslavia	73.5 m	71 m	-	—
3	Rudi Finžgar	Kingdom of Yugoslavia	61 m	65 m	87 m	—
4	Herbert Friedl	Nazi Germany	79 m	87 m	92 m	94 m
5	Gregor Höll	Nazi Germany	75 m	95 m	84 m	82 m
6	Paul Näckel	Nazi Germany	76 m	93.5 m	95 m	98 m
7	Hans Marr	Nazi Germany	77 m	91.5 m	93 m	—
8	Josef Bradl	Nazi Germany	81 m	96 m	96.5 m	101.5 m
9	Heinz Palme	Nazi Germany	80 m	91 m	95 m	92 m
10	Franz Mair	Nazi Germany	84 m	88 m	97 m	100 m
11	Gustl Berauer	Nazi Germany	83 m	93 m	99 m	100 m
12	Sepp Weiler	Nazi Germany	80 m	91 m	95 m	92 m
13	Albin Novšak	Kingdom of Yugoslavia	77 m	87 m	88 m	87 m

Fall or touch!

== Official results ==
=== Ski Flying Study competition ===
10 March 1940 – 12:00 PM – Five rounds – ranking incomplete – points were not available to media

Rank	Bib	Name	Country	Round 1	Round 2	Round 3	Round 4	Round 5
1	6	Gregor Höll	Nazi Germany	90 m	90 m	91 m	96 m	93 m
2	4	Josef Bradl	Nazi Germany	85 m	85 m	89 m	89 m	93 m
3	8	Gustl Berauer	Nazi Germany	90 m	92 m	90 m	90 m	88 m
4	5	Paul Häckel	Nazi Germany	89 m	84 m	90 m	89 m	90 m
5	12	Hans Marr	Nazi Germany	85 m	85 m	89 m	88 m	92 m
N/A	11	Franz Mair	Nazi Germany	88 m	85 m	85 m	83 m	92 m
N/A	10	Herbert Friedl	Nazi Germany	86 m	86 m	86 m	88 m	86 m
N/A	7	Heinz Palme	Nazi Germany	85 m	86 m	89 m	87 m	86 m
N/A	3	Sepp Weiler	Nazi Germany	89 m	79 m	85 m	84 m	94 m
N/A	1	Karel Klančnik	Kingdom of Yugoslavia	66 m	77 m	83 m	77 m	77 m
N/A	2	Franc Pribošek	Kingdom of Yugoslavia	79 m	75 m	76 m	79 m	82 m
N/A	9	Albin Novšak	Kingdom of Yugoslavia	78 m	80 m	78 m	81 m	80 m
N/A	13	Rudi Finžgar	Kingdom of Yugoslavia	61 m	72 m	74 m	80 m	84 m
