= Planica 1954 =

Coordinates: 46°28′43″N 13°43′16″E

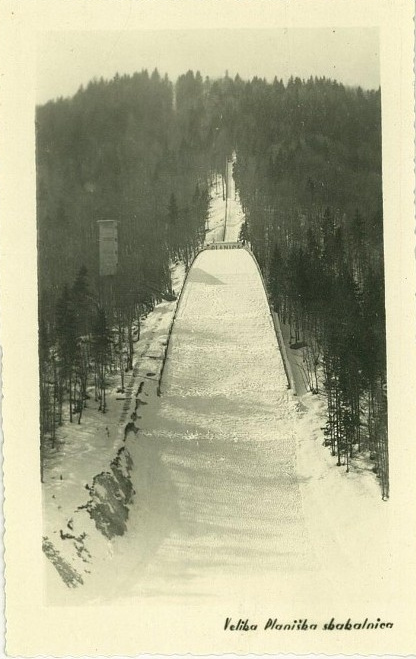
- Host city: Planica, FPR Yugoslavia
- Sport: Ski flying
- Events: International Ski Flying Week
- Main venue: Bloudkova velikanka K120

Planica 1954 was an international ski flying week competition, held from 13 to 14 March 1954 in Planica, PR Slovenia, FPR Yugoslavia. It was the first event after first huge hill renovation. 25,000 people visited in four days.

== Schedule ==
Date	Event	Rounds	Longest jump of the day	Visitors
11 March 1954	Qualification event K80	N/A	82 metres (269 ft) by Thynes (standing); 86 metres (282 ft) by Erlandson (touch)	—
12 March 1954	Training K80 (morning); Training K120 (afternoon)	1; 3	74.5 metres (244 ft) by Ossi Laaksonen; 109 metres (358 ft) by Jack Alfredsen	N/A
13 March 1954	International event: day 1	3	110 metres (361 ft) by Jack Alfredsen	8,000
14 March 1954	International event: day 2	2	114.5 metres (376 ft) by Jack Alfredsen (standing); 119 metres (390 ft) by Jack Alfredsen (fall)	15,000

== Competitions ==
On 11 March 1954, first training on Srednja Bloudkova K80 normal hill was on schedule, which also counted as qualification for main event on large hill, with about total 100 jumps in all rounds. Norwegian ski jumper Thynes was the longest with 82 metres that day, meanwhile Swedish ski jumper Erlandson touched the snow at 86 metres. Janez Gorišek was the best among domestic jumpers at 70 metres.

On 12 March 1954, they made one trial jump on K80 in the morning, when 42 years old Birger Ruud jumped 62 m and the longest was Laaksonen with 74.5 m. Later first training in three rounds, on completely renovated Bloudkova velikanka K120 hill was on schedule with 41 athletes on start. At 11:15 AM there was official opening of renovated hill with new "Planica Fanfares" theme song. Norwegian ski jumper Jack Alfredsen set the distance of the day at 109 m.

On 13 March 1954, first day of competition with 38 competitors on start was on schedule in front of 8,000 people. With one trial round and two rounds counting for result. Jack Alfredsen was the longest with 110 metres, leading after two jumps.

On 14 March 1954, second and the final day of competition was on schedule in front of 15,000 people. With one trial round and only one round in count due to bad weather conditions. Jack Alfredsen set the longest valid distance of this year competition at 114.5 metres and crashed at 119 metres. Finnish ski jumper Ossi Laaksonen won the two days competitions by points.

=== Training 1 (Qualifications) ===
11 March 1954 – Srednja Bloudkova K80 – Three rounds – incomplete

Bib	Name	Country	Round 1
N/A	Thynes	Norway	82 m
N/A	Erlandson	Sweden	86 m
N/A	Janez Gorišek	Yugoslavia	70 m
N/A	Bine Rogelj	Yugoslavia	67 m
N/A	Jože Langus	Yugoslavia	62 m
N/A	Jože Zidar	Yugoslavia	69 m
N/A	Albin Adlešič	Yugoslavia	68 m
N/A	Janez Saksida	Yugoslavia	64 m
N/A	Antti Hyvärinen	Finland	N/A
N/A	Josef Bradl	Austria	N/A

=== Training 2 ===
12 March 1954 – 11:15 AM – Bloudkova velikanka K120 – Three rounds – incomplete

Bib	Name	Country	Round 1	Round 2	Round 3
1	Blassi	Switzerland	N/A	N/A	N/A
3	Pohl	West Germany	N/A	N/A	N/A
5	Jože Langus	Yugoslavia	75.5 m	99 m	75 m
6	Albin Adlešič	Yugoslavia	69 m	76 m	76 m
8	Walter Steinegger	Austria	92 m	103 m	102.5 m
9	Mato Krznarič	Yugoslavia	98 m	81.5 m	79 m
11	Janez Saksida	Yugoslavia	83.5 m	84 m	80.5 m
14	Taraldsen	Norway	N/A	N/A	N/A
15	Antti Hyvärinen	Finland	90.5 m	96 m	100 m
16	Sverre Stallvik	Norway	95 m	98 m	97 m
21	Rudi Finžgar	Yugoslavia	85.5 m	93 m	95 m
24	Bine Rogelj	Yugoslavia	84 m	93 m	89 m
27	Janez Gorišek	Yugoslavia	78 m	93 m	88 m
30	Hermann Anwander	West Germany	N/A	N/A	N/A
35	Jože Zidar	Yugoslavia	88 m	92 m	100.5 m
38	Josef Bradl	Austria	84 m	93 m	93 m
40	Simon Slåttvik	Norway	93 m	98.5 m	100.5 m
41	Oieser	Norway	N/A	N/A	N/A
N/A	Aaro Pokka	Finland	94 m	102 m	98 m
N/A	Sven Pettersson	Sweden	88 m	96 m	102 m
N/A	Otto Leodolter	Austria	85 m	92 m	102 m
N/A	Ossi Laaksonen	Finland	88 m	108 m	100.5 m
N/A	Hemmo Silvennoinen	Finland	82 m	90.5 m	97.5 m
N/A	Max Bolkart	West Germany	82 m	107 m	84 m
N/A	Körber	Austria	88 m	105 m	—
N/A	Bror Östman	Sweden	81 m	104 m	97 m
N/A	Jack Alfredsen	Norway	94 m	109 m	108.5 m
41 competitors on start in total; 14 N/A

=== International Ski Flying Week: Day 1 ===
13 March 1954 – Three rounds – incomplete

Rank	Bib	Name	Country	Trial	Round 1	Round 2	Points
1	12	Jack Alfredsen	Norway	103 m	103 m	110 m	221.4
2	2	Ossi Laaksonen	Finland	92.5 m	100 m	106 m	208.3
3	32	Hemmo Silvennoinen	Finland	87 m	94 m	101.5 m	201.9
4	9	Sven Pettersson	Sweden	97 m	96 m	102.5 m	201.8
5	20	Max Bolkart	West Germany	93 m	93 m	101.5 m	198.1
6	11	Antti Hyvärinen	Finland	91 m	92 m	97 m	N/A
7	14	Simon Slåttvik	Norway	92 m	93 m	101 m	197.7
8	8	Sverre Stallvik	Norway	91 m	90 m	101 m	197.5
9	21	Bror Östman	Sweden	95 m	96.5 m	101 m	197.4
10	19	Walter Steinegger	Austria	101.5 m	96.5 m	103 m	196.1
11	13	Josef Bradl	Austria	98 m	95 m	100 m	194.5
12	24	Thynes	Norway	92 m	95 m	91 m	191.3
13	29	Aaro Pokka	Finland	98 m	99 m	93 m	189.6
14	17	Andreas Däscher	Switzerland	94 m	93 m	97 m	189.5
15	22	Otto Leodolter	Austria	91 m	92.5 m	98 m	185.9
16	26	Erlandson	Sweden	83 m	91 m	94 m	185.5
17	10	Körber	Austria	88 m	91 m	93 m	182.2
18	3	Rudolf Dietrich	Austria	90 m	86 m	93 m	177.3
19	18	Jože Zidar	Yugoslavia	102.5 m	92 m	99 m	176.8
20	16	Bine Rogelj	Norway	84 m	84 m	87 m	173.3
21	6	Rudi Finžgar	Yugoslavia	96 m	90 m	100.5 m	170.4
22	31	Baier	West Germany	90 m	87 m	93 m	169.5
23	5	Hermann Anwander	West Germany	91 m	84 m	93 m	168.1
24	39	Karl Holmström	Sweden	94 m	94 m	101 m	168.0
25	28	Jože Langus	Yugoslavia	79 m	79 m	89 m	164.4
26	33	Janez Saksida	Yugoslavia	81 m	84 m	89 m	163.0
. . . . .
29	7	Mato Krznarič	Yugoslavia	85 m	76 m	88.5 m	156.8
30	23	Albin Adlešič	Yugoslavia	67 m	86 m	83 m	156.3
N/A	1	Régis Rey	France	N/A	N/A	N/A	N/A
N/A	4	Bläsl	Switzerland	N/A	N/A	N/A	N/A
N/A	15	Monier	France	N/A	N/A	N/A	N/A
N/A	25	Richard Rabasa	France	N/A	N/A	N/A	N/A
N/A	27	Erwin Steinegger	Austria	N/A	N/A	N/A	N/A
N/A	30	Richard Bühler	Switzerland	N/A	N/A	N/A	N/A
N/A	34	Janez Gorišek	Yugoslavia	N/A	N/A	N/A	N/A
N/A	35	Siegfried Kostner	Austria	N/A	N/A	N/A	N/A
N/A	36	Pohl	West Germany	N/A	N/A	N/A	N/A
N/A	37	Toni Wieser	Austria	N/A	N/A	N/A	N/A
DNS	38	Taraldsen	Norway	—	—	—	—

Fall or touch!

=== International Ski Flying Week: Day 2 ===
14 March 1954 – 10 AM – Two rounds – incomplete

Rank	Bib	Name	Country	Trial	Round 1
N/A	1	Simon Slåttvik	Norway	102 m	103.5 m
N/A	2	Rudi Finžgar	Yugoslavia	102 m	103 m
N/A	3	Bläsl	Switzerland	89 m	95 m
N/A	4	Régis Rey	France	76 m	86 m
N/A	5	Körber	Austria	97 m	97.5 m
N/A	6	Erlandson	Sweden	95.5 m	104 m
N/A	7	Jože Langus	Yugoslavia	81 m	89 m
N/A	8	Hermann Anwander	West Germany	89 m	93 m
N/A	9	Otto Leodolter	Austria	105 m	105 m
N/A	10	Ossi Laaksonen	Finland	103 m	109.5 m
N/A	11	Jože Zidar	Yugoslavia	91 m	96 m
N/A	12	Bine Rogelj	Norway	85 m	96.5 m
N/A	13	Sven Pettersson	Sweden	94.5 m	102 m
N/A	14	Andreas Däscher	Switzerland	95.5 m	101 m
N/A	15	Antti Hyvärinen	Finland	100 m	105 m
N/A	16	Monier	France	86.5 m	89 m
N/A	17	Walter Steinegger	Austria	107 m	97.5 m
N/A	18	Jack Alfredsen	Norway	114.5 m	119 m
N/A	19	Max Bolkart	West Germany	104 m	105.5 m
N/A	20	Rudolf Dietrich	Austria	99 m	99 m
N/A	21	Bror Östman	Sweden	105.5 m	98 m
N/A	22	Richard Rabasa	France	87 m	90 m
N/A	23	Sverre Stallvik	Norway	99 m	97 m
N/A	24	Aaro Pokka	Finland	112 m	116 m
N/A	25	Mato Krznarič	Yugoslavia	79 m	85 m
N/A	26	Richard Bühler	Switzerland	83 m	82 m
N/A	27	Siegfried Kostner	Austria	89 m	85 m
N/A	28	Baier	West Germany	95 m	—
N/A	29	Janez Saksida	Yugoslavia	84 m	95 m
N/A	30	Erwin Steinegger	Austria	82 m	83 m
N/A	31	Albin Adlešič	Yugoslavia	84 m	88 m
N/A	32	Karl Holmström	Sweden	92 m	—
N/A	33	Thynes	Norway	88 m	96 m
N/A	34	Hemmo Silvennoinen	Finland	95.5 m	105 m
DNS	N/A	Josef Bradl	Austria	—	—

== Official results ==
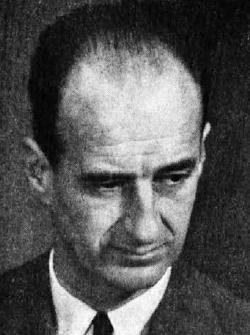
Bojan Adamič composed first "Fanfares"

«On 12 March 1954, at hill renovation official re-opening, on 11:15 AM local time, "Fanfares in Chords" instrumental was played for the first time, written especially for this occasion by Slovenian composer Bojan Adamič.»

— Slovenski poročevalec (13/3/1954)

13–14 March 1954 – Three rounds (2+1)

Rank	Name	Country	Points
1	Ossi Laaksonen	Finland	327.0
2	Jack Alfredsen	Norway	318.2
3	Hemmo Silvennoinen	Finland	315.0
4	Antti Hyvärinen	Finland	312.3
5	Sven Pettersson	Sweden	309.6
6	Simon Slåttvik	Norway	306.1
7	Max Bolkart	West Germany	305.6
8	Sverre Stallvik	Norway	304.7
9	Andreas Däscher	Switzerland	295.4
10	Otto Leodolter	Austria	295.0
11	Thynes	Norway	294.8
12	Walter Steinegger	Austria	292.7
13	Rudolf Dietrich	Austria	281.5
14	Aaro Pokka	Finland	281.0
15	Ferdi Kerber	Austria	280.0
16	Bine Rogelj	Norway	273.6
17	Rudi Finžgar	Yugoslavia	270.4
18	Bror Östman	Sweden	269.4
19	Jože Zidar	Yugoslavia	267.2
20	Hermann Anwander	West Germany	261.6
21	Erlandson	Sweden	261.3
22	Jože Langus	Yugoslavia	259.2
23	Janez Saksida	Yugoslavia	254.5
24	Monier	France	248.7
25	Albin Adlešič	Yugoslavia	237.7
26	Bläsl	Switzerland	237.5
27	Siegfried Kostner	Austria	236.9
28	Mato Krznarič	Yugoslavia	225.8
29	Régis Rey	France	225.2
30	Richard Rabasa	France	219.1
31	Bühler	West Germany	N/A
