= Bloudkova velikanka =

Ski jumping hill in Planica, Slovenia

Coordinates: 46°28′43.62″N 13°43′20″E

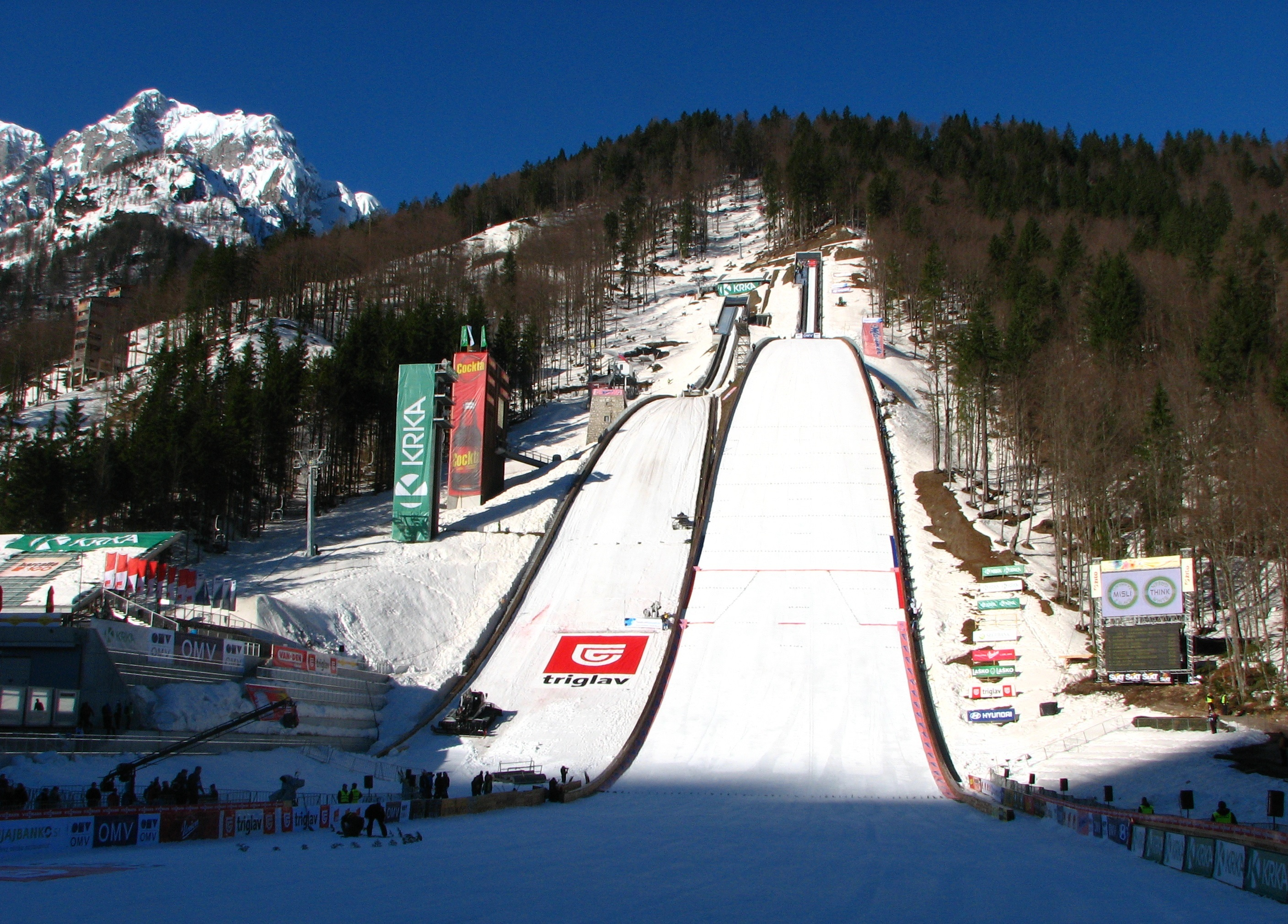
- Bloudkova velikanka (right hill) in 2014
- Constructor: Ivan Rožman (orig.); Stanko Bloudek (dev.); Klemen Kobal (new)
- Location: Planica, Slovenia
- Operator: ZŠRS Planica
- Opened: 4 February 1934 (orig.); 14 October 2012 (new)

Size
- K–point: 125 metres (410 ft)
- Hill size: 138 metres (453 ft)
- Hill record: New hill: 147 metres (482 ft); Jarl Magnus Riiber; Old hill: 147.5 metres (484 ft); Noriaki Kasai

Top events
- World Championships: 2023

Bloudkova velikanka ("Bloudek Giant"), also Bloudek-Rožmanova velikanka, is a large ski jumping hill in Planica, Slovenia, originally opened in 1934. In 2001, the hill collapsed and was completely rebuilt in 2012. A new normal hill (HS102) was also built next to Bloudkova velikanka in 2012, replacing the old K90 hill. A total of ten world records were set at the venue in the 1930s and 1940s.

The hill was originally constructed by Ivan Rožman, and was named after Stanko Bloudek. It was later renamed to Bloudek-Rožmanova velikanka in honour of Rožman. A year after opening, Bloudek became the main constructor, improving the hill until his death. In 1936, Josef Bradl became the first man in history to jump over 100 metres (330 ft).

The axis and the name of the hill are protected as a technical monument by the Slovenian Institute for Cultural Heritage, and cannot be changed due to the historical significance.

== History ==
Ski jumping in Planica began to develop when the village of Rateče received railway connections. The first K20 hill was built in 1930, located in the middle of the Planica-Rateče road, with some remains still visible today.

On 20 December 1931, the ski resort Dom Ilirija (now Dom Planica) opened at the initiative of Joso Gorec, who was at the time the General Secretary of the Yugoslav Winter Sports Association and a member of the Ilirija Ski Club Ljubljana. Next to the hotel, a swimming pool and tennis courts were built, as Gorec had a vision that Planica would become a modern Nordic ski resort in the future.

=== 1932–1934: Construction and opening ===
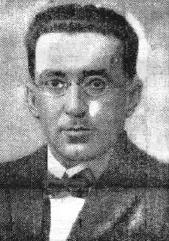
Stanko Bloudek

In 1932, Joso Gorec asked constructor Stanko Bloudek to construct a large hill, so he drew plans for the K80 hill, which was the largest size allowed by the International Ski Federation at the time. Bloudek found a suitable location and did a geodetic survey, started the construction, but soon ran out of money. Ivan Rožman, the owner of a construction company, immediately stepped in and drew plans for the K90 hill. Gorec decided to rather build a larger hill using Rožman's plans instead of Bloudek's plans, who was then left out.

In 1933, construction began and was completed in only two months, from October to December. Problems arose before construction started as local farmers from the Rateče area did not want to sell the land, but they eventually changed their minds and sold it.

On 4 February 1934, Bloudkova velikanka, constructed by Ivan Rožman, was officially opened with the Kingdom of Yugoslavia National Championships in front of 2,500 people. Franc Palme won the competition with 55 and 60 m (180 and 197 ft) and set the first two hill records and the national record at the same time.

On 25 March 1934, the first international competition was organised where Birger Ruud won the event in front of 4,000 people and also set the first world record in Planica with 92 metres (302 ft). There were also three invalid world record distances with touches or crashes: Birger Ruud at 87 metres (285 ft), Gregor Höll at 89 metres (292 ft), and Sigmund Ruud at 95 metres (312 ft).

=== 1935–1941: Hill expansion, naming arguments and world records ===
Bloudek returned to Planica and took control over the hill as a constructor/developer until his death in 1959. He constructed a new and larger K106 hill. The same year Rožman stepped out as an engineer in Planica. They argued over who was the original constructor and why the hill was not named after him. Rožman blamed Joso Gorec, who named the hill after his friend Bloudek, although Rožman was the original constructor. For years, there was a public misconception that Bloudek was the original hill constructor. Years later, the hill was renamed to Bloudek-Rožmanova velikanka.

On 17 March 1935 there was an international competition with over 12,000 visitors. During the competition, the world record was set by Stanisław Marusarz (95 metres) and Reidar Andersen (93 and 99 metres).

On 15 March 1936, Josef Bradl became the first man in history to have officially jumped over 100 metres, landing at 101.5 metres (333 ft). The distance had to be displayed as 101 metres on the scoreboard due to lack of space. Two years later, Josef Bradl won the Ski Flying Study competition with another world record at 107 metres (351 ft) with minor hill improvements.

On 2 March 1941, the last Ski Flying Study competition before the World War II outbreak in Yugoslavia was held, with 15,000 spectators in attendance.

After two scheduled rounds and Rudi Gering's world record distance at 108 metres (354 ft), the organizers wished to end the event due to safety concerns, but it continued on Germany's request. The fourth and final round had a series of long jumps: Heinz Palme reached 109 metres (358 ft), but a ground touch invalidated his world record distance. Then Gering set the world record at 118 metres (387 ft), winning the official afternoon competition. Right after him the rest jumped in that order: Hans Lahr (111 metres), Paul Krauß (112 m), and Franz Mair (109 m with fall).

=== 1947–2001: The last hill world record, World Cup, and collapse ===
On 24 March 1947, the first post-war competition was held. The winner of the Ski Flying Week was Rudi Finžgar, who also set a new national record of 102 metres (335 ft) during training.

Between 14 and 17 March 1948, there was a four-day international ski flying week competition in front of a total 20,000 spectators. Fritz Tschannen won the competition, and also set the last world record on the hill at 120 metres (390 ft). There were also two world record distance crashes by Janez Polda (120 metres) and Charles Blum (121 metres).

In 1954, the hill was renovated as a new concrete judge tower was built. In addition, the hill was expanded, received a new profile, and was reopened and back in use for the Planica's Ski Flying week in March 1954.

In 1980, Bloudkova velikanka hosted the first FIS Ski Jumping World Cup event. The hill became a standard and regular host of World Cup events until 1998. Since 1998, all Planica events were held on the ski flying hill (Letalnica bratov Gorišek).

The hill was in use until 16 December 2001, when the upper part of the concrete foundation collapsed during snowmaking. In the same year, the last international competition on the old hill was held. For many years after the collapse of the hill, there were plans to rebuild it. A decade later, in July 2011, they demolished the inrun, the judge tower and the television tower, but left the "German tower" which is part of the Slovenian culture heritage. The last construction point of the old hill was at K130 and the last hill size at HS140.

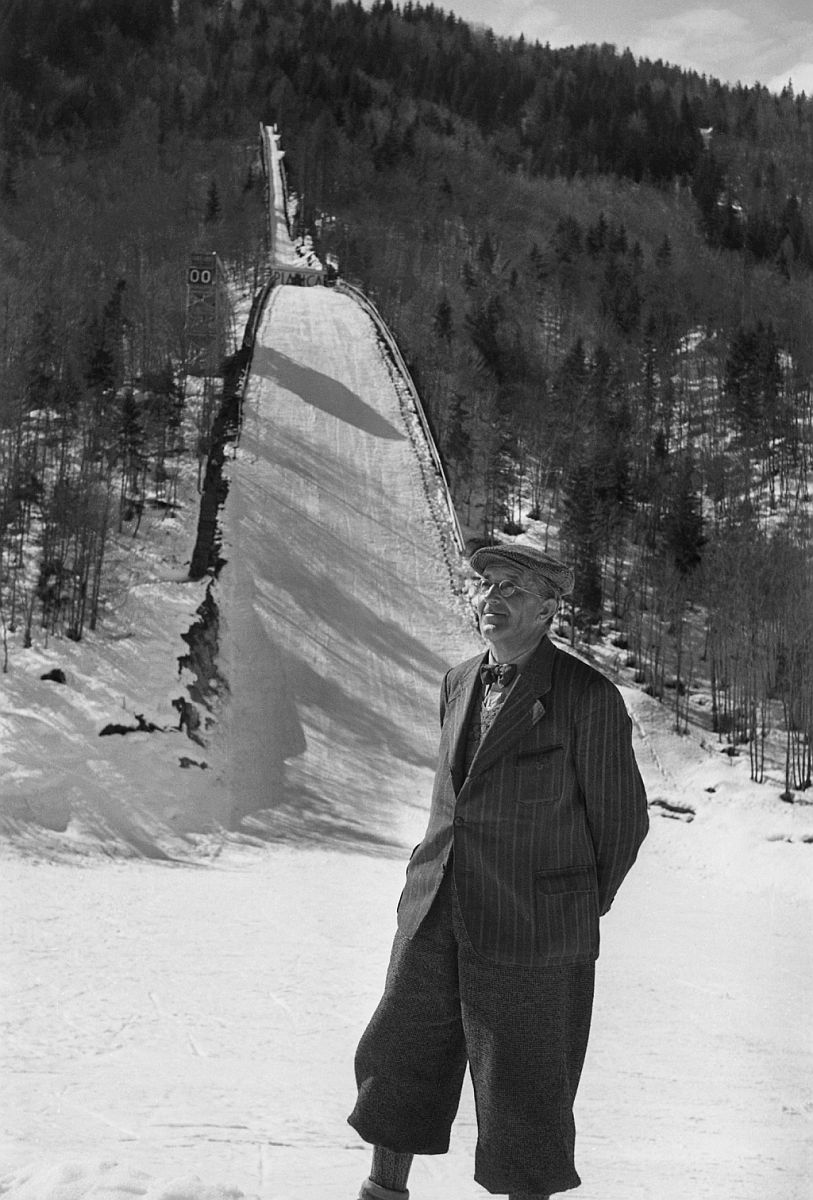
Stanko Bloudek at the foot of the hill at the 1947 competition

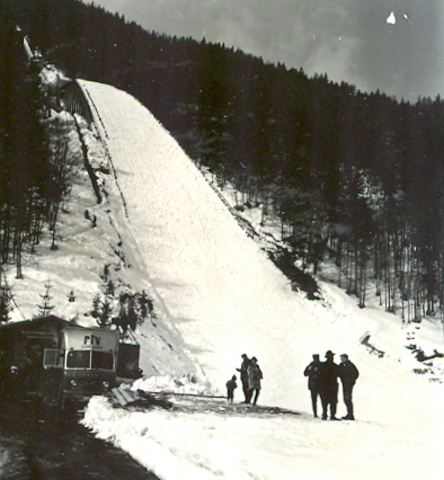
Old hill in 1963

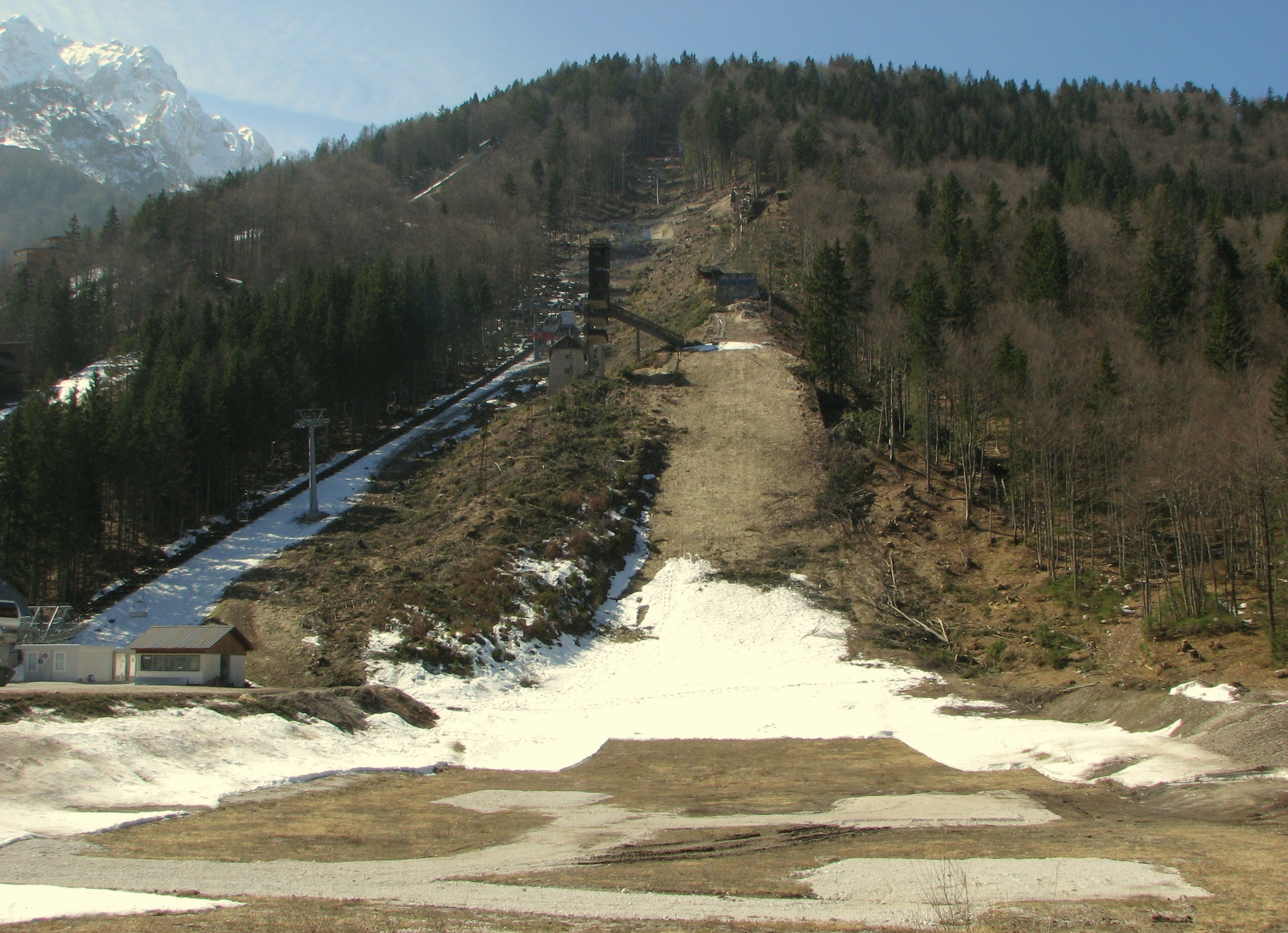
Old hill after the 2001 collapse

=== 2011–present: Reconstruction ===
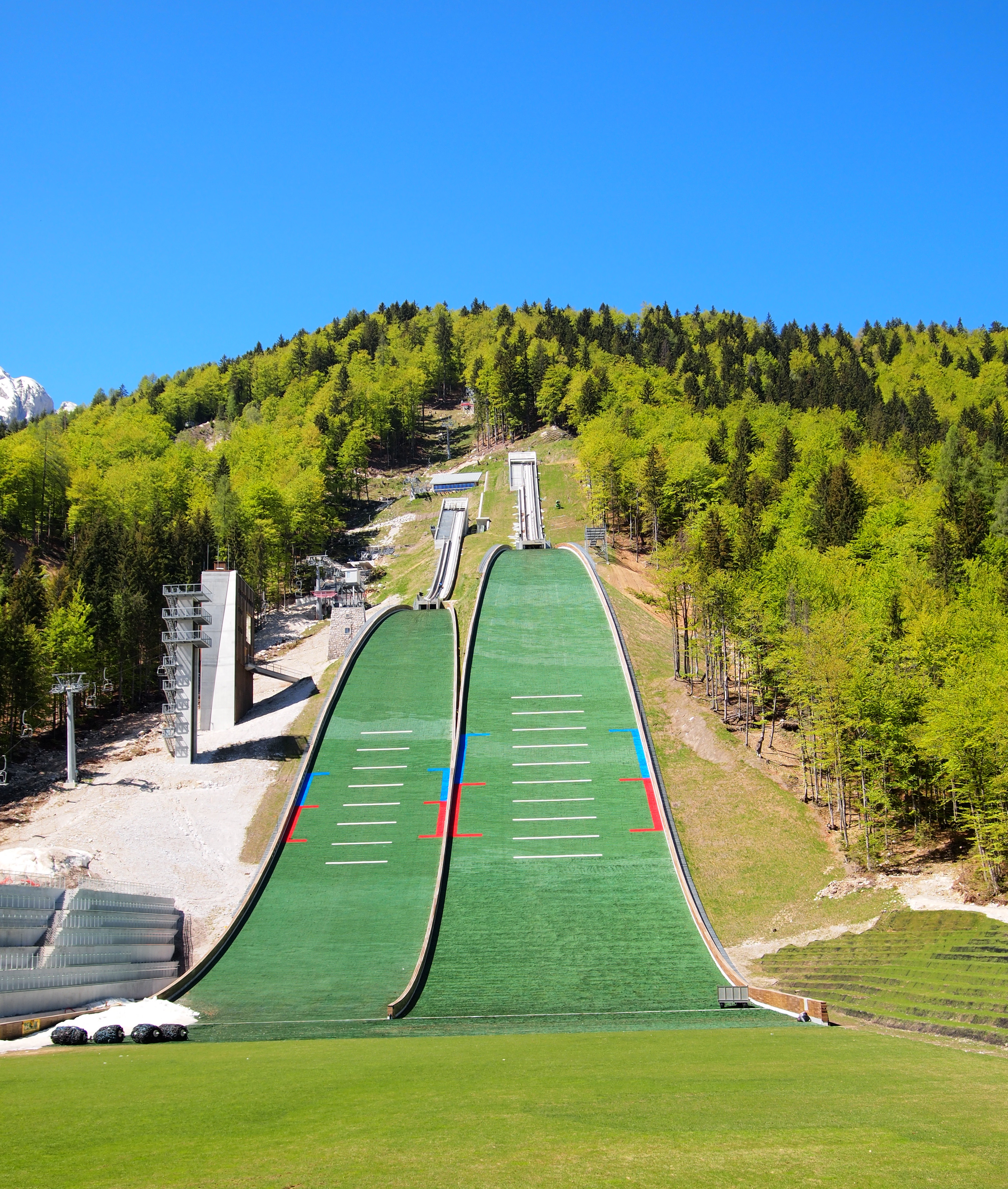
Reconstructed hill in 2014

In July 2011, the Slovenian government and the Planica Nordic Centre signed a contract for the complete renovation of the hill, worth €6.2 million. At the same location where the original large hill was standing, which is also part of the Slovenian culture heritage, they rebuilt the hill at the hill size of 139 metres with a new profile, inrun, and judge and television towers. Right next to the large hill they built a new normal hill with the hill size of 104 metres. Both hills were designed by Slovenian architects Matej Blenkuš, Miloš Florijančič and Klemen Kobal. The hills were opened on 14 October 2012 with the national championships.

The first person who jumped on the new HS139 hill was Aleš Hlebanja. He received this honour because his grandmother was the first to sell a private property around the hill, which was needed for the construction of the Planica Nordic Centre. Primož Peterka was honoured with an inaugural jump on the new HS104 hill. In 2014, Bloudkova velikanka hosted the World Cup event for the first time since 1998, because the main ski flying hill was closed at the time due to major renovations.

== Events ==
=== Men's ski jumping ===
Year	Date	Hill size	Event	Winner	Second place	Third place
1934	4 February	K90	KYNC	(Kingdom of Yugoslavia) Franc Palme	(Kingdom of Yugoslavia) Bogo Šramel	(Kingdom of Yugoslavia) Gregor Klančnik
1934	25 March	K90	International	(Norway) Birger Ruud	(Norway) Sigmund Ruud	(Austria) Gregor Höll
1935	17 March	K106	International	(Poland) Stanisław Marusarz	(Czechoslovakia) Antonín Bartoň	(Switzerland) Marcel Reymond
1936	15 March	K106	International	(Austria) Josef Bradl	(Austria) Gregor Höll	(Austria) Rudolf Rieger
1938	16 March	K106	Study Flying	(Austria) Josef Bradl	(Nazi Germany) Hans Wiedemann	(Austria) Walter Delle Karth
1940	10 March	K120	Study Flying	(Nazi Germany) Gregor Höll	(Nazi Germany) Josef Bradl	(Nazi Germany) Gustl Berauer
1941	2 March	K120	Study Flying	(Nazi Germany) Rudi Gering	(Nazi Germany) Paul Krauß	(Nazi Germany) Hans Lahr
1947	24 March	K120	Study Flying	(Socialist Federal Republic of Yugoslavia) Rudi Finžgar	(Switzerland) Charles Blum	(Switzerland) Fritz Tschannen
1948	17 March	K120	ISFW	(Switzerland) Fritz Tschannen	(Switzerland) Hans Zurbriggen	(Switzerland) Charles Blum
1950	15–17 March	K120	ISFS	(Socialist Federal Republic of Yugoslavia) Janez Polda	(Socialist Federal Republic of Yugoslavia) Rudi Finžgar	(Norway) Sverre Kronvold
1950	19 March	K120	Exhibition	(Socialist Federal Republic of Yugoslavia) Rudi Finžgar	(Norway) Slattsveen	(Socialist Federal Republic of Yugoslavia) Janez Polda
1954	13–14 March	K120	ISFW	(Finland) Ossi Laaksonen	(Norway) Jack Alfredsen	(Finland) Hemmo Silvennoinen
1957	9–10 March	K125	ISFW	(East Germany) Helmut Recknagel	(Finland) Eino Kirjonen	(Finland) Pekka Tirkkonen
1960	26–27 March	K120	ISFW	(East Germany) Helmut Recknagel	(Norway) Arne Larsen	(Finland) Raimo Vitikainen
1963	22–24 March	K120	KOP	(East Germany) Dieter Bokeloh	(East Germany) Dietmar Klemm	(East Germany) Veit Kührt
1966	25–27 March	K120	ISFW	(Czechoslovakia) Jiří Raška	(Soviet Union) Mihail Veretennikov	(East Germany) Dieter Neuendorf
1968	24 March	K120	3rd Memorial	(Czechoslovakia) Jiří Raška	(Czechoslovakia) Josef Matouš	(Austria) Willi Schuster
1973	25 March	K120	6th Memorial	(Switzerland) Walter Steiner	(East Germany) Heinz Wosipiwo	(Czechoslovakia) Josef Matouš
1975	12 April	K120	Kongsberg	(Austria) Toni Innauer	(Austria) Rudi Wanner	(Socialist Federal Republic of Yugoslavia) Janez Loštrek
1975	13 April	K120	7th Memorial	(Austria) Willi Pürstl	(Socialist Federal Republic of Yugoslavia) Bogdan Norčič	(Austria) Rudi Wanner
1976	20 March	K120	Kongsberg	(Austria) Hans Wallner	(Socialist Federal Republic of Yugoslavia) Bogdan Norčič	(Germany) Peter Leitner
1976	21 March	K120	8th Memorial	Cancelled after 14 competitors due to strong wind		
1978	19 March	K120	9th Memorial	(Austria) Reinhold Bachler	(Socialist Federal Republic of Yugoslavia) Bogdan Norčič	(Socialist Federal Republic of Yugoslavia) Marko Mlakar
1980	22 March	K120	World Cup	(Austria) Hubert Neuper	(Austria) Armin Kogler	(Austria) Hans Millonig
1981	22 March	K120	World Cup	(Norway) Dag Holmen-Jensen	(Austria) Armin Kogler	(Austria) Alfred Groyer
1982	28 March	K120	World Cup	(Norway) Ole Bremseth	(Austria) Hubert Neuper	(Italy) Massimo Rigoni
1983	27 March	K120	World Cup	(Socialist Federal Republic of Yugoslavia) Primož Ulaga	(Canada) Horst Bulau	(Austria) Richard Schallert
1984	25 March	K120	World Cup	(Czechoslovakia) Pavel Ploc	(Norway) Vegard Opaas	(Poland) Piotr Fijas
1986	23 March	K120	World Cup	(Austria) Ernst Vettori	(Austria) Andreas Felder	(Finland) Matti Nykänen
1988	27 March	K120	World Cup	(Socialist Federal Republic of Yugoslavia) Primož Ulaga	(Socialist Federal Republic of Yugoslavia) Rajko Lotrič	(France) Didier Mollard
1989	26 March	K120	World Cup	(East Germany) Jens Weißflog	(Norway) Kent Johanssen	(Austria) Andreas Felder
1990	24 March	K120	World Cup	(Italy) Roberto Cecon	(Finland) Ari-Pekka Nikkola	(East Germany) Jens Weißflog
1990	25 March	K120	World Cup	(Finland) Ari-Pekka Nikkola	(Germany) Dieter Thoma	(Socialist Federal Republic of Yugoslavia) Primož Ulaga
1992	28 March	K120	World Cup; Team event	Austria	Germany	Finland
1992	29 March	K120	World Cup	(Austria) Andreas Felder	(Austria) Heinz Kuttin	(Finland) Toni Nieminen
1993	27 March	K120	World Cup; Team event	Japan	Norway	Slovenia
1993	28 March	K120	World Cup	(Norway) Espen Bredesen	(Austria) Andreas Felder	(Germany) Christof Duffner
1993	12 December	K120	World Cup	(Germany) Jens Weißflog	(Austria) Andreas Goldberger	(Norway) Espen Bredesen
1995	9 December	K120	World Cup; Team event	Finland	Japan	Norway
1995	10 December	K120	World Cup	(Finland) Mika Laitinen	(Norway) Roar Ljøkelsøy	(Finland) Janne Ahonen
1996	24 March	K120	Exhibition	(Slovenia) Primož Peterka	(Austria) Andreas Goldberger	(Slovenia) Samo Gostiša
1998	21 March	K120	World Cup	(Japan) Kazuyoshi Funaki	(Slovenia) Primož Peterka	(Japan) Hiroya Saito
1998	22 March	K120	World Cup	(Japan) Noriaki Kasai	(Japan) Hiroya Saito	(Austria) Martin Höllwarth
New hill
2014	21 March	HS139	World Cup	(Germany) Severin Freund	(Norway) Anders Bardal	(Slovenia) Peter Prevc
2014	22 March	HS139	World Cup; Team event	Austria	Poland	Norway
2014	23 March	HS139	World Cup	(Slovenia) Peter Prevc	(Germany) Severin Freund	(Norway) Anders Bardal
2023	3 March	HS138	NWSC	(Slovenia) Timi Zajc	(Japan) Ryōyū Kobayashi	(Poland) Dawid Kubacki
2023	4 March	HS138	NWSC; Team event	Slovenia	Norway	Austria

=== Women's ski jumping ===
Year	Date	Hill size	Event	Winner	Second place	Third place
2014	22 March	HS139	World Cup	(Japan) Sara Takanashi	(Japan) Yuki Ito	(France) Julia Clair
2023	1 March	HS138	NWSC	(Canada) Alexandria Loutitt	(Norway) Maren Lundby	(Germany) Katharina Althaus

== List of world records ==
A total of ten official world records have been set at the hill.

No.	Date	Athlete	Length
36	25 March 1934	(Norway) Birger Ruud	92 metres (302 ft)
37	14 March 1935	(Norway) Reidar Andersen	93 metres (305 ft)
38	15 March 1935	(Poland) Stanisław Marusarz	95 metres (312 ft)
39	15 March 1935	(Norway) Reidar Andersen	99 metres (325 ft)
40	15 March 1935	(Norway) Reidar Andersen	99 metres (325 ft)
42	15 March 1936	(Austria) Josef Bradl	101.5 metres (333 ft)
43	15 March 1938	(Austria) Josef Bradl	107 metres (351 ft)
44	2 March 1941	(Nazi Germany) Rudi Gering	108 metres (354 ft)
45	2 March 1941	(Nazi Germany) Rudi Gering	118 metres (387 ft)
46	15 March 1948	(Switzerland) Fritz Tschannen	120 metres (390 ft)

== Srednja skakalnica (HS102) ==
Srednja skakalnica
- Constructor: Klemen Kobal
- Opened: 14 October 2012

Size
- K–point: 95 metres (312 ft)
- Hill size: 102 metres (335 ft)
- Hill record: 105 metres (344 ft) (Poland) Piotr Żyła (25 February 2023)

Top events
- World Championships: 2023

Srednja skakalnica (literally "Normal hill") is a HS102 normal hill, designed by Klemen Kobal.

It was built in 2012 next to Bloudkova velikanka and replaced the old Srednja Bloudkova K90 hill, which was in use until 2011. It is called simply "Normal hill" because the axis and the name of Bloudkova velikanka are protected as monuments and cannot be altered or used in other structures.

The hill was built as an accompanying facility to meet international standards for the organization of the FIS Nordic World Ski Championships, for which Planica unsuccessfully applied three times in a row (2017, 2019 and 2021) before finally hosting it in 2023.

In 2024, it hosted the 47th Nordic Junior World Ski Championships and the women's World Cup final.

=== Official hill record ===
Event	Date	Athlete	Length
↓ Men ↓
NWSC	25 February 2023	(Poland) Piotr Żyła	105 metres (344 ft)
↓ Women ↓
WC	21 March 2024	(Austria) Eva Pinkelnig	103.5 metres (340 ft)

=== Women's ski jumping ===
Year	Date	Hill size	Event	Winner	Second place	Third place
2014	25 January	HS104	World Cup	(Austria) Daniela Iraschko-Stolz	(Japan) Sara Takanashi	(Germany) Carina Vogt
2014	26 January	HS104	World Cup	(Austria) Daniela Iraschko-Stolz	(Japan) Sara Takanashi	(Germany) Carina Vogt
2023	23 February	HS102	NWSC	(Germany) Katharina Althaus	(Austria) Eva Pinkelnig	(Norway) Anna Odine Strøm
2023	25 February	HS102	NWSC; Team event	Germany	Austria	Norway
2024	21 March	HS102	World Cup	(Austria) Eva Pinkelnig	(Canada) Alexandria Loutitt	(Slovenia) Nika Prevc

=== Men's ski jumping ===
Year	Date	Hill size	Event	Winner	Second place	Third place
2023	25 February	HS102	NWSC	(Poland) Piotr Żyła	(Germany) Andreas Wellinger	(Germany) Karl Geiger

=== Mixed team ski jumping ===
Year	Date	Hill size	Event	Winner	Second place	Third place
2023	26 February	HS102	NWSC; Mixed team	Germany	Norway	Slovenia

== See also ==
- Letalnica bratov Gorišek
- Planica Nordic Centre
- Srednja Bloudkova
