= Planica 1938 =

Coordinates: 46°28′43″N 13°43′16″E

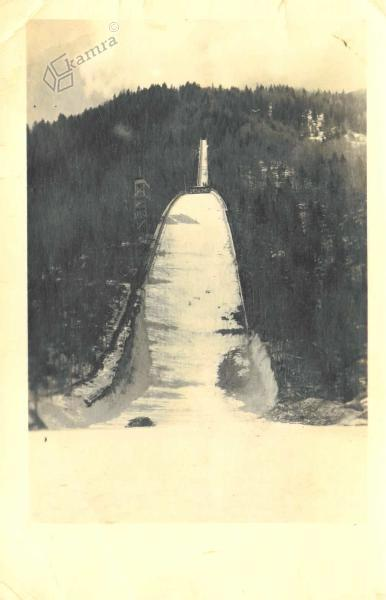
- Host city: Planica, Kingdom of Yugoslavia
- Sport: Ski flying
- Events: Ski Flying Study Week
- Main venue: Bloudkova velikanka K106

Planica 1938 was a ski flying study week, allowed only in study purposes, with main competition held on 16 March 1938 in Planica, Drava Banovina, Kingdom of Yugoslavia.

== Schedule ==
Date	Event	Rounds	Longest jump of the day	Visitors
15 March 1938	Official training	4	107 metres (351 ft) by Josef Bradl	N/A
16 March 1938	Competition	5	104 metres (341 ft) by Josef Bradl	N/A

== Competition ==
On 15 March 1938, official training day was held with five competitors from three countries: Austria, Yugoslavia and Nazi Germany. Josef Bradl set another world record in last 4th round at 107 metres (351 ft).

On 16 March 1938, ski flying study competition was on schedule with only four jumpers on start, each with five jumps. After two years, Josef Bradl won the competition again. Novšak didn't jump due to injury.

=== Official training ===
15 March 1938 – 14:00 PM – chronological order not available

Bib	Name	Country	Round 1	Round 2	Round 3	Round 4
N/A	Hans Wiedemann	Nazi Germany	84 m	96 m	—	—
N/A	Paul Schneidenbach	Nazi Germany	62 m	75 m	—	—
N/A	Walter Delle Karth	Austria	72 m	81 m	—	—
N/A	Albin Novšak	Kingdom of Yugoslavia	72 m	79 m	85 m	—
N/A	Josef Bradl	Austria	83 m	95 m	100 m	107 m

World record!
Fall or touch!

== Official results ==
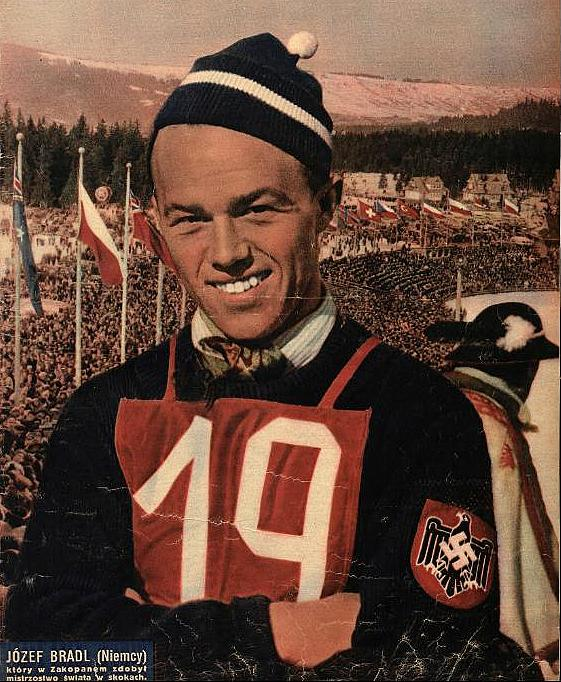
Josef Bradl won second time in Planica and set second WR

=== Ski Flying Study competition ===
16 March 1938 – Five rounds – the best jump counted

Rank	Name	Round 1	Round 2	Round 3	Round 4	Round 5
1	(Austria) Josef Bradl	90 m	98 m	102 m	100 m	104 m
2	(Nazi Germany) Hans Wiedemann	84 m	95 m	98 m	95 m	99 m
3	(Austria) Walter Delle Karth	77 m	80 m	88 m	90 m	89 m
4	(Nazi Germany) Paul Schneidenbach	75 m	80 m	80 m	80 m	89 m

== Ski flying world record ==
Date	Name	Country	Metres	Feet
15 March 1938	Josef Bradl	Austria	107	351

== Note ==
On 12 March 1938, just a couple of days before the competition, Austria was officially annexed and joined with Nazi Germany. However, both Austrian ski jumpers (Josef Bradl, Walter Delle Karth) still performed under the flag of Austria.
