= Ulland =

Ulland is a surname. Notable people with the surname include:

- James E. Ulland (1942–2024), American politician
- Olav Ulland (1910–2003), Norwegian ski jumper

== See also ==
- Ulland Andersen, multiple people
