= Trampolino Gigante Corno d'Aola =

Abandoned ski jumping hill in Italy

Trampolino Gigante Corno d’Aola Trampolino del Littorio
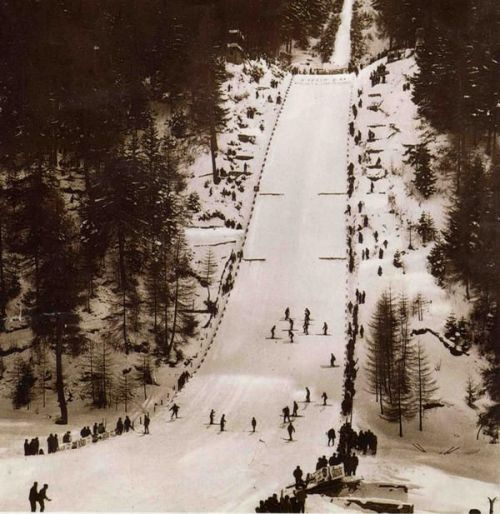
- Constructor: Adolf Badrutt
- Location: Ponte di Legno, Italy
- Opened: 24 February 1929
- Closed: 14 February 1966

Size
- K–point: K90
- Hill record: 110.5 m (363 ft); Bruno Da Col (16 February 1949); Henrik Ohlmeyer (14 February 1966)

Trampolino Gigante Corno d'Aola (Italian: Trampolino del Littorio) is an abandoned K90 ski jumping hill in Ponte di Legno, Italy opened in 1929.

== History ==
In 1928, hill located at 1258 meters above sea and designed by Adolf Badrutt, a Swiss ski jumper and world record holder, in the last town of the Val Camonica valley was completed.

On 24 February 1929, hill was officially opened in front of 20,000 spectators by Edda Mussolini, daughther of Italian prime minister Benito Mussolini. The participants had exceptional prizes, given the period, this was possible thanks to the sponsors of that time: large companies and paramilitary organizations.

On 16 February 1930, Ernesto Zardini from Kingdom of Italy fell at world record distance at 76 metres (249 feet).

In 1931, late January or early February, Polish ski jumper Bronisław Czech fell at 79.5 metres (261 ft) world record distance, although some judges recognized it as official, never internationally recognized.

On 17 March 1935, Swiss Fritz Kainersdörfer jumped 99.5 meters (326 ft) and set the only official world record on this hill. Later that day history was made, when Olav Ulland from Norway fell at 103.5 metres (340 ft) and became first man ever to beat one hundred meter mark in ski jumping, although it was invalid and didn't count as he should be standing for record to be officially recognized.

In March 1936, shortly after Bradl's historic WR jump, Bruno Da Col jumped 100.5 metres and set first ever jump in Italy over hundred meters for which he received a golden medal of honour by Benito Mussolini.

The hill attracted many visitors each year from all over Europe. After the war, when it was enlarged and renamed as Gigante (Giant), interest for this sport in Italy rapidly diminished.

On 16 February 1949, at the Italian National Championships, Bruno Da Col set the all-time official hill record at 110.5 metres (363 feet), tied years later at the last hill competition.

On 14 February 1966 hill hosted the last competition, famous Kongsberg Cup, where an official hill record was set and tied by West German Henrik Ohlmeyer who jumped 110.5 meters (363 ft). Italian ski jumper Giacomo Aimoni claimed that he jumped 114 meters (374 ft) at training, but this jump was never officially recognized as hill record.

== Ski jumping world records ==
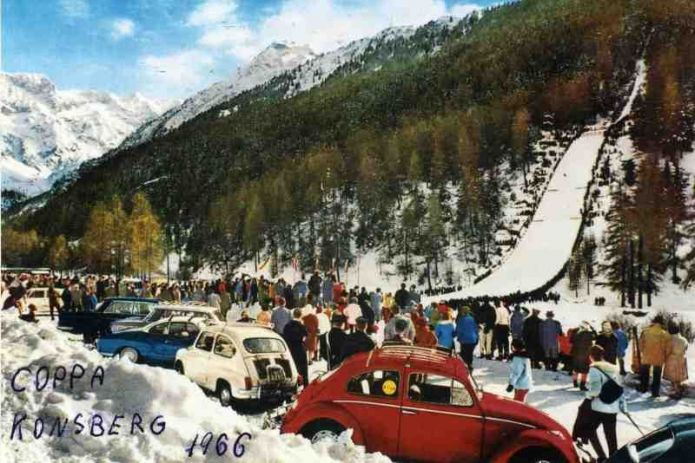
Kongsberg Cup 1966 (last competition)

The first jump in history over 100 meters (although with fall) was set by Olav Ulland here in 1935.

No.	Date	Name	Country	Metres	Feet
F	16 February 1930	Ernesto Zardini	Kingdom of Italy	76	249
F	January 1931; February 1931	Bronisław Czech	Poland	79.5	261
#41	17 March 1935	Fritz Kainersdörfer	Switzerland	99.5	326
F	17 March 1935	Olav Ulland	Norway; United States	103.5	340

Not recognized! Fall at world record distance.
