= Stanko Bloudek =

Slovenian sportsman, designer, and builder

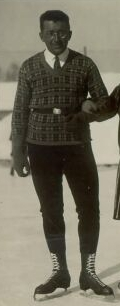
Stanko Bloudek

Stanko Bloudek (11 February 1890 – 26 November 1959) was a Slovenian aeroplane and automobile designer, a sportsman and a sport inventor, designer, builder and educator.

== Biography ==
Stanko Bloudek was born on 11 February 1890 as son of a Czech father and a Slovenian mother in the Slovenian mining town of Idrija. He attended school in Most (in today's Czech Republic), where his father worked in the local mining industry. After graduating from secondary school in 1908, Bloudek studied in Prague. At first, he studied at the Academy of Arts, but found it was not his interest and switched to technical studies. He never graduated from the academy, but was nonetheless regarded as an engineer.

Bloudek was engaged as a pioneer of flight. In 1910, when in Prague, he presented his first monoplane called Racek ('Gull'). A second one named Libela ('dragonfly') followed in the next year. For some time he worked together with Igo Etrich, inventor of the Etrich Taube. Before World War I, he was employed in Trutnov, today in the Czech Republic. At that time, he became interested in skiing. After the end of World War I, Bloudek moved to his mother's home in Ljubljana, and he lived in Ljubljana until his death. There he was also busy in developing flight, and he also showed interest in improving cars. In the 1920s, he and the Ljubljana Aeroclub constructed another monoplane, named Sraka ('Magpie'), and then a two-seat aircraft, named Bloudek XV (nicknamed Lojze). He ceased his work in 1934, when a test pilot of his plane, Janez Colnar, died during an airshow in Zagreb. In the 1930s, Bloudek designed the first Slovenian car, Triglav, which was produced in 1934 by the Automontaža company, where he was the main constructor until World War II.

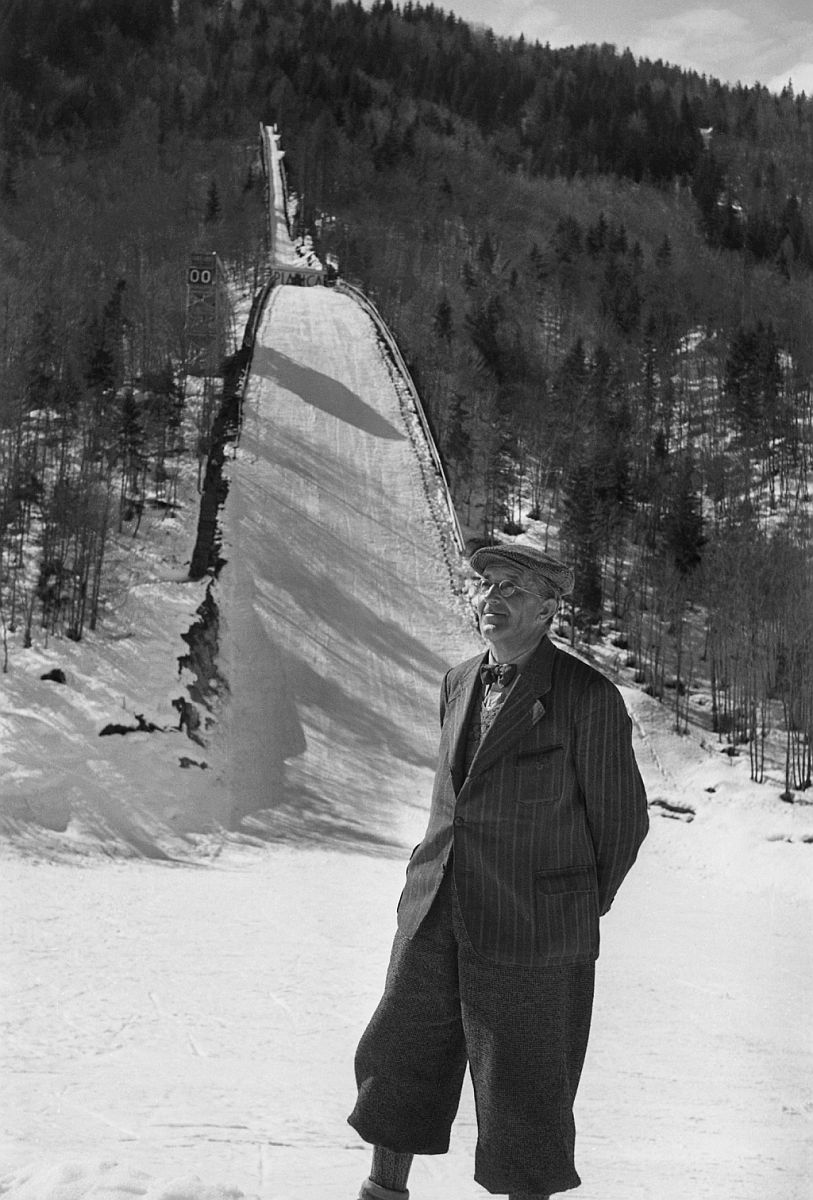
Stanko Bloudek at the foot of the Bloudek Giant in 1947

Bloudek was also an active sportsman. In 1928, he became a member of the Olympic team for the Winter Games in Sankt Moritz as a figure skater, but finally did not compete in the competition. In 1929, he became the Slovene champion in the discus throw, after he threw it 29.95 metres (98.3 ft). As an engineer, Bloudek was also engaged in building sports facilities. Based on his plans, the Bloudek Giant, the ski jumping hill in Planica, was built in 1934. There the first jump over 100 m was achieved in 1936 by the Austrian Sepp Bradl. At the time, this was the biggest jumping hill in the world, sometimes called "the mother of all jumping hills". Another ski jumping hill based on plans by Bloudek was built in the Šiška District of Ljubljana in 1954 and existed until 1976. International competitions for the Kongsberg Cup were organised there, attended by thousands of spectators. In Ljubljana, he also built and sometimes financed a number of other objects: the first modern football court, the first Olympic-size swimming pool in Yugoslavia (1929), tennis courts, the first skating ring in Slovenia (at Čufar Street, Čufarjeva ulica), and other structures.

Bloudek was also active in sports administration. In 1909, he participated in the establishing the football clubs Hermes and Ilirija. In 1919, he participated in founding the Yugoslav Olympic Committee. He was a great friend of Rudolf Cvetko, the first Slovene Olympic medalist, after he helped him keep his job and in promoting fencing in Ljubljana. From 1947 until 1951, he was the president of the Yugoslav Olympic Committee. In 1948, Bloudek became a member of the International Olympic Committee (IOC). He was the only Slovene to even be a member of the IOC. During World War II, he heavily financed the Liberation Front of the Slovene Nation and was imprisoned for this in 1942 and 1945. in 1958, he became the first honorary member of the Slovenian Football Association and in the following year led the renovation of the Bežigrad Stadium. He died on 26 November 1959 while writing a letter regarding the construction of ski jumping hills across Yugoslavia.

== Commemoration ==
To honour his achievements, a bust of Stanko Bloudek was created by Stojan Batič and erected in Tivoli Park in Ljubljana in 1969. It was stolen in 2008. Finally, the most prestigious Slovenian Sports Award, the Bloudek Award, was named after the "father of Slovenian winter sports".

Preceded by Stefan Hadži	President of the Yugoslav Olympic Committee; 1948–1950	Succeeded by Dušan Korać
