= Bronisław Czech =

Polish sportsman and artist

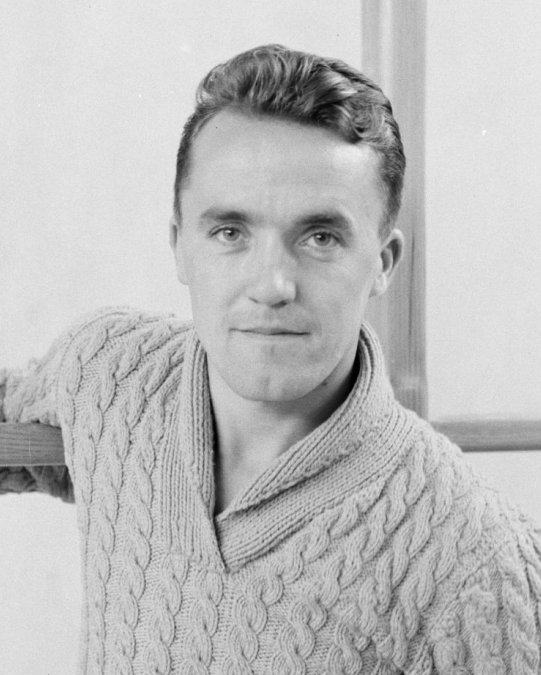
- Photo from 1934

Personal information
- Nationality: Poland
- Born: 25 July 1908 Zakopane, Kingdom of Galicia and Lodomeria, Austria-Hungary
- Died: 4 June 1944 (aged 35) Auschwitz-Birkenau, German-occupied Poland

Sport
- Sport: Skiing

Achievements and titles
- Personal bests: 79.5 m (261 ft); Ponte di Legno, Kin. of Italy (1931)

Bronisław "Bronek" Czech (Polish pronunciation: [brɔˈɲiswaf ˈtʂɛx]; 25 July 1908 – 4 June 1944) was a Polish sportsman and artist. A gifted skier, he won championships of Poland 24 times in various skiing disciplines, including Alpine skiing, Nordic skiing and ski jumping. A member of the Polish national team at three consecutive Winter Olympics, he was also one of the pioneers of mountain rescue in the Tatra Mountains and a glider instructor. He was murdered in the Auschwitz concentration camp.

== Biography ==
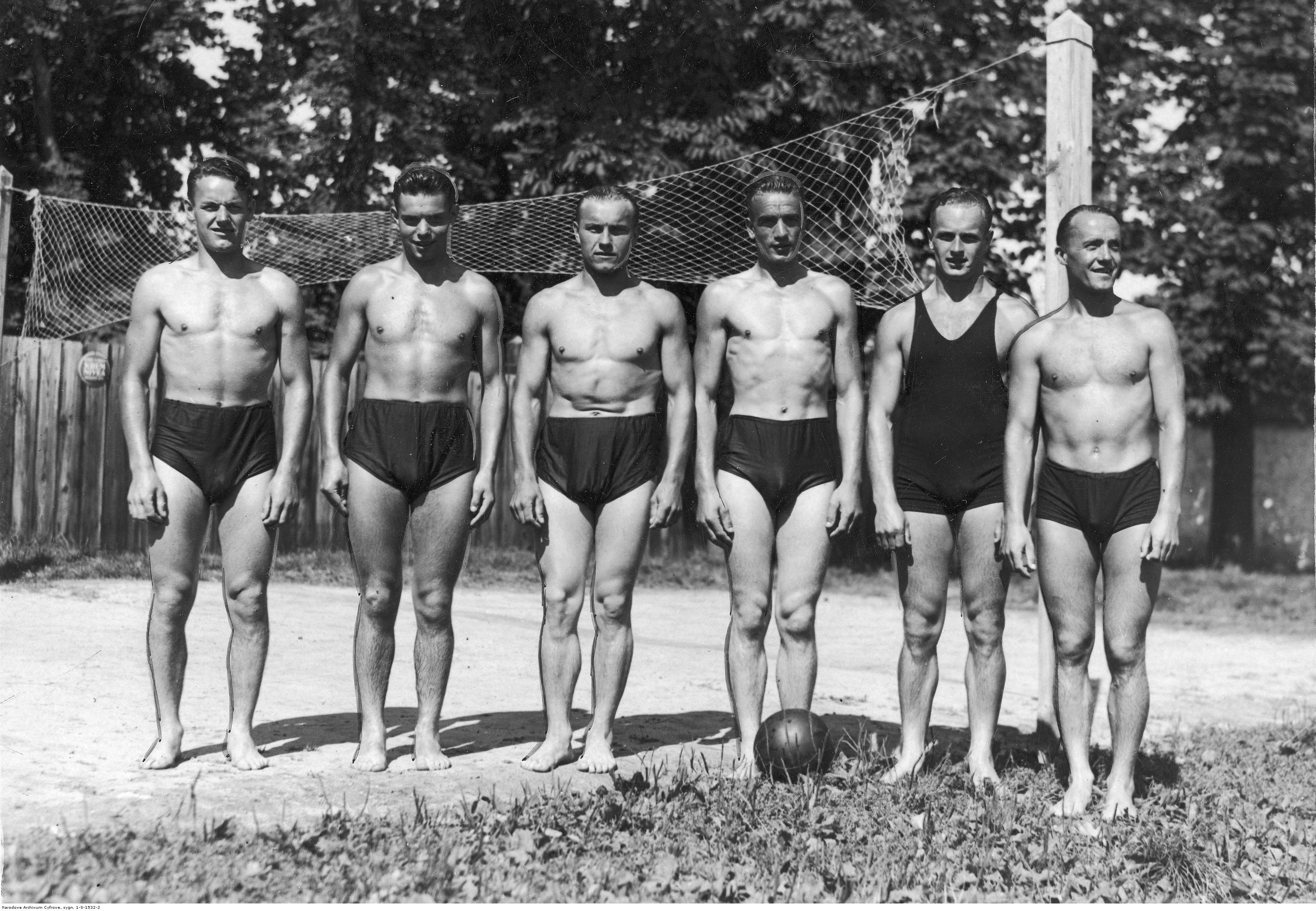
The 1936 Polish Winter Olympic Team. Standing from the right: Bronisław Czech, Marian Orlewicz, Michał Górski, Stanisław Karpiel, Jan Bochenek, and Andrzej Marusarz

Czech was born on 25 July 1908 in Zakopane, then in Austro-Hungarian Galicia. His parents were Józef Czech and Stanisława née Namysłowska. There he attended local public school and a private gymnasium, but in the end he finished only three classes of a local wood industry school (in 1927). The same year he joined the SN PTT-1907 Klub Sportowy Kemping Zakopane. In late 1920s he moved to Warsaw, where he graduated from the Central Institute of Physical Education. This gave him the diploma of a professional gymnastics teacher and a skiing instructor.

He was 24 times Polish champion in different ski competitions and took part in the Winter Olympics of 1928, 1932 and 1936. He finished 10th in the Nordic combined and 37th in the ski jumping at the 1928 Winter Olympics in St. Moritz. Four years later, at the 1932 Winter Olympics held in Lake Placid, New York, Czech was 7th in the Nordic combined, 12th in ski jumping and 18th in the 18 km cross-country event. At his final Olympics of 1936 in Garmisch-Partenkirchen he finished 16. in the Nordic combined, 20th in Alpine skiing, 33rd in both ski jumping and the 18 km cross-country event, and 7th in the 4 x 10 km cross-country relay.

During the Second World War he was a soldier of Polish Underground (Home Army) and courier from occupied Poland to the West. He was captured by Germans, imprisoned and murdered in the German concentration camp Auschwitz. Some of his paintings are preserved in the concentration camp's museum.

== Invalid ski jumping world record ==
Date	Hill	Location	Metres	Feet
1931	Trampolino Gigante Corno d’Aola	Ponte di Legno, Kingdom of Italy	79.5	261

Not recognized! Crashed shortly after standing at world record distance, although judges recognized it.

== Bronisław Czech in literature ==
1. The Hamsa by E.S. Kraay, ISBN 1451518412

== See also ==
- List of Nazi-German concentration camps
- The Holocaust in Poland
- World War II casualties of Poland

Olympic Games
Preceded by Józef Stogowski	Flagbearer for Poland; Garmisch-Partenkirchen 1936	Succeeded by Stanisław Marusarz
