= Reidar Andersen =

Norwegian ski jumper

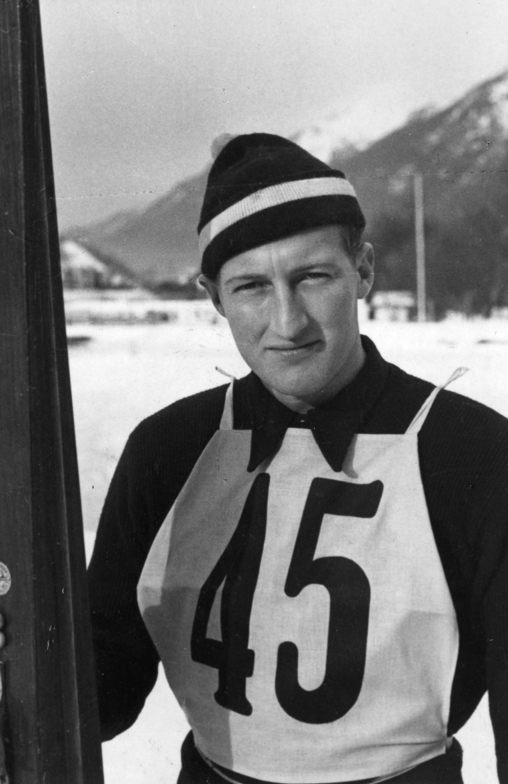
- Photo of Reidar Andersen in 1936

Personal information
- Nationality: Norway
- Born: 20 April 1911 Ringerike, Norway
- Died: 15 December 1991 (aged 80) Oslo, Norway

Sport
- Sport: Skiing

Achievements and titles
- Personal bests: 99 m (325 ft); Planica, King. of Yugoslavia (15 March 1935)
Medal record
Men's ski jumping
Olympic Games
Bronze medal – third place	1936 Garmisch-Pa	Individual LH
World Championships
Silver medal – second place	1930 Oslo	Individual LH
Silver medal – second place	1935 Vysoké Tatry	Individual LH
Silver medal – second place	1937 Chamonix	Individual LH
Bronze medal – third place	1936 Garmisch-Pa	Individual LH

Reidar Andersen (20 April 1911 – 15 December 1991) was a Norwegian ski jumper who competed in the 1930s.

== Career ==
He won a ski jumping bronze at the 1936 Winter Olympics in Garmisch-Partenkirchen. In addition, he won ski jumping silver medals at the 1930, 1935, and 1937 FIS Nordic World Ski Championships.

On 14 and 15 March 1935 he set a total of three world records (93, 98 and 99 metres) on Bloudkova velikanka hill in Planica, Kingdom of Yugoslavia.

Andersen won the Holmenkollen ski festival's men's ski jumping competition in 1936, 1937, and 1938, the only person to ever win this event three straight years.

In 1938, Andersen shared the Holmenkollen medal with fellow Norwegian Johan R. Henriksen.

== Ski jumping world records ==
Date	Hill	Location	Metres	Feet
14 March 1935	Bloudkova velikanka K106	Planica, Kingdom of Yugoslavia	93	305
15 March 1935	Bloudkova velikanka K106	Planica, Kingdom of Yugoslavia	98	322
15 March 1935	Bloudkova velikanka K106	Planica, Kingdom of Yugoslavia	99	325
