= Johan R. Henriksen =

Norwegian Nordic skier

Johan R. Henriksen (8 November 1886 – 30 September 1975) is a Norwegian Nordic skier who was awarded the Holmenkollen medal in 1938 (Shared with Reidar Andersen).
