= Sverre Lassen-Urdahl =

Norwegian alpine skier (1913–2005)

Sverre Lassen-Urdahl (17 February 1913 – 31 December 2005) was a Norwegian alpine skier, born in Lake Forest, Illinois, United States. He participated at the 1948 Winter Olympics in Saint Moritz, where he competed in the downhill, tying 11th.
