= Ulland Andersen =

Ulland Andersen is a surname. Notable people with the surname include:

- Andreas Ulland Andersen (born 1989), Norwegian footballer
- Eirik Ulland Andersen (born 1992), Norwegian footballer, brother of Andreas
