= Richard Bühler =

Swiss ski jumper

Personal information
- Nationality: Swiss
- Born: 24 February 1915; Sainte-Croix, Switzerland
- Died: 25 September 1959 (aged 44); L'Auberson, Switzerland

Sport
- Sport: Ski jumping

Richard Bühler (24 February 1915 – 25 September 1959) was a Swiss ski jumper. He competed in the individual event at the 1936 Winter Olympics.
