= Hans Marr (ski jumper) =

German ski jumper

Personal information
- Nationality: German
- Born: 7 October 1914; Oberhof, German Empire
- Died: 21 March 1942 (aged 27); Barisau, German-occupied Belarus

Sport
- Sport: Ski jumping

Hans Marr (7 October 1914 – 21 March 1942) was a German ski jumper. He competed in the individual event at the 1936 Winter Olympics. He was killed in action during World War II.
