= Franz Aschenwald =

Austrian ski jumper

Personal information
- Nationality: Austrian
- Born: 11 January 1913 Mayrhofen, Tyrol, Austria-Hungary
- Died: 31 January 1945 (aged 32) Vienna, Austria

Sport
- Sport: Ski jumping

Franz Aschenwald (11 January 1913 – 31 January 1945) was an Austrian ski jumper. He competed in the individual event at the 1936 Winter Olympics.
