= Jaroslav Lukeš =

Czech cross-country skier

Personal information
- Nationality: Czech
- Born: 5 February 1912

Sport
- Sport: Skiing

Jaroslav Lukeš (born 5 February 1912) was a Czech skier who competed at the 1936 Winter Olympics and 1948 Winter Olympics.
