= Oldřich Buďárek =

Czech ski jumper

Personal information
- Nationality: Czech
- Born: 11 March 1915; Martinice v Krkonoších, Austria-Hungary

Sport
- Sport: Ski jumping

Oldřich Buďárek (born 11 March 1915, date of death unknown) was a Czech ski jumper. He competed in the individual event at the 1936 Winter Olympics.
