= Stanisław Marusarz =

Polish Nordic skier (1913–1993)

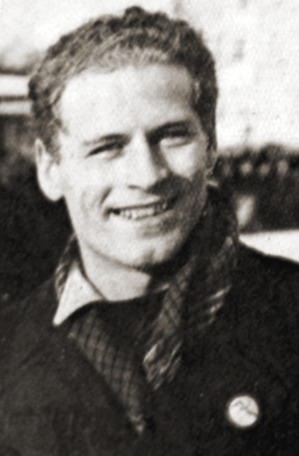

Personal information
- Nationality: Poland
- Born: 18 June 1913 Zakopane, Poland
- Died: 29 October 1993 (aged 80) Zakopane, Poland

Sport
- Sport: Skiing
- Club: SN PTT Zakopane; Legia Zakopane

Achievements and titles
- Personal bests: 95 m (312 ft); Planica, Kingdom of Yugoslavia (15 March 1935)
Medal record
Men's ski jumping
World Championships
Silver medal – second place	1938 Lahti	Individual LH

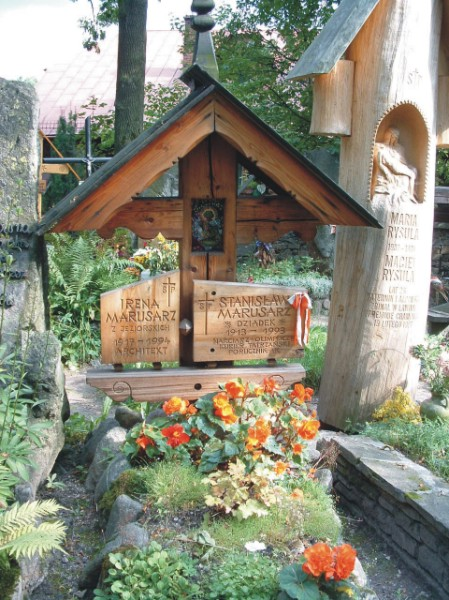
Grave of Stanisław Marusarz in Zakopane

Stanisław Marusarz (Polish pronunciation: [staˈɲiswav maˈrusaʂ]); 18 June 1913 – 29 October 1993) was a Polish Nordic skiing competitor in the 1930s. Honoured Master of Sport of Poland.

== Life ==
Stanisław Marusarz won a silver medal in ski jumping at the 1938 FIS Nordic World Ski Championships in Lahti — the first Pole ever to earn a medal in the championships. He also finished sixth in the individual Nordic combined event at the 1933 FIS Nordic World Ski Championships in Innsbruck.

Marusarz was named one of the best young talents in ski jumping in the late 1920s and earned his first national title in 1931. Many skiers outside of the Nordic countries (Finland, Norway, and Sweden), who dominated classical skiing in the early 20th century, considered Marusarz "the best Nordic combiner in the world after [the] Norwegians."

On 15 March 1935, he set a ski jumping world record at 95 metres (312 ft) on Bloudkova velikanka hill in Planica, Kingdom of Yugoslavia and gained international success and recognition.

After that success, people waited for the moment when he would finish ahead of the Norwegians. His best chance came at the 1938 FIS Nordic World Ski Championships in Lahti where he struggled to win over the famous Ruud brothers: (Birger, Sigmund, and Asbjørn). Marusarz made the two best jumps in competition of 66 and 67 meters, earning him a total of 226.2 points, but the judges gave him much lower style scores than his rival (and friend) Asbjørn Ruud, the youngest of the three Ruud brothers – who jumped 63.5 and 64 m. Asbjørn Ruud won the competition with 226.4 points. Ruud thought about handing the gold over to Marusarz during the medal ceremony, but he settled on naming him the "Moral World Champion". Marusarz was favored to win the ski jumping competition at the 1939 FIS Nordic World Ski Championships in Zakopane, but finished a disappointing fifth because of an arm injury suffered prior to the competition.

Marusarz took part in five Winter Olympics. He finished 27th in the 18 km cross country event, 22nd in the Nordic combined and 17th in ski jumping at the 1932 Winter Olympics in Lake Placid, New York. Four years later in Garmisch-Partenkirchen, he finished 5th in the ski jump and 7th in the Nordic combined. After World War II, Marusarz finished 27th in the ski jump event both at the 1948 Winter Olympics and the 1952 Winter Olympics. His last Winter Olympic participation (but not competition) was at Cortina d'Ampezzo in 1956, where at age 43 he ski-jumped as a forejumper.

After the German attack on Poland in 1939, he joined the AK and fought for Poland's independence until 1940, when he was captured and sentenced to death. However, Marusarz successfully escaped from a German prison and fled to Hungary, where he stayed until war's end.

Marusarz was the flag-bearer for Poland at the opening ceremony of the 1952 Winter Olympics.

In 1966 he created a memorable moment for Polish supporters, when organizers of the Four Hills Tournament asked him to make a show jump. At age 53, Marusarz jumped 66 meters.

== Brother ==
Stanisław's brother Jan Marusarz was likewise a prewar Polish Olympic skier. During World War II, Jan escorted famous Polish SOE agent Krystyna Skarbek across the Tatra Mountains, on skis, from Hungary into Poland. After the war, Jan lived in London, England, where he served as a factotum at the Polish White Eagle Club.

== Honours and awards ==
- Silver Cross of the Virtuti Militari
- Grand Cross of the Order of Polonia Restituta – 2010, posthumously; previously awarded the Commander's Cross and the Knight's Cross
- Cross of Valour – twice
- Gold Cross of Merit
- Armia Krajowa Cross
- Polish Army Medal – twice
- Medal of Victory and Freedom 1945
- Badge of Honor Soldier Army Headquarters
- Honoured Master of Sport of Poland, 1950

== Ski jumping world record ==
Date	Hill	Location	Metres	Feet
15 March 1935	Bloudkova velikanka K106	Planica, Kingdom of Yugoslavia	95	312

== See also ==
- List of Poles

Olympic Games
Preceded by Stanisław Marusarz	Flagbearer for Poland; St. Moritz 1948, Oslo 1952	Succeeded by Tadeusz Kwapień
