= Richard Rabasa =

French ski jumper

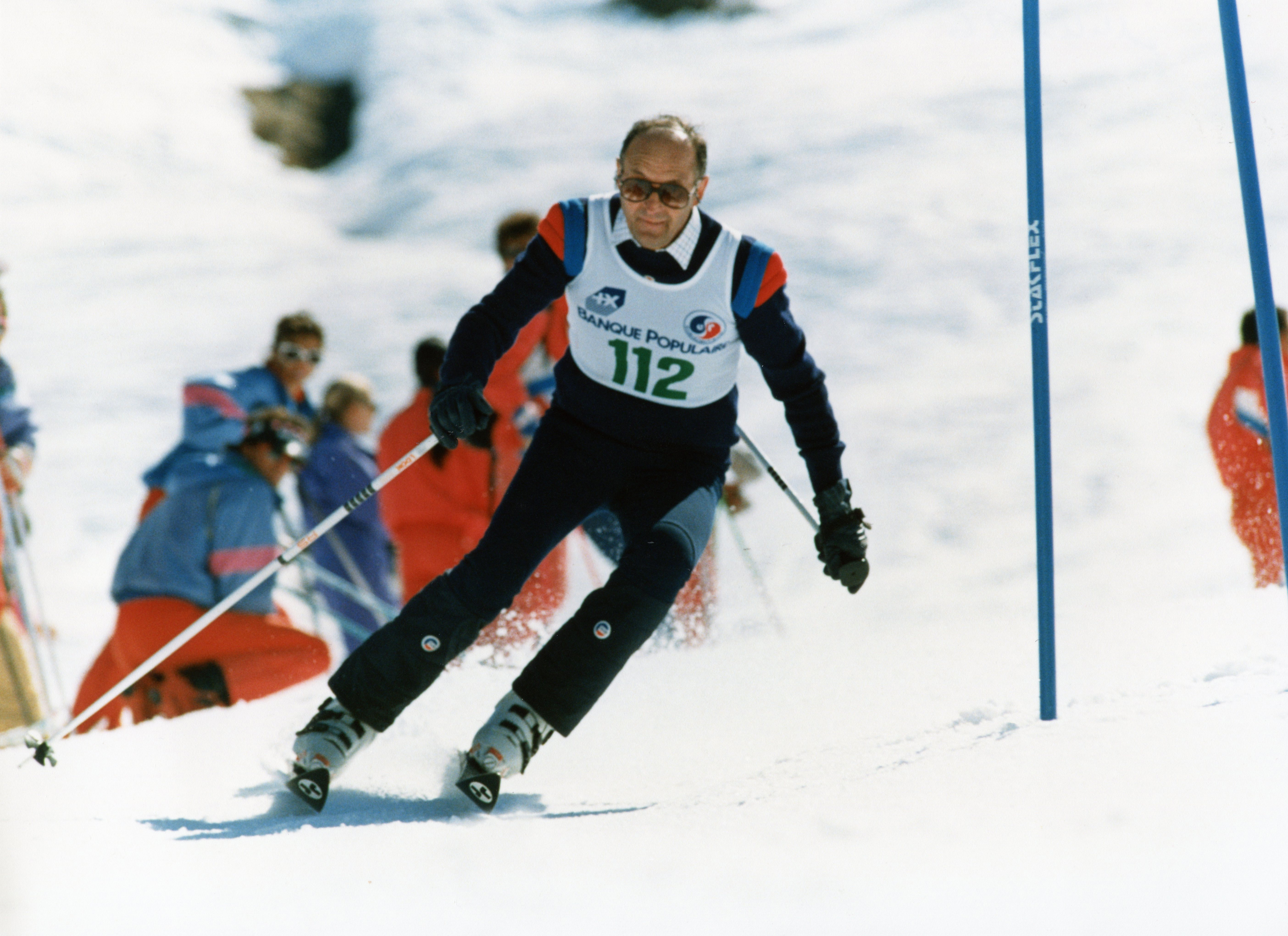

Personal information
- Nationality: French
- Born: 5 July 1931
- Died: 19 February 2011 (aged 79)

Sport
- Sport: Ski jumping

Richard Rabasa (5 July 1931 – 19 February 2011) was a French ski jumper. He competed in the individual event at the 1956 Winter Olympics.
