= Sven Pettersson =

Swedish ski jumper

Personal information
- Nationality: (Sweden)
- Born: 24 July 1927 Härnösand, Sweden
- Died: 19 April 2017 (aged 89) Sundsvall, Sweden

Sport
- Sport: Skiing

Sven Pettersson (July 24, 1927 – April 19, 2017) was a Swedish ski jumper who competed in the 1950s. He finished fifth in the individual large hill at the 1956 Winter Olympics in Cortina d'Ampezzo. He was born in Härnösand.
