= Albin Jakopič =

Slovenian ski jumper

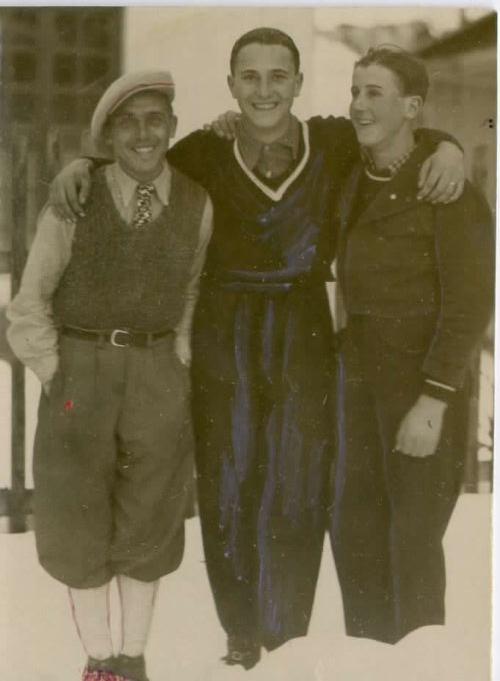
- Albin Jakopič (left) in 1935

Personal information
- Nationality: Slovenian
- Born: 3 February 1912; Mojstrana, Austria-Hungary
- Died: 18 January 1947 (aged 34)

Sport
- Sport: Ski jumping

Albin Jakopič (3 February 1912 – 18 January 1947) was a Slovenian ski jumper. He competed in the individual event at the 1936 Winter Olympics.
