= Tone Dečman =

Slovenian Nordic combined skier

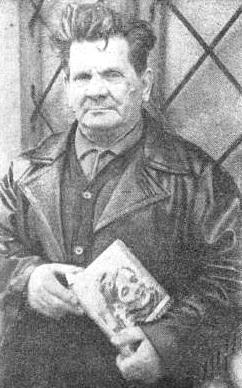
- Tone Dečman in 1966

Personal information
- Nationality: Slovenian
- Born: 26 June 1913; Ljubljana, Austria-Hungary
- Died: June 1989 (aged 75–76)

Sport
- Sport: Nordic combined

Tone Dečman (26 June 1913 – June 1989) was a Slovenian skier. He competed in the Nordic combined event at the 1936 Winter Olympics.
