= Rudolf Rieger =

Austrian ski jumper

Personal information
- Nationality: Austrian
- Born: 5 January 1916; Brunn am Gebirge, Austria-Hungary
- Died: 13 March 1996 (aged 80)

Sport
- Sport: Ski jumping

Rudolf Rieger (5 January 1916 – 13 March 1996) was an Austrian ski jumper. He competed in the individual event at the 1936 Winter Olympics.
