= Franc Palme =

Slovenian ski jumper

- Country: Kingdom of Yugoslavia
- Born: 14 December 1914; Ljubljana, Austria-Hungary
- Died: 27 February 1946 (aged 31); Ljubljana, Yugoslavia

Franc Palme (14 December 1914 – 27 February 1946) was a Slovenian ski jumper.

== Career ==
Palme competed in 1930s for the Kingdom of Yugoslavia. He took 43rd place on small hill at the 1936 Winter Olympics in Garmisch-Partenkirchen. In February 1934, he won the national championships at the opening competition Bloudkova velikanka in Planica. At this opening competition he also set first two hill records with 55 and 60 meters. At the time, these two jumps were national.

== Winter Olympics ==
Rank	Location	Year	Hill
43	(Germany) Garmisch-Partenkirchen	1936	normal
