= Rudolf Vrána =

Czech Nordic combined skier

Personal information
- Nationality: Czech
- Born: 14 July 1910
- Died: 27 February 1983 (aged 72)

Sport
- Sport: Nordic combined

Rudolf Vrána (14 July 1910 – 27 February 1983) was a Czech skier. He competed in the Nordic combined event at the 1936 Winter Olympics.
