= Gustl Berauer =

Czechoslovak Nordic combined skier (1912–1986)

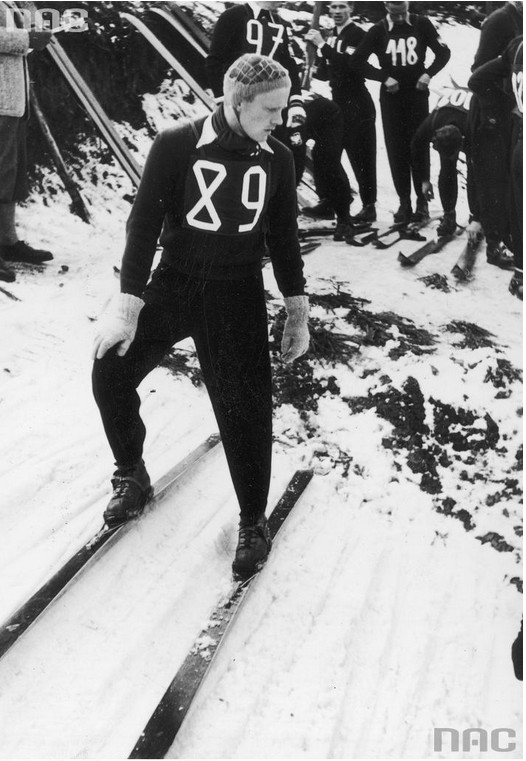
- Gustav Berauer in 1939

Medal record

Men's Nordic combined

World Championships
Gold medal – first place	1939 Zakopane	Individual

Gustav "Gustl" Berauer (5 November 1912 – 18 May 1986) was a Czechoslovak Nordic combined skier of German ethnicity who competed in the 1930s.

He was born in Pec pod Sněžkou, Bohemia, Austria-Hungary (now in the Czech Republic). At the 1936 Winter Olympics in Garmisch-Partenkirchen, Berauer finished 14th in the Nordic combined, 21st in the 18 km cross-country event and was part of the Czechoslovak team that finished 5th in the 4 x 10 km relay.

His real strength lay in the Nordic combined. He won a gold medal in that individual event at the 1939 FIS Nordic World Ski Championships in Zakopane while competing for Nazi Germany in the wake of Czechoslovakia being annexed in late 1938. It was the first German world champion in Nordic skiing. At the World Championships in 1941 in Cortina d'Ampezzo, he successfully defended his title. The World Championship, associated with the International Ski Federation (FIS), was officially cancelled in 1946.

During World War II Berauer was a senior non-commissioned officer in the Gebirgsjäger corps (English: mountain troops). After the war he was incapable of returning to his sport due to a serious wound on the Eastern Front. From 1963 to 1975, he was the Chairman of the FIS Committee "Nordic combined". In 1986, Berauer died in Schliersee, Bavaria, Germany.
