= Walter Delle Karth Sr. =

Austrian Nordic combined skier

Personal information
- Nationality: Austrian
- Born: 12 August 1911
- Died: 2004 (aged 92–93)

Sport
- Sport: Nordic combined

Walter Delle Karth Sr. (12 August 1911 – 2004) was an Austrian skier. He competed in the Nordic combined event at the 1936 Winter Olympics.
