= Gregor Höll =

Austrian skier (1911–1999)

Personal information
- Born: 26 June 1911 Lungötz, Austria-Hungary
- Died: 24 November 1999 (aged 88) Sankt Veit im Pongau, Austria

Sport
- Country: Austria
- Sport: Skiing
- Club: SC Bischofshofen

Gregor Höll (26 June 1911 – 24 November 1999) was an Austrian skier. He competed at the 1932 Winter Olympics and the 1948 Winter Olympics.

== Invalid ski jumping world record ==
Date	Hill	Location	Metres	Feet
25 March 1934	Bloudkova velikanka K90	Planica, Kingdom of Yugoslavia	89	292

Not recognized. Crash at world record distance.
