= Olav Ulland =

Norwegian ski jumper

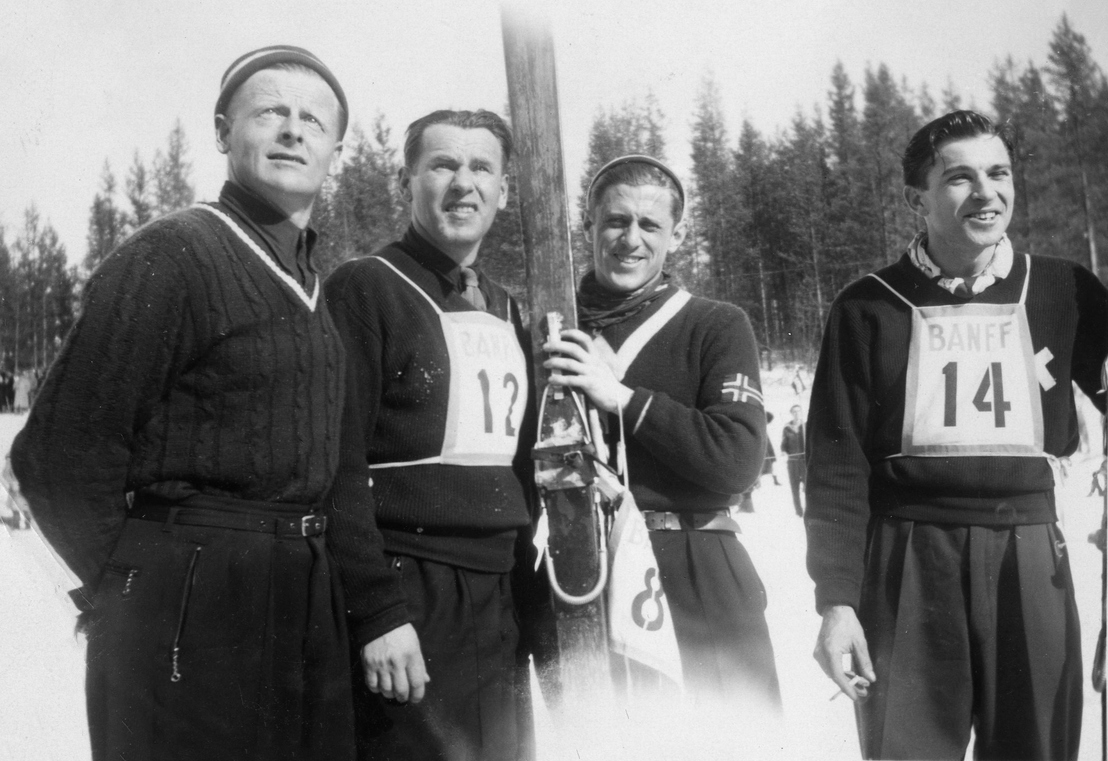
- Ulland is second from the left, 1949

Personal information
- Nationality: Norway; United States
- Born: 23 November 1910 Kongsberg, Norway
- Died: 7 June 2003 (aged 92) Bellevue, Washington, US

Sport
- Sport: Skiing

Olav Ulland (23 November 1910 – 7 June 2003) was a Norwegian-American ski jumper who competed during the 1930s and 1940s.

== Career ==
He took 5th place at World Championships 1930 in Oslo. He coached the Italian ski jumping team at Winter Olympics 1936 in Garmisch-Partenkirchen and took over American national team year later.

In 1954, Olav Ulland co-founded a new ski club in Seattle, Kongsberger Ski Club, which still exists. From the beginning, the club operated with both ski jumping and cross country skiing, but since 1974 the club has operated only cross country skiing. The United States Ski Association awarded him the Julius Blegen Award in 1957. He was inducted into the US Ski Hall of Fame in 1981.

The Pacific Northwest Ski Association Regional Ski Association awards the Olav Ulland Award annually to the athlete of the year in the Nordic branches.

On 17 March 1935 he became the first man in history who jumped over hundred metres at Trampolino Gigante Corno d'Aola hill in Ponte di Legno, Kingdom of Italy; but he glided with his hands at 103.5 metres (340 ft) and it wasn't recognized as the world record.

== Invalid ski jumping world record ==
First ever ski jump over 100 metres in history.

| Date | Hill | Location | Metres | Feet |
|---|---|---|---|---|
| 17 March 1935 | Trampolino Gigante Corno d’Aola | Ponte di Legno, Kingdom of Italy | 103.5 | 340 |

Not recognized as official: touched the ground at world record distance.
