= Albin Novšak =

Slovenian ski jumper

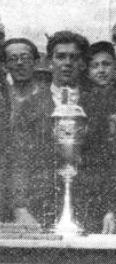

Personal information
- Nationality: Slovenian
- Born: 10 February 1915; Bohinjska Bistrica, Austria-Hungary
- Died: 29 January 1992 (aged 76)

Sport
- Sport: Ski jumping

Albin Novšak (10 February 1915 – 29 January 1992) was a Slovenian ski jumper. He competed in the individual event at the 1936 Winter Olympics.
