= Josef Bradl =

Austrian ski jumper

- Bradl in 1967

Personal information
- Nationality: Austria; Nazi Germany
- Born: 8 January 1918 Wasserburg am Inn, Germany
- Died: 3 March 1982 (aged 64) Mühlbach am Hochkönig, Austria

Sport
- Sport: Skiing
- Club: SC Mühlbach am Hochkönig; SC Bischofshofen; SC Salzburg

World Cup career
- Four Hills titles: 1 (1953)

Achievements and titles
- Personal bests: 130 m (430 ft); Oberstdorf, West Germany (3 March 1951)
Medal record
Men's ski jumping
World Championships
Gold medal – first place	1939 Zakopane	Individual LH

Josef "Sepp" / "Bubi" Bradl (8 January 1918 – 3 March 1982) was an Austrian ski jumper who competed during the 1930s and 1950s. He was born in Wasserburg am Inn, Bavaria.

== Career ==
On 15 March 1936, he became the first man in history to stand to stand on feet a "flight" of more than one hundred meters at 101.5 m (333 ft) on Bloudkova velikanka hill in Planica, Kingdom of Yugoslavia.

On 15 March 1938, exactly two years later after historic jump, he set another world record at 107 m (351 ft), this time again on Bloudkova velikanka hill in Planica, Kingdom of Yugoslavia.

He won the ski jumping gold medal at the 1939 FIS Nordic World Ski Championships in Zakopane while competing under Nazi Germany in the wake of Austria being annexed in late 1938.

Following World War II, Bradl wasn't allowed to compete in 1948 Olympics because he was a Sturmbannführer in the paramilitary Nazi organization Sturmabteilung.

He returned to competition in the early 1950s and was the first winner of the Four Hills Tournament in 1952/53, this time representing his home country of Austria. He would earn one of his post-war victories at the Olympia hill in Garmisch-Partenkirchen, West Germany in 1953 as part of the Four Hills tournament, then earn his final career victory the following year in Bischofshofen, Austria.

On 3 March 1951, at the International Ski Flying Week competition, he set his personal best at 130 metres (430 ft) on Heini-Klopfer-Skiflugschanze hill in Oberstdorf, West Germany.

After retiring, he became a ski jumping coach, coaching the national teams of Germany and Austria. He lived in Mühlbach am Hochkönig in the province (state) Salzburg where he died in March 1982.

== Ski jumping world records ==
First official fully standing jump over 100 metres in history.

Date	Hill	Location	Metres	Feet
15 March 1936	Bloudkova velikanka K106	Planica, Kingdom of Yugoslavia	101.5	333
15 March 1938	Bloudkova velikanka K106	Planica, Kingdom of Yugoslavia	107	351

*On 17 March 1935, Olav Ulland as first ever broke hundred metres barrier at 103.5 m in Ponte di Legno, but crashed.
