= Isabel Coursier =

Canadian ski jumper (1906–1990)

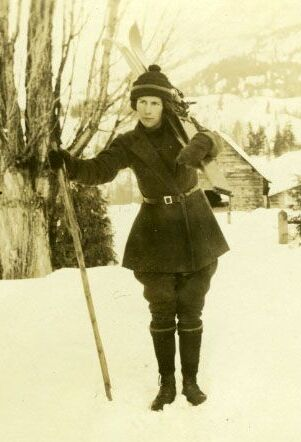
- Coursier in 1925

Personal information
- Born: March 21, 1906 Revelstoke, British Columbia, Canada
- Died: October 15, 1990 (aged 84) Penticton, British Columbia, Canada

Sport
- Sport: Skiing

Achievements and titles
- Personal bests: 31.4 m (103 ft); Big Hill, February 1928

Isabel Patricia Coursier (March 21, 1906 – October 15, 1990) was a Canadian ski jumper and multi-sport athlete known for being the first North American to break the record for women’s ski jumping. She was viewed as the sport’s first female world champion from 1922 until her final jump in 1929. Her initial world record was set at 26 metres during her debut at Mount Revelstoke National Park’s Big Hill in February 1922, and was held until 1926. Her second world record was set at 31 metres in 1928, also at the Big Hill, and was held until 1931. She was one of four ski jumpers to set world records at the hill, joined by Henry Hall and fellow Revelstoke residents Nels Nelsen and Bob Lymburne.

Coursier attended university and became a schoolteacher shortly before retiring from ski jumping.

== Early life and athletic career ==
Isabel Patricia Coursier was born on March 21, 1906, to Isabel Steed Coursier and Henry Noble Coursier in Revelstoke, British Columbia. She went by the name Pat, derived from her middle name. She had a sister and two brothers, one of whom died of drowning at the age of six.

Henry was a well respected businessman, and had a local creek named in his honour in 1939, shortly after his death. The elder Isabel was a painter and the first woman on Revelstoke’s school board. Both were active in the local mountaineering community, and imparted the love of the outdoors on their children. In Pat’s own words, she "was always in the out-of-doors sliding on something either by the seat of [her] pants or a pan or a shovel or a piece of linoleum."

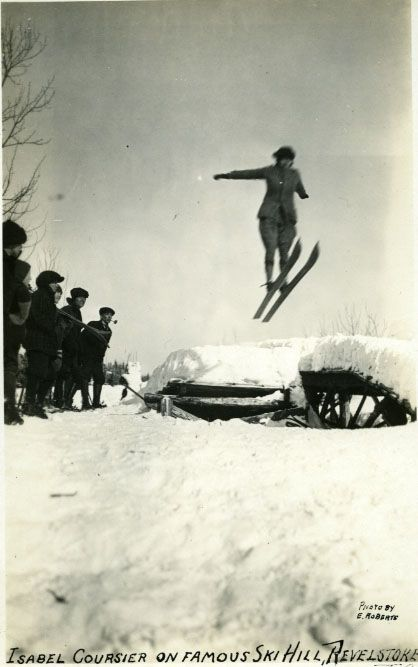
Coursier during a jump at Big Hill in 1922

Growing up near Mount Revelstoke National Park, Pat Coursier was given her first pair of skis at eight years old. They were handcrafted by a neighbour. By fifteen she was participating in local ski competitions. On February 7, 1922, a month short of her sixteenth birthday, she competed at the Revelstoke Ski Tournament where she placed third in boys Class D with a jump of 25.6 m (84 ft). She broke the distance record for female ski jumpers, and became the first North American to accomplish the feat. Leading up to the competition, she landed practice jumps exceeding 100 ft (30 m). She performed the jumps alone at a time when women were expected to be assisted by male jumpers, becoming the first woman in the country to do so. Coursier also participated in the ladies ski run, where she placed first, and the pony-ski race. The latter event was later removed from local events due to being too dangerous.

Coursier entered the 1923 tournament as a world champion ski jumper. The Revelstoke Ski Club presented her with a medal in honour of "the skill and daring displayed by the only lady ski-jumper in North America". She would place first in the ladies’ race and go on to participate in tournaments hosted in Nakusp and Mount Rainier National Park that year. She was presented with a special trophy at the Mount Rainier tournament on July 4. United States President Warren G. Harding was in attendance, marking one of his final public appearances.

In 1925, Coursier enrolled at McGill University in Montreal, Quebec, where she studied physical and health education. She was an exceptional student athlete at McGill, where she played tennis, basketball, and ice hockey. She also participated in track and field, where she medalled in javelin throw and baseball throw. In December 1926, she was invited by a local winter sports club to perform exhibition jumps on the Cote des Neiges hill, and became the first known woman to do so. She graduated in 1927, and took a job as a physical education teacher at the normal school in Victoria.

In February 1928, Coursier returned to the Big Hill for the first time in five years. Despite no preparation, she made a 31.4 m (103 ft) Class B jump, breaking her previous record. She made her final jump in 1929 before retiring from the sport.

== Later life and death ==
Coursier continued as a physical education teacher following her retirement from ski jumping. In 1938 she moved to the United Kingdom, and by 1952 she was a ski instructor in Scotland. Later that year she accepted a teaching job in Nanaimo, British Columbia. She returned to Scotland two years later, and studied art in Glasgow. After completing her studies in 1959, she taught in Vancouver for another two years before returning to Scotland, where she remained until she retired from teaching in 1967.

In a 1968 interview, she commented on the commercialization of winter sports, noting that she was "appalled" and "very sorry for parents who [were] trying to keep up with [kids] who want to take part in winter sports". She also commented that when she was young, "parents simply could not afford all the fancy gear that seems to be standard today." At the time Coursier was active, athletes wore whatever clothing was available. She was also interviewed in 1977.

Following her retirement, Coursier permanently returned to British Columbia and settled in Parksville. She resided in Penticton at the time of her death on October 15, 1990, at age 84. (Note: Some sources state her date of death as October 16, 1980.)

== Legacy ==
I truly believe that Isabel’s spirit lives in this valley. I see so many women in Revelstoke just like her. Athletes, mountain guides, artists, mothers, business owners. Blazing their own trails, making their own rules and constantly defying what is "acceptable" and "expected".

— Zoya Lynch, Instagram post (August 27, 2021)

On September 24, 2022, a life sized bronze statue of Coursier was unveiled in front of Revelstoke City Hall for the 100th anniversary of her 1922 jump. The statue was commissioned by Arts Revelstoke and crafted by sculptor Ruth Abernethy to honour her accomplishments and inspire other female athletes. This was Abernethy’s first statue of a woman.

The statue was also inspired by another local ski jumper, Zoya Lynch, who was part of Team Canada from 2004 to 2008, and joined a lawsuit against the Vancouver Organizing Committee for the 2010 Olympic and Paralympic Winter Games after they decided against including women’s ski jump as an event. Lynch’s advocacy for inclusion of women in the sport led her to explore Coursier’s legacy, and the general lack of recognition that female ski jumpers have had in the century since her record breaking jump. In a 2021 Instagram post, Lynch noted that she felt "deeply inspired and even a bit connected to Isabel [Coursier]".

=== Ski jumping world records ===
Date	Hill	Location	Metres	Feet	Ref
February 7, 1922	Big Hill	Revelstoke, Canada	25.6	84	
February 1928	Big Hill	Revelstoke, Canada	31.4	103	

== See also ==
- List of longest ski jumps
- Alexandria Loutitt — Canadian ski jumper who broke the women's world record in 2023
