= Nels Nelsen Hill =

Abandoned ski jumping hill in Canada

Coordinates: 51.008°N 118.192°W

Nels Nelsen Hill (Big Hill)
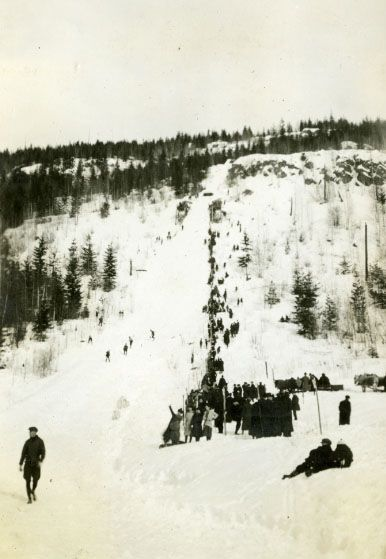
- Big Hill in 1916
- Location: Revelstoke, BC, Canada
- Opened: 1916
- Renovated: 1961
- Expanded: 1948
- Closed: 1975

Size
- K–point: K80, K60
- Hill record: 94.5 m (310 ft); Kjell Sjöberg (1967)

Nels Nelsen Hill (orig.: Big Hill) is an abandoned ski jumping hill located in Mount Revelstoke National Park near the city of Revelstoke, British Columbia, Canada. The original hill, Big Hill, was built in 1916 and was the first permanent ski jump in Canada. By 1933, five world length records had been set on the Big Hill. It fell out of use in 1939, with Revelstoke instead using the Big Bend Ski Jump.

Big Hill was rebuilt to a K80 hill in 1948 and was named in honor of Nels Nelsen, a local ski jumper who had set two world records on the hill. Among the events hosted there were the annual Tournament of Champions and the 1949 edition of the Western Canada Ski Championships. In the vicinity was a K60 hill and other smaller hills. The hill record of 94.5 meters (310 ft) was set by Kjell Sjöberg in 1967. The last major tournament was held in 1974. The venue has not been used since 1975 and has fallen into disrepair.

== First hill ==
Skiing in Revelstoke started in 1890 with the influx of Norwegian immigrants who brought with them their tradition of home-made skis. By the early 1910s, ski jumping was a major pastime during winter, with small ski jumps being built all around the town. Revelstoke Ski Club was founded in 1914 and reached 102 members within a year. Starting in 1915, the club's annual high point was the Winter Carnival Tournament. The first tournament was held in 1915, and featured competitions in cross-country skiing and ski jumping for boys under 16, and awarded the title of Champion of British Columbia. The inaugurate tournament was won by Nels Nelson.

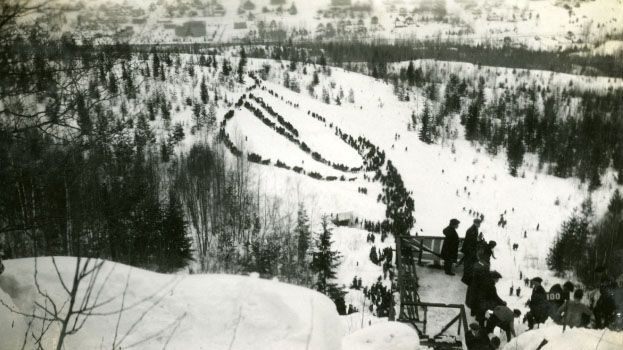
The hill in 1921

One of the jury members for the jumping competition, Ambassador Iverson of Norway, helped find a suitable location for a new, permanent ski jumping hill. The hill selected was located in Mount Revelstoke National Park near Revelstoke, British Columbia. It would allow for world-record jumps, and the natural inclination of the hill allowed this to be done without an artificial tower. As the site was located within the national park, a lease was obtained, which was financed through a $1,200 grant from the chamber of commerce and the municipality. Revelstoke was the largest town in the British Columbia Interior at the time, and easily accessible due to its location on the Canadian Pacific Railway mainline.

Big Hill was first used for the 1916 Winter Carnival, in which Nelsen in training landed at world record distance at 55.8 meters (183 feet) and wasn't recognized. He beat his own record several times and kept the hill record until 1921. The tournament was gradually expanded, and by 1921 it cost $5,800 to arrange. That year, Henry Hall set a world length record in the hill, jumping 70 meters (230 feet). Three thousand spectators watched the games, in which many of the world's elite skiers competed. To accommodate the extra spectators, Canadian Pacific Railway stationed sleeping cars at Revelstoke to supplement the hotels. In 1922, Isabel Coursier debuted as Big Hill's first women jumper. In 1923, the tournament climaxed with 99 participating ski jumpers. In 1925, while sick with the flu, Nelsen beat Hall's world record by jumping 73.1 meters (240 feet). The record would remain until 1930.

In 1928, the hill was expanded to allow for jumps to 79 meters (259 feet). A car was offered to anyone able to beat Nelsen's record jump at the Big Hill, provided that at least three outside jumpers participated in the competition. The prize was offered by local fur dealer J. H. Munro, who hoped to attract the world's elite ski jumpers to Revelstoke. Many of the world's best ski jumpers attended that year's tournament, such as Henry Hall, Harry Lien, Ivan Knudsen and Alf Engen. Nelsen won the race, but failed to break his own record. The record was eventually broken by Adolph Badrut at Tremplin de Bretaye in Switzerland in 1930, who jumped 75 meters (246 ft). Bob Lymburne was able to again land at the world record distance, when he landed 82 meters (269 ft) in 1932, however this was unofficial event, recognized only as an amateur record. He lost the record to Sigmund Ruud the following year, but by the end of the season, Lymburne reclaimed the title with a jump of 87.5 meters (287 feet). Birger Ruud exceeded Lymbourne's record in 1934 and no further world records were set in Revelstoke. Big Hill is the only ski jumping venue in Canada to have set world records.

== Hill replaced ==
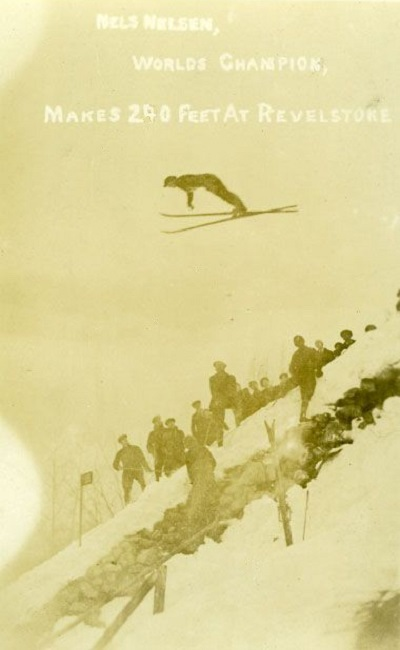
Nels Nelsen as he sets the world record of 73 meters (240 feet) in 1925

On 15 January 1939, the Big Bend Ski Jump replaced Big Hill. It was located just north of town, allowing for a short walk to the venue and easier maintenance. It had been built to allow Revelstoke to host the Western Canada Ski Championships. It was a success for Revelstoke, with "ski trains" being set up from Vancouver to bring people in from the city to watch the events. The championships were broadcast on radio and received unprecedented newspaper attention for a Revelstoke skiing event. During the Second World War, only junior tournaments were contested. In 1946, the Big Bend was renamed Hans Gunnarsen Ski Jump in honor of local jumper Hans Gunnarsen who had died in action. In 1947, Revelstoke again hosted the Western Canadian Ski Championships.

== Last hill ==
In April 1948, the Big Hill was rebuilt and renamed Nels Nelsen Hill. With grants from the National Parks Department, Revelstoke Ski Club rebuilt the hill to meet the profile criteria set by the International Ski Federation, giving the hill a construction point of 80 meters (260 ft). The first tournament was the International Invitational Ski Jumping Tournament held in March 1949, and attended by 2,500 people. It was inaugurated by local ski jumper Art Johnson and the tournament was won by Petter Hugsted of Norway, who jumped 75 meters (246 feet). In 1950, the first Tournament of Champions was held to which seven Norwegian jumpers were invited. Art Johnson re-mortgaged his home for $8000 to pay for the expenses of the Norwegians. The event was won by Arnfinn Bergmann. The tournament was held throughout the 1950s and started attracting jumpers from Sweden, Finland, Germany and Japan. The 1958 edition was the first to be televised, although this resulted in fewer spectators. That year's event saw a new hill record of 82 meters (269 feet) be set by Norway's Odd Brevik. The following year, Finland's Kalevi Kärkinen broke the record, reaching 85 meters (279 feet).

In 1961, the wooden judge's tower was replaced by a new one in steel. Tournaments were held every year except in 1963, when it was canceled because of lack of snow. The 1960s also saw the construction of a smaller hill with a construction point of 60 meters (200 ft) which was used for Olympic trials. The town even considered placing a bid for the 1968 Winter Olympics. However, throughout the 1960s, the interest in ski jumping was declining, resulting in lower attendance. The North American Nordic Championship was held in 1962, and two years later Nels Nelsen Hill hosted the Canadian Nordic Championships, attracting crowds of up to 3,000 spectators. In 1967, Kjell Sjöberg set a Canadian jumping record of 94.5 meters (310 feet). The Tournament of Champions, which had with a few interruptions been running since the inauguration, continued into the early 1970s.

The hill required a lot of volunteer work to maintain and run during the season and particularly for the tournament. It also lacked a ski lift. Combined, this made it increasingly difficult to recruit new ski jumpers during the 1960s, particularly after a lift was installed on Mount Revelstoke in 1961. Skiing activities moved to Mount Mackenzie during the 1960s and in 1973, the ski club also relocated to there. The Tournament of Champions during 1971 and 1972 incurred a heavy loss. The last major tournaments on Nels Nelson Hill were the Western Canadian Ski Jumping Tournament, the Canadian Junior and Senior Ski Jumping Championship and the International Cross Country Championship, held in February and March 1974. The last tournament was a junior event held in 1975. The venue has since fallen into disrepair.

== Ski jumping world records ==
=== Men ===
No.	Date	Name	Country	Metres	Feet
TR	1 February 1916	Nels Nelsen	Canada	55.8	183
#27	9 February 1921	Henry Hall	United States	69.8	229
F	March 1923	Nels Nelsen	Canada	71.3	234
F	5 February 1924	Nels Nelsen	Canada	71.6	235
F	6 February 1924	Nels Nelsen	Canada	71.6	235
#28	4 February 1925	Nels Nelsen	Canada	73.1	240
UN	12 March 1932	Robert Lymburne	Canada	82	269
#35	15 March 1933	Robert Lymburne	Canada	87.5	287

=== Ladies ===
No.	Date	Name	Country	Metres	Feet
#8	7 February 1922	Isabel Coursier	Canada	25.6	84
#11	February 1928	Isabel Coursier	Canada	31.4	103

Not recognized! Stood at WR distance. Training.
Not recognized! Crashes at world record distances.
Not recognized! He stood and tied Lymburne's WR at hors concours, only an amateur record.
