= Revelstoke =

Revelstoke may refer to:

== Places ==
- Revelstoke, British Columbia, a city in British Columbia, Canada
  - Revelstoke (electoral district), a former provincial electoral district
  - Revelstoke Airport, the airport serving the city of Revelstoke, British Columbia, Canada
  - Revelstoke Grizzlies, a junior ice hockey team in Revelstoke, British Columbia, Canada
  - Revelstoke Lake, a reservoir on the Columbia River behind Revelstoke Dam in British Columbia
  - Revelstoke Mountain Resort, a ski resort just outside of Revelstoke, British Columbia, Canada
- Revelstoke, Devon, a village in the South Hams district of Devon, England

== British peerage ==
- Baron Revelstoke, a title in the Peerage of the United Kingdom
- Edward Baring, 1st Baron Revelstoke
- James Baring, 6th Baron Revelstoke
