= Bruce Holloway =

Bruce Holloway may refer to:

- Bruce Holloway (ice hockey) (born 1963), professional hockey player
- Bruce K. Holloway (1912–1999), U.S. Air Force general and Strategic Air Command commander
