= School District 19 Revelstoke =

School district in British Columbia, Canada

- School District 19 Revelstoke Logo

Location
- Revelstoke Revelstoke in Okanagan/Mainline Canada

District information
- Superintendent: Roberta Kubik
- Schools: 4
- Budget: CA$10.0 million

Students and staff
- Students: 1,140

Other information
- Website: sd19.bc.ca

School District 19 Revelstoke is a public school district in Revelstoke, British Columbia.

== Schools ==
School	Location	Grades
Columbia Park Elementary School	Revelstoke	K-7
Arrow Heights Elementary School	Revelstoke	K-7
Revelstoke Secondary School	Revelstoke	8-12
Begbie View Elementary School	Revelstoke	K-7

== See also ==
- List of school districts in British Columbia
