= Nels Nelsen =

Norwegian-born Canadian ski jumper and ski jumping organizer

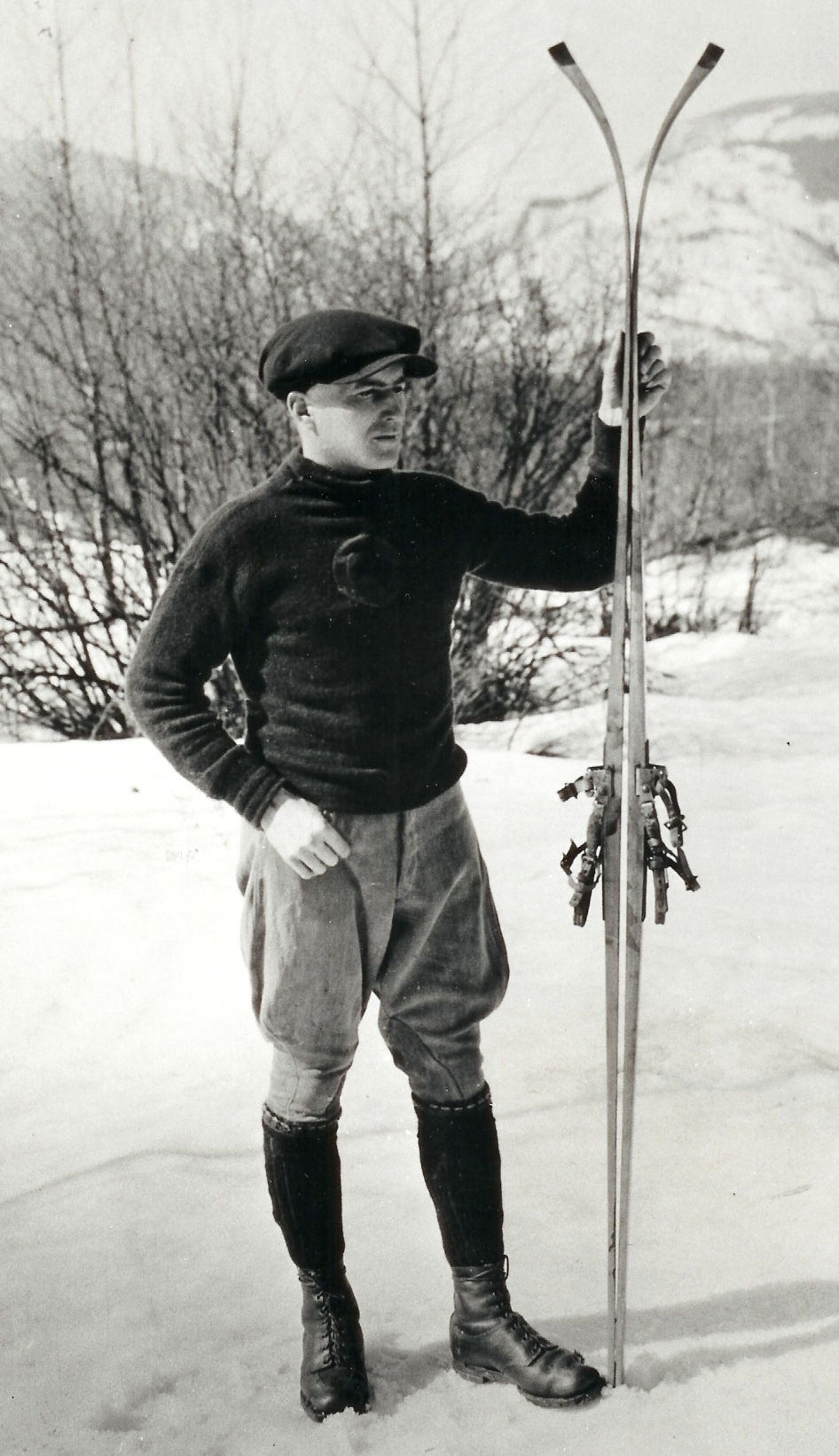
- Nels Nelsen in 1925

Personal information
- Nationality: Canada
- Born: 3 June 1894 Salangen, [Norway
- Died: 3 June 1943 (aged 49) Field, British Columbia, Canada

Sport
- Sport: Skiing

Achievements and titles
- Personal bests: 73.1 m (240 ft); Revelstoke, Canada (4 February 1925)

Nels Nelsen (3 June 1894 – 3 June 1943), born Nils Johan Nilsen and sometimes referred to as Nels Nelson, was a Norwegian-born Canadian ski jumper active between 1916 and 1932. Later he was ski jumping organizer. He was among the world's best ski jumpers during the 1920s, and held the world record of 73 meters from 1925 to 1930. He was born in Salangen Municipality in Troms county, Norway. He moved with his family to Revelstoke, British Columbia, in 1912. Credited with bringing the sport of ski jumping to Canada, he made his debut on the nearby Big Hill in 1915. He competed throughout Canada and the United States, and became Canadian champion five times. Despite holding the world record at the time, he was not allowed to participate in the 1928 Winter Olympics because the officials did not find it suitable for him to have to work his way to Switzerland.

Nelsen worked for the Canadian Pacific Railway, and moved to North Vancouver, British Columbia, where he raised a family. Nelsen lost his hand in a hunting accident in 1933, and was forced to retire as a ski jumper. He continued as an organizer, and was among other things president of the Western Canada Amateur Ski Association and later vice-president of the Canadian Amateur Ski Association. In 1948, after Big Hill had been expanded, it was renamed Nels Nelsen Hill. Nelsen was inscribed in the U.S. National Ski Hall of Fame in 1971 and the Canadian Ski Hall of Fame in 1983.

== Early and personal life ==
He was born Nils Johan Nilsen to a Norwegian family in Seljeskogen in Salangen Municipality on 3 June 1894, as the oldest of six children. As a child, Nelsen was an active skier and ski jumper, with more than fifteen ski jumps located in the area. In 1913, his family emigrated to Big Eddy near Revelstoke. Once in Canada, he anglicized his name. His brother, Ivind Nilsen was also a champion ski jumper, and became among other things Boy's World Champion in 1922. Ivind, who chose not to anglicize his last name, was known for his supreme style, while Nels was better known for his length. Nelsen married Emma Pickard, with whom he had ten children. Except for a brief period as a ski instructor, he worked as a brakeman and conductor for the Canadian Pacific Railway, whose flexibility made it easier to participate in tournaments. He moved to North Vancouver where he raised his 10 kids with his wife Emma Picard.

== Athletic career ==
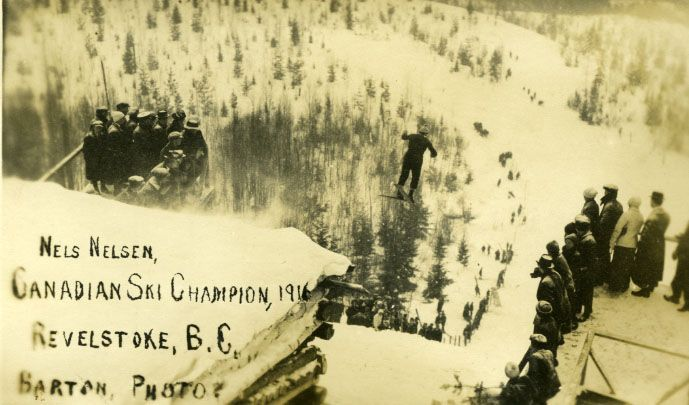
Nelsen during a jump in Big Hill in 1916

Nelsen won the home-town Winter Carnival Tournament, setting the hill record of 56 meters (183 ft) in Big Hill in the inauguration tournament in 1916. With this and subsequent better distances, he would hold the hill record in Revelstoke until 1932. In 1916, he won the Championship of Canada Ski Jumping Contest, which he would subsequently defend every year until 1920. He continued by setting the Canadian amateur record in 1920, and breaking it again in 1921 and 1923. He was among the most successful jumpers in Canada from 1916 to 1925, taking home most trophies. Among his methods to improve his jumps was placing pieces of lead at the front or back of the skies to give optimal balance.

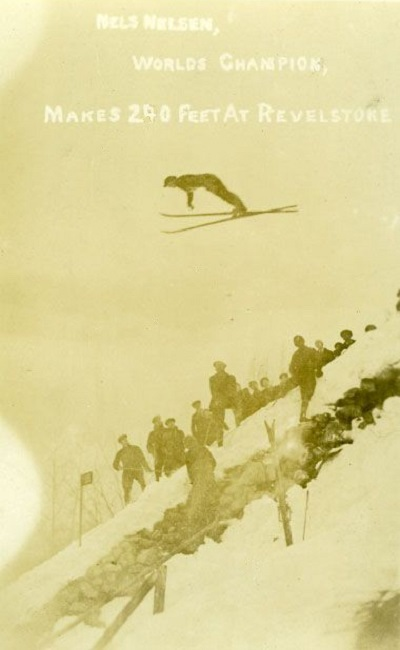
Nelsen as he sets the world record in 1925

Nelsen traveled throughout Canada and the United States to attend ski jumping competitions. In British Columbia, he attended competitions in Nelson, Trail, Rossland, Princeton, Kamloops, Sandon, Nakusp, Kimberley and Cranbrook. In Alberta, he attended tournaments in Calgary, Edmonton, Banff and Camrose; in eastern Canada in Ottawa and Montreal. In the United States, he attended events in Mount Rainier and Leavenworth in Washington; Dillon, Steamboat Springs and Denver in Colorado; Salt Lake City; and Brattleboro, Vermont. He became Canadian champion five times, in 1917, 1918, 1919, 1920 and 1922. His various best jumps were Canadian records from 1916 to 1932.

During the 1925 Winter Carnival Tournament, Nelsen, sick with influenza, set a world record at the Big Hill. Jumping 73 meters (240 ft), the record remained until it was broken by Adolph Badrut at Bernina-Roseg-Schanze in Switzerland in 1930, who jumped 75 meters (246 ft). However, Bob Lymburne was able to again claim the world record for the Big Hill, when he jumped 82 meters (269 ft) in 1932. Although accepted as a record, it was not at the time favored in Europe to stress distance records. This was because it was regarded that simply building a larger hill would undoubtedly give a longer jump, and in part because such records did not take style into consideration. Nelsen and Melbourne McKenzie planned to travel to St. Moritz, Switzerland, to attend the 1928 Winter Olympics, but lack of funding meant that they planned for work for their fare on a freighter. These plans were stopped by officials from the British delegation, who felt it was inappropriate and not fitting for the team, and Nelsen never competed in any Winter Olympics. Nelsen kept his amateur status, but did well against professionals those times he competed against them. During the winter of 1932, he worked as a ski instructor in Quebec. In a hunting accident in 1932, he lost a hand, and never jumped again.

== Organizer career and legacy ==
After arriving in Revelstoke, Nelsen was instrumental in the establishment of Revelstoke Ski Club and the Big Hill located within Mount Revelstoke National Park. In 1927, he helped establish a ski jump in Grouse Mountain in North Vancouver. After his accident, he started working to establish Field Ski Club in Field, British Columbia, where he spent time between trains. He promoted a strict adherence to the amateur code, and stated that debates regarding professionalism were disruptive for the United States National Ski Association.

Traditionally, governing of skiing in Canada was split between the Canadian Amateur Ski Association (CASA) and the Western Canada Amateur Ski Association (WCASA). Nelsen was the latter's president, and after years of rivalry, which even reached the point where they did not recognize each other, Nelsen eventually was part of the negotiation for an amalgamation which took into consideration the needs of the western clubs. Nelsen subsequently became vice-president of CASA from 1934.

He died of heart failure in Field on 3 June 1943—his 49th birthday. In 1948, after Big Hill had been expanded, it was renamed Nels Nelsen Hill. Nelsen was inscribed in the U.S. National Ski Hall of Fame in 1971, the Canadian Ski Hall of Fame in 1983, and the following year in the BC Sports Hall of Fame.

== Ski jumping world records ==
Date	Hill	Location	Metres	Feet
1 February 1916	Nels Nelsen Hill	Revelstoke, British Columbia, Canada	55.8	183
March 1923	Nels Nelsen Hill	Revelstoke, British Columbia, Canada	71.3	234
5 February 1924	Nels Nelsen Hill	Revelstoke, British Columbia, Canada	71.6	235
6 February 1924	Nels Nelsen Hill	Revelstoke, British Columbia, Canada	71.6	235
4 February 1925	Nels Nelsen Hill	Revelstoke, British Columbia, Canada	73.1	240

Not recognized! He stood at world record distance, but at the training.
Not recognized! Crash at world record distance.
