= Sophie Atkinson =

English painter

- Born: Sophia Mildred Atkinson; 28 November 1876; Newcastle upon Tyne, England
- Died: 5 May 1972 (aged 95); Edinburgh, Scotland
- Known for: Painting

Cover of An Artist in Corfu, 1911

Sophie Atkinson (28 November 1876 – 5 May 1972), born Sophia Mildred Atkinson, was an English watercolour landscape painter and illustrator.

== Biography ==
Atkinson was born at Newcastle upon Tyne, England, on 28 November 1876. She was the daughter of the painter Matthew Hutton Atkinson and the granddaughter of the painters George Clayton Atkinson and William Adamson. She received training in art at the Newcastle School of Art, at Armstrong College, Newcastle, under R.G. Hatton and later at the Sir Hubert von Herkomer School near London.

At the turn of the century Atkinson lived in Corfu; the result was the book An Artist in Corfu, published in 1911, which she wrote and illustrated with her own watercolours. It was a considerable success in both the UK and US. The book was later greatly admired by Lawrence Durrell, who had also spent some years in Corfu. He plagiarized several sections in his Prospero's Cell: A guide to the landscape and manners of the island of Corcyra (a fictionalized Corfu) of 1945.

After the Great War she travelled to India, and later also visited Denmark, Dresden and the Tyrol. After the death of the painter John Atkinson in 1924 she went to California and from there made her way to western Canada. Taking advantage of Canadian Pacific’s free passes to artists and writers, she travelled from British Columbia through Canada to Calgary, Ottawa and Montreal.

Atkinson settled in Revelstoke, British Columbia in 1949. She was an accomplished artist who painted still lifes, landscapes, and scenes of Indian villages, townscapes, and city scenes such as the Revelstoke railway yards. The Revelstoke Art Club was created by Atkinson in 1962. Her work received recognition at exhibitions in British Columbia, specifically at the Art Gallery of Greater Victoria (From March 31, 1949 to April 2, 1949), Montreal, Calgary and Revelstoke in Canada, and in London, England. She went back to Britain in about 1968, settling in Edinburgh, Scotland, where she died on 5 May 1972.
