= Revelstoke Secondary School =

Revelstoke Secondary

Location
- 1007 Vernon Avenue, PO Bag 5100; Revelstoke, British Columbia, V0E 2S0; Canada; 50.9918°N 118.2013°W

Information
- School type: Public, high school
- Opened: 1952; 2011 (new building)
- School board: School District 19 Revelstoke
- Superintendent: Glenn Goslin
- School number: 1919003
- Administrator: Ms. Roberta Kubik
- Principal: Greg Kenyon
- Staff: 41
- Grades: 8-12
- Enrollment: 400 (2025/2026)
- Language: English, French
- Colours: Red, white
- Team name: Avalanche
- Website: https://revelstokesecondary.sd19.bc.ca/
- Last updated: October 3, 2026

Revelstoke Secondary is the only public high school in Revelstoke, British Columbia part of School District 19 Revelstoke. In October 2011, a transition was made from the old school into a new 40 million dollar project, built directly beside the old building. The new school building is one of the most modern and environmentally friendly schools in Canada and includes a 275-seat theatre, an oversized gymnasium, a fitness room, a fully equipped library, two computer labs, woodwork and automotive shops, an art room, a drama facility, food services, a music/band room, science labs, a home economics area, and general student services spaces.

Revelstoke Secondary School (RSS) is known for its strong track and field team and athletic program which is complemented by a vibrant music and visual arts program. The students at RSS have above-average academic results as measured by the BC Ministry of Education, and most recently was tied for first among all the rural secondary schools in British Columbia.
