= Andrew Kozek =

Canadian ice hockey player (born 1986)

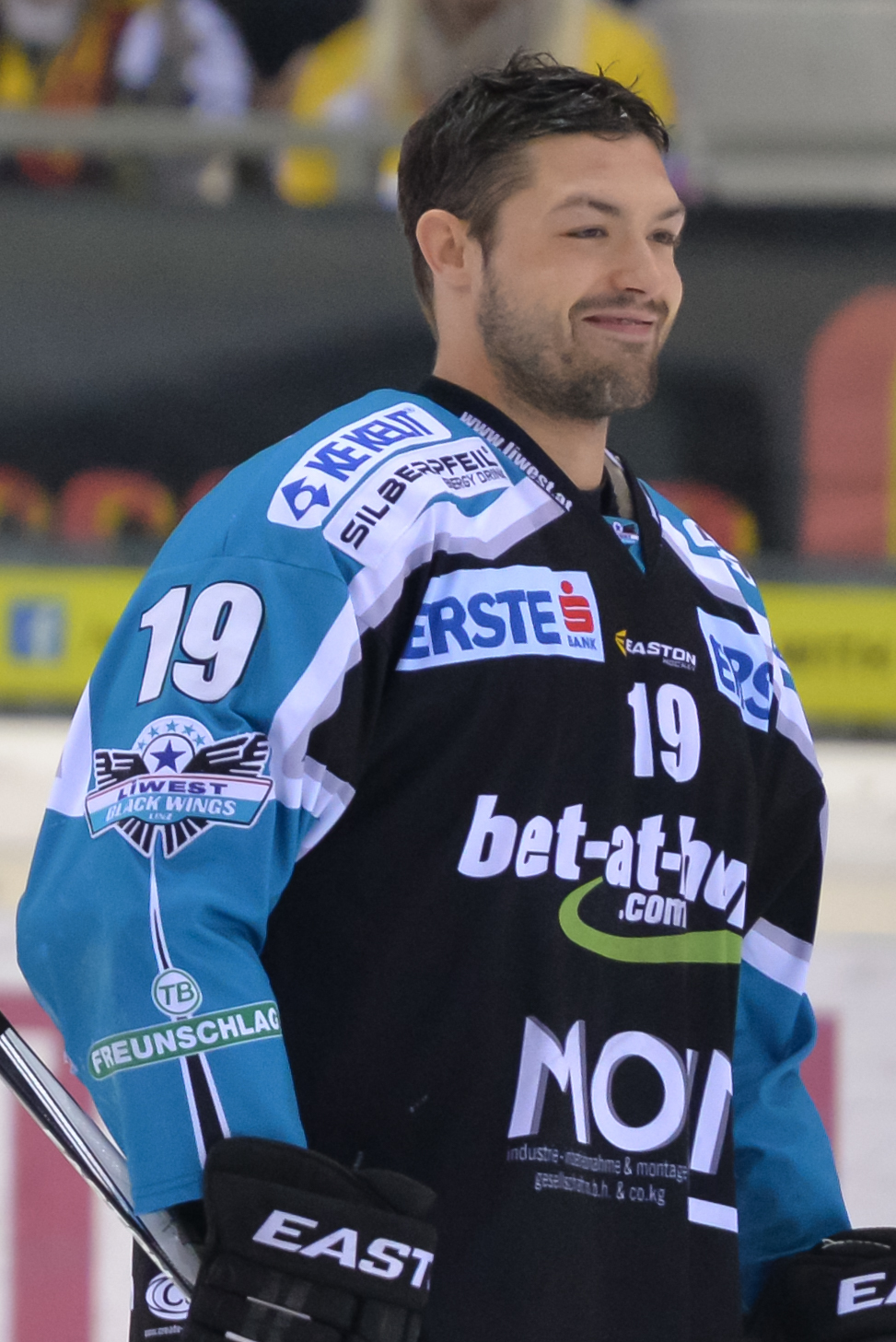
- Kozek with EHC Black Wings Linz in 2016
- Born: May 26, 1986 (age 40) Revelstoke, British Columbia, Canada
- Height: 5 ft 10 in (178 cm)
- Weight: 175 lb (79 kg; 12 st 7 lb)
- Position: Left wing
- Shot: Left
- Played for: Chicago Wolves; Hershey Bears; Nikko Ice Bucks; Dornbirner EC; EHC Black Wings Linz; Thomas Sabo Ice Tigers; Sport; Mora IK; EC KAC
- NHL draft: 53rd overall, 2005; Atlanta Thrashers
- Playing career: 2009–2021

Andrew Kozek (born May 26, 1986) is a Canadian former professional ice hockey player. Kozek was drafted 53rd overall by the Atlanta Thrashers in the 2005 NHL entry draft.

== Playing career ==
Kozek played collegiately at the University of North Dakota from 2005 to 2009. He helped UND capture the WCHA championship in 2006, followed by a trip to the NCAA Frozen Four, where the Fighting Sioux were defeated by Boston College. In 2007, UND again made it to the NCAA Frozen Four and again fells short in the semifinal against Boston College. Kozek reached a third NCAA Frozen Four with North Dakota in 2008, but for the third consecutive year the Fighting Hawks did not get passed BC in the semis. Kozek was named to the WCHA All-Academic Team his junior year.

After his NCAA career, Kozek played for the Chicago Wolves in the American Hockey League, seeing action in five games of the 2008–09 season. He then signed a deal with the Atlanta Thrashers and was assigned to their affiliate, the Chicago Wolves, where he made 126 AHL appearances. On March 7, 2011, Kozek was sent by the Thrashers on loan to the Hershey Bears, affiliate of the Washington Capitals, in exchange for Capitals prospect Josh Godfrey.

In the following season, Kozek embarked on his career abroad, first agreeing to a one-year stint in the Asia League Ice Hockey with the Nikko Ice Bucks. He then moved to the more competitive Austrian top-flight EBEL with Dornbirner EC for the 2012-13 campaign. He led the league in goalscoring that season, chipping in with 38 goals (plus 20 assists) in 54 games. After one year at Dornbirn, Kozek moved to EBEL rivals EHC Linz prior to the 2013–14 season. He led the Austrian top-flight in goals scored in 2012-13 and 2015–16.

In April 2016, Kozek penned a deal with the Nürnberg Ice Tigers of the German top-tier Deutsche Eishockey Liga (DEL).

== Career statistics ==
			Regular season					Playoffs
Season	Team	League	GP	G	A	Pts	PIM	GP	G	A	Pts	PIM
2002–03	Sicamous Eagles	KIJHL	46	25	27	52	88	—	—	—	—	—
2003–04	Surrey Eagles	BCHL	58	19	22	41	67	13	7	4	11	10
2004–05	Surrey Eagles	BCHL	60	48	49	97	81	26	19	10	29	49
2005–06	University of North Dakota	WCHA	46	7	6	13	22	—	—	—	—	—
2006–07	University of North Dakota	WCHA	41	5	6	11	12	—	—	—	—	—
2007–08	University of North Dakota	WCHA	42	18	3	21	18	—	—	—	—	—
2008–09	University of North Dakota	WCHA	38	8	12	20	40	—	—	—	—	—
2008–09	Chicago Wolves	AHL	5	2	0	2	2	—	—	—	—	—
2009–10	Chicago Wolves	AHL	69	12	11	23	36	7	0	1	1	0
2010–11	Chicago Wolves	AHL	57	7	5	12	43	—	—	—	—	—
2010–11	Hershey Bears	AHL	14	4	4	8	2	6	1	1	2	7
2011–12	Nikko Ice Bucks	ALH	36	27	13	40	76	9	3	2	5	24
2012–13	Dornbirner EC	EBEL	54	38	20	58	52	—	—	—	—	—
2013–14	EHC Liwest Black Wings Linz	EBEL	54	26	12	38	34	7	4	0	4	27
2014–15	EHC Liwest Black Wings Linz	EBEL	54	32	23	55	52	12	8	1	9	2
2015–16	EHC Liwest Black Wings Linz	EBEL	52	40	26	66	31	12	5	4	9	37
2016–17	Thomas Sabo Ice Tigers	DEL	50	16	12	28	45	4	0	0	0	2
2017–18	Sport	Liiga	7	2	0	2	4	—	—	—	—	—
2017–18	Mora IK	SHL	4	1	0	1	2	—	—	—	—	—
2017–18	EC KAC	EBEL	10	8	1	9	20	6	2	1	3	2
2018–19	EC KAC	EBEL	42	18	9	27	22	15	7	7	14	16
2019–20	EC KAC	EBEL	47	17	7	24	47	3	4	1	5	0
2020–21	Black Wings 1992	ICEHL	38	6	4	10	12	—	—	—	—	—
2020–21	Ravensburg Towerstars	GER.2	15	5	5	10	8	6	3	2	5	2
AHL totals			145	25	20	45	83	13	1	2	3	7
AUT totals			351	185	102	287	270	55	30	14	44	84
