= Revelstoke Airport =

- IATA: YRV; ICAO: CYRV; WMO: 71882

Summary
- Airport type: Public
- Operator: Columbia-Shuswap Regional District
- Location: Revelstoke, British Columbia
- Time zone: PST (UTC−08:00)
  - Summer (DST): PDT (UTC−07:00)
- Elevation AMSL: 1,457 ft / 444 m
- Coordinates: 50°57′44″N 118°11′04″W
- Website: Revelstoke Airport

Map
- Location in British Columbia

Runways
Direction	Length		Surface
Direction	ft	m	Surface
12/30	5,155	1,571	Asphalt
- Source: Canada Flight Supplement; Environment Canada

Revelstoke Airport (IATA: YRV, ICAO: CYRV) is located 1.7 nautical miles (3.1 km; 2.0 mi) south southeast of Revelstoke, British Columbia, Canada.

== Expansion plan ==
On December 7, 2011, the Columbia-Shuswap Regional District (CRSD) announced an expansion plan for the airport. While some parts of the plan are still preliminary and tentatively scheduled to take place over the course of the next few years, such as the extension of the runway, some other improvements in the Revelstoke Airport expansion include the upgrading of the terminal building and improving the airport's navigational systems. A 110 m (355 ft) runway extension was undertaken in 2014.

If the expansion of the airport were to take place, the projected cost would be about $765,000. $365,000 would come from the city's Resort Municipality Initiative funding, with the other $400,000 coming from the CSRD, although the latter funds would require the approval from the CSRD board.

The plan is to attract regular charters to bring tourists to Revelstoke and eventually develop the airport to implement regular commercial flights from other cities.

In the 2016/2017 ski season, Pacific Coastal Airlines planned to operate a scheduled charter flight service to the airport for ski travelers.
