= Bruce Holloway (ice hockey) =

Canadian ice hockey player

- Born: June 27, 1963 (age 62) Revelstoke, British Columbia, Canada
- Height: 6 ft 0 in (183 cm)
- Weight: 200 lb (91 kg; 14 st 4 lb)
- Position: Defence
- Shot: Left
- Played for: AHL; Fredericton Express; St. Catharines Saints; IHL; Kalamazoo Wings; Peoria Rivermen; NHL; Vancouver Canucks
- NHL draft: 136th overall, 1981; Vancouver Canucks
- Playing career: 1983–1986

Bruce Holloway (born June 27, 1963) is a Canadian former professional ice hockey defenceman. Holloway played in two games with the Vancouver Canucks in the 1984–85 NHL season.

== Early life ==
Born in Revelstoke, British Columbia, Holloway played with the local Revelstoke Bruins of the BCJHL. He then moved on to the WHL, where he played for four teams.

== Career ==
Holloway was drafted 136th overall by the Vancouver Canucks in 1981. Holloway's professional ice hockey debut was with the American Hockey League's Fredericton Express during the 1983–84 AHL season.

== Personal life ==
Holloway's son, Dylan Holloway was drafted 14th overall in the 2020 NHL Draft by the Edmonton Oilers.

== Career statistics ==
=== Regular season and playoffs ===
| | | | Regular season | | | | | Playoffs |
| Season | Team | League | GP | G | A | Pts | PIM | GP | G | A | Pts | PIM |
|---|---|---|---|---|---|---|---|---|---|---|---|---|
| 1978–79 | Revelstoke Bruins | BCJHL | 61 | 4 | 14 | 18 | 52 | — | — | — | — | — |
| 1978–79 | Billings Bighorns | WHL | 9 | 0 | 1 | 1 | 0 | 4 | 0 | 0 | 0 | 0 |
| 1979–80 | Melville Millionaires | SJHL | 9 | 3 | 2 | 5 | 10 | — | — | — | — | — |
| 1979–80 | Billings Bighorns | WHL | 49 | 1 | 9 | 10 | 6 | — | — | — | — | — |
| 1980–81 | Billings Bighorns | WHL | 2 | 0 | 2 | 2 | 0 | — | — | — | — | — |
| 1980–81 | Regina Pats | WHL | 67 | 6 | 27 | 33 | 61 | 11 | 2 | 5 | 7 | 4 |
| 1981–82 | Regina Pats | WHL | 69 | 4 | 28 | 32 | 111 | 2 | 0 | 2 | 2 | 17 |
| 1982–83 | Brandon Wheat Kings | WHL | 7 | 0 | 5 | 5 | 8 | — | — | — | — | — |
| 1982–83 | Kamloops Junior Oilers | WHL | 51 | 16 | 53 | 69 | 82 | 7 | 1 | 4 | 5 | 6 |
| 1983–84 | Fredericton Express | AHL | 66 | 3 | 30 | 33 | 29 | 5 | 0 | 0 | 0 | 0 |
| 1984–85 | Fredericton Express | AHL | 31 | 2 | 4 | 6 | 16 | — | — | — | — | — |
| 1984–85 | St. Catharines Saints | AHL | 13 | 1 | 0 | 1 | 0 | — | — | — | — | — |
| 1984–85 | Vancouver Canucks | NHL | 2 | 0 | 0 | 0 | 0 | — | — | — | — | — |
| 1985–86 | Kalamazoo Wings | IHL | 38 | 7 | 11 | 18 | 45 | — | — | — | — | — |
| 1985–86 | Peoria Rivermen | IHL | 29 | 4 | 13 | 17 | 47 | 7 | 2 | 3 | 5 | 2 |
| NHL totals | | | 2 | 0 | 0 | 0 | 0 | — | — | — | — | — |
