= Harry Lien =

American ski jumper

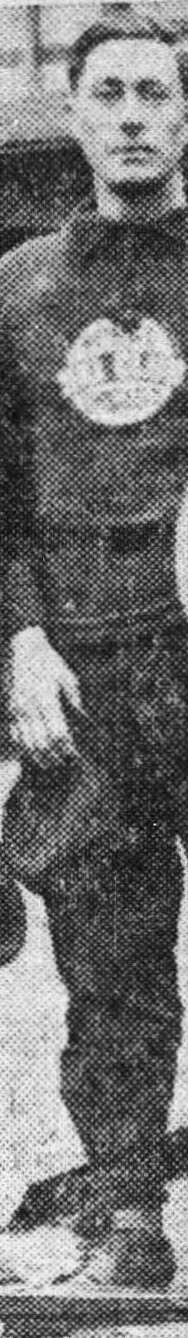

Personal information
- Nationality: United States
- Born: April 5, 1896 Tvedestrand, Sweden-Norway
- Died: September 19, 1978 (aged 82) Park Ridge, Illinois, US

Sport
- Sport: Skiing

Halvard Harry Lien (April 5, 1896 – September 19, 1978) was an American ski jumper and a member of the US National Ski Hall of Fame who competed in the 1924 Winter Olympics in Chamonix, France.

He learned to ski and jump in his native Norway, moved to the United States when he was 20. He joined the U.S Army in 1917, serving for twenty months and was discharged in 1919. His skiing career went from 1919 to 1933 although he did participate in the 1937 Norge Annual Meet as a last hurrah, placing second.

In 1969, he was elected to the US Ski Association's Hall of Fame in Ishpeming, Michigan.
