= Bob Lymburne =

Canadian ski jumper

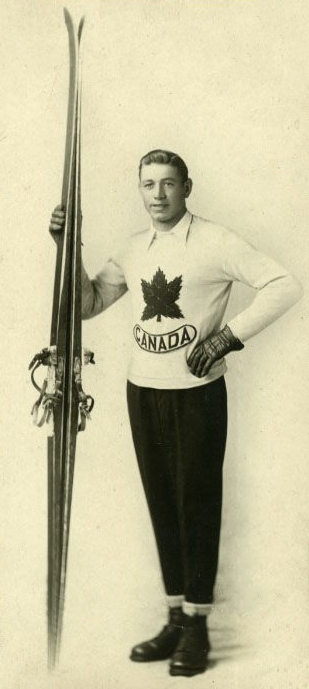
- Bob Lymburne in 1932

Personal information
- Born: 30 July 1909 Fort William, Ontario, Canada

Sport
- Sport: Skiing

Robert Lymburne (born 30 July 1909, date of death unknown) was a Canadian ski jumper.

== Early life ==
Bob Lymburne was born 30 July 1909 in Fort William, Ontario. He moved to Revelstoke, British Columbia, as a child where he received his first pair of skis at age thirteen.

== Career ==
Lymburne competed in the individual event at the 1932 Winter Olympics. In 1935, he suffered a severe head injury while ski jumping. At some point after 1957, he wandered into the woods and was not seen again.

== Ski jumping world records ==
Date	Hill	Location	Metres	Feet
12 March 1932	Nels Nelsen Hill	Revelstoke, Canada	82	269
March 1933	Nels Nelsen Hill	Revelstoke, Canada	87.5	287

Not recognized. Stood at world record distance at unofficial competition. Amateur WR.

== See also ==
- List of people who disappeared
