= Revelstoke, British Columbia =

City in British Columbia, Canada

Revelstoke Ktunwakanmituk Miȼ’qaqas (Kootenay)
- City of Revelstoke
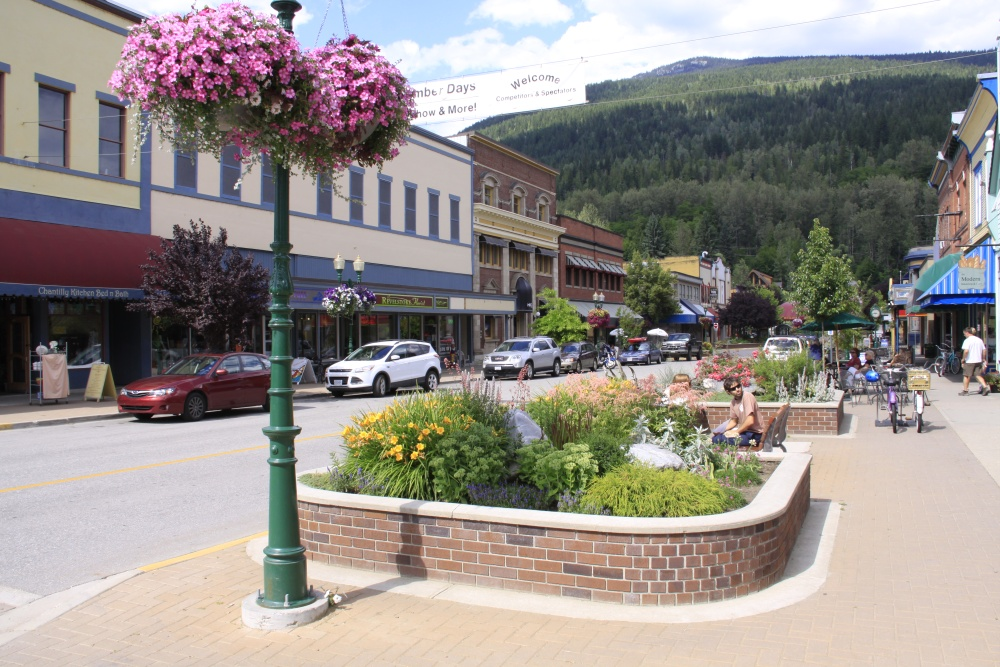
- Mackenzie Avenue
- Nicknames: Revy, The Stoke, Revelstuck
- Location of Revelstoke Revelstoke (Canada)
- Coordinates: 50°59′53″N 118°11′44″W
- Country: Canada
- Province: British Columbia
- Regional District: Columbia-Shuswap
- Founded: 1880
- Incorporated: 1899

Government
  - Mayor: Taha Attiah
  - Governing Body: Revelstoke City Council

Area
  - Total: 40.76 km^{2} (15.74 sq mi)
- Elevation: 480 m (1,570 ft)

Population (2021)
  - Total: 8,275
  - Density: 622.8/km^{2} (1,613/sq mi)
- Time zone: UTC−07:00 (Pacific Time)
- Postal code span: V0E 2S0 & 3S0
- Area codes: 250, 778, 236, 672
- Highways: Trans-Canada Highway (Highway 1); Highway 23
- Website: revelstoke.ca

Revelstoke (/ˈrɛvəlstoʊk/) is a city in southeastern British Columbia, Canada, with a census population of 8,275 in 2021. Revelstoke is located 641 kilometres (398 mi) east of Vancouver, and 415 kilometres (258 mi) west of Calgary, Alberta. The city is situated on the banks of the Columbia River just south of the Revelstoke Dam and near its confluence with the Illecillewaet River. East of Revelstoke are the Selkirk Mountains and Glacier National Park, penetrated by Rogers Pass used by the Trans-Canada Highway and the Canadian Pacific Railway. South of the community down the Columbia River are the Arrow Lakes, Mount Begbie, and the Kootenays.

== History ==
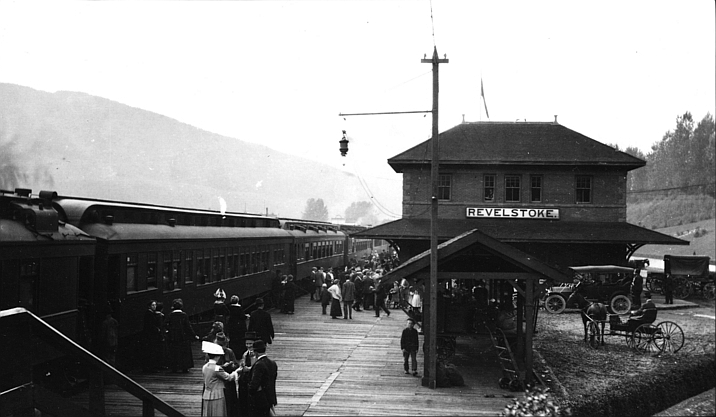
Railway station, 1915

Revelstoke was founded in the 1880s when the Canadian Pacific Railway (CPR) was built through the area; mining was an important early industry. The name was originally Farwell, after a local land owner and surveyor. In yet earlier days, the spot was called the "Second Crossing" to differentiate it from the first crossing of the Columbia River by the Canadian Pacific Railway at Donald. The city was named by the Canadian Pacific Railway in appreciation of Lord Revelstoke, head of Baring Brothers & Co., the UK investment bank that, in partnership with Glyn, Mills & Co., saved the Canadian Pacific Railway from bankruptcy in the summer of 1885 by buying the company's unsold bonds, enabling the railway to reach completion. The post office dates from 1886.

The construction of the Trans-Canada Highway in 1962 further eased access to the region, and since then, tourism has been an important feature of the local economy, with skiing having emerged as the most prominent attraction. Mount Revelstoke National Park is just north of the town. The construction of Revelstoke Mountain Resort, a major new ski resort on Mount MacKenzie, just outside town, has been underway since late 2005 and first opened during the 2007-2008 ski season. Revelstoke is also the site of a railway museum.

Revelstoke is situated in prime black bear and grizzly bear habitat. In 1994, the Revelstoke garbage dump was fenced with an electric fence, preventing bears from feeding on the garbage. The population of bears that had been feeding at the dump turned to town to forage for food, and many were destroyed as "nuisance bears." The destruction of so many bears led to the creation of an education program meant to keep bears wild and the community safe.

Revelstoke holds the Canadian record for the snowiest single winter. 2,447 centimetres (963 in) of snow fell on Mt. Copeland outside town during the winter of 1971–72. 963 inches works out to just over 80 feet of snow. The townsite received 779 centimetres (307 in), and snow levels were higher than many roofs around town by more than a few metres.

== Economy ==
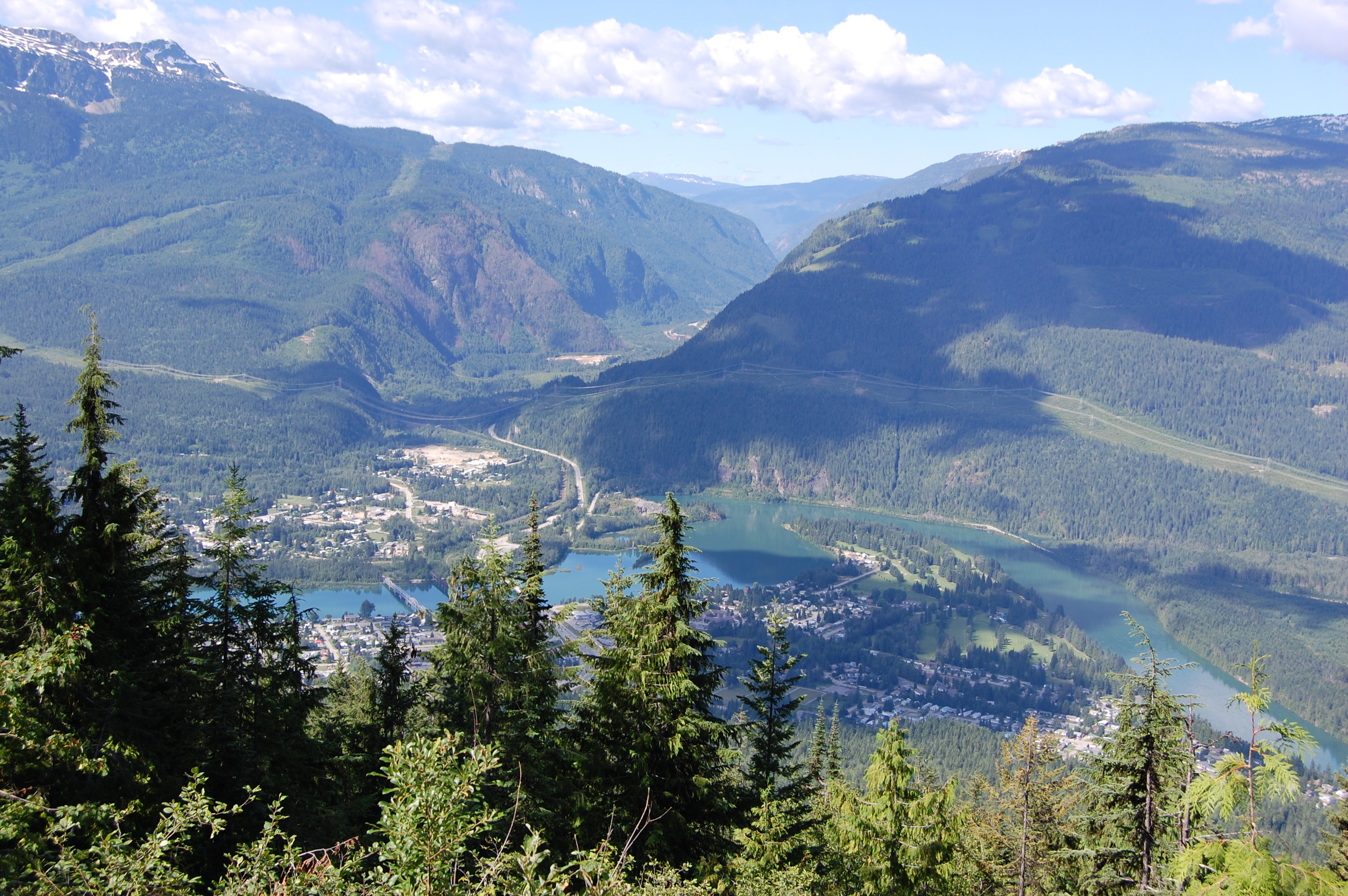
Revelstoke from Mount Revelstoke National Park

Revelstoke's economy has traditionally been tied to the Canadian Pacific Railway, and it still maintains a strong connection to that industry. However, forestry, construction, tourism, and retail have increased over the past decades. The Revelstoke Railway Museum is a recognition of the town's continued attachment to the Canadian Pacific Railway and continues to be an important tourist attraction.

Revelstoke is also the location of the Revelstoke Dam, which was constructed on the Columbia River and completed in 1984. In 1986, to offset the economic effects of the completed hydroelectric project and the temporary closure of the local sawmill, the City of Revelstoke undertook a downtown revitalization program, which was completed with marked success.

The city is served by Revelstoke Airport.

A small ski resort featuring a single short lift has operated on Mount MacKenzie since the 1960s, and snowcat skiing was offered for higher altitudes. A strong movement pushed to expand the entire mountain into a single resort, and construction started in the early 2000s. Revelstoke Mountain Resort opened in the winter of 2007/8 and boasts North America's greatest vertical at 1,713 metres (5,620 ft). The resort also offers 3,121 acres of fall line skiing, high alpine bowls, 13 areas of gladed terrain and more groomed terrain. Revelstoke Mountain Resort was also the only resort world-wide to offer lift, cat, heli and backcountry skiing from one village base. Though economic conditions starting in late 2008 have deferred its initial plans, the resort will continue development with new lifts, hotels/condos, and a golf course in partnership with Cabot set to open in 2027.

== Transportation ==
The Trans-Canada automobile highway goes through Revelstoke.

Revelstoke is connected to Canadian Pacific Kansas City's railway network.

Until 1968, Canadian Pacific Railway serviced a branch line to the southeast, to Arrowhead and further through steamboat connections, which was abandoned in preparation for the filling of Hugh Keenleyside Dam. At the site of the former railway bridge crossing the Illecillewaet river out of Revelstoke a new pedestrian bridge was installed in 2011. This Mark Kingsbury Memorial Bridge now connects the town with the Illecillewaet Green Belt conservation area.

The city is served by Revelstoke Airport.

== Demographics ==
In the 2021 Census of Population conducted by Statistics Canada, Revelstoke had a population of 8,275 living in 3,354 of its 3,739 total private dwellings, a change of 9.4% from its 2016 population of 7,562. With a land area of 41.28 km^{2} (15.94 sq mi), it had a population density of 200.5/km^{2} (519.2/sq mi) in 2021.

=== Ethnicity ===
Panethnic groups in the City of Revelstoke (2001−2021)
Panethnic group	2021		2016		2011		2006		2001	
Panethnic group	Pop.	%	Pop.	%	Pop.	%	Pop.	%	Pop.	%
European (Note: Statistic includes all persons that did not make up part of a visible minority or an Indigenous identity.)	7,245	88.52%	6,720	90.26%	6,385	90.44%	6,805	95.04%	6,975	93.88%
Indigenous	400	4.89%	410	5.51%	395	5.59%	215	3%	220	2.96%
East Asian (Note: Statistic includes total responses of "Chinese", "Korean", and "Japanese" under visible minority section on census.)	160	1.95%	130	1.75%	150	2.12%	75	1.05%	95	1.28%
South Asian	135	1.65%	70	0.94%	50	0.71%	25	0.35%	25	0.34%
Southeast Asian (Note: Statistic includes total responses of "Filipino" and "Southeast Asian" under visible minority section on census.)	85	1.04%	75	1.01%	35	0.5%	15	0.21%	20	0.27%
Middle Eastern (Note: Statistic includes total responses of "West Asian" and "Arab" under visible minority section on census.)	55	0.67%	0	0%	0	0%	0	0%	0	0%
Latin American	45	0.55%	10	0.13%	0	0%	0	0%	80	1.08%
African	30	0.37%	15	0.2%	35	0.5%	25	0.35%	10	0.13%
Other/multiracial (Note: Statistic includes total responses of "Visible minority, n.i.e." and "Multiple visible minorities" under visible minority section on census.)	20	0.24%	20	0.27%	0	0%	0	0%	0	0%
Total responses	8,185	98.91%	7,445	98.45%	7,060	98.89%	7,160	99.03%	7,430	99.07%
Total population	8,275	100%	7,562	100%	7,139	100%	7,230	100%	7,500	100%
Note: Totals greater than 100% due to multiple origin responses.

=== Religion ===
According to the 2021 census, religious groups in Revelstoke included:

- Irreligion (5,645 persons or 69.0%)
- Christianity (2,265 persons or 27.7%)
- Islam (55 persons or 0.7%)
- Buddhism (40 persons or 0.5%)
- Hinduism (40 persons or 0.5%)
- Sikhism (35 persons or 0.4%)
- Judaism (10 persons or 0.1%)
- Other (95 persons or 1.2%)

== Sports ==
Revelstoke has produced some talented athletes in winter sports, notably ice hockey.

The former local BCJHL team, the Revelstoke Bruins, had a number of future NHLers on its roster in the 1970s and 1980s, including Bruce Holloway, Ron Flockhart, and Rudy Poeschek. The current Revelstoke Kootenay International Junior Hockey League team is the Revelstoke Grizzlies, the former KIJHL team of locally born Aaron Volpatti. Another notable professional hockey player for the Austrian Hockey League is Andrew Kozek, who was also born in Revelstoke.

Norwegian immigrants brought skiing and ski jumping to Revelstoke, and by the 1910s, several ski jumping hills had been built around the town. Revelstoke Ski Club was founded in 1914 and, by the following year, had reached 102 members. The pinnacle of the club was the annual Winter Carnival Tournament. The first tournament was held in 1915 and had, in addition to cross-country skiing competitions, ski jumping competitions for boys under 16 and the title of Champion of British Columbia. Nels Nelsen Hill, first known as Big Hill, opened in 1916. Revelstoke became an international center for ski jumping, attracting the world elite for the annual tournament. Revelstoke's own Nels Nelsen set the world records in the hill, at 73 meters (240 ft) in 1925 and 82 meters (269 ft) set by Bob Lymburne in 1932. The hill was completely renovated by 1948, leading to further international tournaments. The town even considered placing a bid for the 1968 Winter Olympics. However, throughout the 1960s, the interest in ski jumping was declining, with subsequent consequences for the number of spectators. The last tournament was held in 1975.

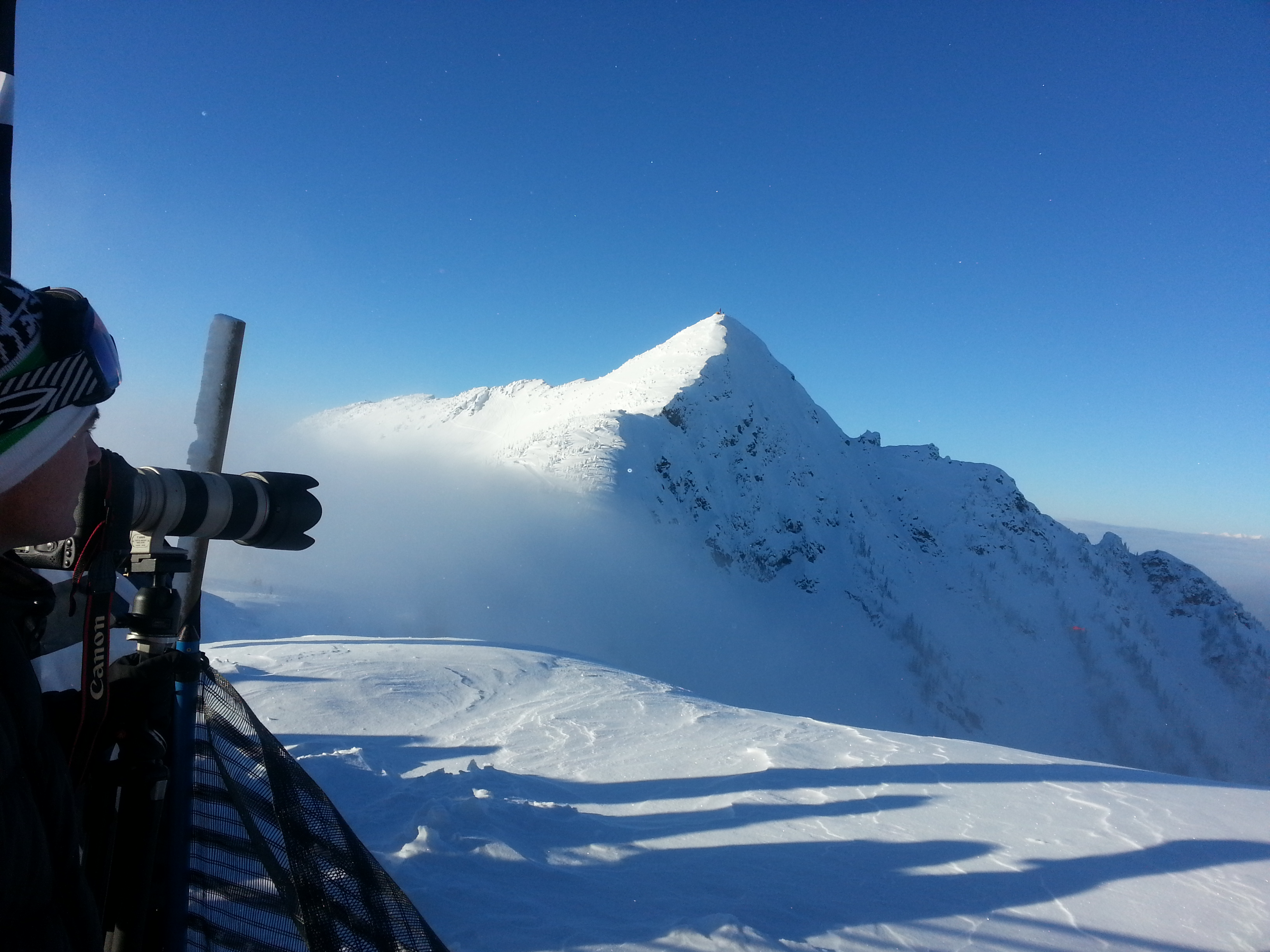
Revelstoke Free-ride World Tour

Due to the heavy snowfall in the area, Revelstoke is home to four heli-skiing and two cat-skiing operations. There are numerous backcountry skiing lodges in the area. Revelstoke is also a major snowmobiling destination.

In the summer, mountain biking, rock climbing, whitewater rafting and kayaking are popular activities.

In 2010, Revelstoke became part of a select group of ski resorts to feature the Freeskiing World Tour. After a successful trial of combining European and North American skiing tours starting with Revelstoke in 2012, the Swatch Freeride World Tour, Freeskiing World Tour and The North Face Masters of Snowboarding announced a merger that combined all three tours under one unified global 5-star championship series. The six-stop world tour, named the Swatch Freeride World Tour by the North Face, includes freeride skiing and snowboarding at each stop, starting with Revelstoke, Canada and ending with Verbier, Switzerland.

Revelstoke has hosted the Red Bull Cold Rush since 2015, a fusion of backcountry slopestyle, big mountain, cliffs, and alpine ski touring. Skiers compete for a $36,000 prize, given to the athletes deemed most well-rounded in a peer-judged format.

In 2011, Revelstoke locals Michael Curran and Stephanie Ells formed the "Revelstoke Roller Derby Association." The league's premier team, the Derailers, held its debut bouts in the summer of 2012 and won both home games.

Club	League	Sport	Venue	Established	Championships
Revelstoke Grizzlies	KIJHL	Ice Hockey	Revelstoke Forum	1993	4

== Education ==
School District 19 Revelstoke operates public schools in Revelstoke and surrounding areas.

The Conseil scolaire francophone de la Colombie-Britannique operates one Francophone school: école des Glaciers primary school.

== Films ==
The 1937 British movie The Great Barrier, starring Lilli Palmer, depicted the building of the Canadian Pacific Railway and featured location shooting from Revelstoke.

Some scenes in the 1999 action thriller Double Jeopardy, starring Ashley Judd and Tommy Lee Jones, were filmed in Revelstoke, notably the historic courthouse.

The Barber (2001), starring Malcolm McDowell, was almost entirely filmed in Revelstoke and features the town name displaced as Revelstoke, Alaska.

In 2017, the Hallmark Channel original movie Frozen in Love, starring Rachael Leigh Cook and Niall Matter, was filmed in the area.

== Climate ==
Revelstoke experiences a humid continental climate (Köppen Dfb). Summers are generally warm and rainy with cool nights, while winters are cold, snowy and very cloudy. Revelstoke on average experiences 50.3 days below 0 °C (32 °F), 13.5 days above 30 °C (86 °F) and one day above 35 °C (95 °F). The highest single-day snowfall recorded was 60.2 cm (23.7 in) and occurred on December 10, 1980, and the highest-ever snow depth recorded was 173 cm (68.1 in) and occurred on February 15, 1982. The highest temperature ever recorded in Revelstoke was 40.6 °C (105 °F) on July 17, 1941. The coldest temperature ever recorded was −34.4 °C (−30 °F) on January 11, 1909, January 20, 1935 and January 18, 1943.

Climate data for Revelstoke Airport, 1981–2010 normals, extremes 1898–present
Month	Jan	Feb	Mar	Apr	May	Jun	Jul	Aug	Sep	Oct	Nov	Dec	Year
Record high °C (°F)	11.7 (53.1)	12.8 (55.0)	22.2 (72.0)	28.3 (82.9)	37.2 (99.0)	40.1 (104.2)	40.6 (105.1)	38.3 (100.9)	37.2 (99.0)	25.6 (78.1)	17.2 (63.0)	11.1 (52.0)	40.6 (105.1)
Mean daily maximum °C (°F)	−0.9 (30.4)	1.1 (34.0)	7.2 (45.0)	13.6 (56.5)	19.7 (67.5)	22.9 (73.2)	25.1 (77.2)	24.5 (76.1)	18.4 (65.1)	10.6 (51.1)	3.3 (37.9)	−1.3 (29.7)	12.0 (53.6)
Daily mean °C (°F)	−3.5 (25.7)	−2.2 (28.0)	2.5 (36.5)	7.8 (46.0)	12.9 (55.2)	16.4 (61.5)	18.3 (64.9)	17.9 (64.2)	12.7 (54.9)	6.8 (44.2)	1.0 (33.8)	−3.6 (25.5)	7.3 (45.1)
Mean daily minimum °C (°F)	−6.2 (20.8)	−5.5 (22.1)	−2.3 (27.9)	1.9 (35.4)	6.1 (43.0)	9.9 (49.8)	11.5 (52.7)	11.3 (52.3)	7.0 (44.6)	3.0 (37.4)	−1.3 (29.7)	−6.0 (21.2)	2.5 (36.5)
Record low °C (°F)	−34.4 (−29.9)	−32.2 (−26.0)	−27.2 (−17.0)	−15.0 (5.0)	−6.7 (19.9)	−1.7 (28.9)	0.6 (33.1)	−6.1 (21.0)	−6.7 (19.9)	−12.7 (9.1)	−23.6 (−10.5)	−32.8 (−27.0)	−34.4 (−29.9)
Average precipitation mm (inches)	107.9 (4.25)	80.4 (3.17)	61.6 (2.43)	66.5 (2.62)	58.1 (2.29)	75.2 (2.96)	72.5 (2.85)	66.6 (2.62)	55.5 (2.19)	84.2 (3.31)	118.3 (4.66)	103.7 (4.08)	950.5 (37.42)
Average rainfall mm (inches)	20.8 (0.82)	27.7 (1.09)	43.7 (1.72)	62.2 (2.45)	58.1 (2.29)	75.2 (2.96)	72.5 (2.85)	66.6 (2.62)	55.5 (2.19)	82.5 (3.25)	62.3 (2.45)	22.3 (0.88)	649.3 (25.56)
Average snowfall cm (inches)	112.5 (44.3)	67.9 (26.7)	21.5 (8.5)	4.3 (1.7)	0.0 (0.0)	0.0 (0.0)	0.0 (0.0)	0.0 (0.0)	0.0 (0.0)	1.7 (0.7)	62.4 (24.6)	110.6 (43.5)	381.0 (150.0)
Average precipitation days (≥ 0.2 mm)	19.0	15.5	14.5	16.1	14.1	16.1	14.9	13.2	11.2	15.1	20.6	17.9	188.2
Average rainy days (≥ 0.2 mm)	5.9	7.3	12.3	15.8	14.1	16.1	14.9	13.2	11.2	14.9	13.9	5.1	144.8
Average snowy days (≥ 0.2 cm)	16.9	11.1	4.5	1.4	0.0	0.0	0.0	0.0	0.0	0.6	10.7	16.7	62.1
Average relative humidity (%)	82.4	76.7	63.3	49.3	44.8	46.8	50.8	53.1	59.1	70.6	82.2	82.3	63.5
Mean monthly sunshine hours	29.6	57.8	125.1	157.6	209.0	213.4	241.6	233.7	168.6	88.4	32.9	25.1	1,582.7
Percentage possible sunshine	11.3	20.6	34.0	38.1	43.5	43.3	48.6	51.8	44.3	26.5	12.2	10.1	32.0
Source: Environment Canada

== Neighbourhoods ==
There are 15 officially recognized neighbourhoods within the City of Revelstoke:

- Arrow Heights
- Big Eddy
- Central Business
- Central Revelstoke
- Clearview Heights
- Columbia Park
- CPR Hill
- Farwell/Mountain View
- Highway Corridor
- Kelly Flats/Dalles
- Resort Lands
- South Revelstoke
- Johnson Heights
- Thomas Brook
- Westside Road

== Notable people ==
- Sophie Atkinson — English watercolour landscape painter and illustrator
- Douglas Boyle — Canadian Forces officer
- Buck Crump — Canadian businessman
- Bruce Holloway — Canadian former professional ice hockey defenceman
- William Stewart King —former British Columbia politician
- Andrew Kozek — former professional ice hockey player
- Peter Morales — American former president of the Unitarian Universalist Association
- John Nunziata — Canadian lawyer and former politician
- Sid Parker — former New Democratic Party member of the House of Commons of Canada
- Thomas Scott — Canadian military figure, Manitoba Member of the Legislative Assembly, Member of Parliament
- Robert Fletcher Shaw — Canadian businessman, academic, civil servant
- Aaron Volpatti — former professional ice hockey winger

== See also ==
- List of francophone communities in British Columbia
- Revelstoke Secondary School

== Sources ==
- Canadian Railway Hall of Fame
- Ziegler, Philip (1988). The Sixth Great Power: Barings 1762–1929. London: Collins. ISBN 0-00-217508-8.
