= Mount Revelstoke National Park =

National park in British Columbia, Canada

- Parc national du Mont-Revelstoke
- IUCN category II (national park)
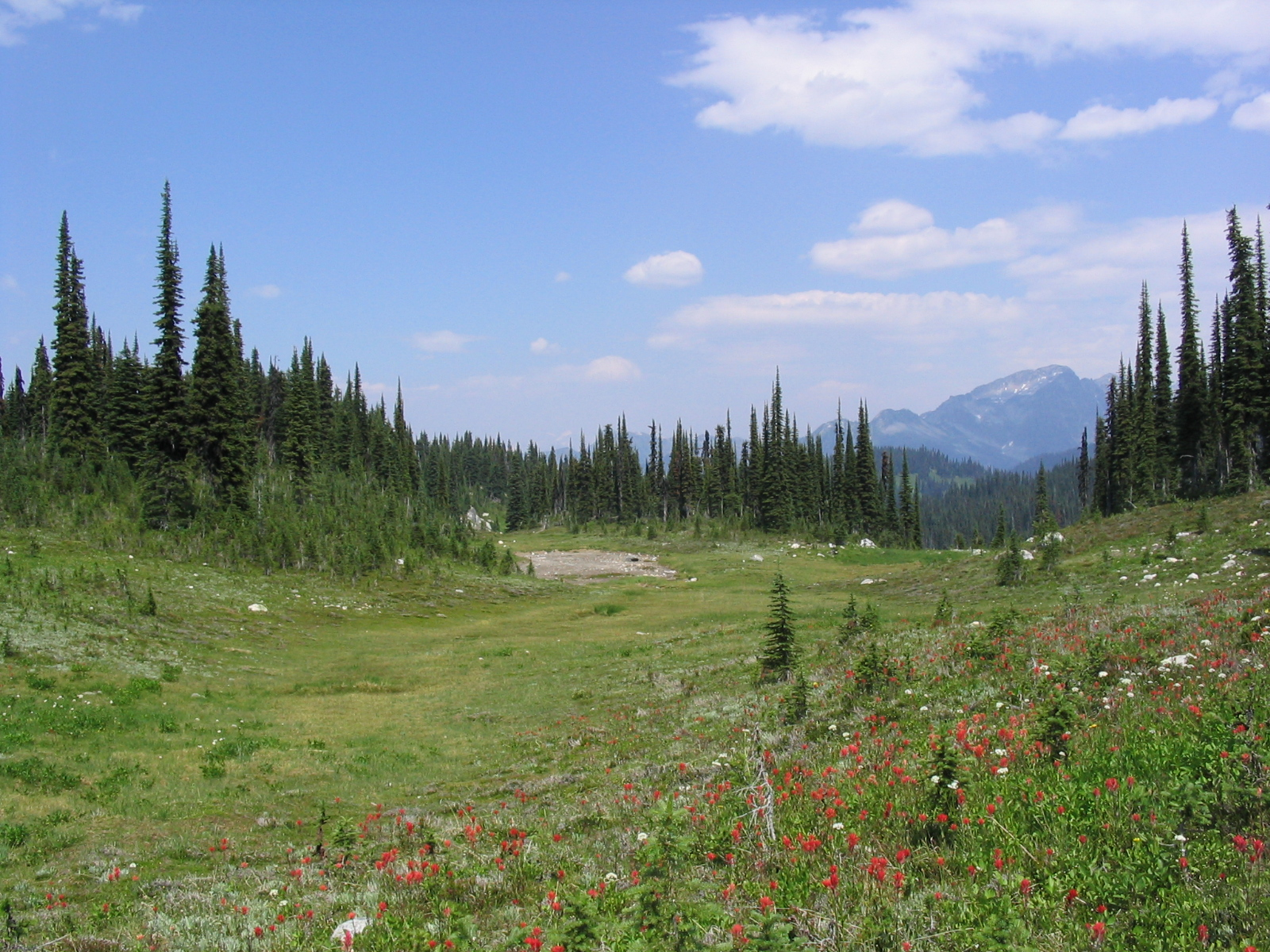
- Meadow near the summit

- Location within Canada Location within British Columbia
- Interactive map of Mount Revelstoke National Park
- Location: Revelstoke, British Columbia, Canada
- Coordinates: 51°05′09″N 118°03′56″W
- Area: 260 km^{2} (100 sq mi)
- Established: 1914
- Visitors: 775,190 (in 2022–23)
- Governing body: Parks Canada
- Website: parks.canada.ca/pn-np/bc/revelstoke

Mount Revelstoke National Park is a national park located adjacent to the city of Revelstoke, British Columbia, Canada. The park is relatively small for a national park, covering 260 km^{2} (100 sq mi). It is located in the Selkirk Mountains and was founded in 1914. Approximately 600,000 visitors enter Mount Revelstoke and nearby Glacier National Park each year.

== History ==
Mount Revelstoke is part of a string of mountain national parks along the Canadian Pacific Railway corridor including Banff, Yoho, and Glacier. Established in 1914, its creation came later than the other mountain national parks which date to the 1880s. The initiative to establish a park was led by local residents of Revelstoke; the mountaineering and skiing clubs worked with municipal officials and the local Progress Club to build the first trail to the summit of Mount Revelstoke in 1910. Park boundaries were extended southward toward the Revelstoke townsite in 1920. A lodge and tea house, known as Heather Lake Lodge, were constructed in the 1930s, and demolished in 1966.

=== Meadows in the Sky Parkway ===
The 26-kilometre summit road, now known as the Meadows in the Sky Parkway, was started in 1911, and was completed in 1927. During the First World War, Parks Commissioner J.B. Harkin authorized the use of interned "enemy aliens", mostly men from the Austro-Hungarian Empire, on construction projects in the national parks. An internment camp was constructed on the slopes of Mount Revelstoke in 1915. Over 200 interned men worked on the road to the summit, but began to refuse work once cold weather hampered them in the fall. The camp was abandoned and the men moved to other camps in the region.

=== Skiing ===
By the early 20th century, Revelstoke had become a popular skiing area, one of the first ski destinations in North America. Mount Revelstoke became the home of a ski-jumping facility in 1915; this was expanded to Olympic specifications in 1933. Other downhill runs were added, and Mount Revelstoke hosted many international competitions in the first half of the century. The jump was the longest natural jump in Canada, and international records were set there. Nels Nelsen was an early supporter of the skiing facilities and set several of the jumping records. The last event was held in 1971, and the ski area was converted to a trail system for hiking and downhill mountain biking.

== Climate ==
The park contains a portion of one of the world's few inland temperate rainforests. Steep, rugged mountains can be found in a warm, moist climate. A variety of plant and animal life is typical with stands of old-growth Western Redcedar and Western Hemlock, a forest type which is rapidly declining outside of protected areas. The park's inland rainforest also has an isolated population of banana slugs which marks the easternmost boundary of their distribution in British Columbia.

== Fauna ==
This national park protects a small herd of the threatened caribou as well as providing habitats for cougars, grizzly bears, lynxes, black bears, red foxes, moose, martens, coyotes, a variety of bats, timber wolves, several species of shrews, voles, mice, wolverines, and mountain goats.

== Flora ==
A variety of wildflowers grow in the park, some of which include Arctic lupine, glacier lily, pink mountain heather, willowherb, and spotted saxifrage. Wetland plant species that are found in the park include skunk cabbage, duckweed, and horsetail. Lichen, moss, and fungi also grow in the park's temperate rainforest habitat.

== Tourism ==
The Meadows-in-the-Sky Parkway is a paved mountain road open during the snow free months. The parkway begins in the rainforests of the park's southwest corner, winds upward through the sub-alpine forests and ends in the rolling sub-alpine wildflower meadows. The Monashee Mountains rise to the west, with the Selkirk range to the east.

Giant Cedars Boardwalk is a 500 m. (0.3 mi.) interpretive trail that twists through a stand of old-growth western red cedar and hemlock trees, some more than 800 years old. Exhibits along the way explore the secrets of this inland rainforest.

Skunk Cabbage Boardwalk is a 1.2 km. (0.75 mi.) interpretive trail that leads through valley bottom rainforest and fragile wetlands inhabited by muskrats, beavers, bears and the strange skunk cabbage plant. Exhibits also help to identify the many birds that migrate from South and Central America to the Skunk Cabbage area each year.

== Gallery ==
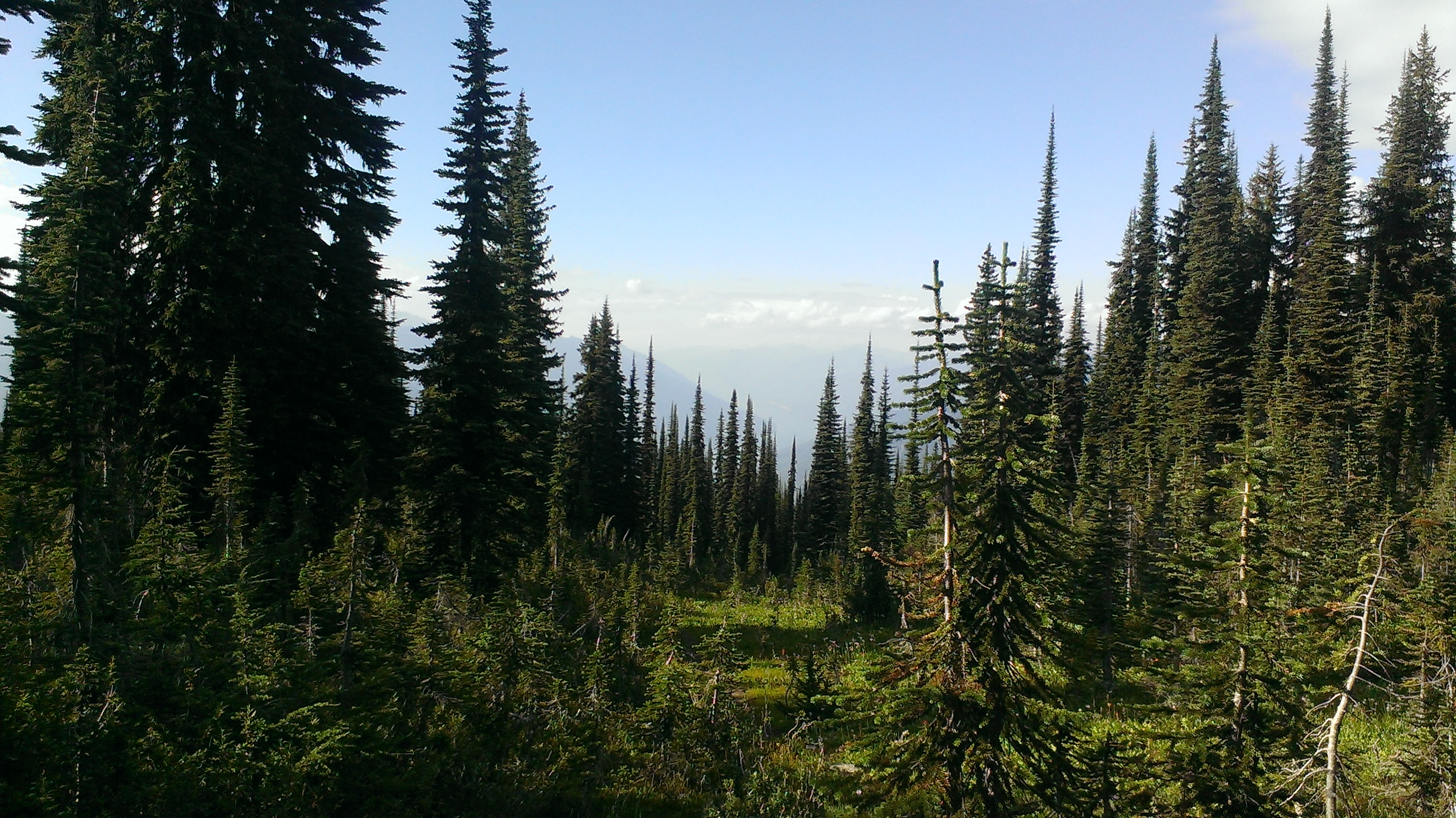
North of lake Balsam

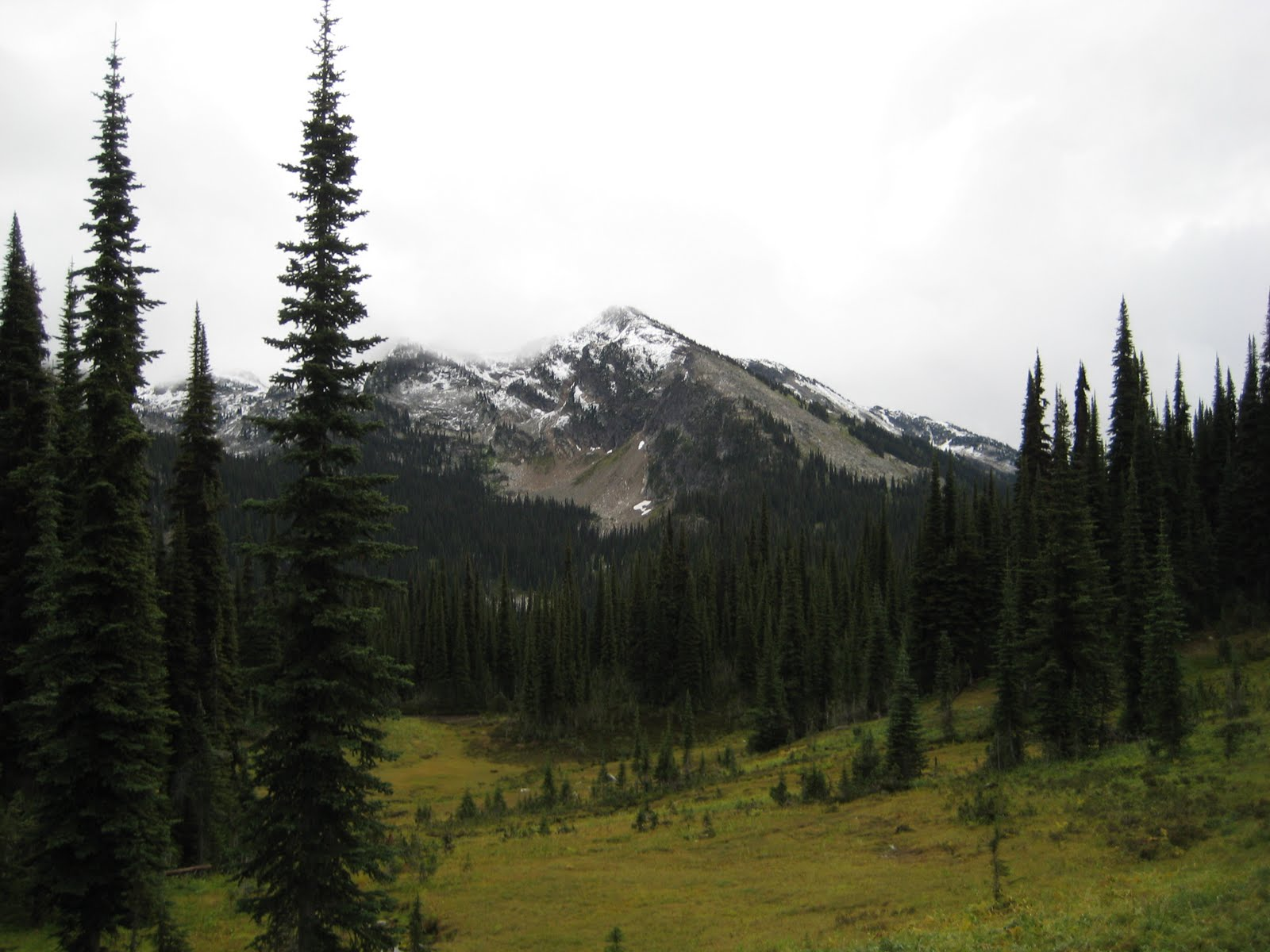
View from Eva Lakes Trail

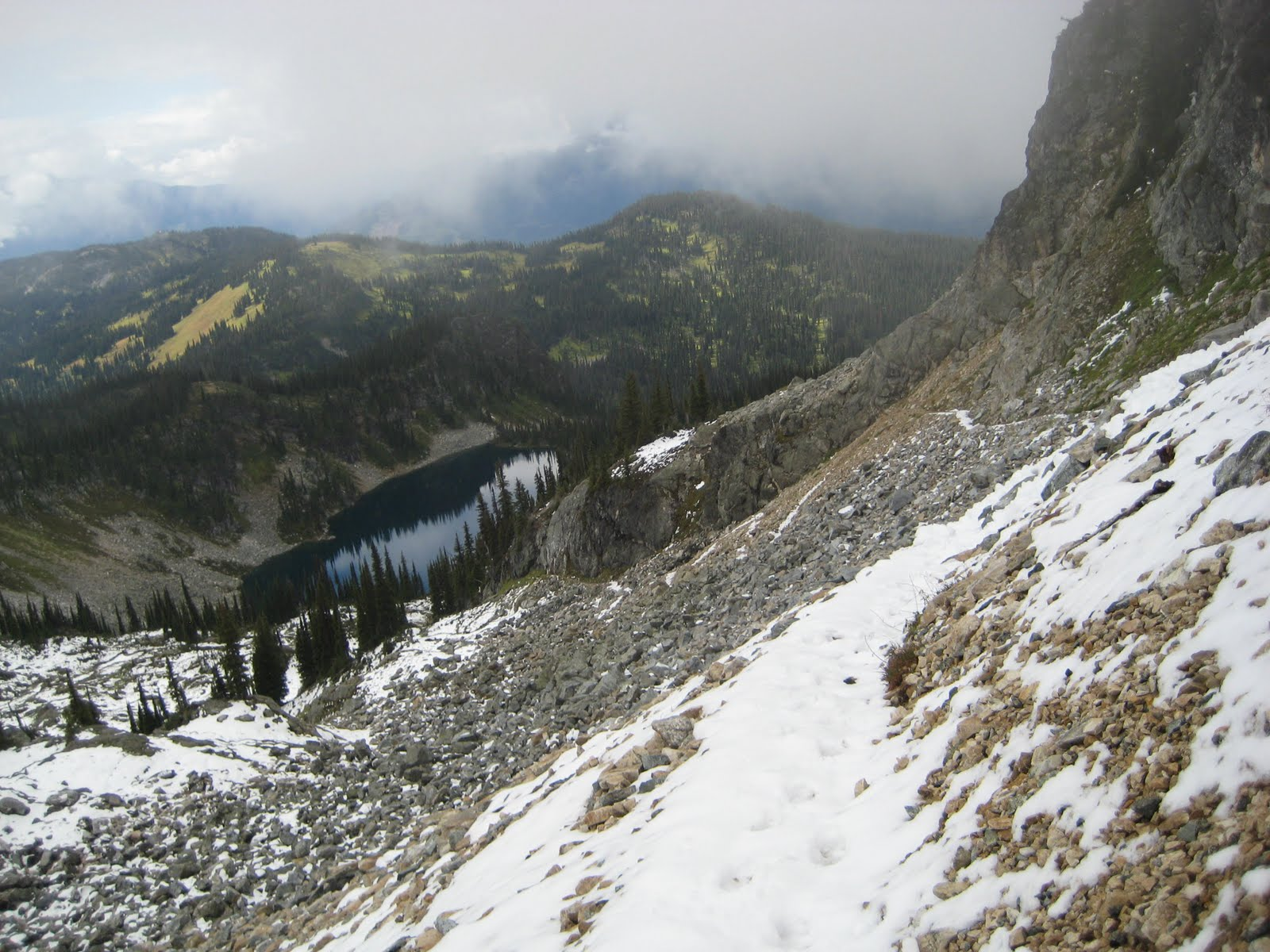
Miller Lake from Jade Lakes Trail

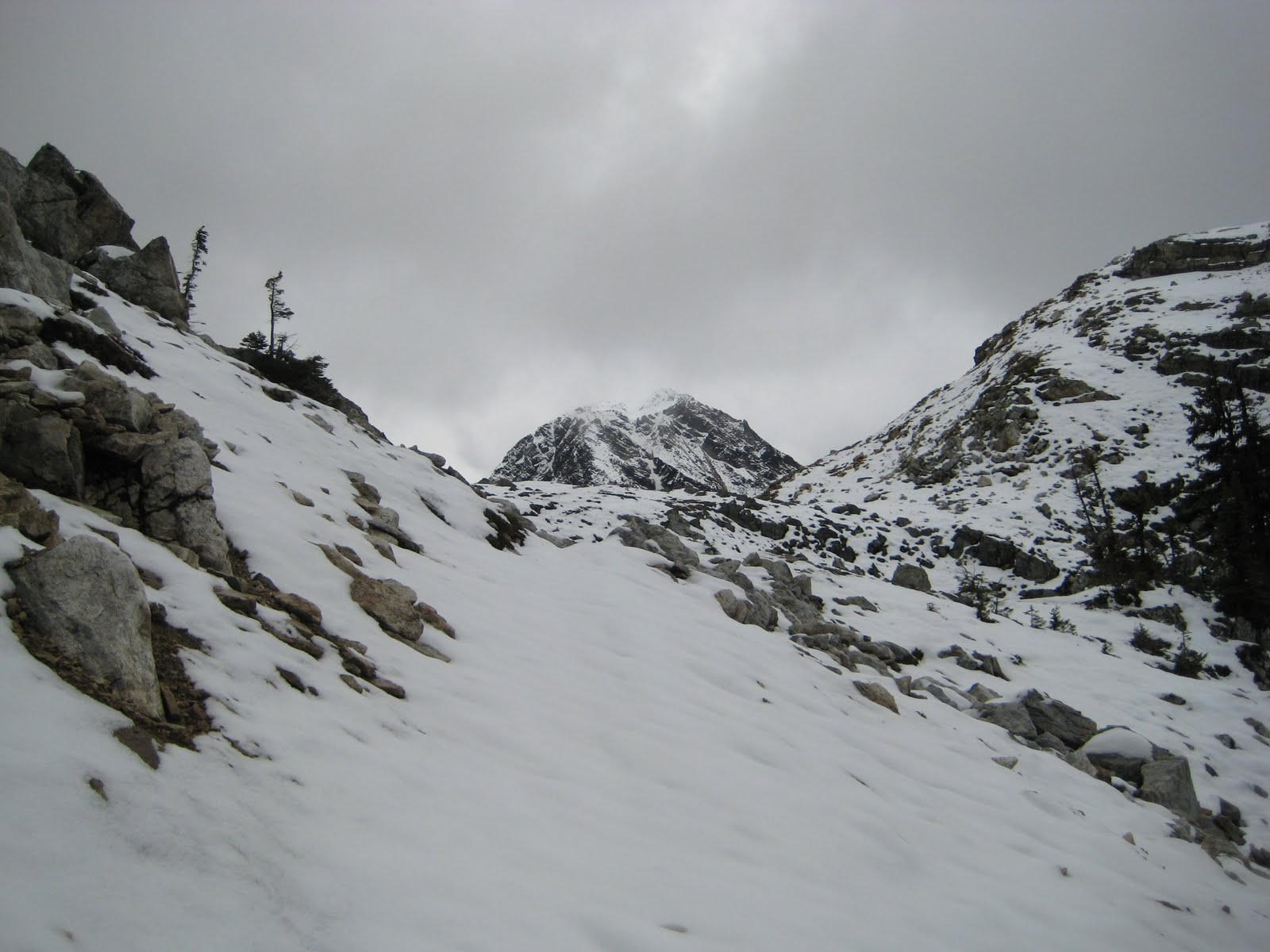
Jade Pass in early September

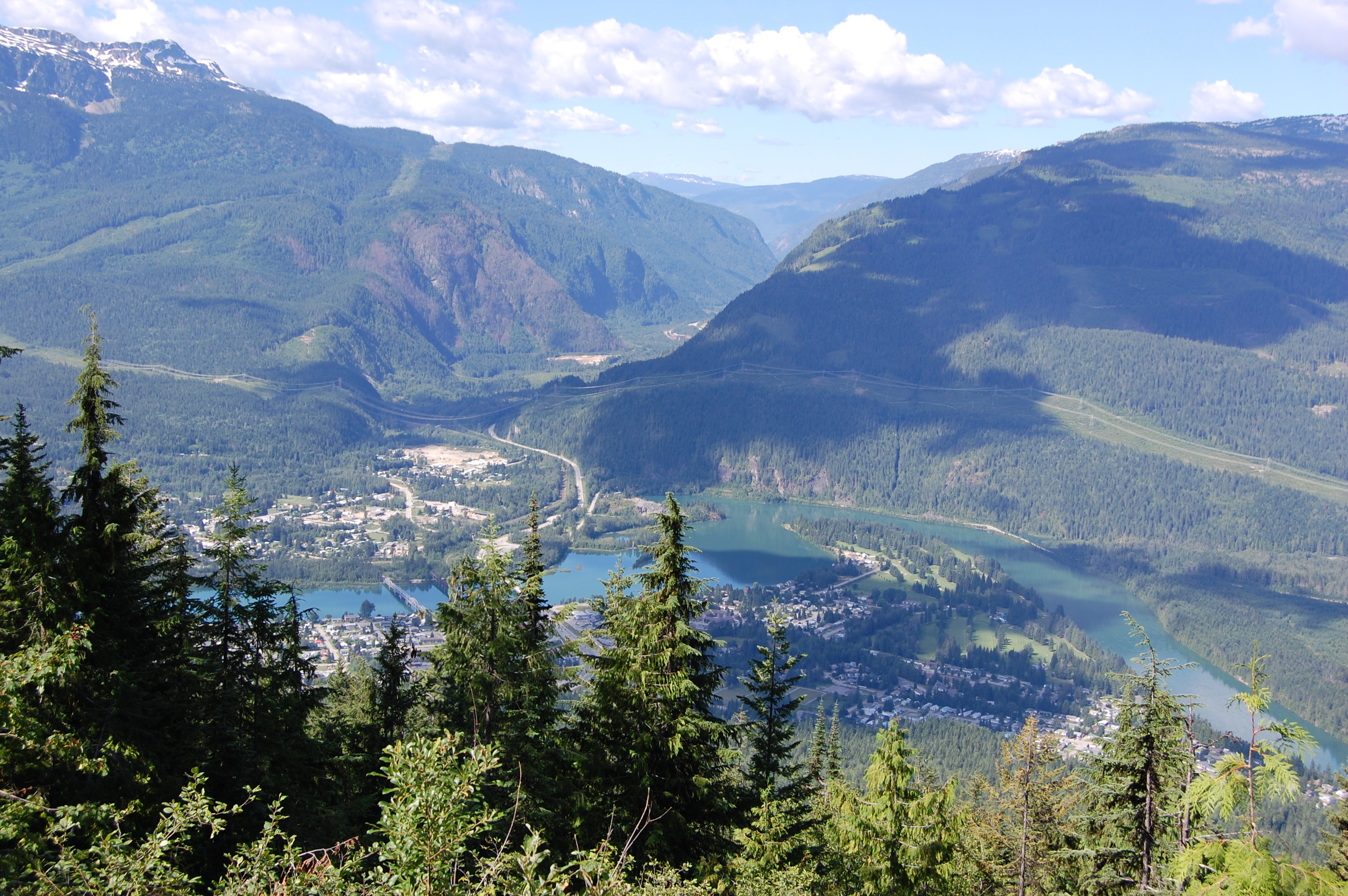
View of Revelstoke from the summit

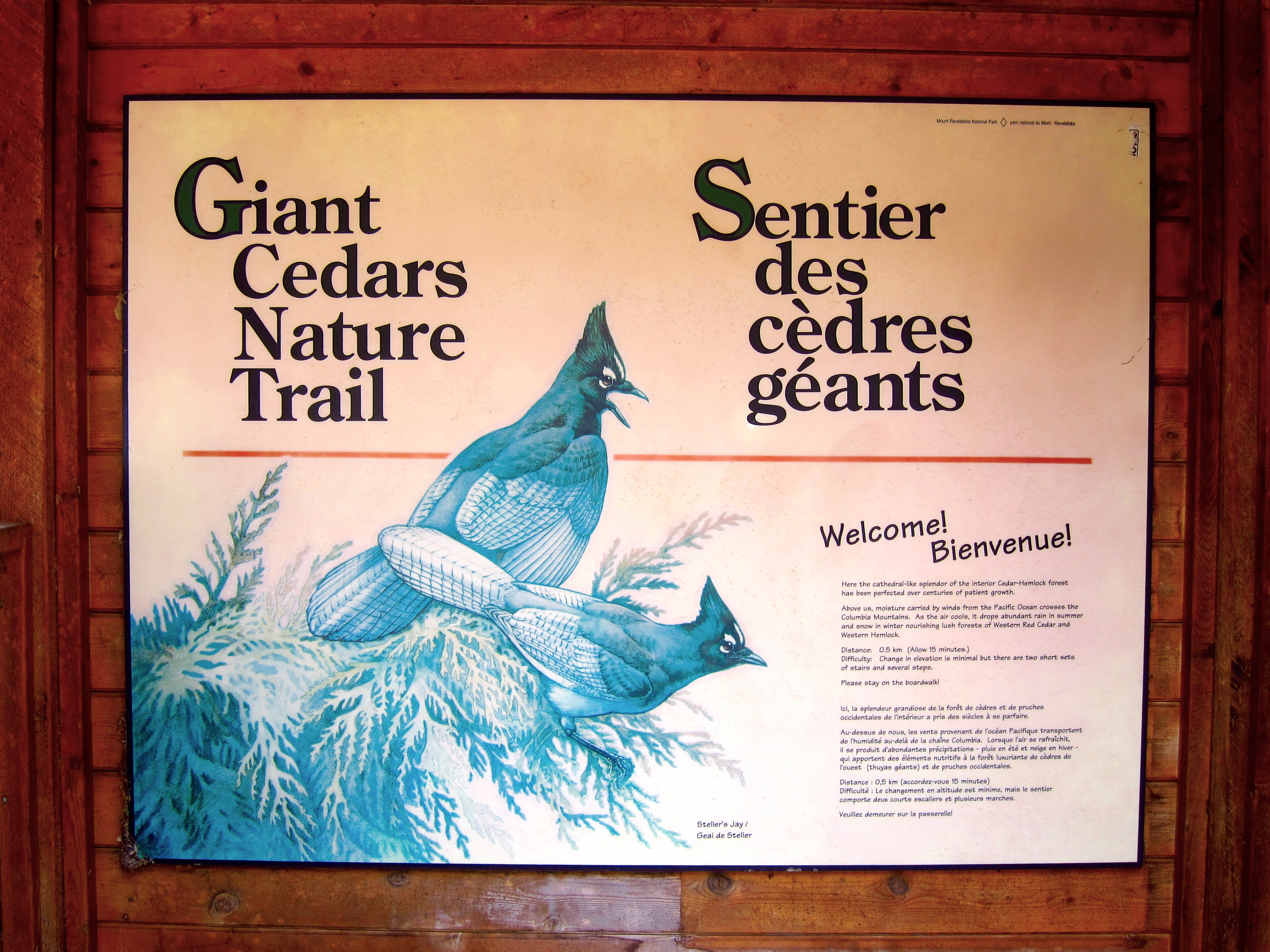
Giant Cedars Boardwalk Trail

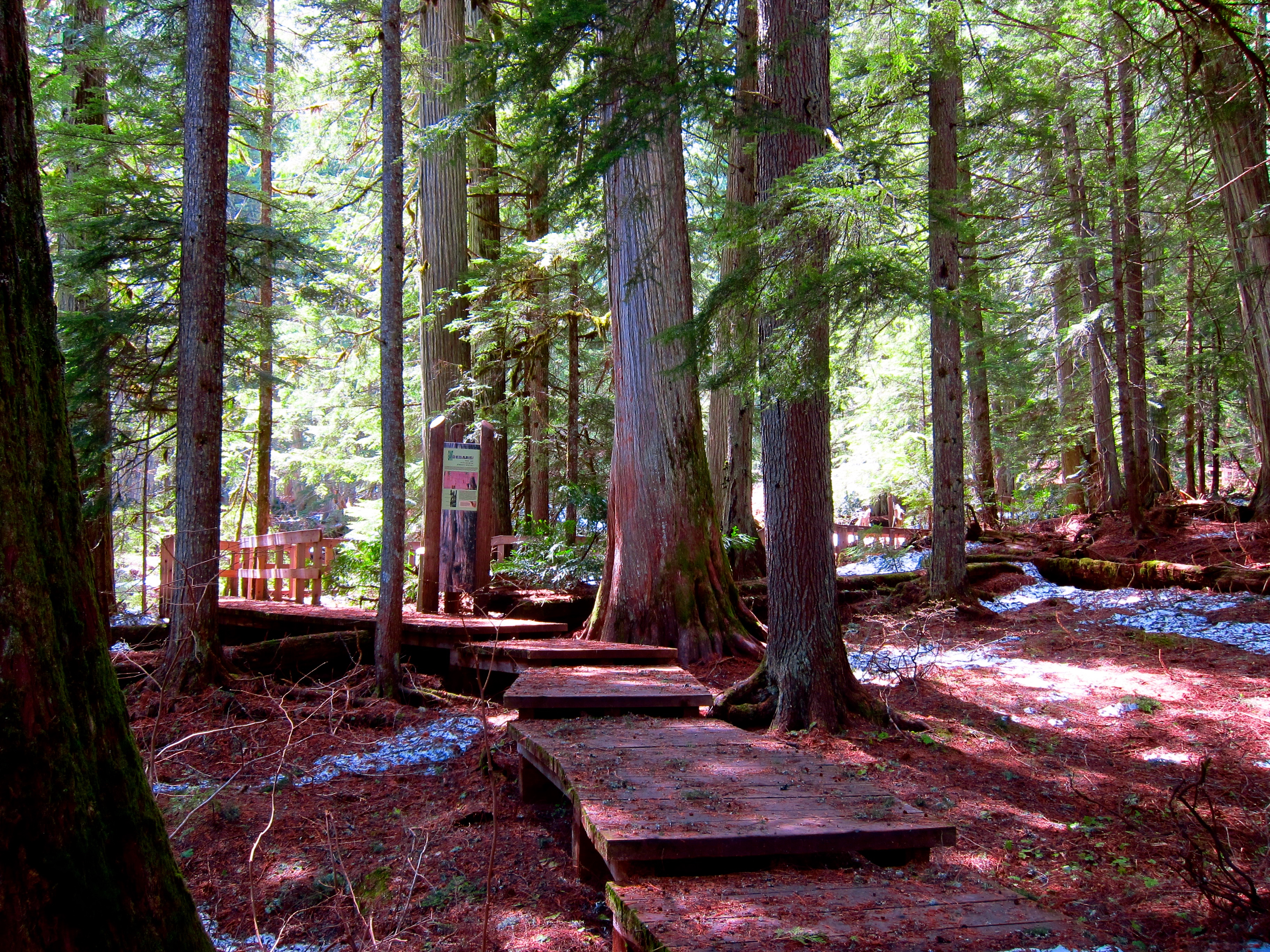
Giant Cedars Boardwalk Trail

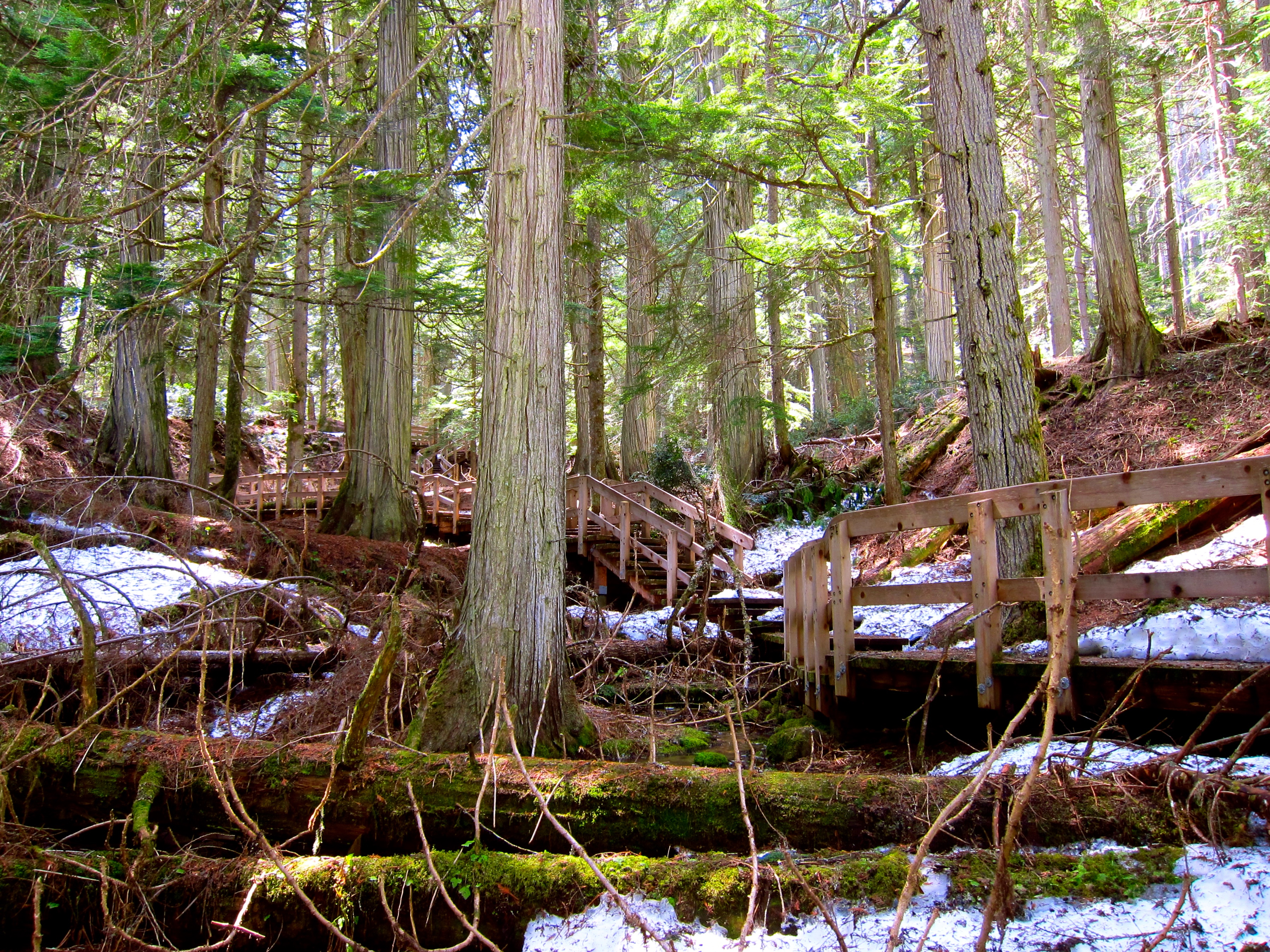
Giant Cedars Boardwalk Trail

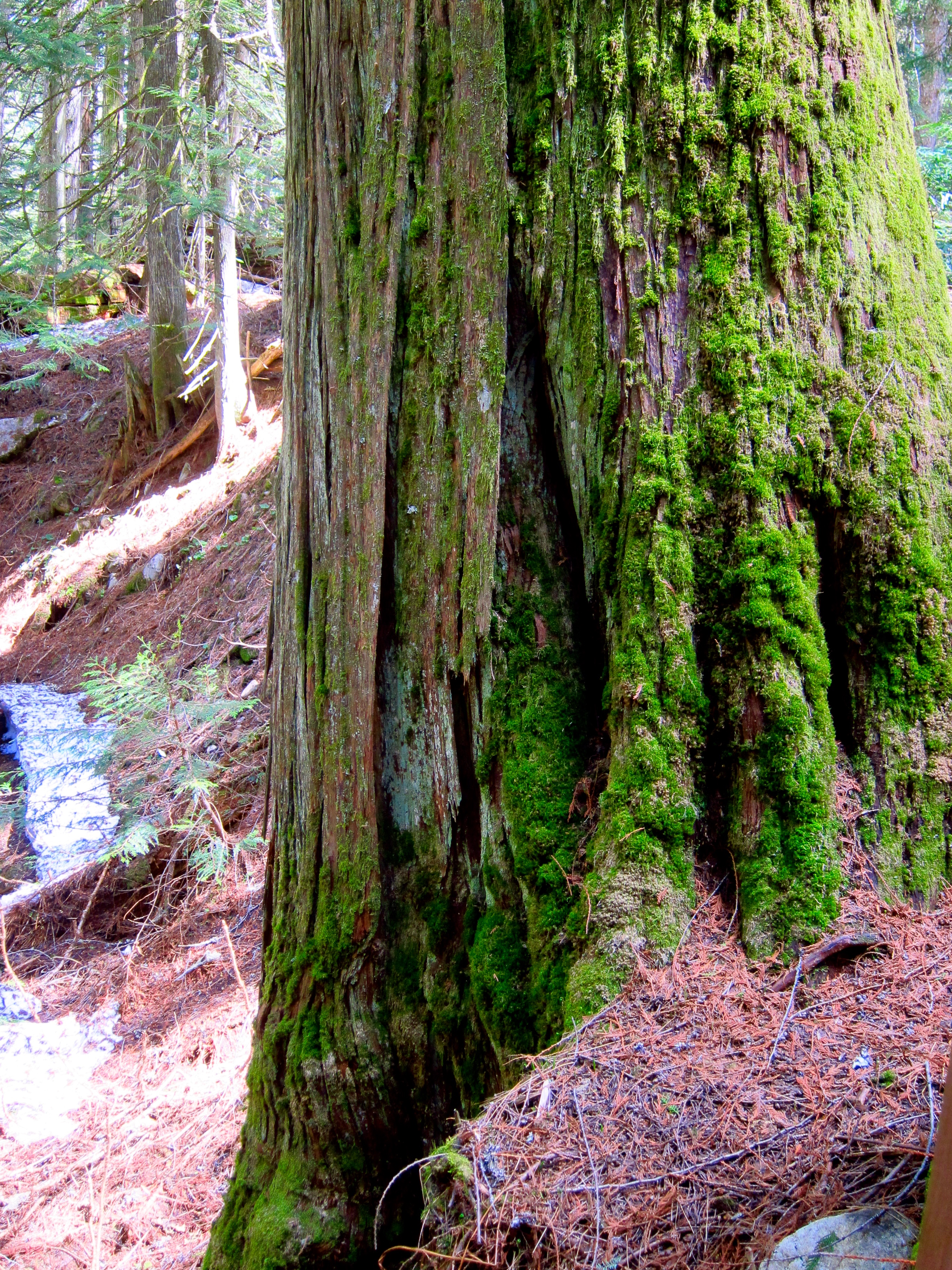
Giant Cedars Boardwalk Trail

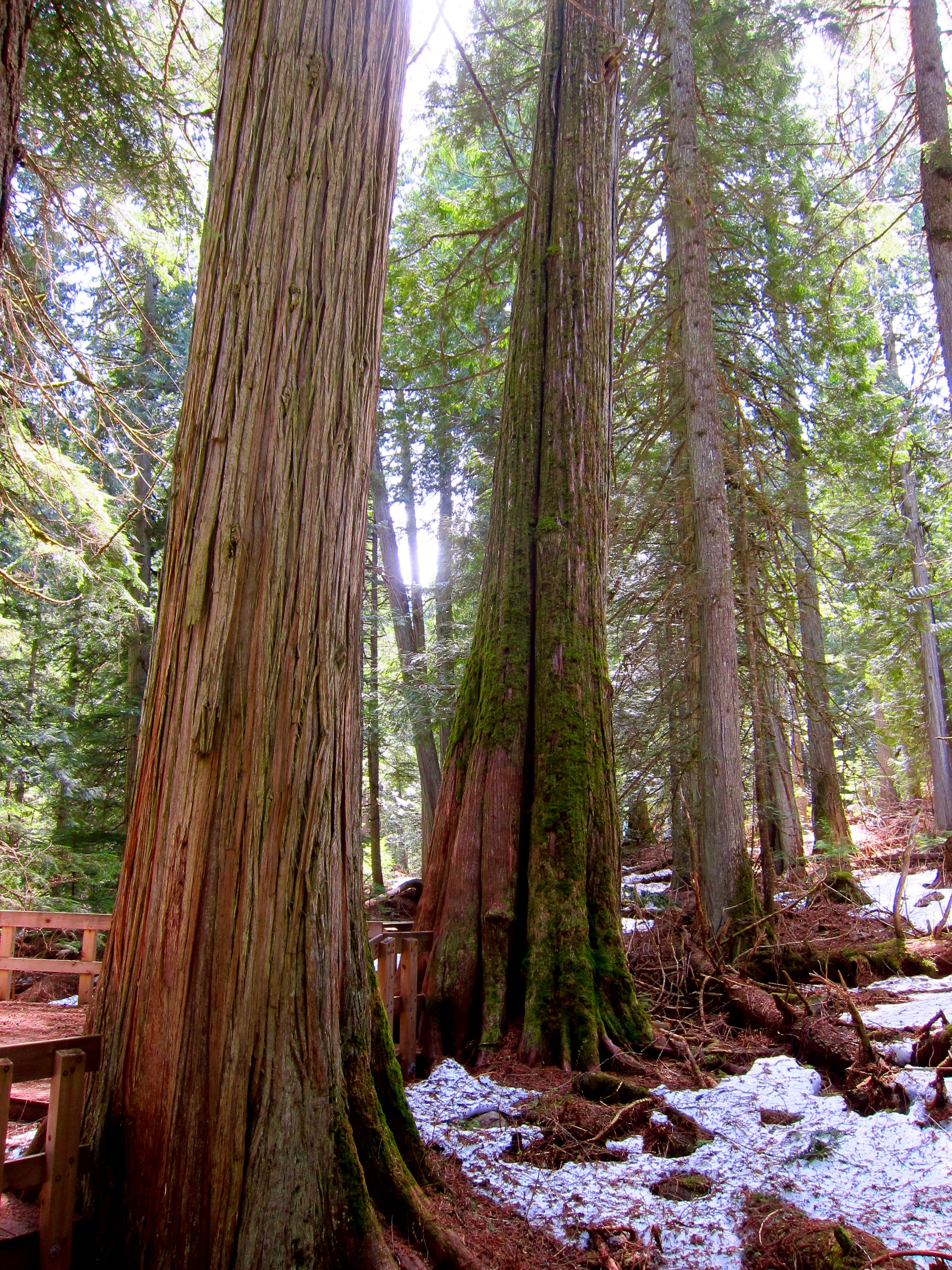
Giant Cedars Boardwalk Trail

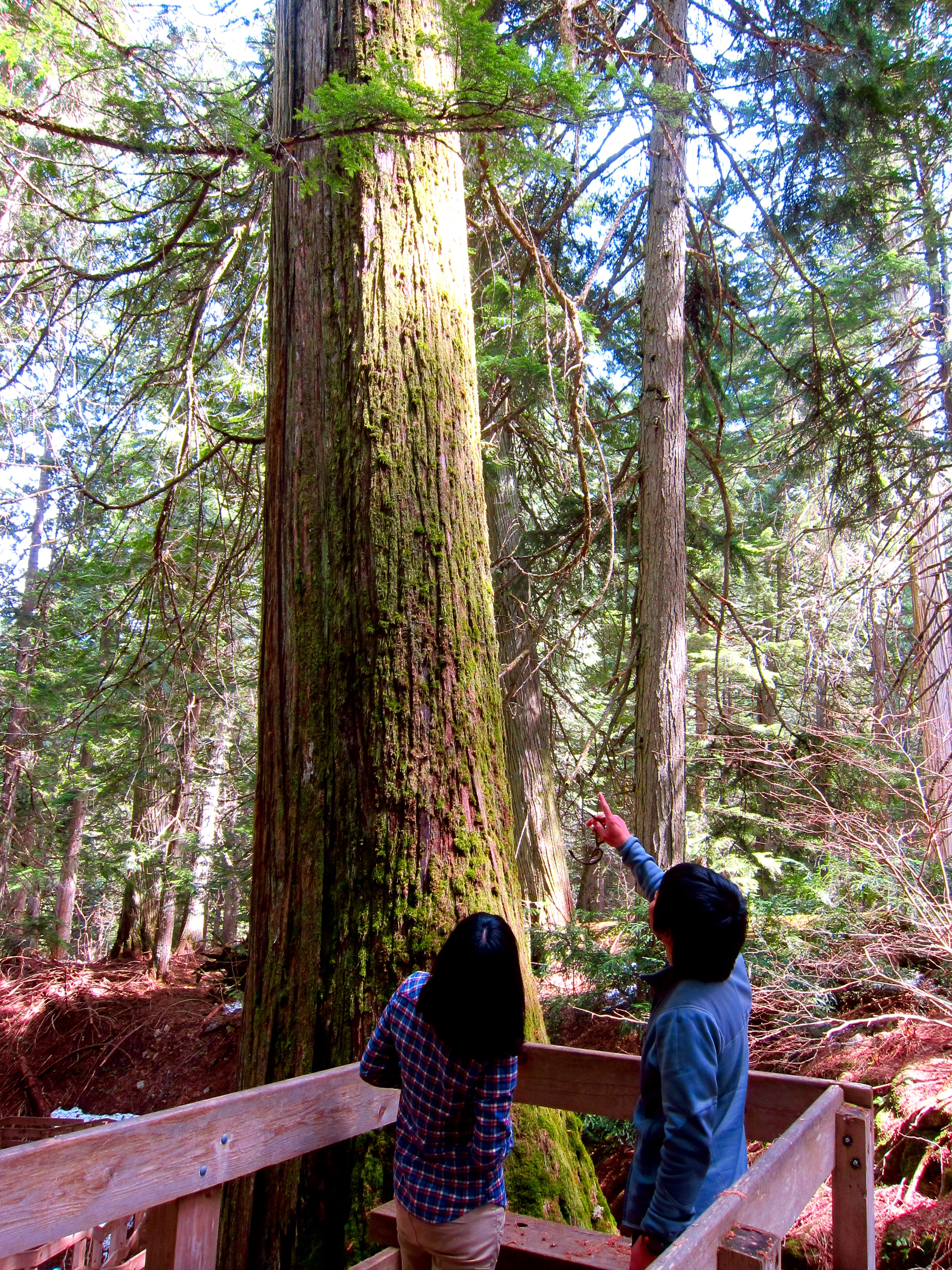
Giant Cedars Boardwalk Trail

== See also ==
- National Parks of Canada
- List of National Parks of Canada
- Revelstoke Mountain Resort
