= Survive the Raft =

American reality competition series

- Promotional poster
- Genre: Reality competition
- Inspired by: Acali Experiment by Santiago Genovés
- Presented by: Nate Boyer
- Country of origin: United States
- Original language: English
- No. of seasons: 1
- No. of episodes: 9

Production
- Executive producers: Tom Forman; Jenny Daly; Jon Beyer; Dean Ollins; David Dryden; Tom Shelly; Jimmy Quigley; Kyle Wheeler; Joseph Schneier
- Producer: Max Mooney
- Production location: Pearl Islands, Panama
- Camera setup: Multiple
- Running time: 42–83 minutes
- Production company: Critical Content

Original release
- Network: Discovery Channel
- Release: July 30 – September 24, 2023

Survive the Raft is an American reality competition series that premiered on the Discovery Channel on July 30, 2023. The series, hosted by Nate Boyer, is inspired by the 1973 Acali Experiment. Survive the Raft follows a diverse group of nine strangers from different races, religions, political affiliations, and belief systems who live and work aboard the Acali II raft for twenty-one days. The contestants must put aside their differences in order to complete challenges and earn money together as a team. The money won in each challenge goes into a team bank which is split equally among the contestants who make it to the end of the competition. Along the way, contestants are tempted with chances to steal money away from the team for themselves. The contestants are also given several opportunities throughout the competition to vote off one of their current team members in exchange for a new player.

== Overview ==
Survive the Raft is inspired by the 1973 Acali Experiment, which was conceived by Mexican anthropologist Santiago Genovés. He was fascinated by human behavior and the connection between sex and violence. Ultimately, he sought to study and cure human violence. Genovés placed ads in newspapers worldwide in order to put together a group of four men and six women that he deemed attractive from different races, religions, and backgrounds to take with him on a raft named Acali for a 101-day voyage across the Atlantic Ocean from the Canary Islands to Mexico. He manipulated situations in order to incite conflict between the participants, which backfired when he didn't get the results he wanted and the participants eventually turned on Genovés and even contemplated killing him. Genovés eventually admitted the error of his ways and the group was able to come together and make peace without violence.

In the series, contestants must similarly come together in order to achieve a common goal. The group lives and works together aboard the Acali II for twenty-one days. Every episode, the group competes in a bounty mission where the contestants must work together in order to win money for the team. The money earned over the course of the season is put into a team bank which is split equally among the contestants that make it to the end of the competition. Contestants are tempted during the bounty missions to steal money away from the team and keep it for themselves. The contestants are also given the option to vote off one of their current team members and replace them with a new contestant. The potential replacements compete with the existing team in a bounty mission before the group votes to decide if they want to swap out one of their current team members for the new player.

== Contestants ==
The original nine contestants competing in the series were revealed on July 24, 2023.

Contestant	Age	Residence	Entered	Exited	Status
Elliot Capella	30	Richmond, Virginia	Episode 1	Episode 9	Winner
Garrett Weir	40	Valley Stream, New York	Episode 6	Episode 9	Winner
Jimmy Yessin	28	Brookhaven, Pennsylvania	Episode 4	Episode 9	Winner
Maddie Witt	25	Chattanooga, Tennessee	Episode 1	Episode 9	Winner
Merissa Underwood	29	Missoula, Montana	Episode 1	Episode 9	Winner
Russell Ellis	39	Stafford, Virginia	Episode 1	Episode 9	Winner
Summer Sawaya	29	Fort Lauderdale, Florida	Episode 1 (Note: Summer Sawaya was introduced as a potential replacement at the end of episode one, after the group's first bounty mission.)	Episode 9	Winner
Tara Colucci	36	North Babylon, New York	Episode 1	Episode 9	Winner
Riley Ebenroth	26	Richmond, Virginia	Episode 7	Episode 7	Eliminated
CJ Duffie	30	Miami, Florida	Episode 1	Episode 6	Eliminated
Jason Carr	31	Tuscaloosa, Alabama	Episode 5	Episode 5	Eliminated
Lashanna Lintamo	36	Dunnigan, California	Episode 1	Episode 4	Eliminated
Mykhal Polite	26	Phoenix, Arizona	Episode 3	Episode 3	Eliminated
Summer Homayed	41	Dearborn Heights, Michigan	Episode 1	Episode 2	Quit
Jonathan Dade	39	Georgetown, Texas	Episode 1	Episode 1	Removed (Note: Jonathan Dade was removed from the competition for medical reasons after having a seizure.)

== Production ==
Filming of the first season took place over the course of twenty-one days in August 2022 on the Pearl Islands, off the coast of Panama. The series was officially announced by Warner Bros. Discovery in April 2023. As early as 2018, it was reported that reality show producers were looking to create a series based on the Acali Experiment. Host Nate Boyer said the Discovery Channel wanted to produce the show now in order to see if the social experiment would prove successful in today's polarized and divided climate. He also stated that the show's production team created a replica of the original Acali for the series, which had the same specifications as the original raft.

Contestant Elliot Capella said that his desire to positively represent the transgender community motivated him to join the cast of the show: "Once I was given that opportunity, I knew I had to take it because I knew that if I had seen someone like me on television as a kid, that would have meant the whole world to me". He noted his favorite part of the experience was the group overcoming challenges together as well as the general beauty of Panama. Summer Sawaya also reflected positively on her experience, stating that while it was difficult physically and emotionally, it was also one of the best experiences of her life and that she enjoyed seeing the group working together for the greater good.

== Episodes ==
No.	Title	Original release date	U.S. viewers (millions)
1	"This Isn't a Game"	July 30, 2023	0.87
Host Nate Boyer introduces the nine original contestants to the competition. Afterwards, Nate gives the team $1,500 to buy food and supplies for the entirety of their twenty-one day journey. The contestants arrive on the raft and get situated. Jonathan vents about Summer H., saying she was overly controlling with the team's money while they were shopping. The next day, Jonathan has a seizure aboard the raft and is transported to a local hospital. Summer H. expresses that she's struggling to fit in with the group as a Muslim woman. Lashanna defends Summer H. which leads to an argument between her and CJ when Lashanna talks about racial stereotypes and white privilege. Nate later informs the team that Jonathan has been permanently removed from the competition following his seizure. Before the bounty mission, the team agrees to stick together until the end no matter what.: Bounty mission: Contestants have 90 minutes to swim out to an island and obtain as many ammo cans, each filled with $2,000 for the team, as possible. Afterwards, the contestants must build hand-made rafts in order to transport themselves and their ammo cans back to Acali II. Contestants are tempted with an offer to take the money in the ammo cans they've obtained for themselves instead of putting it into the team's bank, but no contestant accepts. The team obtains ten ammo cans in total, amounting to $20,000 for the team's bank.; Elliot comes out to the group as transgender after CJ mentions that he has a transgender sister. CJ and Lashanna continue to bicker after she says she was offended when he told Nate he "gave" her an opportunity to lead during the bounty mission. Lashanna explains that she feels the comment was disrespectful and demeaning and the two remain unable to find common ground. The next morning, Nate informs the group that throughout the competition they will have opportunities to vote out one current team member in exchange for a new contestant. He then introduces Summer S. as the season's first possible replacement contestant.
2	"This Bitch Bites"	August 6, 2023	0.89
Summer S. attempts to integrate herself into the group so that she can stay in the competition. Lashanna angers the group when Summer H. tells everyone that Lashanna revealed the team's pact to stay loyal to each other and not allow any new contestants onto the team to Summer S. The remaining original contestants then confront Lashanna about the information she revealed to Summer S. Lashanna defends herself by saying Summer H. exaggerated her words and that she didn't reveal any specific alliance. Elliot, who was also present for the conversation, agrees with Lashanna. The group then begins to view Summer H. as a liar and pot stirrer.: Bounty mission: Contestants are split into three teams: Team Black (Summer S., Elliot, and Tara), Team Green (Summer H., Lashanna, and CJ), and Team Tan (Maddie, Merissa, and Russell). Each team has one hour to find and return a container that has been airdropped at a random location near the raft. Each container is filled with $15,000 for the team's bank. During the mission, Team Green is tempted with an offer to steal the group's total winnings in the mission and split it amongst themselves. They decline the offer. All three teams successfully complete the mission, earning $45,000 for the team's bank.; The group debates whether they should stick to their pact or vote out Summer H. or Lashanna. Summer H. tells the other contestants that Lashanna threatened her during the bounty mission and Merissa eventually tells Lashanna what Summer H. has been saying about her. This leads to a heated argument between Lashanna and Summer H. when Lashanna accuses Summer H. of spreading lies about her for the second time. Eventually, the group meets to decide whether they will eliminate one of their own so that Summer S. can officially join the team. Summer H. reiterates that she doesn't fit in with the group and feels isolated and targeted. She also says that she thinks they've already chosen Summer S. over her. Summer H. then quits and eliminates herself from the competition before the group can hold an actual vote, thereby making Summer S. an official new member of the team.
3	"Your Secret Is Safe with Me"	August 13, 2023	0.72
After Summer H. quits the competition, the remaining team members once again vow to remain loyal to each other until the end. CJ, Maddie, and Merissa, however, still privately express their interest in eliminating Lashanna. The group is then introduced to Mykhal, the next potential replacement contestant. Mykhal quickly makes a good impression on the team and they praise his intelligence, athleticism, and positive attitude.: Bounty mission: Contestants swim to a nearby island where they find plates of food containing crickets, mealworms, noni fruit, and aji peppers. One by one, each contestant must successfully eat everything on their plate in order to win $5,000 for the team's bank. Any leftovers that a contestant cannot finish are passed onto the remaining players' plates. The team is given 90 minutes to complete their mission. Maddie is tempted with an offer to steal the team's total earnings in the bounty mission for herself, which she refuses. Mykhal, Summer S., Elliot, and CJ are able to successfully eat everything on their plates, earning $20,000 for the team's bank.; As Mykhal continues to bond with the team, CJ mentions the possibility of voting out Lashanna to Russell. Russell rebuffs the idea, saying he isn't interested in backstabbing any of the team's original players. The next day, the group meets to discuss whether or not they will vote someone out in order to add Mykhal to their team. Nate informs the group that before they vote they must officially nominate one current team member to go up against Mykhal for potential elimination. Russell volunteers to nominate himself in order to save Lashanna from elimination. The group then votes anonymously in order to determine who will remain on the team. By a vote of eight to one, the group decides to keep Russell, eliminating Mykhal from the competition.
4	"Prepare to Send Nudes"	August 20, 2023	0.84
Following Mykhal's exit, Lashanna questions why Russell would nominate himself for elimination and wonders if the team was targeting her. Maddie mentions Lashanna's prior argument with Summer H., saying that Lashanna made comments during the argument that were out of line. Merissa expresses that she feels uncomfortable in Lashanna's presence after the argument because she believes Lashanna's words were threatening. Lashanna begins to feel defeated, saying that her words are constantly taken out of context and that she doesn't think she's able to be herself around the group. Afterwards, the team meets new player Jimmy.: Bounty mission: Five team members must run completely naked through the jungle and find as many pieces of fruit as they can. The naked runners are given ten bags in total that they must completely fill with the fruit they find. After collecting their bags of fruit, the runners must zipline across the ocean and successfully drop their bags into a large fishing net that's in the water. Each bag of fruit successfully dropped into the net within two hours earns $4,000 for the team's bank. Any bag that misses the net is discarded. The four remaining contestants that don't run have to construct the net that will be placed into the water. Maddie, Summer S., Merissa, CJ, and Elliot decide to run naked while Lashanna, Russell, Tara, and Jimmy construct the net. The naked runners are tempted with an offer to find a special apple in the jungle which, if taken, will allow them to steal $50,000 out of the team's bank for themselves. None of the runners decide to take the apple. The runners fill all ten bags with fruit and successfully drop them into the net, earning $40,000 for the team's bank. During the mission, Russell gets hit with one of the bags as it's falling into the water which injures his hand.; The group discusses who they should eliminate. CJ tells Jimmy he would eliminate Merissa or Tara, as he considers them to be the weakest players on the team. Tara contemplates eliminating Russell because of his hand injury. Later, Lashanna hears Merissa talking about her behind her back when Merissa says again that Lashanna is a threat to her physical safety. Lashanna approaches Merissa and tries to find resolution, saying she isn't a violent or dangerous person, but Merissa isn't receptive to Lashanna's attempt. At the elimination meeting, Nate informs the group that unlike the last elimination, there will be no official nominees and the group can vote in whichever way they chose to decide who will go home. The group decides to vote anonymously for who they want to eliminate, with all players being available options. Lashanna receives six votes and Jimmy receives three, eliminating Lashanna from the competition and making Jimmy an official new team member in her place.
5	"Step Back and Watch It Burn"	August 27, 2023	0.73
Jimmy expresses his gratitude to the group for making him an official member of their team but CJ remains unconvinced, stating that he finds Jimmy to be untrustworthy. CJ also acknowledges Merissa's role in Lashanna's elimination, pointing out that the team seems to cater to Merissa by doing whatever she wants. The next morning, the team meets new contestant Jason.: Bounty mission: First, the group must work together to untie a giant knot made of ropes. Afterwards, contestants are split into teams of three and have to drag six large crates, each weighing over 100 pounds, across the beach and past a finish line. Each crate that makes it past the finish line within 45 minutes earns the team $10,000. Jimmy begins to annoy the group by being bossy and controlling, despite the team previously agreeing that CJ and Merissa would lead the mission, while Russell struggles to compete due to his ongoing hand injury. In the end, the players successfully drag all six crates across the finish line, earning $60,000 for the team's bank.; After returning to the raft, each contestant is tempted with an offer to take $10,000 out of the team's bank for themselves. The group discusses strategically taking the offer so that a new contestant cannot come in and steal all of their earnings later. Every contestant, sans Jason, ultimately says yes to offer which deducts $80,000 from the team's bank. CJ begins to lead the charge to get Jimmy eliminated but Russell and Elliot express concerns about looking racist if they eliminate Jimmy, who is Syrian, after the consecutive exits of Summer H., Mykhal, and Lashanna. Later, CJ targets Tara, stating again to Jimmy that he considers her to be the weakest player on the team. Jimmy uses the opportunity to sow division and take the target off himself by telling Tara what CJ has been saying about her. Tara then angerly confronts CJ for calling her weak. CJ eventually apologizes but Tara remains upset and begins campaigning for CJ's elimination. However, Tara is unable to convince the rest of the team to vote CJ out. At the elimination meeting, Jason receives eight votes for elimination and CJ receives one, eliminating Jason from the competition.
6	"I Was Betrayed"	September 3, 2023	0.60
Tara continues to target CJ, telling Maddie and Merissa that CJ is a liar who is causing all of the issues on the raft and needs to go. CJ decides to change his strategy and stay quiet going forward, hoping to fly under the radar and stop Tara from campaigning for his elimination. CJ proposes a potential alliance to Jimmy, telling him that both of them will be able to stay in the competition as long as they keep Summer S., Elliot, and Russell on their side. The team then meets new contestant Garrett.: Bounty mission: Each contestant must hold on to a support rope in order to keep a large 2,000-pound wooden mast standing. If the team can keep the mast standing for 45 minutes, they will earn $35,000 for the team's bank. If the mast topples over, the team earns nothing. Nate tells the group that the first two contestants to let go of their rope will win $10,000 for themselves that is independent from the team's bank and won't be deducted from their total earnings. Towards the end of the mission, the team mutually decides that Tara and Russell can let go of their ropes and take the two $10,000 prizes. The team successfully keeps the mast standing for 45 minutes, earning $35,000 for the team's bank.; Following the bounty mission, the team praises Garrett for his strong performance and leadership. Elliot expresses his frustrations with CJ to Jimmy, saying that CJ has a negative attitude and wasn't giving his all in the mission. Jimmy comes up with a plan to keep both Garrett and CJ in the game by targeting Russell instead. Jimmy, Garrett, and CJ attempt to create an official alliance with Summer S. but she remains hesitant and declares that she doesn't want to backstab anyone for money. CJ confides in Garrett about his plan to try and stay in the game, saying he is going to ask Russell to eliminate himself because Russell's ongoing hand injury makes him unable to fully contribute to the team. Later, Garrett tells Russell about CJ's plan, which angers Russell and turns him against CJ. At the elimination meeting, CJ receives eight votes for elimination and Garrett receives one, eliminating CJ from the competition and making Garrett an official new team member in his place.
7	"He's Thinking with His D"	September 10, 2023	0.66
Garrett declares that he no longer trusts Summer S. after she openly admits that she voted to eliminate him instead of CJ. Summer S. later gets emotional and says she doesn't trust Garrett or Jimmy because they threw CJ under the bus, which led to his elimination. The next morning, the team meets Riley, the next possible replacement contestant.: Bounty mission: In pairs, contestants paddleboard from the raft out to a buoy in the ocean. After reaching the buoy, one contestant in each pair must swim underwater to obtain a case of money that is attached to the buoy's line. Contestants are given 20 minutes to obtain as many cases of money as they can. The pairs compete one by one, with one contestant in each pair being designated to paddling and the other to swimming. When it's Jimmy's turn to compete with Merissa, Jimmy struggles to balance on the paddleboard and falls off several times. Jimmy is then unable to swim deep enough to obtain a case of money after he and Merissa reach the buoy, wasting the team's valuable time. Contestants are tempted with an offer to untie a dive weight that's also attached to the buoy's line in order to steal $20,000 from the team's bank for themselves, but no contestant unties the weight. The team obtains four out of ten cases of money, earning $17,500 for the team's bank.; Jimmy expresses his interest in keeping Riley in the game, telling her that if the two of them plus Garrett and Summer S. vote together as the four replacement contestants then they will only need one more vote in order to control who goes home. Riley decides to bond with the other women and strategically flirt with Russell in order to try and stay in the competition. Summer S. stays steadfast in not wanting to commit to any alliances and Jimmy and Riley express their frustrations about her being a follower that refuses to make a big move in the game. At the elimination meeting, Riley receives seven votes for elimination and Garrett receives two, eliminating Riley from the competition. After Riley's elimination, Nate informs the group that the eight remaining players are the final team moving forward into the next phase of the competition and that no more new contestants will be introduced. He adds, however, that the eight remaining players aren't safe and that the eliminations will continue.
8	"This Is Gonna Get Real Messy"	September 17, 2023	0.72
The group discusses who they should eliminate going forward in the competition after Nate's announcement telling them that the eliminations will continue. The contestants rally against Russel after he advises the team to stick together and not vote anyone else off the raft, saying greed would be the only reason to continue voting players off. Certain members of the team begin to see Russell as controlling and declare that he no right to tell the others what to do and shouldn't have agreed to partake in the competition at all if he wasn't interested in winning money. They also label him a hypocrite, recounting how he told the team that it would be unfair to vote Lashanna off the team because she is a Black woman but then voted to eliminate Garrett, who is also Black. Maddie, Tara, Summer S., and Garrett make a plan to eliminate Russell and Garrett tells Jimmy about the plan the next morning.: Bounty mission: Contestants are split into four pairs. One contestant in each pair will be harnessed to a truss that's suspended over the water and must hold their partner in their arms without dropping them for 15 minutes. The team will earn $5,000 for each pair that is able to stay in each other's arms for 15 minutes without falling into the water. All four pairs successfully complete the mission, earning $20,000 for the team's bank.; Tara changes her target from Russell to Jimmy after she says Jimmy endlessly complained and almost dropped her during the bounty mission. Garrett tells Jimmy that Tara is targeting him, causing a fracture in the group which ruins the plan to vote out Russell. Jimmy then tells Russell that the women on the raft were leading the charge to get him eliminated as retaliation for Tara wanting to eliminate him. The team gets together to try and work through their differences as Tara confronts Jimmy about his negativity and Maddie calls out Russell for his hypocrisy. Garrett makes the team question his loyalty when he says he's tired of the group's kumbaya attitude, making the others feel like he's only in the game to win as much money for himself as possible. At the elimination meeting, Nate informs the group that they will continue voting anonymously for who they'd like to eliminate. The contestants can also abstain from voting and choose to not eliminate anybody. Due to the fact that none of the contestants feel secure in having enough votes to successfully eliminate a player from the team, all eight contestants choose to abstain from voting and nobody is eliminated from the competition.
9	"Two-Faced Bitch"	September 24, 2023	0.70
The group has one final dinner together the night before their final bounty mission and reminiscence about their time aboard the Acali II. Meanwhile, Jimmy and Garrett strategize privately. Jimmy vents to Garrett about the rest of the team and their lack of loyalty to him, namely Summer S., who he calls the most two-faced person he has ever met. Jimmy expresses his interest in eliminating Summer S., Merissa, Tara, or Maddie in the final bounty mission if given the opportunity.: Bounty mission: Nate explains that the team's final bounty mission will be split into several parts. In part one, the team is given one hour to pack all of their belongings, vacate the Acali II, and travel back to land with their luggage using paddleboards, one small boat, and a life raft. If the team successfully makes it back to land within an hour, they win $25,000 for the team's bank. Jimmy and Garrett struggle on their paddleboard and lag behind the rest of the team during the mission as the rest of the contestants contemplate eliminating them. Ultimately, the entire team still makes it back to land within the hour, earning $25,000 for the team's bank. In part two of the mission, the team is given another hour to transport the 350-pound safe containing their prize money through the jungle to a church located in a nearby village. If the team successfully completes part two, they will earn another $25,000. If the team takes longer than an hour to complete the mission, money will be deducted from the $25,000 offer. In the middle of the mission, Nate stops the team to informs them about a surprise twist. The team is told that they must rank all of their fellow players from most to least valuable. The two team members voted most valuable will be safe from elimination, guaranteeing that they will take home their share of the team's prize money. The team member voted least valuable will be nominated for elimination. Elliot and Maddie are voted most valuable while Jimmy is voted least valuable. Afterwards, the team votes to decide whether or not Jimmy will be eliminated. Merissa votes to eliminate Jimmy while the six other team members vote to keep him, allowing him to remain in the competition. The team resumes the bounty mission and completes it in just under 70 minutes, earning $20,000 for the team's bank.; Nate informs the team that they will have one final opportunity to eliminate players and win a larger share of the team's total earnings for themselves. Each contestant is given a ballot containing the names of their fellow team members and told to cross out the names of any players that aren't worthy of winning their share of the team's prize money. Any player whose name gets crossed out by one of their teammates will be eliminated from the competition. Elliot and Maddie remain safe from elimination due to being voted the team's most valuable players earlier in the day. The ballots reveal that none of the players decided to cross out a fellow team member's name. Therefore, nobody is eliminated from the competition. Elliot, Garrett, Jimmy, Maddie, Merissa, Russell, Summer S., and Tara are then declared the winners of the competition and split the $223,000 in the team's bank equally amongst themselves.
