= Ra (1972 film) =

1972 documentary film

- Film poster
- Directed by: Lennart Ehrenborg; Thor Heyerdahl
- Produced by: Lennart Ehrenborg
- Cinematography: Carlo Mauri; Kei Ohara
- Production company: Sveriges Radio
- Release date: 23 March 1972
- Running time: 106 minutes
- Countries: Sweden; Norway
- Language: English

Ra (also known as The Ra Expeditions) is a 1972 documentary film directed by Lennart Ehrenborg and Thor Heyerdahl about the expeditions organised by Thor Heyerdahl in 1969 and 1970 in attempt to cross the Atlantic on papyrus boats. It was nominated for an Academy Award for Best Documentary Feature.

== Cast ==
- Norman Baker
- Roscoe Lee Browne as Narrator
- Abdullah Djibrine
- Santiago Genovés
- Thor Heyerdahl as Himself
- Carlo Mauri
- Kei Ohara
- Madanni Ait Ouhanni
- Yuri Senkevich
- Georges Sourial
