= Valley Christian Schools =

Valley Christian Schools may refer to:

- Valley Christian Schools (Arizona) - Phoenix Area
- Valley Christian Schools (Cerritos, California) - Los Angeles Area
- Valley Christian Schools (Dublin, California) - San Francisco Bay Area
- Valley Christian Schools (San Jose, California) - San Francisco Bay Area
