= Rashad Salim =

Rashad Salim (Arabic: رشاد سليم) is an Iraqi artist and activist based in London.

== Early life ==
Born in 1957 in Khartoum, Sudan to a German mother and Iraqi father, Salim had travelled widely before settling in Iraq in 1971. He has a sister, Rayya, who's also an artist. He studied graphic arts at the Institute of Fine Arts at Baghdad in 1980 shortly before moving to London to begin his studies in audio visuals at St Martin’s School of Art in 1983. During the years 1977 and 1978, Salim was a member on the Norwegian Thor Heyerdahl’s reed-boat expedition from the river Tigris to Djibouti.

His work is heavily influenced by his travels and residencies, these include the cultural sphere of Tunisia, Morocco, Yemen and the United Kingdom. Salim's career involves teaching and he also acts as an art advisor for the United Nations.

Rashad Salim comes from a highly artistic family. His father was a well-known artist in his own right in Baghdad, and his uncle, the late Jawad Salim, was a pioneer of modern art in Iraq and one of the most famous artists in the country at his time. Salim is a junior member of the Selim Dynasty of artists. He is also a member of the Strokes of Genius project.

Salim presently lives and works in England.
