= Colla Micheri =

- Frazione
- Location of Colla Micheri in Italy
- Coordinates: 43.9693°N 8.1576°E
- Country: Italy
- Region: Liguria
- Province: Savona
- Comune: Andora
- Time zone: UTC+1 (CET)
  - Summer (DST): UTC+2 (CEST)

Colla Micheri is a medieval village in Liguria region of north-west Italy.

It is a frazione of the comune of Andora, in the province of Savona.

== Geography ==
The village lies directly above the seaside town of Laigueglia.

The nucleus of the village has a medieval bakery, a restored church and a bar/restaurant.

== History ==
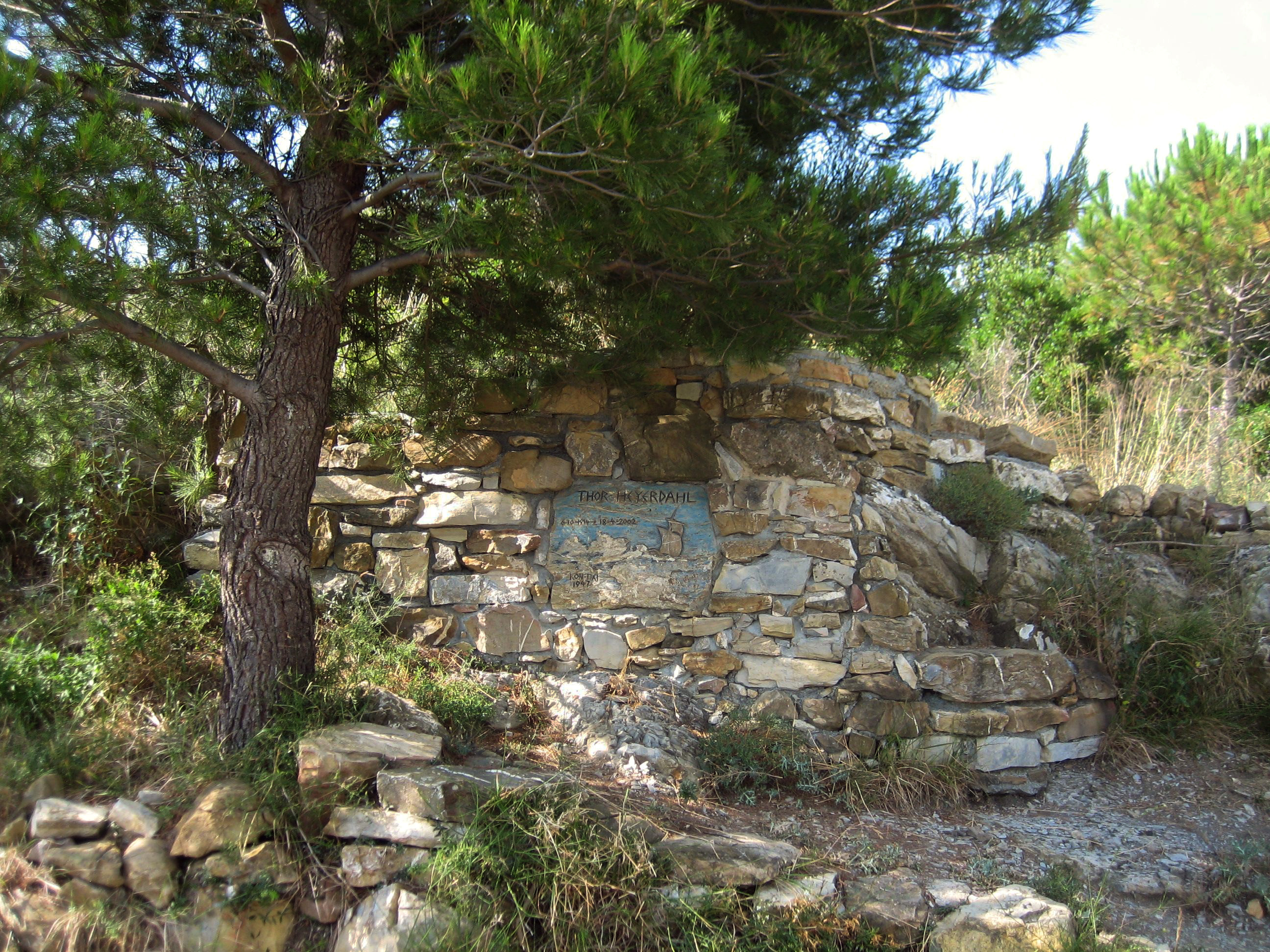
Thor Heyerdahl's tomb at Colla Micheri

The Via Julia Augusta, a Roman road built in 13 A.D., passes through the village.

Nowadays it is famous as Thor Heyerdahl, the famous Norwegian anthropologist, restored many of the buildings which had been neglected in the twentieth century. He lived there with his family when not travelling. In 2002, he died there and his cremated remains lie in the garden of his family's home.

== Notes and references ==
- Roberts, Cecil (1955). Portals to Paradise - An Italian Excursion. The Macmillan Company. p. 192.
