= Edwin Ferdon =

American ethnologist (1913–2002)

Edwin Nelson Ferdon Jr.
- Born: June 14, 1913; St. Paul, Minnesota
- Died: November 13, 2002 (aged 89); Tucson, Arizona
- Spouse: Vearl Ferdon
- Children: 3

Edwin Ferdon (June 14, 1913 – November 13, 2002) was an American ethnologist noted for his studies of the people of the Americas and Polynesia. Ferdon attained his bachelor's degree from the University of Minnesota and his master's degree from the University of California. During his lifetime, Ferdon participated in field work in Peru, Bolivia, Mexico, Ecuador, and Easter Island. While he was not in the field, he worked in museums, including the Museum of New Mexico as a curator and the Museum of International Folk Art as the director. Ferdon died on November 13, 2002, at the age of 89.

== Early life ==
Edwin Nelson Ferdon Jr. was born on June 14, 1913, in St. Paul, Minnesota. He had two sisters and a brother. Ferdon's family moved to Coshocton, Ohio, where he attended high school. While in Ohio, he also participated in Boy Scouts of America and became an Eagle Scout.

He attended the University of Minnesota and graduated in 1937. While in school, he went to do field work in Peru and Bolivia in 1935, and later went to Mexico in 1936 and again in 1937. Ferdon's brother, John, was killed at the age of 17 due to a radio that fell into the bath water in 1936 while Ferdon was away in Mexico City.

== Career ==
After graduation, he worked for the Museum of New Mexico in Santa Fe, New Mexico as a curator until 1938. He left that job in order to do fieldwork in Ecuador for three years where he conducted archaeological surveys. He went on to attend the University of California to obtain a master's degree.

In 1955, Thor Heyerdahl asked Ferdon to go on an expedition to Easter Island as an archaeologist. Ferdon was one of four archaeologists who went on the expedition. While in Eastern Polynesia, Ferdon studied the walking rituals and the details of modern life in Tahiti. Ferdon also took many photographs to document the expedition. He published many books and articles on his studies. Ferdon worked for the Arizona State Museum at the University of Arizona and retired in 1983, after serving as associate director. During his career as an anthropologist and archaeologist, he was also the director of the Museum of International Folk Art in Santa Fe.

Ferdon died on November 13, 2002, due to cancer. He is buried at the East Lawn Cemetery in Tucson, Arizona.

== Publications ==
- Early Tonga: As the Explorers Saw It 1616–1810. University of Arizona Press. January 1988. ISBN 9780816510269.
- Early Tahiti As the Explorers Saw It, 1767–1797. University of Arizona Press. 1981. ISBN 9780816507085.
- Early Observations of Marquesan Culture, 1595–1813. The University of Arizona Press. 1993. ISBN 9780816513918.
- Characteristic Figurines from Esmeraldas. School of American Research. 1945.
- Ferdon, Edwin (1966). One Man's Log.
- Studies in Ecuadorian Geography. School of American Research and University of Southern California. 1950. ISBN 9780826303837.
- Tonalá, Mexico: An Archaeological Survey. School of American Research. 1953.
- A Trial Survey of Mexican-Southwestern Architectural Parallels, Issue 21. School of American Research. 1955.
