= Nate Boyer =

American football player (born 1981)

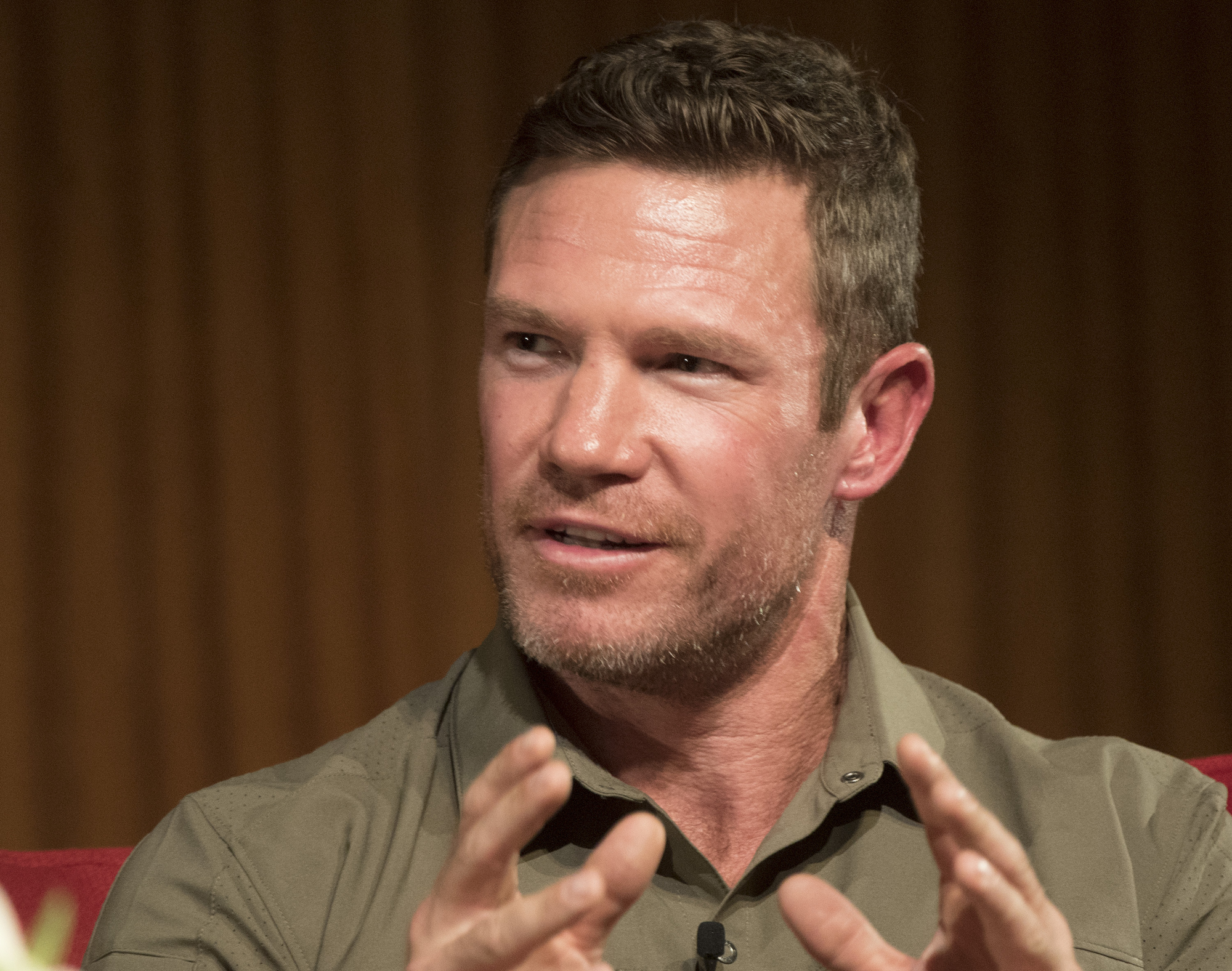
- Boyer in 2018

No. 37, 48
- Position: Long snapper

Personal information
- Born: January 9, 1981 (age 45); Oak Ridge, Tennessee, U.S.
- Listed height: 5 ft 10 in (1.78 m)
- Listed weight: 216 lb (98 kg)

Career information
- High school: Valley Christian (CA)
- College: Texas
- NFL draft: 2015: undrafted

Career history
- Seattle Seahawks (2015)*
- * Offseason or practice squad member only

Awards and highlights
- Armed Forces Merit Award (2012)

Nate Boyer (born January 9, 1981) is a United States Army Green Beret, actor, and former professional football player who played one season in the National Football League (NFL) as a long snapper. He played college football for the Texas Longhorns and was signed by the Seattle Seahawks as an undrafted free agent in 2015.

== Early life ==
Boyer grew up in Pleasanton, California, and attended Amador Valley High School before transferring to Valley Christian School. His father is a veterinarian and his mother is an environmental engineer. After graduating high school, Boyer briefly worked as a deck hand on a sport fishing boat in San Diego. He also trained to become a firefighter before quitting. After high school graduation in 1999, Boyer moved to Hollywood to pursue an acting career. In 2004, he became a relief worker in Sudan, building camps for refugees of the War in Darfur. After a short stint there, he enlisted in the United States Army, training at Fort Benning, and later was accepted into the Green Berets. After multiple tours in both Iraq and Afghanistan, Boyer earned an honorable discharge as a staff sergeant after six years of service.

== College career ==
Despite never playing a down of organized football in his life, Boyer played for the University of Texas as a walk-on. He was a redshirt for his freshman year in 2010, while playing once in 2011 against Texas Tech as a member of the kickoff team. The following year, he became the team's starting long snapper, and played 38 consecutive games for the Longhorns. From 2012–2014, he was a first-team Academic All-Big 12 Conference member, while also being named an Academic All-American in 2012. He was also named the 2012–13 Big 12 Sportsperson of the Year, the third Longhorn to be honored, and was the inaugural winner of the Armed Forces Merit Award. From 2013–14, he was a semifinalist for the William V. Campbell Trophy. In 2015, he was named to the NFF Hampshire Honor Society, which recognizes athletes with a cumulative grade point average of at least 3.2 during their college careers.

Boyer graduated in May 2013 with a physical culture and sports degree.

== Professional career ==
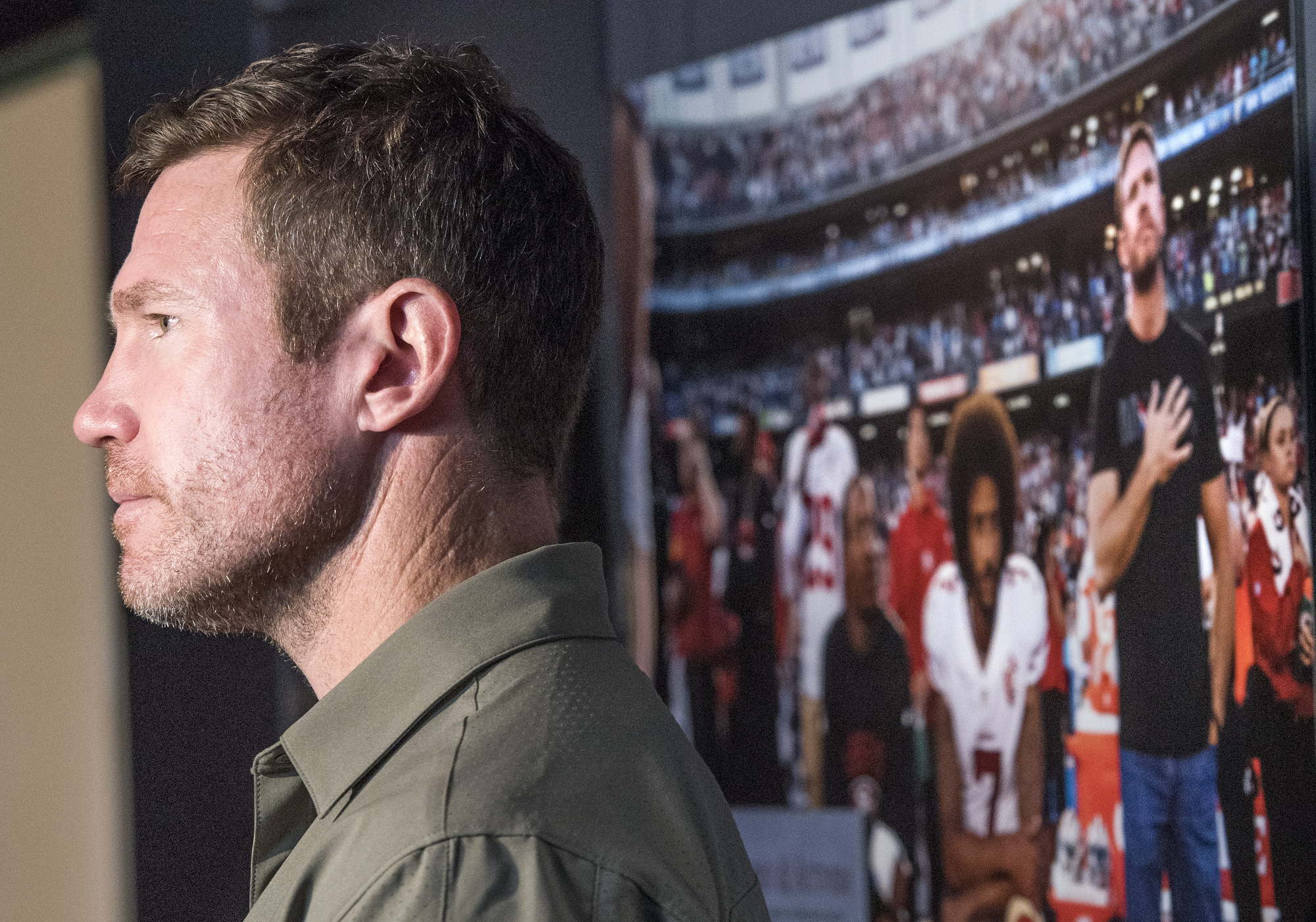
Boyer at the LBJ Presidential Library in 2018

Pre-draft measurables
Height	Weight	Arm length	Hand span	40-yard dash	10-yard split	20-yard split	20-yard shuttle	Three-cone drill	Bench press
5 ft 10 1/8 in (1.78 m)	216 lb (98 kg)	29 3/8 in (0.75 m)	9 in (0.23 m)	5.03 s	1.76 s	2.93 s	4.57 s	7.63 s	18 reps
All values from Texas' Pro Day

Boyer was not invited to the NFL Scouting Combine, although he attended Texas' Pro Day on March 24, 2015. Boyer later attended the San Francisco 49ers' Pro Day on April 17, 2015.

After going undrafted in the 2015 NFL draft, Boyer signed a free agent contract with the Seattle Seahawks on May 2, 2015. He was involved in three plays in the Seahawks' first preseason game against the Denver Broncos, and recorded a tackle. He was released by the Seahawks on August 18, 2015 to make room for quarterback Jake Waters.

During the Seahawks' 2016 preseason, as Colin Kaepernick had been sitting during the National Anthem, Boyer advised Kaepernick that, if he could not stand for the flag, then taking the knee would be more respectful than sitting. Per a new NBC interview with Kaepernick, it appears that he and Eric Reid had discussed the idea of kneeling rather than sitting for the National Anthem before talking with Boyer.

== In media ==
In 2015, Boyer and Fox Sports analyst Jay Glazer founded Merging Vets & Players (MVP), a foundation to support military veterans and retired athletes.

He appeared in the Madden NFL 18 video game's story mode Longshot as Captain McCarthy, a soldier who assists protagonist Devin Wade in rediscovering a love for football. Like Boyer, Devin was a Texas Longhorn and member of the Army, though Boyer stated the connection was coincidental; an ESPN documentary about Boyer was also titled The Long Shot. Boyer played a secret agent in the 2018 film Den of Thieves. Boyer also appeared in Mayans M.C. on FX as a private military contractor.

He began hosting the Discovery Channel reality competition series Survive the Raft in July 2023.

In 2020, Boyer starred in and produced his first feature film Secret of Sinchanee. He made his directorial debut in 2022 with MVP, which was inspired by his work with Merging Vets & Players and his colleagues in the 2nd Battalion, 7th Marines.
