= Thor Heyerdahl Upper Secondary School =

Upper secondary school in Larvik, Norway

- Thor Heyerdahl videregående skole
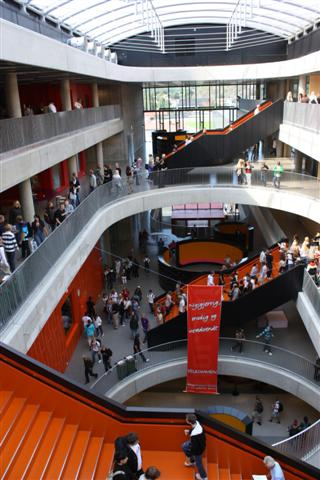
- Interior of new building on opening day, 17 August 2009

Location
- Hoffsgate 6; 3262 Larvik; Norway; 59°2′59″N 10°3′24″E

Information
- Established: 2004
- Rector: Lin Marie Holvik
- Staff: approx. 300
- Age range: 16–19

Thor Heyerdahl Upper Secondary School (Norwegian: Thor Heyerdahl videregående skole) is an upper secondary school in Larvik, Norway, named for the explorer Thor Heyerdahl, who was born in the city. It was formed by combining the previous upper secondary schools in Larvik. It is one of the largest upper secondary schools in Norway, with approximately 1,650 students as of December 2013, and offers 10 programmes or courses of instruction. The school was split between several locations until a new building, built as a combined project with Arena Larvik, opened on 17 August 2009.

== History ==
Thor Heyerdahl Upper Secondary School was formed in 2004 by the merger of the previously existing upper secondary schools in Larvik: Farris videregående skole (previously known as Larvik handelsskole, Larvik business school), Gloppe skole (previously Vestfold fylkes husflidskole, Vestfold handcrafts school), Kilden videregående skole (previously Larvik yrkesskole, Larvik vocational school) and Larvik gymnas (Larvik gymnasium). The gymnasium's history goes back to the foundation of Laurvigs Middelskole (Larvik Middle School) in 1824; the Thor Heyerdahl name was first used in 1994. The municipality of Larvik bought the gymnasium building and acquired Ahlefeldtsgate 6, 8 and 10 for 30.3 million kroner, but did not acquire the Farris or Gloppe school sites. On 17 August 2009 the school's new building opened, uniting all courses on a single campus. The official opening ceremony took place on 18 September. The building was designed by the Danish architecture firm of schmidt hammer lassen, who won the design competition in January 2006 in collaboration with the SLA landscape architecture firm with a proposal named Synergy. The project also included Arena Larvik, which the school uses for sports; foreseen in 2004 to cost 597 million kroner, after construction costs rose sharply the entire project was budgeted at 983 million kroner in November 2006. Construction began in June 2007 with the demolition of the old school; ground was broken for the new building in August. In the interim the school was housed in temporary space including a 900-square-metre (9,700 sq ft) tent. The new building has five storeys in addition to workshops; it is connected to the arena by a first-floor bridge. Interior decoration of the new building was budgeted at approximately 1.8 million kroner, the design scheme being chosen by a jury. The building was nominated for Building of the Year in its class by Byggeiindustrien.

In 2020, Lin Marie Holvik was announced as the school's new rector.

== Educational offerings and facilities ==
The school offers three university-preparatory and seven vocational courses plus special education; of the 12 national upper secondary courses of study or programmes, only agriculture is instead taught at another upper secondary school, Melsom videregående skole in Stokke.

The school building covers an area 80 metres (87 yd) square and has 34,000 square metres (370,000 sq ft) of instructional space, including 320 classrooms, 3,000 square metres (32,000 sq ft) of workshops, a six-hall arena space seating 4,000, three auditoria seating 45–180 people, and a 370-square-metre (4,000 sq ft) professional kitchen. The library is named Fatu Hiva after the Polynesian island on which Thor Heyerdahl spent his honeymoon in the 1930s.

11% of Thor Heyerdahl Upper Secondary School students speak a language other than Norwegian at home. The school is a focus school for the Nasjonalt senter for flerkulturell opplæring (National Centre for Multicultural Instruction) and was the first upper secondary school in Norway to make systematic use of bilingual education, beginning in August 2009.

== Operasjon Peru ==
A former student, Dag Petter Svendsen, launched Operasjon Peru (Operation Peru) in 1992 at one of the precursor schools, Larvik Handelsskole, as an alternative to the national Operasjon Dagsverk (Operation Day's Work). Both are student-organised charity actions to assist children in other countries in obtaining an education: the primary form of participation is for students to donate their pay from a day's work. Operasjon Peru specifically aids children in Peru and operates at Thor Heyerdahl Upper Secondary School, Re Upper Secondary School in Re, and Holmestrand Upper Secondary School in Holmestrand. In 1993, Svendsen founded La Aldea children's home on the outskirts of Chiclayo, and in 1996, Operasjon Peru also opened a school in Monsefú; in 2013 students at the three schools donated 786,000 kroner.
