= Thor Heyerdahl (ship) =

Motor ship with sails built in 1930

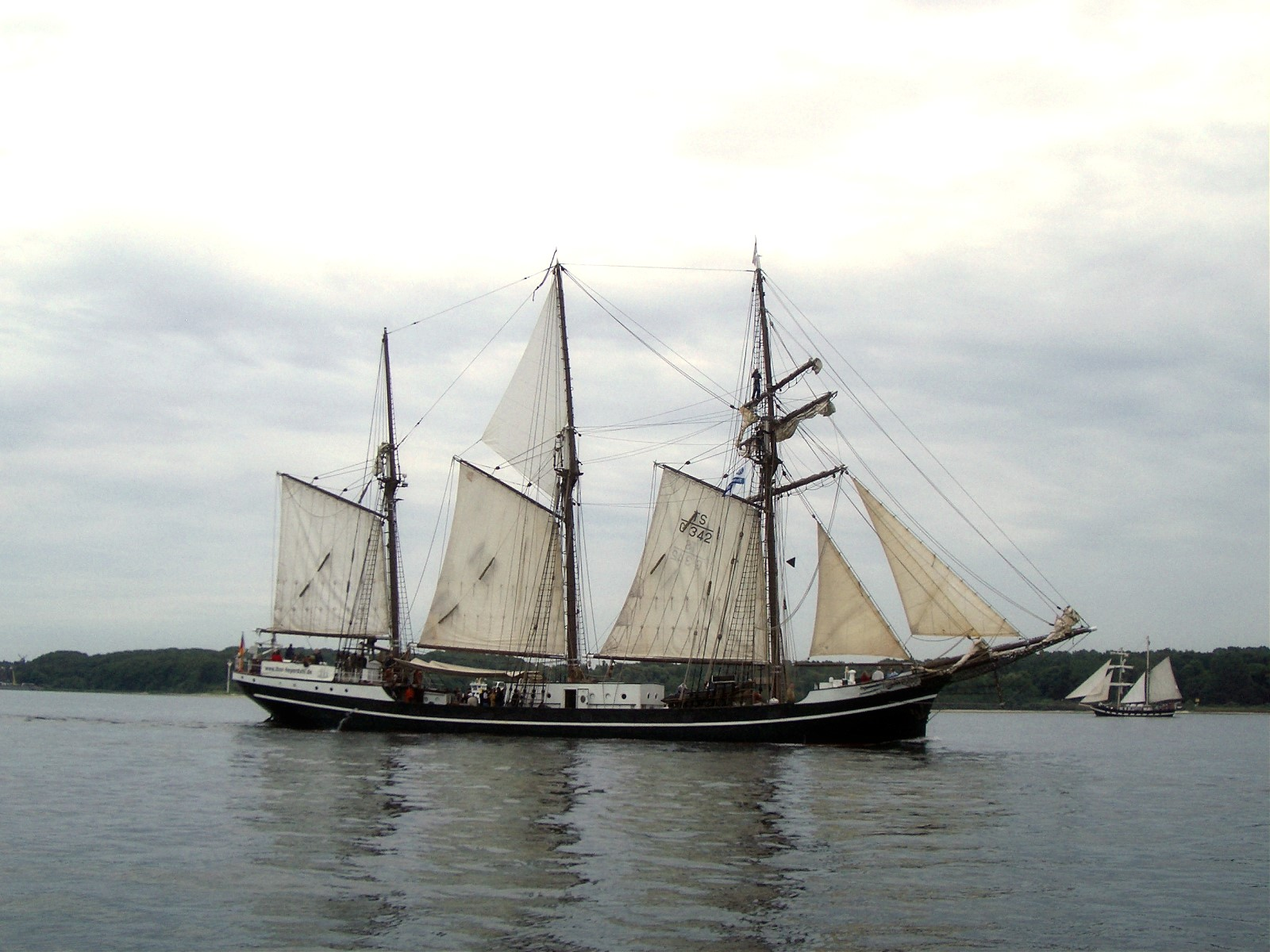
- Thor Heyerdahl at the Kiel Week 2007

History

Germany
- Name: Thor Heyerdahl
- Owner: Segelschiff Thor Heyerdahl gemeinnützige Fördergesellschaft mbH
- Launched: 1930
- Refit: In 1979-1983 as a three-masted topsail schooner
- Homeport: Kiel
- Identification: IMO number: 5221491; MMSI number: 211232340; Callsign: DKQH
- Status: Active

General characteristics
- Length: 49.48 m overall (formerly 49.83 m); hull: 42.50 m
- Beam: 6,53 m
- Height: 29 m
- Draft: 2.90 m (formerly 2.55 m)
- Propulsion: 400 PS Deutz-Diesel, 6 cylinders,* 1951, 400/min max.
- Sail plan: three-masted topsail schooner (830 m²)

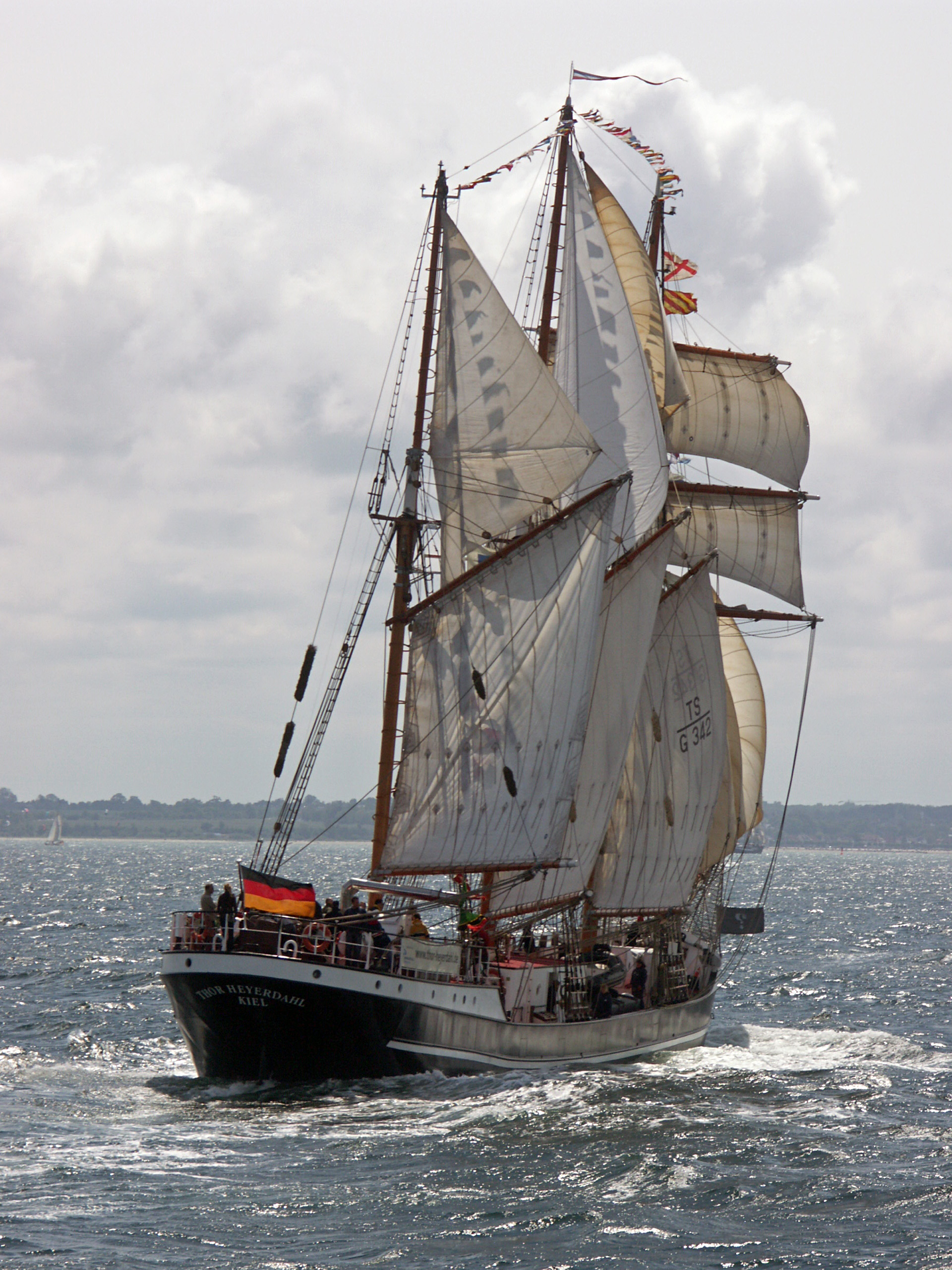
Stern view (2009 off Kiel)

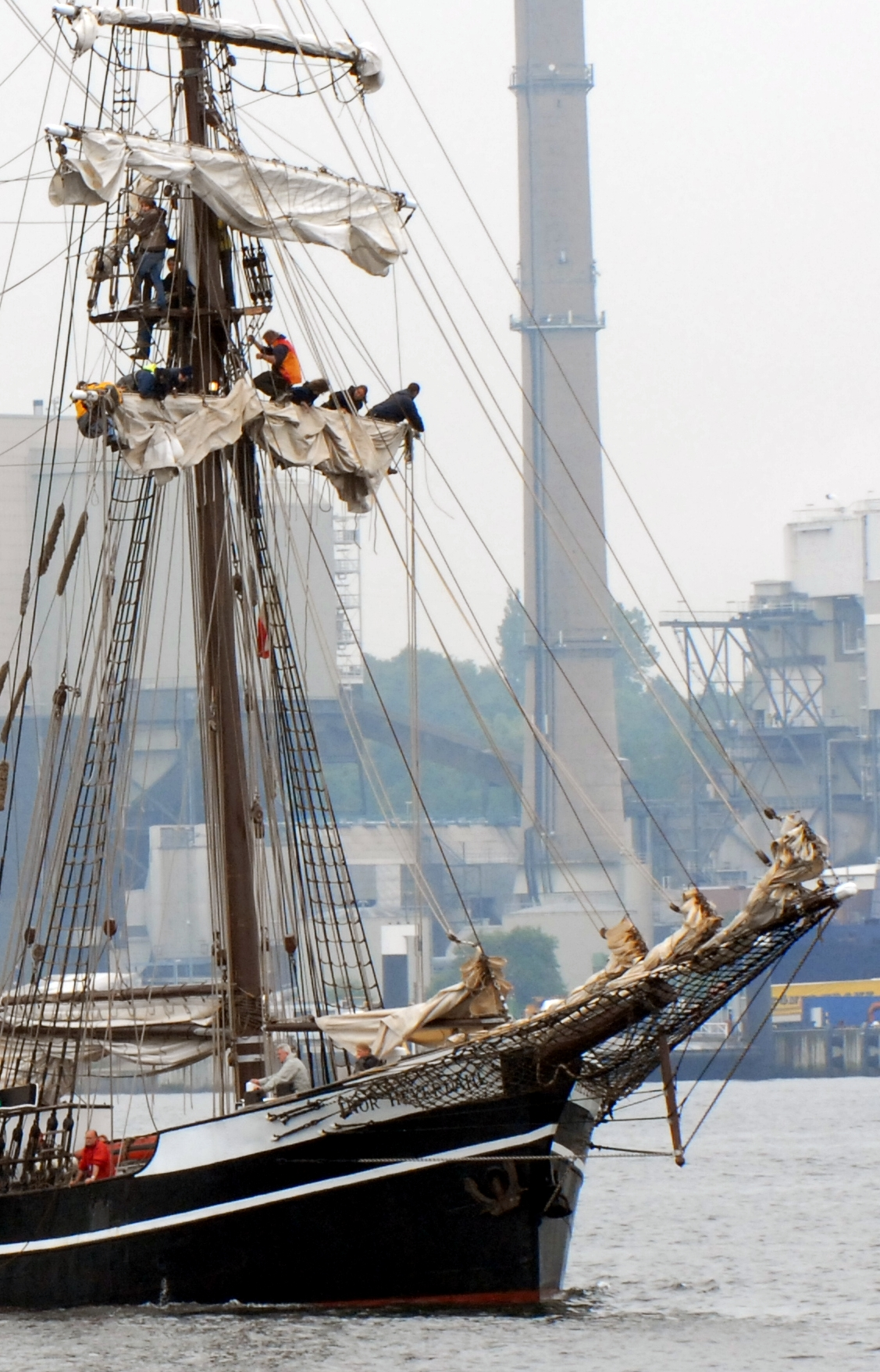
Work in the rig, 2007

Thor Heyerdahl (named after Thor Heyerdahl), originally named Tinka, later Marga Henning, Silke, and Minnow, was built as a freight carrying motor ship with auxiliary sails at the shipyard Smit & Zoon in Westerbroek, Netherlands, in 1930. Her original homeport being Hamburg, Germany, she was used for the next 50 years as a freighter. Eventually sailing under the flag of Panama as Minnow and then awaiting further use in Germany, she was bought in 1979 by two sailing enthusiasts, who turned the now run-down ship into a topsail schooner to use it for sail training, especially for teenagers and young adults. One of the two original owners was Detlef Soitzek, who had sailed with the Norwegian anthropologist, zoologist, ethnologist and adventurer Thor Heyerdahl on his Tigris expedition in 1977/1978, and suggested naming the ship after the famous researcher and adventurer. The ownership of the ship was subsequently turned over to an association.

From spring to fall, Thor Heyerdahl sails mainly the Baltic Sea and participates in international sail training events. In winter, the ship has repeatedly crossed the Atlantic Ocean and sailed in the Caribbean, especially as classroom under sails with teenage crews.
