= Thor Heyerdahl =

Norwegian anthropologist and adventurer (1914–2002)

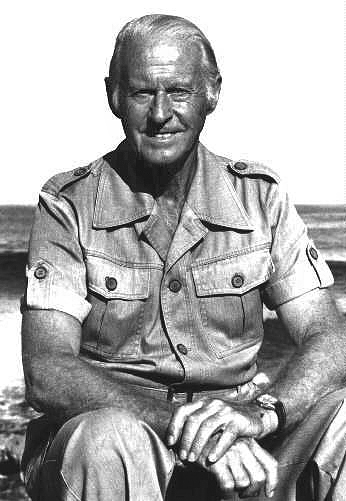
- Heyerdahl c. 1980
- Born: 6 October 1914; Larvik, Norway
- Died: 18 April 2002 (aged 87); Colla Micheri, Italy
- Education: University of Oslo
- Spouses: Liv Coucheron-Torp (m. 1936; div. 1947) Yvonne Dedekam-Simonsen (m. 1949; div. 1979) Jacqueline Beer (m. 1991)
- Children: 5
- Awards: Mungo Park Medal (1950)
- Scientific career
- Fields: Ethnography; Adventure
- Doctoral advisor: Kristine Bonnevie; Hjalmar Broch

Thor Heyerdahl KStJ (Norwegian pronunciation: [tuːr ˈhæ̀ɪəɖɑːɫ]; 6 October 1914 – 18 April 2002) was a Norwegian adventurer and ethnographer with a background in biology with specialization in zoology, botany and geography.

Heyerdahl is notable for his Kon-Tiki expedition in 1947, in which he drifted 8,000 km (5,000 mi) across the Pacific Ocean in a primitive hand-built raft from South America to the Tuamotu Islands. The expedition was supposed to demonstrate that the legendary sun-worshiping red-haired, bearded, and white-skinned "Tiki people" from South America drifted and colonized Polynesia first, before actual Polynesian peoples. His hyperdiffusionist ideas on ancient cultures had been widely rejected by the scientific community, even before the expedition.

Heyerdahl made other voyages to demonstrate the possibility of contact between widely separated ancient peoples, notably the Ra II expedition of 1970, when he sailed from the west coast of Africa to Barbados in a papyrus reed boat. He was appointed a government scholar in 1984 by the Norwegian government.

He died on 18 April 2002 in Colla Micheri, Italy, while visiting close family members. The Norwegian government gave him a state funeral in Oslo Cathedral on 26 April 2002.

In May 2011, the Thor Heyerdahl Archives were added to UNESCO's Memory of the World Register. At the time, this list included 238 collections from all over the world. The Heyerdahl Archives span the years 1937 to 2002 and include his photographic collection, diaries, private letters, expedition plans, articles, newspaper clippings, and original book and article manuscripts. The Heyerdahl Archives are administered by the Kon-Tiki Museum and the National Library of Norway in Oslo.

== Youth and personal life ==
Heyerdahl was born in Larvik, Norway, the son of master brewer Thor Heyerdahl (1869–1957) and his wife, Alison Lyng (1873–1965). His cousin on his mother's side was the politician John Lyng. As a young child, Heyerdahl showed a strong interest in zoology, inspired by his mother, who had a strong interest in Charles Darwin's theory of evolution. He created a small museum in his childhood home, with a common adder (Vipera berus) as the main attraction.

He studied zoology and geography at the faculty of biological science at the University of Oslo. At the same time, he privately studied Polynesian culture and history, consulting what was then the world's largest private collection of books and papers on Polynesia, owned by Bjarne Kroepelien, a wealthy wine merchant in Oslo. (This collection was later purchased by the University of Oslo Library from Kroepelien's heirs and was attached to the Kon-Tiki Museum research department.)

After seven terms and consultations with experts in Berlin, a project was developed and sponsored by Heyerdahl's zoology professors, Kristine Bonnevie and Hjalmar Broch. He was to visit some isolated Pacific island groups and study how the local animals had found their way there.

On the day before they sailed together to the Marquesas Islands in 1936, Heyerdahl married Liv Coucheron-Torp (1916–1969), whom he had met at the University of Oslo, and who had studied economics there. He was 22 years old and she was 20 years old. Eventually, the couple had two sons: Thor Jr. (1938–2024) and Bjørn (1940–2021). The marriage ended in divorce shortly before the 1947 Kon-Tiki expedition, which Liv had helped to organize.

After the occupation of Norway by Nazi Germany, he served with the Free Norwegian Forces from 1944, in the far north province of Finnmark.

In 1949, Heyerdahl married Yvonne Dedekam-Simonsen (1924–2006). They had three daughters: Annette, Marian, and Helene Elisabeth. They were divorced in 1979. Heyerdahl blamed their separation on his being away from home and differences in their ideas for bringing up children. In his autobiography, he concluded that he should take the entire blame for their separation.

In 1991, Heyerdahl married Jacqueline Beer (born 1932) as his third wife. They lived in Tenerife, Canary Islands, and were very actively involved with archaeological projects, especially in Túcume, Peru, and Azov until his death in 2002. He had still been hoping to undertake an archaeological project in Samoa before he died.

== Fatu Hiva ==
In 1936, on the day after his marriage to Liv Coucheron Torp, the young couple set out for the South Pacific Island of Fatu Hiva. They nominally had an academic mission, to research the spread of animal species between islands, but in reality they intended to "run away to the South Seas" and never return home.

Aided by expedition funding from their parents, they nonetheless arrived on the island lacking "provisions, weapons or a radio". Residents in Tahiti, where they stopped en route, did convince them to take a machete and a cooking pot.

They arrived at Fatu Hiva in 1937, in the valley of Omo‘a, and decided to cross over the island's mountainous interior to settle in one of the small, nearly abandoned, valleys on the eastern side of the island. There, they made their thatch-covered stilted home in the valley of Uia.

Living in such primitive conditions was a daunting task, but they managed to live off the land, and work on their academic goals, by collecting and studying zoological and botanical specimens. They discovered unusual artifacts, listened to the natives' oral history traditions, and took note of the prevailing winds and ocean currents.

It was in this setting, surrounded by the ruins of the formerly glorious Marquesan civilization, that Heyerdahl first developed his theories regarding the possibility of pre-Columbian trans-oceanic contact between the pre-European Polynesians, and the peoples and cultures of South America.

Despite the seemingly idyllic situation, the exposure to various tropical diseases and other difficulties caused them to return to civilisation a year later. They worked together to write an account of their adventure.

The events surrounding his stay on the Marquesas, most of the time on Fatu Hiva, were told first in his book På Jakt etter Paradiset (Hunt for Paradise) (1938), which was published in Norway but, following the outbreak of World War II, was never translated and remained largely forgotten. Many years later, having achieved notability with other adventures and books on other subjects, Heyerdahl published a new account of this voyage under the title Fatu Hiva (London: Allen & Unwin, 1974). The story of his time on Fatu Hiva and his side trip to Hivaoa and Mohotani is also related in Green Was the Earth on the Seventh Day (Random House, 1996).

== Kon-Tiki expedition ==
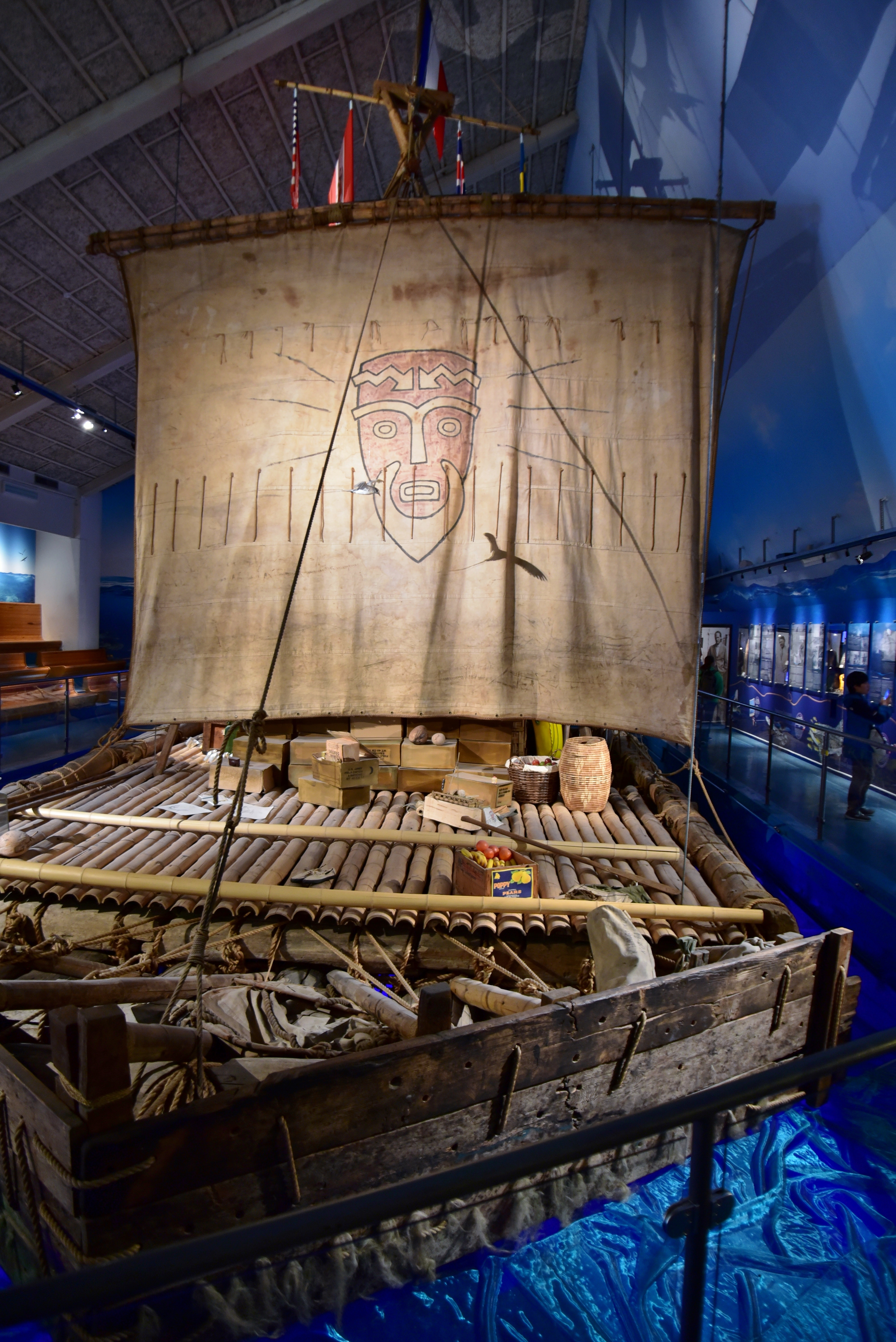
The Kon-Tiki in the Kon-Tiki Museum in Oslo, Norway

In 1947 Heyerdahl and five fellow adventurers sailed from Peru to the Tuamotu Islands, French Polynesia in a raft that they had constructed from balsa wood and other native materials, christened the Kon-Tiki. The Kon-Tiki expedition was inspired by old reports and drawings made by the Spanish Conquistadors of Inca rafts, and by native legends and archaeological evidence suggesting contact between South America and Polynesia. The Kon-Tiki smashed into the reef at Raroia in the Tuamotus on 7 August 1947 after a 101-day, 4,300-nautical-mile (5,000-mile or 8,000 km) journey across the Pacific Ocean. Heyerdahl had nearly drowned at least twice in childhood and did not take easily to water; he said later that there were times in each of his raft voyages when he feared for his life.

Heyerdahl believed he had proven his theory of accidental settlement of Polynesia, in which he assumed that Polynesians lacked the skills, knowledge, and technology of reaching remote islands intentionally. However, Heyerdahl’s raft had no windward sailing capability and was only capable of drifting downwind. Thus, his theory could not account for the similarities of Polynesian societies on islands from Hawaii to Tahiti. Instead, the 1976 voyage by the Polynesian Voyaging Society of the performance-accurate Polynesian voyaging canoe Hōkūleʻa demonstrated the historic ability of Polynesian voyagers to sail on a reach, across the trade winds which parallel the Earth’s latitude and switch direct on opposite sides of the equator.

Heyerdahl's book about The Kon-Tiki Expedition: By Raft Across the South Seas has been translated into 70 languages. The documentary film of the expedition entitled Kon-Tiki won an Academy Award in 1951. A dramatised version was released in 2012, also called Kon-Tiki, and was nominated for both the Best Foreign Language Oscar at the 85th Academy Awards and a Golden Globe Award for Best Foreign Language Film at the 70th Golden Globe Awards. It was the first time that a Norwegian film was nominated for both an Oscar and a Golden Globe.

=== Expedition to Easter Island ===
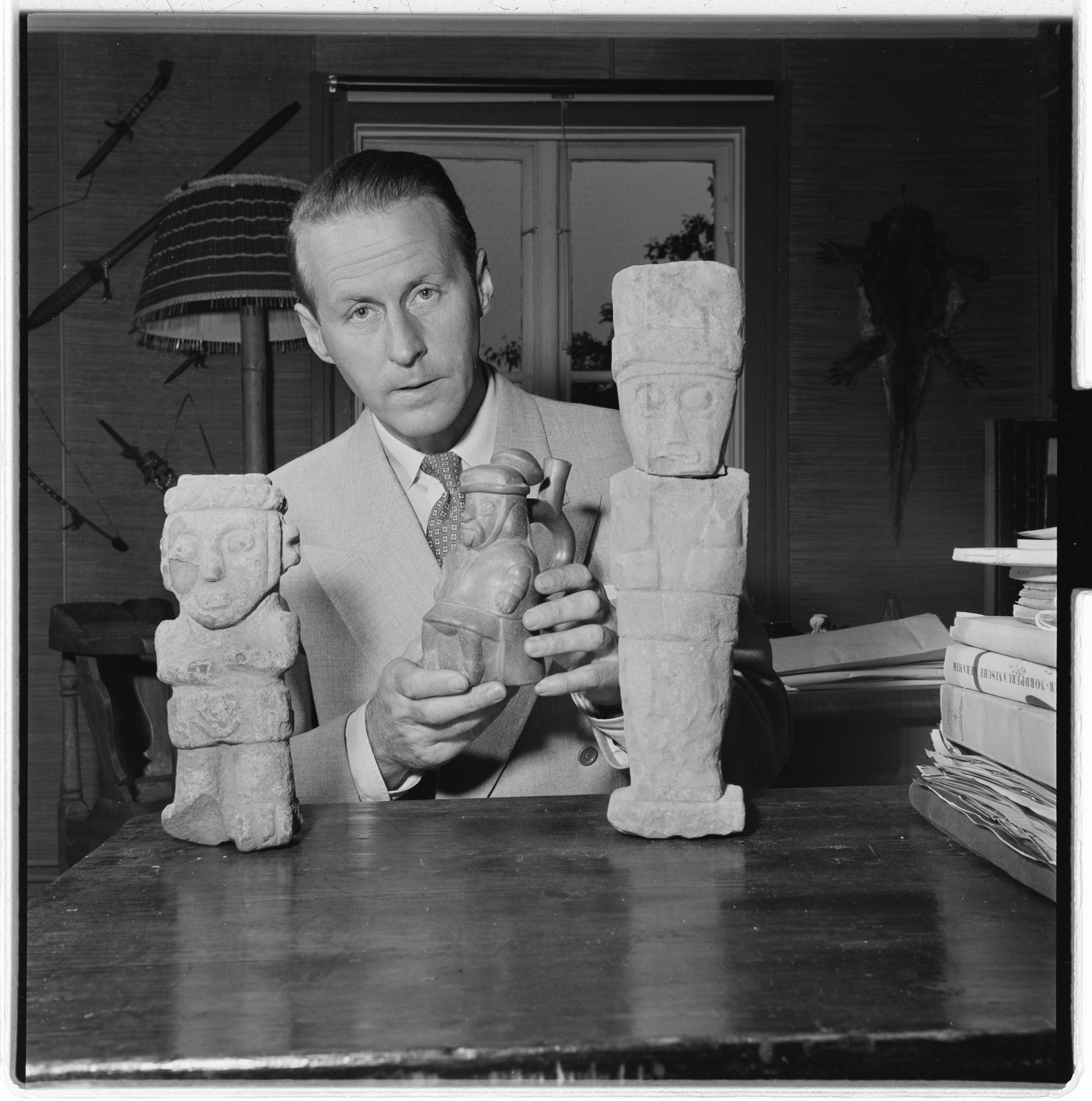
Thor Heyerdahl, in 1955

In 1955–1956, Heyerdahl organised the Norwegian Archaeological Expedition to Easter Island. The expedition's scientific staff included Arne Skjølsvold, Carlyle Smith, Edwin Ferdon, Gonzalo Figueroa and William Mulloy. Heyerdahl and the professional archaeologists who travelled with him spent several months on Easter Island investigating several important archaeological sites. Highlights of the project include experiments in the carving, transport and erection of the notable moai, as well as excavations at such prominent sites as Orongo and Poike. The expedition published two large volumes of scientific reports (Reports of the Norwegian Archaeological Expedition to Easter Island and the East Pacific) and Heyerdahl later added a third (The Art of Easter Island). Heyerdahl's popular book on the subject, Aku-Aku was another international best-seller.

In Easter Island: The Mystery Solved (Random House, 1989), Heyerdahl offered a more detailed theory of the island's history. Working with Rapanui archaeologist Sonia Haoa Cardinali and using other Rapanui evidence, he claimed the island was originally colonised by Hanau eepe ("Long Ears"), from South America, and that Polynesian Hanau momoko ("Short Ears") arrived only in the mid-16th century; they may have come independently or perhaps were imported as workers. According to Heyerdahl, something happened between Admiral Roggeveen's discovery of the island in 1722 and James Cook's visit in 1774; while Roggeveen encountered white, Indian, and Polynesian people living in relative harmony and prosperity, Cook encountered a much smaller population consisting mainly of Polynesians and living in privation. Heyerdahl notes the oral tradition of an uprising of "Short Ears" against the ruling "Long Ears." The "Long Ears" dug a defensive moat on the eastern end of the island and filled it with kindling. During the uprising, Heyerdahl claimed, the "Long Ears" ignited their moat and retreated behind it, but the "Short Ears" found a way around it, came up from behind, and pushed all but two of the "Long Ears" into the fire. This moat was found by the Norwegian expedition and it was partly cut down into the rock. Layers of fire were revealed but no fragments of bodies.

=== Theory on Polynesian origins ===
The basis of the Kon-Tiki expedition was Heyerdahl's belief that the original inhabitants of Easter Island (and the rest of Polynesia) were the "Tiki people", a race of "white bearded men" who supposedly originally sailed from Peru. He described these "Tiki people" as being a sun-worshipping fair-skinned people with blue eyes, fair or red hair, tall statures, and beards. He further said that these people were originally from the Middle East, and had crossed the Atlantic earlier to found the great Mesoamerican civilizations. By 500 CE, a branch of these people were supposedly forced out into Tiahuanaco where they became the ruling class of the Inca Empire and set out to voyage into the Pacific Ocean under the leadership of "Con Ticci Viracocha".

Main migration routes of the Austronesian Expansion (c. 3000 to 1500 BCE) based on archaeological, linguistic, and genetic studies, as opposed to Heyerdahl's eastern origin hypothesis

Heyerdahl said that when the Europeans first came to the Pacific islands, they were astonished that they found some of the natives to have relatively light skins and beards. There were whole families that had pale skin, hair varying in colour from reddish to blonde. In contrast, most of the Polynesians had golden-brown skin, raven-black hair, and rather flat noses. Heyerdahl claimed that when Jacob Roggeveen discovered Easter Island in 1722, he supposedly noticed that many of the natives were white-skinned. Heyerdahl claimed that these people could count their ancestors who were "white-skinned" right back to the time of Tiki and Hotu Matua, when they first came sailing across the sea "from a mountainous land in the east which was scorched by the sun". The ethnographic evidence for these claims is outlined in Heyerdahl's book Aku-Aku: The Secret of Easter Island. He argued that the monumental statues known as moai resembled sculptures more typical of pre-Columbian Peru than any Polynesian designs. He believed that the Easter Island myth of a power struggle between two peoples called the Hanau epe and Hanau momoko was a memory of conflicts between the original inhabitants of the island and a later wave of "Native Americans" from the Northwest coast, eventually leading to the annihilation of the Hanau epe and the destruction of the island's culture and once-prosperous economy. Heyerdahl described these later "Native American" migrants as "Maori-Polynesians" who were supposedly Asians who crossed over the Bering land bridge into Northwest America before sailing westward towards Polynesia (the westward direction is because he refused to accept that Polynesians were capable of sailing against winds and currents). He associated them with the Tlingit and Haida peoples and characterized them as "inferior" to the Tiki people.

Despite these claims, DNA sequence analysis of Easter Island's current inhabitants indicates that the 36 people living on Rapa Nui who survived the devastating internecine wars, slave raids, and epidemics of the 19th century and had any offspring were Polynesian. Furthermore, examination of skeletons offers evidence of only Polynesian origins for Rapa Nui living on the island after 1680.

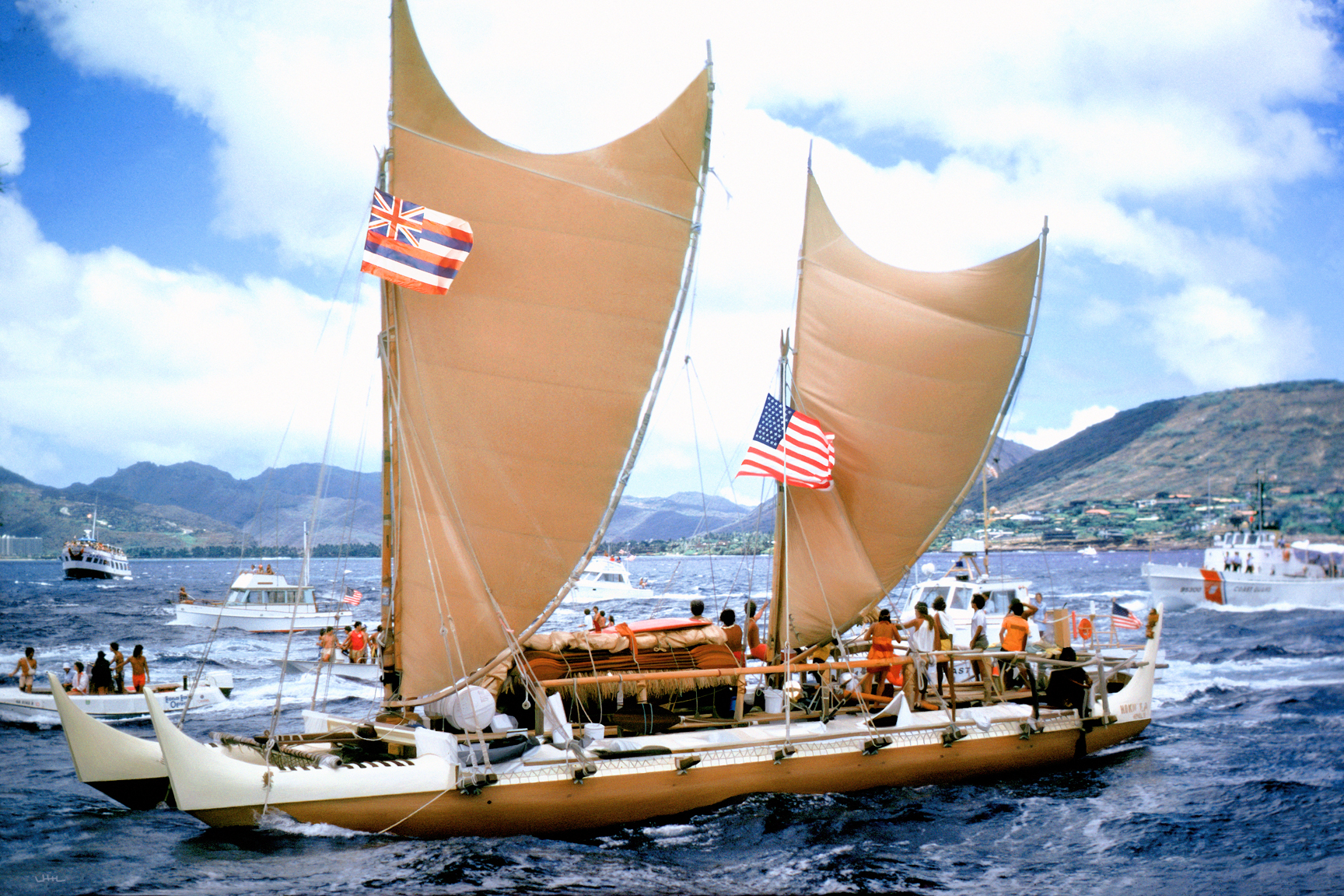
The Hōkūleʻa, a performance-accurate replica of a Polynesian double-hulled wa'a kaulua voyaging canoe, sailed from Hawaiʻi to Tahiti against prevailing winds in 1976, partly to disprove Heyerdahl's drift hypothesis on his much more primitive and unsteerable Kon-Tiki balsa raft

Heyerdahl's hypothesis of Polynesian origins from the Americas is considered pseudoscientific and racially controversial, and has not gained acceptance among scientists (even prior to the voyage). It is overwhelmingly rejected by scientists today. Archaeological, linguistic, cultural, and genetic evidence all support a western origin (from Island Southeast Asia) for Polynesians via the Austronesian expansion. "Drift voyaging" from South America was also deemed "extremely unlikely" in 1973 by computer modeling.

The 1976 voyage of the Hōkūleʻa, a performance-accurate replica of a Polynesian double-hulled wa'a kaulua voyaging canoe, from Hawaiʻi to Tahiti was partly a demonstration to prove that Heyerdahl was wrong. The Hōkūleʻa sailed against prevailing winds and exclusively used wayfinding and celestial Polynesian navigation techniques (unlike the modern equipment and charts of the Kon-Tiki). Hōkūleʻa also remains fully operational, and has since completed ten other voyages, including a three-year circumnavigation of the planet from 2014 to 2017, with other sister ships.

Heyerdahl's hypothesis was part of early Eurocentric hyperdiffusionism and the westerner disbelief that (non-white) "stone-age" peoples with "no math" could colonize islands separated by vast distances of ocean water, even against prevailing winds and currents. He rejected the highly skilled voyaging and navigating traditions of the Austronesian peoples and instead argued that Polynesia was settled from boats following the wind and currents for navigation from South America. As such, the Kon-Tiki was deliberately a primitive raft and unsteerable, in contrast to the sophisticated outrigger canoes and catamarans of the Austronesian people.

Anthropologist Robert Carl Suggs included a chapter titled "The Kon-Tiki Myth" in his 1960 book on Polynesia, concluding that "The Kon-Tiki theory is about as plausible as the tales of Atlantis, Mu, and 'Children of the Sun.' Like most such theories, it makes exciting light reading, but as an example of scientific method it fares quite poorly." Anthropologist and National Geographic Explorer-in-Residence Wade Davis also criticized Heyerdahl's theory in his 2009 book The Wayfinders, which explores the history of Polynesia. Davis says that Heyerdahl "ignored the overwhelming body of linguistic, ethnographic, and ethnobotanical evidence, augmented today by genetic and archaeological data, indicating that he was patently wrong." Paul Theroux, in his book The Happy Isles of Oceania, also criticizes Heyerdahl for trying to link the culture of Polynesian islands with the Peruvian culture.

Recent scientific investigation that compares the DNA of some of the Polynesian islands with natives from Peru suggests that there is some merit to some of Heyerdahl's ideas and that while Polynesia was colonized from Asia, some contact with South America also existed; a number of papers have in the last few years confirmed with genetic data some form of contacts with Easter Island. Responding to one of these papers, archaeologist Terry Hunt said "It is good to see this kind of research, but a definitive answer isn't really possible given the lack of chronological control... Native American genes reaching Rapa Nui with European contact cannot be ruled out."

== Boats Ra and Ra II ==
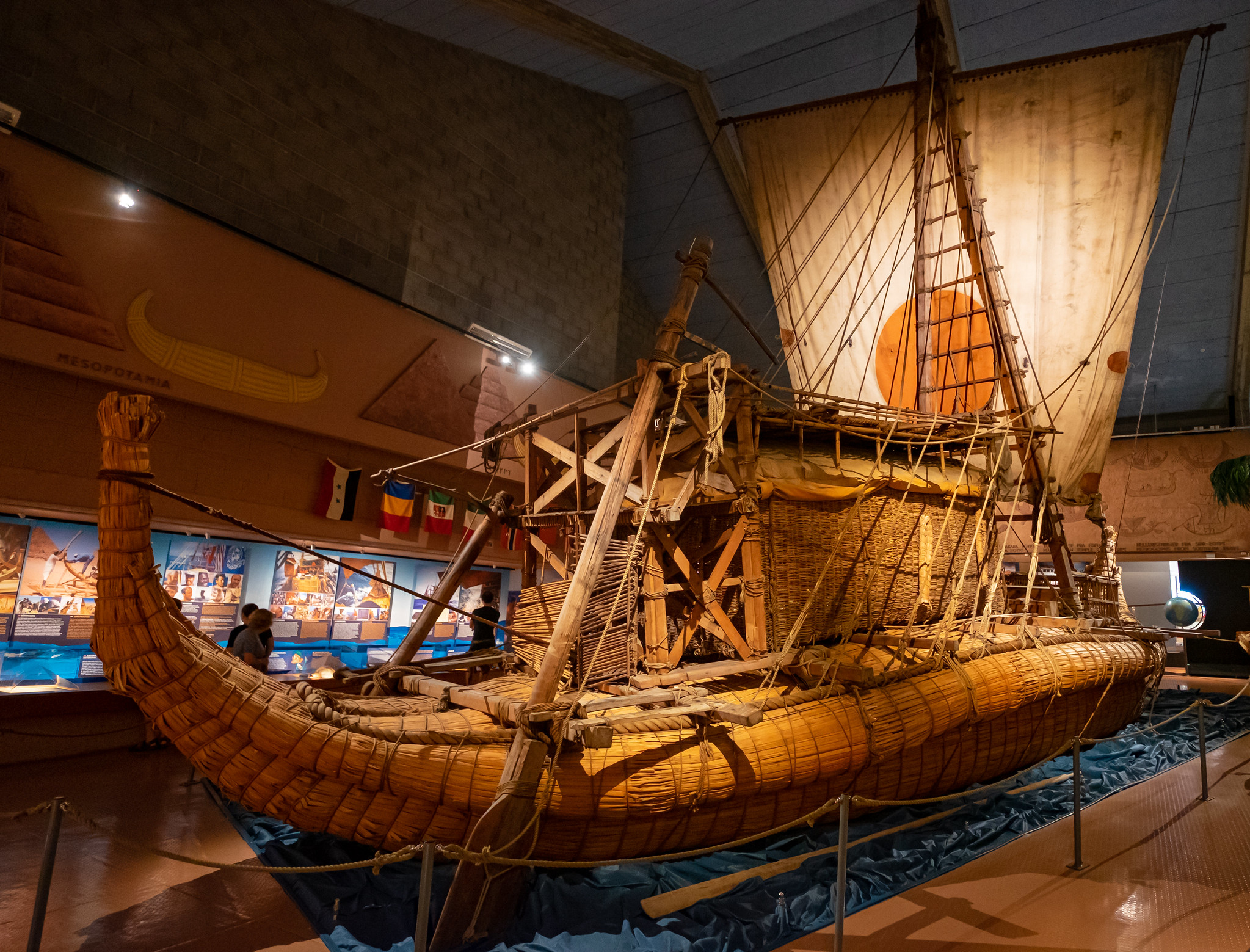
The Ra II in the Kon-Tiki Museum

In 1969 and 1970, Heyerdahl built two boats from papyrus and attempted to cross the Atlantic Ocean from Morocco in Africa. Based on drawings and models from ancient Egypt, the first boat, named Ra (after the Egyptian Sun god), was constructed by boat builders from Lake Chad using papyrus reed obtained from Lake Tana in Ethiopia and launched into the Atlantic Ocean from the coast of Morocco. The Ra crew included Thor Heyerdahl (Norway), Norman Baker (US), Carlo Mauri (Italy), Yuri Senkevich (USSR), Santiago Genovés (Mexico), Georges Sourial (Egypt), and Abdullah Djibrine (Chad). Only Heyerdahl and Baker had sailing and navigation experience. Genovés would go on to head the Acali Experiment.

After a number of weeks, Ra took on water. The crew discovered that a key element of the Egyptian boatbuilding method had been neglected, a tether that acted like a spring to keep the stern high in the water while allowing for flexibility. Water and storms eventually caused it to sag and break apart after sailing more than 6,400 km (4,000 miles). The crew was forced to abandon Ra, some hundred miles (160 km) before the Caribbean islands, and was saved by a yacht.

The following year, 1970, a similar vessel, Ra II, was built from Ethiopian papyrus by Bolivian citizens Demetrio, Juan and José Limachi of Lake Titicaca, and likewise set sail across the Atlantic from Morocco, this time with great success. The crew was mostly the same; though Djibrine had been replaced by Kei Ohara from Japan and Madani Ait Ouhanni from Morocco. The boat reached Barbados, thus demonstrating that mariners could have dealt with trans-Atlantic voyages by sailing with the Canary Current. The Ra II is now in the Kon-Tiki Museum in Oslo, Norway.

The book The Ra Expeditions and the film documentary Ra (1972) were made about the voyages. Apart from the primary aspects of the expedition, Heyerdahl deliberately selected a crew representing a great diversity in race, nationality, religion and political viewpoint in order to demonstrate that, at least on their own little floating island, people could co-operate and live peacefully. Additionally, the expedition took samples of marine pollution and presented its report to the United Nations.

== Tigris ==
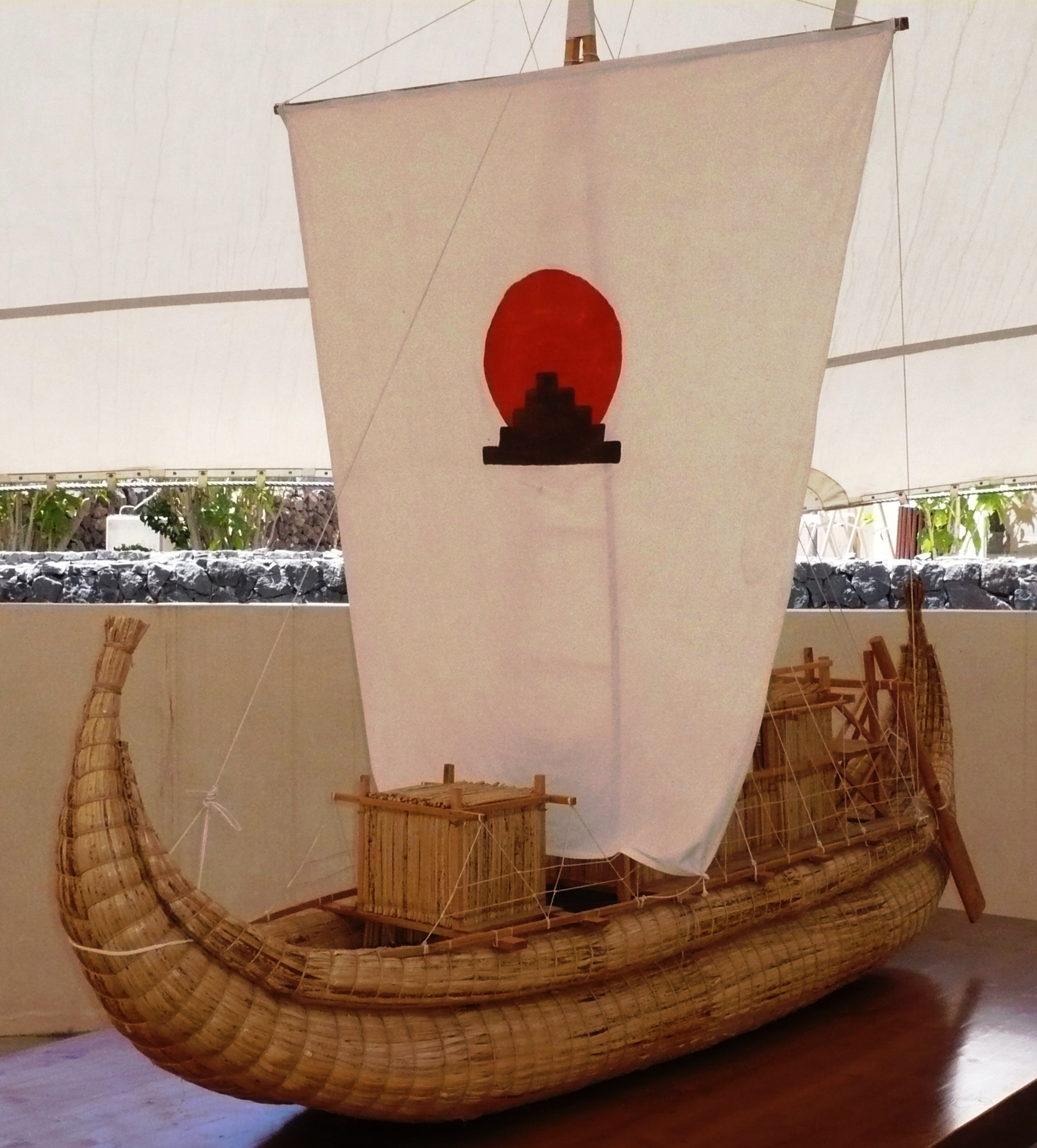
Model of the Tigris at the Pyramids of Güímar, Tenerife.

Heyerdahl built yet another reed boat in 1977, Tigris, which was intended to demonstrate that trade and migration could have linked Mesopotamia with the Indus Valley civilization in what is now Pakistan and western India. Tigris was built in Al Qurnah Iraq and sailed with its international crew through the Persian Gulf to Pakistan and made its way into the Red Sea.

After about five months at sea and still remaining seaworthy, the Tigris was deliberately burnt in Djibouti on 3 April 1978 as a protest against the wars raging on every side in the Red Sea and Horn of Africa. In his Open Letter to the UN Secretary-General Kurt Waldheim, Heyerdahl explained his reasons:

Today we burn our proud ship ... to protest against inhuman elements in the world of 1978 ... Now we are forced to stop at the entrance to the Red Sea. Surrounded by military airplanes and warships from the world's most civilized and developed nations, we have been denied permission by friendly governments, for reasons of security, to land anywhere, but in the tiny, and still neutral, Republic of Djibouti. Elsewhere around us, brothers and neighbors are engaged in homicide with means made available to them by those who lead humanity on our joint road into the third millennium.

To the innocent masses in all industrialized countries, we direct our appeal. We must wake up to the insane reality of our time ... We are all irresponsible, unless we demand from the responsible decision makers that modern armaments must no longer be made available to people whose former battle axes and swords our ancestors condemned.

Our planet is bigger than the reed bundles that have carried us across the seas, and yet small enough to run the same risks unless those of us still alive open our eyes and minds to the desperate need of intelligent collaboration to save ourselves and our common civilization from what we are about to convert into a sinking ship.

In the years that followed, Heyerdahl was often outspoken on issues of international peace and the environment.

The Tigris had an 11-man crew: Thor Heyerdahl (Norway), Norman Baker (US), Carlo Mauri (Italy), Yuri Senkevich (USSR), Germán Carrasco (Mexico), Hans Petter Bohn (Norway), Rashad Nazar Salim (Iraq), Norris Brock (US), Toru Suzuki (Japan), Detlef Soitzek (Germany), and Asbjørn Damhus (Denmark).

== "The Search for Odin" in Azerbaijan and Russia ==
=== Background ===
Heyerdahl made four visits to Azerbaijan in 1981, 1994, 1999 and 2000. Heyerdahl had long been fascinated with the rock carvings that date back to about 8th–7th millennia BCE at Gobustan (about 30 miles/48 km west of Baku). He was convinced that their artistic style closely resembled the carvings found in his native Norway. The ship designs, in particular, were regarded by Heyerdahl as similar and drawn with a simple sickle-shaped line, representing the base of the boat, with vertical lines on deck, illustrating crew or, perhaps, raised oars.

Based on this and other published documentation, Heyerdahl proposed that Azerbaijan was the site of an ancient advanced civilization. He believed that natives migrated north through waterways to present-day Scandinavia using ingeniously constructed vessels made of skins that could be folded like cloth. When voyagers travelled upstream, they conveniently folded their skin boats and transported them on pack animals.

=== Snorri Sturluson ===
On Heyerdahl's visit to Baku in 1999, he lectured at the Academy of Sciences about the history of ancient Nordic Kings. He spoke of a notation made by Snorri Sturluson, a 13th-century historian-mythographer in Ynglinga Saga, which relates that "Odin (a Scandinavian god who was one of the kings) came to the North with his people from a country called Aser." (see also House of Ynglings and Mythological kings of Sweden). Heyerdahl accepted Snorri's story as literal truth, and believed that a chieftain led his people in a migration from the east, westward and northward through Saxony, to Fyn in Denmark, and eventually settling in Sweden. Heyerdahl claimed that the geographic location of the mythic Aser or Æsir matched the region of contemporary Azerbaijan – "east of the Caucasus mountains and the Black Sea". "We are no longer talking about mythology," Heyerdahl said, "but of the realities of geography and history. Azerbaijanis should be proud of their ancient culture. It is just as rich and ancient as that of China and Mesopotamia."

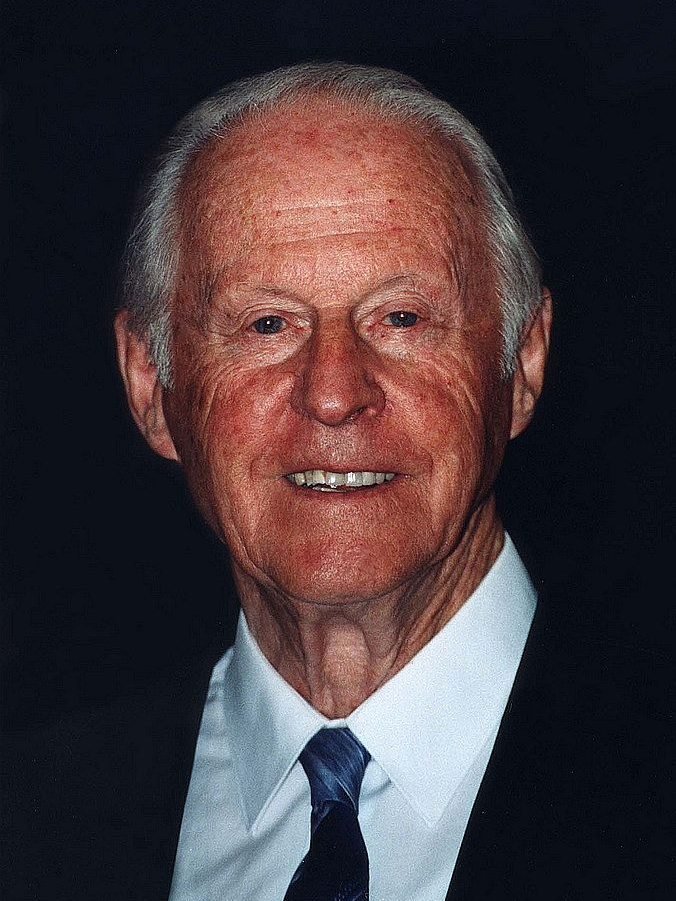
Thor Heyerdahl in 2000

In September 2000 Heyerdahl returned to Baku for the fourth time and visited the archaeological dig in the area of the Church of Kish.

=== Revision of hypothesis ===
One of the last projects of his life, Jakten på Odin, 'The Search for Odin', was a sudden revision of his Odin hypothesis, in furtherance of which he initiated excavations in Azov, Russia, near the Sea of Azov at the northeast of the Black Sea during 2001–2002. He searched for the remains of a civilization to match the account of Odin in Snorri Sturlusson, significantly further north of his original target of Azerbaijan on the Caspian Sea only two years earlier. This project generated harsh criticism and accusations of pseudoscience from historians, archaeologists and linguists in Norway, who accused Heyerdahl of selective use of sources, and a basic lack of scientific methodology in his work.

His central claims were based on similarities of names in Norse mythology and geographic names in the Black Sea region, e.g. Azov and Æsir, Udi and Odin, Tyr and Turkey. Philologists and historians reject these parallels as mere coincidences, and also anachronisms, for instance the city of Azov did not have that name until over 1,000 years after Heyerdahl claims the Æsir dwelt there. The controversy surrounding the Search for Odin project was in many ways typical of the relationship between Heyerdahl and the academic community. His theories rarely won any scientific acceptance, whereas Heyerdahl himself rejected all scientific criticism and concentrated on publishing his theories in popular books aimed at the general public.

As of 2025, Heyerdahl's Odin hypothesis has yet to be validated by any historian, archaeologist or linguist.

== Pyramids of Güímar ==
In 1991 he studied the Pyramids of Güímar on Tenerife and declared that they were not random stone heaps but pyramids. Based on the discovery made by the astrophysicists Aparicio, Belmonte and Esteban, from the Instituto de Astrofísica de Canarias that the "pyramids" were astronomically orientated and being convinced that they were of ancient origin, he claimed that the ancient people who built them were most likely sun worshippers. Heyerdahl hypothesized that the Canarian pyramids formed a temporal and geographic stopping point on voyages between ancient Egypt and the Maya civilization, initiating a controversy in which historians, esoterics, archaeologists, astronomers, and those with a general interest in history took part.

Between 1991 and 1998, archaeological excavations of the site were conducted by archaeologists of the University of La Laguna. Preliminary findings were presented at a colloquium in 1996, providing evidence for the dating of the pyramids. According to the preceding geophysical Georadar-Survey eight locations adjacent to the pyramids, each with an area of 25 m^{2}, were investigated in layers down to the solid lava-floor. In doing so it was possible to establish three specific sediment layers. Starting from the top these were:

1. A layer of thickness averaging 20 cm, consisting of humus-rich earth with many plant remains and roots; tracks from ploughing were clearly identifiable as were a broad spectrum of readily datable finds from the second half of the 20th century.
2. A layer of thickness averaging 25 cm, similar in composition to the first layer, however containing less humus and a larger amount of small stones; a large variety of finds which could be dated to the 19th and 20th century were found, of which an official seal from 1848 deserves particular mention.
3. A layer of thickness between 25 and 150 cm, composed out of small volcanic rocks, most likely put in place in one movement, which levelled the uneven stone underneath; the stones contained only very few finds, mostly a small number of pottery shards, of which some was local and some imported, both kinds were roughly estimated as belonging to the 19th century. The pyramids stand stratigraphically directly on top of this bottom layer, therefore allowing for an earliest date of construction of the pyramids within the 19th century.

Furthermore, under the border edge of one of the pyramids, a natural lava cave was discovered. It had been walled up and yielded artefacts from the time of the Guanches. Since the pyramids lie stratigraphically above the cave, the Guanche finds from between 600 and 1000 AD can only support conclusions on the date of human use of the cave. The above survey indicates that the pyramids themselves cannot be older than the 19th century.

== Maldives ==
Heyerdahl also investigated the so-called Havitta-mounds found on the Maldive Islands in the Indian Ocean. These are generally dated to the Buddhist period, but Heyerdahl declared that he found the remains of earlier structures underneath them. There, he found sun-orientated foundations and courtyards, as well as statues with elongated earlobes. Heyerdahl believed that these finds fit with his theory of a seafaring civilization which originated in what is now Sri Lanka, colonized the Maldives, and influenced or founded the cultures of ancient South America and Easter Island. His discoveries are detailed in his book The Maldive Mystery.

== Other projects ==
Heyerdahl was active in Green politics and received numerous awards, including 11 honorary doctorates from universities in the Americas and Europe.

In subsequent years, Heyerdahl was involved with other expeditions and archaeological projects. He remained best known for his boatbuilding, and for his emphasis on cultural diffusionism.

== Heyerdahl and racism ==
Historian Axel Andersson wrote that "Unfortunately Heyerdahl was almost never challenged when it came to the racism of his theories, neither at the time of the Kon-Tiki nor, surprisingly, at any time later. ... The racism in the Kon-Tiki theory that was so clearly articulated by Heyerdahl became invisible with a disturbing ease. That it also remained equally uncommented on throughout the second half of the twentieth century shows the stubborn persistency of racial theories. Now the time has come not to dismiss Heyerdahl as a racist but to uncover the sooty kernel at the heart of Heyerdahl's fantasy, and our fantasy of Heyerdahl."

Graham Holton of the Institute of Latin American Studies wrote that "The core of the Kontiki theory is that a white race came from the Middle East to the Americas and then on to Polynesia to teach the dark-skinned people the arts of civilisation" (Heyerdahl 1952). Edward Norbeck attacked the book for Heyerdahl's assumptions, and asserted that it was 'difficult for many persons to avoid reading racism from this work' (quoted in Wauchope 1962, 120). Throughout the text, Heyerdahl uses concepts such as 'racial hygiene', 'racial cleansing', and 'race wars'. Heyerdahl's theory holds that a blond/red-haired, blue-eyed, dynastic 'race' of masons and miners migrated around the world civilising the dark-skinned 'races'.

== Death ==
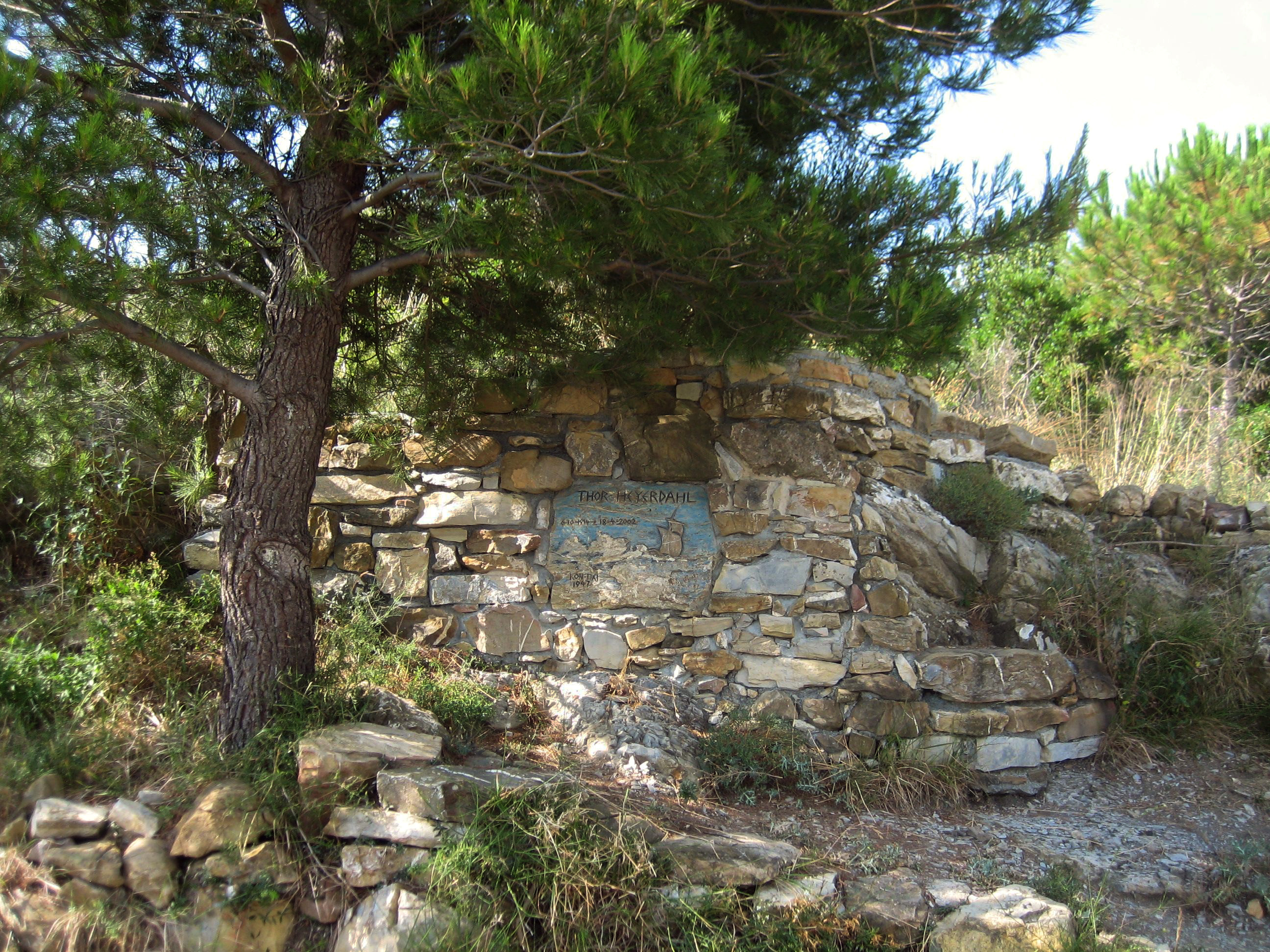
Thor Heyerdahl's tomb at Colla Micheri

Heyerdahl died on 18 April 2002 aged 87 from a brain tumor in Colla Micheri, Liguria, at his family's retreat. After receiving the diagnosis, he prepared for death, by refusing to eat or take medication.

The Norwegian government honored him with a state funeral in the Oslo Cathedral on 26 April 2002. Until 2024, he was buried in the garden of the family home in Colla Micheri. In 2024, his urn was moved to a new grave in the graveyard of Larvik Church, the same church he was baptized in. He was an atheist.

== Legacy ==
Although much of his work was not accepted by the scientific community for many years, Heyerdahl nevertheless increased public interest in ancient history and anthropology. He also showed that long-distance ocean voyages were possible with ancient designs. As such, he was a major practitioner of experimental archaeology. The Kon-Tiki Museum on the Bygdøy peninsula in Oslo, Norway houses vessels and maps from the Kon-Tiki expedition, as well as a library with about 8,000 books.

The Thor Heyerdahl Institute was established in 2000. Heyerdahl himself agreed to the founding of the institute and its aims to promote and continue to develop Heyerdahl's ideas and principles. The institute is located in Heyerdahl's birth town of Larvik, Norway. In Larvik, the birthplace of Heyerdahl, the municipality began a project in 2007 to attract more visitors. Since then, they have purchased and renovated Heyerdahl's childhood home, arranged a yearly raft regatta in his honour at the end of summer and begun to develop a Heyerdahl centre.

Heyerdahl's grandson, Olav Heyerdahl, retraced his grandfather's Kon-Tiki voyage in 2006 as part of a six-member crew. The voyage, organised by Torgeir Higraff and called the Tangaroa Expedition, was intended as a tribute to Heyerdahl, an effort to better understand navigation via centreboards ("guara") as well as a means to monitor the Pacific Ocean's environment.

A book about the Tangaroa Expedition by Torgeir Higraff was published in 2007. The book has numerous photos from the Kon-Tiki voyage 60 years earlier and is illustrated with photographs by Tangaroa crew member Anders Berg (Oslo: Bazar Forlag, 2007). "Tangaroa Expedition" has also been produced as a documentary DVD in English, Norwegian, Swedish and Spanish.

== Decorations and honorary degrees ==
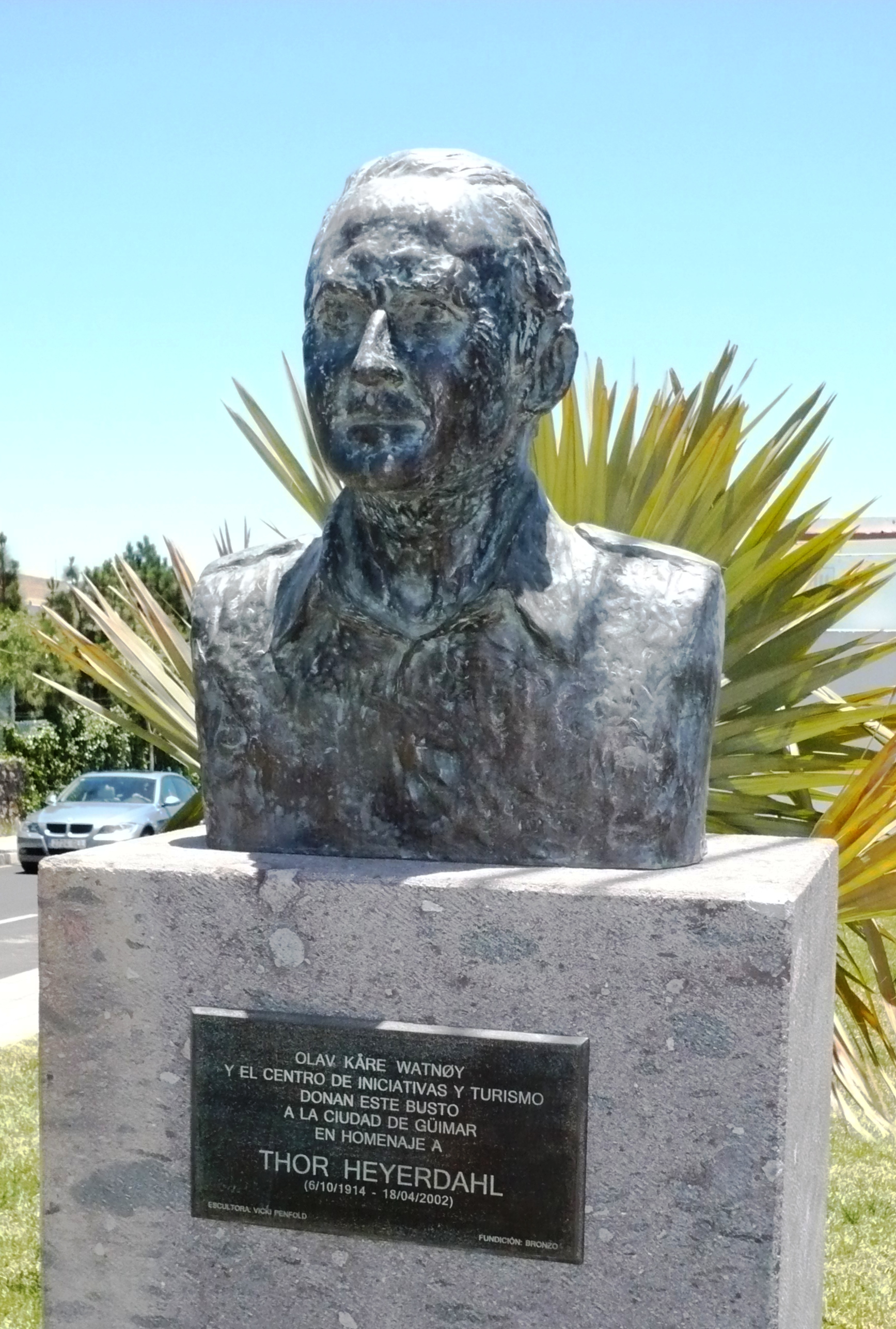
Bust of Thor Heyerdahl. Güímar, Tenerife.

Asteroid 2473 Heyerdahl is named after him, as are HNoMS Thor Heyerdahl, a Norwegian Nansen class frigate, along with MS Thor Heyerdahl (now renamed MS Vana Tallinn), and Thor Heyerdahl, a German three-masted sail training vessel originally owned by a participant of the Tigris expedition. Heyerdahl Vallis, a valley on Pluto, and Thor Heyerdahl Upper Secondary School in Larvik, the town of his birth, are also named after him. Google honoured Heyerdahl on his 100th birthday by making a Google Doodle.

Heyerdahl's numerous awards and honours include the following:

=== Governmental and state honours ===
- Grand Cross of the Royal Norwegian Order of St Olav (1987) (Commander with Star: 1970; Commander: 1951)
- Grand Cross of the Order of Merit of Peru (1953)
- Grand Officer of the Order of Merit of the Italian Republic (21 June 1965)
- Knight in the Order of Saint John of Jerusalem
- Knight of the Order of Merit, Egypt (1971)
- Grand Officer of the Order of Ouissam Alaouite (Morocco; 1971)
- Officer, Order of the Sun (Peru) (1975) and Knight Grand Cross
- International Pahlavi Environment Prize, United Nations (1978)
- Knight of the Order of the Golden Ark, Netherlands (1980)
- Commander, American Knights of Malta (1970)
- Civitan International World Citizenship Award
- Austrian Decoration for Science and Art (2000)
- St. Hallvard's Medal

=== Academic honours ===
- Retzius Medal, Royal Swedish Society for Anthropology and Geography (1950)
- Mungo Park Medal, Royal Scottish Society for Geography (1951)
- Bonaparte-Wyse Gold Medal, Société de Géographie de Paris (1951)
- Elisha Kent Kane Gold Medal, Geographical Society of Philadelphia (1952)
- Honorary Member, Geographical Societies of Norway (1953), Peru (1953), Brazil (1954)
- Elected Member Norwegian Academy of Sciences (1958)
- Fellow, New York Academy of Sciences (1960)
- Vega Gold Medal, Swedish Society for Anthropology and Geography (1962)
- Lomonosov Medal, Moscow State University (1962)
- Gold Medal, Royal Geographical Society, London (1964)
- Distinguished Service Award, Pacific Lutheran University, Tacoma, Washington, US (1966)
- Member American Anthropological Association (1966)
- Kiril i Metodi Award, Geographical Society, Bulgaria (1972)
- Honorary Professor, Instituto Politécnico Nacional, Mexico (1972)
- Bradford Washburn Award, Museum of Science, Boston, US, (1982)
- President's Medal, Pacific Lutheran University, Tacoma, US (1996)
- Honorary Professorship, Western University, Baku, Azerbaijan (1999)

=== Honorary degrees ===
- Doctor Honoris Causa, University of Oslo, Norway (1961)
- Doctor Honoris Causa, USSR Academy of Science (1980)
- Doctor Honoris Causa, University of San Martin, Lima, Peru, (1991)
- Doctor Honoris Causa, University of Havana, Cuba (1992)
- Doctor Honoris Causa, University of Kyiv, Ukraine (1993)
- Doctor Honoris Causa, University of Maine, Orono (1998)

== Publications ==
- På Jakt efter Paradiset (Hunt for Paradise), 1938; Fatu-Hiva: Back to Nature (changed title in English in 1974).
- The Kon-Tiki Expedition: By Raft Across the South Seas (Kon-Tiki ekspedisjonen, also known as Kon-Tiki: Across the Pacific in a Raft), 1948.
- American Indians in the Pacific: The Theory Behind the Kon-Tiki Expedition (Chicago: Rand McNally, 1952), 821 pages.
- Aku-Aku: The Secret of Easter Island, 1957.
- Archaeology of Easter Island, vol. 1 (London: George Allen and Unwin, 1961), vol. 2 (1965)
- Sea Routes to Polynesia: American Indians and Early Asiatics in the Pacific (Chicago: Rand McNally, 1968), 232 pages.
- The Ra Expeditions ISBN 0-14-003462-5.
- Early Man and the Ocean: The Beginning of Navigation and Seaborn Civilizations, 1979
- The Tigris Expedition: In Search of Our Beginnings
- The Maldive Mystery, 1986
- Green Was the Earth on the Seventh Day: Memories and Journeys of a Lifetime
- Pyramids of Tucume: The Quest for Peru's Forgotten City
- Skjebnemøte vest for havet [Fate Meets West of the Ocean], 1992 (in Norwegian and German only) the Native Americans tell their story, white and bearded Gods, infrastructure was not built by the Inkas but their more advanced predecessors.
- In the Footsteps of Adam: A Memoir (the official edition is Abacus, 2001, translated by Ingrid Christophersen) ISBN 0-349-11273-8
- Ingen Grenser (No Boundaries, Norwegian only), 1999
- Jakten på Odin (Theories about Odin, Norwegian only), 2001

== See also ==
- M/S Thor Heyerdahl – a ferry named after him
- List of notable brain tumor patients
- Pre-Columbian trans-oceanic contact
- Pre-Columbian rafts
- Vital Alsar
- Kitín Muñoz
- The Viracocha expedition
