= Aku-Aku =

Book by Thor Heyerdahl

First edition (Norwegian)

Aku-Aku: the Secret of Easter Island is a 1957 book by Thor Heyerdahl published in Norwegian, Swedish, Danish and Finnish, and in French and English the following year. The book describes the 1955–1956 Norwegian Archaeological Expedition's investigations of Polynesian history and culture at Easter Island, the Austral Islands of Rapa Iti and Raivavae, and the Marquesas Islands of Nuku Hiva and Hiva Oa. Visits to Pitcairn Island, Mangareva and Tahiti are described as well.

By far the greatest part of the book tells of the work on Easter Island, where the expedition investigated the giant stone statues (moai), the quarries at Rano Raraku and Puna Pau, the ceremonial village of Orongo on Rano Kau, as well as many other sites throughout the island. Much of the book's interest derives from the interaction of the expedition staff, from their base at Anakena beach, with the Easter Islanders themselves, who lived mainly in the village of Hanga Roa.

The book and a follow-up film of the same name made a major contribution to general public awareness of both the island and the statues.

== Reception ==
The book was widely distributed, with both hardcover and mass market editions published, as well as several reprint editions.

Some of Heyerdahl's conclusions have been questioned by archaeologists, plus his methods of selecting evidence to confirm his point of view. Notable is his professionalism in the fieldwork, as he used educated archaeologists.

== Theories ==
Heyerdahl is mostly associated with an attempt to revive the theory that some of the islanders' stone-carving technology is almost identical to the one in some parts of South America, notably Peru. He argued that in addition to having been settled by Polynesians, Easter Island was settled by people from Peru in South America (an area he described as being "more culturally developed").

The Easter Islanders, according to Heyerdahl, insisted that the moai (statues) of Easter Island moved into their positions by "walking." Heyerdahl theorised that this referred to a statue having been moved in an upright orientation, by the technique of swiveling it alternatively on its corners in a "walking" fashion, a technique that can be used in moving a tall, flat-bottomed object (like a free-standing closet). He tested this theory on a small moai; however, he quickly abandoned the test after the moai's base was damaged. He worked with a group of inhabitants to demonstrate pulling a rather large statue lying down (which was easy to do), thus showing that this method was useful. He also worked with the natives to erect a statue using levers and stones, demonstrating that this method also worked. At this time all statues were either partially buried or lying down, and this one was the first to be restored.

Heyerdahl compared the highest-quality stonework on the island (present in very few cases) to pre-Columbian Amerindian stonework, such as at Tihuanaco. He said of Ahu Vinapu's retaining wall, "No Polynesian fisherman would have been capable of conceiving, much less building such a wall".

Heyerdahl claimed a South American origin for a number of Easter Island plants, including the Totora reeds in the island's three crater lakes. These are now (by DNA analysis not available at the time) recognised as a separate species from similar ones in Lake Titicaca. He made the same claim for sweet potato and this fact remains unexplained, since this is indeed South American.

A cultural feature on Easter Island was the enlongation of the earlobe. This is not present in Polynesia but common in South America. On the other hand, weaving and pottery (used in the Americas) were not known to the inhabitants of Easter Island.

=== Modern Analysis ===
Many decades after the hypotheses put forth in the book were proposed, modern DNA analysis has been used to examine Heyerdahl's hypothesis of a South American origin for some of the Easter Island inhabitants. DNA sequence analysis of Easter Island's current inhabitants indicates that the 36 people living on Rapa Nui who survived the devastating internecine wars, slave raids and epidemics of the 19th century and had any offspring, were Polynesian. Furthermore, examination of skeletons offers evidence of only Polynesian origins for Rapa Nui living on the island after 1680.
