= Norman Baker (explorer) =

American sailor (1928–2017)

- Born: Norman Leonard Baker; November 18, 1928
- Died: November 22, 2017 (aged 89); Pittsford, Vermont, U.S.
- Education: Cornell University
- Occupation: Navigator

Norman Leonard Baker (November 18, 1928 – November 22, 2017) was a navigator on Thor Heyerdahl's Ra, Ra II and Tigris reed boat expeditions. He was the co-author (with Barbara Murphy) of Thor Heyerdahl and the Reed Boat Ra, a 1974 children's book on the expeditions. He was a fellow and director of the Explorers Club, and served as an advisor to Fara Heim, an expedition searching for signs of Viking settlements in North America. Baker died when the Cessna 172 he was piloting crashed in Pittsford, Vermont on November 22, 2017.

== See also ==
- Ra, a 1972 documentary film
- 95-foot schooner, the Anne Kristine.
