= Robert Carl Suggs =

American archaeologist and anthropologist (1932–2021)

Robert Carl Suggs (February 24, 1932 – April 17, 2021) was an American archaeologist and anthropologist. He was a student of Harry L. Shapiro at the American Museum of Natural History in the 1950s and received his M.A. from Columbia University in 1956 and his Ph.D. from Columbia in 1959.

Suggs is best known for his work on Nuku Hiva in the Marquesas Islands. He also was noted for his refutation of the theory of Thor Heyerdahl, who had speculated that Polynesia was possibly settled from South America, rather than the prevailing belief that the area was settled from west to east, that is, from Asia. Dr. Suggs has a chapter entitled "The Kon-Tiki Myth" in his book, The Island Civilizations of Polynesia (1960), that states, "The Kon-Tiki theory is about as plausible as the tales of Atlantis, Mu, and 'Children of the Sun.' Like most such theories, it makes exciting light reading, but as an example of scientific method it fares quite poorly." [1] He authored 48 works that have been published in 10 languages.[2] He also was employed by several private corporations, including the Martin Co. and Dunlap and Associates, in the 1960s when he conducted studies into nuclear fallout shelters and habitats for the space program. [3] Books by Dr. Suggs appeal to both a specialized audience in anthropology and the general public. [3] For many years in his retirement, he led private tours and was a speaker on the cruise ship Aranui 3.

== Selected writings ==
- The Island Civilizations of Polynesia, New American Library (1960)
- The Hidden Worlds of Polynesia; The Chronicle of an Archaeological Expedition to Nuku Hiva in the Marquesas Islands, Harcourt-Brace (1962)
- Marquesan Sexual Behavior: An Anthropological Study of Polynesian Practices, Harcourt-Brace (1966)
- Manuiota'a: Journal of a Voyage to the Marquesas Islands, with Burgl Lichtenstein, Pa'eke Press (2001) ISBN 1-887747-38-9
