= The Kon-Tiki Expedition =

1948 book by Thor Heyerdahl

The Kon-Tiki Expedition: By Raft Across the South Seas
- First edition (Norwegian)
- Author: Thor Heyerdahl
- Original title: Kon-Tiki Ekspedisjonen
- Language: Norwegian
- Publisher: Gyldendal Norsk Forlag; George Allen & Unwin (UK)
- Publication date: 1948
- Publication place: Norway
- English publication date: 1950
- Pages: 235

The Kon-Tiki Expedition: By Raft Across the South Seas (Norwegian: Kon-Tiki ekspedisjonen) is a 1948 book by the Norwegian writer Thor Heyerdahl. It recounts Heyerdahl's experiences with the Kon-Tiki expedition, where he travelled across the Pacific Ocean on a balsa tree raft. The book was first published in Norway on 2 November 1948, and sold out in 15 days. By 1961, the book had been translated into at least 55 languages. According to a 2013 movie about the expedition the book had been translated into more than 70 languages and sold more than 50 million copies.
