= Acali =

1973 social experiment

The Acali expedition (or Acali experiment, informally referred to as the "Sex Raft") was a 1973 social experiment that aimed to investigate interpersonal relationships in conditions of limited space and social isolation. The experiment was organized by Mexican anthropologist Santiago Genovés, who sought to prove that humans would ultimately turn to violence and aggression as part of human nature, especially in sexual conflicts, and deliberately engineered the experiment to encourage aggression and tension.

Eleven participants—five men, including Genovés himself, and six women, a deliberate gender imbalance—embarked on a lengthy trip on a custom-built raft, the Acali, from Spain to Mexico across the Atlantic Ocean. However, during the experiment the participants were peaceful and cooperative, prompting Genovés to attempt to create conflict himself to prove his own theory.

The raft left Las Palmas in the Canary Islands on 12 May 1973, and took 101 days to drift across the Atlantic Ocean and reach Cozumel, Mexico, with a single stopover in Barbados. The Acali was dubbed the "Sex Raft" by news media, which heavily reported on supposedly rampant sexual activities among the participants since the start of the expedition, which was untrue.

== Background ==
Santiago Genovés was a social researcher studying aggression, violence, and friction in humans. Based on observed behaviors among male and female primates, Genovés believed that in crisis situations humans would show their "true behavior", which was more instinctual, animalistic, and aggressive, and that this was especially true regarding conflicts between men over sexual access to a limited number of women. After experiencing a hijacking in November 1972, when a plane he was on was forcibly diverted to Cuba, Genovés observed that the crisis brought out the "authentic selves" of the passengers and crew, with them exhibiting behaviors that were markedly different from the behaviors and roles they assumed before and after the crisis, when their lives were not in inescapable duress. This inspired him to devise a situation where a group of people would be isolated from the rest of the world and forced to deal with internal and external crises they could not simply flee from. Genovés hoped that the experiment would achieve a breakthrough in studies of violent behavior and help achieve world peace.

Genovés was experienced in long-distance rafting and had previously been an earlier participant on the Ra and Ra II expeditions in 1969 and 1970, respectively. These were Thor Heyerdahl's ethnohistorical attempts to prove that prehistoric civilizations could have crossed the Atlantic by means of papyrus-constructed boats. Genovés was intrigued by the incidents of friction that he had witnessed during these expeditions, and he believed further studies of human behaviour under stressful conditions were justified in this regard.

The experiment was sponsored by the National Autonomous University of Mexico (UNAM) and Mexican television station Channel 13. The participants had to sign a document in which they voluntarily agreed to be part of the experiment and undergo the different studies. In it, Genovés, as director general of the experiment, was authorized for the use of the material collected by the studies. The document also released the sponsors from any responsibility in the event of injury or death. The participants underwent various medical and psychiatric examinations before the expedition, as well as psychological and graphological tests. Genovés hoped to use this data to predict how the participants would interact with each other.

Participants had to fill out periodic questionnaires during the trip about their personal relationships with the other participants, their mood, their perception of the experiment, their behavior, and other aspects. There were 46 questionnaire periods over the course of the expedition, with most questionnaires being previously designed, though some were conducted ad hoc. Researchers such as anthropologists, psychologists, and sociologists studied the contents of the questionnaires and what they said about the participants and others. Genovés's personal notes were also studied, making up 1,042 pages.

== Acali ==
The name of the raft, Acali, comes from the Nahuatl language and means "the house on the water". The raft was built specifically for the experiment. It had a steel hull painted white and international orange, and it was 12 metres in length with 7 metres beam and 2 metres in depth. The cabin measured 4 × 4 metres. It was designed by José Antonio Mandri and Colin Mudie, and was built in Newcastle upon Tyne, England. Owing to Genovés's experiences on the Ra expedition, during which the Ra vessel sunk after 54 days, the Acali was designed to be "virtually unsinkable", allowing it to serve as more of a platform for the experiment.

The Acali was deliberately designed to be incredibly uncomfortable and have little to no privacy, with the only shelter being the cabin in the centre and the space below deck, which were short enough to preclude standing upright. The raft's toilet was an open-air hole that was deliberately placed in an exposed location, with only the ocean water as a means of washing. No other vessels followed the Acali, and it had no motor, with no way of turning back.

== Participants ==
Name	Age	Gender	Nationality	Role
Santiago Genovés Tarazaga	49	male	(Francoist Spain) (Mexico) Spanish-Mexican	Anthropologist, devised the experiment
José María Montero Pérez	34	male	Uruguay	Anthropologist, former student of Genovés
Servane Zanotti	32	female	(France) French	Scuba diver, responsible for conducting a study on pollution
Charles Antoni	37	male	(Cyprus) Cypriot	Radio operator
Rachida Mazani	23	female	(Algeria) Algerian	Responsible for conducting a study on pollution
Mary Gidley	36	female	(United States) American	Some knowledge of navigation
Fé Evangelina Seymour	23	female	(United States) American	Radio operator
Maria Björnstam	30	female	(Sweden) Swedish	Captain of the expedition
Edna Jonas	32	female	(Czechoslovakia) Czechoslovak resident in Israel	Doctor
Bernardo Bongo	29	male	(Portuguese Angola) Angolan	Priest
Eisuke Yamaki	29	male	(Japan) Japanese	Cameraman

To create a microcosm of society, Genovése placed advertisements for the experiment in international newspapers to draw in applicants from across the world. The participants were chosen based on following criteria:

1. married and parents, or involved in a relationship—that is, people who had something to lose, who were not coming to find adventure or fame;

2. of a distinct nationality;

3. as a group, able to meet the requirements of the raft. That is, a sailor, a doctor, a radio operator, a frogman, a photographer, an expert in sea pollution, etc.

Genovés selected people he had judged to be physically attractive to increase sexual tension (unlike the all-male Ra expeditions). He also tried to exploit differences in backgrounds by selecting people from opposing groups based on stereotypes and ongoing world tensions, such as a white American and a black American, and an Arab and an Israeli. They were picked regardless of language proficiencies, to introduce a language barrier among the participants that could be exploited.

The ten participants each took on roles in the Acali's crew. Captain Maria Björnstam was the only professional sailor on board. Reflecting gender equality movements in 1970s society, Genovés assigned the important roles in the raft to the women, with the men being assigned supporting roles and menial tasks, to test whether having women in power would increase or decrease hostility among the participants; he expected that at some point, the men would feel emasculated and attempt to seize control from the women.

== Expedition ==
At the very beginning of the expedition, Björnstam's boyfriend told her that the contract she had been asked to sign was essentially a "slave contract", and demanded she choose between him and the expedition. Björnstam chose to remain on the expedition, though she emphasized she did not sign the contract.

The Acali set off from Las Palmas on 12 May 1973, westbound toward the Caribbean. Every two days the Acali would receive a weather report, and once a week it would send out a report about its status and the situation on board. The participants were sent a weekly questionnaire, with questions pertaining to relations with other participants, likes and dislikes, and sexual activity; they were also required to complete a weekly graphology test that consisted of drawing a tree. During the expedition, Genovés recorded notes on the mental and physiological states of each participant, including menstrual periods, and compared it with external factors such as the weather, the temperature, and the phase of the moon, among others.

The participants were not allowed to have reading materials, so instead they entertained themselves by socializing, singing songs, and sharing stories. Some participants had sex or masturbated, but the lack of privacy in the Acali's design meant that either it would occur in full view of the other participants (the sleeping quarters being compact and alternating male-female meant it would be right next to the others as well), or it would have to be done quietly and quickly at night; even then, there was always a helmsman and lookout in shifts, meaning that no matter what there would still be observers, or they would need to be quick to maintain control over the raft.

Early on, the participants caught a small shark, which they pulled aboard, creating a "crowd frenzy" as they bludgeoned the shark to death with an axe. This made Genovés believe their primitive, violent instincts had awoken, as he theorized, and he considered it a breakthrough. However, roughly halfway through the expedition, Genovés realized that the participants were not exhibiting violent behavior, and the questionnaires were not leading anywhere. Sexual activity had also declined quickly and remained low, interfering with the premise of conflicts fomented by sexual causes.

Frustrated by the fruitless direction of the experiment, Genovés initiated a "Truth Game" where he stated that the participants were getting too comfortable with each other and began reading the answers of questionnaires out loud to provoke reactions, hoping that by revealing what everyone confidentially thought about each other, he would inflame tensions to create more material to study. Genovés also tried more direct attempts to spark conflict, including instances where he threw a bucket of water on one of the participants, called another a "primitive, lazy thief", and gossiped to participants about remarks others had supposedly made about them.

When the Acali's rudder broke, Zanotti, the scuba diver, was tasked with conducting the repairs, but Genovés explained that he could not risk sending a woman, and insisted on doing the task himself. Zanotti helped him prepare, but during the dive Genovés almost drowned, forcing Zannoti to conduct the repairs herself the next morning before he woke up. This angered Genovés when he found out, and the participants noticed that despite acting progressive and encouraging having women in power, Genovés took issue with letting women perform any important tasks during crises, even though that was one point of the expedition that he himself had planned.

Later, the Acali was alerted to an incoming Caribbean hurricane. Unbeknownst to them, Genovés was already aware of this, and had in fact scheduled the expedition to ensure they would cross paths with the hurricane, as he believed the introduction of a dangerous situation would make them "act on their instincts". Björnstam, as the captain, sought to dock the Acali at a port for the participants' safety. However, Genovés insisted that doing so would "contaminate" the experiment and that they should "continue no matter what", "for the sake of science". Björnstam stated she could not take that responsibility as a captain, prompting Genovés to relieve her of her role and appoint himself as the captain. He ordered everyone to prepare for the storm, using only the cabin as shelter. The hurricane missed them, allowing the expedition to continue. Björnstam later regarded the incident as Genovés committing mutiny.

Genovés did not perform well as the Acali's captain. When the raft unexpectedly entered a collision course with a container ship or oil tanker that did not see them, he panicked, forcing Björnstam to reassume command and order the crew to signal the ship using flares. The ship diverted course, preventing a collision, and the other participants regarded Björnstam as the Acali's captain again.

Genovés's reckless and endangering behavior became such an issue that the participants held a secret meeting in which they agreed he was a threat to their survival and seriously considered killing him and framing his death as an "accident". Propositions included forcing him overboard, injecting him with a lethal overdose of medication, or having all ten of them take turns stabbing him with a knife so they could all share complicity. However, they ultimately decided against doing so. Ironically, this was the only time they considered harming anyone in the experiment, despite Genovés's expectation that violence would break out among the participants.

After being removed from his role as captain, Genovés realized that he was the only one aboard who had shown any aggression so far on the expedition. He stopped doing questionnaires, writing notes, and giving orders, and instead he retreated below deck, withdrew from the others, and fell ill. Over the raft's radio, Genovés learned that UNAM was embarrassed by the news media's coverage of the Acali as the "Sex Raft" due to reports suggesting the participants were all having sex, and that his fellow researchers were considering withdrawing their support, making him cry for the first time since his childhood. The other participants, who became a closely-tied group, doubted whether he was actually sick and depressed, given his prior attempts to manipulate those aboard, but some later gained respect for his humility.

After a brief stop in Barbados, the Acali successfully arrived in Cozumel with all participants safe and accounted for. They were placed into isolation and studied and examined by researchers for a week afterward before being released.

== Aftermath ==
Most of the participants considered the Acali experiment to be a success. Genovés concluded that while people would behave more naturally under stressful conditions, and the strive for power and control was a point of tension, intended stressors such as the hostile design of the cramped raft, vast demographic differences between the participants, gender imbalances, sexual intimacy, and external crises such as the hurricane and container ship, had little impact on the relationships between the participants, who did not break out into conflict as expected.

While Genovés's hypothesis had been largely incorrect, he had made conclusions regarding news media and public opinion: 80% of news coverage regarding the experiment placed significant and undue coverage on sexual activities aboard, despite little actually occurring; even family members and partners of the participants, most of whom were married, believed this as well due to news coverage.

The experiment was the subject of the 2018 documentary film The Raft by Marcus Lindeen.

== See also ==
- Stanford prison experiment
