= Carlo Mauri =

Italian mountaineer and explorer

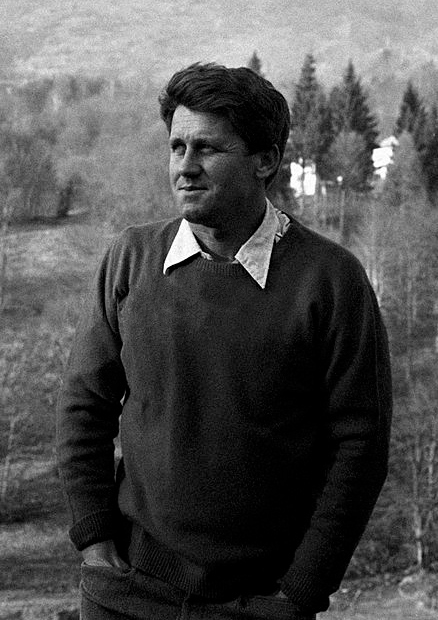
Carlo Mauri in Italy in the 1960s

Carlo Mauri (25 March 1930 – 31 May 1982) was an Italian mountaineer and explorer. Mauri was born in Lecco. Among his early climbs in the Alps two stand out: the first winter ascent of the via Comici route on the northern face of Cima Grande di Lavaredo; and the first solitary ascent of the Poire of Mont Blanc. Numerous expeditions abroad followed. In 1956 he reached the summit of Monte Sarmiento in Tierra del Fuego and in 1958, as a member of Riccardo Cassin’s expedition in Karakorum, he and Walter Bonatti made the first ascent of Gasherbrum IV (7,925 m).

In 1969, and again in 1970, he was a member of Thor Heyerdahl's expedition which crossed the Atlantic Ocean in Ra I and Ra II, vessels made of papyrus. Following the Ra expeditions, Mauri took part in many others including following the route of Marco Polo in the Asian steppes and exploring Patagonia and the Amazon. He also made several documentary films of his travels, some of them produced for the Italian state broadcaster RAI. Again with Heyerdahl he took part in the Tigris expedition of 1977. He was a member of the “Gruppo Ragni Grignetta di Lecco” climbers group. After an accident where he suffered a broken leg, Mauri became the first Italian to undergo Gavril Ilizarov's bone-lengthening operation, distraction osteogenesis. He died at Lecco in 1982.
