= Brave Christian Schools =

Coordinates: 37°42′6.82″N 121°57′6.51″W

Location
- 7500 Inspiration Drive; Dublin, California 94568; United States

Information
- Type: Private
- Motto: "Preparing Students to Pursue Their Purpose"
- Established: 1968
- Enrollment: 300-400
- Campus: Suburban
- Color: Red White Black
- Athletics: Soccer; Basketball; Baseball; Flag Football; Volleyball; Track and Field; Softball;
- Mascot: Lions
- Website: bravechristian.org

The Brave Christian Schools (BCS) are private Christian schools located in Dublin, California, US. Brave Christian Schools offers a college preparatory education to students ranging from preschool through twelfth grade. BCS is located 35 miles (56 km) southeast of San Francisco, in the Dublin hills, and resides on a 55-acre (220,000 m^{2}) campus overlooking the Tri-Valley.

== Notable alumni ==
- Nate Boyer- Former National Football League Long Snapper for the Seattle Seahawks
