= Santiago Genovés =

Mexican anthropologist (1923–2013)

- Born: 31 December 1923; Orense, Galicia, Spain
- Died: 5 September 2013 (aged 89)
- Education: National School of Anthropology and History; University of Cambridge
- Known for: "Peace Project" raft experiment
- Awards: Pope John XXIII Memorial International Peace Prize
- Scientific career
- Workplaces: National Autonomous University of Mexico

Santiago Genovés Tarazaga (31 December 1923 – 5 September 2013) was a Spanish-born Mexican anthropologist affiliated with the National Autonomous University of Mexico (UNAM). He is best remembered for the 1973 "Peace Project" experiment that he designed, in which he and ten other people, four men and six women, set out on an expedition on the Acali raft from the Canary Islands to Cozumel. He hoped that the experiment would shed light on the causes of violence in humans and on how it could be prevented, but the participants avoided violence. The 101-day experiment, frequently dubbed the "Sex Raft" by the media, was the subject of the 2018 documentary film The Raft, by Marcus Lindeen. Prior to the "Peace Project", Genovés had been part of the Thor Heyerdahl Ra expedition.

A critique of Genovés's work, especially the 1973 Acali experiment, is that they lacked scientific integrity and value. During the experiment, Genovés became upset by the lack of conflict among the participants and tried to introduce conflict himself, either to produce researchable data or confirm biases, to the point that the other participants considered him a dangerous threat. Genovés later realized that he was the only openly-hostile person aboard the Acali.

His theories which he based the experiment on, regarding an innate violent human nature emerging in crises and especially sexually-driven tensions that could not be withdrawn from, were largely proven wrong by the events of the expedition. He did make observations regarding the news media's coverage of the experiment and its excessive focus on supposedly rampant sexual activities aboard the Acali.

Genovés was one of the researchers who originated, co-authored, and signed the Seville Statement on Violence in 1986.

== Works ==
=== Books ===
- Expedición a la Violencia (ampliación de la declaración sobre la violencia adoptada por la UNESCO.
- Ensayos sobre: Luis Buñuel, Emilio Prados Such, Franz Kafka, George Orwell, Marcel Proust, Pablo Picasso, Alfonso Reyes, Rius.
- El Mar, los Peces y Yo.
- El Pájaro Rojo o El Viaje a Nigeria.
- Solo. Un Hombre en el Mar.
- Balsa de Papyrus, a través del Atlántico.
- ¿Por qué Acali?
- El mono inquisitivo : Convivencia y comportamiento humano.

=== Other publications ===
- (1954) "The problem of sex differences in some fossil hominids, with special reference to the Neandertal remains from Spy". Journal of the Royal Anthropological Institute of Great Britain and Ireland, 84: 131-144.
- (1956) A study of sex differences in the innominate bone (os coxae), with special reference to the material from St. Bride’s Church, London, E. C. I. Universidad de Cambridge, 555 pp, Cambridge.
- (1959) El Oreopithecus en la evolución de los homínidos. Cuadernos del Seminario de Problemas Científicos y Filosóficos 16, Universidad Nacional Autónoma de México, 18 pp, México.
- (1960) "Revaluation of age, stature and sex of the Tepexpan remains, Mexico". American Journal of Physical Anthropology, 18: 205-218.
- (1967) "Proportionality of the long bones and their relation to stature in Mesoamericans". American Journal of Physical Anthropology, 26: 67-78.
- (1975) "El experimento Acali". Revista Médica, 3: 9-31, México.
