= Ark of bulrushes =

Container of the infant Moses

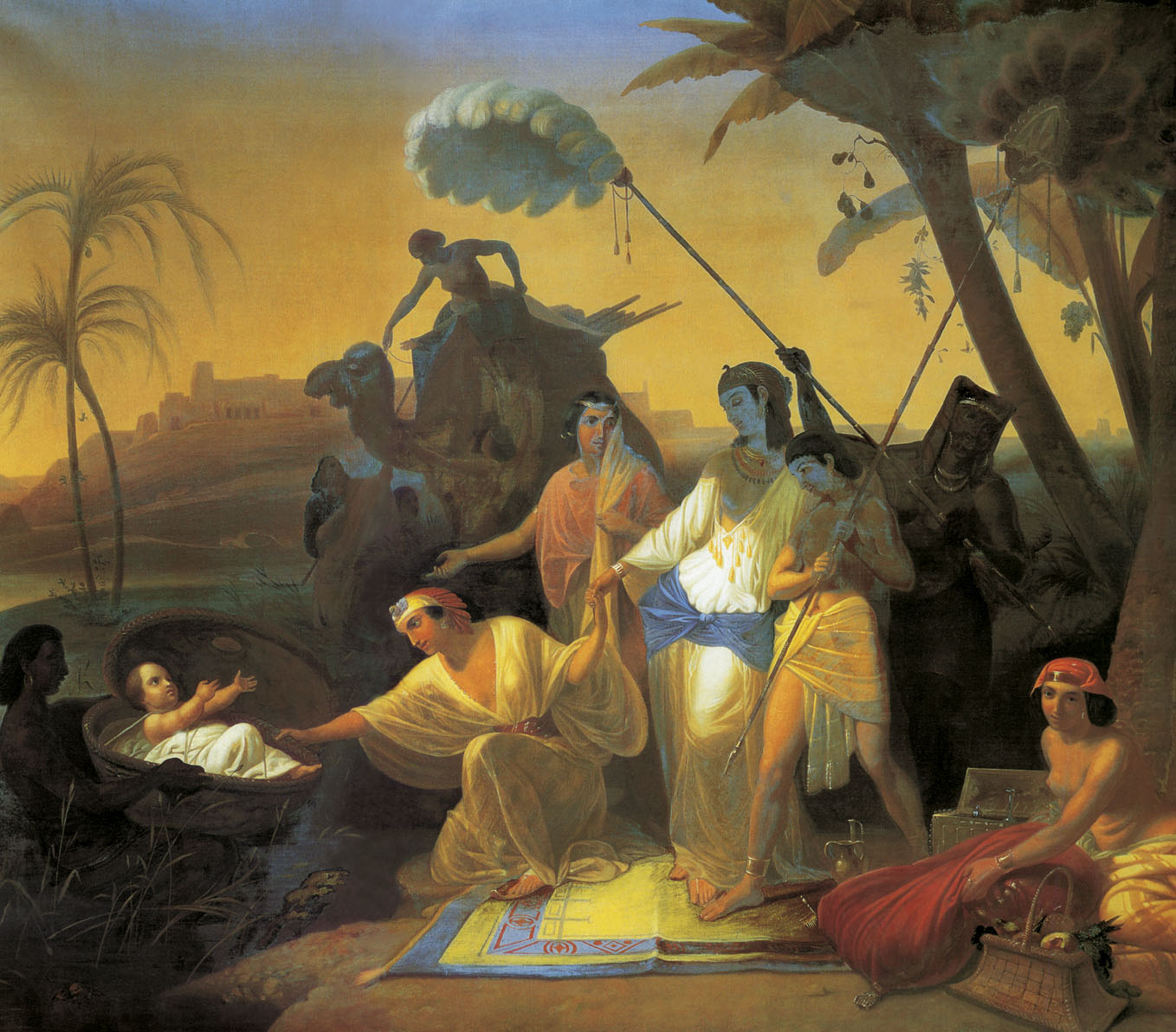
A painting by Konstantin Flavitsky of Pharaoh's daughter finding Moses, who is in a basket.

The ark of bulrushes (Hebrew: תבת גמא, romanized: têḇaṯ gōme) was a container which, according to the episode known as the finding of Moses in the biblical Book of Exodus, carried the infant Moses.

The ark, containing the three-month-old baby Moses, was placed in reeds by the river bank (presumably the Nile) to protect him from the Egyptian mandate to drown every male Hebrew child, and discovered there by Pharaoh's daughter.

== Analysis ==
The ark is described as being daubed with asphalt and pitch, and the English word "ark" is a translation of the Hebrew תֵּבָה (tevah, modern teiva), the same word used for Noah's Ark. According to Jeffrey H. Tigay, the word tevah is probably derived from the Egyptian word tbỉ, which refers to a "box" or "coffin". Irving Finkel also notes similarities between the Biblical Hebrew term and the nearly identical Babylonian word for an oblong boat, ṭubbû.

The "bulrushes" (Hebrew: גֹּ֫מֶא gome) were likely to have been papyrus stalks daubed with bitumen and pitch.

A similar but earlier story is told of Sargon of Akkad.

== See also ==
- Reed boat
- Coracles in India
- Iraqi quffa/kuphar

== Bibliography ==
- Finkel, Irving L. (2014), The Ark Before Noah: Decoding the Story of the Flood, Hodder & Stoughton, ISBN 9781444757071
- Tigay, Jeffrey H. (2023), "Two Notes on the Rescue of Moses in Exodus and in the Dura-Europos Synagogue Mural", in Beiler, Vincent D.; Rubin, Aaron D. (eds.), Linguistic and Philological Studies of the Hebrew Bible and its Manuscripts, BRILL, pp. 307–320, ISBN 978-90-04-54484-0
