= Reed boat =

Boat made from reeds

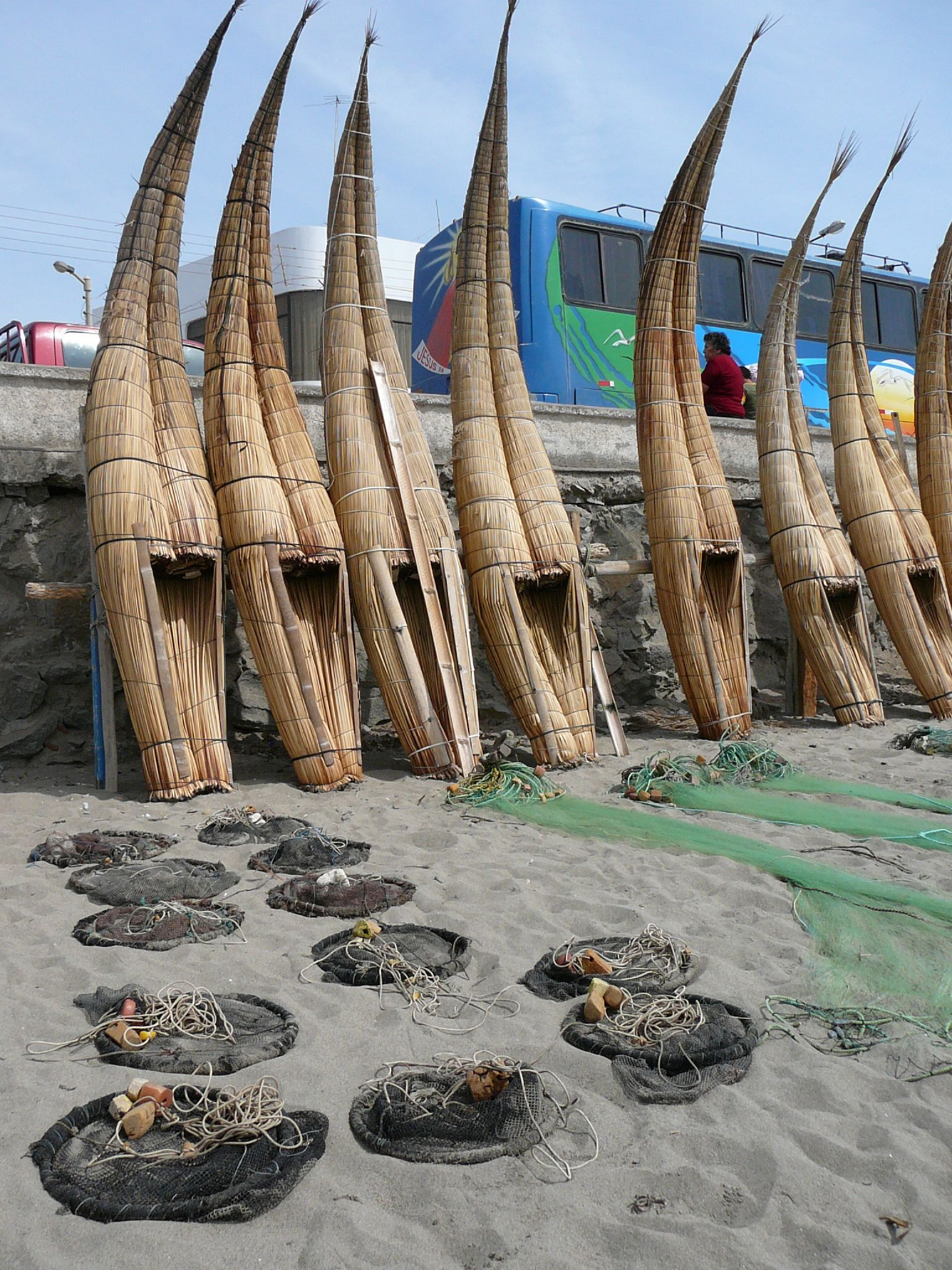
Totora reed fishing boats on the beach at Huanchaco, Peru

Reed boats and rafts, along with dugout canoes and other rafts, are among the oldest known types of boats. Often used as traditional fishing boats, they are still used in a few places around the world, though they have generally been replaced with planked boats. Reed boats can be distinguished from reed rafts, since reed boats are usually waterproofed with some form of tar. As well as boats and rafts, small floating islands have also been constructed from reeds.

The earliest discovered remains from a reed boat are 7000 years old, found in Kuwait. Reed boats are depicted in early petroglyphs and were common in ancient Egypt. A well-known example from the Book of Exodus is the ark of bulrushes in which the baby Moses was set afloat. They were also constructed from early times in Peru and Bolivia, and boats with remarkably similar design have been found in Easter Island and also New Zealand where they were made by indigenous Māori. Reed boats are still used in Peru, Bolivia, Ethiopia, and until recently in Corfu. The explorations and investigations of the Norwegian ethnographer and adventurer Thor Heyerdahl have resulted in a better understanding of the construction and capabilities of reed boats.

== History ==
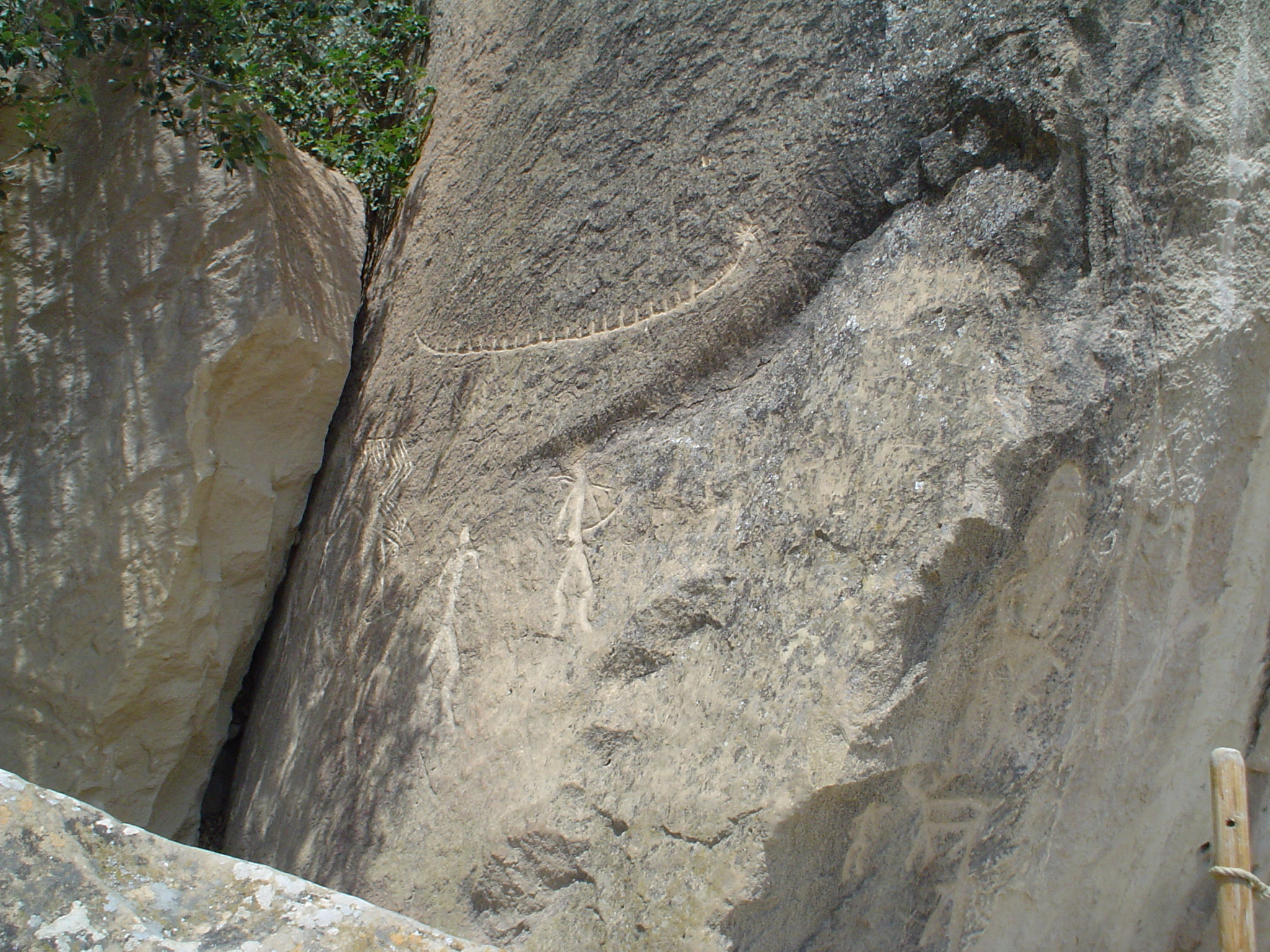
Petroglyphs of a reed boat and men

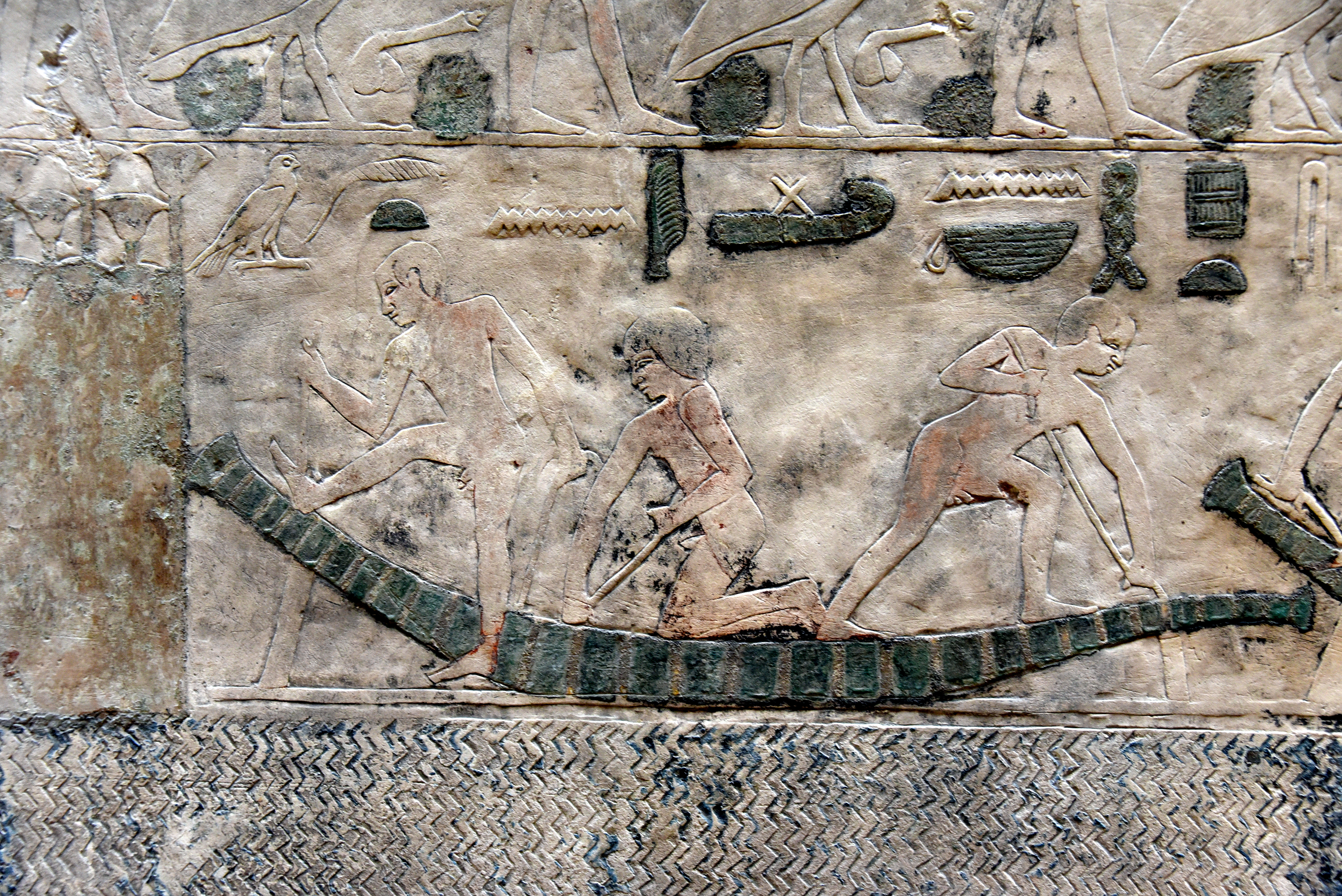
Detail. Fabrication of papyrus boats in ancient Egypt. Wall fragment from the Sun Temple of Nyuserre Ini at Abu Gurob, Egypt. c. 2430 BCE. Neues Museum

The image on the right shows petroglyphs of a reed boat and men. The reed boat is similar to those depicted in cave paintings in Scandinavia, something that led Thor Heyerdahl to theorise that the Scandinavians came from the area that today is Azerbaijan. In the Gobustan Petroglyph Reserve there are more than 6,000 petroglyphs carved by the hunter-gatherers that lived in these caves 12,000 years ago. At that time the Caspian Sea was much higher and washed against the lower rocks of the hill.

Another site is Wadi Hammamat in Qift, Egypt, where there are drawings of Egyptian reed boats dated to 4000 BC

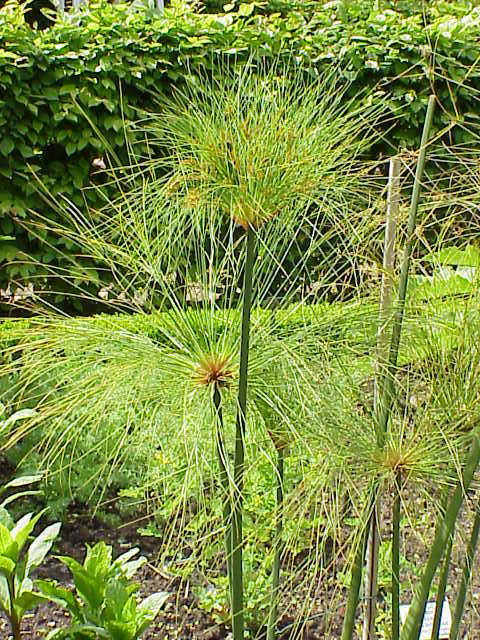
The ancient Egyptian used papyrus reeds to make boats

The oldest known remnants of a boat made with reeds (and tar) are from a 7000-year-old seagoing boat found at the archaeological site of H3, Kuwait.

The ancient Egyptians built boats from papyrus reeds, which were widely cultivated along the Nile River and Delta. This reed was also used for many other purposes, especially for providing papyrus writing parchments. Other reeds of the genus Cyperus may have been used as well. Theophrastus in his History of Plants states that the rigging on King Antigonus' fleet, used to fasten the doors when Ulysses slew the suitors in his hall, was made from papyrus reed. Light skiffs suitable for the navigation of the Nile were constructed with stems cut from papyrus reed, as shown by bas-reliefs from the fourth dynasty where men cut papyrus, and use it to make cordage and sails and to build a reed boat.

According to the Bible, when the Pharaoh issued a decree to kill all the Israelite males, the baby Moses was saved by his mother, who set him adrift on the Nile in an ark of bulrushes. The bulrushes this small boat or basket was built with may have been papyrus. The prophet Isaiah refers to Ethiopian vessels of reed in Isaiah 18:2.

== Thor Heyerdahl ==
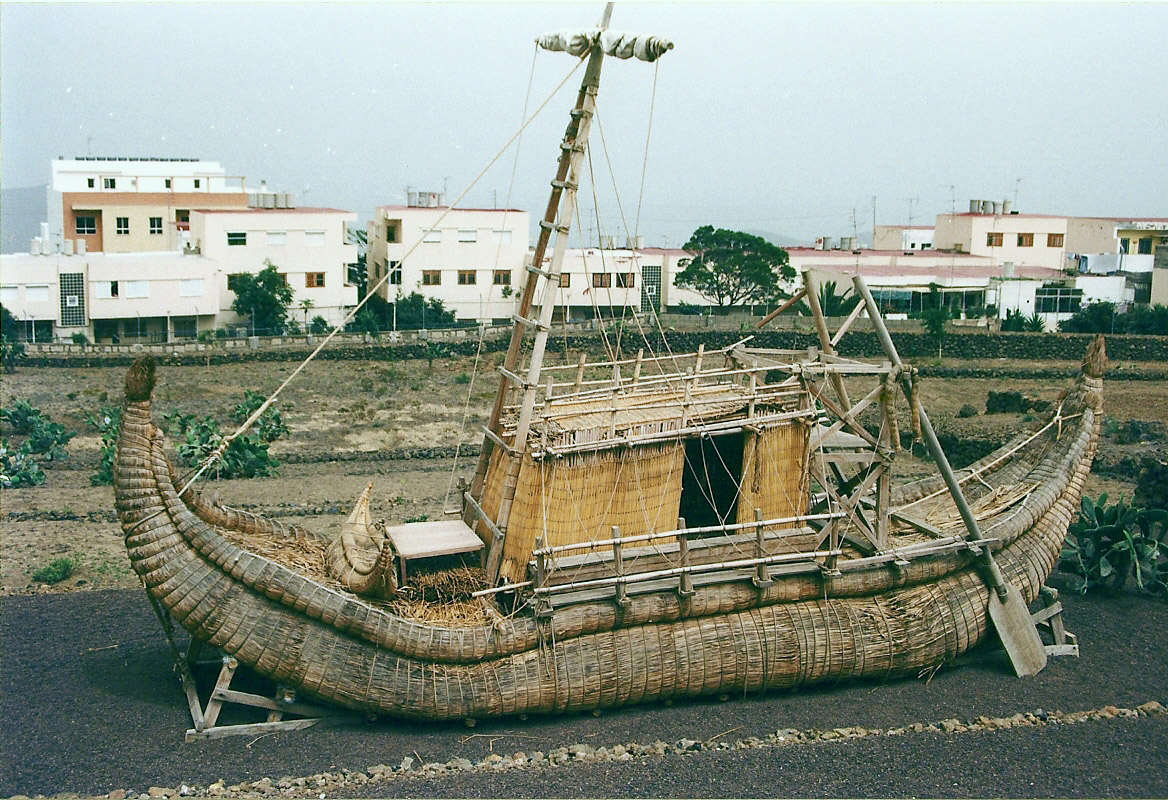
The reed boat Ra II

In more recent years, the explorations and investigations of the Norwegian ethnographer and adventurer Thor Heyerdahl, 1914–2002, have resulted in a better appreciation of the construction and capabilities of reed boats.

Heyerdahl wanted to demonstrate that ancient Mediterranean or African people could have crossed the Atlantic and reached the Americas by sailing with the Canary Current. In 1969, Heyerdahl constructed his first reed boat, the Ra, named after Ra, the Egyptian sun god. Its design was based on ancient Egyptian models and drawings. The boat was built by boatmen from Lake Chad in the Republic of Chad with papyrus reeds from Lake Tana in Ethiopia. It was launched off the coast of Morocco, and set sail in an attempt to cross the Atlantic. After several weeks, its crew modified the vessel in a manner that caused Ra to sag and take on water. Eventually Ra broke apart and was abandoned.

The following year, Heyerdahl organized the building of another similar boat, the Ra II. Boat builders from Lake Titicaca built this in Bolivia. Again, the vessel set sail from Morocco, succeeding this time and reaching Barbados.

In 1978, Heyerdahl constructed a third reed boat, the Tigris, named for the Tigris River, which defines the eastern boundary of Mesopotamia. The purpose of building this vessel was to demonstrate that Mesopotamia could have been linked through trade and migration to the Indus Valley civilization, now modern-day Pakistan. Tigris was constructed in Iraq and sailed along the Persian Gulf, then to Pakistan, finally entering the Red Sea. She remained at sea in a seaworthy manner for five months. Then in Djibouti, Tigris was burnt deliberately in protest at the wars that were then raging everywhere around the Red Sea and the Horn of Africa.

== Reed boats of Lake Titicaca ==
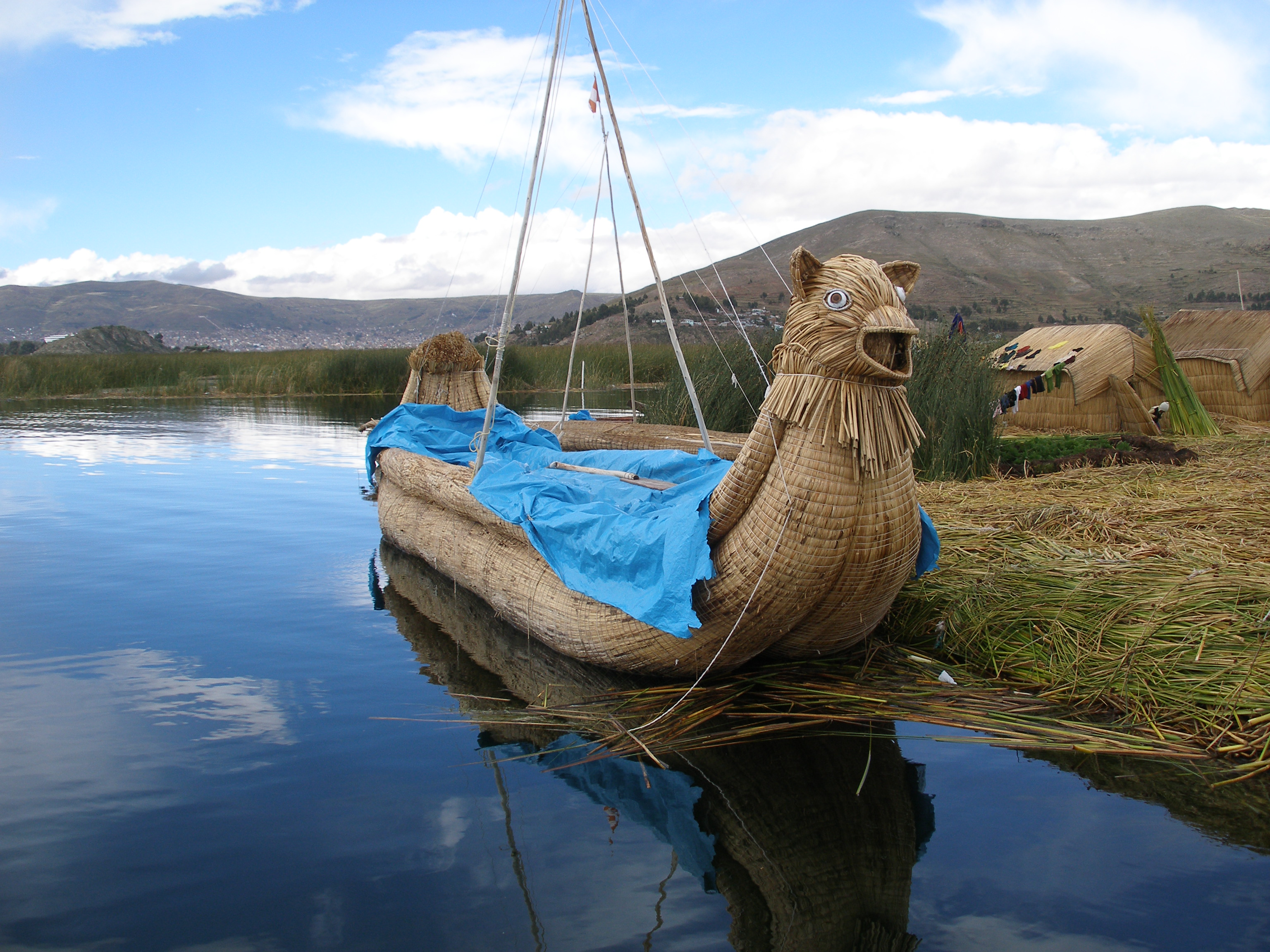
This sturdy reed boat of the Uros Islands can hold more than 20 people

Totora reeds grow in South America, particularly around Lake Titicaca, and also on Easter Island. These reeds have been used by various pre-Columbian South American civilizations to build reed boats. The boats, called balsa, vary in size from small fishing canoes to thirty metres long. They are still used on Lake Titicaca, located on the border of Peru and Bolivia, 3810 m above sea level.

The Uros are an indigenous people pre-dating the Incas. They live, still today, on man-made floating islands scattered across Lake Titicaca. These islands are also constructed from totora reeds. Each floating island supports between three and ten houses, also built of reeds. The Uros still build totora reed boats, which they use for fishing and hunting seabirds.

Reed boat craftsmen from Suriqui, a town on the Bolivian side of lake Titicaca, helped Thor Heyerdahl construct Ra II and Tigris. Thor Heyerdahl attempted to prove that the reed boats of Lake Titicaca derived from the papyrus boats of Egypt.

Near the south-eastern shore of Lake Titicaca lie the ruins of the ancient city state of Tiwanaku. Tiwanaku contains monumental architecture characterized by large stones of exceptional workmanship. Green andesite stones, that were used to create elaborate carvings and monoliths, originated from the Copacabana peninsula, located across Lake Titicaca. One theory is that these giant andesite stones, which weigh over 40 tons were transported some 90 kilometres across Lake Titicaca on reed boats.

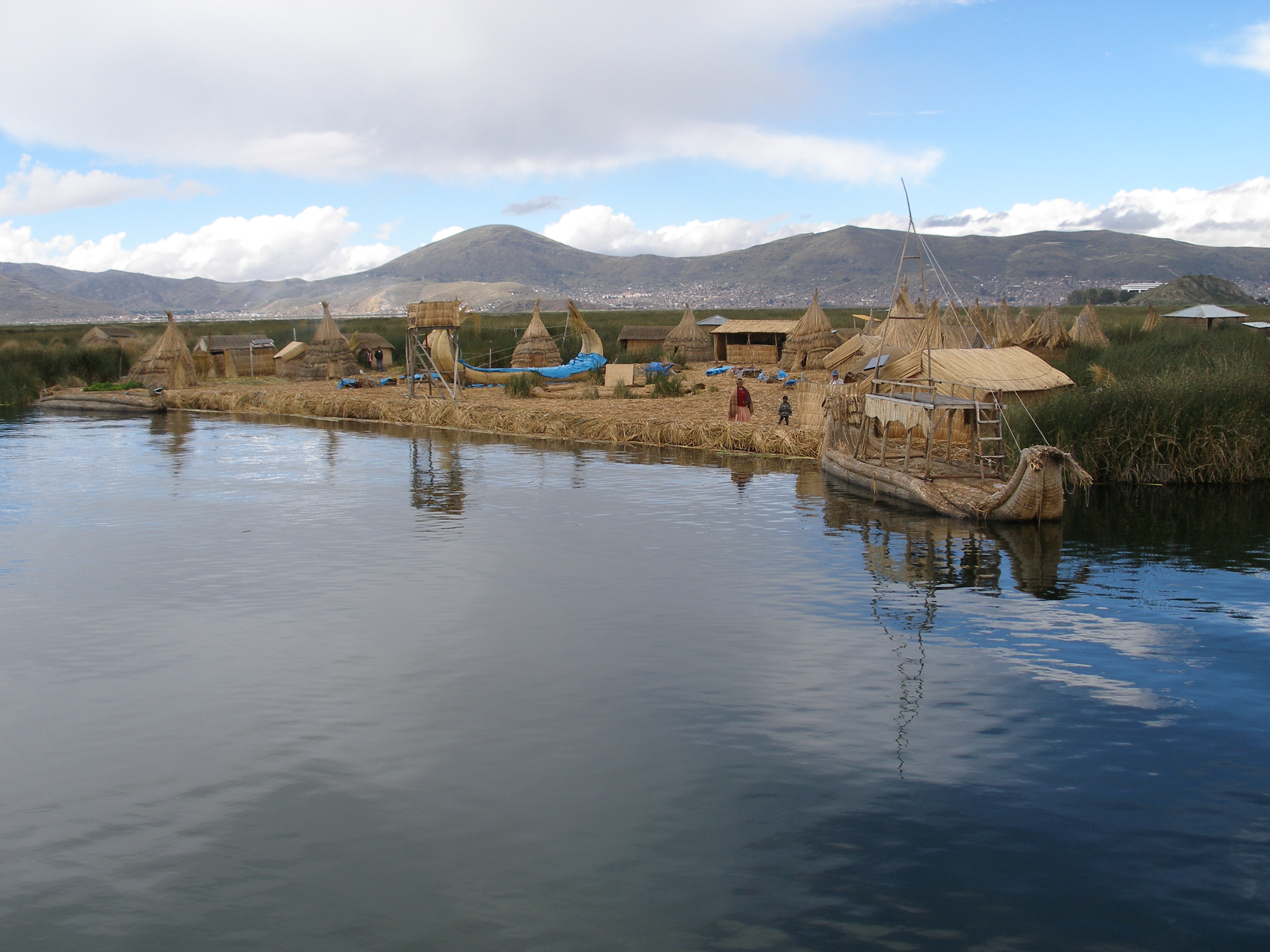
A floating reed island on Lake Titicaca

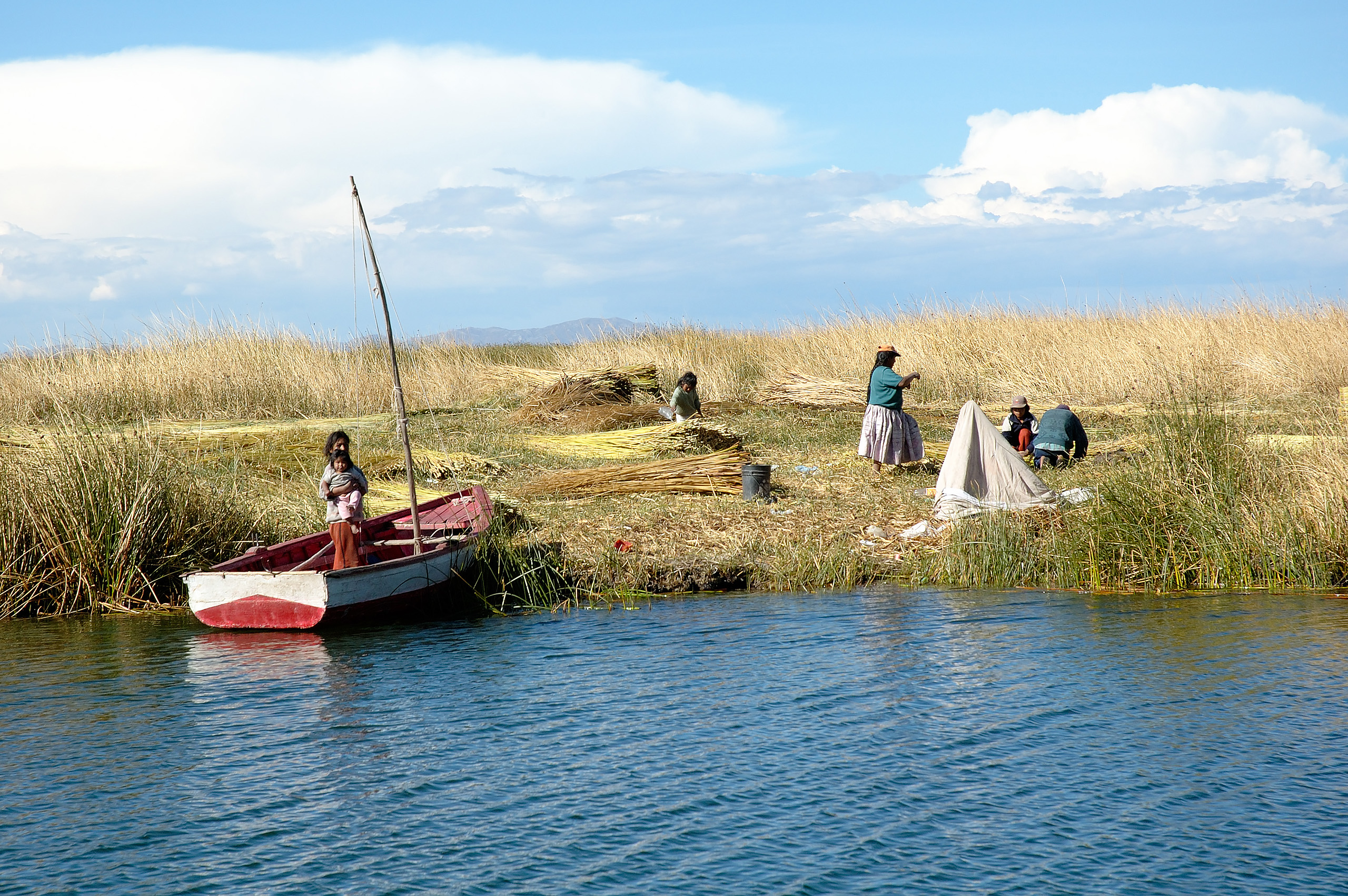
Uros harvesting totora on Lake Titicaca, used traditionally to build reed boats

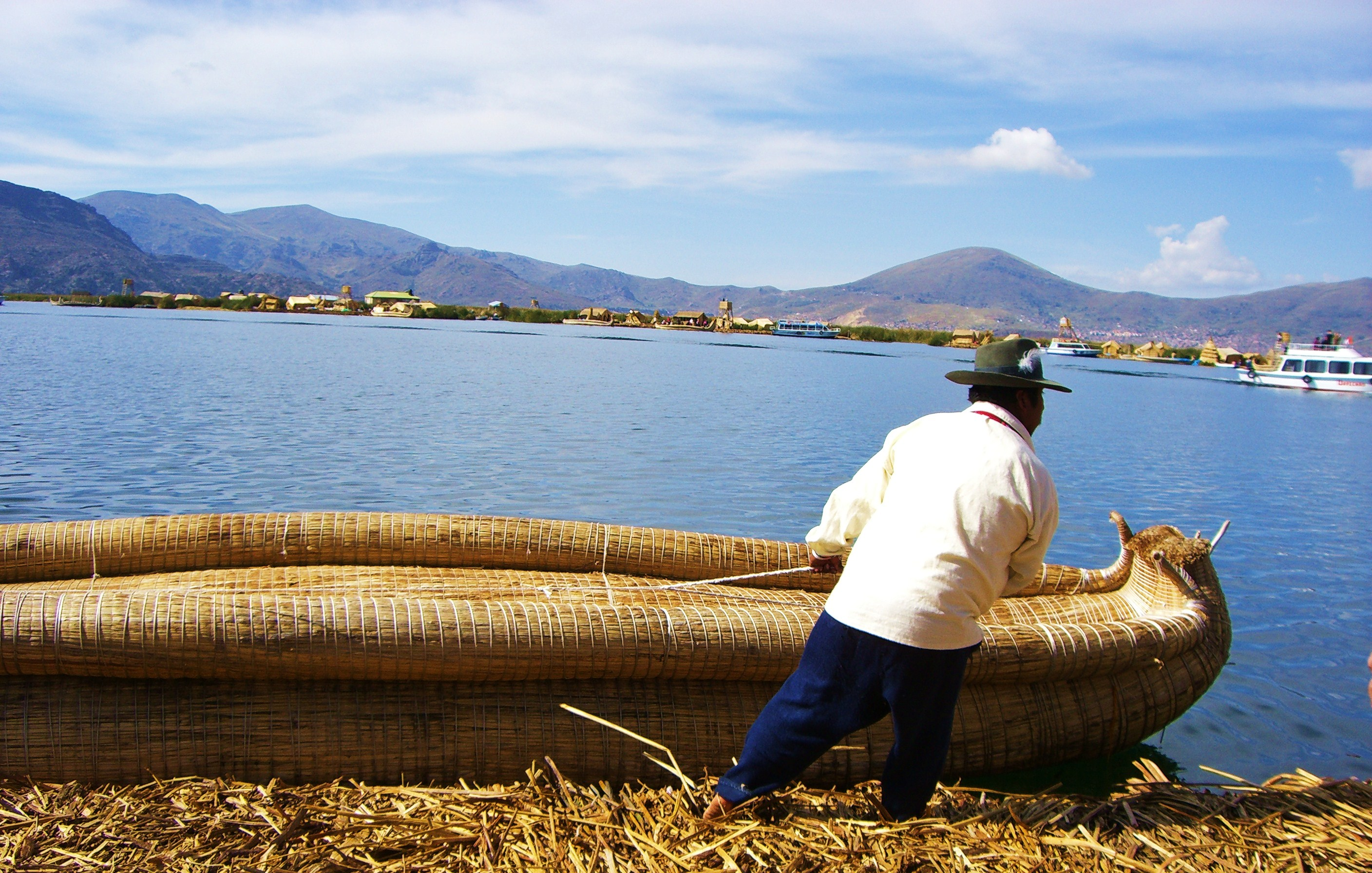
Uro man pulling a boat made of totora reeds

Uro-Indian at work in a reed boat

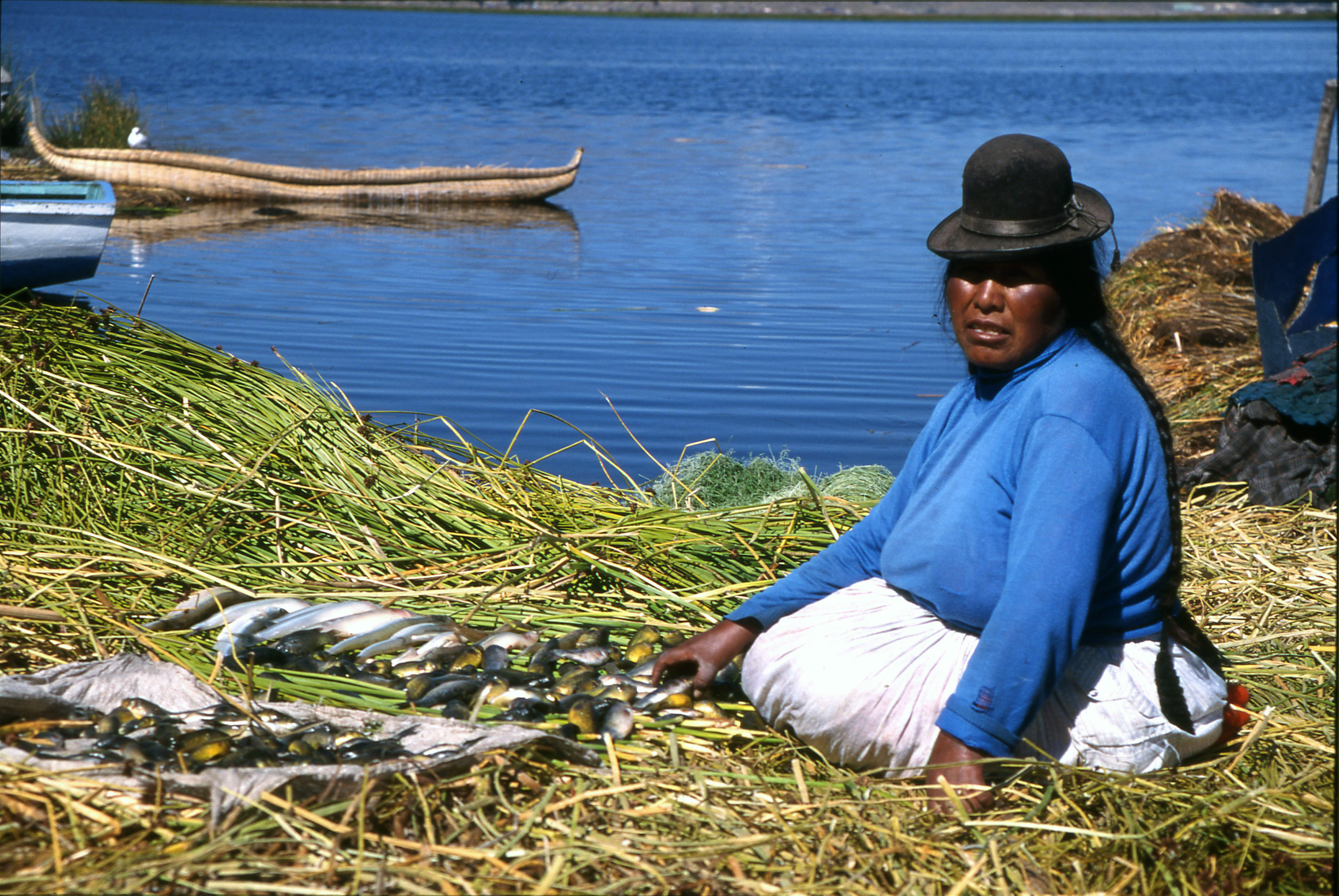
Back on the floating island with the catch

Reed boats were also constructed using totora reeds on Easter Island. Intriguingly, the design of these boats closely matches the design used in Peru.

== Other examples ==
- Tule reeds, which are widespread in North America, were used to construct reed boats by various Native American groups. People from Ohlone, Coast Miwok and Bay Miwok used tule to build boats for use in the San Francisco Bay estuary. Northern groups of Chumash also used tule to construct reed fishing canoes.
- As well as Peru and Bolivia, reed boats are still built in Ethiopia. and were used until recently in Corfu.
- In the account given by Eusebius of Caesarea of the Eridu Genesis is the claim that the reed boat constructed by Xisuthrus survived, at least until Berossus' day, in the "Corcyrean Mountains" of Armenia.
- Mokihi are made traditionally from raupo or korari in New Zealand. Still being constructed on the Waitaki river and in South Westland
- Prayer boats are used in a Hindu religious festival which takes place every year on the banks of the river Ganges where thousands of people burn incense and candles on small reed boats and float them down the river at night, the boats carrying their wishes and prayers.
- In 1836, Narcissa Whitman described reed boats pulled by Indians on horse back at Snake Fort, Fort Boise.
- In 2007, the reed boat Abora3, captained by the German scientist Dominique Görlitz, set out from New York to prove that other intercontinental sea journeys were possible in reed boats.
- Some coracle boats are also built out of reeds (see photo below).

== Gallery ==
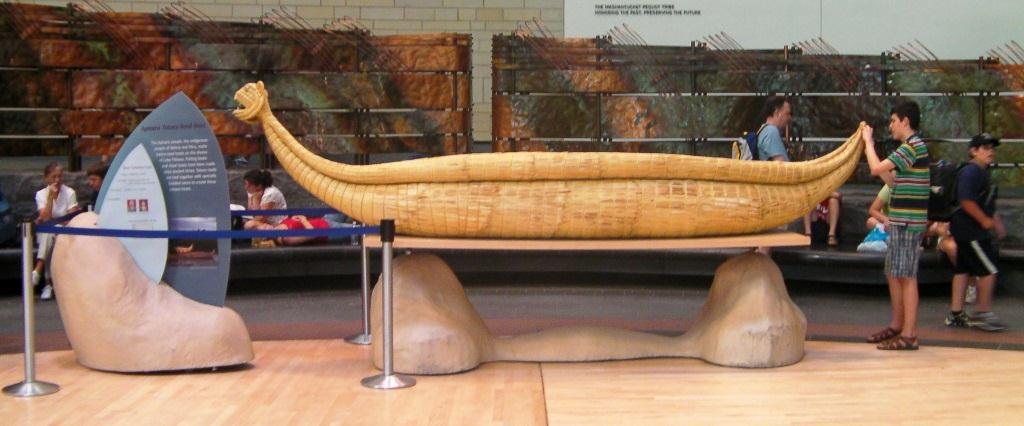
Aymara Totora Reed Boat on display at the Smithsonian, Washington, DC

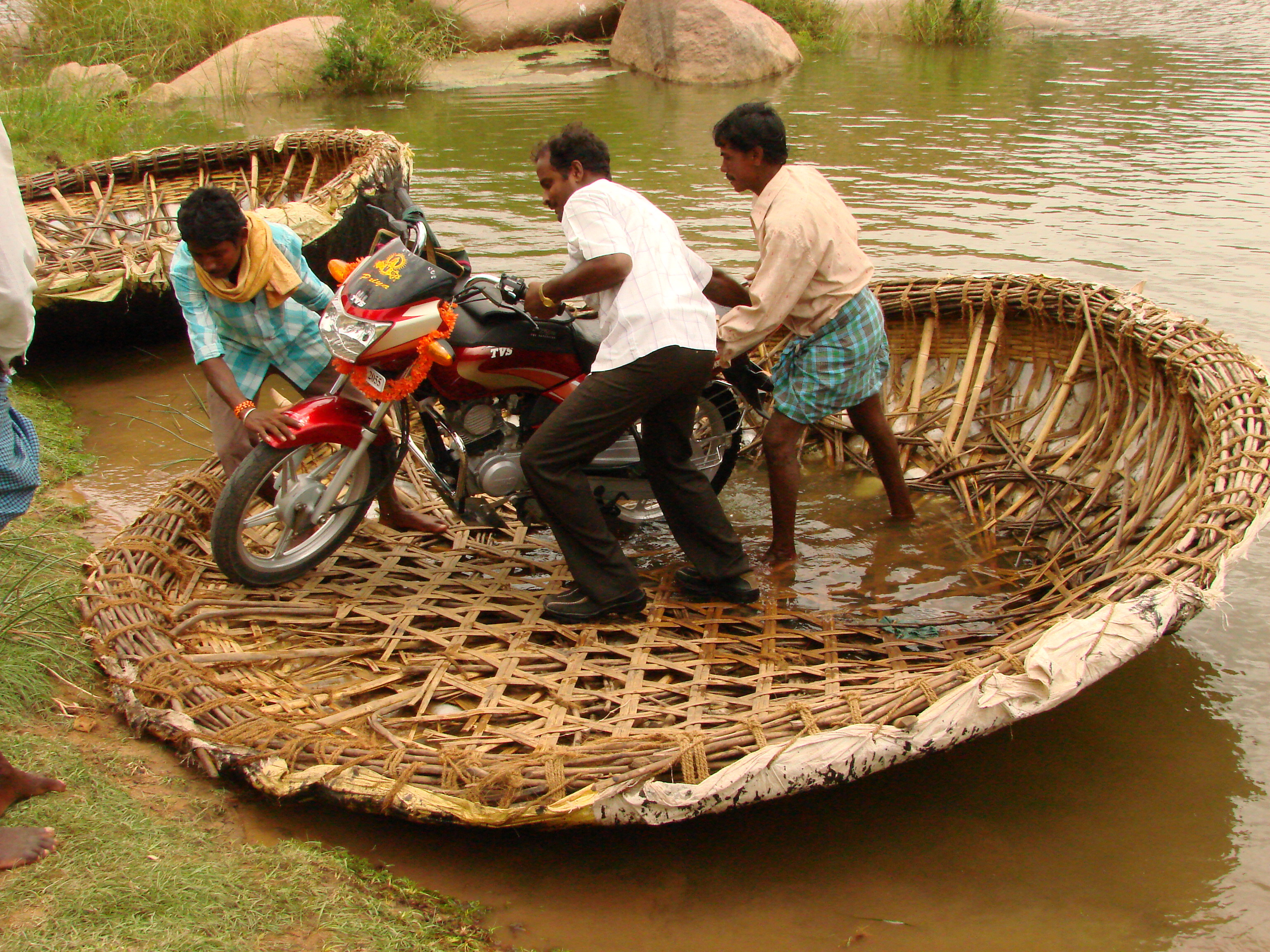
Passengers manoeuvre a motorcycle out of a woven-reed coracle ferry, near Hampi village, India. July 2008.

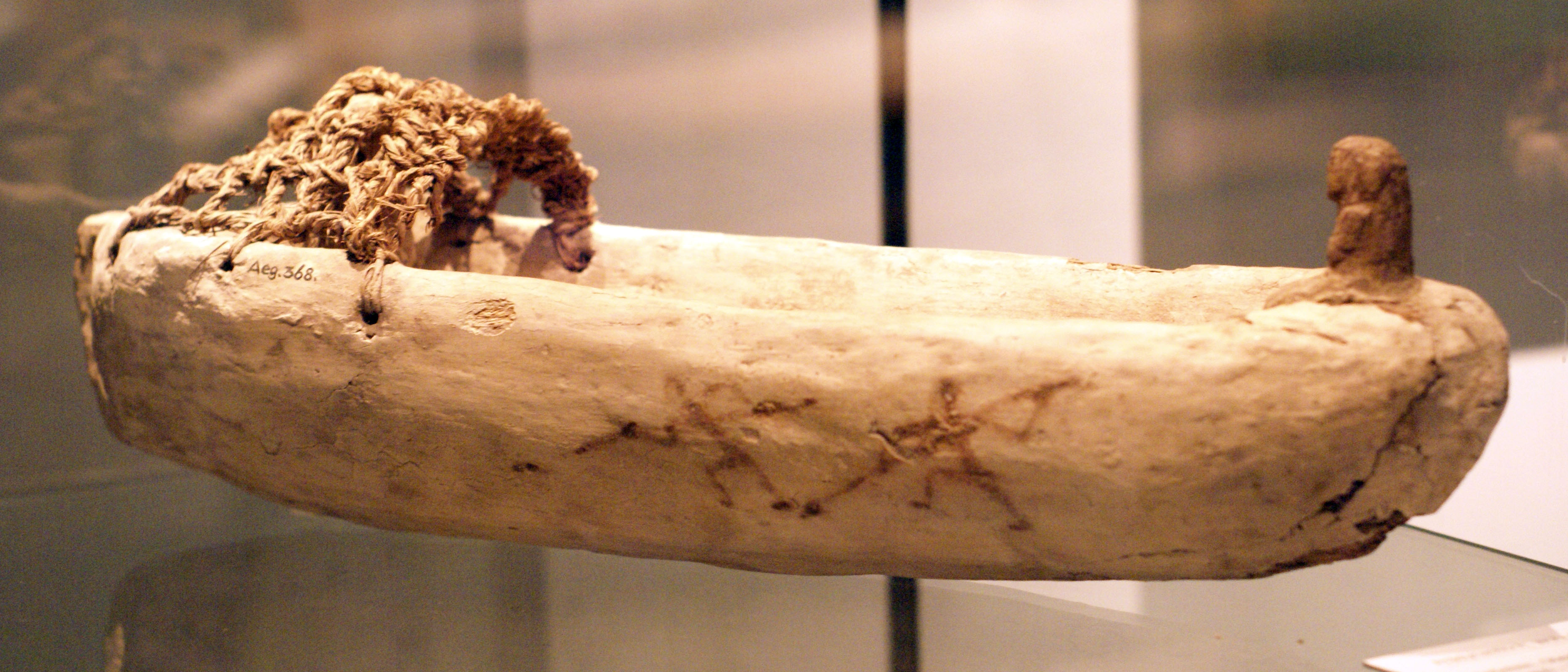
Burial object, barque with two human figures, Gebelein, Upper Egypt. Probably Naqada II, 3400-3200 BC. Clay-covered reed, 46 cm in length.

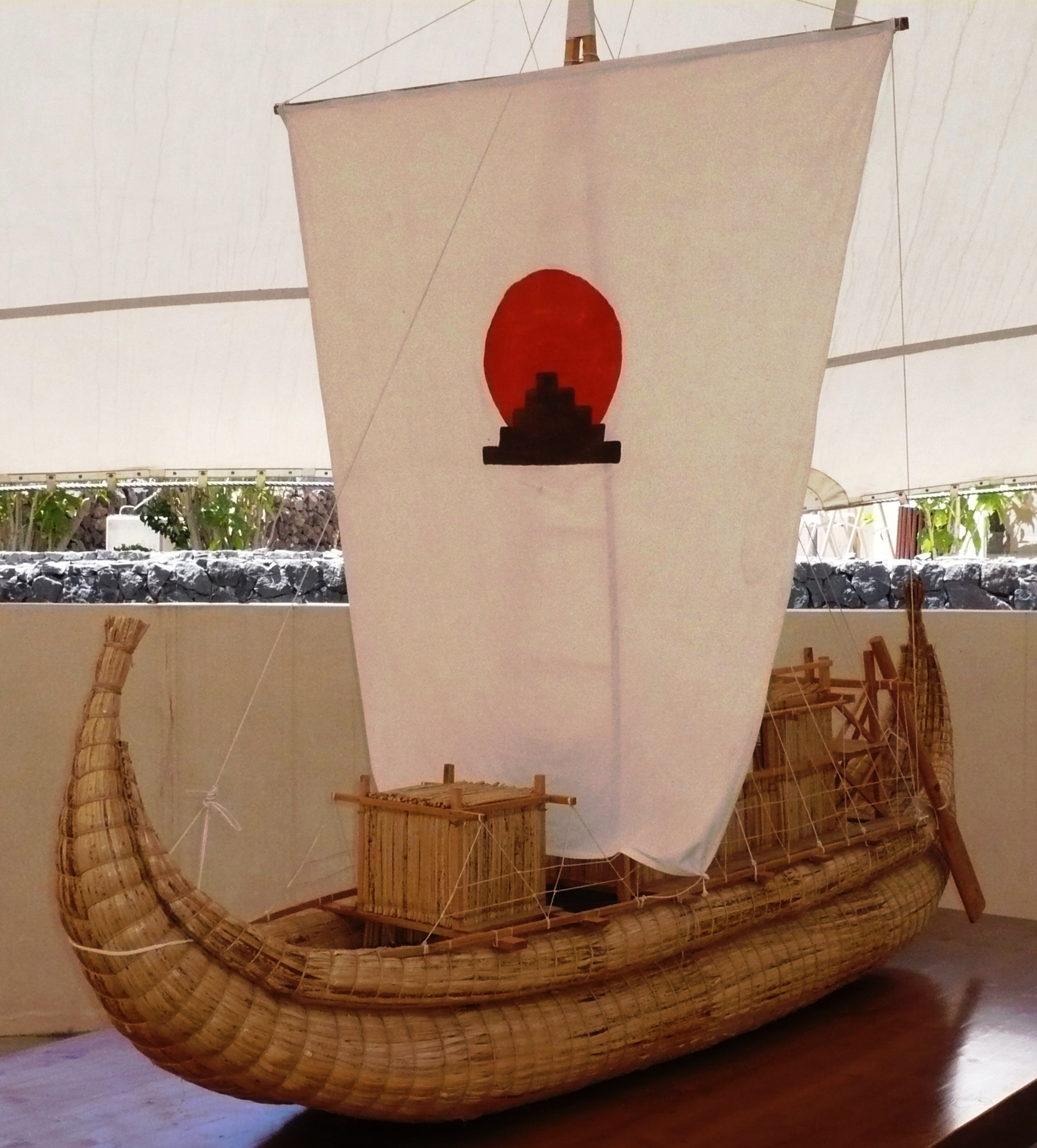
Model of the Tigris at the Pyramids of Güímar, Tenerife.

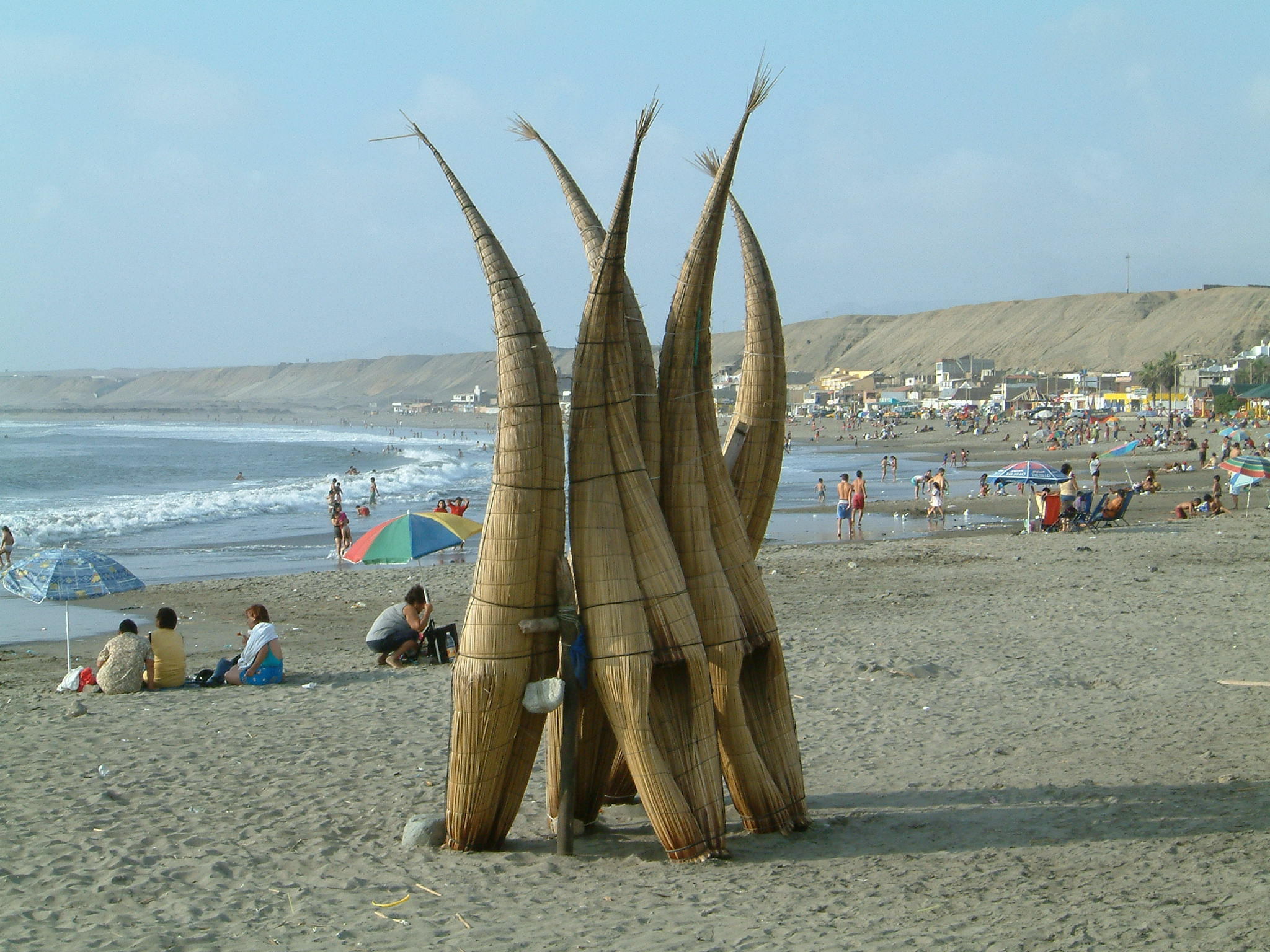
Contemporary reed boats stacked on a beach in Peru

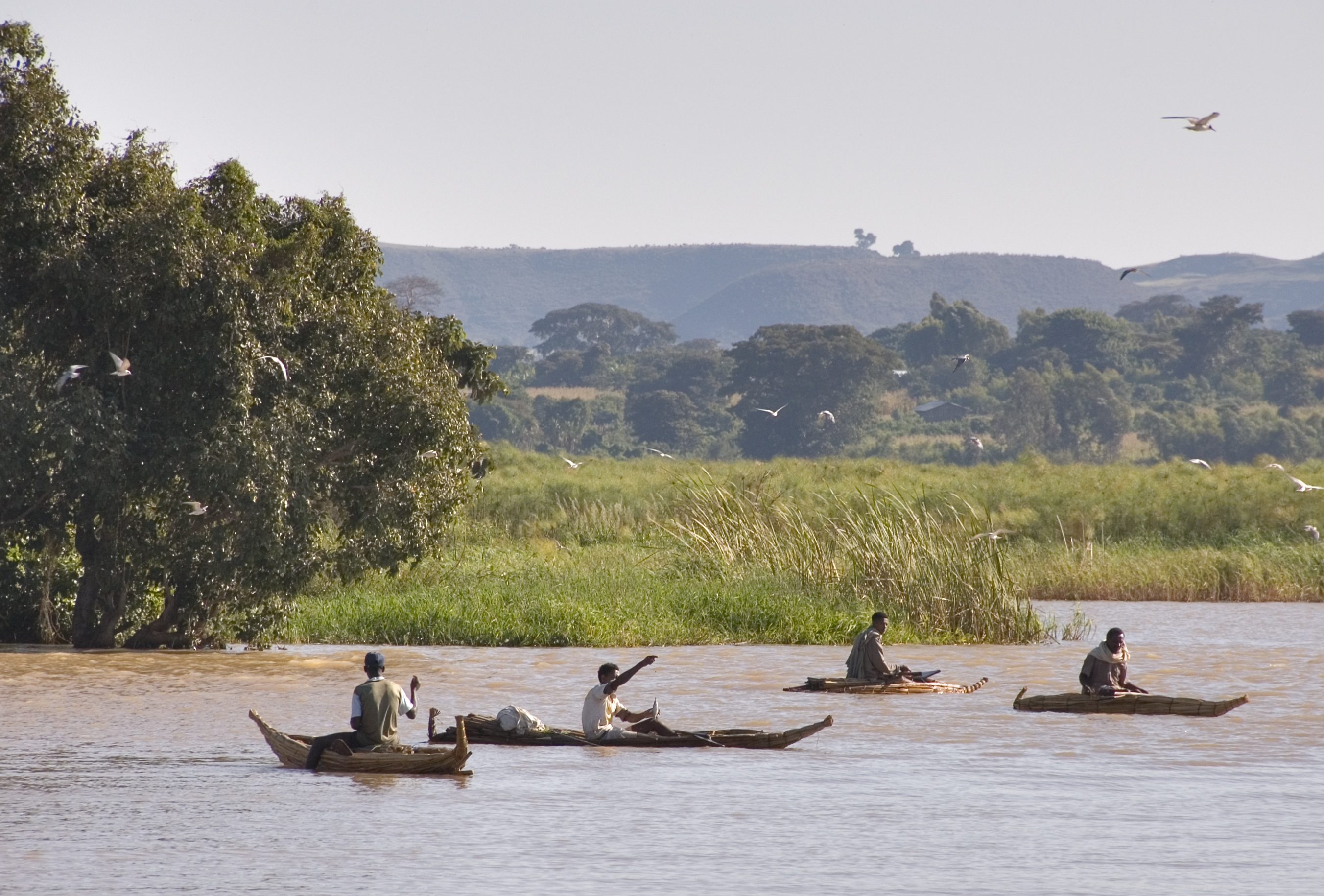
Fishermen cast their lines from papyrus boats (tankwas) on Lake Tana in northern Ethiopia

== See also ==
- Abora (expeditions)
- The Viracocha expedition
- Balsa (ship)
- Bipod mast
- Caballito de totora
- Cyperus papyrus
- Kitín Muñoz
- Traditional fishing boats
- Totora (plant)
- Tormod Granheim
- Tule
- Xisuthros
