= Cyperus pohlii =

Scientific classification
- Kingdom: Plantae
- Clade: Tracheophytes
- Clade: Angiosperms
- Clade: Monocots
- Clade: Commelinids
- Order: Poales
- Family: Cyperaceae
- Genus: Cyperus
- Species: C. pohlii

Binomial name
- Cyperus pohlii (Nees) Steud., 1854

Species of sedge

Cyperus pohlii (common name Piri-piri) is a species of sedge that is native to southern parts of tropical South America. It is sometimes regarded as a subspecies of the common papyrus (Cyperus papyrus).

== See also ==
- List of Cyperus species
