= Tankwa =

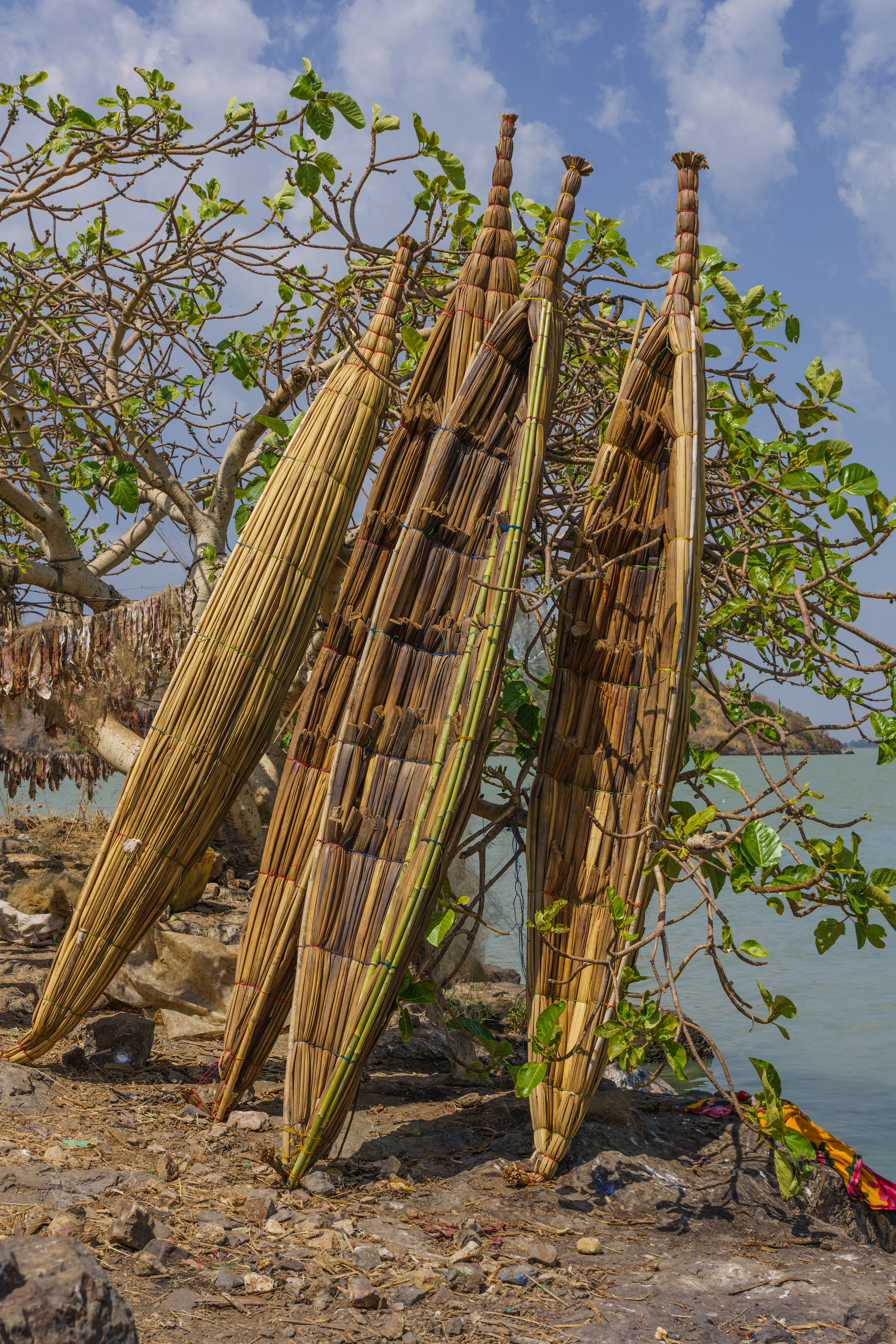
Fishing tankwas on an island of Lake Tana near Gorgora

A tankwa is a type of Ethiopian reed boat made from papyrus, used primarily in the area of Lake Tana.
