= Bipod mast =

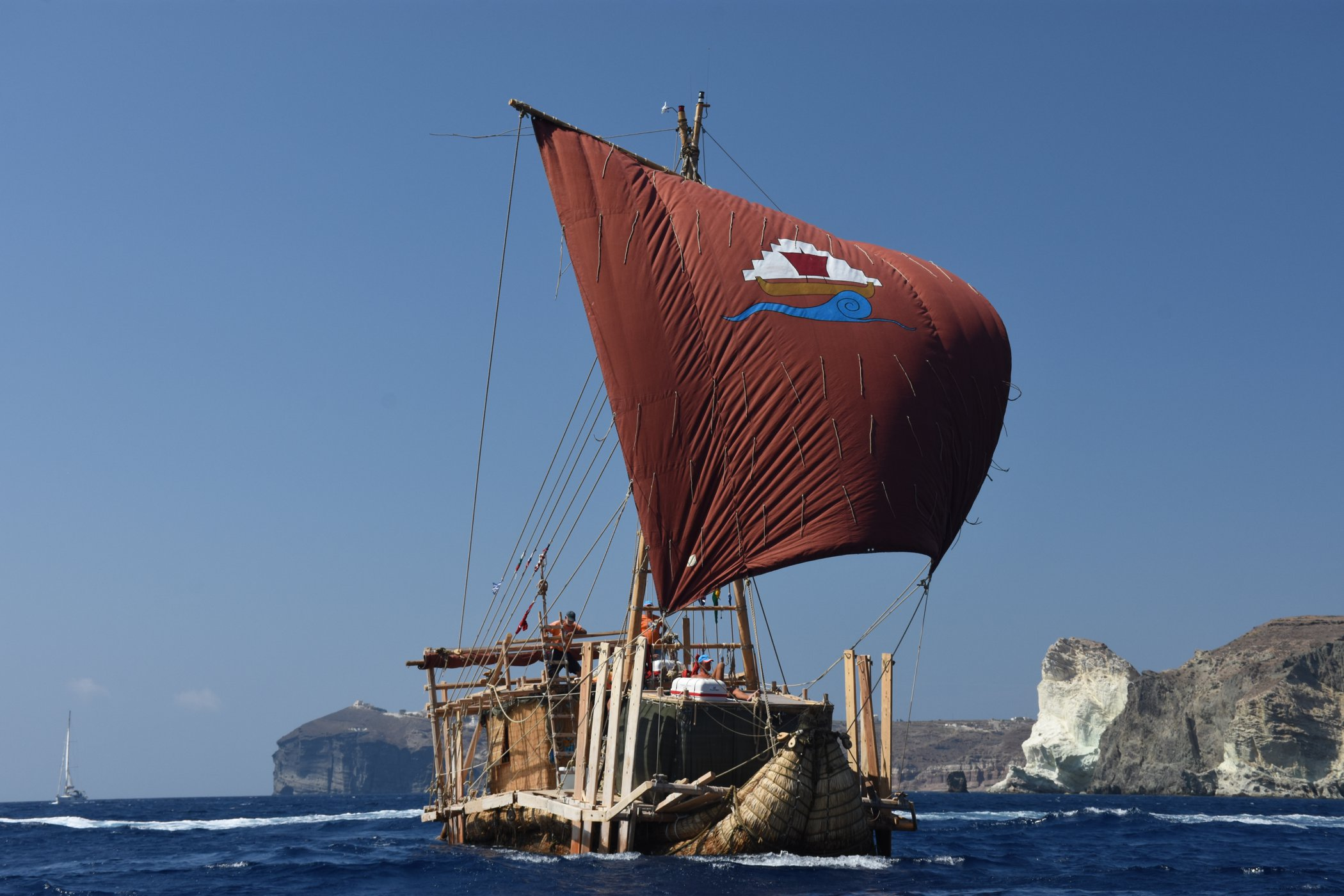
Reed boat Abora IV with bipod mast.

The bipod mast is a two-legged mast used originally in Egypt during the 3rd millennium BCE. It can be described as two poles secured together at the top, forming a thin isosceles triangle. It did not appear until the Old Kingdom, third dynasty, and disappeared after the sixth dynasty when the pole mast took over during the Middle Kingdom.

The reason that the bipod mast was used for only a short time is also the reason that it developed in the first place. At the time reed boats were being used to carry goods up and down the Nile. A mast and sail were wanted to make these journeys go more quickly through wind power. The problem was that a pole mast would have to be secured or stepped in the center of the craft, at its weakest point. This would have caused the bottom of the boat to rupture. Because reed materials were not strong enough to support a single pole, the bipod was developed to better distribute the weight. The bipod mast continued to be used even when builders begun using wood to construct boats. It was used both along the Nile and once actual seafaring began. When it was reed materials being used the bipod mast was secured through backstays. Once the builders switched over to wood the two rods were tied to the wood continued to be secured with cables. These bipod masts could easily be stored by folding one side into the other laying it across the ship with its weight evenly distributed on stands also called forked crutches. Thus, the bipod masts were convenient for travel along the Nile. The Nile is easy to travel when heading north, with the current, but when heading south, sailors must use man power and wind power against the current. For this reason the development of the bipod mast was very important. The bipod mast allowed for faster travel south. It is likely that this improved trade because Egyptians did not waste as much time traveling south. Also, the development of the mast was part of the transition into seafaring. In voyaging across the sea a mast and sail are required. So, in conclusion the bipod mast played a major part in ushering in overseas trade.
