= Abora (expeditions) =

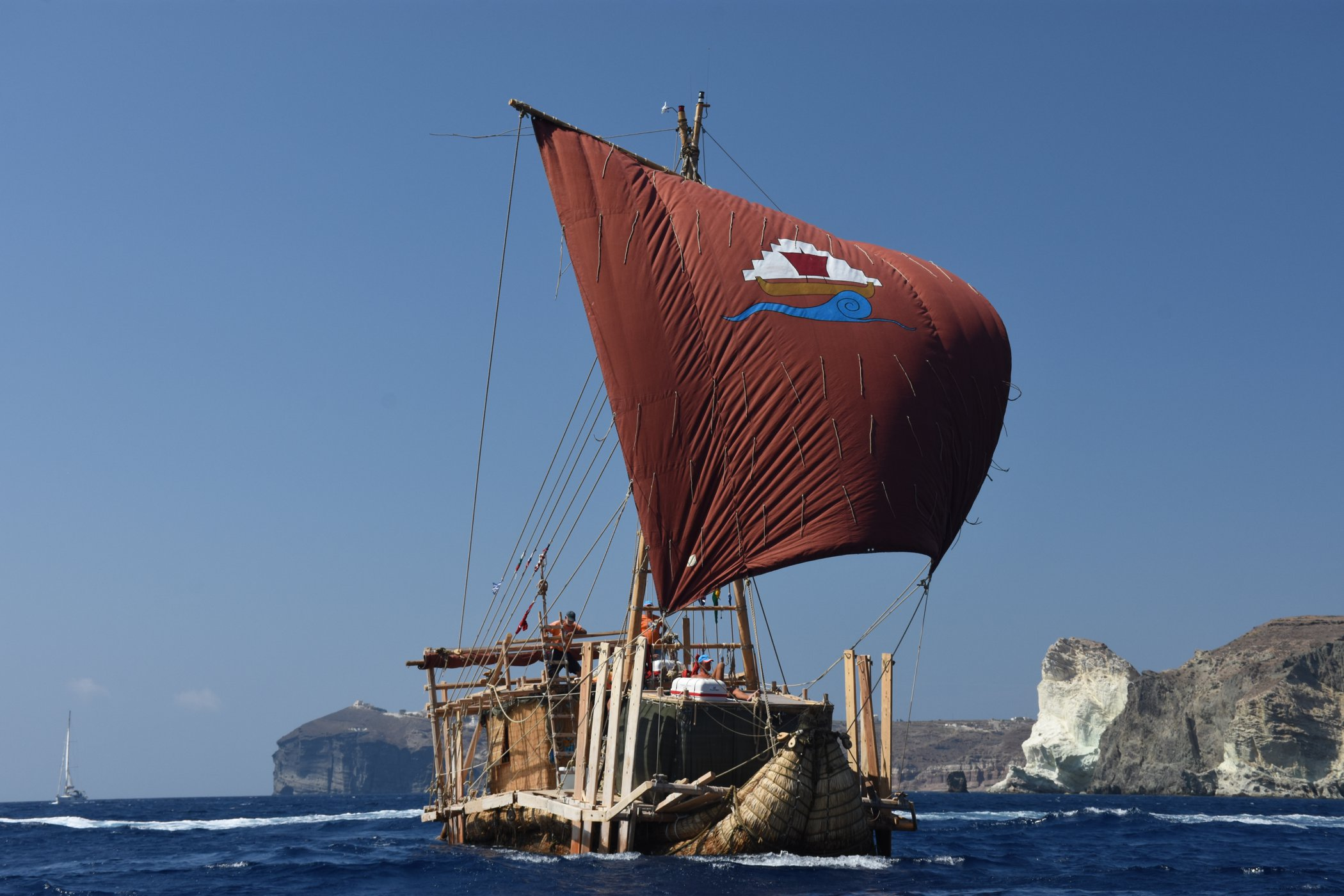
- Abora IV (2019) in the caldera of Santorini
- Name: Abora
- Builder: Abora I: Built by volunteers. Abora II–IV: Aymara Indians, Huatajata, Lake Titicaca, Bolivia

General characteristics
- Class & type: reed boat
- Length: 32.8 ft (10.0 m)
- Sail plan: Square rig with bipod mast, steering oar, and leeboards

Abora is the name of several reed boats built by the German explorer Dominique Görlitz. The expeditions were inspired by previous trans-oceanic expeditions by the Norwegian explorer Thor Heyerdahl. Main aim of the Abora expeditions was to prove that a keel-less reed boat could be steered crosswise and against prevailing winds, using sideboards (leeboards) in lieu of a fixed keel. The name of the vessels was derived from the Canarian deity Abora.

The Abora I originated as a school project in Germany using locally grown Giant (Miscanthus). All subsequent vessels were commissioned to boat builders from the Aymara nation living at Lake Titicaca in Bolivia; the same boat builders worked already for Thor Heyerdahl. As building material they used the very sturdy and durable Totora reed which is far better suited for this purpose.

== Vessels ==
=== Abora I ===
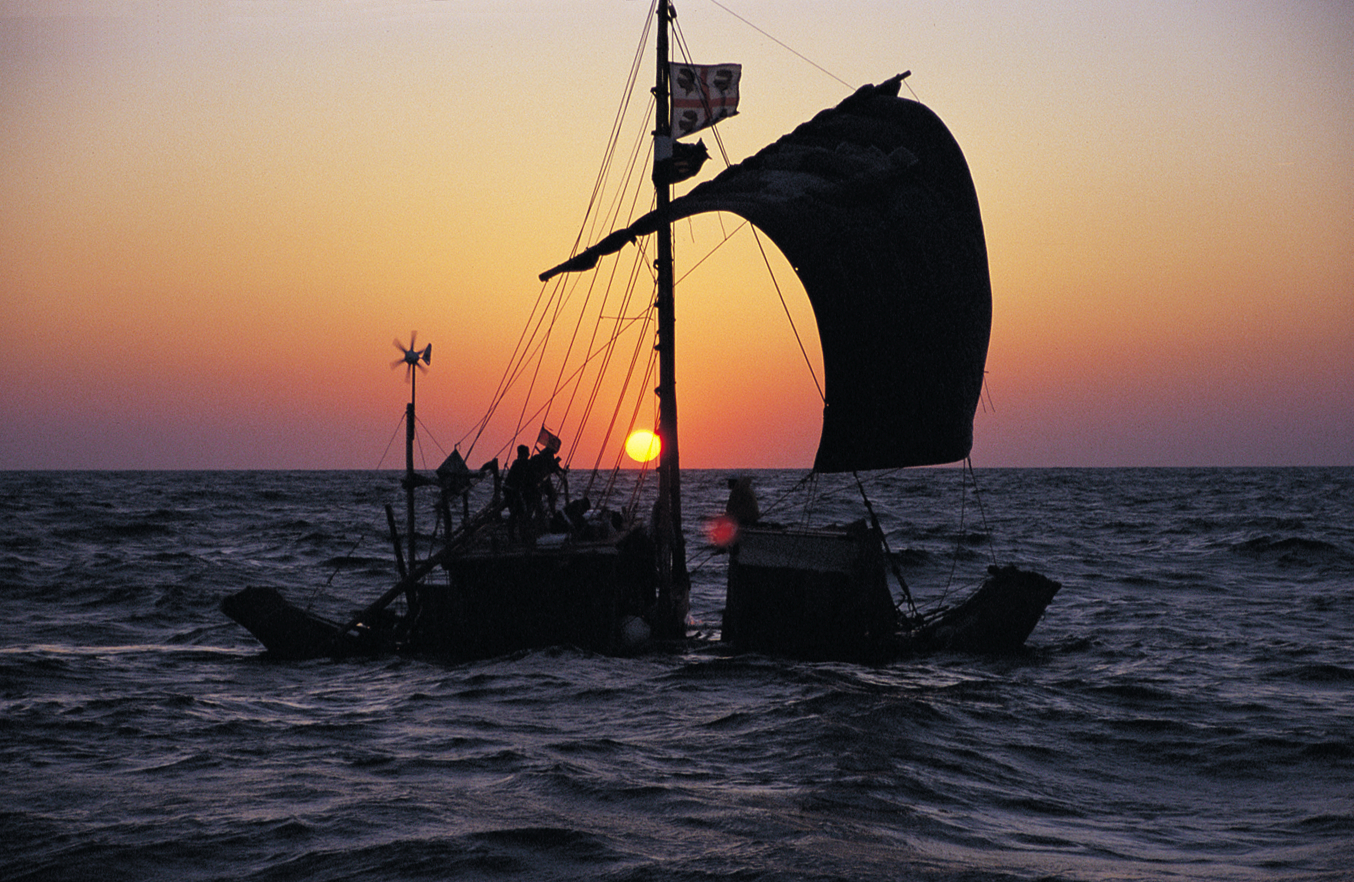
ABORA I (1999)

The Abora (or Abora I, in retrospective) was designed, built and used between 1996 and 1999. It sailed from Alghero (Sardinia, Italy) to Piombino (Tuscany, Italy).

=== Abora II ===
The Abora II sailed in 2002 across the Mediterranean: from Alexandria (Egypt) to Beirut (Lebanon), Cyprus and back to Alexandria. It thus became the first modern-time reed boat which managed to complete an extended round trip and then to return to the port of departure. The departure at Alexandria coincided with the inauguration of the Bibliotheca Alexandrina, the new Alexandrian library; the Abora crew brought some gifts (books) from Thor Heyerdahl's Kon-Tiki Museum in Oslo, Norway in honor of the inauguration. Thor Heyerdahl had also personally supported the preparation of the Abora I and II expeditions; by coincidence the launch of the Abora II took place on 18 April 2002, which turned out to be the day when Thor Heyerdahl died.

=== Abora III ===
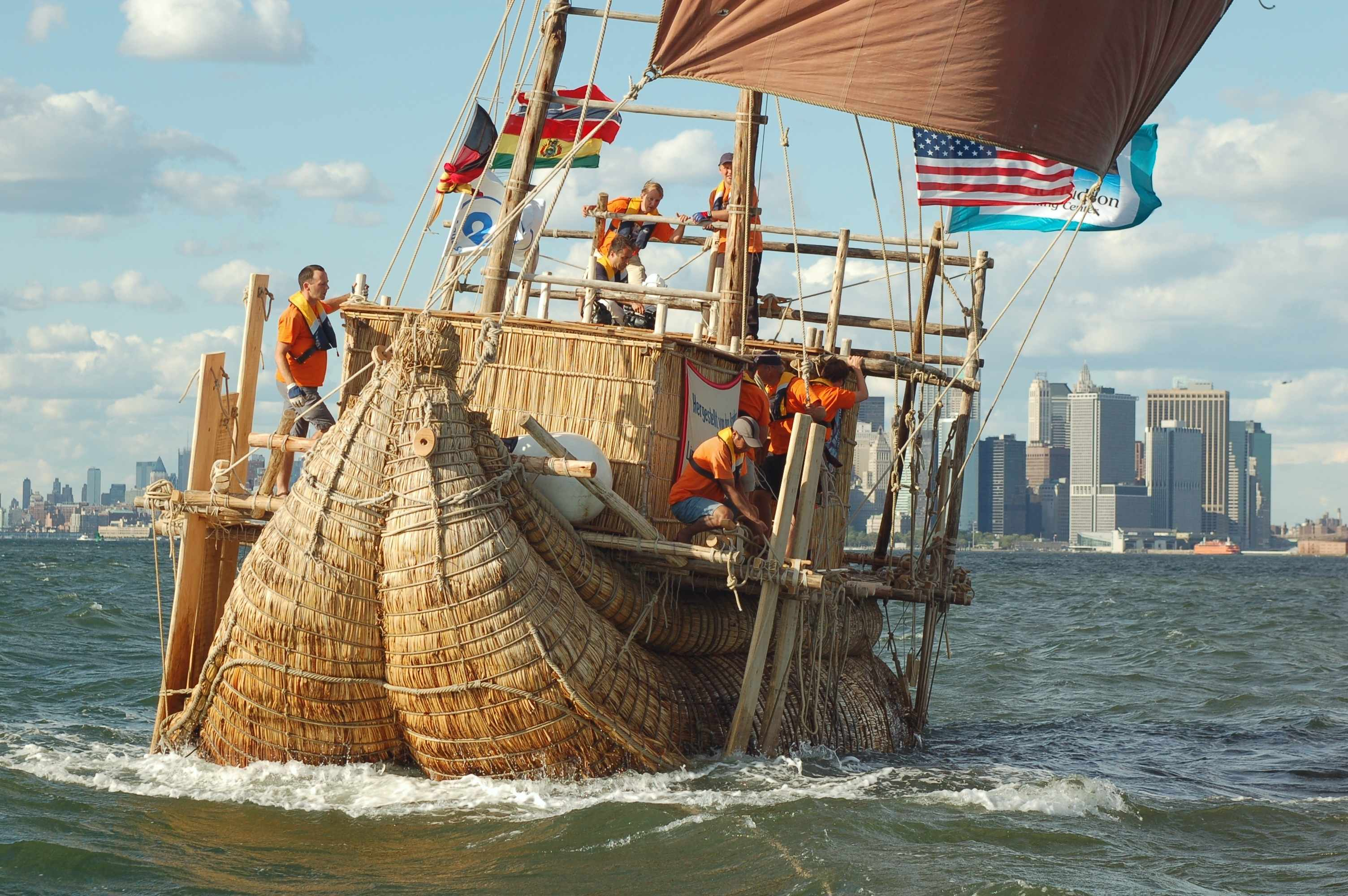
ABORA III (2007), New York

With Abora III, Dominique Görlitz attempted the first ever crossing of the Atlantic from West to East with a reed boat. Görlitz considered it possible that such events actually took place in antiquity. As a motivation, he particularly quoted the finding of traces of cocaine and nicotine in Egyptian mummies, including chopped tobacco leaves and the remains of a Mexican tobacco beetle in the mummy of Ramses II (1298–1213 BC). Mainstream scholars have shown that there are possible Old World sources of cocaine and nicotine. The finding of tobacco leaves became a popular topic in fringe literature and the media and it was seen as proof of contact between Ancient Egypt and the New World. The investigator Maurice Bucaille noted that when the mummy was unwrapped in 1886 the abdomen was left open and "it was no longer possible to attach any importance to the presence inside the abdominal cavity of whatever material was found there, since the material could have come from the surrounding environment." Following the renewed discussion of tobacco sparked by Balabanova's research and its mention in a 2000 publication by Rosalie David, a study in the journal Antiquity suggested that reports of both tobacco and cocaine in mummies "ignored their post-excavation histories" and pointed out that the mummy of Ramesses II had been moved five times between 1883 and 1975.

Compared to an East-West crossing, which Thor Heyerdahl successfully demonstrated in 1970 with the barely maneuverable reed boat Ra II, a west-east crossing of the Atlantic is much more difficult. This must be done further north along the Gulf Stream. However, the Gulf Stream does not flow evenly, but forms huge eddies. Furthermore, the winds there blow inconsistently from all directions. This means that this crossing cannot take place as a practically pure drift, as in the case of the Ra II in the opposite direction, rather the reed boat must be able to cover longer distances by wind even under adverse conditions.

The hull of the boat was again manufactured in Bolivia (in 2006). The boat was finalized one year later in New York. The Abora III expedition started in New York on July 11, 2007. An initially supportive Azores high dissolved completely in early August, and the crew faced one storm after another. Two of these storm lows reached hurricane strengths with wind speeds of up to 51 knots. These bad weather fronts affected the Abora III, but did not yet lead to serious damage. However, three side swords broke during the first storm, but this happened close enough to the American mainland that replacement swords could be delivered and replaced. In mid-August, after 500 km of a total of around 6000 km, a calm delayed the trip. A three-day hurricane then damaged the rear of the Abora III on August 27, 2007 in such a way that it had to be separated from the hull. during the subsequent 4 days, the crew reinstalled the intact rudder and moved the mast further towards the bow. The modified Abora III could temporarily set full sail and even sail up to 90° to the wind. On September 4, the next storm with wind force 10 severely affected both the Abora III and an escort vessel approaching from the Azores. Therefore, the crew abandoned the experiment on September 5, 2007, about 900 kilometres from the Azores, the 11-member crew and switched to the escort vessel. The reed boat was left to the sea after cutting the strings that held the hull together.

A message in a bottle thrown into the water before the boat was evacuated was found in the Bahamas in October 2010. This illustrates that a West-East crossing of the Atlantic requires an intact sailing ability of the boat (in contrast to the opposite direction: Thor Heyerdahl's Ra II was also badly damaged in 1970, but was still able to drift to America with the help of the Canary Current).

=== Abora IV ===
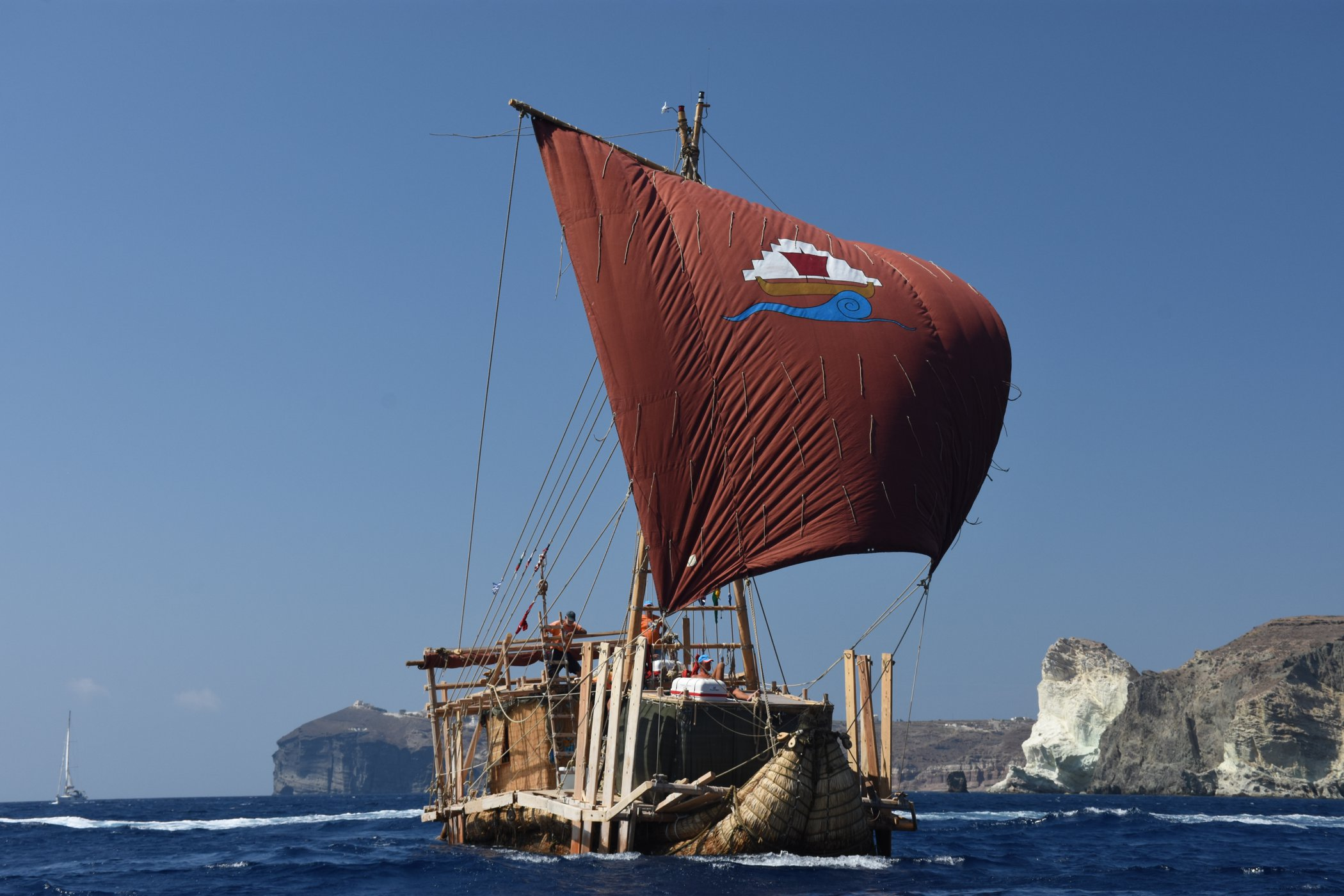
Abora IV at Santorini Caldera

The aim of the Abora IV expedition was to retrace possible trade contacts between the Black Sea and the Mediterranean. Herodotus mentioned in his Histories trading contacts between the Egyptians and the Caucasus on the eastern Black Sea coast; according to him, especially metals were imported into Egypt via this route. According to the expedition leader Dominique Görlitz's assumption, tin and amber were also exported from Central Europe to Egypt via the Balkans and finally the Black Sea to the Mediterranean. Varna in Bulgaria was chosen as the starting point of the expedition both because of the place's historic significance (Varna Necropolis) and for practical reasons; the expedition received strong support from the Varna Archaeological Museum.

The final construction took place from May to August 2019 in Beloslav near Varna. Due to the late delivery of the prefabricated reed bundles from Bolivia and due to extremely bad weather conditions in Bulgaria, the launch of the Abora was greatly delayed and the start of the expedition could only take place on August 16. The Abora IV sailed through the Black Sea to Istanbul in Turkey, then through the Bosporus (on tow, for safety reasons), through the Marmara Sea and into the Dardanelles (again on tow) to Çanakkale (a modern harbor near ancient Troy), then onward into the Aegean Sea. Here, the first station was the Greek island of Limnos, where the vessel managed to enter and to leave the prehistoric port of Poliochni without being supported by a tug boat. From there, it sailed on to Santorini, hereby managing to pass several straits between several Greek islands. During the expedition, Dominique Görlitz received the offer from the Turkish Ministry of Culture in Ankara to exhibit the reed boat in the Patara Archeology Park (near Antalya) as a permanent exhibit. Thereupon it was decided to sail from Santorini straight to Kaş (a modern harbour near Patara) at the Lycian coast. Here, the Abora IV arrived on 19 September; the entire distance from Varna to Kaş was covered in 34 days. As planned, the vessel is now on permanent display on the agora of the ancient city of Patara.

== Scientific assessment ==
Like most experimental-archaeological projects, also the ABORA projects could only examine the technical feasibility of a proposed method. Whether these methods were indeed exploited in the past, can only be clarified by archaeological finds. The Abora expeditions specifically acclaimed to have reproduced an ancient navigation technology based on the use of leeboards. The expedition organizers consider their approach being corroborated by:

- ancient petroglyphes of vessels that show explicit details which can be interpreted as leeboards.
- ancient depictions of reed rafts in general: Even if no details of the steering technology are shown, the depictions prove as such that reed rafts were in widespread use, and this again suggests that those vessels were also navigable, able to conduct e.g. round trips, or harbour approaches. Larger reed rafts are too heavy to be moved by oars and thus depended on their sailing capabilities.

The expedition leader Dominique Görlitz presented various examples of such depictions (with and without leeboards) in his books and on the official project website.

Ethnological evidence for the use of large navigable rafts exists only from South America, where such rafts were in use also after the Spanish conquest. These rafts used so-called centerboards or guaras; they could be navigated even without a rudder. Also Thor Heyerdahl conducted already some experiments using those guaras. Therefore, Heyerdahl followed the ABORA expeditions with great interest until his death in 2002.

Positive appraisals of the ABORA projects came also from various other scientists, for instance Havva Iskan (Akdeniz University, Turkey, lead archaeologist at Patara, where the ABORA IV is now on permanent display).

In 2007, during the ABORA III expedition, a critical article appeared in the German popular-scientific journal Spektrum der Wissenschaft. It quotes a German Egyptologist who doubts Görlitz' interpretation of details of boat depictions as leeboards, as well as his assumptions with regard to the age of those depictions, but does not offer an alternative explanation. Specifically with regard to the Abora III expedition (attempt of a West-East Atlantic crossing), doubts are also expressed about alleged evidences for tobacco or cocaine use in ancient Egypt.
