= Kitín Muñoz =

Spanish navigator, scientist and sociological explorer

- Born: Antonio José Muñoz y Valcárcel; 19 November 1958 (age 66); Sidi Ifni, Spanish Sahara (now part of Morocco)
- Occupation(s): Adventurer, scientist
- Spouse: Princess Kalina of Bulgaria (m. 2002)
- Children: Simeón Hassan Muñoz
- Parent(s): Luis Muñoz y Cebrián; Isabel Valcárcel y Muñoz

Antonio José Muñoz y Valcárcel (born 19 November 1958), commonly known as Kitín Muñoz, is a Spanish adventurer, scientist and former commando. He was appointed a UNESCO Goodwill Ambassador in 1997.

== Life and career ==
Inspired by Thor Heyerdahl, Muñoz made three attempts to cross the Pacific Ocean, two of which failed, and one failed attempt to cross the Atlantic Ocean to prove that ancient seafarers sailing in reed boats could have crossed the oceans before the European expeditions of the 15th century.

Muñoz is also a former member of the Spanish Army special forces (the Mando de Operaciones Especiales), and an honorary consul of Morocco.

=== Marriage ===
On 26 October 2002, Muñoz married Princess Kalina of Bulgaria, Duchess of Saxe, Countess of Murány, only daughter of Simeon II of Bulgaria. The royal wedding was the subject of a television documentary.

Their son, Simeon Hassan Muñoz, was born on 14 March 2007 in Sofia, Bulgaria. In 2015, Muñoz, Kalina, and their son were living near Rabat, in Morocco.

== Honours ==
=== Dynastic ===
- (Tsardom of Bulgaria (1908–1946)) House of Saxe-Coburg-Gotha-Koháry: Grand Officer of the Order of Saint Alexander (1 July 2024).

== See also ==
- The Viracocha expedition
