= Viracocha expedition =

The Viracocha expedition were expeditions led by professional explorer Phil Buck in 2000 and 2003 when he led multiple international teams across the Pacific Ocean, traveling from South America to Easter Island on two distinct ancient-style reed rafts with the aim of proving that South American mariners could have reached Easter Island. Both vessels were constructed using four Andean materials: totora reeds, natural fiber rope, cotton sails, and wood.

== The Viracocha I Expedition ==
Inspired by explorer Thor Heyerdahl before his death, Buck's plan was to support the theory that ancient South American voyagers crossed vast ocean expanses in various types of boats including the ancient style reed raft that were quite possibly the key factor of human migration and the spread of civilization. The expedition set sail from Arica, Chile, and completed the voyage to Easter Island, Polynesia, in 44 days in 2000. It was the first primitive boat of any kind to reach the island in modern times.

=== Controversy ===
Kitín Muñoz, the leader of previous Pacific reed boat expeditions, criticized Viracocha in the press, claiming that the use of synthetic rope in the boat's construction made the experiment invalid. According to the builders, they did use a small amount of synthetic twine, but judged that the effect on the durability of the boat was negligible.

== The Viracocha II Expedition ==
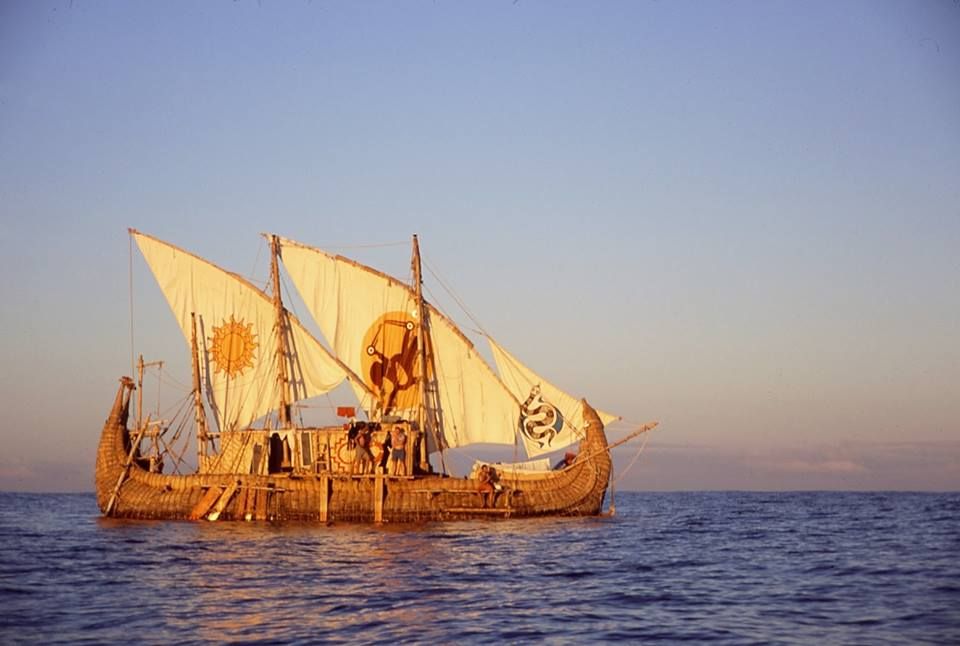
Viracocha II

In March 2003, a team of eight men, again led by Phil Buck, set sail from Vina del Mar, Chile aboard a completely new reed raft, the Viracocha II, in an attempt to sail 10,000 nautical miles across the entire Pacific Ocean to Cairns, Australia, via Easter Island and other islands of Polynesia. The raft was severely damaged during the launch and the team was unable to test the raft to its full potential. Even with the starboard side damage, the raft still managed to make the long traverse to Easter Island for the second time.

== Reed rafts ==
Raft building is one of the oldest maritime technologies. Throughout history, reed rafts have been constructed in almost every part of the world where reeds have grown, most notably in regions near the Mediterranean, in South America and Easter Island. Today, only a handful of places still practice the ancient art of reed raft construction. The Aymara reed boat builders of Bolivia's Lake Titicaca are the foremost builders in the world today, having built the hulls of Viracocha I and II. The art of reed boat building has been passed down through generations and survives on both the Peruvian and Bolivian sides of the lake.

== Construction of the Reed Rafts ==
The Viracocha I and II were two boats that measured 64 feet (20 m) in length, 14.85 feet (4.53 m) in width at the center-line, and weighed approximately 20 tons. Each boat required two and a half million reeds, which were harvested from the shores of Lake Titicaca, a high-altitude lake located on the border of Bolivia and Peru, where the totora reeds are abundant. To obtain the required quantity of reeds, a long cutting pole was used to cut them from small rowboats. The reeds were then bundled up into "amaros" containing about 500 reeds per bundle. These bundles were transported ashore and left to dry in the sun for two to four weeks while stacked upright. After the drying process, the reeds were collected and stored, taking precautions to protect them from rain.

The reeds, Scirpus Riparius, typically measured 0.5 inches in thickness at the base before being compressed and were six feet long. They were then fashioned into over 30 long cylinders or "chorizos", each measuring 1.5 feet (0.46 m) in diameter, forming the main bulk of the ship. The next step involved the construction of a jig that served as a mold. This was constructed with eucalyptus poles, each spaced three feet apart, running perpendicular to the hull, and supported by poles from the ground. Two smaller boats that resembled whales were built to reinforce the structure of the boat, using the same technique as for the main hull. These were placed side by side on top of the mold, and the reeds were placed on top of the "whales" until they formed two large, separate bundles.

The next phase involved the creation of the "estera" or skin of the boat, made by weaving the best quality reeds of the required length. This skin was then wrapped around the two large bundles, with a heart, or third bundle, placed in the center of the larger bundles. Two 2250-foot strands of sisal rope were then passed around one large bundle and around the heart in one-foot revolutions for the entire length, and the same was done on the other side. The rope never wrapped around the entire ship.

The subsequent phase of the vessel construction process involves gradually tightening the ropes using a pulley system. Two long continuous ropes, with a length of 2,250 feet each, are utilized to pull the boat until it becomes taut. This is accomplished by pulling the ropes around thirty times on each side, resulting in the boat's gradual reduction in size. This process creates two large bundles linked together by a heart, forming a stable, almost double-hulled vessel. The subsequent step entails building up the bow and stern using tapered cones of reeds, which are wedged together to form a high bow and double stern. The double stern provides additional stability and carrying capacity while at sea.

The final step in hull construction is attaching the two large bundles that form the gunnels or "sawi." Rope is wound around each gunnel and passed through each main bundle rope along the length of the ship. This is where the rigging will be attached, and the gunnels help break the larger waves.

After the hull is complete, the vessel's remainder is constructed by the crew and volunteers. Two bipod masts are positioned on either side of a bamboo cabin for Viracocha I, and a smaller mast is used further aft for the Viracocha II. The masts are held in place by "shoes" that are roped into the bundles. Two rudder oars are lashed to a steering platform placed above and to the rear of the bamboo cabin. The ship is rigged with natural fiber sisal rope, the same rope that holds the reed bundles together. Two center boards are positioned in the slide boxes placed in the fore and aft of the ship, aiding in tacking into the wind. Several lee-boards are placed on the lee-side of the ship and are removable. For the first journey, two cotton lateen sails are hand-sewn, while five sails are used for the second.

== The Viracocha III Expedition ==
Fifteen years later, the Viracocha III reed raft was to attempt the complete crossing of the Pacific in February 2018. but the launch date was postponed for technical reasons. The expedition intended to follow the path of the Kon-Tiki Viracocha people and their impulse to follow the setting sun and desire to spread the seeds of civilization ever westward. Like the Virachocha I the Viracocha III was scheduled to sail from Arica, Chile, to Mangareva, in French Polynesia, and from there attempt to island-hop to Australia. As recounted by YouTuber Maks Ukraniets who recorded the entire expedition in his video, the journey ended after 109 days when the crew had to abandon ship 85 miles from Tahiti, when they were rescued by a passing cargo boat.
