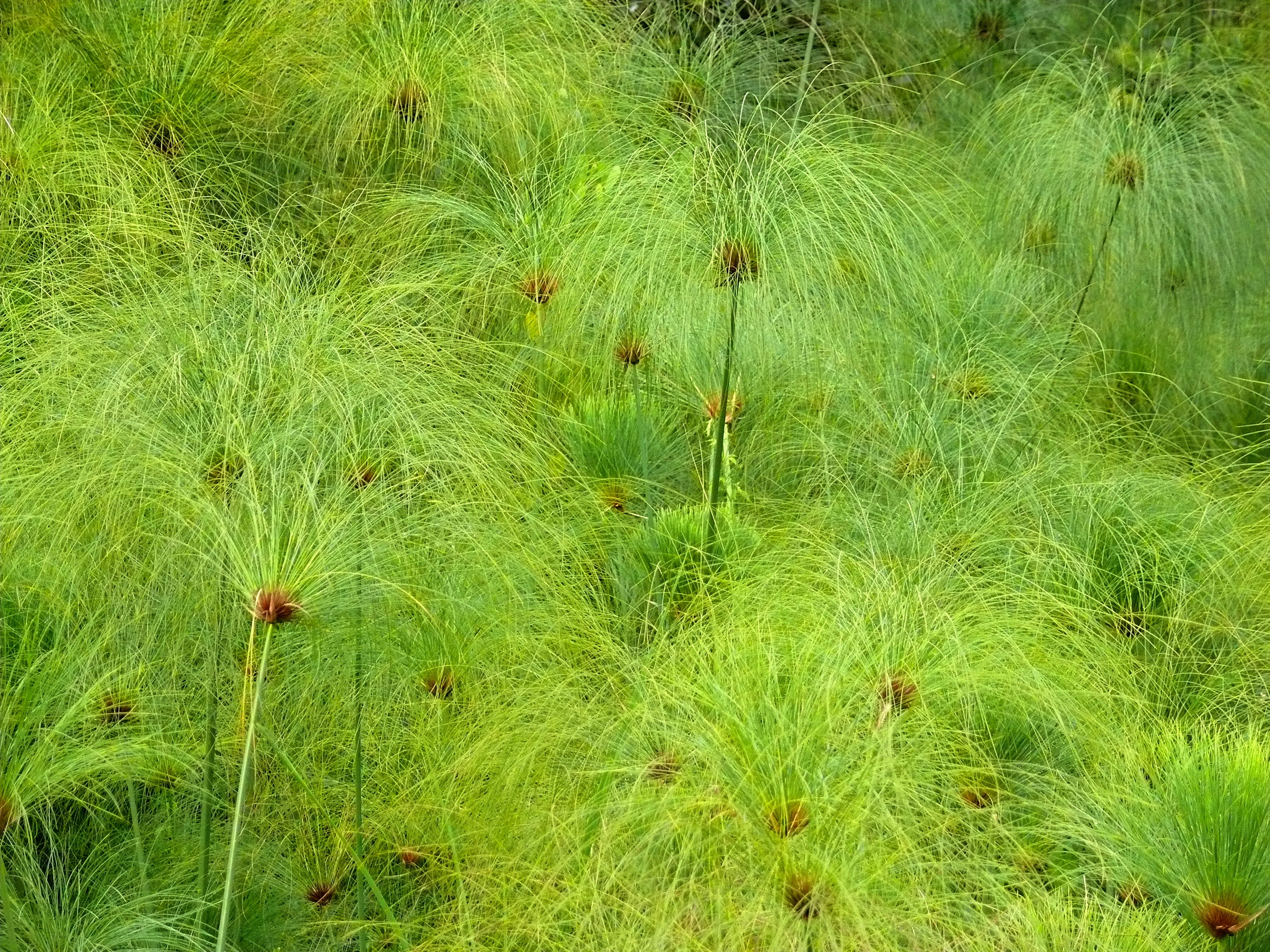
- Cyperus papyrus in Bigodi Wetland Sanctuary, Uganda

Conservation status
- Least Concern (IUCN 3.1)

Scientific classification
- Kingdom: Plantae
- Clade: Tracheophytes
- Clade: Angiosperms
- Clade: Monocots
- Clade: Commelinids
- Order: Poales
- Family: Cyperaceae
- Genus: Cyperus
- Species: C. papyrus

Binomial name
- Cyperus papyrus L.

= Cyperus papyrus =

Species of flowering plant in the sedge family

Cyperus papyrus, better known by the common names papyrus sedge, papyrus, paper reed, Indian matting plant, or Nile grass, is a species of aquatic flowering plant belonging to the sedge family Cyperaceae. It is a tender herbaceous perennial, forming tall stands of reed-like swamp vegetation in shallow water.

In nature, it grows in full sun, in flooded swamps, and on lake margins throughout Africa (where it is native), Madagascar, and the Mediterranean region. It has been introduced to tropical regions worldwide, such as the Indian subcontinent, South America, and the Caribbean.

Along with its close relatives, papyrus sedge has a very long history of use by humans, notably by the Ancient Egyptians (as it is the source of papyrus paper, one of the first types of paper ever made). Parts of the plant can be eaten, and the highly buoyant stems can be made into boats. It is now often cultivated as an ornamental plant.

== Description ==
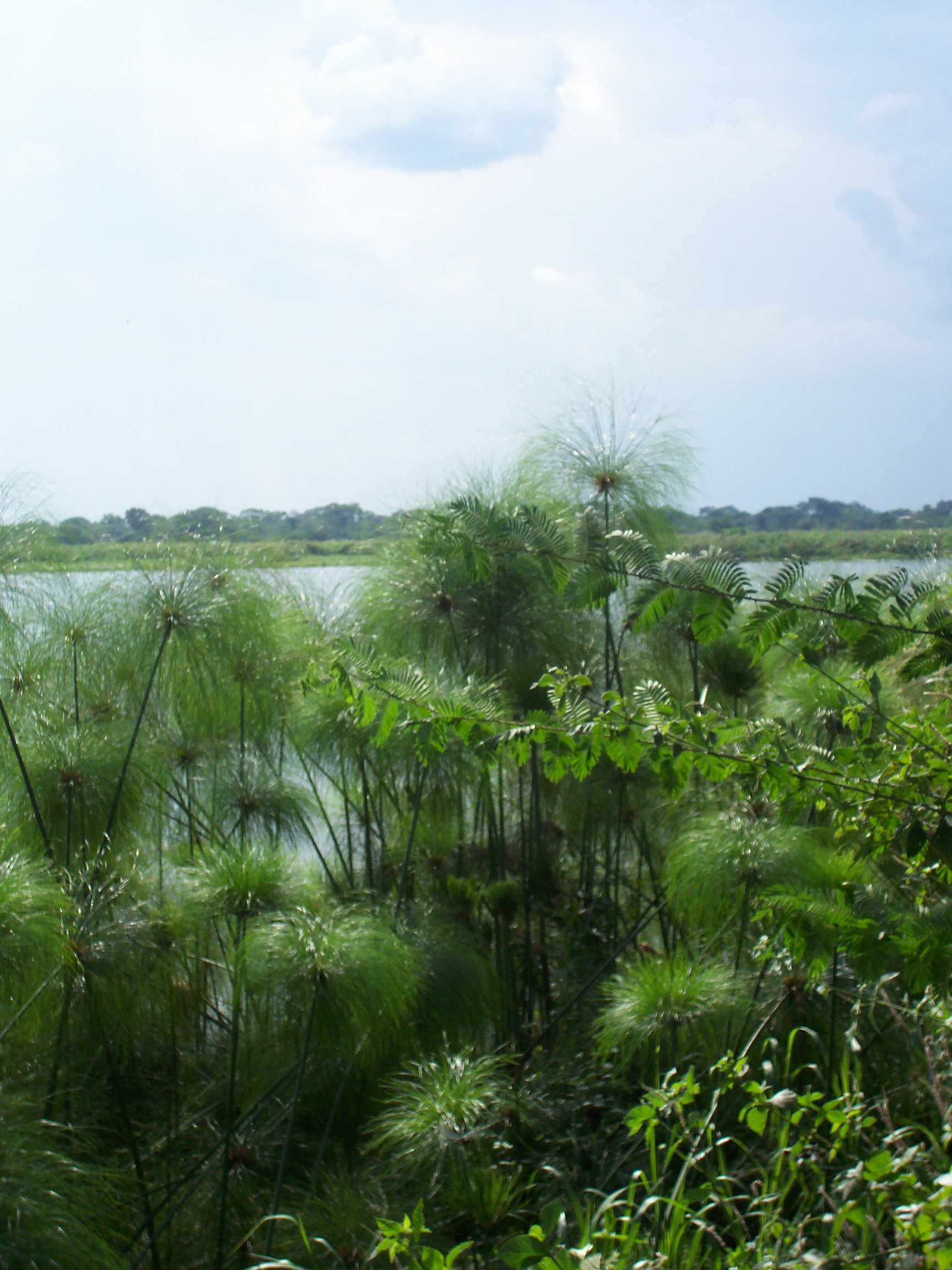
Papyrus growing wild on the banks of the Nile in Uganda

This tall, robust aquatic plant can grow 4 to 5 metres (13 to 16 ft) high, but on the margins of high altitude lakes, papyrus culms can measure up to 10 m (33 ft) tall. It forms a grass-like clump of triangular green stems that rise up from thick, woody rhizomes. Each stem is topped by a dense cluster of thin, bright green, thread-like rays around 10 to 30 cm (4 to 10 in) in length, resembling a feather duster when the plant is young. Greenish-brown flower clusters eventually appear at the ends of the rays, giving way to brown, nut-like fruit.

Although no leaves are apparent above the soil line, the younger parts of the rhizome are covered by red-brown, papery, triangular scales, which also cover the base of the culms. Technically, these are reduced leaves.

Three subspecies are accepted:

- Cyperus papyrus subsp. madagascariensis (Willd.) Kük. – Madagascar
- Cyperus papyrus subsp. papyrus – throughout the species range, except for Madagascar (where subsp. madagascariensis) and the southwestern part of the range (where subsp. zairensis)
- Cyperus papyrus subsp. zairensis (Chiov.) Kük. – Angola, Congo, DR Congo

== Ecology ==
Papyrus is a C4 sedge that forms highly productive monotypic stands over large areas of wetland in Africa. It can be found in tropical rain forests, and in permanent swamps (including lake and river margins) in savanna areas, of Africa. It grows in annual temperatures of 20 to 30 °C (68 to 86 °F) and a soil pH of 6.0 to 8.5. It flowers during the warm growth season which may be all year round where water is always available, or, in wet and dry season climates, in the rainy to early dry season. It grows in waterlogged soil and water up to 2 m deep, though sections may break off and float in deeper water. It prefers full sun to partly shady conditions. Like most tropical plants, it is sensitive to frost, but will tolerate a few degrees of frost if its rhizomes are not exposed.

In deeper swamps (1–2 m), it is the chief constituent of the floating, tangled masses of vegetation known as sudd. In some places such as Bangweulu it forms floating islands on which fishermen may set up temporary camps, and which also provide refuges for antelope and birds. It also occurs in Madagascar, and some Mediterranean areas such as Sicily and the Levant. It has become rare in the Nile Delta due to exploitation of its habitat by humans and cattle.

The "feather-duster" flowering heads make ideal nesting sites for many social species of birds. As in most sedges, pollination is by wind, not insects, and the mature fruit after release are distributed by water.

== Cultivation ==
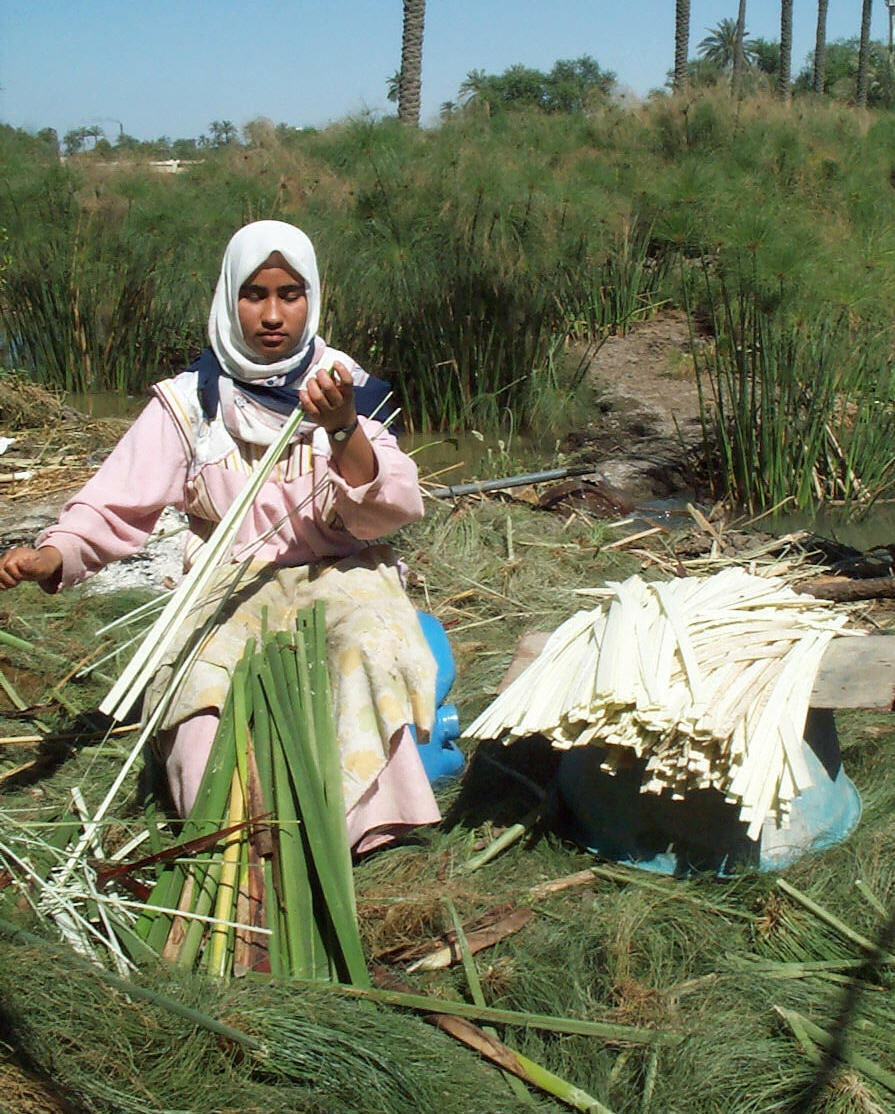
Egyptian girl harvesting papyrus in the Nile Delta

The papyrus plant is relatively easy to grow from seed, though in Egypt, it is more common to split the rootstock, and grows quite fast once established. Extremely moist soil or roots sunken in the water is preferred and the plant can flower all year long. Vegetative propagation is the suggested process of creating new plants. It is done by splitting the rhizomes into small groups and planting normally. C. papyrus is considered to be hardy in USDA hardiness zones 9 and 10.

In the United States, it has become invasive in Florida and has escaped from cultivation in Louisiana, California, and Hawaii.

The species as a whole, and the dwarf cultivar C. papyrus 'Nanus' have gained the Royal Horticultural Society's Award of Garden Merit (confirmed 2017).

== Papyrus in history ==
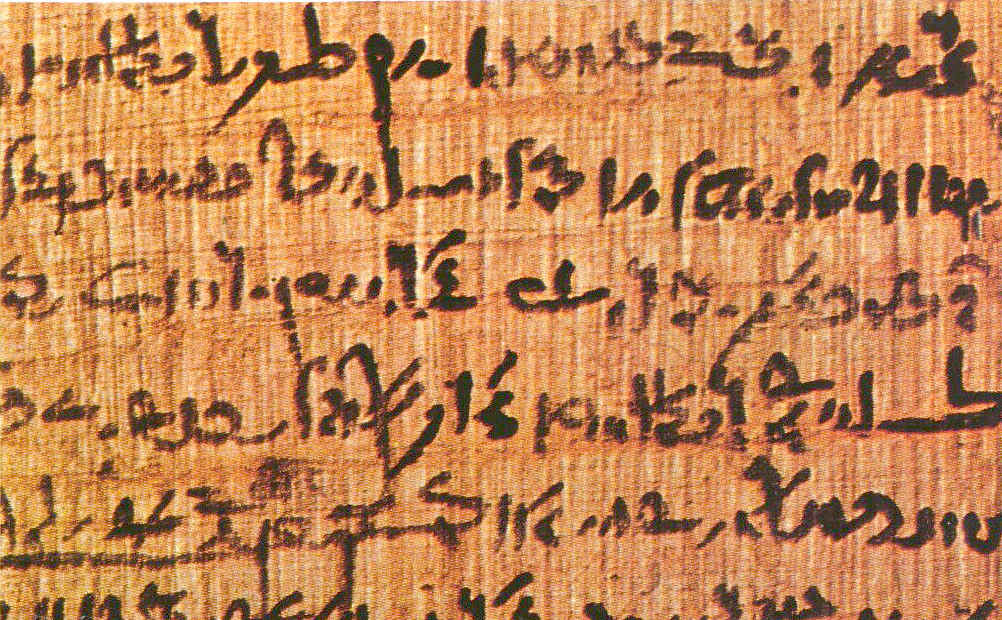
Papyrus paper

In Ancient Egypt, papyrus was used for various purposes such as baskets, sandals, blankets, medicine, incense, and boats. The woody root was used to make bowls and utensils, and was burned for fuel. The Papyrus Ebers refers to the use of soft papyrus tampons by Egyptian women in the 15th century BC. Egyptians made efficient use of all parts of the plant. Papyrus was an important "gift of the Nile" which is still preserved and perpetuated in Egyptian culture.

Egyptians used the plant for many purposes, including for making papyrus paper. Its name has an uncertain origin, but was rendered in Hellenistic Greek as πάπυρος.

In the Nile Delta, Cyperus papyrus was widely cultivated in ancient times. It is for example depicted on a restored stucco fragment from the palace of Amenhotep III near the present-day village of Malkata. Currently, only a small population remains in Egypt, in Wadi El Natrun. Theophrastus's History of Plants (Book iv. 10) states that it grew in Syria, and according to Pliny's Natural History, it was also a native plant of the Niger River and the Euphrates. Neither the explorer Peter Forsskål, an apostle of Carl Linnaeus, in the 18th century, nor the Napoleonic expedition saw it in the delta.

Aside from papyrus, several other members of the genus Cyperus may also have been involved in the multiple uses Egyptians found for the plant. Its flowering heads were linked to make garlands for the gods in gratitude. The pith of young shoots was eaten both cooked and raw. Its woody root made bowls and other utensils and was burned for fuel. From the stems were made reed boats (seen in bas-reliefs of the Fourth Dynasty showing men cutting papyrus to build a boat; similar boats are still made in southern Sudan), sails, mats, cloth, cordage, and sandals. Theophrastus states that King Antigonus made the rigging of his fleet of papyrus, an old practice illustrated by the ship's cable, wherewith the doors were fastened when Odysseus slew the suitors in his hall (Odyssey xxi. 390).

The adventurer Thor Heyerdahl had a boat built for him of papyrus, Ra, in an attempt to demonstrate that ancient African or Mediterranean people could have reached America. He was unsuccessful with this boat.

Fishermen in the Okavango Delta use small sections of the stem as floats for their nets.
