= Platou =

Platou may refer to:

- Carl Nicolai Stoud Platou (1809–1888), Norwegian civil servant and politician
- Carl Platou (1885–1956), Norwegian civil servant and politician
- Christian Emil Stoud Platou (1861–1923), Norwegian railroad director and politician for the Conservative Party
- Erling Platou (1896–1958), American pediatrician at the University of Minnesota Medical Center
- F. S. Platou (1903–1980), Norwegian architect
- Frederik Christian Stoud Platou (1811–1891), Norwegian legal scholar, Supreme Court justice, district stipendiary magistrate and politician
- Gabriel Andreas Stoud Platou (1858–1911), Norwegian banker and politician for the Conservative Party
- Harald Platou (1877–1946), Norwegian lawyer and fencer
- Karen Platou (1879–1950), Norwegian businesswoman and a politician for the Conservative Party
- Lars Hannibal Sommerfeldt Stoud Platou (1848–1923), Norwegian psychiatrist
- Lars T. Platou (1920–2003), Norwegian electrical engineer and politician for the Conservative Party
- Ludvig Stoud Platou (1778–1833), Danish-Norwegian educator, historical and geographical writer, politician and State Secretary
- Oscar Ludvig Stoud Platou (1845–1929), Norwegian jurist
- Ragnar Stoud Platou (1897–1979), Norwegian ship broker
- Theodor Platou (1892–1969), Norwegian businessperson in the brewery industry
- Valborg Stoud Platou (1881–1960), Norwegian judge and attorney
- Waldemar Stoud Platou (1868–1930), Norwegian businessperson
- Peter Platou Stabell (1908–1992), Norwegian barrister
- Anders Platou Wyller (1903–1940), Norwegian philologist and humanist

== See also ==
- Plat
- Plato
- Platyomus
