= Torgersen =

Torgersen is a surname. Notable people with the surname include:

- Alek Torgersen (born 1995), American football player
- Brad R. Torgersen (born 1974), American sci-fi author and military veteran
- Einar Torgersen (1886–1946), Norwegian sailor who competed in the 1920 Summer Olympics
- Fredrik Fasting Torgersen (1934–2015), Norwegian convicted of murder
- Hans Torgersen (1926–2015), Norwegian politician for the Christian Democratic Party
- John Torgersen (1878–1958), Norwegian businessperson and politician
- Jon Fredrik "Joffe" Torgersen, singer in Delaware (band), a Norwegian indie/alternative rock band
- Knut Petter Torgersen (born 1955), Norwegian politician
- Otto Torgersen (1910–2000), Norwegian architect, born in Trondheim
- Paul Torgersen (1931–2015), President of Virginia Polytechnic Institute and State University
- Rolf Normann Torgersen (1918–2010), Norwegian jurist and civil servant
- Sjur Torgersen (1946–2005), Norwegian Ambassador and diplomat
- Tore Torgersen (born 1968), Norwegian ten-pin bowler

== See also ==
- Torgersen Island, small island in the Palmer Archipelago of Antarctica
- Thoresen
- Torgsin
- Torsen
