= Valborg (name) =

Valborg is a feminine given name. Notable people with the name include:

== Given name ==
- Valborg Aulin (1860–1928), Swedish pianist and composer
- Valborg Borchsenius (1872–1949), Danish ballet dancer
- Valborg Christensen (1917–2003), Danish swimmer
- Valborg Eriksdotter (1545–1580), royal mistress of Magnus, Duke of Östergötland
- Valborg Fleming (died after 1542), Finnish abbess
- Valborg Florström (1878–1956), Finnish diver
- Valborg Hammerich (1897–1988), Danish philanthropist
- Valborg Innamaa (before 1550–c. 1602), Finnish merchant and ship owner
- Valborg Lerche (1873–1931), Norwegian social worker
- Valborg Lindahl, Swedish figure skater
- Valborg Madslien, Norwegian ski-orienteer
- Valborg Olander (1861–1943, Stockholm), Swedish teacher, politician and suffragette
- Valborg Seeberg (1851–1929), Norwegian author
- Valborg Stoud Platou (1881–1960), Norwegian judge and attorney
- Valborg Svensson (1903–1983), Swedish politician and journalist
- Valborg Werbeck-Svärdström (1879–1972), Swedish singer

== Middle name ==
- Aud Valborg Tønnessen (born 1964), Norwegian Lutheran theologian and church historian
- Dagny Valborg Carlsson (1912–2022), Swedish blogger and influencer

== Fictional characters ==
- Valborg, main character in the Danish tragedy by Adam Oehlenschläger entitled Axel and Valborg
