= Theodor Platou =

Norwegian businessperson in the brewery industry

- Born: 4 September 1892; Bergen, Norway
- Died: 18 October 1969 (aged 77)
- Occupation: Businessperson
- Parent: Waldemar Stoud Platou
- Relatives: Gabriel Andreas Stoud Platou (uncle); Christian Emil Stoud Platou (uncle)
- Awards: Order of St. Olav (1938); Order of the Dannebrog; Haakon VII 70th Anniversary Medal; King's Medal of Merit in gold

Theodor Platou (4 September 1892 – 18 October 1969) was a Norwegian businessperson in the brewery industry.

Platou was born in Bergen to brewer Waldemar Stoud Platou and Hilda Oppegaard. He was manager of Hansa Brewery from 1916 to 1919. From 1924 to 1962 he was CEO of Frydenlunds bryggeri in Oslo, and also chairman of the board of the brewery from 1930 to 1960. During the German occupation of Norway Platou served with the Norwegian Brigade in Scotland. Platou was decorated as a Knight, First Class of the Order of St. Olav in 1938, and was a Knight of the Order of the Dannebrog. He was awarded the Haakon VII 70th Anniversary Medal and the King's Medal of Merit in gold.
