= Lars T. Platou =

Norwegian electrical engineer and politician

Lars Tokstad Sem Platou (2 July 1920 – 30 May 2003) was a Norwegian electrical engineer and politician for the Conservative Party. He served three terms in the Norwegian Parliament, was the deputy leader of his party from 1972 to 1978. After his political career he became chair of Vinmonopolet.

== Personal life ==
He was born in Stavanger as a son of Fridthjof Fredrik Sem Platou (1894–1965) and Johanne Marie Tokstad (1898–1980). He was a grandnephew of Gabriel Andreas Stoud Platou, Waldemar Stoud Platou and Christian Emil Stoud Platou, and a first cousin once removed of Karen, Ragnar and Frithjof Stoud Platou.

== Career ==
He enrolled as a student at the Norwegian Institute of Technology in 1939, and graduated as civil engineer in electronics in 1946. From 1945 to 1946 he worked as an assistant in mathematics at the Institute of Technology. He was employed as an electrical engineer in the Hamar-based company Elektrobygg from 1948 to 1975, also maintained a farm in Veldre from 1941 to 1982.

As a farmer, he was the regional leader of the Norwegian Agrarian Association from 1956 to 1958. He was also involved in local politics in Ringsaker Municipality as a municipal council member from 1951 to 1967; during the last two terms he was a member of the executive committee. From 1963 to 1967 he was a member of Hedmark county council. He chaired the Conservative Party chapter in Hedmark county from 1950 to 1960, and was also a member of its national board from 1950 to 1965. In 1965 he became a member of its central committee. He served as second deputy leader of the party from 1970 to 1972, and deputy leader from 1972 to 1978.

He was elected to the Norwegian Parliament from Hedmark in 1965, and was re-elected on two occasions. He had previously served in the position of deputy representative during the terms 1954–1957 and 1958–1961. During his first parliamentary term, he was a member of the Standing Committee on Local Government. In his next two terms, he was a member of the Standing Committee on Finance (chairing it from 1969 to 1973) and a deputy member of the Enlarged Committee on Foreign Affairs.

Outside of representative government, Platou was involved in the administration of Vinmonopolet from 1950, finally serving as chair from 1981 to 1987. He was also board chairman of the newspaper Hamar Stiftstidende 1952 to 1968, Kreditkassen from 1978 to 1990, Skibladner from 1974 to 1982 and Raufoss Ammunisjonsfabrikker from 1985 to 1988. He was a deputy board member of the Norwegian State Housing Bank from 1966 to 1970.

Platou was decorated with the Defence Medal 1940–1945 and the HM The King's Medal of Merit in gold. He died in 2003.
