= Nilssen =

Nilssen is a surname of Norwegian origin. The name may refer to:

- Asbjørn Nilssen (1875–1958), Norwegian Nordic skier
- Åse Wisløff Nilssen (born 1945), Norwegian politician; served two terms in the Storting
- Jens R. Nilssen (1880–1964), Norwegian illustrator
- Magnus Nilssen (1871–1947), Norwegian politician; Minister of Labor 1928
- Paal Nilssen-Love (born 1974), Norwegian jazz drummer
- Rolf Nilssen (1928–2012), Norwegian politician; served three terms in the Storting
- Rune Nilssen (born 1975), Norwegian professional football player
