= Lumholtz =

Lumholtz may refer to:

== Places ==
- Lumholtz, Queensland, a locality in the Cassowary Coast Region, Australia

== People with the surname ==
- Carl Sofus Lumholtz (1851–1922), Norwegian explorer and ethnographer, particularly indigenous cultures of Australia and Mesoamerican central Mexico
- Nicolai Lumholtz (1729–1819), Danish-Norwegian bishop

== See also ==
- Lumholtz's tree-kangaroo (Dendrolagus lumholtzi) is a heavy-bodied tree-kangaroo found in rain forests of the Atherton Tableland Region of Queensland
