= Frederik Christian Stoud Platou =

Norwegian legal scholar, justice, district stipendiary magistrate and politician

Frederik Christian Stoud Platou (17 February 1811 – 23 June 1891) was a Norwegian legal scholar, Supreme Court justice, district stipendiary magistrate and politician.

== Personal life ==
He was born in Christiania as a son of educator, professor, politician and State Secretary Ludvig Stoud Platou (1749–1815) and his wife Karen Lumholtz (1785–1833). He was a maternal grandson of Nicolai Lumholtz and brother of Carl Nicolai Stoud Platou, and through the latter an uncle of Valborg Platou and Lars Hannibal Sommerfeldt Stoud Platou. He was a granduncle of Carl Platou.

In July 1844 in Kråkstad he married the vicar's daughter, Constance Henriette Reiersen (1820–1893). They had a son, Oscar Ludvig Stoud Platou, and their daughter Mimi married Lars Hannibal Sommerfeldt Stoud Platou.

== Career ==
He graduated from the university with the cand.jur. degree in 1839. In 1842 he started holding lectures at the university, and in the same year, when Ulrik Anton Motzfeldt became a Supreme Court Assessor, Platou was hired as a lecturer of jurisprudence from June 1843. In 1849 he was promoted to professor, although there was a vote of dissent in the government—some wanted Frans Christian Faye to advance from lecturer to professor of medicine instead. The dissent went to the Parliament of Norway in 1851, but no change was made. He published little; only one noteworthy book, Om Besiddelse efter norsk Ret ("On Possession after Norwegian Law") in 1863. He also participated in ad hoc law commissions. In 1877 he received an honorary degree at Uppsala University.

From 1862 to 1864 he was a Supreme Court Assessor, but after 1864 he was only extraordinary Assessor in some cases at the same time as being district stipendiary magistrate in Nes District Court. His son Oscar was deputy judge here from 1870 to 1871. Platou was acting Auditor General of Norway from 1873 to 1874, and participated as Minister of Auditing in three interim governments: first during King Oscar II's travel in Germany from May to June 1875; then during King Oscar II's travel in Russia in July 1875; then during the King's and the Crown Prince's travel in Russia in September 1881. Christian Selmer was also a part of the first two of these interim governments.

In 1883–1884 Platou was an acting Supreme Court Assessor, and was a part of the Impeachment case against Selmer's Cabinet. Together with the other assessors he voted against the impeachment of Selmer and the entire cabinet, and as such he lost the case.

After 1884 he worked in the high court of the Diocese of Kristiania, where he was transferred because his hearing was deteriorating. He died in June 1891 in Kristiania.
