= Alf Staver =

Norwegian politician

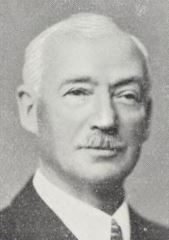
Alf Staver

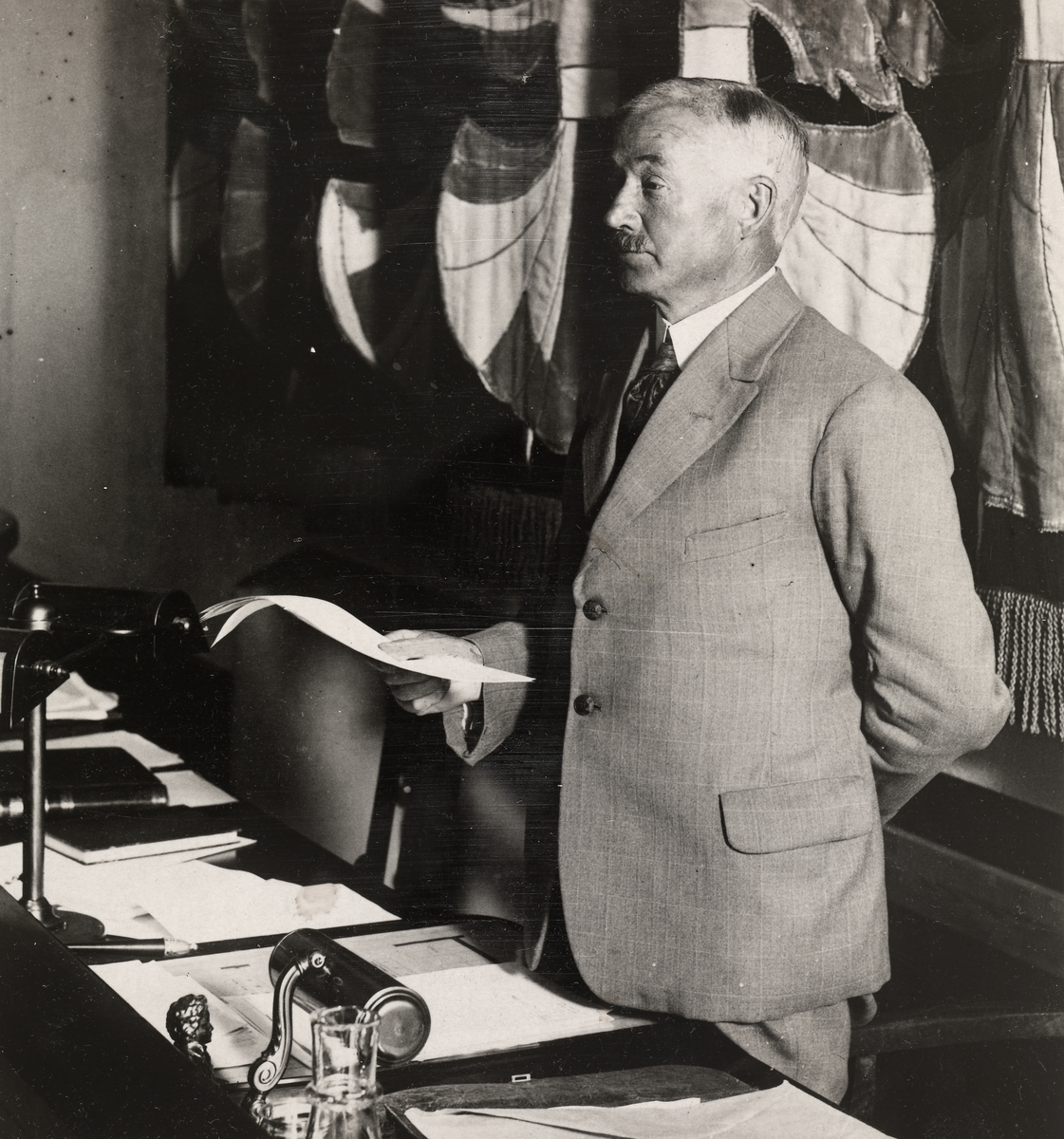
Alf Staver

Alf Staver (20 March 1874 – 1953) was a Norwegian skier, sports official, educator and politician for the Conservative Party.

He was born at Staver in Bærum as a son of farmers Christoffer Staver (1843–1929) and Maren Sørine Tanum (1848–1929). He was both a first cousin and brother-in-law of farmer and mayor Olaf Bryn. He finished his secondary education in 1894, finished training as a conscript officer in 1895, took a teacher's examination in 1896 and the Central School of Gymnastics in 1899. From 1898 to 1915 he was a teacher at Kristiania borger- og realskole, and from 1915 to 1944 at Fagerborg School. In the armed forces, he reached the ranks of Premier Lieutenant in 1902 and Captain in 1911.

He was a member of Bærum municipal council from 1913 to 1928, serving the last three years as mayor and the years 1922 to 1925 as deputy mayor. He returned to Bærum municipal council for two more terms from 1934 to 1940. He was also a member of the school board, the Drammen Line supervisory board and numerous other councils. He was elected to the Parliament of Norway in 1930 from the constituency Akershus, but only served as a deputy representative during the next term; 1934–1936.

Staver was an active Nordic combined skier during his youth. His first prize was a sixth prize in ski jumping in Solbergbakken in 1888. In 1893 he won the ski jumping contest in Solbergbakken, and in 1894 he won the ski jump for youth in the Holmenkollen ski festival. In the national competitions he took fourth places in Drammen and Solbergrennet in 1896, and a third place in Nydalsrennet in 1899. He chaired the skiing club Bærums SK from 1900 to 1904, in 1906 and 1919 to 1920, and was a board member of the Norwegian Ski Federation from 1908 to 1911.

He was also a board member of the newspaper Asker og Bærums Budstikke after the political takeover in 1913. He chaired the development society Bærums Sogneselskap from 1930 to 1938, and received honorary membership here. He died in 1953.

Political offices
Preceded by John Torgersen	Mayor of Bærum; 1926–1928	Succeeded by Haakon Sommerfeldt
