= Ludvig Stoud Platou =

Norwegian politician

Ludvig Stoud Platou (28 March 1778 – 30 November 1833) was a Danish-Norwegian educator, historical and geographical writer, politician and State Secretary.

== Personal life ==
He was born in Slagelse, Denmark as a son of curate Friderich Christian Platou (1749–1815) and his wife Cathrine Stoud (1751–1824). They had the sons Carl Nicolai Stoud Platou and Frederik Christian Stoud Platou. Ludvig was grandfather of Lars, Valborg and Oscar Ludvig Stoud Platou, and great-grandfather of Carl Platou. He was also a granduncle of Gabriel Andreas Stoud Platou, Christian Emil Stoud Platou and Waldemar Stoud Platou.

In May 1808 in Christiania he married Karen Lumholtz (1785–1833), a daughter of dean Nicolai Lumholtz. Since the dean did not approve, the marriage was conducted clandestinely. The couple moved to Oslo Ladegård in 1820, where he died in 1833.

== Career ==
He studied at the University of Copenhagen from 1795, and was a teacher at Schouboeske Institut from 1801. In 1803 he was hired as a teacher at Christiania Cathedral School in Norway, and from 1806 to 1813 he was a schoolmaster at the same school. However, he was also involved in numerous other tasks. From 1807 to 1809 he was a part-time teacher at the Norwegian Military Academy, and from 1808 to 1814 he edited the government's magazine Budstikken. He co-founded the Royal Norwegian Society of Development in 1809, and held positions here. He published the textbook Kortfattet Jordbeskrivelse for Borger- og Almueskoler in Denmark in 1803, which was reissued several times; the seventeenth and last reissue came in 1842. While working at Christiania Cathedral School he published the books Historisk Udsigt over Norges Skiebne i den syvaarige nordiske Krig in 1808, Geographie over Fædrelandene Danmark og Norge, for Ungdommen in 1809, Haandbog i Geographien, til Brug ved Skole-Underviisning in two volumes in 1809 and 1812, and Udtog af Geographien for Begyndere in 1810. The textbook Udtog af Geographien was reissued fifteen times in Norway (the last in 1862, by his son Carl Nicolai), and published in Sweden in 1832, Iceland in 1843 and Greenland in 1848. He also served as editor of the journal Historisk-philosophiske Samlinger (1811–1813).

In 1813 he was appointed as professor of history and statistics at the Royal Frederick University in Christiania. However, he soon started working part-time at the university. In 1815 he was hired as secretary in the Fourth Ministry, and in 1817 he became acting State Secretary for Poul Christian Holst. The position is now called Secretary to the Government, and has nothing to do with the present-day State Secretary. He remained acting State Secretary until 1821, and held the position on a permanent basis from 1825 to 1833. By that time he had served as a Parliament of Norway member, representing the constituency Akershus Amt for the year 1824.

He published a Norwegian version of the Hansard, for the Norwegian Constituent Assembly, in 1814. The two-volume work was called Den Norske Rigs-Forsamlings Forhandlinger paa Eidsvold i Aaret 1814, and was published together with Georg Sverdrup and Christopher Frimann Omsen. Platou then published the works of Enevold de Falsen in 1821. Optegnelser for Aaret 1814 was published posthumously. He was a member of the Norwegian Academy of Science and Letters from 1825 to his death. He was also a Knight of the Order of the Dannebrog from 1812 and Order of the Polar Star from 1817, and Commander of the Order of Vasa from 1832.
