= Christopher Frimann Omsen =

Norwegian politician

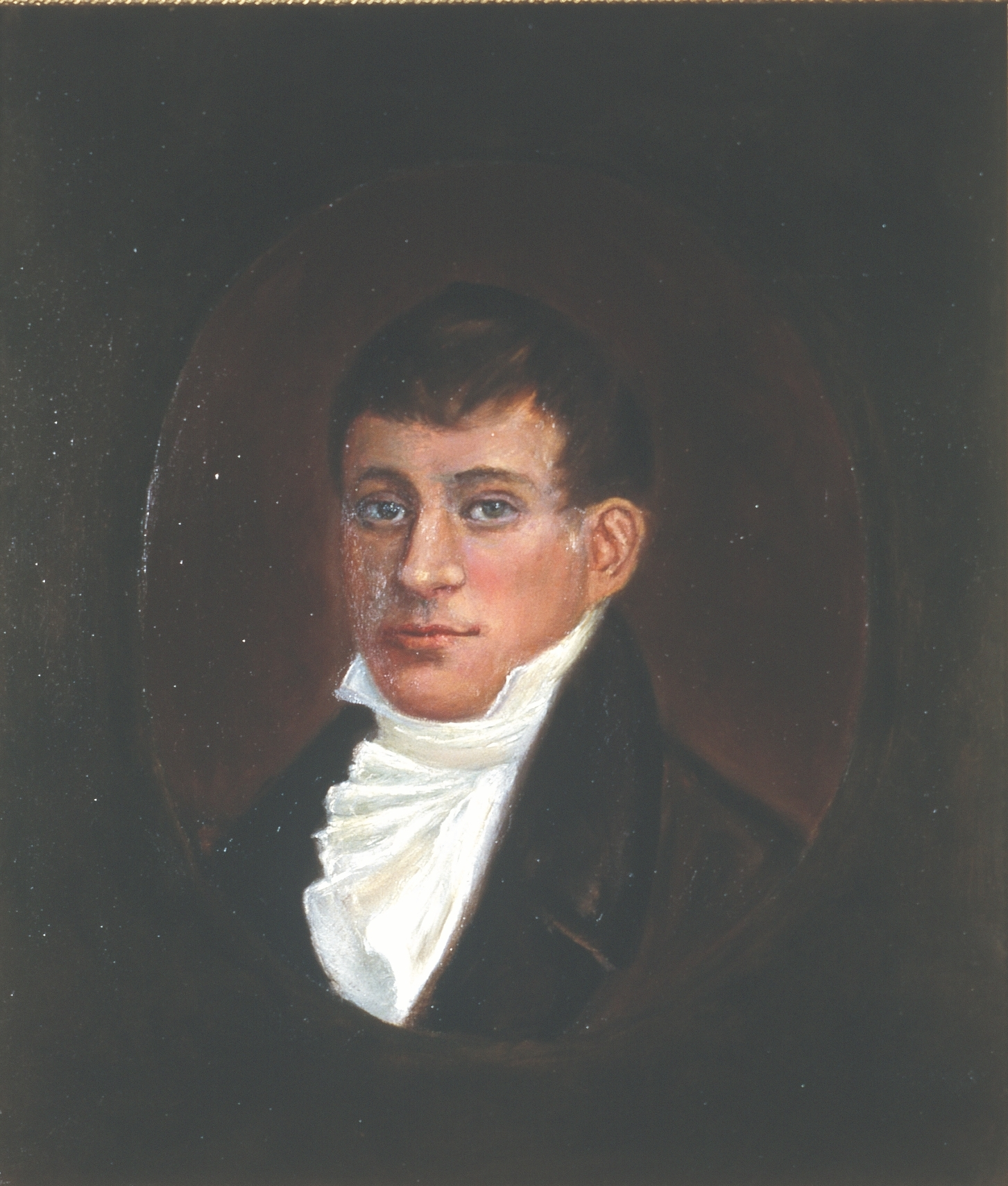
Christopher Frimann Omsen painted by Ragna Hennig-Larsen. The painting belongs to Eidsvoll 1814.

Christopher Frimann Omsen (11 December 1761 – 25 April 1829) was a Norwegian "Founding Father" and later Supreme Court Justice.

He was born in Bergen as a son of customs officer Hillebrandt Omsen (1723–1771) og Helchie Catharina Thode (1728–1775)—his parents died when he was young. He enrolled in law studies in Denmark in 1783, and graduated with a Danish law degree in 1789. In 1791 he took the cand.jur. degree. He was hired as an attorney ("procurator") in Christiania in 1791 and in Akershus in 1797. From 1799 he doubled as a prosecutor in customs matters. He married twice; the first marriage lasted from April 1792 to his wife's death in 1809, and he remarried in October 1811.

He lived in the city center until 1826, and in 1814 he was elected as Christiania's second representative to the Norwegian Constituent Assembly, where he became one of the Fathers of the Constitution of Norway. He was a member of the committee that drafted the Constitution, and especially contributed to the chapter on the judicial branch. He supported monarchy, but not the King prospect Christian Frederick, and tried on 17 May 1814 to postpone the choice of Christian Frederick as Norway's new king. This did not happen, and 17 May even became the Norwegian Constitution Day.

Later in 1814, Omsen published a Norwegian Constituent Assembly-version of the Hansard. The two-volume work was called Den Norske Rigs-Forsamlings Forhandlinger paa Eidsvold i Aaret 1814, and was published together with Georg Sverdrup and Ludvig Stoud Platou. In the same year he was given the right to be a barrister in cases in the newly established Supreme Court of Norway, and already in 1815 he was appointed as an Assessor (Supreme Court Justice). He participated in the second and the fourth Impeachment cases.

Omsen also served as a deputy representative to the Parliament of Norway in 1815, and on the board of the Office of the Auditor General of Norway from 1818 to 1824. He lived at the farm Nedre Blindern in Aker from 1826, and died in April 1829 in Aker.
