= Olaf Tandberg =

Norwegian doctor and Nordic skier

Personal information
- Nationality: Norway
- Born: 7 July 1879 Askim, Norway
- Died: 15 June 1932 (aged 52) Lillehammer, Norway

Sport
- Sport: Skiing
- Club: Frigg Ski Club; Lillehammer Ski Club

Achievements and titles
- Personal bests: 35.5 m (116 ft); Bærum, Norway (11 February 1900)

Olaf Tandberg (7 July 1879 – 15 June 1932) was a Norwegian doctor and Nordic skier.

== Career ==
On 11 February 1900 he set the ski jumping world record distance 35.5 metres (116 ft) at Solbergbakken hill in Bærum, Norway.

A year later he won the Nordic combined event at Holmenkollen and won the royal trophy. In later years he was a ski jumping judge in Holmenkollen between 1918 and 1930.

== Ski jumping world record ==
Set on the first ever official ski jumping competition.

| Date | Hill | Location | Metres | Feet |
|---|---|---|---|---|
| 11 February 1900 | Solbergbakken | Bærum, Norway | 35.5 | 116 |
