= Lars Platou =

Norwegian psychiatrist (1848–1923)

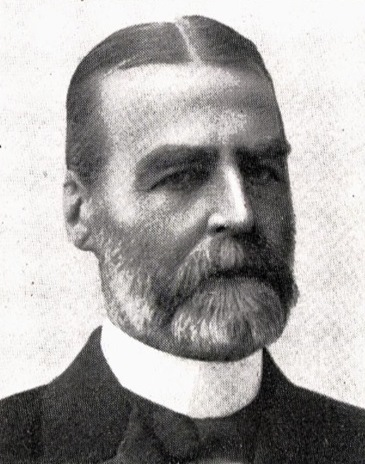
- Lars Hannibal Sommerfeldt Stoud Platou
- Born: 2 September 1848; Bergen, Norway
- Died: 12 November 1923 (aged 75); Kristiania, Norway
- Education: Cand.med.
- Occupation: Psychiatrist

Lars Hannibal Sommerfeldt Stoud Platou (2 September 1848 – 12 November 1923) was a Norwegian psychiatrist.

== Biography ==
He was born in Bergen as a son of burgomaster Carl Nicolai Stoud Platou (1809–1888) and his wife Christence Dorothea Plade Nielsen (1817–1889). He was a grandson of Ludvig Stoud Platou, nephew of Frederik Christian Stoud Platou, brother of Valborg Platou, first cousin of Oscar Ludvig Stoud Platou, second cousin of Gabriel Andreas Stoud Platou, Christian Emil Stoud Platou and Waldemar Stoud Platou and uncle of Carl Platou. In September 1878, in Ullensaker, he married his first cousin (a daughter of Frederik Christian Stoud Platou), Mimi Platou (1852–1928).

He enrolled in higher education, and graduated with the cand.med. degree in 1874. He was acting district physician in Inner Romsdal and worked some time as Rikshospitalet before becoming manager of Rosenborg "insane asylum" in 1786. He worked at Gaustad asylum from 1881 to 1882, and was the director of E.g. asylum from 1882 to 1920. He succeeded Axel H. Lindboe. E.g. was the third state-run asylum in Norway, and with 38 years as director he made his mark there. He died in November 1923 in Kristiania.
