= F. S. Platou =

Norwegian architect

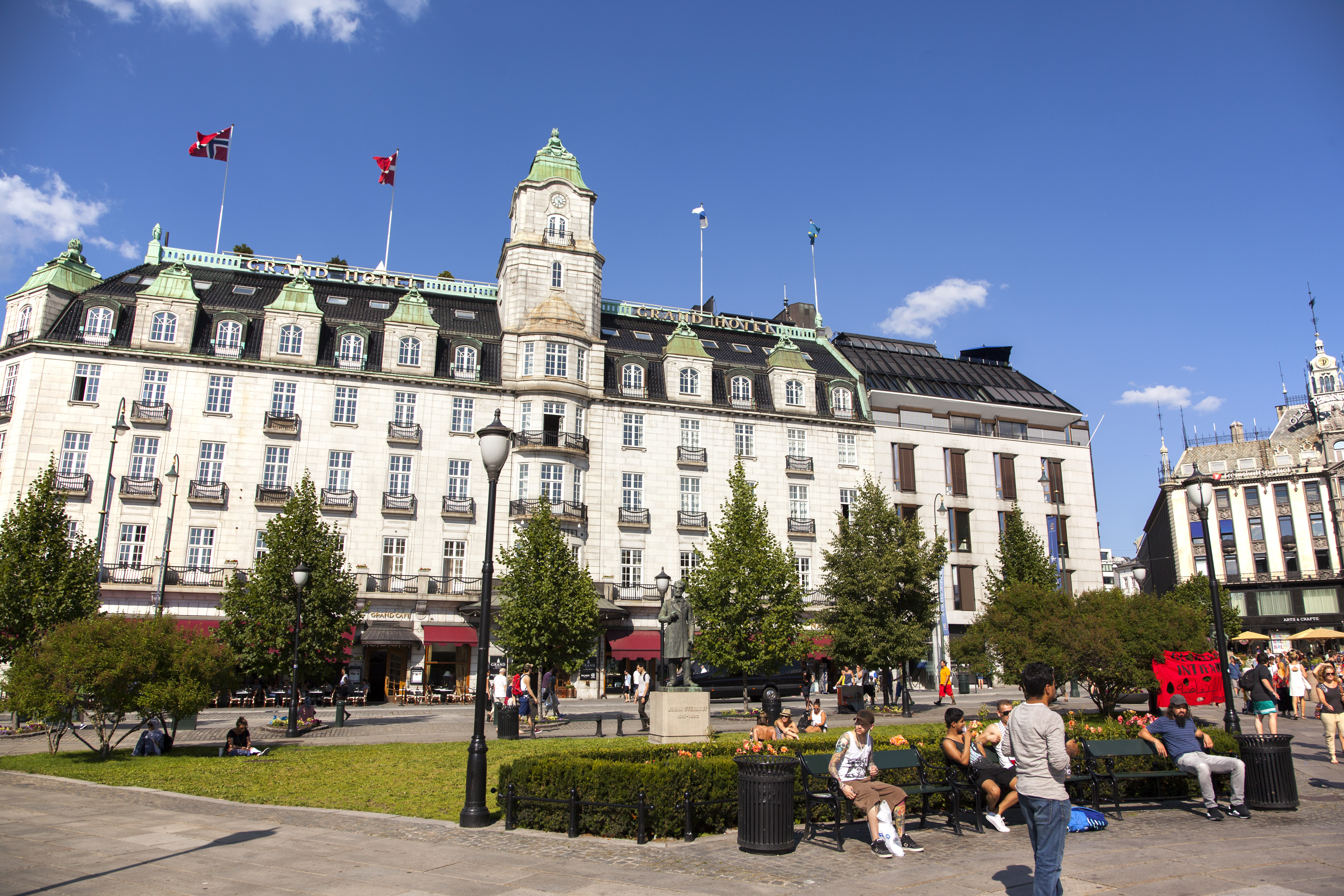
The Grand Hotel in Oslo, which was reconstructed by Platou in 1958

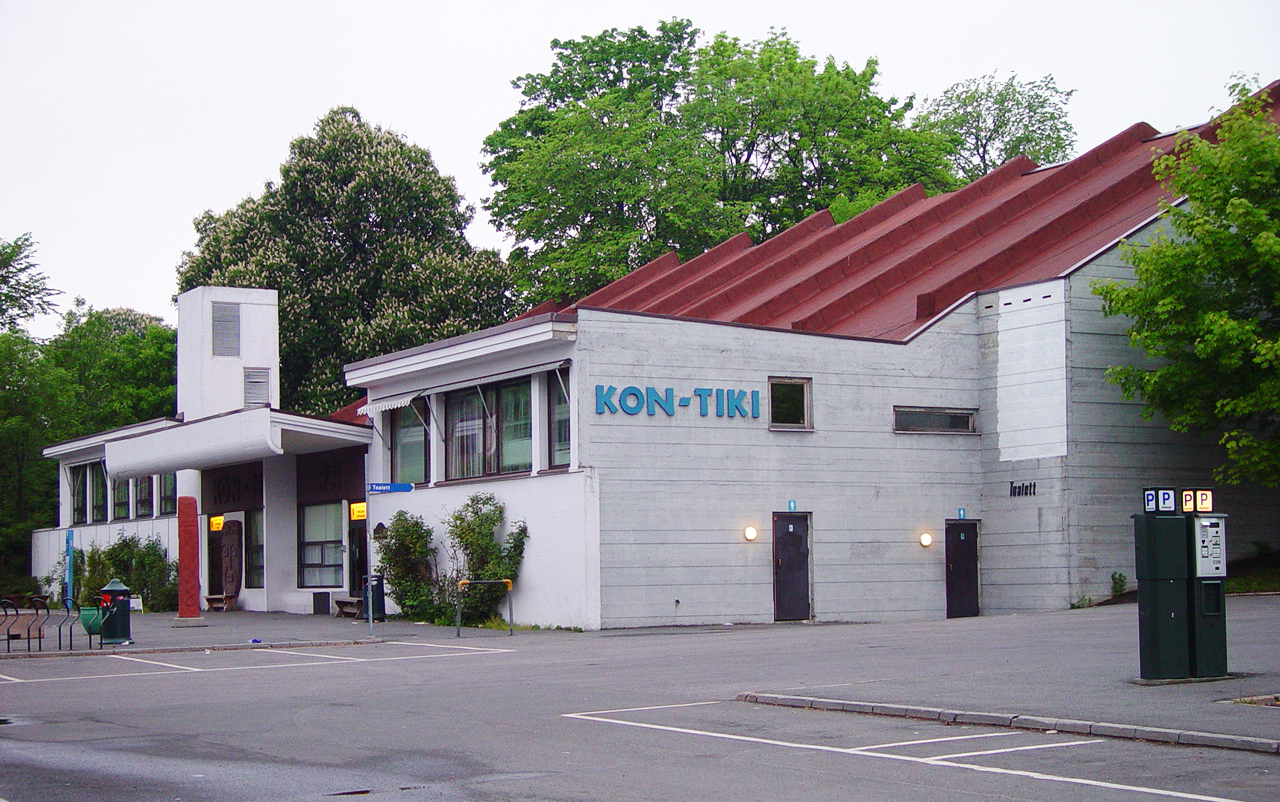
The Kon-Tiki Museum at Bygdøy in Oslo, which was designed by F. S. Platou and Otto Torgersen in 1957

Frithjof Stoud "F. S." Platou (21 August 1903 – 12 August 1980) was a Norwegian architect. He worked for the international architects Lars Backer and Erich Mendelsohn before he established his own architectural firm in Oslo. Among his most famous works are the Grand Hotel and the Kon-Tiki Museum, both in Oslo.

== Personal life ==
Platou was born in Hamar to banker Gabriel Andreas Stoud Platou (1858–1911) and his wife, Ingeborg Sophie Falck (1864–1958). His only brother was Ragnar Stoud Platou, who later became a ship broker.

Platou was nephew of Christian Emil and Waldemar Stoud Platou, and cousin of Karen Platou.

In 1931, Platou married Aagot Jeanette Robsahm (1907–1956), a daughter of wholesaler Andreas Robsahm (1878–1949) and his wife, Aagot Manskow (1883–1970). Platou and Robsahm remained married until her death in 1956.

== Career ==
In 1921, he took an examen artium in Hamar. He thereupon travelled to Switzerland where he studied architecture at Eidgenössische Technische Hochschule Zürich from 1922 to 1926. He also studied economics in London in 1925. Lars Backer thereafter employed him as assistant in Oslo. In 1929–30, Platou was employed by Erich Mendelsohn.

In 1930, Platou started his own architectural firm, which he named after himself. The Norwegian architects Otto Torgersen and Bernt Heiberg worked in his firm, which designed various functionalist buildings in Oslo. After the Second World War, the office was expanded with more architects, who designed many banking centers and enterprise buildings in Oslo. They also designed the Kon-Tiki Museum at Bygdøy and the headquarters of the Norwegian Association of Local and Regional Authorities at Vika in the Oslo city centre. After a fire in 1957, Platou designed a new building for the Grand Hotel in Oslo the following year. In 1971, his architectural firm was converted into a limited company. For many years, the firm performed major assignments abroad.

Platou was co-founder of the engineering, architecture and design firm Norconsult, and headed the company from 1963 to 1968. He also had honoraries in some other architectural organisations in Norway. He died on 12 August 1980.
