= Gabriel Andreas Stoud Platou =

Norwegian banker and politician

Gabriel Andreas Stoud Platou (1858 – 6 June 1911) was a Norwegian banker and politician for the Conservative Party.

== Personal life ==
He was as a son of banker Christian Fredrik Stoud Platou (1824–1883), brother of Christian Emil Stoud Platou and Waldemar Stoud Platou, grandnephew of Ludvig Stoud Platou, uncle of Karen Platou and granduncle of Lars T. Platou. He was also a second cousin of Oscar, Lars and Valborg Platou.

Together with Ingeborg Sophie Falck (1864–1958) he had the sons F. S. Platou and Ragnar Stoud Platou.

== Career ==
He took over his father's bank in 1885, and was the director of Hamar Sparebank until his death. He was also a board member of Volund and Hamar Dampskibsselskab, and of the supervisory commission on railways in the county. From 1902 to 1097 he served as the mayor of Hamar. He also participated in several national elections, being a deputy member of the Parliament of Norway from 1903 to his death. He was the deputy candidate ("running mate") for Axel Thallaug in the 1906 Norwegian parliamentary election in the single-member urban constituency Lillehammer, Hamar, Gjøvik og Kongsvinger. Thallaug and Platou, who in this particular election stood for the Coalition Party, edged out Labour's candidates with 1,284 against 1,045 votes.

In the 1909 Norwegian parliamentary election Platou ran against Thallaug in Hamar. As the conservative vote was split, Platou failed to carry the vote in his hometown, but lost to Labour's Petter Nilssen with 626 against 704 votes. Platou only stood in his hometown, and Thallaug carried the three other cities in the constituency. There was thus a second round face-off between Thallaug and Nilssen, where Thallaug and his deputy Platou won comfortably. Before the end of the term, Platou contracted an illness and died in June 1911 in Kristiania.
