= Olaf Bryn =

Norwegian politician (1872–1948)

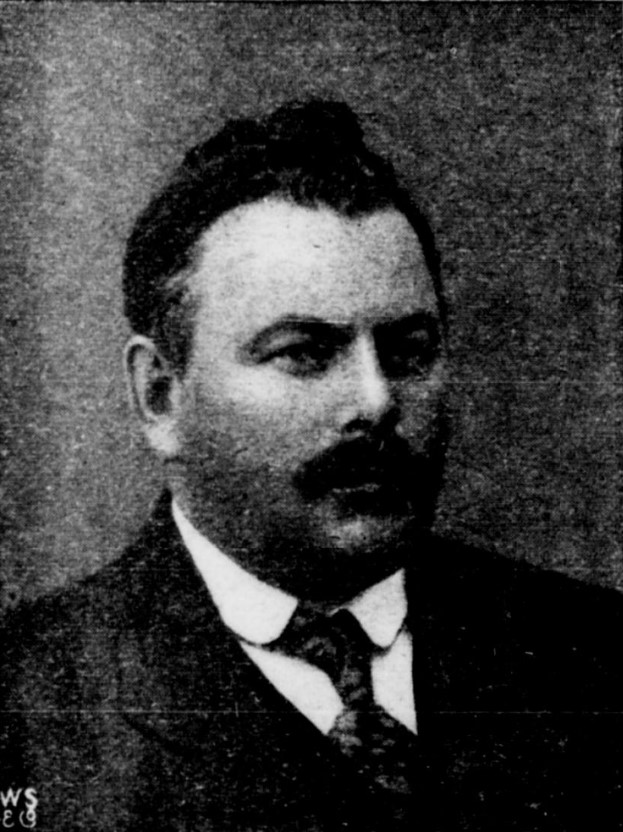

Olaf Bryn (9 June 1872 – 8 October 1948) was a Norwegian farmer and politician for the Conservative Party.

He was born in Bærum as a son of Thron Bryn (1836–1890) and his wife Karen Tanum (1846–1920). He finished middle school in 1890, and subsequently ran the farms Bryn and Rud in Western Bærum. He was a first cousin and brother-in-law of fellow politician Alf Staver.

He was a member of Bærum municipal council from 1901 to 1922, serving as deputy mayor from 1904 to 1909 and mayor from 1910 to 1916. He was later elected to the Parliament of Norway from Akershus in 1921 and 1924, and later served as a deputy representative during the term 1928–1930. As a member of the Norwegian Agrarian Association, he was one of four delegates from Bærum at the meeting in 1920 that decided to found the Agrarian Party. Three of the delegates also joined the Agrarian Party, but Bryn remained in the Conservative Party.

He was a board member of Bærums Sparebank and Østlandets Melkesentral. He was a church verger at Bryn Church for over fifty years.

Political offices
Preceded by Christian Fredrik Michelet	Mayor of Bærum; 1910–1916	Succeeded by Magnus Blikstad
