= Oscar Ludvig Stoud Platou =

Norwegian jurist and professor

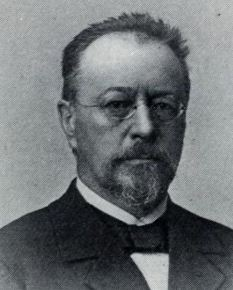
Oscar Ludvig Stoud Platou

Oscar Ludvig Stoud Platou (16 July 1845 – 17 January 1929) was a Norwegian jurist. After fourteen years as an assessor in Oslo City Court from 1876 to 1890, he was a professor at the Royal Frederick University from 1890 to 1920.

== Personal life ==
He was born in Christiania as the son of Frederik Christian Stoud Platou (1811–1891). and his wife Constance Henriette Reiersen (1820–1893). He was a grandson of Ludvig Stoud Platou, nephew of Carl Nicolai Stoud Platou, first cousin of Lars and Valborg Platou, second cousin of Gabriel Andreas Stoud Platou, Christian Emil Stoud Platou and Waldemar Stoud Platou and first cousin once removed of Carl Platou.

In November 1876 in Kristiania he married Emma Collett (1850–1934), a daughter of Johan Christian Collett.

== Career ==
Platou finished his secondary education at Christiania Cathedral School in 1863, enrolled at the university and took the cand.jur. degree in 1869. He was a deputy judge under his father in Nes District Court from 1870 to 1871, and was then hired at the University Library of Christiania. From 1872 to 1874 he studied in Leipzig, Göttingen and Rome with a scholarship. In 1875, he won the Crown Prince Gold Medal for the thesis Det navngivne Handelsselskabs Retsforhold ligeoverfor Tredjemand, which also earned him the dr.juris degree in 1876.

In 1875 Platou applied to become professor of jurisprudence, but lost out to Bernhard Getz. He instead became assessor in Oslo City Court in 1876. He also wrote the work Om Livsforsikringskontraktens Natur on insurance law, released in 1887. He was a member of several law-preparing commissions. His ideal was Roman law, and he regarded the attempts of making Norwegian laws without using Roman law as "smelling of whey cheese". In October 1890 he was finally appointed as a professor of jurisprudence at the Royal Frederick University. He was a productive author, with works such as Forelæsninger over norsk Arveret (1899, inheritance law), Forelæsninger over Ægteskabs Stiftelse og Skilsmisse (1899, marital law), Forelæsninger over norsk Søret (1900, maritime law), Forelæsninger over norsk Selskabsret (two volumes 1906 and 1911, corporate law), Umyndiges Retshandler (1911), Forelæsninger over udvalgte Emner af Privatrettens almindelige Del (two volumes 1912 and 1914) and Forelæsninger over Retskildernes Theori (1915). It has been noted that these works were "qualitatively of highly inequal value", with Forelæsninger over norsk Arveret and Forelæsninger over norsk Søret being the most important.

Platou also co-founded the Comité Maritime International in 1897, and was one of the vice president in the International Law Association from 1907. He developed an eye disease in 1910, and became blind in 1915. Despite this he continued as a professor for five years. He retired in 1920.
