= SK Odd =

Norwegian skiing club

Skiklubben Odd was a Norwegian skiing club, based in Oslo.

The club was founded by Arne Ustvedt, Ansgar Guldberg, Trygve Heyerdahl, Olav Klingenberg, Olaf Carlsen, Peter Nicolaysen and Vilhelm Heiberg on 17 October 1889.

Odd had several elite competitors in the 1890s. Founder Arne Ustvedt won the Ladies' Cup at the Holmenkollen Ski Festival in 1892, and also achieved a hill record in Holmenkollbakken. Trygve Heyerdahl finished third in the Nordic combined in 1894. Viktor Thorn won the King's Cup and the Holmenkollen Medal in 1895, and also finished second in the Nordic combined in 1899. Asbjørn Nilssen finished second in the Nordic combined in 1897 and was awarded the Holmenkollen Medal, and was also a world record holder.

The club retired from active skiing in 1901. The same year the club bought Hjalmar Welhaven's cabin at the lake Slaktern, Oddhytta. It thereby became one of the exclusive "ski cabin clubs" in Oslo, and remained so long after its withdrawal from active sports.
