= Lars Backer =

Norwegian architect (1892–1930)

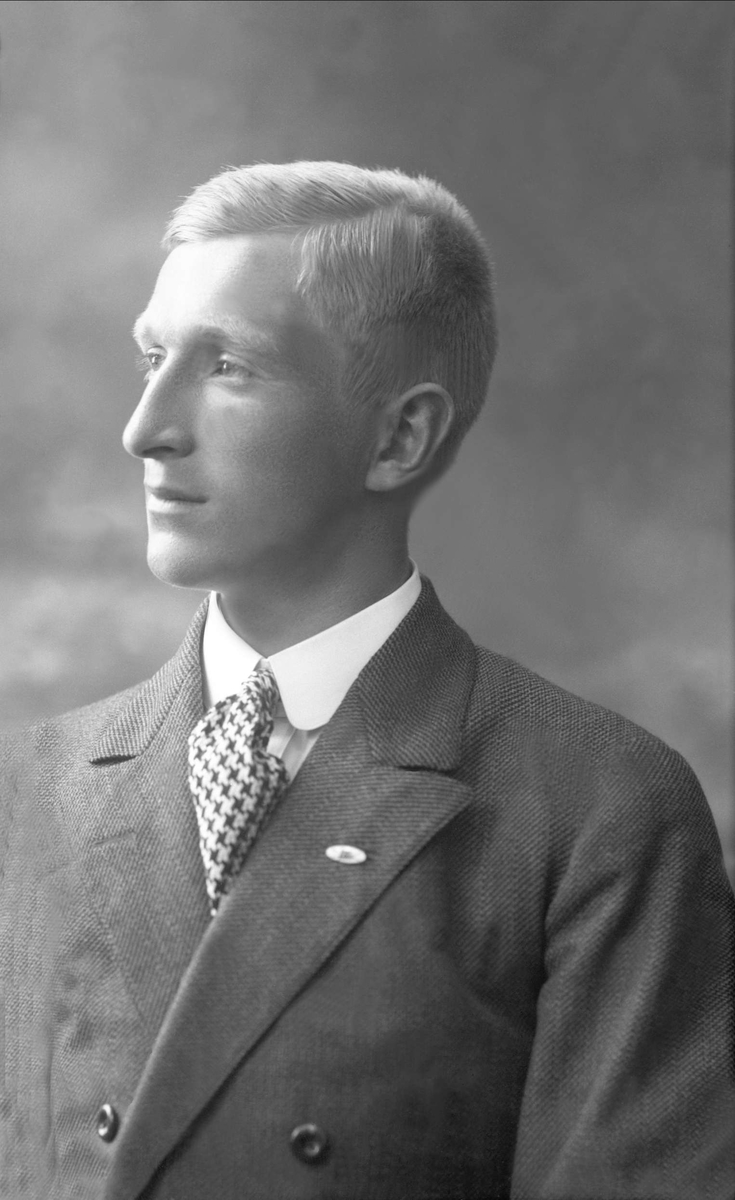
- Lars Backer in 1911
- Born: January 5, 1892; Oslo
- Died: June 7, 1930 (aged 38); Oslo

Lars Thalian Backer (5 January 1892 – 7 June 1930) was a Norwegian architect. Backer was a pioneer of modernism in Norwegian architecture during the 1920s.

== Biography ==
Backer was born in Oslo, Norway. His parents were Herman Major Backer (1856–1932) and Elisabeth Christiane Boeck (1868–1958). His father was also a noted architect whose work included St. John's Church in Bergen and Villa Fridheim in Krødsherad.

Backer was educated at the Oslo National Academy of the Arts under the supervision of Herman Major Schirmer and the Royal Institute of Technology in Stockholm, from which he graduated in 1915. He served as an apprentice with several notable contemporary architects in Norway, including Harald Hals (1876–1959) and Ole Sverre (1865–1952), as well as Arnstein Arneberg and Magnus Poulsson.

He attended the Architectural Association School of Architecture in London from 1919 to 1920. After completing an internship, he started his own practice in Oslo during 1921.

Backer was responsible for several notable Scandinavian works including the Skansen restaurant (1926–1927) and Ekebergrestauranten (1927–29) in Oslo, and the first high-rise office building in the city. His Skansen restaurant was the first modernist building in Norway, earning Backer lasting fame as a pioneer of Scandinavian Functionalism.

Backer died at the age of 38 from a streptococcal infection. He was buried at Vestre gravlund in Oslo. Several members of his firm carried on his work and made names of their own, including Frithjof Stoud Platou who completed the design work on Horngården, an eight-story building on Egertorget in Oslo.

== Buildings ==
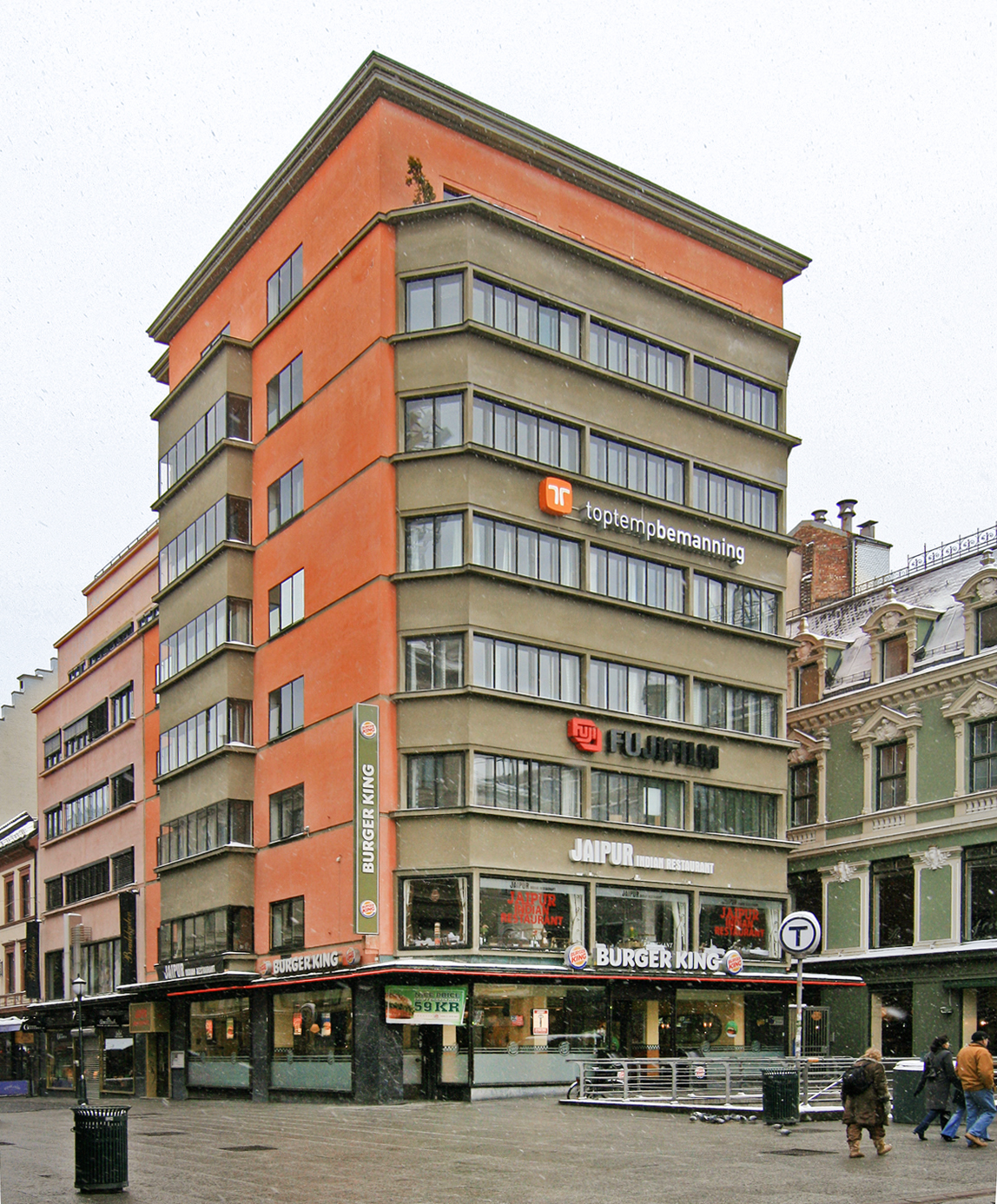
Øvre Slottsgate 21

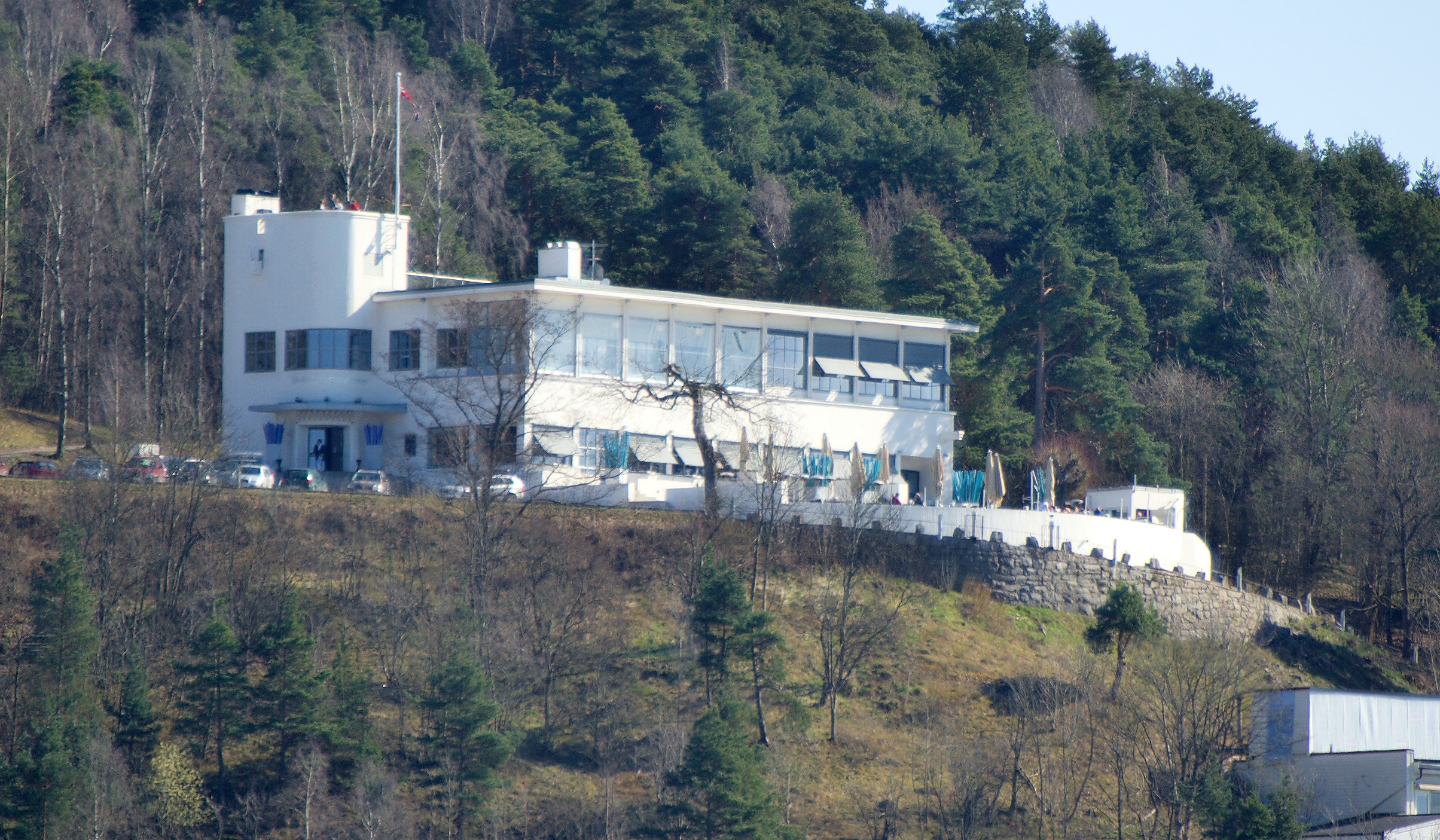
Ekebergrestauranten

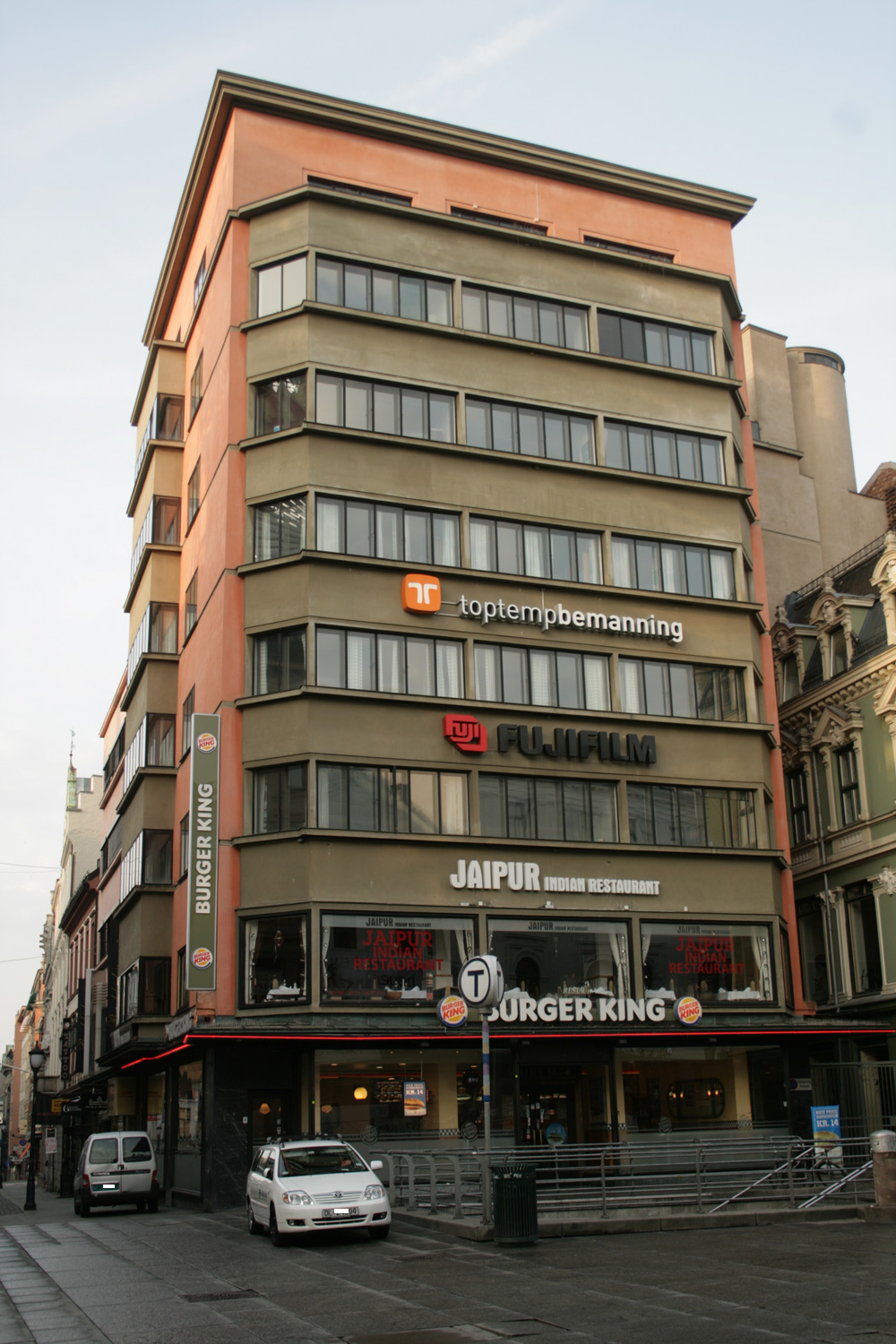
Horngarden in Oslo
