= Carl Nicolai Stoud Platou =

Norwegian civil servant and politician

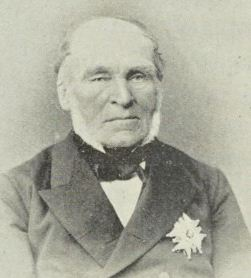
Carl Nicolai Stoud Platou, c. 1925

Carl Nicolai Stoud Platou (26 June 1809 – 11 September 1888) was a Norwegian civil servant and politician.

== Personal life ==
He was born in Christiania as a son of educator, professor, politician and State Secretary Ludvig Stoud Platou (1749–1815) and his wife Karen Lumholtz (1785–1833). He was a maternal grandson of Nicolai Lumholtz and brother of Frederik Christian Stoud Platou, and through the latter an uncle of Oscar Ludvig Stoud Platou.

In August 1838 in Undrumsdal he married Christence Dorothea Plade Nielsen (1817–1889). They had the son Lars Hannibal Sommerfeldt Stoud Platou and the daughter Valborg Platou. A third son Carl Ludvig named his son Carl Nicolai Stoud Platou, Jr.

== Career ==
He took his examen artium in 1827 and graduated from the university with the cand.jur. degree in 1832. He was hired as a clerk in the Norwegian Ministry of Justice in 1833, the same year his father died. He was later promoted, but started as an auditor in Christianssand in 1844. From 1846 to 1853 he was an assessor in Bergen, but in 1853 he returned to Christianssand as burgomaster. He was elected to the Parliament of Norway, representing his city in 1857–58. From 1860 to his death he was the burgomaster of Bergen. He was also the city's deputy mayor in 1853.

Platou laid down a sizeable amount of work for Bergen city. He was a board member of Bergen Museum from 1850 to 1853 and then from 1864, became a board member of Det Nyttige Selskab from 1871 (praeses from 1875 to 1876), helped found Bergen Public Library in 1872 and chaired the local railway committee from 1874. He was honored locally with a bust in the city hall in 1885, and a street at Nygårdshøyden being named for him in 1891. He was honored nationally with the Commander Cross of the Royal Norwegian Order of St. Olav in 1885.

He was a member of the Royal Norwegian Society of Sciences and Letters from 1849, and wrote extensively. He reissued his father's textbook Udtog af Geographien for Begyndere seven times, the last in 1862. He died on 11 September 1888 in Bergen.
