= Carl Platou =

Norwegian civil servant and politician

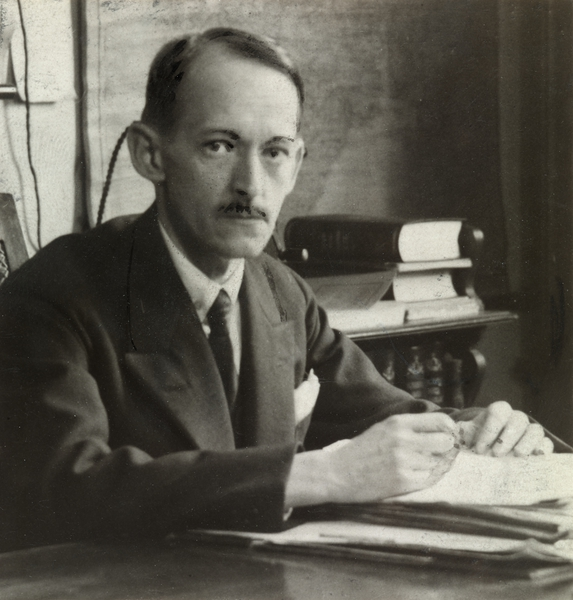
Carl Nicolai Stoud Platou, c. 1933

Carl Nicolai Stoud Platou (25 July 1885 – 1 February 1956) was a Norwegian civil servant and politician. A jurist by education, he is best known for his civil servant career in the Norwegian Ministry of Justice and the Police, which spanned from 1911 to 1941. He was promoted to deputy under-secretary of state in 1926, but was dismissed and later incarcerated for listening to hostile radio in 1941, during the occupation of Norway by Nazi Germany. He returned after the war as Chief Minister of the Ministry of Justice and the Police in May 1945 and County Governor of Akershus and Oslo from 1945 to 1955. He had been involved in politics before the war as well, as deputy mayor of Aker.

== Personal life ==
He was born in Bergen as the son of jurist Carl Ludvig Stoud Platou (1841–1898) and his wife Mette Marie Grüner Christiansen (1846–1927). He was a grandson of Carl Nicolai Stoud Platou Sr., nephew of Valborg Platou and Lars Hannibal Sommerfeldt Stoud Platou, grandnephew of Fredrik Christian Stoud Platou and great-grandson of Ludvig Stoud Platou. Oscar Ludvig Stoud Platou was his first cousin once removed.

In January 1911 he married Astri Nilssen (1887–1963). His daughter Ellen married mathematician Erik Magnus Alfsen.

== Career ==
Platou grew up in Kristiania, finished his secondary education in 1902 and enrolled in law studies at the University of Oslo. He graduated with the cand.jur. degree in 1908, and worked as a law clerk in Elverum for two years. He then worked one year as a lawyer's clerk in Kristiania before being hired as a secretary in the Ministry of Justice and the Police. In 1915 he was promoted to subdirector. In 1925 he spent one year in auditing before being promoted to deputy under-secretary of state in the Ministry of Justice.

He represented a non-partisan list on the municipal council for Aker Municipality from the 1920s, and served as deputy mayor there from 1930 to 1931. He was also the chair of Akers Elektrisitetsverk from 1927 to 1935 and a member of the board of Akers Sparebank and Freia. He also held lectures at the University of Oslo, and was a member of several public commissions and committees.

=== World War II ===
In the spring of 1940, Nazi Germany invaded and occupied Norway. When the royal family and the sitting cabinet Nygaardsvold fled the capital city, Platou followed, but when the German occupation was consolidated, Platou was back in Oslo. German Reichskommissar Josef Terboven soon dominated Norwegian politics, and already in October he expressed a wish to remove Platou from office. However, the Nazi Minister of Justice since September, Sverre Riisnæs, refused. Vidkun Quisling supported Riisnæs in this case. Following a loyalty declaration, Platou was allowed to continue. However, it was clear to all involved that Platou as well as other employees were far from Nazi or Fascist. To balance the situation, the authorities brought in an orthodox Nazi, Reinholdt Breien, an additional under-secretary.

Platou was largely loyal during his one year in the Nazi-controlled Minister of Justice. When the pre-war Supreme Court Justices laid down their offices in December 1940, Platou participated in appointing the new, collaborationist Supreme Court Justices—though these were not first and foremost drawn from the Fascist milieu. In October 1941, however, Riisnæs found Platou in his office with two clerks, listening to Norwegian resistance broadcasts from London. It was well known by Nazi leaders that Riisnæs and other prominent figures were denounced in these broadcasts. After discussing this with friend and high-ranking German official Rolf Schiedermair, Riisnæs reported the incident to the police. It is accepted that Riisnæs had few personal reasons to do so, however, considering the possible political implications the message had to be sent. Platou tried to avoid the whole issue by resigning, but was nonetheless apprehended by Nazi authorities. He was incarcerated at Møllergata 19, Grini and Bredtveit before being released in December 1942.

=== Post-war career and legacy ===
When Norway was liberated on 8 May 1945, Platou made a comeback on the political scene. As the exiled Nygaardsvold cabinet did not return immediately, Chief Officers were appointed by the Home Front to ensure the restoration of the liberal democratic regime. Platou was among the Chief Officers, heading the Ministry of Justice and the Police. A so-called government delegation, consisting of exiled politicians but not the actual cabinet members, was set up on 8 May, deletages reaching Norway between 12 and 14 May. On the latter date, Platou was succeeded by Terje Wold. On 1 November 1945 Platou took the vacant seat as County Governor of Akershus and Oslo, and sat until his retirement in 1955. He was also the deputy chairman of the Norwegian Folk Art and Craft Association from 1946 to 1951 and a board member of Det Norske Luftfartselskap from 1946. In 1955, his year of retirement, he became secretary of the pensioners' association Landslaget for statspensjonister, succeeding Ingrid Skotte.

Platou was decorated as a Commander of the Order of St. Olav, the Swedish Order of Vasa and the Finnish Order of the White Rose, as well as Grand Cross of the Danish Order of the Dannebrog. He died in February 1956 in Oslo.

== Bibliography ==
- Ringdal, Nils Johan (1991) [1989]. Gal mann til rett tid: NS-minister Sverre Riisnæs – en psykobiografi (in Norwegian). Oslo: Aschehoug. ISBN 82-03-16110-3.

Political offices
Preceded by Sverre Riisnæs (Justice – Nazi); Jonas Lie (Police – Nazi)	Norwegian Chief Minister of Justice and the Police; 8 May 1945–14 May 1945	Succeeded by Terje Wold
Civic offices
Preceded by Ingolf E. Christensen	County Governor of Akershus and Oslo; 1945–1955	Succeeded by Trygve Lie
