= August Fleischer =

August Konow Fleischer (28 September 1841 – 4 April 1931) was a Norwegian railway engineer and manager. He was born in Bergen. He worked for the Norwegian State Railways from 1863, and was acting director-general from 1910 to 1912.

Civic offices
Preceded by	Director of the Norwegian State Railways (acting); 1910–1912	Succeeded by Christian Emil Stoud Platou (acting)
