= Petter Nilssen =

Petter Nilssen (14 May 1869 – April 1939) was a Norwegian master watchmaker and later a politician for the Labour and Social Democratic Labour parties.

He was born in Lillehammer. He was a son of shoemaker Mathias Nilssen (1834–1920) and Eline Pedersen (1835–1918), and an older brother of Labour Party secretary Magnus Nilssen. Nilssen was an active socialist already in the 1880s, and was involved in the early labour movement as a founder of worker's associations (Norwegian: arbeiderforeninger). He founded worker's associations, and later social democratic associations, in Hønefoss, Lillehammer and Kristians Amt (Oppland county). He was a national board member of the Labour Party from 1909 to 1918, and a member of Lillehammer city council from 1902 to 1928.

He stood several times for national election. He was the Labour Party's candidate in the 1906 Norwegian parliamentary election in the single-member urban constituency Lillehammer, Hamar, Gjøvik og Kongsvinger. He was beaten in the first round by Conservative candidate Axel Thallaug, who was also from Lillehammer, but Nilssen edged out the Liberal and Labour Democrat candidates. In the second round Nilssen lost to Thallaug with 1,045 versus 1,284 votes. In the 1909 Norwegian parliamentary election Nilssen was again selected as the party's candidate, and again faced Thallaug. Nilssen won a majority in the sub-constituency Hamar, because the conservative vote was split between Thallaug and Gabriel Andreas Stoud Platou. Platou only stood in his hometown Hamar, and Thallaug carried the three other cities. There was thus a second round between Thallaug and Nilssen, where Nilssen managed to carry the sub-constituency Gjøvik. In total, however, he lost with 1,986 versus 2,550 votes.

After the party split in Labour in 1921, Nilssen joined the Social Democratic Labour Party. He headed their ballot in the Market towns of Hedmark and Oppland counties in the 1921 election but was not elected.
