= Kon-Tiki Museum =

Norwegian maritime museum in Oslo

Coordinates: 59°54′13″N 10°41′53″E

- Kon-Tiki Museet
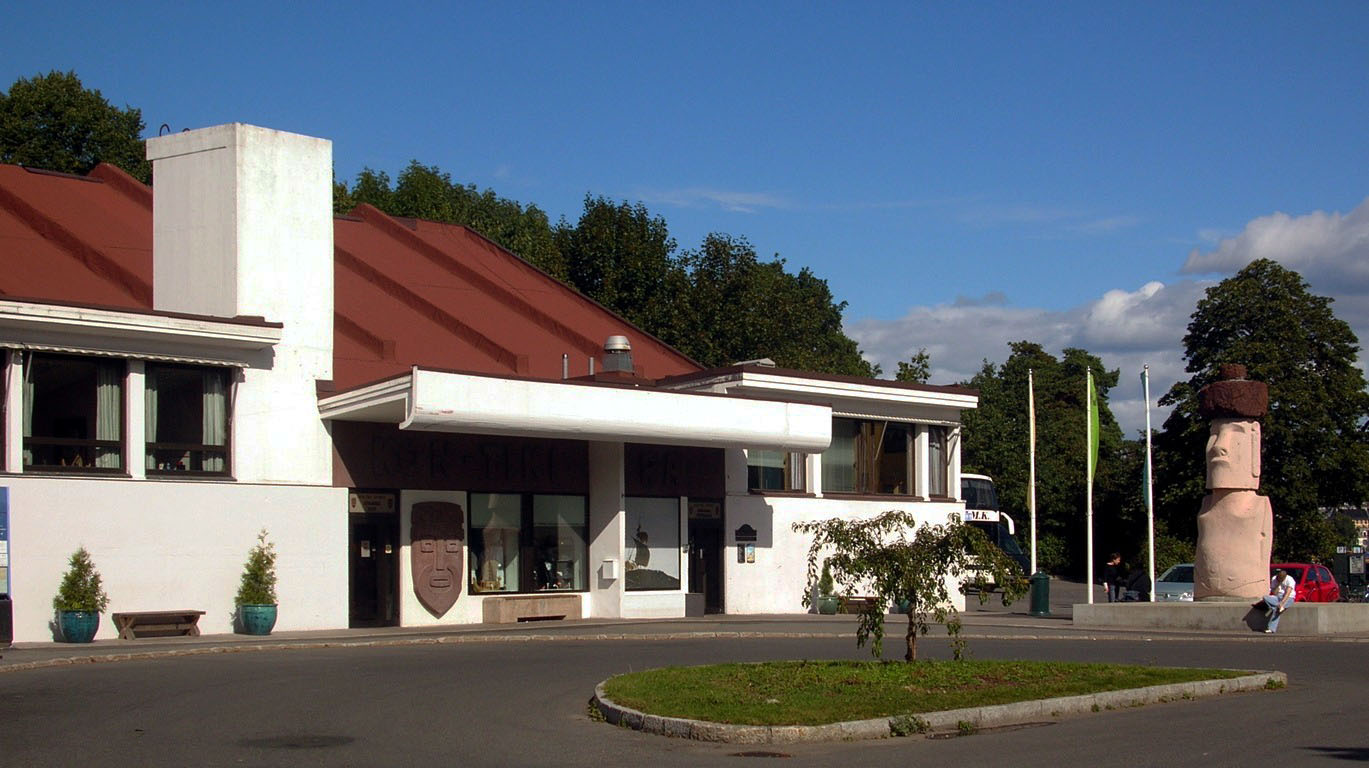
- Established: 1949
- Location: Bygdøy, Oslo, Norway
- Director: Martin Biehl

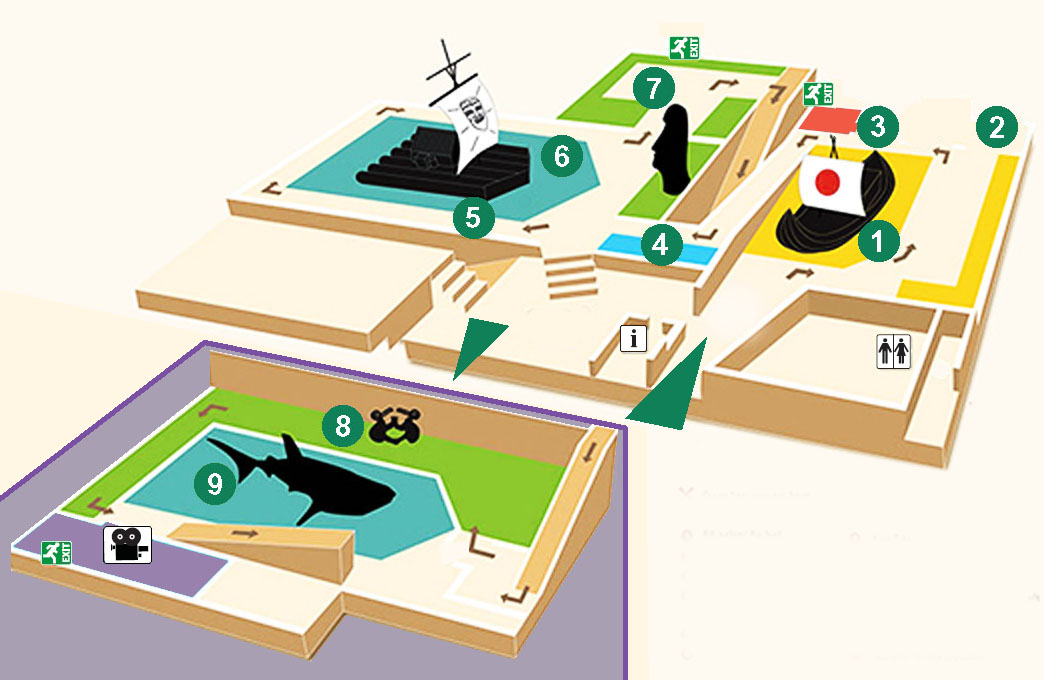
Layout of Kon-Tiki Museum

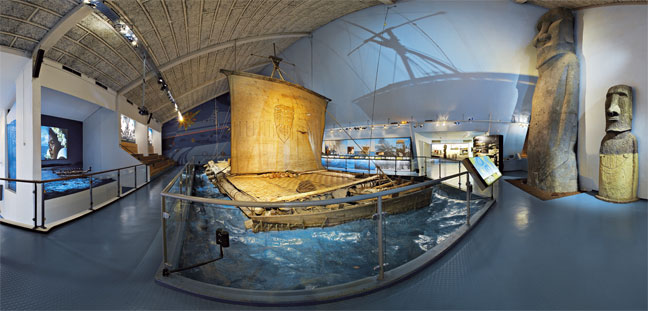
Kon-Tiki

The Kon-Tiki Museum (Norwegian: Kon-Tiki Museet) is a museum in the Bygdøy peninsula in Oslo, Norway. It houses vessels and maps from the Kon-Tiki expedition, as well as a library with about 8,000 books. It was opened in a provisional building in 1949. In 1957, the current building—designed by architects F. S. Platou and Otto Torgersen—was opened. In 1978, an extension of the museum designed by Torgersen was opened.

The museum was originally built to house the Kon-Tiki, a raft of balsa wood of pre-Columbian model that Norwegian adventurer Thor Heyerdahl used to sail from Peru to Polynesia in 1947. Another boat in the museum is the Ra II, a vessel built of reeds according to Heyerdahl's perception of an ancient Egyptian seagoing boat. Heyerdahl sailed the Ra II from North Africa to the Caribbean after a previous attempt with the reed boat Ra failed.

Beneath the raft is a model of the whale shark that the crew encountered on the voyage.

The Kon-Tiki Museum is situated near several other museums including the Fram Museum, the Norwegian Museum of Cultural History, the Viking Ship Museum and the Norwegian Maritime Museum.

Since 1986, the museum has periodically repatriated items collected by Heyerdahl to Easter Island, with the most recent occurring in 2024.
