= Ragnar Stoud Platou =

Norwegian ship broker

Ragnar Stoud Platou (8 April 1897 – 1 April 1979) was a Norwegian ship broker.

== Personal life ==
Platou was born to the banker Gabriel Andreas Stoud Platou (1858–1911) and his wife Ingeborg Sophie Falck (1864–1958). His younger brother was the architect Frithjof Stoud Platou. He was also nephew of Christian Emil Stoud Platou and Waldemar Stoud Platou, and cousin of Karen Platou.

He married Anna Margareta von Friesen Parelius (1892–1970) on 11 October 1919, but divorced with her in 1939. On 5 April the same year, Platou married Anette Beate Wackenitz Horn (1908–94).

== Career ==
Platou was born in Hamar, but studied at Otto Treider's private school in Kristiania from 1914 to 1915. He was thereafter employed in a shipbroking company named Conrad Boe Ltd. In June 1932, the organisation Tankskibscentralen was established, which was headed by Platou. However, the organisation gained little support, and was disestablished in the end of 1933.

On 1 February 1936, Platou started his own shipbroking company, R. S. Platou. The company gained surplus in the first years, and had a staff of 20 people. In 1957, the staff comprised 40 people. In 1963, a research department was established, which some years later was separated into a subsidiary with the name A/S Shipping Consultants. In 1972, Platou decided to establish a new research department in the company.

Platou was interested in golf, and headed several golf clubs in Norway. Platou was decorated as a Commander of the Royal Norwegian Order of St. Olav in 1975. He was also decorated as a Commander of the Swedish Order of Vasa, as a Knight of the Danish Dannebrog Order and as an officer of the Dutch Order of Orange-Nassau. He died on 1 April 1979.
