= Asbjørn Nilssen =

Norwegian Nordic combined skier (1875–1958)

Personal information
- Nationality: Norway
- Born: 19 January 1875 Vestre Aker, Oslo, Norway
- Died: 19 October 1958 (aged 83) Oslo, Norway

Sport
- Sport: Skiing
- Club: Skikluben Odd

Achievements and titles
- Personal bests: 32.5 m (107 ft); Bærum, Norway (1899)

Asbjørn Nilssen (19 January 1875 – 19 October 1958) was a Norwegian Nordic combined skier and physician.

== Career ==
He represented the club SK Odd. In 1895 he finished second in the B class at the Holmenkollen ski festival, and in 1897 he finished second in the A class and won the Holmenkollen medal. In 1895 he also finished seventh in Saltsjöbaden. He later won the Holmenkollen veteran's class in 1906. He held the world record in ski jumping, tied with Morten Hansen, with 32.5 metres achieved in Solbergbakken in 1899.

Outside sports, he graduated with a cand.med. degree from the Royal Frederick University and spent his career as a physician. He died in October 1958 and was buried at Vestre gravlund.

== Ski jumping world record ==
Date	Hill	Location	Metres	Feet
1899	Solbergbakken	Bærum, Norway	32.5	107
