= Christian Emil Stoud Platou =

Norwegian politician

Christian Emil Stoud Platou (18 April 1861 – 28 July 1923) was a Norwegian railroad director and politician for the Conservative Party.

== Personal life ==
He was born in Hamar as the son of banker Christian Fredrik Stoud Platou (1824–1883) and Elise Sem (1833–1923). He was a brother of Gabriel Andreas Stoud Platou and Waldemar Stoud Platou, grandnephew of Ludvig Stoud Platou, uncle of Karen, Ragnar and Frithjof Stoud Platou and granduncle of Lars T. Platou. He was also a second cousin of Oscar, Lars and Valborg Platou.

In July 1889 in Ottestad he married physician's daughter Mina Lund.

== Career ==
He finished his secondary education in 1879, and graduated with the cand.jur. degree in 1884. He worked two years as a law clerk in Mandal, but then spent the rest of his career in the Norwegian State Railways. Making his way up from secretary to the board, he became assistant to the director of traffic in 1903, acting director of traffic in 1907, manager of the Main Line from 1910 to 1912 and acting director-general of the State Railways from 1912 to March 1919.

He was elected to the Parliament of Norway in 1921, representing the constituency of Kristiania. He did not serve through the entire term, as he died in July 1923. He was also president of the Federation of Norwegian Industries from 1919 to his death. He was also a board member of O. Mustad & Søn, the Schou Brewery, and Christiania Sparebank.

Civic offices
| Preceded by August Fleischer (acting) | Director of the Norwegian State Railways (acting); 1912–1919 | Succeeded by Theodor Holtfodt |
Business positions
| Preceded by Gustav Adolf Jebsen | President of the Federation of Norwegian Industries; 1919–1923 | Succeeded by Cæsar Bang |
