= Waldemar Stoud Platou =

Norwegian businessman (1868–1930)

Portrait.

Waldemar Stoud Platou (11 August 1868 – 13 July 1930) was a Norwegian businessperson. He had a long career in the brewery industry.

== Personal life ==
He was born in Furnes Municipality, in Hedmark county, as the son of banker Christian Fredrik Stoud Platou (1824–1883) and Elise Sem (1833–1923). He was a brother of Gabriel Andreas Stoud Platou and Christian Emil Stoud Platou, grandnephew of Ludvig Stoud Platou, uncle of Karen, Ragnar and Frithjof Stoud Platou and granduncle of Lars T. Platou. He was also a second cousin of Oscar, Lars and Valborg Platou.

Platou married three times. In January 1891 in Kristiania he married Hilda Oppegaard (1859–1954), but the marriage was dissolved in 1908. In March 1910 in Bergen he married actor Dina Nordvik (1884–1921). After her death he married French citizen Alexandra Henriette Maud de Ciccolini in April 1926 in Nice.

== Career ==
He attended a commerce school in his hometown, Hamar, and at the age of 16 he became a brewer's apprentice at Christiania Bryggeri in Norway's capital. After studies in Germany and Bohemia, he took the brewer's examination in Worms in 1888. He returned to Norway, and was hired as brewery manager of Christiania Bryggeri in 1889. On 1 November 1891 he became manager of the newly established Bergen brewery Hansa Bryggeri. He was behind the founding of the brewery, when he bought Det Sembske Bryggeri and asked in Bergen's local press for further investments. He advanced from manager to chief executive officer of Hansa in 1898. He was later the chief executive officer of Frydenlunds Bryggeri from 1916 to 1924, and then chairman of Frydenlunds until his death.

He co-founded the interest organization Norsk Bryggeriforening for non-Christiania breweries in 1894, and after it merged with the Christiania Bryggeriers Forening to form Den norske Bryggeriforening, Platou took part here too as a board member. He also sat on the supervisory council of Vinmonopolet. Platou was also involved in the Norwegian Trekking Association, and was in 1914 the first chairman of Fløibanen. In 1926 he chaired Foreningen for Reiselivet i Norge. He was a member of the municipal council of Bergen Municipality from 1905 to 1907 and the municipal council for Aker Municipality from 1918 to 1920, for the Conservative Party. His brother was a parliamentarian for the same party.

Platou was decorated as a Knight, First Class of the Royal Norwegian Order of St. Olav in 1910. A bust of him was raised at Fløibanen's terminus station Vetrlidsalmenning. In 1927 he retreated to a farm he had bought in Stange Municipality, where he died in July 1930.
