= John Torgersen =

Norwegian businessman and politician

John Torgersen (13 December 1878 – 21 May 1958) was a Norwegian businessperson and politician.

He was born in Kristiania, and moved to Fornebo in 1903. He took commerce school in 1896 and worked in Hamburg and London for several years.

After working with pulp export from 1901, he was hired as manager of Lysaker Kemiske Fabrik in 1905, then secretary in Union Co in 1909. He was the manager of Labro Tresliperi from 1913 to 1917, and of Nitroglycerin Compagniet / Norsk Sprængstofindustri from 1914 to 1919. He was a board member of Union Co from 1924 to 1940, Lilleborg Fabrikker from 1930, Kværner Brug from 1931, De-No-Fa from 1945, of the bank Centralbanken for Norge from 1923 to 1935 and of Granfos Brug and the Federation of Norwegian Industries.

He was a member of Bærum municipal council from 1920 to 1928, served as deputy mayor from 1920 to 1922 and mayor from 1923 to 1925. He also chaired the local and county party chapters.

Political offices
Preceded by Kristen O. Aamodt	Mayor of Bærum; 1923–1925	Succeeded by Alf Staver
