= Solbergbakken =

Now closed ski jumping hill at Valler in Bærum, Norway

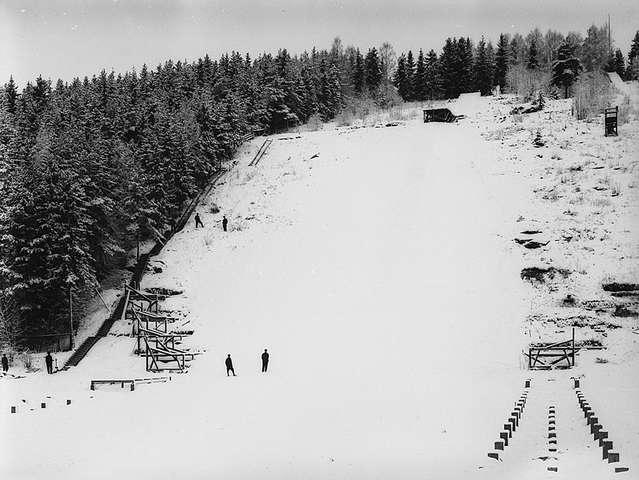
- Photo taken between 1914 and 1918
- Location: Valler, Bærum, Norway
- Coordinates: 59°54′15.4″N 10°32′12.7″E
- Opened: 1886 (construction finished); 29 January 1888 (opened)
- Closed: 1992

Size
- K–point: K60
- Hill record: 60 m (200 ft) (1977)

Solbergbakken was a K60 ski jumping hill located at Valler (Gjettum) in Bærum, Norway and owned by Bærums SK.

== History ==
On 29 January 1888, Solbergbakken located at the western suburb of Oslo, was officially opened as one of the largest in the world, but already constructed in 1886. Total of four official world records have been set.

On 5 February 1899, Asbjørn Nilssen and Morten Hansen set 32.5 meters (107 ft), while Olaf Tandberg improved it at 35.5 meters (116 ft) the following year.

Between 1897 and 1902 also total of six invalid world record were set by Norwegian men; Cato Aall (31.5 m), Asbjørn Nilssen (35 m), Trygve Smith (36 m), Aksel Refstad (2 x 36 m) and Albert Wüller (36.5 m).

On 6 February 1910, Hilda Stang from Norway set the only world record for women on this hill at 22 meters (77 ft).

In 1917, the ski jump was extended for the first time and reopened with a new hill record of 44 meters (144 ft). And two years later 15,000 spectators attended “Hovedlandsrenn”.

In 1935, for the first time, the 50 meter bench-mark was over-leaped. From 1955 on, the facility was only used as training ski jumping hill, on larger Skuibakken Bærums Skiklub even hosted several Norwegian Championships and two World Cup competitions. In 1977, the 60 meter hill was covered with plastic matting and in 1992 the very last summer competition on plastic was hosted there.

When Bærums SK arranged Norwegian Championships, these were normally held in the hill Skuibakken. The Nazi national championships were however held in Solbergbakken in 1942 and 1943.

== Ski jumping world records ==
=== Men ===
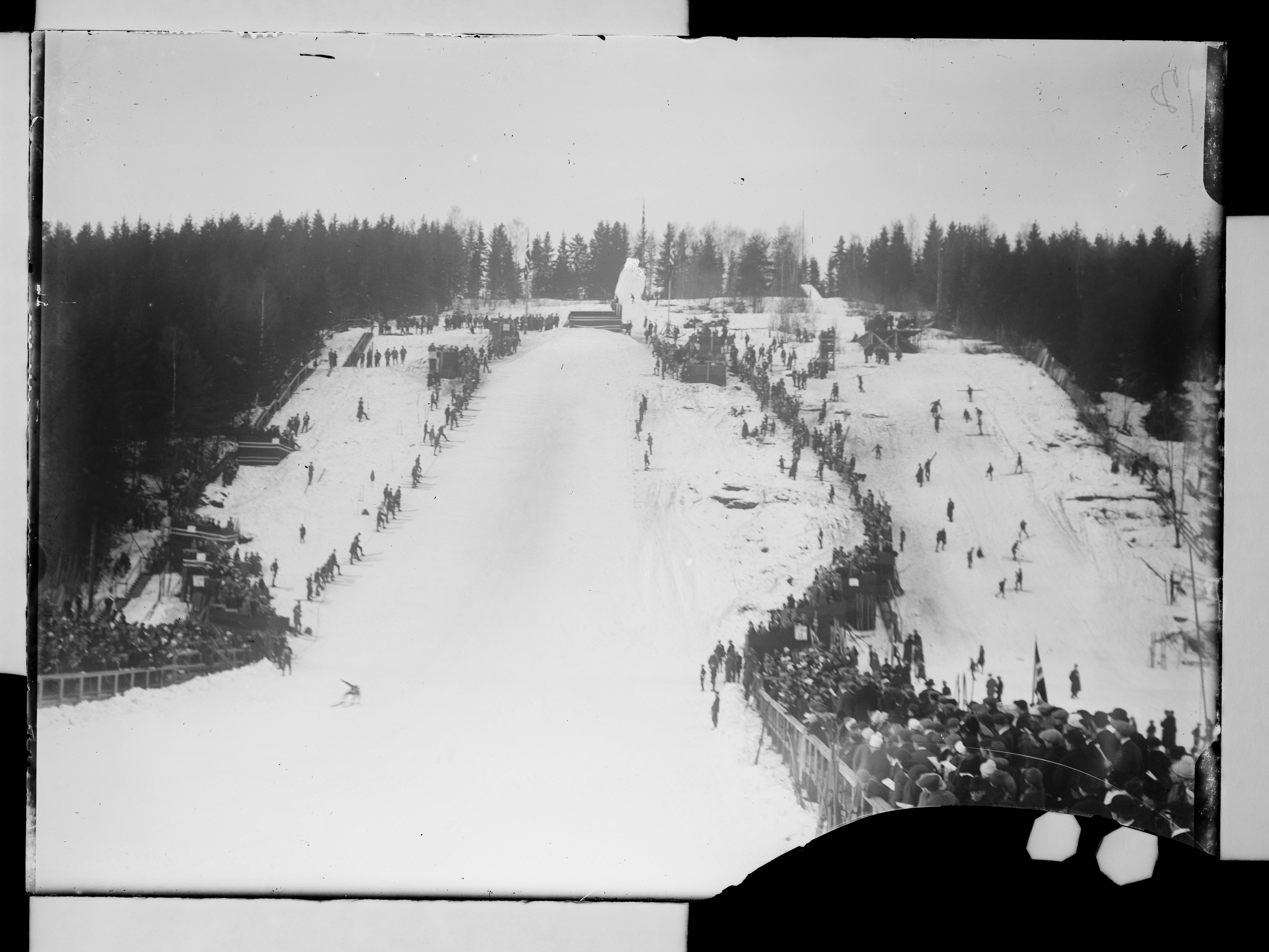
Solbergrendet 1917

No.	Date	Name	Country	Metres	Feet
UN	7 February 1897	Cato Aall	Norway	31.5	103
F	7 February 1897	Asbjørn Nilssen	Norway	35	115
#9	5 February 1899	Asbjørn Nilssen	Norway	32.5	107
#10	5 February 1899	Morten Hansen	Norway	32.5	107
?	1899	Trygve Smith	Norway	36	118
#11	11 February 1900	Olaf Tandberg	Norway	35.5	116
F	11 February 1900	Aksel Refstad	Norway	36	118
F	11 February 1900	Aksel Refstad	Norway	36	118
F	9 February 1902	Albert Wüller	Norway	36.5	120

=== Ladies ===
No.	Date	Name	Country	Metres	Feet
#5	6 February 1910	Hilda Stang	Norway	22	77
