= Valborg Werbeck-Svärdström =

Swedish singer and voice instructor

Valborg Werbeck-Svärdström (22 December 1879 in Gävle, Sweden as Valborg Svärdström – 1 February 1972 in Bad Boll-Eckwälden) was a Swedish singer, voice teacher, and anthroposophist.

== Biography ==
Valborg Werbeck-Svärdström grew up in the northern regions of Sweden. “I was born 22. September 1879 in Gävle. 173 Km north of Stockholm, Sweden. My childhood, as far back as my memory reaches, was spent in intimate contact with Nature. […] I was always able to sing. I suppose one could say I was something of a child prodigy."

When she was ten, her family moved to Stockholm, where the music educator Alice Tegnér discovered her talent. She was already performing at the age of eleven. After completing school and her studies at the Conservatory, she gave her debut and was received into the Ensemble of the Royal Swedish Opera.

She was hailed as "the new Jenny Lind". As a concert and opera singer she experienced enormous success in many of the European countries. In 1906 she married Louis Michael Julius Werbeck, the German writer and musician from Hamburg and moved with him to Germany.

In 1908 she met Rudolf Steiner and received from him indications for her work and encouragement not to give up her successful singing career, but rather to pursue it against her original intentions. Her studies with experienced teachers had certainly guided her to a successful operatic career, but it had shown her that these methods of instruction also endangered her natural voice. She began searching for new methods of developing the voice, and remained in close contact about this with Rudolf Steiner until his death. At the same time she began to build up a method of singing therapy that she later was later to develop further together with Eugen Kolisko, who took singing lessons with her from time to time, and with Ita Wegman. In 1928 her husband died. In 1938 her book '’Uncovering the Voice: The Cleansing Power of Song’’ appeared in German. The work she had started in her singing school of the same name in Hamburg was introduced by Wilhelm Dörfler into his choir work from 1932 until 1939 at the Goetheanum in Dornach. The rise of National Socialism in Germany made her work increasingly difficult. Eventually she had to close her school and spent the War years in semi-isolation in Silesia. The years following the War she devoted totally to her therapeutic work and to the instruction of a circle of young musicians that had gathered around her.

Valborg Werbeck-Sverdström died in 1972 at the age of 92.
