= Otto Torgersen =

Norwegian architect (1910–2000)

Otto Torgersen (16 June 1910 – 12 December 2000) was a Norwegian architect and advertising executive.

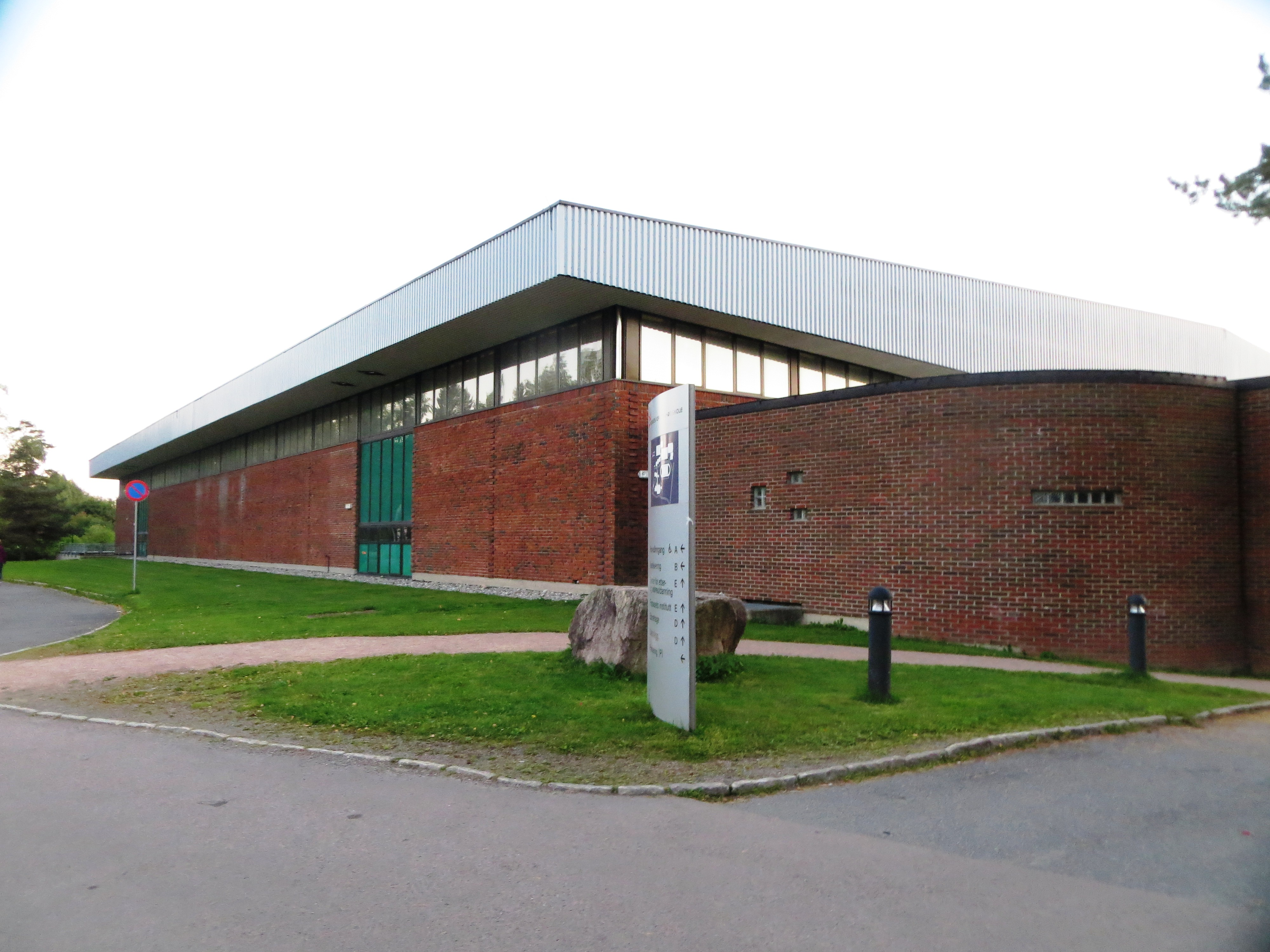
Norwegian School of Sport Sciences (1971)

Torgersen was born in Trondheim, Norway. He studied advertising and architecture at Goldsmiths, University of London (1937–38). In 1947, he founded an advertisement and architectural firm, Pran og Torgersen AS, which he operated jointly in partnership with Christian Pran, who died in 1961.

Among his architectural designs were the Norwegian Museum of Science and Technology at Etterstad from 1960 and the Norwegian School of Sport Sciences (Norges idrettshøgskole) at Sognsvann on Kringsjå in Oslo from 1971.

Torgersen was responsible for designing the exhibitions at Norway's Resistance Museum at Akershus Fortress. He also contributed to the Kon-Tiki Museum and the Fram Museum, both at Bygdøy. He was awarded the advertisers prize Gullblyanten in 1969 for his association with Norway's participation at the Expo 67 at Montreal in 1967, as well as exhibitions at Barcelona in 1957 and at Ekeberg in 1959. He died in December 2000 and was buried at Vestre gravlund.
