= Valborg Stoud Platou =

Valborg Platou
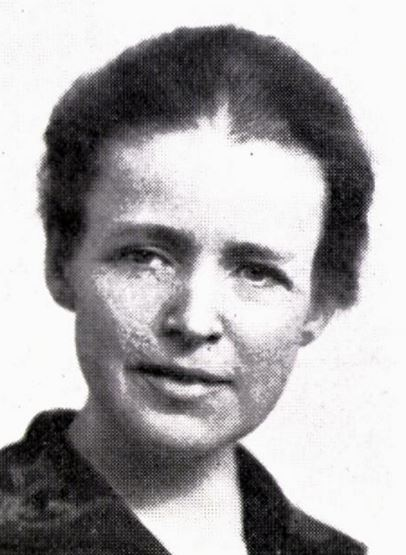

Personal details
- Born: 15 October 1881; Bergen, Norway
- Died: 11 November 1960

Valborg Stoud Platou (15 October 1881 – 11 November 1960) was a Norwegian judge and attorney. From 1911, she served as head of state in the capital of Kristiania, but only a few months since she became a secretary in the Ministry of Labor until 1926. She was one of the first women in Norway who got a job as a judge. She worked until 1947 when she retired.
