= Nicolai Lumholtz =

Danish born Norwegian clergyman

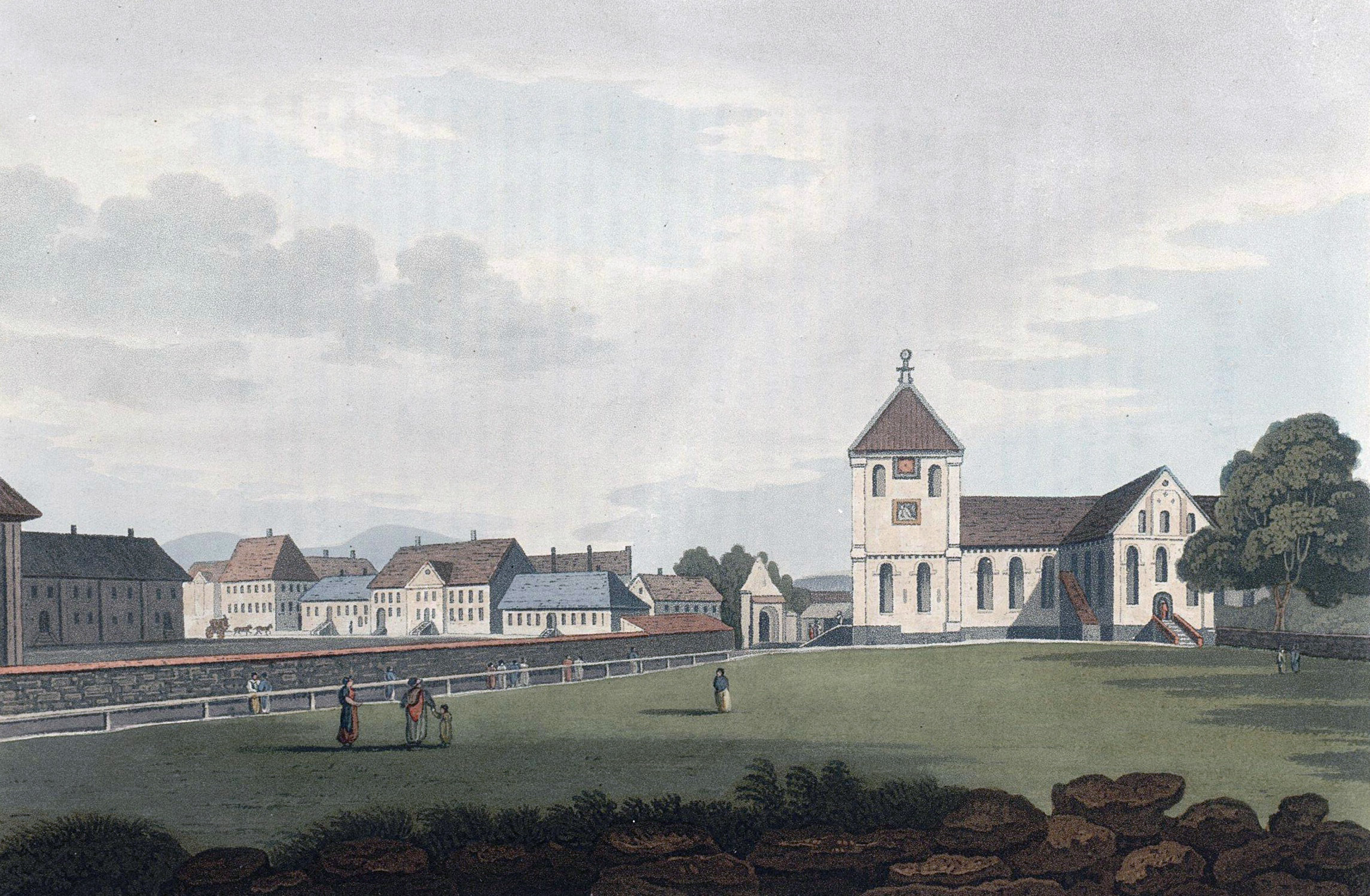
Hoved Kirken i Christiania by John William Edy (1760 – 1820)

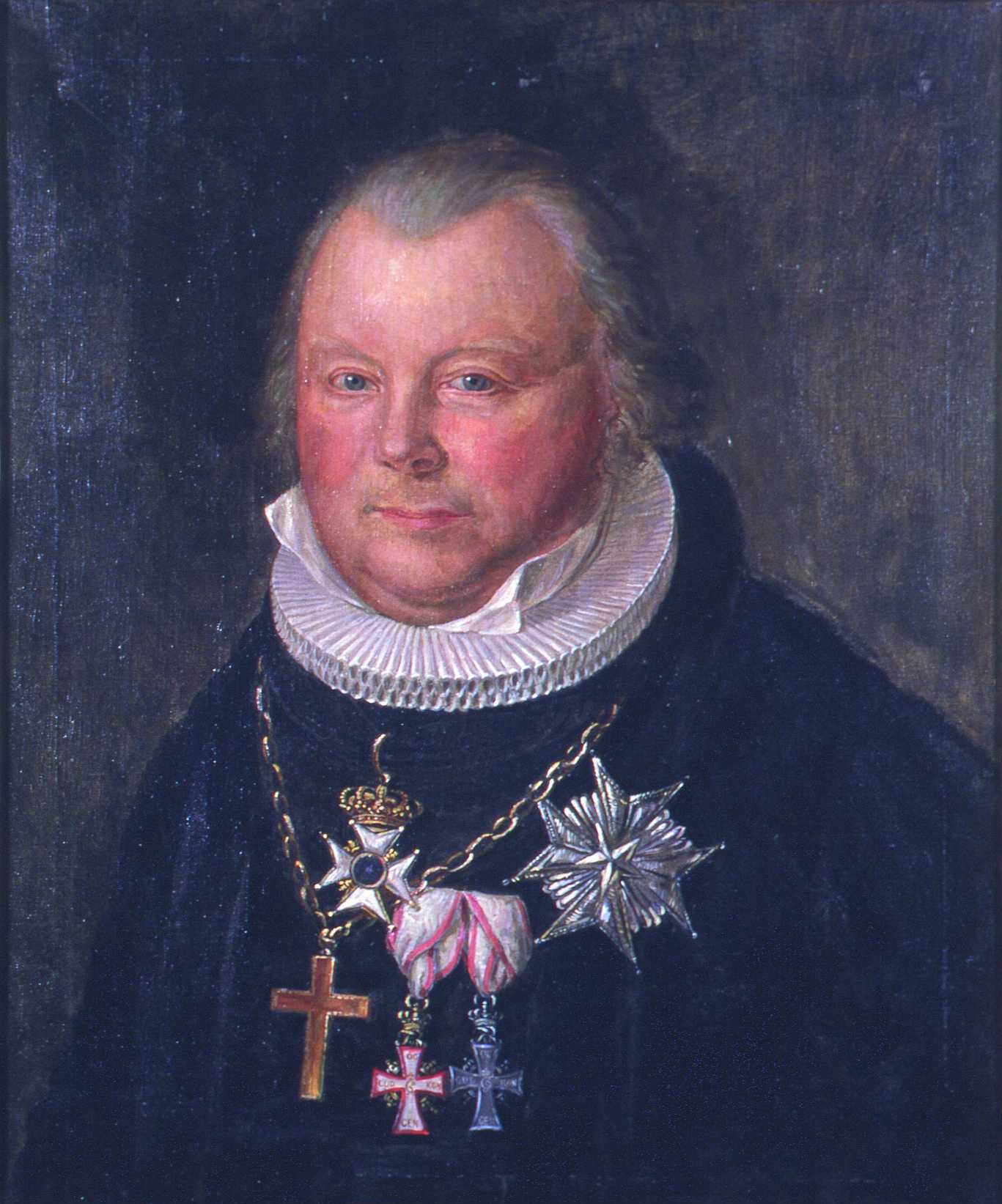
Nicolai Lumholtz was replaced by Bishop Frederik Julius Bech

Nicolai Lumholtz (19 September 1729 – 20 June 1819) was a Danish born, Norwegian clergyman. He served as acting bishop of the Diocese of Christiania.

== Biography ==
He was born in Copenhagen, Denmark as a son of controller Niels Lumholtz (1688–1763). He became a catechist in Nicolai's Church in Copenhagen in 1757, curate in Frederiksborg and hospital priest in Hillerød in 1770, curate in Nicolai's Church in 1772 and dean in the Diocese of Christiania in 1774.

When Bishop Christen Schmidt fell ill and died (1804), Lumholtz was the acting bishop of Christiania. However, he was only given the title of bishop in 1805, the same year that Fredrik Julius Bech (1758-1822) assumed the position. Bech served as bishop until his death in 1822 at which time the position was assumed Christian Sørenssen.

Lumholtz was married three times. The first marriage, to Anne Marie Reus, lasted from November 1770 until her death in February 1779. The second marriage to Kristin Cudrio, lasted from January 1780 until her death in June 1787. In December 1794 he married Karine Næschill, born in 1776. Lumholtz died in June 1819. His widow Karine married later Bishop of Christianssand, Mathias Sigwardt in 1822. With his second wife he had the daughter Karen, who married Ludvig Stoud Platou.

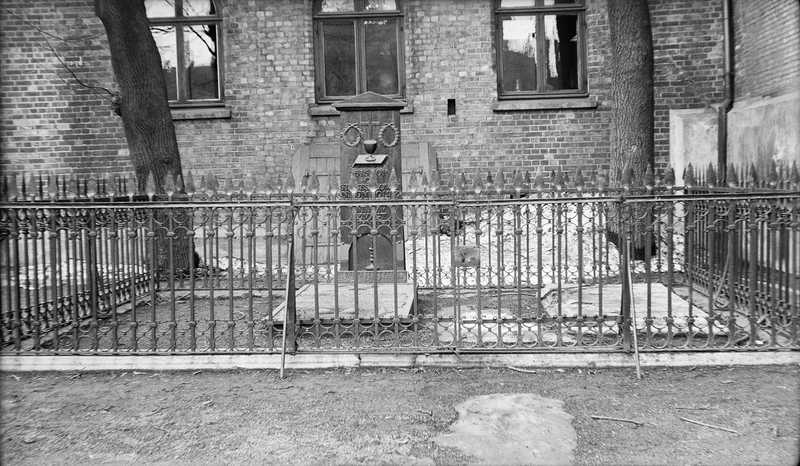
Grave of Bishop Lumholtz (1937)

Church of Norway titles
Preceded by Christen Schmidt	Bishop of Christiania (acting); 1804–1805	Succeeded by Fredrik Julius Bech
