= Karen Platou =

Norwegian businesswoman and politician

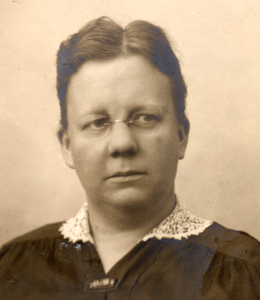
Karen Platou

Karen Platou (9 July 1879 – 10 June 1950) was a Norwegian businesswoman and a politician for the Conservative Party. Platou was the country's first woman to be elected Member of Parliament.^{[a]}

== Biography ==
She was born in Mandal, Vest-Agder, the daughter of treasurer Otto Michael Stoud Platou (1852 – 1903) and Ida Nanna Amalie Ræder (1852 – 1903). Among the many prominent members of her family were her uncle Christian Emil Stoud Platou, rail road director and Conservative politician, and another uncle Waldemar Stoud Platou, brewer and businessman. She grew up in Kristiania – today called Oslo – and received her education here and in Hanover, Germany. After finishing her education, she started working as an architect, and also got involved in organisational and political work.

From 1919 Platou had been a deputy representative in the Norwegian Parliament – Stortinget – for the Conservative Party. In the 1921 election, she was elected Member of Parliament for the constituency of Kristiania, as the first woman in the country. The 1921 election was the first Norwegian election with proportional representation, which probably helped the chance of a woman being elected. Her first speech in Parliament was a criticism of then Prime Minister Otto Blehr's assertion that chocolate was a luxury commodity. Platou believed it was an important part of children's diet. She was elected out of office after her first term was up, but continued for another term as deputy representative.

In 1930 she established her own publishing business. During World War II, Platou worked actively for the resistance movement, until she was exposed and had to flee to Sweden in 1942. Platou died in 1950; she was never married.
