= Valborg Platou =

Norwegian librarian, writer and art critic (1839–1928)

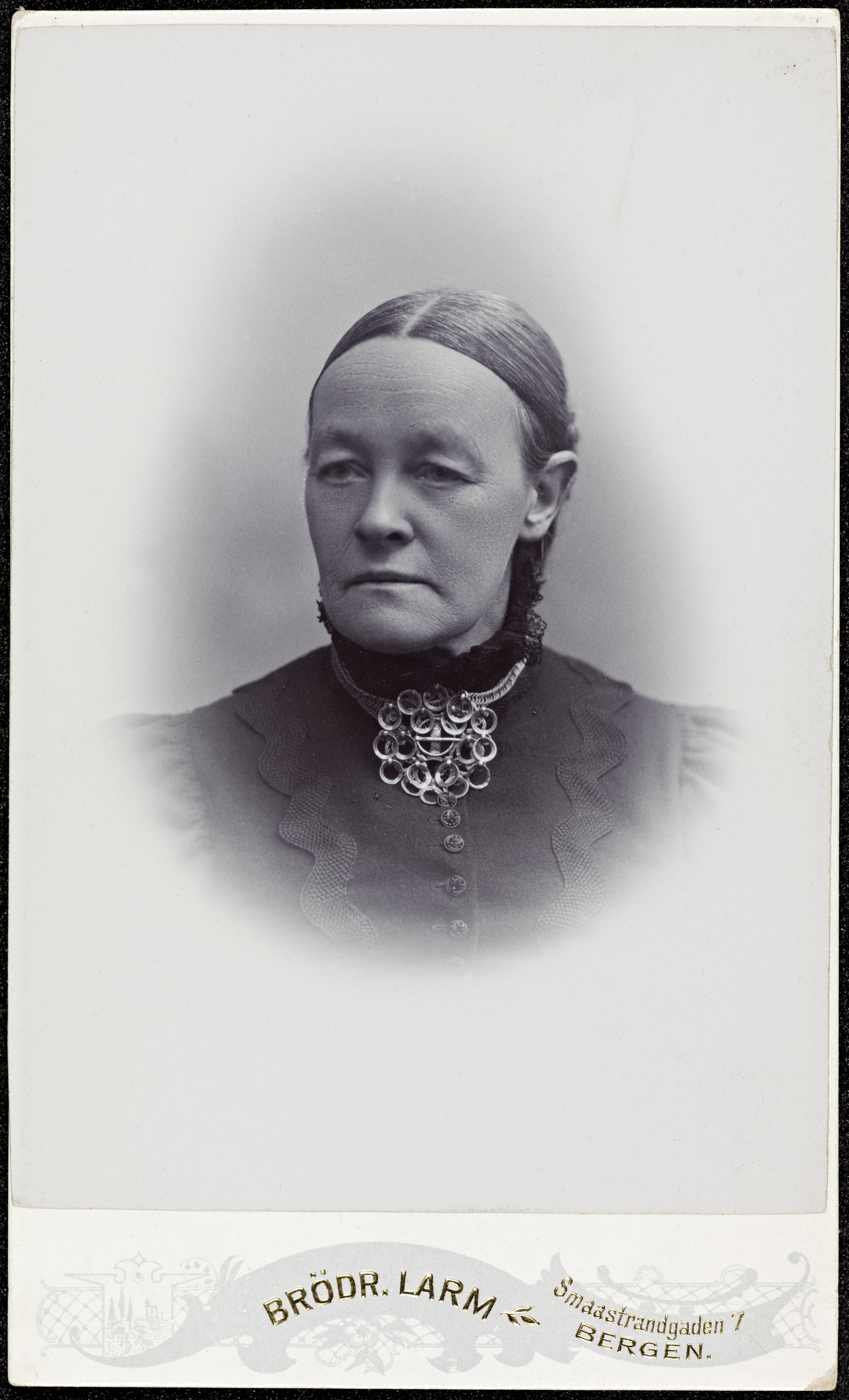
Valborg Platou

Valborg Platou (29 August 1839 – 29 December 1928) was a Norwegian librarian, writer and art critic. She was the first Norwegian female to become the chief librarian, a position that she held for 27 years at the Bergen Public Library.

== Biography ==
Born in Christiania on 29 August 1839, Valborg Platou was the daughter of Mayor Carl Nicolai Stoud Platou (1809–88) and his wife Christence Dorothea Plade Nielsen (1817–89).

Her family moved from Christiania to Bergen, where she completed her school education at Sophie Wever's women's institute. She learned number of foreign languages including German, French and English. Since her childhood, she showed interest in literary works and published a collection of poems. She also translated serials, and reviewed literature, theater and visual arts.

She started her professional career as a librarian in 1871 at the Bergen Public Library. From 1882 to 1909, she served as a chief librarian at Bergen public library and introduced number of reforms for the library's growth.

She worked as a cultural journalist, and associated with number of newspapers in Norway including De Bergenske Adressecontoirs-Efterretninger and Bergens Aftenblad.

In 1909 she received the King's Medal of Merit in gold, which is ranked eighth in the ranking of Orders, decorations, and medals of Norway. She never married.

She died in Bergen on 29 December 1928.
