= Kon-Tiki2 =

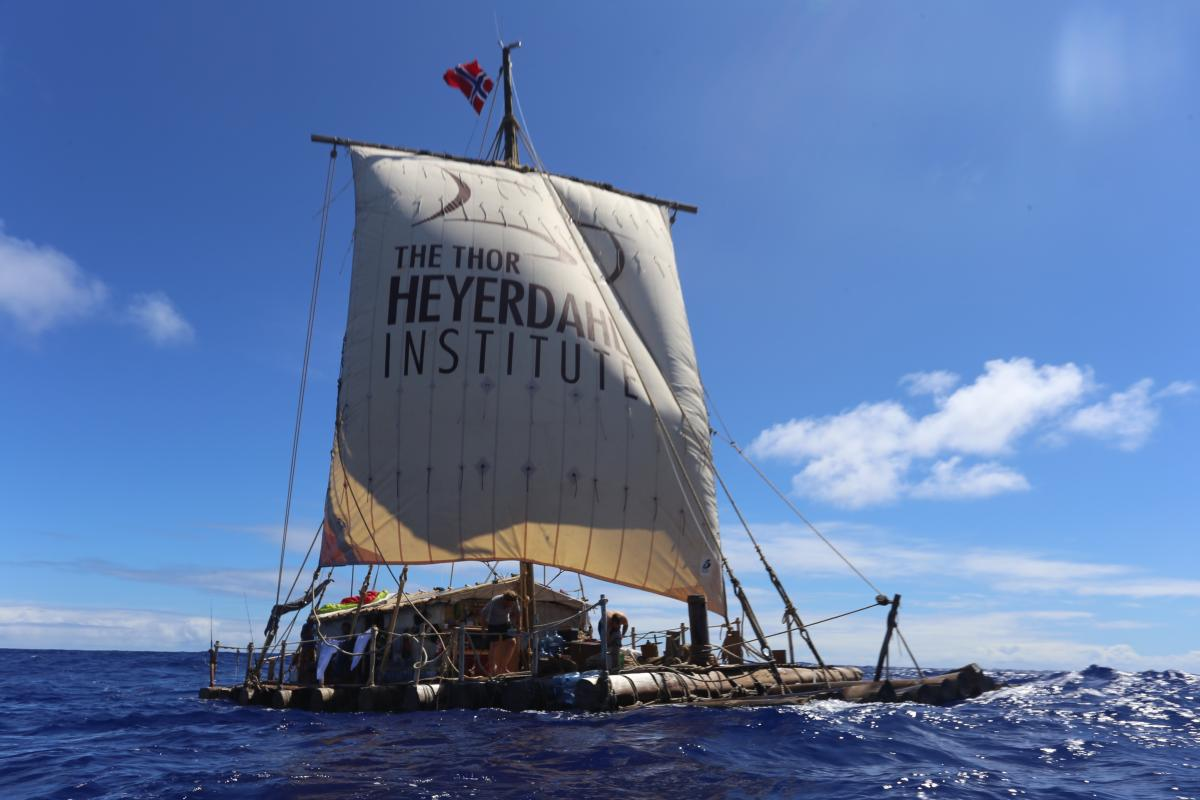
Balsa raft Tupaq Yupanqui sailing from Peru to Easter Island December 2015

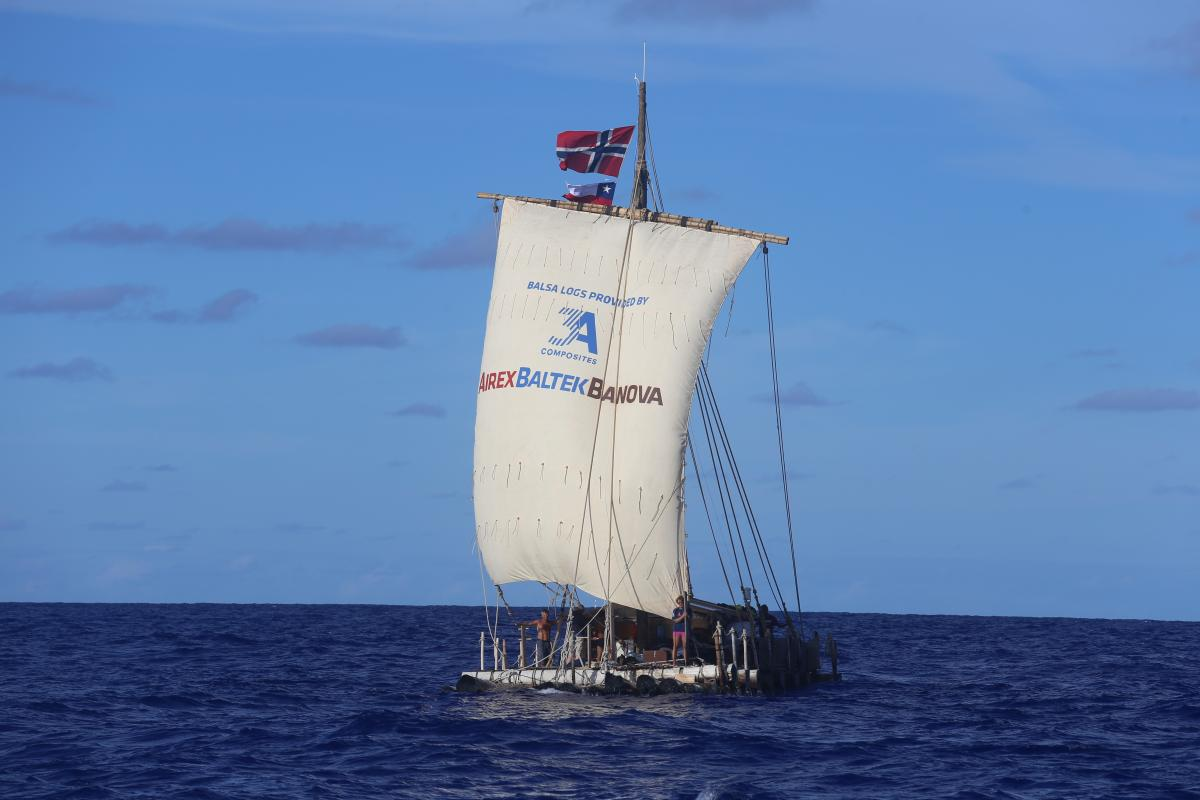
Balsa raft Rahiti Tane sailing from Peru to Easter Island December 2015

The Kon-Tiki2 Expedition built and sailed two balsawood rafts from Peru to Easter Island in 2015. The goal of the expedition was to show that balsawood rafts can be sailed across long distances, and to collect scientific data in the southeast Pacific. The expedition built two rafts in 30 days and went on to sail the rafts more than 2000 nautical miles before reaching Easter Island after 43 days at sea. No other balsa rafts have sailed to Easter Island in modern times.

On the return journey from Easter Island to South America, the expedition was terminated after 71 days at sea due to difficult weather conditions. By then, the rafts had sailed halfway to South America. All crew members were taken aboard a Japanese freighter, and later transported to shore by the Chilean Armada. Expedition leader Torgeir Higraff chose to terminate the expedition to avoid risking the life of crew members.

The expedition built and sailed two balsawood rafts: Rahiti Tane and Tupac Yupanqui. The rafts were similar to the Kon-Tiki raft built by Thor Heyerdahl in 1947. Like the Kon-Tiki, Rahiti Tane and Tupac Yupanqui were built from balsawood transported from Ecuador to SIMA, the Peruvian Army's shipyard in Callao, Lima. However, the Kon-Tiki2 rafts were different in several respects: Kon-Tiki had a rudder, while the Kon-Tiki2 rafts were steered by guara boards which allowed the rafts to be sailed in crosswinds. The Kon-Tiki2 rafts had modern satellite equipment on board, in addition to solar panels and scientific equipment.

The Kon-Tiki2 Expedition had crew from many nations: Norway, Russia, UK, Mexico, New Zealand, Sweden, and Peru. Øyvin Lauten and Kari Skår Dahl were captains on the first leg, while Signe Meling and Ola Borgfjord were captains on the second leg. Cecilie Mauritzen was the chief scientist and Håkon Wium Lie was the CTO. On the return journey, Pedro De La Torre was responsible for the technical equipment and the scientific work.
