= Eduard Ingriš =

American classical composer

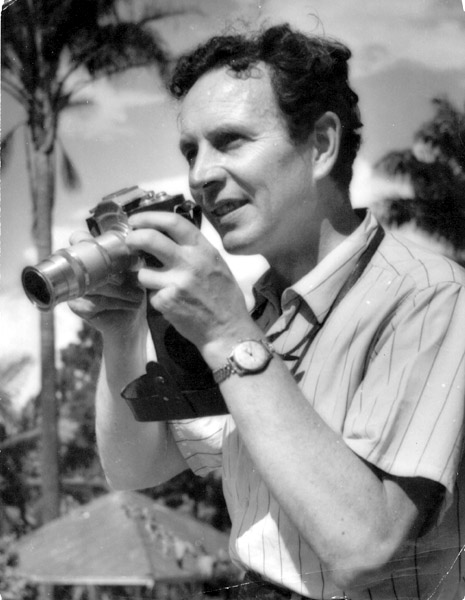
Eduard Ingriš

Eduard Ingriš (Czech pronunciation: [ˈɪŋɡrɪʃ]) (February 11, 1905 – January 11, 1991) was a Czech-American composer, photographer, conductor and adventurer. During a long and varied career, he arranged the "Beer Barrel Polka"; composed the operetta The Capricious Mirror; and worked on films including Jungle Sabotage and The Old Man and the Sea as a cameraman. He also filmed, produced and composed music for his own adventure films, including From High C's to High Seas, which depicted the Kantuta expeditions, his two attempts to cross the Pacific Ocean on a balsa raft, one of which was successful.

== Biography ==
Born in Zlonice in Bohemia (then Austria-Hungary, now Czech Republic), Ingriš left Czechoslovakia in 1947 for South America, living in Brazil and Peru. In 1955 and 1959 he organized the Kantuta and Kantuta II raft voyages and sailed across the Pacific, in similar style to Thor Heyerdahl's Kon-tiki.

While Ingriš' travels spanned the globe and his talents led him through several careers, his first love was always music. He wrote the first arrangement of the famous "Beer Barrel Polka", after Jaromír Vejvoda came upon the melody and sought Ingriš' help in refining it. This was shortly before the outbreak of World War II. The piece was brought to England by Czech pilots flying for the Royal Air Force, became an overnight hit there, and subsequently was popularized in America.

Ingriš received degrees from the Charles University in Prague and the Prague Conservatory. He composed about 1,000 works, including forty-eight operettas and musical comedies, full opera and symphonies. At nineteen he composed the operetta "The Capricious Mirror", which played five years in Prague — a record-setting 1,600 performances (surpassing records of New York's Broadway). He directed the Symphony Orchestra of Prague and scored 11 European movies. He also conducted the National Symphony Orchestra of Peru.

As a camera man, Ingriš worked for film studios in Czechoslovakia, Germany, and Peru. He filmed a series of thirteen travel and adventure films for the American Production Company, Hollywood. For Movius Productions (Hollywood), he filmed "Jungle Sabotage", a movie starring Pilar Pallete, wife of actor John Wayne. He assisted author Ernest Hemingway in filming The Old Man and the Sea, based upon Hemingway's Pulitzer Prize-winning novel. He also wrote music to another film, produced by Steel Productions in Hollywood, called "The Gallant One".

Ingriš' own high adventure films "From High C's to High Seas", depicting his two balsa raft expeditions across the Pacific, "Untamed Amazon" and "Sailing the South Seas" of his return voyage on a ketch from Tahiti to Lima, Peru, are scored with his own compositions, and were personally presented on lecture tours for several years throughout USA, Canada and Hawaii and later transferred to videos.

Ingriš resided at South Lake Tahoe, California where he died in 1991 at age 86. His remains were moved to his native village, Zlonice.
