= Poštovice =

- Municipality
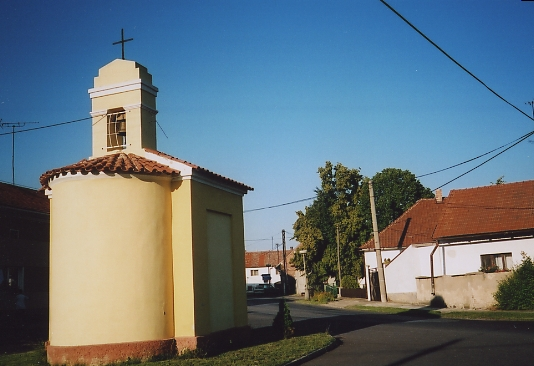
- Chapel in the centre of Poštovice

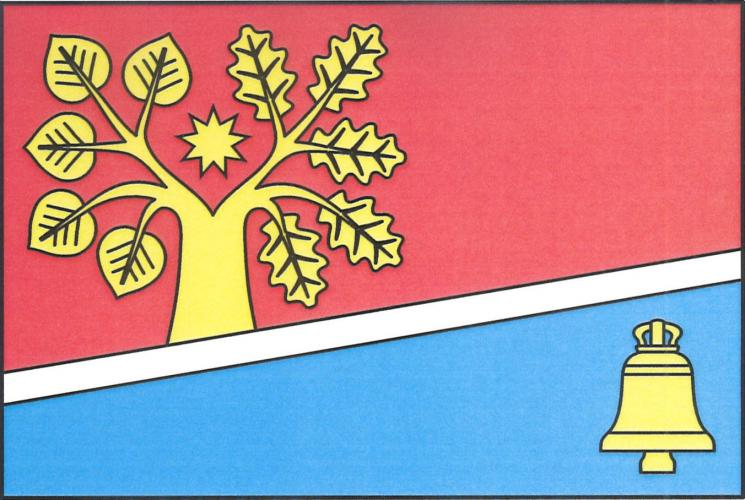
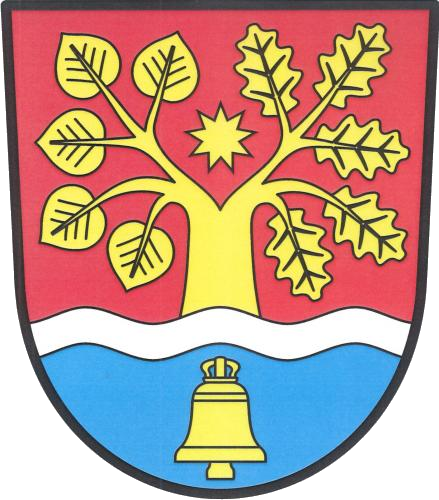
- Flag Coat of arms

- Location in the Czech Republic
- Coordinates: 50°18′46″N 14°8′17″E
- Country: Czech Republic
- Region: Central Bohemian
- District: Kladno
- First mentioned: 1186

Area
  - Total: 4.70 km^{2} (1.81 sq mi)
- Elevation: 205 m (673 ft)

Population (2026-01-01)
  - Total: 221
  - Density: 47.0/km^{2} (122/sq mi)
- Time zone: UTC+1 (CET)
  - Summer (DST): UTC+2 (CEST)
- Postal code: 273 72
- Website: www.postovice.cz

Poštovice is a municipality and village in Kladno District in the Central Bohemian Region of the Czech Republic. It has about 200 inhabitants.

== Etymology ==
The initial name of the settlement was Pošitovice or Požitovice. The name was derived from the personal name Pošit or Požit, meaning "the village of Pošit's/Požit's people".

== Geography ==
Poštovice is located about 19 kilometres (12 mi) north of Kladno and 30 km (19 mi) northwest of Prague. It lies in a flat agricultural landscape in the Lower Ohře Table. The highest point is at 260 m (853 ft) above sea level. The stream Vranský potok flows through the municipality.

== History ==
The first written mention of Poštovice is from 1186. In the 14th century, the village was divided into several parts, which had different owners. Some of the parts were owned by local noblemen and some of then were a property of the monastery in Roudnice nad Labem. After the Hussite Wars, when the monastery was destroyed, Poštovice were united and owned by various lesser noblemen. In 1654, the village was annexed to the Zlonice estate. From 1721, the estate was owned by the Kinsky family.

== Demographics ==
Historical population

Year	Pop.	±%
1869	385	—
1880	380	−1.3%
1890	460	+21.1%
1900	495	+7.6%
1910	455	−8.1%

Year	Pop.	±%
1921	398	−12.5%
1930	370	−7.0%
1950	255	−31.1%
1961	234	−8.2%
1970	241	+3.0%

Year	Pop.	±%
1980	242	+0.4%
1991	187	−22.7%
2001	193	+3.2%
2011	257	+33.2%
2021	243	−5.4%

Source: Censuses

== Transport ==
There are no railways or major roads passing through the municipality.

== Sights ==
The only protected cultural monument in the municipality is a Baroque statue of Saint Donatus, dating from 1724. In the centre of the village is a chapel.
