= Kantuta Expeditions =

The Kantuta expeditions were two separate Pacific Ocean expeditions on balsa rafts led by the Czech explorer and adventurer Eduard Ingriš in 1955 and 1959, inspired by Thor Heyerdahl's Kon-Tiki expedition. The goal of Ingriš's Kantuta expeditions was to repeat the success of the Kon-Tiki and confirm Heyerdahl's theory about the migration of early South Americans to Polynesia.

== First expedition ==
The first voyage, which Ingriš and his crew attempted on the raft La Kantuta, sailed from Talara, Peru on 4 December 1955. It ended in failure 90 days later. Straying too far north, the raft entered the equatorial doldrums and became stuck going round and round in a 600-mile-wide gyre. For six weeks, the crew weathered starvation and resentment, until they were finally rescued by a United States naval vessel returning from Antarctica.

== Second expedition ==
Ingriš spent the next three years building La Kantuta II. On 12 April 1959, the raft was towed from Callao, Peru, to the Humboldt Current. Four months later, Ingriš and Joaquin Guerrero completed the expedition successfully, despite two of the new crew members having abandoned ship, taking the water supply with them. Having sailed a distance of 6,000 miles, La Kantuta II finally smashed onto the reef at Mataiva, an atoll north of Tahiti, the last island in the ocean current's path.

== See also ==
- Pre-Columbian rafts
- William Willis, also rafted across the Pacific
