= Torgeir Sæverud Higraff =

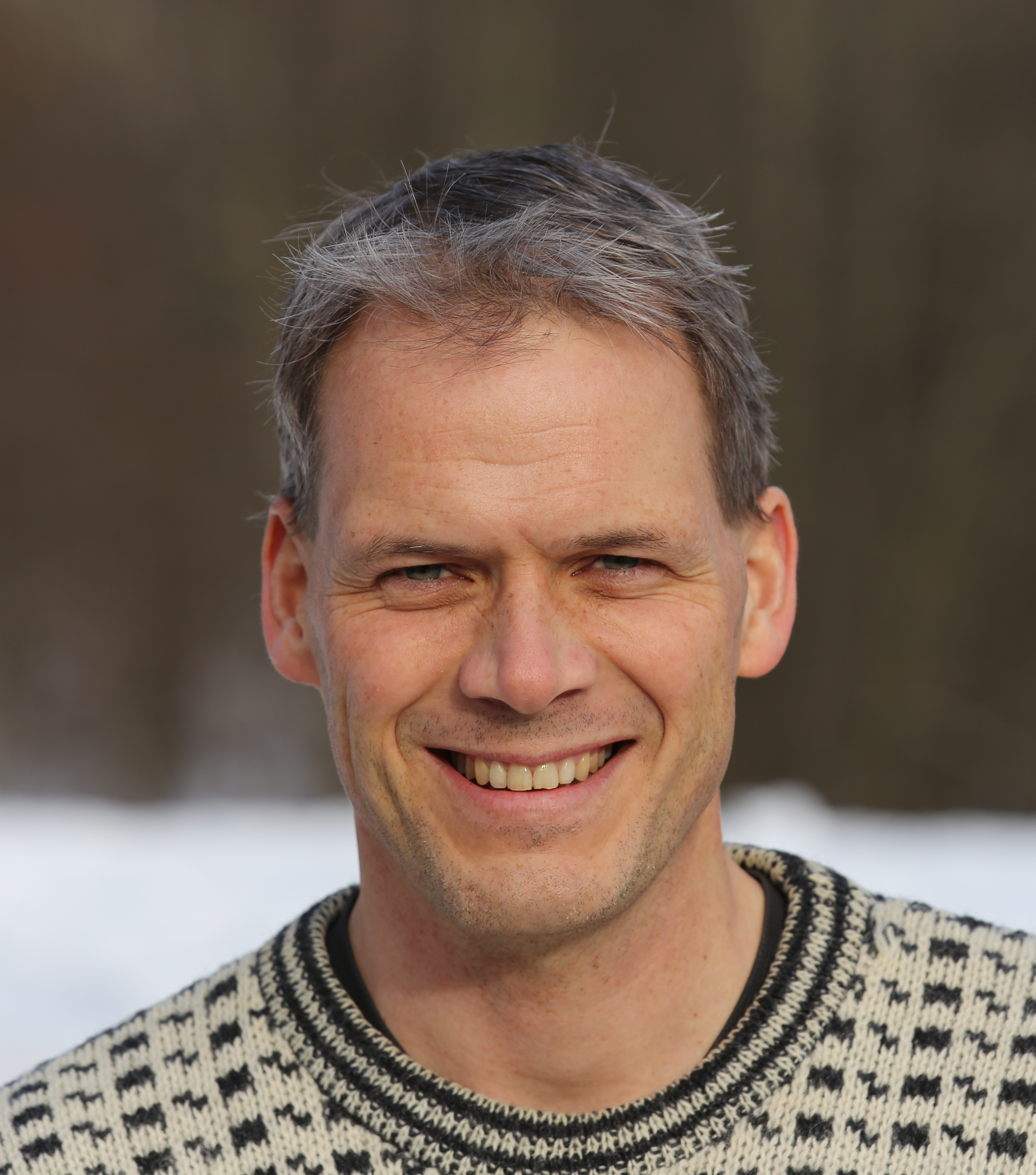
- Higraff in 2015
- Born: 1972 (age 52–53); Sørreisa, Norway
- Occupations: explorer, teacher, author
- Known for: Tangaroa expedition

Torgeir Sæverud Higraff is an explorer, teacher and author with special interest in prehistoric transoceanic contact. Like Thor Heyerdahl, Higraff combines history, anthropology and traditional knowledge with expeditions. In 2002, the year Heyerdahl died, Higraff decided to recreate the Kon-Tiki expedition, and in 2006 the Tangaroa Expedition sailed from Peru to Raiatea in eastern Polynesia. Tangaroa outperformed Kon-Tiki by using an improved sail rig and active use of the guara centerboards.

In 2014, Higraff proposed another expedition: to sail roundtrip from Peru to Easter Island. The Kon-Tiki2 expedition built two rafts in Callao in 2015 and reached Easter Island after 43 days at sea, becoming the first rafts to have sailed to Easter Island in modern times. The return journey proved more difficult due to unusual weather patterns and the expedition was terminated halfway between Easter Island and South America.

== See also ==
- Pre-Columbian rafts
