= John Haslett =

John Haslett may refer to:

- John Haslet (c. 1727 – 1777), American Presbyterian minister and soldier
- John F. Haslett, American writer
