= Zlončice =

- Municipality
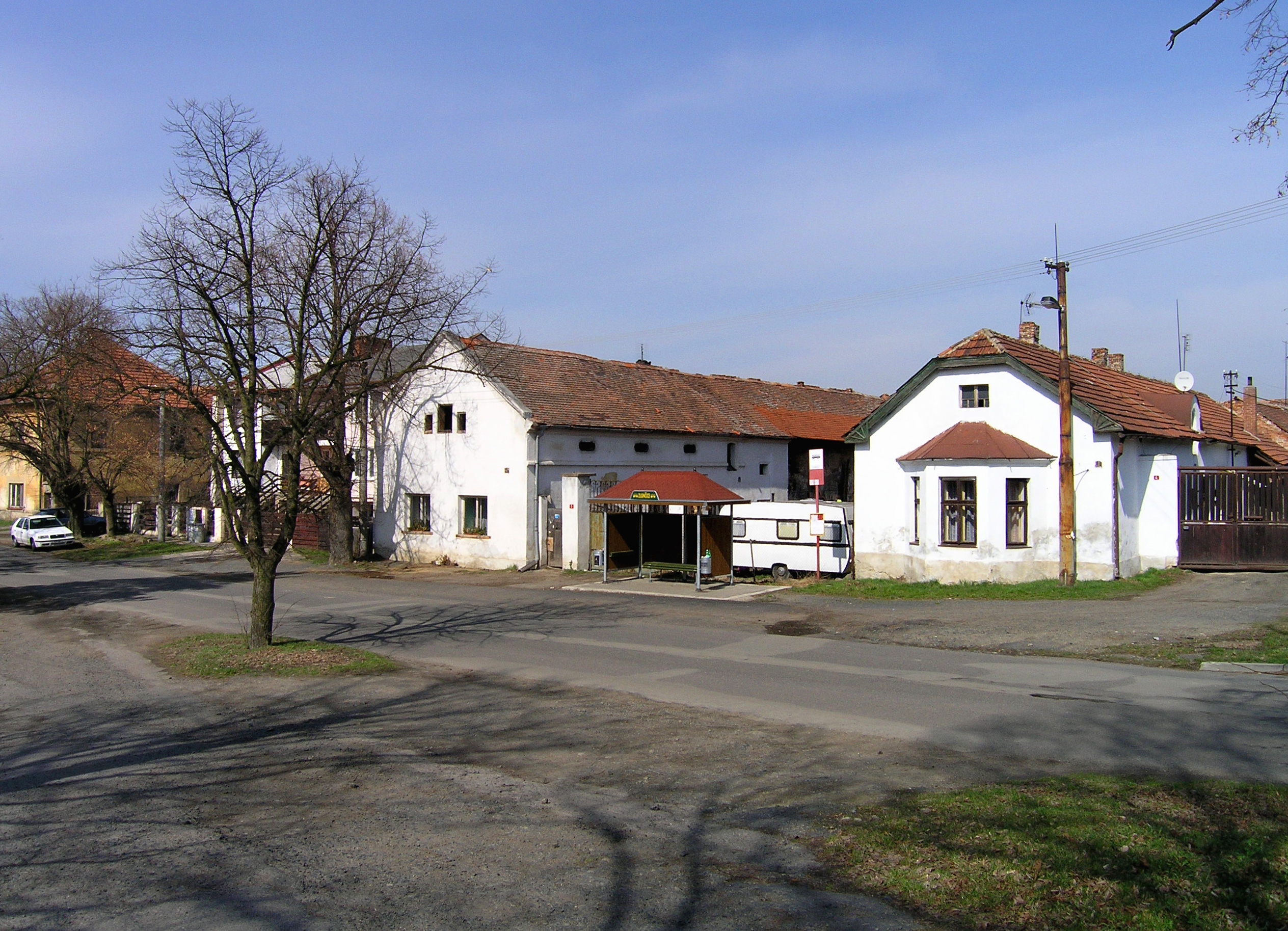
- Centre of Zlončice

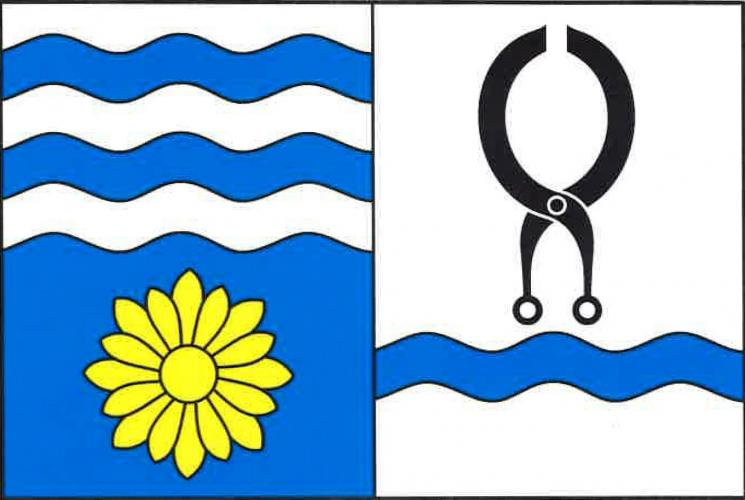
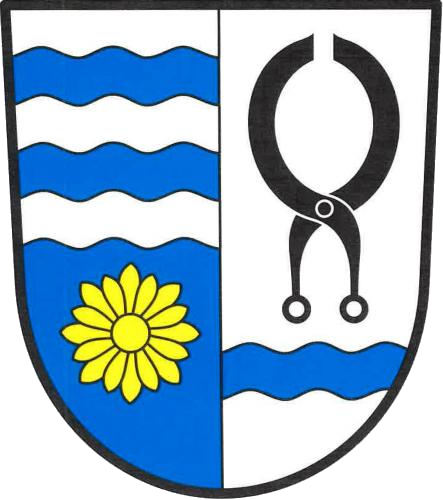
- Flag Coat of arms

- Location in the Czech Republic
- Coordinates: 50°13′44″N 14°21′28″E
- Country: Czech Republic
- Region: Central Bohemian
- District: Mělník
- First mentioned: 1052

Area
  - Total: 4.66 km^{2} (1.80 sq mi)
- Elevation: 232 m (761 ft)

Population (2026-01-01)
  - Total: 613
  - Density: 132/km^{2} (341/sq mi)
- Time zone: UTC+1 (CET)
  - Summer (DST): UTC+2 (CEST)
- Postal code: 278 01
- Website: www.obeczloncice.cz

Zlončice is a municipality and village in Mělník District in the Central Bohemian Region of the Czech Republic. It has about 600 inhabitants.

== Administrative division ==
Zlončice consists of two municipal parts (in brackets population according to the 2021 census):

- Zlončice (606)
- Dolánky (45)

== Etymology ==
The initial name of the village was Znojčice. The name was derived from the personal name Znoj, meaning "the village of Znoj's people". Due to the proximity of the similarly named village of Zlonice, the name was distorted to Zlončice.

== Geography ==
Zlončice is located about 13 kilometres (8 mi) north of Prague. It lies in the Prague Plateau. It is situated on a river terrace on the right bank of the Vltava River.

== History ==
The first written mention of Zlončice is from 1052.

A part of Zlončice was badly damaged by the 2002 European floods.

== Demographics ==
Historical population

| Year | Pop. | ±% |
|---|---|---|
| 1869 | 216 | — |
| 1880 | 276 | +27.8% |
| 1890 | 329 | +19.2% |
| 1900 | 337 | +2.4% |
| 1910 | 383 | +13.6% |

| Year | Pop. | ±% |
|---|---|---|
| 1921 | 293 | −23.5% |
| 1930 | 375 | +28.0% |
| 1950 | 260 | −30.7% |
| 1961 | 304 | +16.9% |
| 1970 | 213 | −29.9% |

| Year | Pop. | ±% |
|---|---|---|
| 1980 | 199 | −6.6% |
| 1991 | 221 | +11.1% |
| 2001 | 176 | −20.4% |
| 2011 | 541 | +207.4% |
| 2021 | 651 | +20.3% |

Source: Censuses

== Transport ==
There are no railways or major roads passing through the municipality.

== Sights ==
There are no protected cultural monuments in the municipality.
