= Balsa (ship) =

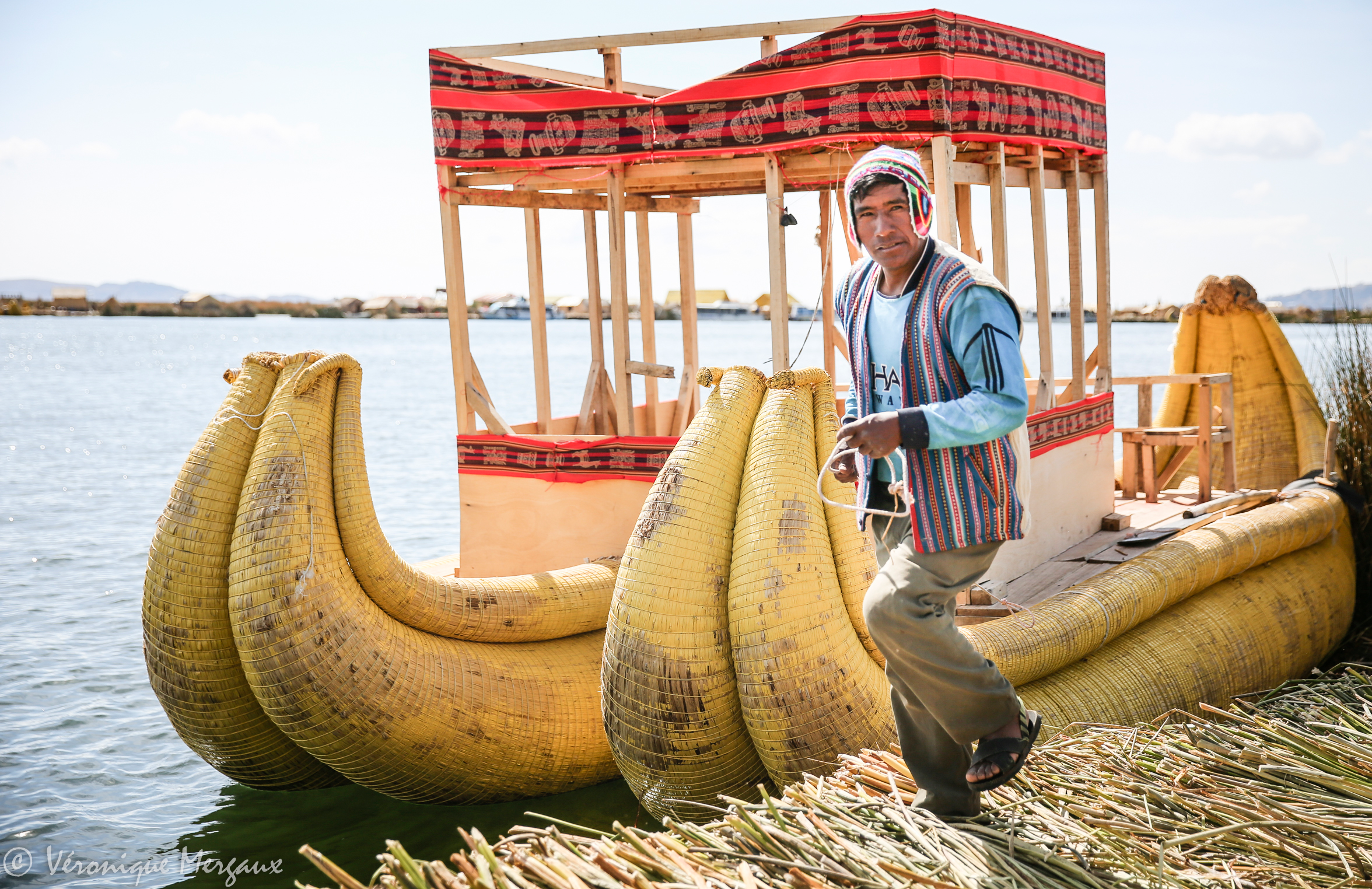
Reed boat in Lake Titicaca.

A balsa is a boat or ship built by various pre-Columbian South American civilizations constructed from woven reeds of the totora bulrush. They varied in size from small canoe sized personal fishing boats to large ships up to 30 metres long. They are still used on Lake Titicaca in Peru and Bolivia.

This term is also used by California archaeologists and anthropologists to refer to the woven and tied tule reed canoes used by the Native Californians in both pre-Columbian and historical eras.

== See also ==
- Abora
- Kantuta Expeditions
- Kon-Tiki
- Reed boat
- Schoenoplectus acutus - common name tule
