= Herman Watzinger =

Norwegian resistance member (1916–1986)

- Born: April 20, 1916; Wiesbaden, Germany
- Died: 1986 (aged 69–70); Peru
- Occupation: Engineer
- Known for: Crew member on the Kon-Tiki

Herman Watzinger was a Norwegian engineer in the area of cooling technique from NTH (now NTNU) in Trondheim and a crewmember on the Kon-Tiki expedition. He was also a Milorg member during the Second World War operation Polar Bear II, which was brought to Trondheim by Captain Leif Hauge. (Note: Polar Bear II was the codename for the plan and protection of harbors and port installations in Norway. A total of 123 officers were with the group. → Ward, Geoff Ward. "Erik Gjems-Onstad". Norway: War Resistance Peace. wwiinorge.com. Archived from the original on 26 April 2012.)

== Biography ==
Herman Watzinger was born on 20 April 1916 in Wiesbaden, Germany.

He then continued with doctoral studies at NTH (NTNU), which was cancelled because of World War II, and applied for a job in the US and sought a visa to the US. He met Thor Heyerdahl in New York City, where he was asked to participate in the construction of the Kon-Tiki raft and become a member of the expedition. On board the raft, where he was second in command, he was responsible for meteorological and hydrographic measurements.

He moved to Lima, Peru, in 1950. On 25 September 1952 he was awarded the Orden al Mérito por Servicios Distinguidos by the Ministry of Foreign Relations of Peru. (Note: No. de Orden: 63, Caballero.) From 1970, where he worked at Lima as head of fisheries, projects and advisor in freezing techniques for WR Grace & Co and Atlas. Watzinger was also the head of a Norwegian-owned fish meal factory in Pisagua, northern Chile, with exports of fish meal to the U.S. and Europe. After that he became director of the FAO fishery Industries Division and later, of the Fisheries Department in Rome from 1970, and Deputy director general of the FAO (UN Food and Agriculture) in Rome, Italy. He graduated from the NTH in hydrology and thermodynamics as his major.

He was the son of Adolf Watzinger, a long-time professor of mechanical engineering at the NTNU university in Trondheim, Norway. He died in Peru in 1986.
