= Tangaroa Expedition =

Tangaroa Expedition Raft, 2006

The Tangaroa Expedition of 2006 closely resembled the Kon-Tiki expedition sailing a balsa raft from Peru to Polynesia. Tangaroa outperformed Kon-Tiki by having an improved sail rig and by actively using guaras (centerboards). As such, the expedition represents a scientific continuation of Thor Heyerdahl's experiments in recreated maritime technology.

The raft was named after the Māori sea-god Tangaroa. Based on records of ancient Andean vessels, the raft used a relatively sophisticated square sail that allowed sailing into the wind, or tacking. It was 16 m (52 ft) high by 8 m (26 ft) wide. The raft also included a set of modern navigation and communication equipment, including solar panels, portable computers, and desalination equipment. The crew posted to their website.

Tangaroa's six-man crew was led by Norwegian Torgeir Higraff and included Olav Heyerdahl, grandson of Thor Heyerdahl, Bjarne Krekvik (captain), Øyvin Lauten (executive officer), Swedish Anders Berg (photographer) and Peruvian Roberto Sala. Tangaroa was launched on the same day that Kon-Tiki had been—April 28—and it reached its destination on July 7, which was 30 days faster than Heyerdahl's Kon-Tiki which had taken 101 days for the voyage. Tangaroa's speed was credited to the proper use of the quara centerboards in navigation. Heyerdahl had not known how to correctly use them.

A documentary, The Tangaroa Expedition (Ekspedisionen Tangaroa), was produced by Videomaker (Norwegian), 2007, shot by photographers Anders Berg and Jenssen.

== See also ==
- Pre-Columbian rafts
