= Pre-Columbian rafts =

Boats in pre-Spanish and Portuguese South America

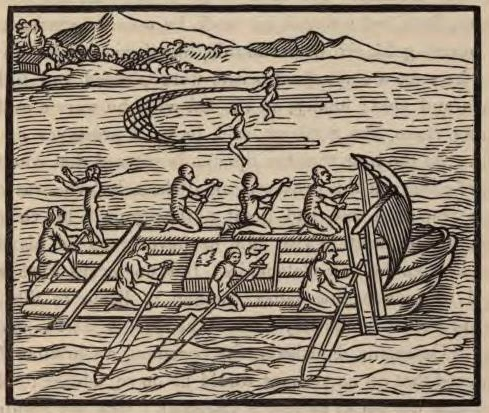
Sixteenth-century log rafts off Puerto Viejo, Ecuador (1857 reprint of the 1565 original).

Pre-Columbian rafts plied the Pacific coast of South America for trade from about 100 BCE, and possibly much earlier. The 16th-century descriptions by the Spanish of the rafts used by Native Americans along the seacoasts of Peru and Ecuador has incited speculation about the seamanship of the Indigenous, the seaworthiness of their rafts, and the possibility that they undertook long ocean-going voyages. None of the prehistoric rafts have survived and the exact characteristics of their construction and the geographical extent of their voyages are uncertain.

It is likely that traders using rafts, constructed of balsa wood logs, voyaged as far as Mexico and introduced metallurgy to the civilizations of that country. Some scholars and adventurers of the 20th and 21st century (most notably Thor Heyerdahl) who reached Polynesia on the Kon-Tiki raft have asserted that the rafts and their crews journeyed thousands of miles across the Pacific to Polynesia. Several other people and groups have also built rafts based on prehistoric models and undertaken trans-Pacific voyages.

Balsa is the Spanish word for raft. The use of rafts for commerce on the coasts of Peru and Ecuador, from northern Chile to southern Colombia, continued until the late 19th century, long after the Spanish conquest of the Inca Empire (1532 to 1572), although the fidelity of these rafts to their prehistoric ancestors is uncertain.

== Background ==
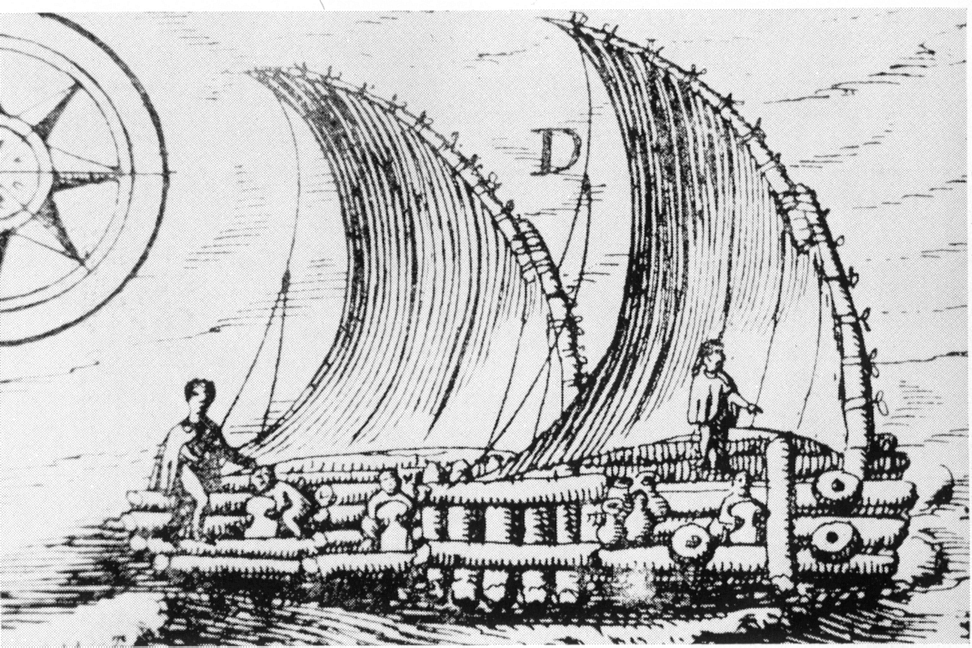
A drawing of a raft (balsa) near Guayaquil, Ecuador in 1748. The drawing resembles the description given by 16th-century Spanish explorers of the rafts used by Indians.

In 1526, a Spanish ship captained by Bartolomé Ruiz, Francisco Pizarro's chief navigator, ventured southward down the west coast of South America, the first Old World ship known to have explored this coastline. Off the coast of Ecuador, Ruiz encountered a Native American raft, being the first encounter between the Spanish and the Inca's vassals. A contemporary account of the encounter is:

[The Spanish] captured a ship [raft] with as many as 20 men aboard of whom 11 threw themselves into the water. [Ruiz] put the remainder of the crew onshore except for three whom he kept as interpreters. He treated them well. The ship he took had a capacity of up to 30 toneles [25 metric tons]. The keel was made of canes [balsa logs] as thick as posts bound together with ropes of what they call henequen, which is like hemp. It had an upper deck made of lighter canes, tied with the same kind of ropes. The people and their cargo remained dry on the upper deck, as the lower logs were awash in the seawater. The ship had masts of good wood and lateen-rigged sails of cotton, the same as our ships, and good rigging with henequen ropes. It carried stone weights like barber's grinding stones as anchors.

The chronicler, Francisco de Xerez, said that the raft carried a cargo of "silver objects, tiaras, crowns, bands, tweezers and bells, all of this they brought to exchange for some [sea] shells." Other contemporary chroniclers gave additional details about the rafts. "They set a mast in the largest log in the middle, hoist and sail, and navigate all along this coast. They are very safe vessels because they cannot sink or capsize, since the water washes through them."

== Construction and navigation ==
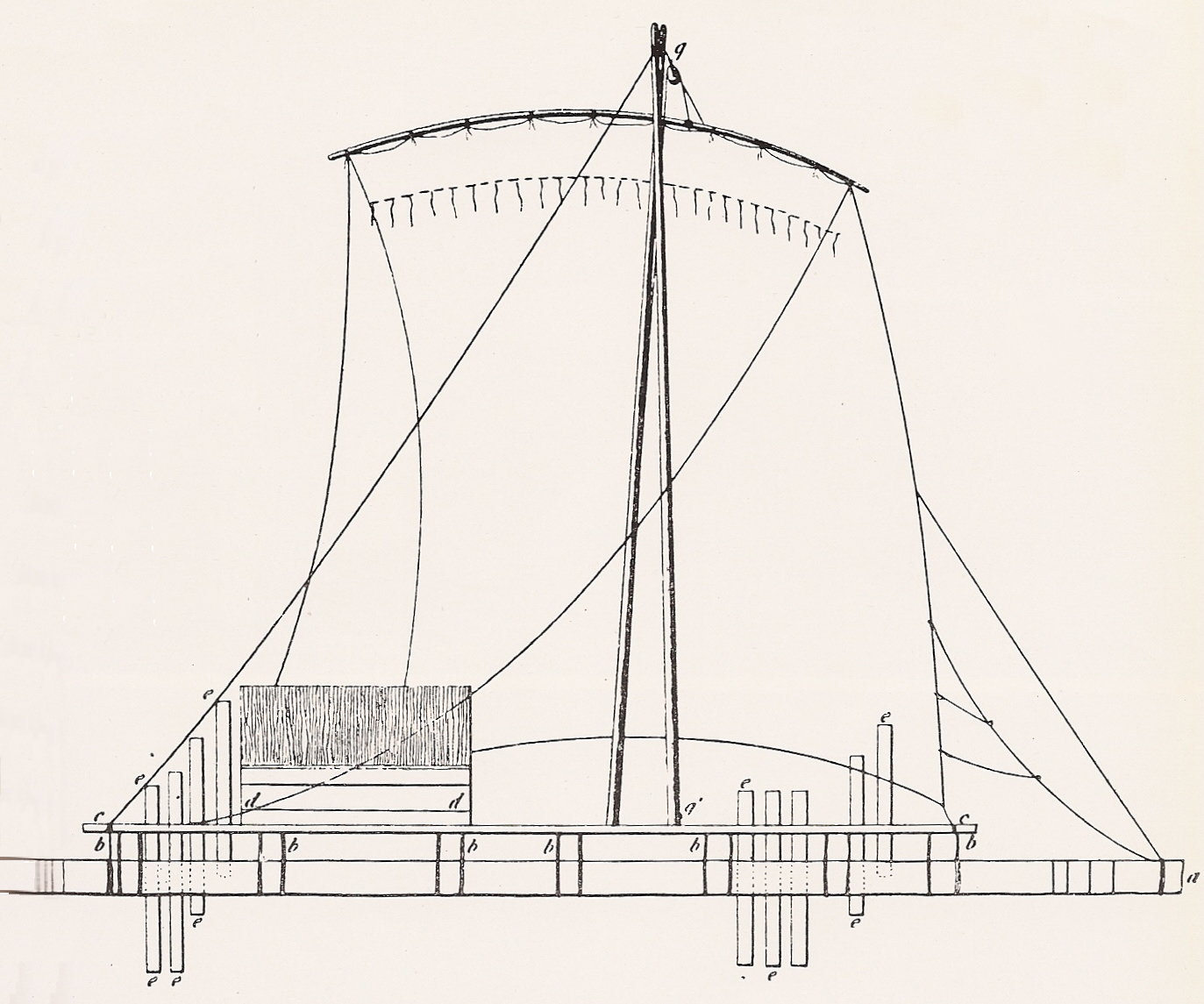
A Peruvian raft in 1841.

=== Balsa logs ===
Logs from the balsa tree (Ochroma lagopus) are distinguished by their light weight and large size (up to 90 centimetres (35 in) in diameter). A tree of the tropical forest, the balsa tree did not naturally occur on the arid coasts of Peru and southern Ecuador. The source of balsa logs for rafts was the valley of the Guayas River, north of the city of Guayaquil, Ecuador. This area is still the principal source of balsa wood for international trade.

The long-term buoyancy of balsa logs has been called into question. Prior to the voyage across the Pacific Ocean of the Kon-Tiki in 1947, scholars often argued that balsa logs absorb water so quickly that long voyages were infeasible. Heyerdahl, however, used green balsa wood logs for a voyage of 101 days on the Kon-Tiki. Other studies have also indicated that dry balsa logs can remain afloat for extended periods of time.

Rafts were always constructed of an odd number of balsa logs, usually numbering 3 to 11, with the center log being the longest and the others tapering down in length. The Spanish said the rafts were in the shape of the extended fingers of a hand. The large balsa logs, lashed together with henequen fiber, formed the main deck of a raft. Seawater passed freely between and over the logs making it very difficult for rafts to be swamped by heavy seas.

Atop the large balsa logs was a platform or multiple platforms, constructed of cane or bamboo which kept the cargo and passengers dry. During historic (and probably pre-historic) times the platform might include a hut to shelter the passengers and crew and a fire pit for cooking.

=== Sails and masts ===
The use of sails on pre-Columbian rafts has been disputed by a few scholars who have speculated that the Spaniards introduced the use of sails or that the technology for using sails derived from the Spanish but was adopted by the Indians before the physical arrival of the Spanish on the Ecuadorian coast. However, the chronicler of Ruiz's voyage in 1526 is clear that the raft he saw used sails and this voyage was only 13 years after the first known Spanish sighting of the Pacific Ocean in Panama, more than 1,200 kilometres (750 mi) north. Another contemporary author said that sails had been used on rafts "since time immemorial."

There is also controversy about whether the sails used were square or lateen (triangular). Although square sails were later used, the earliest accounts describe triangular sails, probably two in number, fore and aft rigged with two masts. Engineering and stress studies indicate that the masts were curved and no longer than 7.5 metres (25 ft) and about 16 centimetres (6.3 in) in diameter. They may have been composed of two pieces of wood joined together. The wood used is unknown although modern reproductions have used mangrove wood, the mangrove being common along the Ecuadorian coast and the northern Peruvian coast of Piura and Tumbes.

=== Navigation ===
Pre-Columbian rafts were steered by a combination of adjusting the sails and the use of centerboards, called "guaras." These were boards typically about 60 centimetres (2.0 ft) wide inserted vertically into the sea between the balsa logs. On larger rafts there were three sets of guaras at the front, back, and the middle of the raft. Raising, lowering, or removing some of the guaras or moving them toward the bow or stern reduced or increased sub-surface tension and made it possible to steer the raft. Working in tandem with the sails, the guaras, according to an 1820 report, permitted the crew to undertake "all the maneuvers of a regularly built and well-rigged [sailing] vessel." The rafts could achieve a speed of 4 to 5 knots.

=== Size and cargo capacity ===
An engineering study concluded that ocean-going rafts ranged in size from 6 metres (20 ft) to 11 metres (36 ft) long and had a cargo capacity of 10 to 30 tons. The cargo capacity of the rafts declined as the balsa logs absorbed seawater. After 4 months in the water, the capacity of the largest rafts declined to 10 tons and after 8 months to 5 tons. Thus, a little more than 8 months in the water was the useful life of the rafts.

== Trade with Mexico ==
The antiquity of the use of sea-going rafts by the people of the Ecuadorian and Peruvian coasts has not been established as ancient balsa wood rafts have left few archaeological traces, but it appears that a maritime trading system from southern Colombia to northern Chile was established by about 100 BCE. The maritime trade had two centers: the northern coast of Ecuador and Chincha about 200 kilometres (120 mi) south of present-day Lima, Peru.

The sudden adoption of metallurgy in the civilizations of Mexico about 800 CE has led archaeologists to conclude that the technology was introduced, most likely by sea-going rafts, from the Ecuadorian coast of South America where metallurgy had been practiced for hundreds of years. Later advances in metallurgy in Mexico after 1200 CE resembled the metallurgy of the Chincha in Peru.

Scholars have calculated that a one-way trip from Ecuador to Mexico would have taken six to eight weeks, sailing at an average of 4 knots for 12 hours each day. To enjoy the best weather, traders would most likely leave Ecuador in early December and arrive in Mexico in late January. They would set off on the return in early March and arrive in Ecuador in early May. A raft could make two round trips before becoming waterlogged. Some sailors would remain longer in Mexico. One account from Spanish sources dated 1525 says that "Indians from certain islands in the south...brought exquisite products which they would trade for local products and...stay for five or six months until good weather occurred." It was during these trade voyages that South American sailors may have introduced metallurgy to Mexico.

The purported trade between Ecuador and Mexico consisted of luxury items, including Spondylus (spiny oyster) and Strombus (conch) shells, which were prominently traded from their origins in the warm ocean waters of Ecuador throughout the Andes and up and down the coasts of South America.

== Modern day re-creations ==
Since the voyage of the Kon-Tiki in 1947, there have been numerous crossings of the Pacific Ocean by raft from South America to Polynesia. In the 1990s, four attempts to sail a raft from Ecuador to Mexico failed, although one attempt reached Costa Rica. The various voyages have demonstrated the seaworthiness of prehistoric rafts and, in the words of an early Spaniard, that the Indians who sailed them were "great mariners." The Spanish colonists in Peru and Ecuador from the 16th to the 19th centuries relied on the Indians of the Peruvian and Ecuadorian coasts and their rafts for coastal trade.

== See also ==
- Chincha culture
- Dalca
- John F. Haslett
- Thor Heyerdahl
- Torgeir Sæverud Higraff
- Kantuta Expeditions
- Kon-Tiki expedition
- Tangaroa expedition
- Topa Inca Yupanqui
- Vital Alsar Pacific raft expeditions
- William Willis (sailor)
