= Kon-Tiki expedition =

1947 raft journey from South America to Polynesia

Kon-Tiki expedition
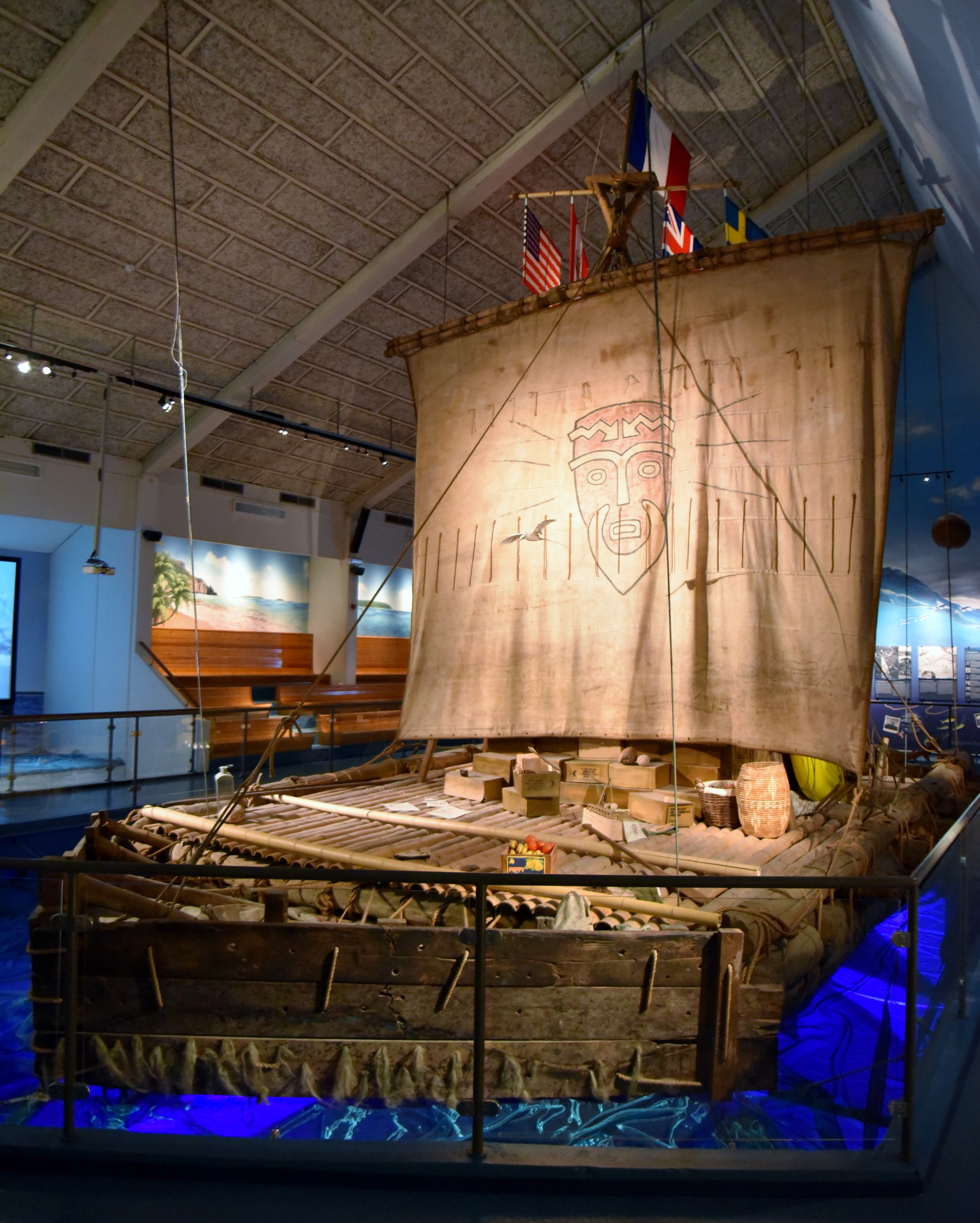

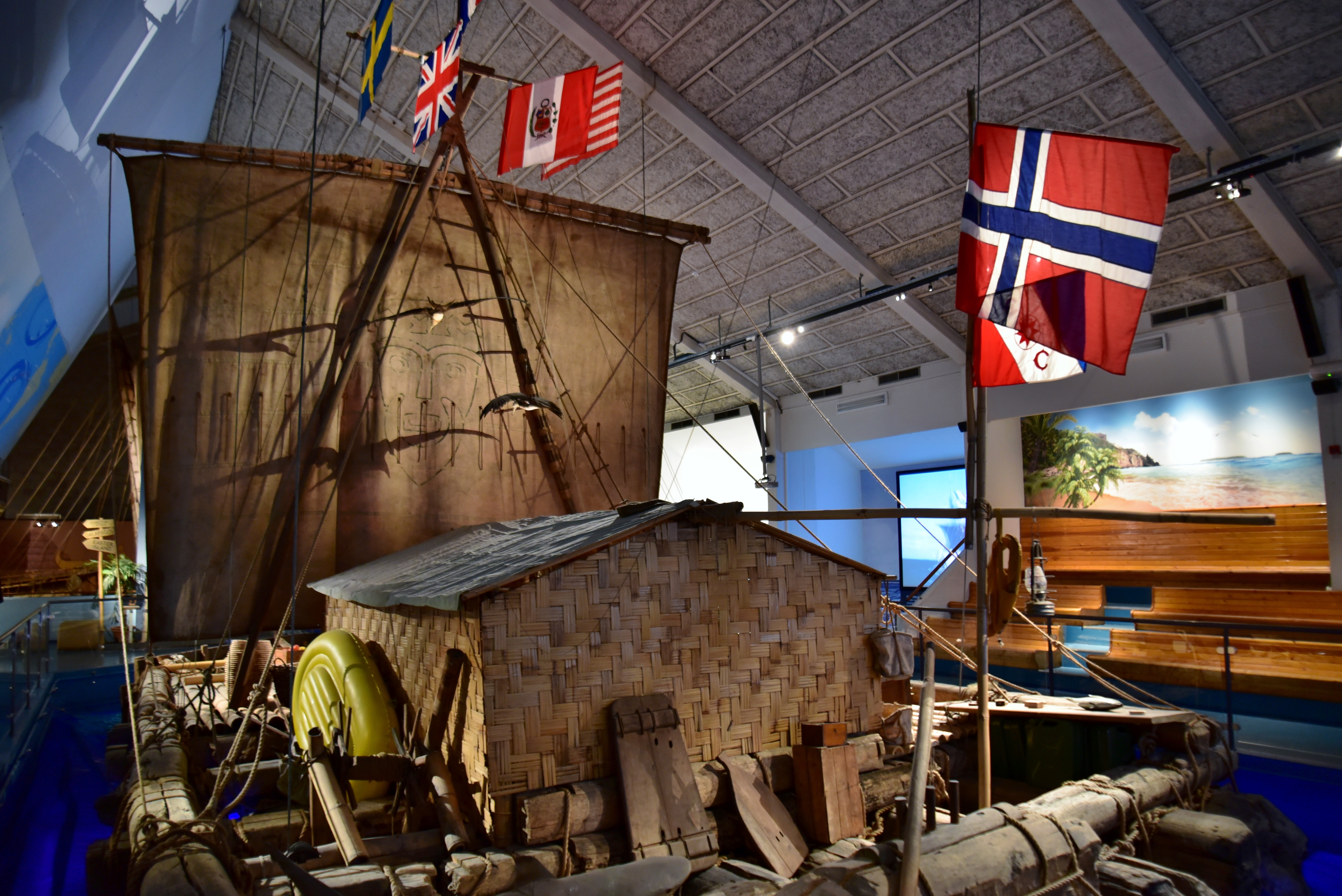
The Kon-Tiki raft at the Kon-Tiki Museum, Oslo

The Kon-Tiki expedition was a 1947 journey by raft across the Pacific Ocean from South America to the Polynesian islands, led by Norwegian explorer and ethnographer Thor Heyerdahl. The raft was named Kon-Tiki after the Inca god Viracocha, for whom "Kon-Tiki" was said to be an old name. Heyerdahl's book on the expedition was entitled The Kon-Tiki Expedition: By Raft Across the South Seas. A 1950 documentary film won the Academy Award for Best Documentary Feature. A 2012 dramatized feature film was nominated for the Academy Award for Best Foreign Language Film.

== Overview ==
The Kon-Tiki expedition was funded by private loans, along with donations of equipment from the United States Army. Heyerdahl and a small team went to Peru, where, with the help of dockyard facilities provided by the Peruvian authorities, they constructed the raft out of balsa logs and other native materials in an indigenous style as recorded in illustrations by Spanish conquistadores. The trip began on April 28, 1947. Heyerdahl and five companions sailed the raft for 101 days over 6,900 km (4,300 miles) across the Pacific Ocean before smashing into a reef at Raroia in the Tuamotus on August 7, 1947. The crew made successful landfall and all returned safely.

Heyerdahl believed that a sun-worshiping blond/red-haired and blue-eyed Caucasian people (whom he called the "Tiki people") from South America could have reached Polynesia during pre-Columbian times by drifting with the wind directions. His aim in mounting the Kon-Tiki expedition was to show, by using only the materials and technologies available to those people at the time, that there were no technical reasons to prevent them from having done so. Although the expedition carried some modern equipment, such as a radio, watches, charts, sextant, and metal knives, Heyerdahl argued they were incidental to the purpose of proving that the raft itself could make the journey.

Heyerdahl's full hypothesis that a white race reached Polynesia before the Polynesian people has been overwhelmingly rejected by research, even before the expedition. Heyerdahl also did not believe in the western origins of Polynesians, whom he believed were too primitive to sail against the wind and currents. Archaeological, linguistic, cultural, and genetic evidence supports a western origin for Polynesians, from Island Southeast Asia, using sophisticated multihull sailing technologies and navigation techniques during the Austronesian expansion. Although there is putative evidence of Polynesian contact with South America, it is more likely for Polynesians (who were already long-distance voyagers) to have been the ones to reach South America than the other way around.

Thor Heyerdahl's book about his experience became a bestseller. It was published in Norwegian in 1948 as The Kon-Tiki Expedition: By Raft Across the South Seas, later reprinted as Kon-Tiki: Across the Pacific in a Raft. It appeared with great success in English in 1950, also in many other languages. A documentary motion picture about the expedition, also called Kon-Tiki, was produced from a write-up and expansion of the crew's filmstrip notes and won an Academy Award in 1951. It was directed by Heyerdahl and edited by Olle Nordemar. The voyage was also chronicled in the documentary TV-series The Kon-Tiki Man: The Life and Adventures of Thor Heyerdahl, directed by Bengt Jonson.

The original Kon-Tiki raft is now on display in the Kon-Tiki Museum at Bygdøy in Oslo.

== Crew ==
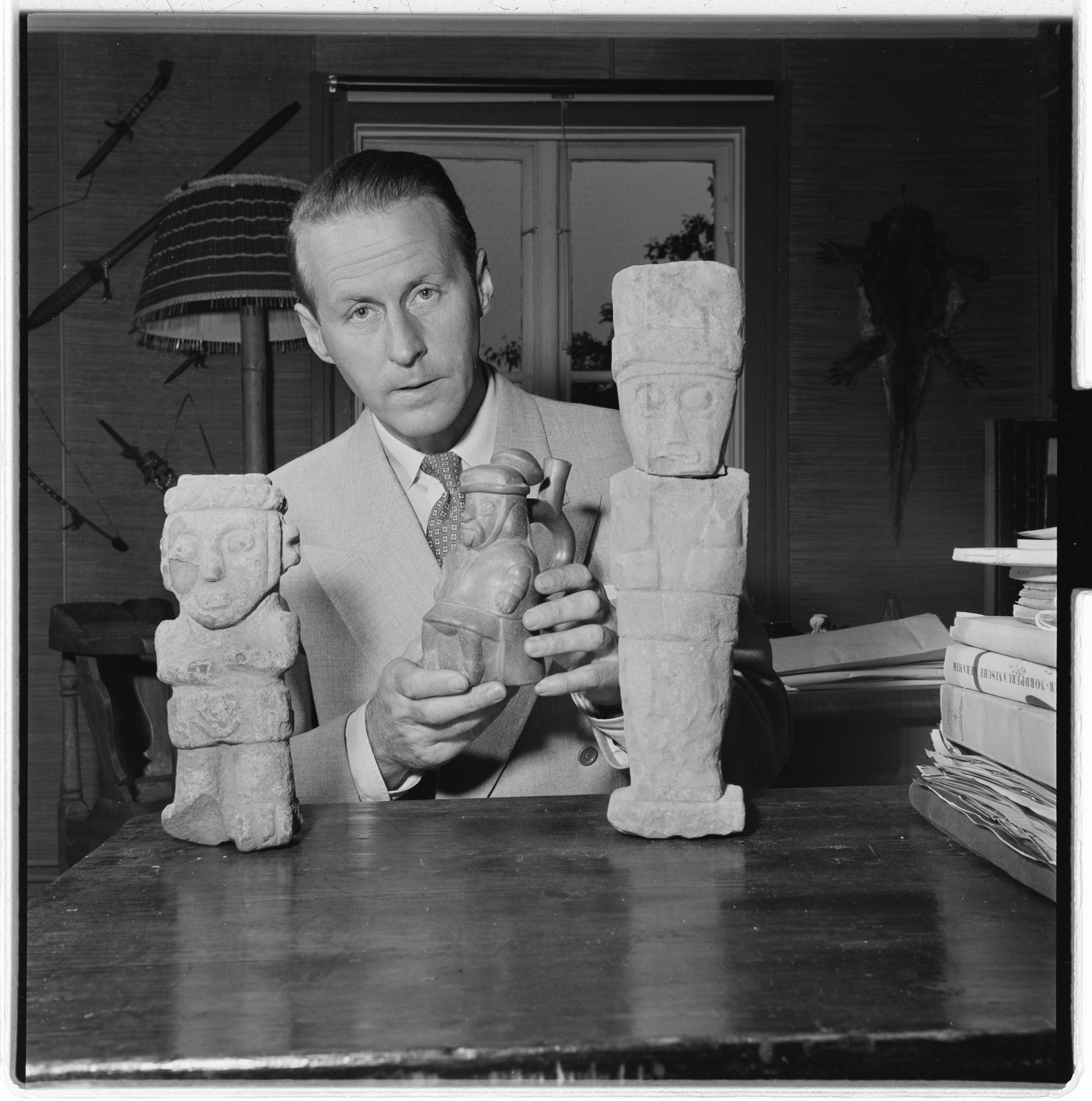
Thor Heyerdahl, the expedition leader, in 1955

Kon-Tiki had a six-man crew, five of whom were Norwegian; Bengt Danielsson was Swedish. A seventh member of the team handled administration from land but did not travel on the raft.

- Thor Heyerdahl (1914–2002) was the expedition leader. He was also the author of the book of the expedition and the narrator of the story. Heyerdahl had studied the ancient people of South America and Polynesia and believed that there was a link between the two.
- Erik Hesselberg (1914–1972) was the navigator and artist. He painted the large Kon-Tiki figure on the raft's sail. His children's book Kon-Tiki and I appeared in Norwegian in 1949 and has since been published in more than 15 languages.
- Bengt Danielsson (1921–1997) took on the role of steward, in charge of supplies and daily rations. Danielsson was a Swedish sociologist interested in human migration. He served as translator, as he was the only member of the crew who spoke Spanish. He was a voracious reader; his box aboard the raft contained many books.
- Knut Haugland (1917–2009) was a radio expert, decorated by the British in World War II for actions in the Norwegian heavy water sabotage that stalled what were believed to be Germany's plans to develop an atomic bomb. Haugland was the last surviving crew member; he died on Christmas Day, 2009 at the age of 92.
- Torstein Raaby (1918–1964) was also in charge of radio transmissions. He gained radio experience while hiding behind German lines during WWII, spying on the German battleship Tirpitz. His secret radio transmissions eventually helped guide in Allied bombers to sink the ship.
- Herman Watzinger (1910–1986) was an engineer whose area of expertise was in technical measurements. He was the first to join Heyerdahl for the trip. He collected and recorded data (such as weather data) on the voyage.
- Gerd Vold Hurum was the project manager who helped Thor Heyerdahl to organize the Kon-Tiki Expedition.

The expedition also carried a parrot named Lorita who drowned in the middle of the expedition.

== Construction ==
Preparations for the Kon Tiki expedition (c. 1947), Peruvian newsreel showing the raft at the Port of Callao (in Spanish)

The main body of the float was composed of nine balsa tree trunks up to 14 m (45 ft) long, 60 cm (2 ft) in diameter, lashed together with 30 mm (1 1/4 in) hemp ropes. Cross-pieces of balsa logs 5.5 m (18 ft) long and 30 cm (1 ft) in diameter were lashed across the logs at 91 cm (3 ft) intervals to give lateral support. Pine splashboards clad the bow, and lengths of pine 25 mm (1 in) thick and 60 cm (2 ft) wide were wedged between the balsa logs and used as centreboards.

The mainmast was made of lengths of mangrove wood lashed together to form an A-frame 8.8 m (29 ft) high. Behind the mainmast was a cabin of plaited bamboo 4.3 m (14 ft) long and 2.4 m (8 ft) wide, about 1.2–1.5 m (4–5 ft) high and roofed with banana leaf thatch. At the stern was a 5.8 m (19 ft) long steering oar of mangrove wood, with a blade of fir. The mainsail was 4.6 by 5.5 m (15 by 18 ft) on a yard of bamboo stems lashed together. Photographs also show a topsail above the mainsail, and also a mizzen sail, mounted at the stern.

The raft was partially decked in split bamboo. The main spars were a laminate of wood and reeds and Heyerdahl tested more than twenty different composites before settling on one that proved an effective compromise between bulk and torsional rigidity. No metal was used in the construction.

== Supplies ==
Kon-Tiki carried 1,040 litres (275 US gal) of drinking water in 56 water cans, as well as a number of sealed bamboo rods. The purpose stated by Heyerdahl for carrying modern and ancient containers was to test the effectiveness of ancient water storage. For food Kon-Tiki carried 200 coconuts, sweet potatoes, bottle gourds and other assorted fruit and roots. The U.S. Army Quartermaster Corps provided field rations, tinned food and survival equipment. In return, the Kon-Tiki explorers reported on the quality and utility of the provisions. They also caught plentiful numbers of fish, particularly flying fish, "dolphin fish", yellowfin tuna, bonito and shark.

Heyerdahl and crew were equipped with water-tight sports wristwatches manufactured by Swiss watchmaking firm Eterna. After the journey, Eterna decided to brand their sports watches as "Kon-Tiki".

== Communications ==
National NC-173 radio receiver used by the expedition

The expedition carried an amateur radio station with the call sign of LI2B operated by former World War II Norwegian resistance radio operators Knut Haugland and Torstein Raaby. Haugland and Raaby maintained regular communication with a number of American, Canadian, and South American stations that relayed Kon Tiki's status to the Norwegian Embassy in Washington, D.C. On August 5, Haugland made contact with a station in Oslo, Norway, 16,000 kilometres (10,000 mi) away.

Kon Tiki's transmitters were powered by batteries and a hand-cranked generator and operated on the 40, 20, 10, and 6-meter bands. Each unit was water resistant, used 2E30 vacuum tubes, and provided approximately 6 watts of RF output; the equivalent of a small flashlight. Two British 3-16 MHz Mark II transmitters were also carried on board, as was a VHF transmitter for communicating with aircraft and a hand-cranked survival radio of the Gibson Girl type for 500 and 8280 kHz.

The radio receiver used throughout the voyage, a National Radio Company NC-173, once required a thorough drying out after being soaked when landing in Rarotonga. The crew once used a hand-cranked emergency transmitter to send out an "all well, all well" message "just in time to head off a massive rescue attempt".

The call sign LI2B was used by Heyerdahl again in 1969–70, when he built a papyrus reed raft and sailed from Morocco to Barbados in an attempt to show a possible link between the civilization of ancient Egypt and the New World.

== The Voyage ==
Kon-Tiki voyage

Kon-Tiki left Callao, Peru, on the afternoon of April 28, 1947. To avoid coastal traffic it was initially towed 80 km (50 mi) out by the Peruvian Navy fleet tug Guardian Rios, then sailed roughly west carried along on the Humboldt Current.

On July 2, Heyerdahl writes about an encounter with a rogue wave; in his book he describes a "Three Sister" phenomenon: "During a night-shift with quiet seas appears an 'abnormal huge wave' followed by two more waves. The raft is being swept up and down and is covered in water." After the three waves he describes the sea as quiet as before.

The crew's first sight of land was the atoll of Puka-Puka on July 30. On August 4, the 97th day after departure, Kon-Tiki reached the Angatau atoll. The crew made brief contact with the inhabitants of Angatau Island, but were unable to land safely. Calculations made by Heyerdahl before the trip had indicated that 97 days was the minimum amount of time required to reach the Tuamotus, so the encounter with Angatau showed that they had made good time.

On August 7, the voyage ended when the raft struck a reef and was then beached on an uninhabited islet off Raroia atoll in the Tuamotus. The team had travelled a distance of around 6,980 km (4,340 mi; 3,770 nmi) in 101 days, at an average speed of 1.5 knots (2.8 km/h; 1.7 mph).

After spending a number of days alone on the islet, the crew were greeted by men from a village on a nearby island who arrived in canoes, having seen washed-up flotsam from the raft. The crew were taken back to the native village, where they were feted with traditional dances and other festivities. Finally the crew were taken off Raroia to Tahiti by the French schooner Tamara, with the salvaged Kon-Tiki in tow.

== Anthropology ==
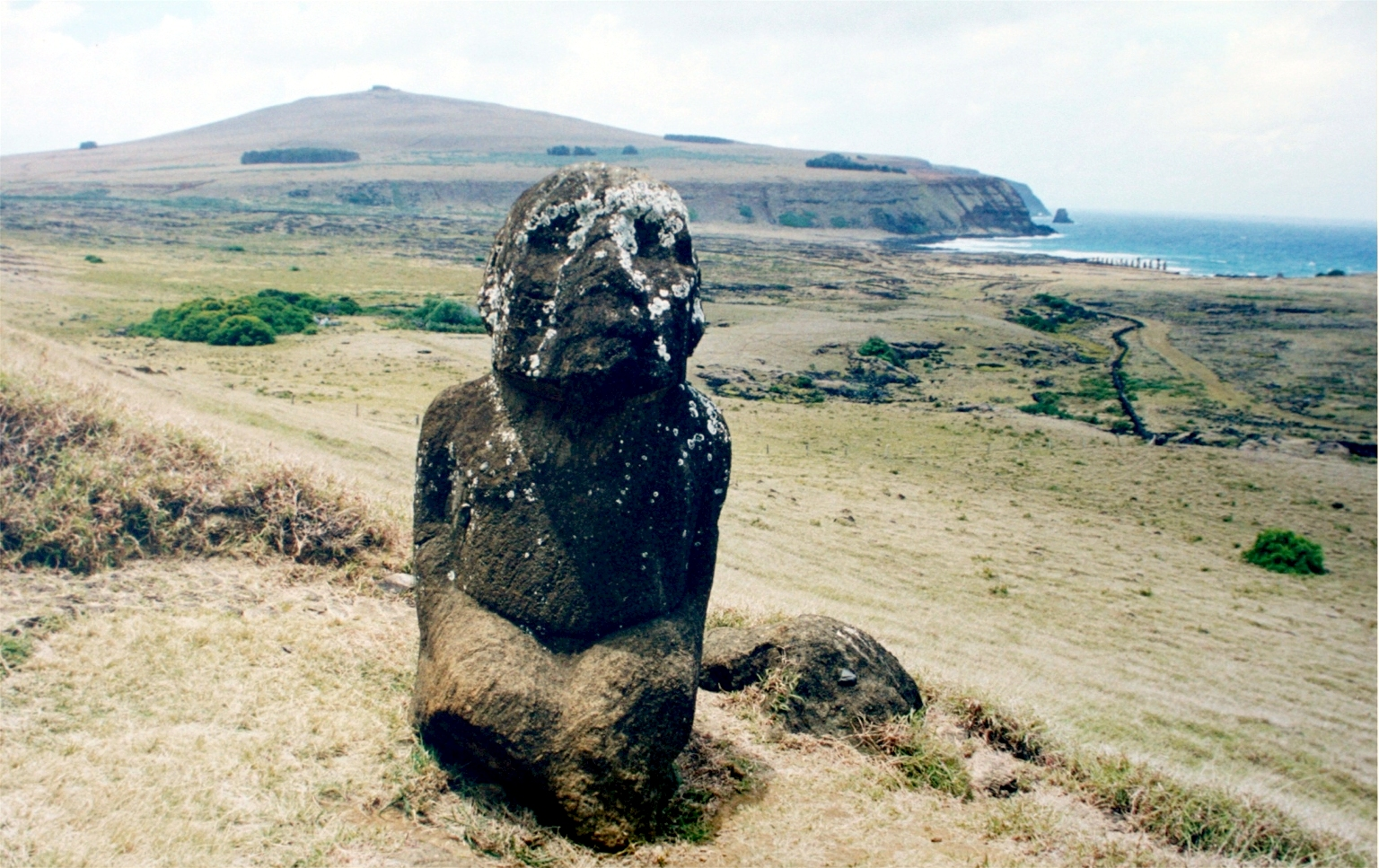
A moai

The basis of the Kon-Tiki expedition was pseudoscientific, racially controversial, and has not gained acceptance among scientists (even prior to the voyage). Heyerdahl believed that the original inhabitants of Easter Island (and the rest of Polynesia) were the "Tiki people", a race of "white bearded men" who supposedly originally sailed from Peru. He described these "Tiki people" as being a sun-worshipping fair-skinned people with blue eyes, fair or red hair, tall statures, and beards. He further said that these people were originally from the Middle East, and had crossed the Atlantic earlier to found the great Mesoamerican civilizations. By 500 CE, a branch of these people were supposedly forced out into Tiahuanaco where they became the ruling class of the Inca Empire and set out to voyage into the Pacific Ocean under the leadership of "Con Ticci Viracocha".

Main migration routes of the Austronesian Expansion (c. 3000 to 1500 BCE) based on archaeological, linguistic, and genetic studies, as opposed to Heyerdahl's eastern origin hypothesis

He argued that the monumental statues known as moai resembled sculptures more typical of pre-Columbian Peru than any Polynesian designs. He believed that the Easter Island myth of a power struggle between two peoples called the Hanau epe and Hanau momoko was a memory of conflicts between the original inhabitants of the island and a later wave of Native Americans from the Northwest coast, eventually leading to the annihilation of the Hanau epe and the destruction of the island's culture and once-prosperous economy. Heyerdahl described these later migrants as "Maori-Polynesians" who were supposedly Asians who crossed over the Bering land bridge into Northwest America before sailing westward towards Polynesia (the westward direction is because he refused to accept that Polynesians were capable of sailing against winds and currents). He associated them with the Tlingit and Haida peoples and characterized them as "inferior" to the Tiki people.

Heyerdahl's hypothesis was part of early Eurocentric hyperdiffusionism and the westerner disbelief that (non-white) "stone-age" peoples with "no math" could colonize islands separated by vast distances of ocean water, even against prevailing winds and currents. He rejected the highly skilled voyaging and navigating traditions of the Austronesian peoples and instead argued that Polynesia was settled from boats following the wind and currents for navigation from South America. As such, the Kon-Tiki was deliberately a primitive raft and unsteerable, in contrast to the sophisticated outrigger canoes and catamarans of the Austronesian people.

Heyerdahl's hypothesis of Polynesian origins is overwhelmingly rejected by scientists today. Archaeological, linguistic, cultural, and genetic evidence all support a western origin (from Island Southeast Asia) for Polynesians via the Austronesian expansion. "Drift voyaging" from South America was also deemed "extremely unlikely" in 1973 by computer modeling. The 1976 voyage of the Hōkūleʻa, a performance-accurate replica of a Polynesian double-hulled wa'a kaulua voyaging canoe, from Hawaiʻi to Tahiti was partly a demonstration to prove that Heyerdahl was wrong. The Hōkūleʻa sailed against prevailing winds and exclusively used wayfinding and celestial Polynesian navigation techniques (unlike the modern equipment and charts of the Kon-Tiki). Hōkūleʻa also remains fully operational, and has since completed ten other voyages, including a three-year circumnavigation of the planet from 2014 to 2017, with other sister ships.

Historians today consider that the Polynesians from the west were the original inhabitants and that the story of the Hanau epe is either pure myth, or a memory of internal tribal or class conflicts.

== Later recreations of Kon-Tiki ==
=== Seven Little Sisters ===
In 1954, William Willis sailed alone on a raft Seven Little Sisters from Peru to American Samoa, successfully completing the journey. He sailed 10,800 km (6,700 mi), which was 3,500 km (2,200 mi) farther than Kon-Tiki. In a second great voyage ten years later, he rafted 12,001 km (7,457 mi) from South America to Australia with a metal raft Age Unlimited.

=== Kantuta ===
In 1955, the Czech explorer and adventurer Eduard Ingris attempted to recreate the Kon-Tiki expedition on a balsa raft called Kantuta. His first expedition, Kantuta I, took place in 1955–1956 and led to failure. In 1959, Ingris built a new balsa raft, Kantuta II, and tried to repeat the previous expedition. The second expedition was a success. Ingris was able to cross the Pacific Ocean on the balsa raft from Peru to Polynesia.

=== Tahiti-Nui ===
A French seafarer, Éric de Bisschop, committed himself in a project he had considered for some years: he built a Polynesian raft in order to cross the eastern Pacific Ocean from Tahiti to Chile (contrary to Thor Heyerdahl's crossing); the Tahiti-Nui left Papeete with a crew of five on November 8, 1956. When near the Juan Fernández Islands (Chile) in May 1957, the raft was in a very poor state and they asked for a towing, but it was damaged during the operation and had to be abandoned, but they were able to preserve all the equipment that had been aboard.

=== Tahiti-Nui II ===
A second Tahiti-Nui was built in Constitución, Chile, leaving on April 13, 1958, towards Callao, then towards the Marquesas. It missed its target and after four months, the raft began to sink. The crew built a new smaller raft, the Tahiti Nui III, in the ocean out of the more buoyant parts of the Tahiti Nui II. They were swept towards Cook Islands where on August 30, the raft went aground and was wrecked at Rakahanga atoll. Éric de Bisschop died in this accident.

=== Tangaroa (1965) ===
A Peruvian expedition led by Carlos Caravedo crossed the Pacific Ocean in 1965 in 115 days in a raft named Tangaroa, of which 18 days were used by the crew to cross Tuamotus, the Tuamotu Archipelago, making Tangaroa the only raft that has managed to cross that dangerous archipelago of French Polynesia by its own means. On November 18, 1965, the Tangaroa ended its journey on the Fakarava island. Fakarava is where the Tangaroa is currently preserved.

=== Las Balsas ===
The 1973 Las Balsas expedition is the only known multiple-raft crossing of the Pacific Ocean. It is the longest-known raft voyage in history. The expedition was led by Spaniard Vital Alsar, who, in 1970, led the La Balsa expedition, only on that occasion with one raft and three companions. The crossing was successful and, at the time, the longest raft voyage in history, until eclipsed in 1973 by Las Balsas. The purpose of the 1973 expedition was three-fold: (1) to prove that the success of 1970 was no accident, (2) to test different currents in the sea, which Alsar maintained ancient mariners knew as modern humans know road maps, and (3) to show that the original expeditions, directed perhaps toward trade or colonisation, may have consisted of small fleets of balsa rafts.

=== Tangaroa (2006) ===
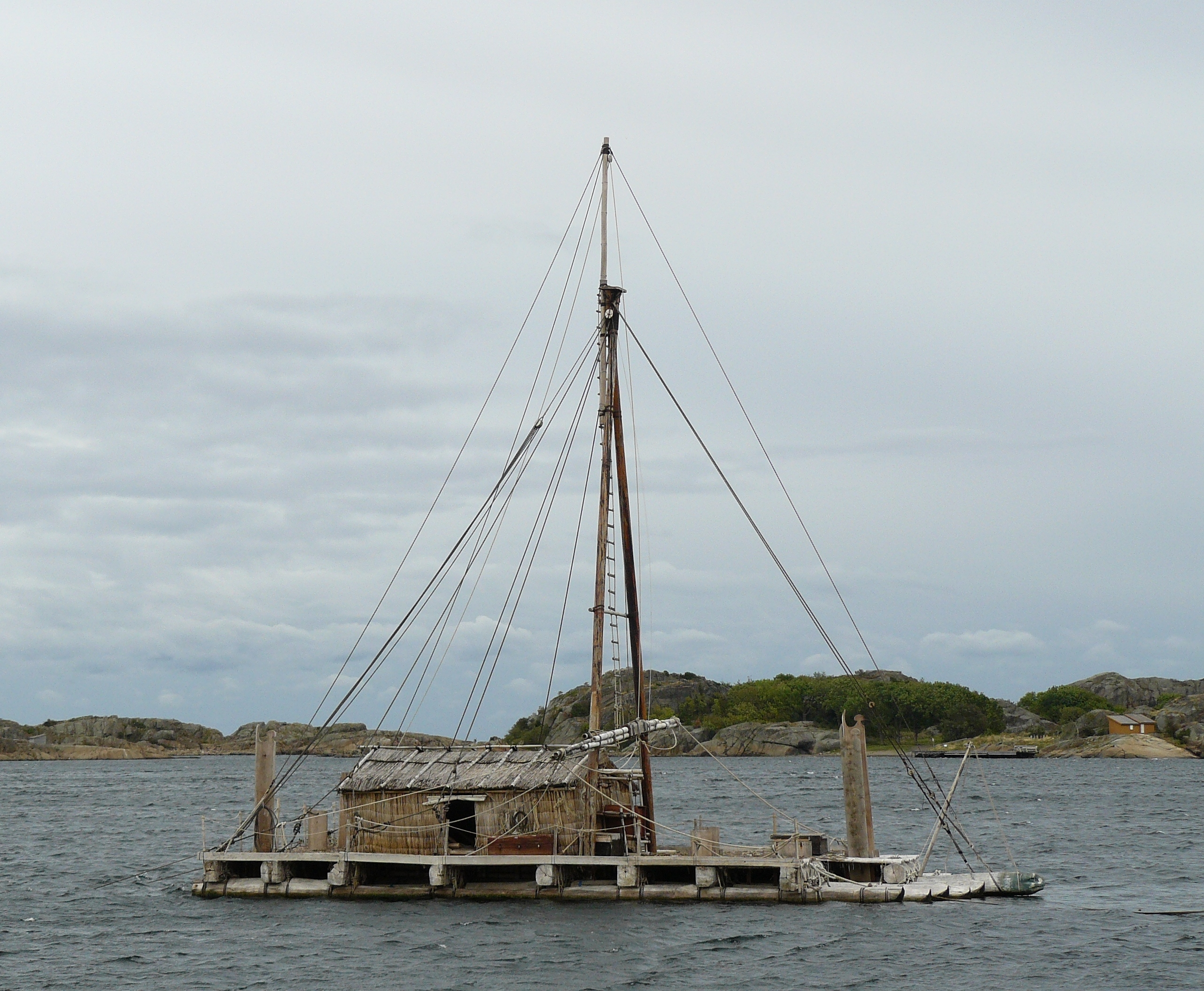
Tangaroa anchored by Stavern, Norway

In 2006, the Tangaroa Expedition recreated the Kon-Tiki voyage using a newly built raft, the Tangaroa, named after the Māori sea-god Tangaroa. Tangaroa's six-man crew was led by Norwegian Torgeir Higraff and included Olav Heyerdahl, grandson of Thor Heyerdahl, Bjarne Krekvik (captain), Øyvin Lauten (executive officer), Swedish Anders Berg (photographer) and Peruvian Roberto Sala. Tangaroa was launched on the same day that Kon-Tiki had been—April 28—and it reached its destination on July 7, which was 30 days faster than Heyerdahl's Kon-Tiki which had taken 101 days for the voyage. Tangaroa's speed was credited to the proper use of guaras (centerboards).

=== An-Tiki ===
On January 30, 2011, An-Tiki, a raft modeled after Kon-Tiki, began a 4,800-kilometre (3,000 mi), 70-day journey across the Atlantic Ocean from the Canary Islands to the island of Eleuthera in the Bahamas. The expedition was piloted by four men, aged from 56 to 84 years, led by Anthony Smith. The trip was designed to commemorate the journey in an open boat of survivors from the British steamship Anglo-Saxon, sunk by the German cruiser Widder in 1940. The raft ended its voyage in the Caribbean island of St Maarten, completing its trip to Eleuthera in the following year with Smith and a new crew.

=== Kon-Tiki2 ===
On 7 November 2015, two teams with two balsa rafts Rahiti Tane and Tupac Yupanqui left Lima, Peru for Easter Island. Expedition Kon-Tiki2 got its name because it had 2 crews from many nations: Norway, Russia, UK, Mexico, New Zealand, Sweden, and Peru. It sought to double down on Heyerdahl's voyage by sailing two rafts from South America to Polynesia and then back. Expedition leader was Torgeir Higraff from Tangaroa Expedition (2006). Øyvin Lauten and Kari Skår Dahl were captains on the first leg, while Signe Meling and Ola Borgfjord were captains on the second leg. The raft reached Easter Island, but did not complete the return.

The two rafts were made of 11 balsa logs and 10 crossbeams held together by 2000 meters (1¼ miles) of natural fiber ropes. Tens of thousands of waves, up to six meters (20') tall, hit the rafts in an El Niño year. This stress for 16 weeks weakened the ropes, but the crew could not replace all of them. On March 3, 2016, all crew members were taken on board the Hokuetsu Ushaka freight ship after 115 days of sailing and 4½ months at sea.

== Documentation ==
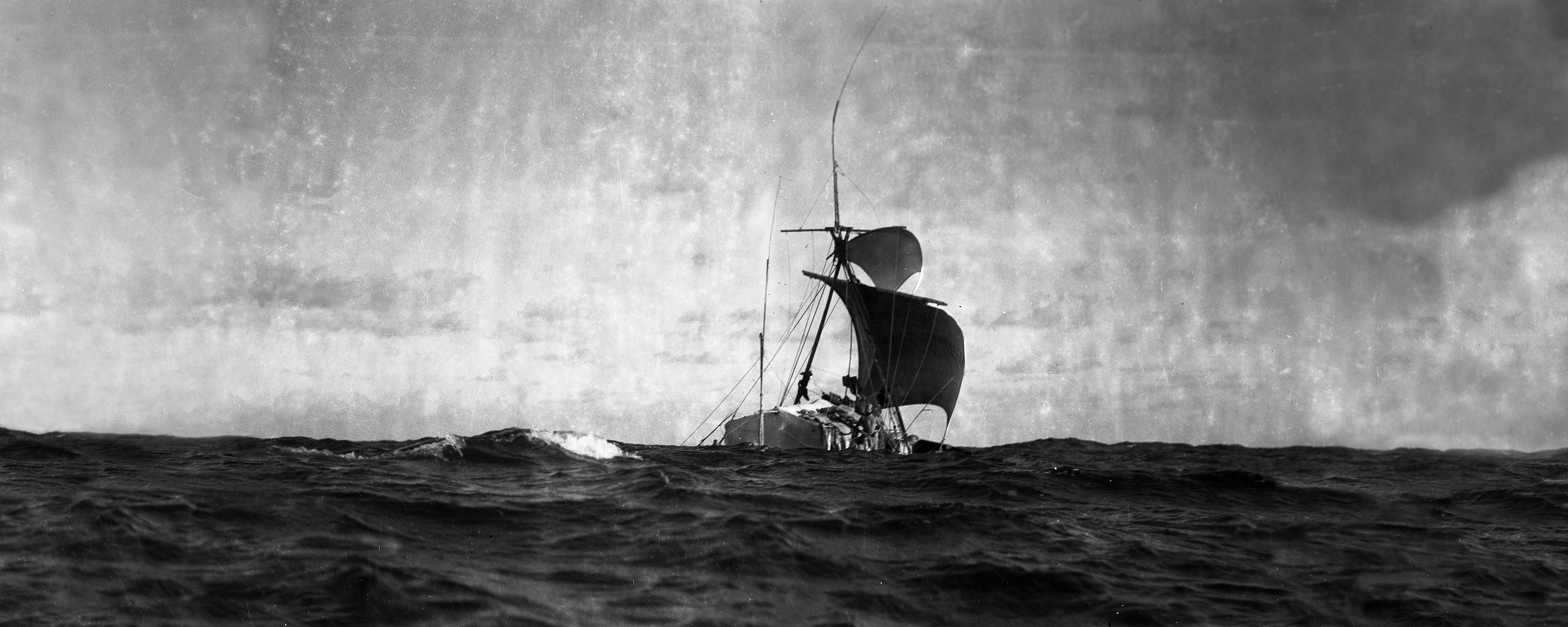
Still picture from the documentary film Kon-Tiki (1950)

=== Memoir book ===
A book documenting the voyage and raft was released in 1948 by Thor Heyerdahl, called The Kon-Tiki Expedition: By Raft Across the South Seas.

=== Documentary film ===
A black and white film documentary about the voyage and raft was released in 1950, called Kon-Tiki (produced in 1947). It won the 1951 Oscar for Best Documentary Feature. There was also produced short Kodak Kodachrome color film from expedition in 1947.

== In popular culture ==
Kon-Tiki is a 2012 Norwegian historical dramatized feature film about the 1947 Kon-Tiki expedition. It starred Pål Sverre Valheim Hagen as Thor Heyerdahl and was directed by Joachim Rønning and Espen Sandberg. It was the highest-grossing film of 2012 in Norway and the country's most expensive production to date.

Episode 5 of the tenth season of HBO's Curb Your Enthusiasm features Clive Owen as himself in a one-man play entitled "Kon Tiki".

Episode 2 of the second season of Apple TV+'s For All Mankind mentions a Space Shuttle named Kon-Tiki.

Cotton Mather's 1997 album Kontiki is named for the Kon-Tiki expedition.

The Kon-Tiki and Ra expeditions were parodied in the titular sketch of "Mr. and Mrs. Brian Norris' Ford Popular", the second episode of Series 3 of Monty Python's Flying Circus. Mr. Norris and his wife seek to use the titular car to prove that Hounslow's inhabitants in fact migrated from their original home region, Surbiton, by driving the short distance from the former to the latter. Upon being unable to surmise how the Surbiton migrants might have crossed the River Thames, in spite of the presence of a visible bridge, they go to Hounslow Central tube station and notice a sign pointing to Surbiton there; the Norrises conclude that it was in fact the people of Hounslow who made the journey to Surbiton, and not vice versa.

In 1961, British popular music group The Shadows had a hit record in the UK and elsewhere, with an instrumental titled Kon-Tiki (song).

German famous disco band Dschingis Khan has a song Kontiki dedicated to this journey.

== See also ==
- Acali – 1973 social experiment
- Experimental archaeology – Archaeological sub-discipline
- Polynesian navigation – Methods to navigate the Pacific Ocean
- Pre-Columbian transoceanic contact theories – Speculative historical theories
- Pre-Columbian rafts – Boats in pre-Spanish and Portuguese South America
- Chincha culture – Native American culture
- Hyperdiffusionism – Pseudoarchaeological hypothesis
- Tupac Inca Yupanqui – Tenth emperor of the Inca Empire (before 1471 – 1493)
- Atlantis Expedition – 1984 Argentine raft journey across Atlantic Ocean
- Hōkūleʻa – Polynesian double-hulled voyaging canoe
- Plastiki – Boat made of plastic
- Tiki – First man in Māori mythology
