= William Willis (sailor) =

American sailor and writer

- Born: September 8, 1893; Hamburg, Germany
- Died: July 1968; North Atlantic Ocean
- Citizenship: United States
- Occupations: Writer, sailor

William Willis (September 8, 1893 – July 1968) was an American sailor and writer who is famous due to his solo rafting expeditions across oceans.

== Early years ==
Willis became a sailor at 15, leaving his home in Hamburg, Germany, to sail around Cape Horn.

A few days after the New Year in 1938, Willis rented a room in New York City from a French immigrant named Madame Carnot. Her son, Bernard Carnot, had been sent to Devil's Island in 1922 for a murder that he did not commit. Out of compassion and a sense of adventure, Willis set out to the penal colony to effect Bernard Carnot's escape, which he eventually accomplished.

During his first solo expedition in 1954 from South America to American Samoa, he sailed 6,700 miles – 2,200 miles farther than did Thor Heyerdahl on Kon-Tiki. His raft was named "Seven Little Sisters" and was crewed by himself, his parrot, and cat. Willis was age 61 at the time of this voyage. He selected the seven great balsa tree trunks which were used in the raft (hence the name Seven Little Sisters) himself at a balsa forest on a great inland estate. His wife saw him off at the dockside in Callao, Peru. In an incident with the raft in the docks the day before sailing, Willis suffered a hernia, but nonetheless set sail as planned.

In a second great voyage ten years later, at the age of 71, he sailed 10,000 miles from South America to Australia single-handing a 34-foot (10.4 m) raft named Age Unlimited. He left Callao on 5 July 1963, made a lengthy stop in Apia, and after a total of 204 days at sea, arrived near Tully Heads, Queensland, completing his voyage on 9 September 1964.

== Death and legacy ==
At age 74, Willis made his third attempt at a solo crossing of the North Atlantic in a small sailboat. Willis left Montauk Point, Long Island, on May 2, 1968, in his boat Little One. On September 24, 1968, the crew of the Soviet Latvian trawler Yantarny sighted his half-submerged boat nearly four hundred miles west of the Irish coast. No one was found on board. Willis's log was found on the boat, with its last entry dated July 21, 1968.

Novelist T. R. Pearson wrote the book Seaworthy: Adrift with William Willis in the Golden Age of Rafting (2006), summarizing Willis's adventures.

Willis's adventure on Devil's Island was featured in the Season 4 premiere of Drunk History on Comedy Central.

In 2014 Russian rock group Orgia Pravednikov (lit. 'Orgy of The Righteous') released a single Vdal po siney vode (lit. 'Far on blue water') about Willis's final adventure.

== Bibliography ==
- Willis, William (1967). The Hundred Lives of an Ancient Mariner: An Autobiography. London: The Adventurers Club.
- Willis, William (1966). Whom the Sea Has Taken. New York: Meredith Press.
- Willis, William (1959). Damned and Damned Again: The True Story of the Last Escape from Devil's Island. New York: St. Martin's Press.
- Willis, William (1955). The Epic Voyage of the Seven Little Sisters: A 6700 Mile Voyage Alone Across the Pacific. London: Hutchinson. (Previous title: The Gods Were Kind)
- Willis, William (1966). An Angel on Each Shoulder. England: Hutchinson & Co. (Publishers) Ltd.
- Willis, William (1967). Whom the Sea Has Taken (First US ed.). New York: Meredith Press. (Previous title: An Angel on Each Shoulder)

== See also ==
- Adventurers' Club of New York
- Pre-Columbian rafts
