= Guara (centerboard) =

A guara is a hardwood centerboard used in Andean rafts. The Tangaroa Expedition outperformed Kon-Tiki in part due to using guaras.
