= John F. Haslett =

John F. Haslett is a writer based in Los Angeles, California. He writes about his experiences with building and sailing replicas of pre-Columbian Ecuadorean sailing vessels. His expeditions with these vessels have been covered by CNN, American Adventure Productions, National Geographic Adventure, and in his recently released book, Voyage of the Manteño, from St. Martins' Press.

Haslett's expeditions began in 1995 and have included the building and sailing of four experimental replicas of the large sailing rafts of pre-Columbian Ecuador. The early conquistadores, including Francisco Pizarro and Bartholome Ruiz, documented that the Manteño chiefdom of Western Ecuador were capable mariners.

John is married to Hollywood executive Annie Biggs.

== See also ==
- Pre-Columbian rafts
