= Zlonice =

- Market town
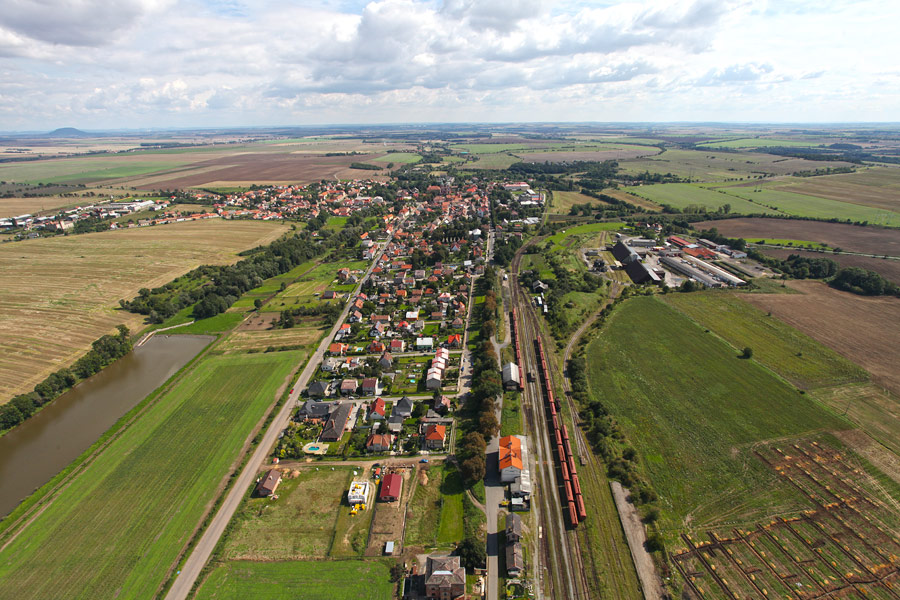
- Aerial view of Zlonice

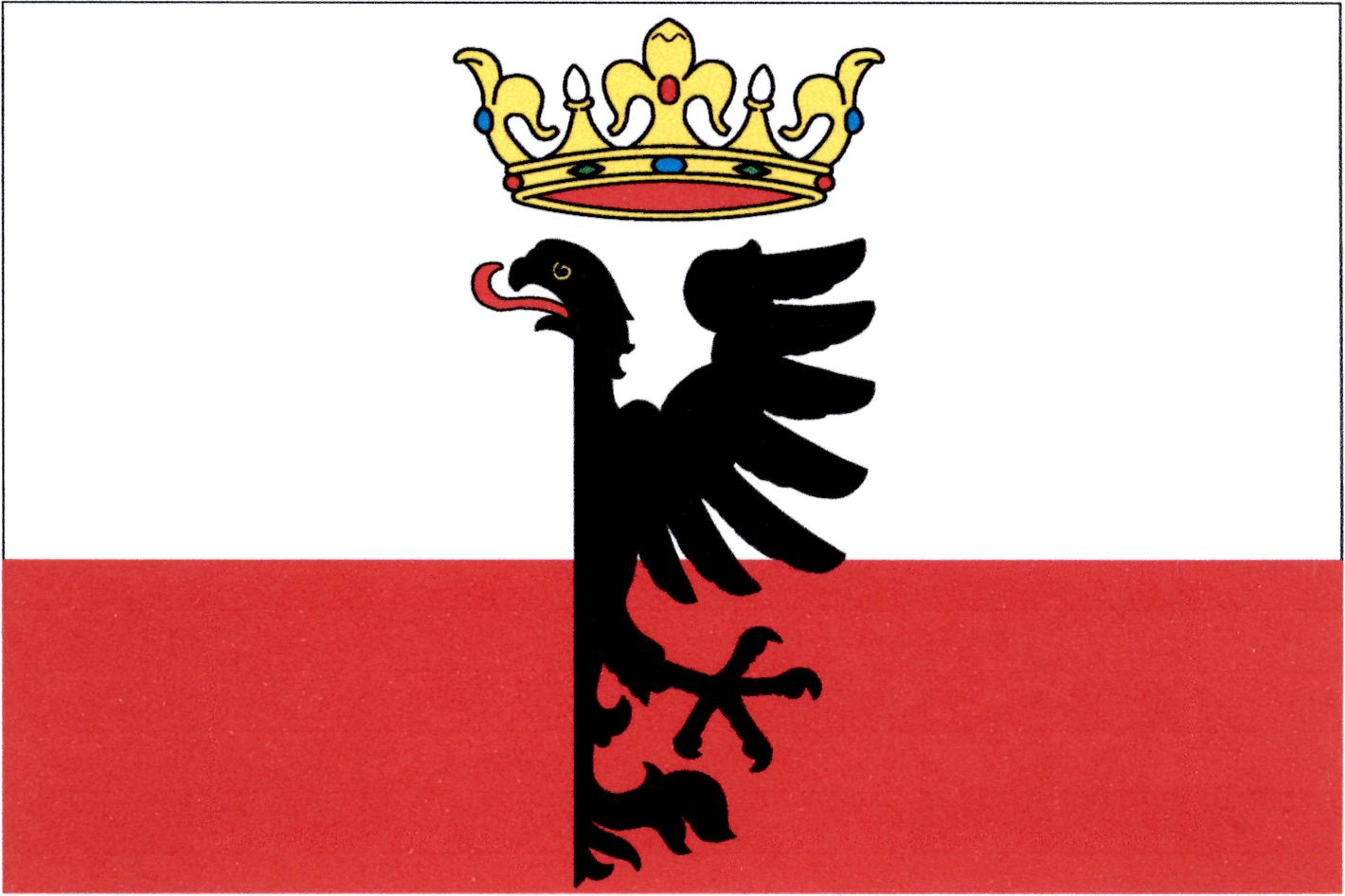
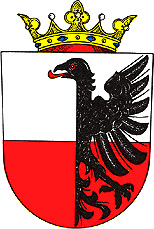
- Flag Coat of arms

- Location in the Czech Republic
- Coordinates: 50°17′15″N 14°5′32″E
- Country: Czech Republic
- Region: Central Bohemian
- District: Kladno
- First mentioned: 1318

Area
  - Total: 16.07 km^{2} (6.20 sq mi)
- Elevation: 223 m (732 ft)

Population (2026-01-01)
  - Total: 2,275
  - Density: 141.6/km^{2} (366.7/sq mi)
- Time zone: UTC+1 (CET)
  - Summer (DST): UTC+2 (CEST)
- Postal code: 273 71
- Website: www.zlonice.cz

Zlonice (Czech pronunciation: [ˈzloɲɪtsɛ]) is a market town in Kladno District in the Central Bohemian Region of the Czech Republic. It has about 2,300 inhabitants.

== Administrative division ==
Zlonice consists of five municipal parts (in brackets population according to the 2021 census):

- Zlonice (1,677)
- Břešťany (175)
- Lisovice (67)
- Tmáň (137)
- Vyšínek (125)

== Etymology ==
The name is derived from the personal name Zloňa, meaning "the village of Zloňa's people". The personal name itself was derived from the Czech word zlý, i.e. 'evil'.

== Geography ==
Zlonice is located about 16 kilometres (10 mi) north of Kladno and 29 km (18 mi) northwest of Prague. It lies in a flat agricultural landscape in the Lower Ohře Table.

== History ==
The first written mention of Zlonice is from 1318. It was a settlement on a trade route. The first written mention of the fortress in Zlonice is from 1576. In the 17th century, the fortress was rebuilt into a Renaissance castle.

The village of Vyšínek is first mentioned in 1263, Břešťany in 1282, Tmáň in 1382, and Lisovice at the beginning of the 14th century.

== Demographics ==
Historical population

Year	Pop.	±%
1869	2,010	—
1880	2,376	+18.2%
1890	2,614	+10.0%
1900	3,051	+16.7%
1910	3,157	+3.5%

Year	Pop.	±%
1921	3,240	+2.6%
1930	3,263	+0.7%
1950	2,541	−22.1%
1961	2,605	+2.5%
1970	2,370	−9.0%

Year	Pop.	±%
1980	2,243	−5.4%
1991	1,964	−12.4%
2001	2,193	+11.7%
2011	2,149	−2.0%
2021	2,181	+1.5%

Source: Censuses

== Transport ==
Zlonice is located on the railway line Louny–Kralupy nad Vltavou.

== Sights ==
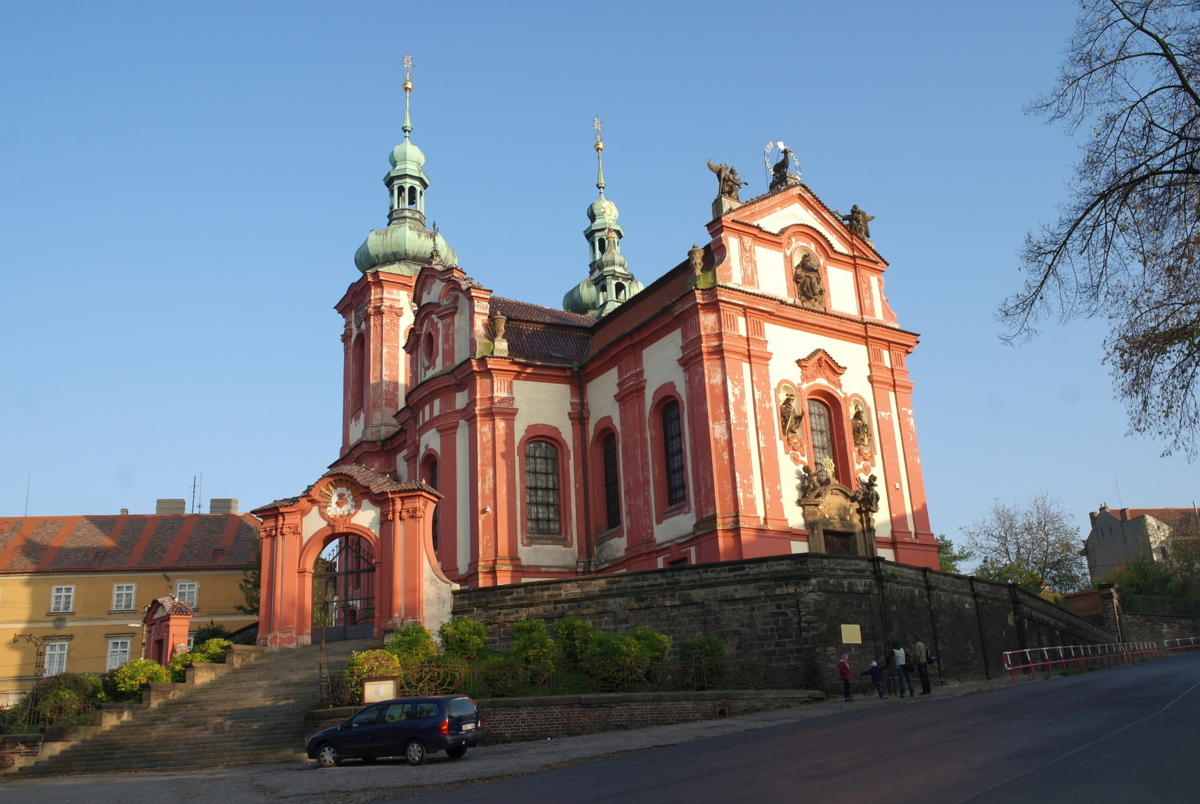
Church of the Assumption of the Virgin Mary; the castle in the left

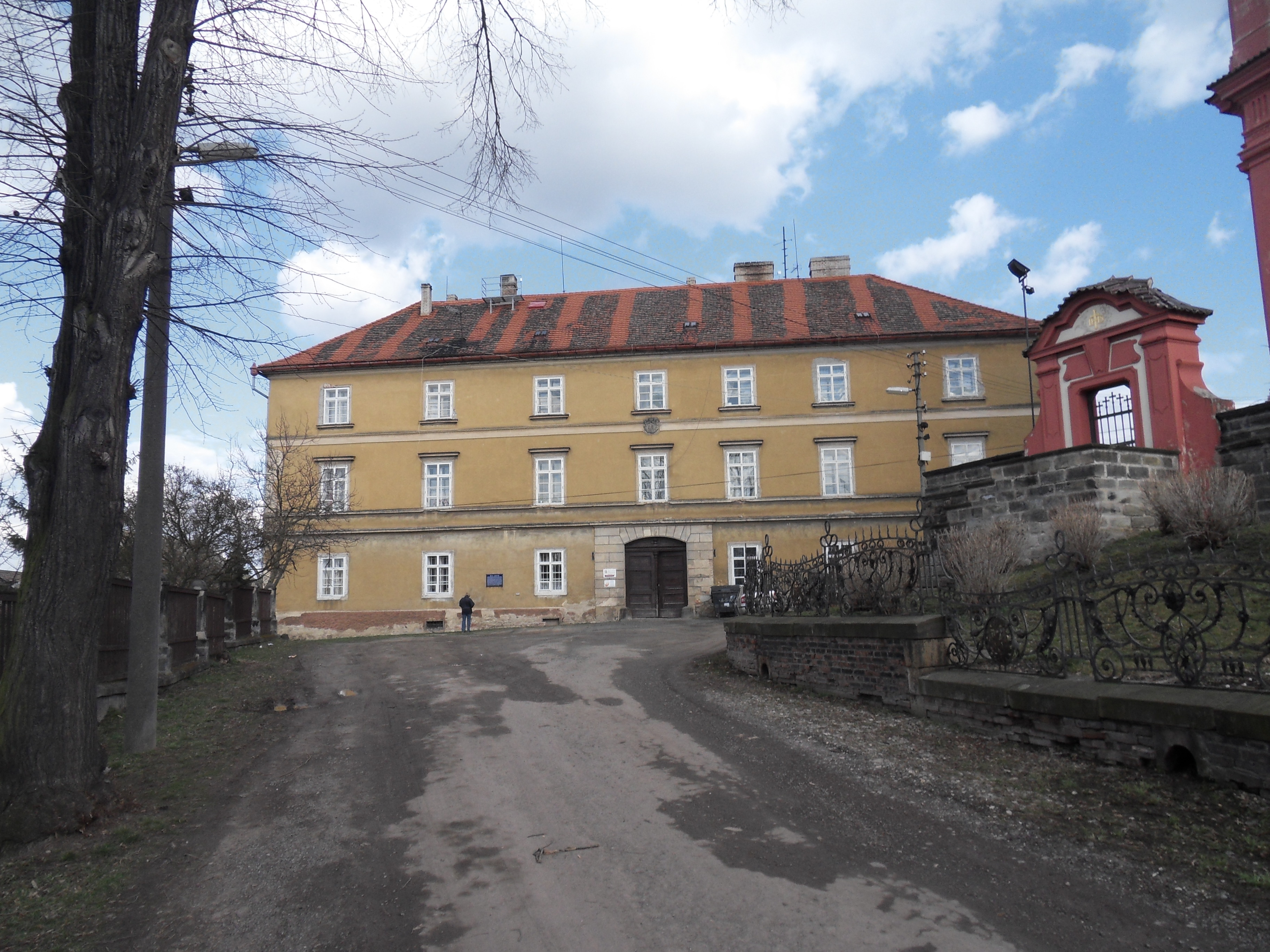
Zlonice Castle

The Church of the Assumption of the Virgin Mary is the landmark of the town square. There was originally a Gothic church, but it was replaced by the current Baroque church, which was built in 1727–1744 according to the design by František Maxmilián Kaňka.

Zlonice Castle is originally a Renaissance castle, which was completely rebuilt in the mid-19th century. It has a Neoclassical façade. Today it houses apartments and offices.

The former Baroque hospital building houses the Memorial of Antonín Dvořák, who lived in Zlonice in 1853–1856. It is a museum that focuses on the life of Dvořák, on the market town's musical tradition and on regional history.

In Lisovice is a small railway museum.

== Notable people ==
- Wenzel Krumpholz (1750–1817), mandolin and violin player
- Antonín Dvořák (1841–1904), composer; lived here in 1853–1856 and nicknamed his Symphony No. 1 The Bells of Zlonice
- Eduard Ingriš (1905–1991), Czech-American composer and photographer
